= 45th Academy Awards =

- Date: March 27, 1973
- Site: Dorothy Chandler Pavilion; Los Angeles, California
- Hosted by: Carol Burnett, Michael Caine, Charlton Heston and Rock Hudson
- Produced by: Howard W. Koch
- Directed by: Marty Pasetta

Highlights
- Best Picture: The Godfather
- Most awards: Cabaret (8)
- Most nominations: Cabaret and The Godfather (10)

TV in the United States
- Network: NBC
- Duration: 2 hours, 38 minutes

The 45th Academy Awards were presented Tuesday, March 27, 1973, at the Dorothy Chandler Pavilion in Los Angeles, California, honoring the best films of 1972. The ceremonies were presided over by Carol Burnett, Michael Caine, Charlton Heston, and Rock Hudson.

The ceremony was marked by Marlon Brando's boycott of the Oscars, and his sending of Sacheen Littlefeather to explain why he could not show up to collect his Best Actor award for The Godfather; and by Charlie Chaplin's only competitive Oscar win, for Best Original Dramatic Score for his 20-year-old film Limelight, which was eligible because it did not screen in Los Angeles until 1972. Prior to this ceremony, Chaplin had received 2 Academy Honorary Awards: in 1972 for his lifetime of work; and in 1929 (after having revoked his nominations for Best Director, Actor, and Writing (Original), thereby presenting him with a special award celebrating his multifaceted achievements).

With eight wins for Cabaret, adapted from the Broadway stage musical by Bob Fosse, the film set a record for most Oscar prizes without winning Best Picture. Best Picture winner The Godfather received three Academy Awards.

This year was the first time that two African American women received nominations for Best Actress: Cicely Tyson and Diana Ross. Minnelli accepted her Oscar despite a slight scrape she had incurred while riding a motorcycle. Ross was criticized for running a promotional ad campaign demanding that she win the Best Actress Oscar. Meanwhile, Edward G. Robinson, who died two months before the ceremony, became the second actor to receive his honorary Oscar posthumously, after Douglas Fairbanks (d. 1939) in 1940.

This was also the first year when all Oscar winners were brought on stage at the end of the ceremony. The show drew a television audience of 85 million viewers.

== Winners and nominees ==
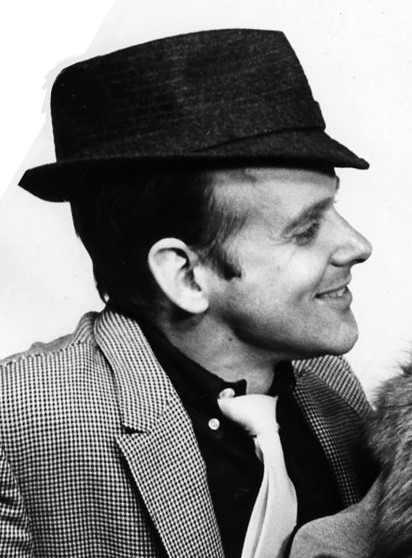
Bob Fosse, Best Director winner

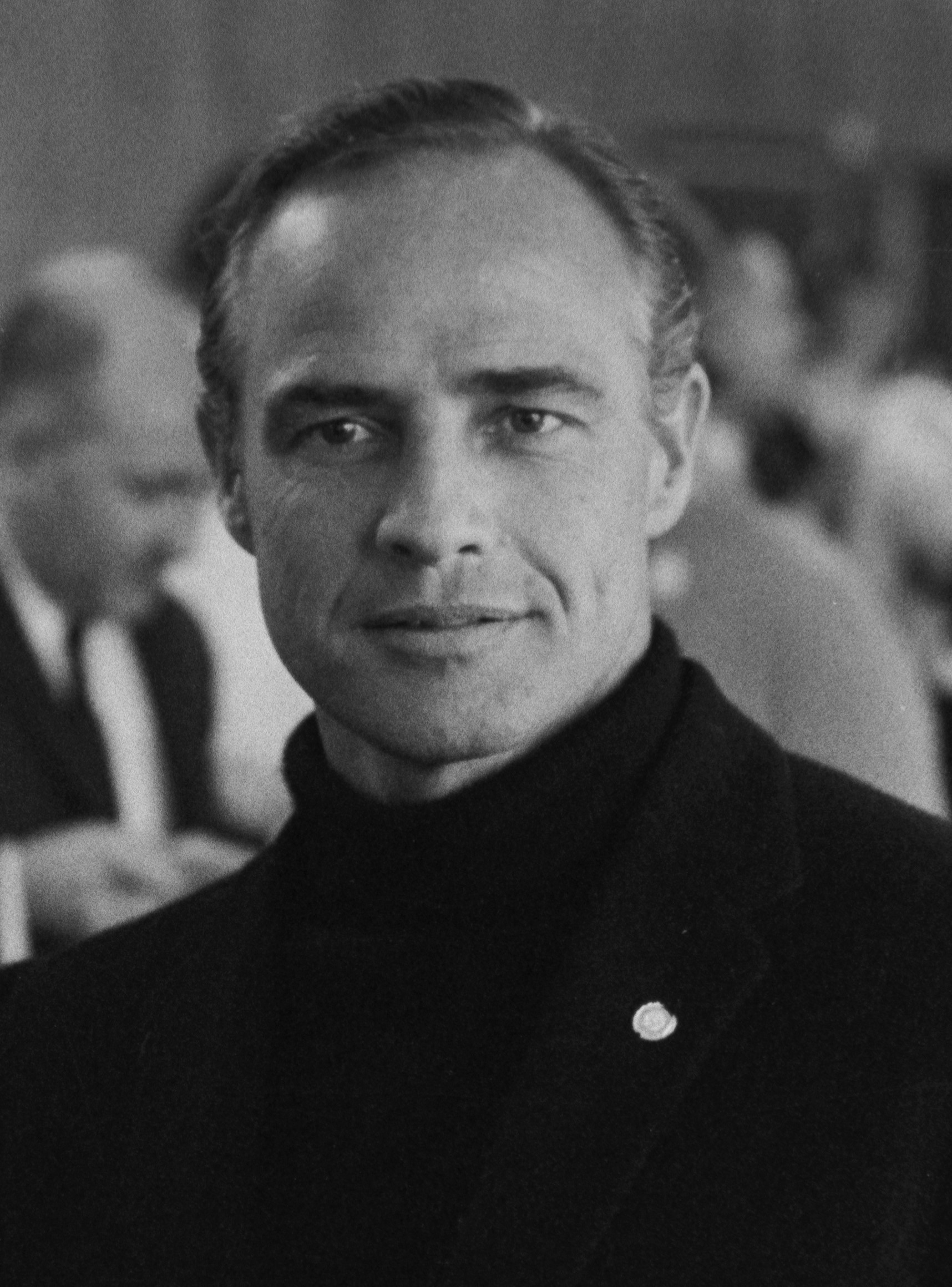
Marlon Brando, Best Actor winner

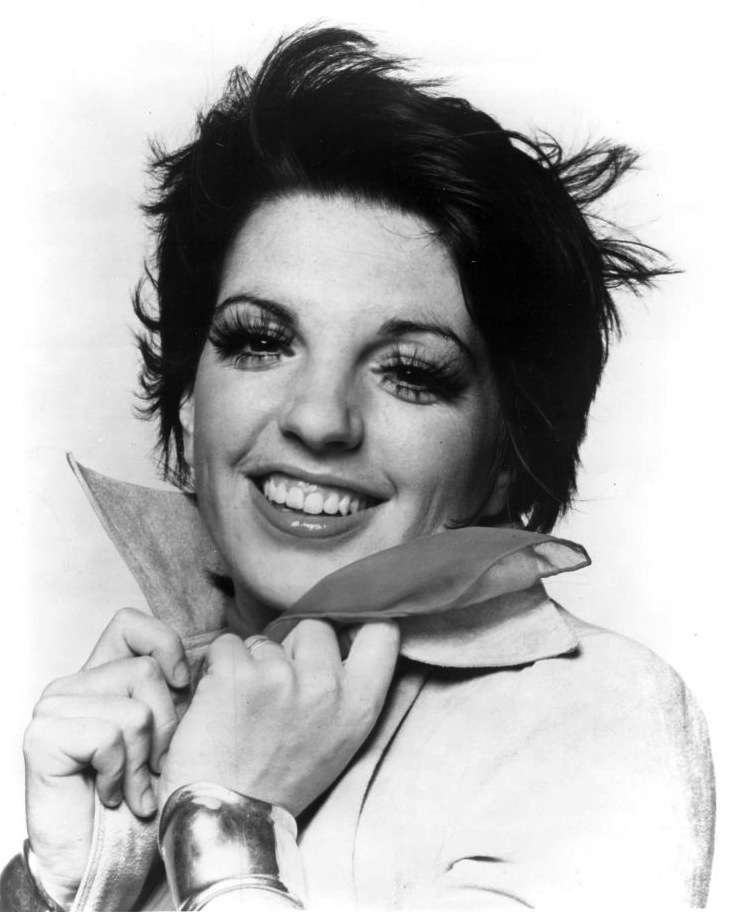
Liza Minnelli, Best Actress winner

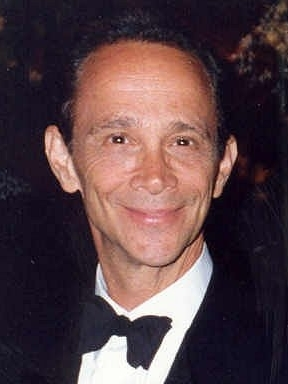
Joel Grey, Best Supporting Actor winner

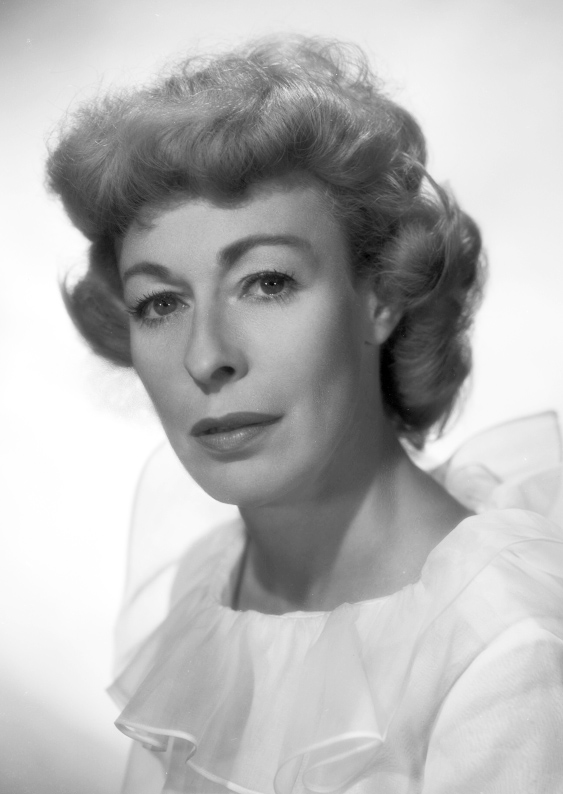
Eileen Heckart, Best Supporting Actress winner

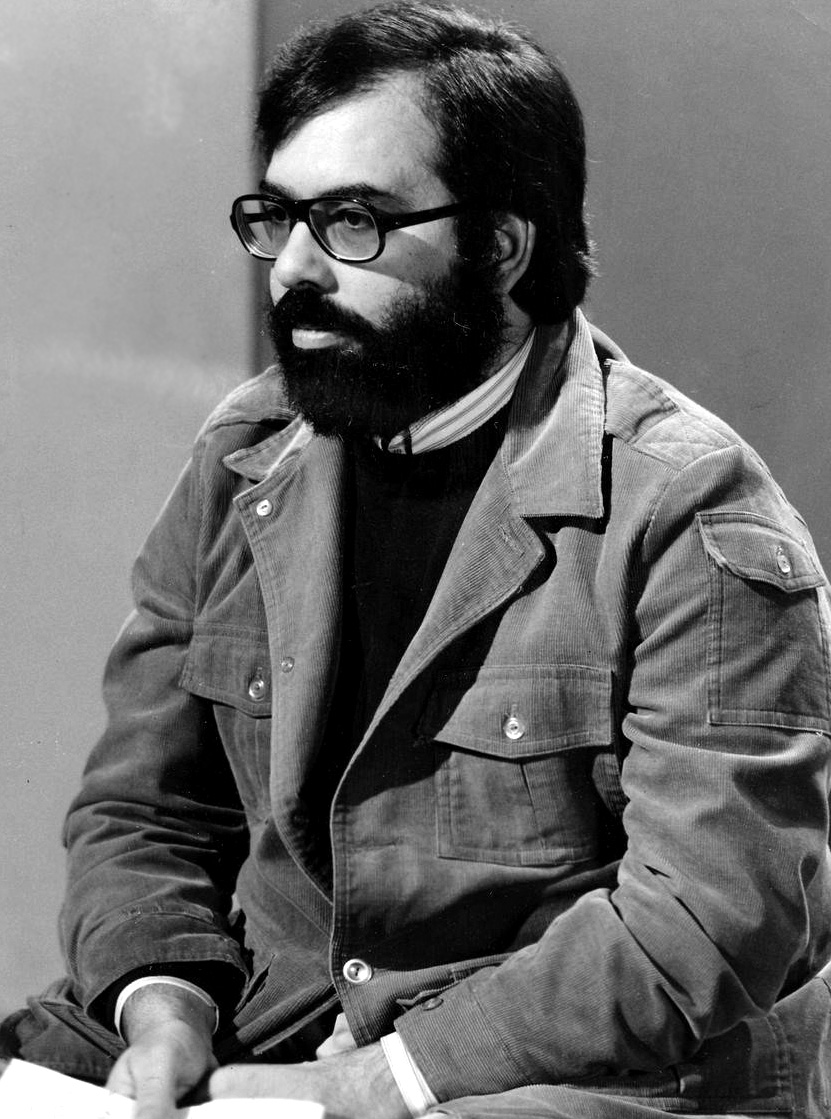
Francis Ford Coppola, Best Screenplay Based on Material from Another Medium co-winner

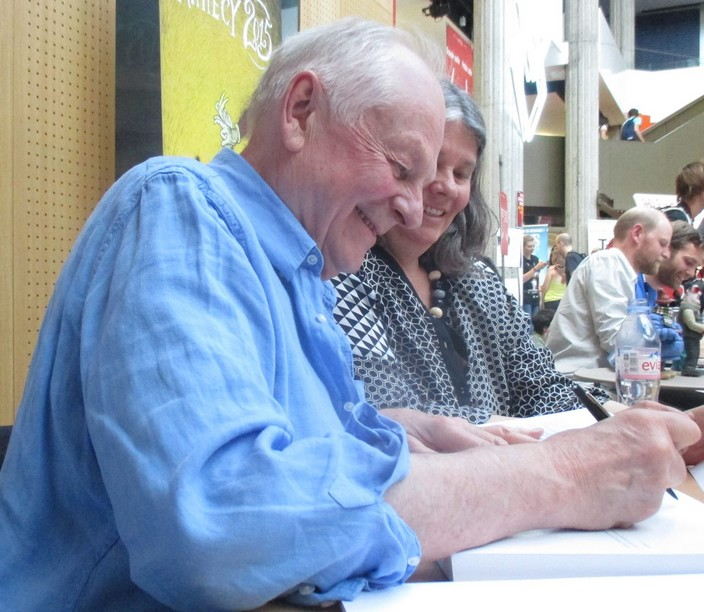
Richard Williams, Best Animated Short Film winner

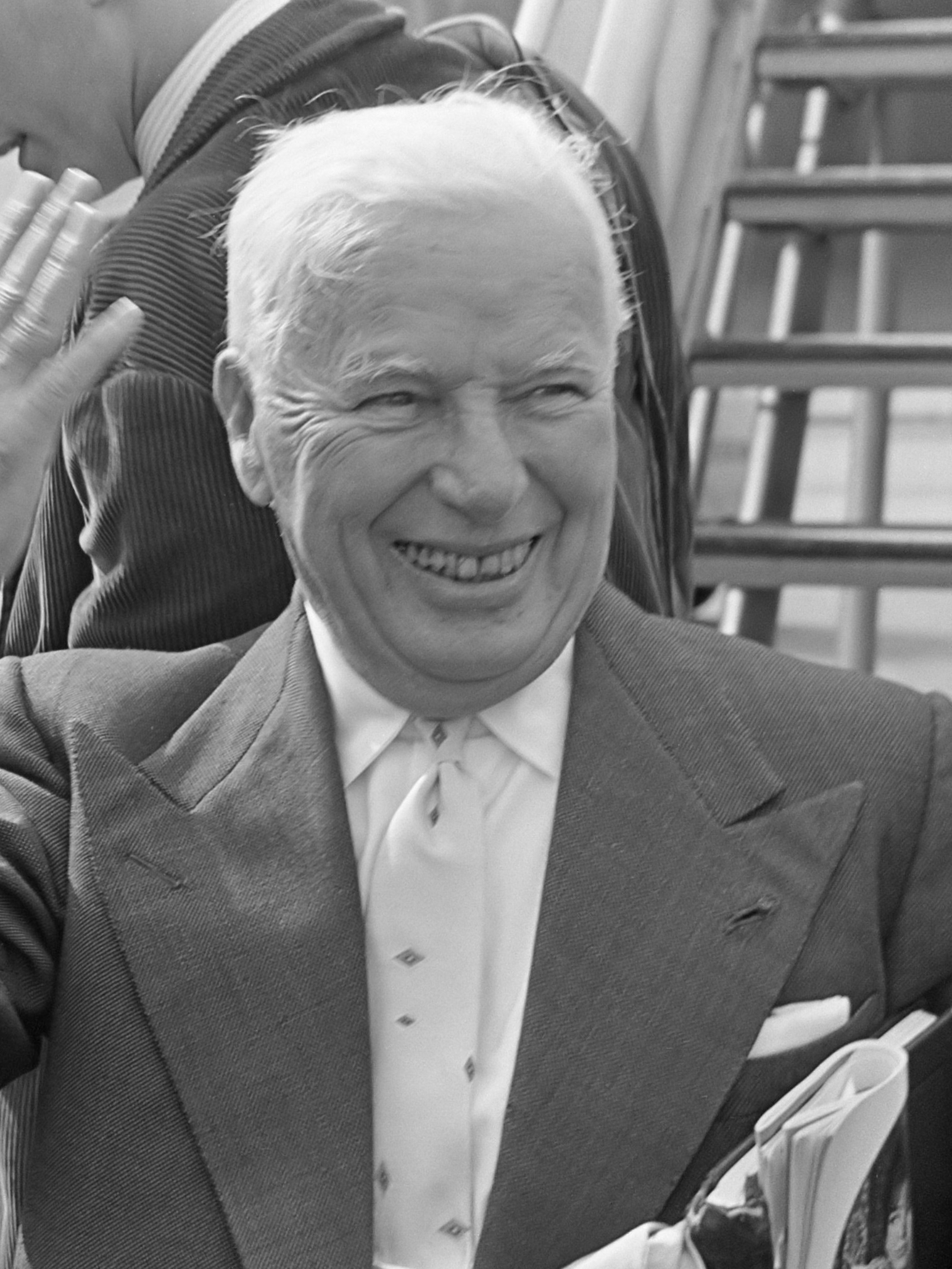
Charlie Chaplin, Best Original Score (Dramatic) co-winner

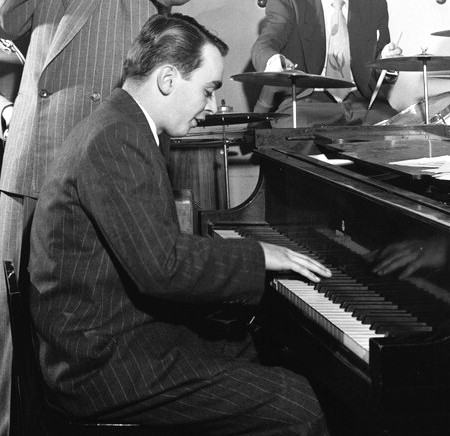
Ralph Burns, Best Score (Adaptation and Original Song) winner

=== Awards ===
Nominees were announced on February 12, 1973. Winners are listed first in boldface.

| **Best Picture**: **The Godfather – Albert S. Ruddy, producer**; Cabaret – Cy Feuer, producer; Deliverance – John Boorman, producer; The Emigrants – Bengt Forslund, producer; Sounder – Robert B. Radnitz, producer | **Best Directing**: **Bob Fosse – Cabaret**; John Boorman – Deliverance; Jan Troell – The Emigrants; Francis Ford Coppola – The Godfather; Joseph L. Mankiewicz – Sleuth |
| **Best Actor**: **Marlon Brando – The Godfather as Vito Corleone (declined)**; Michael Caine – Sleuth as Milo Tindle; Laurence Olivier – Sleuth as Andrew Wyke; Peter O'Toole – The Ruling Class as Jack Gurney; Paul Winfield – Sounder as Nathan Lee Morgan | **Best Actress**: **Liza Minnelli – Cabaret as Sally Bowles**; Diana Ross – Lady Sings the Blues as Billie Holiday; Maggie Smith – Travels with My Aunt as Augusta Bertram; Cicely Tyson – Sounder as Rebecca Morgan; Liv Ullmann – The Emigrants as Kristina Nilsson |
| **Best Actor in a Supporting Role**: **Joel Grey – Cabaret as the M.C.**; Eddie Albert – The Heartbreak Kid as Mr. Corcoran; James Caan – The Godfather as Santino "Sonny" Corleone; Robert Duvall – The Godfather as Tom Hagen; Al Pacino – The Godfather as Michael Corleone | **Best Actress in a Supporting Role**: **Eileen Heckart – Butterflies Are Free as Mrs. Baker**; Jeannie Berlin – The Heartbreak Kid as Lila Kolodny; Geraldine Page – Pete 'n' Tillie as Gertrude Wilson; Susan Tyrrell – Fat City as Oma; Shelley Winters – The Poseidon Adventure as Belle Rosen |
| **Best Writing (Story and Screenplay -- Based on Factual Material or Material Not Previously Published or Produced)**: **The Candidate – Jeremy Larner**; The Discreet Charm of the Bourgeoisie – Luis Buñuel and Jean-Claude Carrière; Lady Sings the Blues – Chris Clark, Suzanne de Passe and Terence McCloy; Murmur of the Heart – Louis Malle; Young Winston – Carl Foreman | **Best Writing (Screenplay -- Based on Material from Another Medium)**: **The Godfather – Francis Ford Coppola and Mario Puzo based on the novel by Puzo**; Cabaret – Jay Presson Allen based on the musical by Fred Ebb and John Kander and the book by Joe Masteroff; The Emigrants – Bengt Forslund and Jan Troell based on the novels The Emigrants and Unto a Good Land by Vilhelm Moberg; Pete 'n' Tillie – Julius J. Epstein based on the story Witch's Milk by Peter De Vries; Sounder – Lonne Elder III based on the novel by William H. Armstrong |
| **Best Foreign Language Film**: **The Discreet Charm of the Bourgeoisie (France) in French – Luis Buñuel**; The Dawns Here Are Quiet (USSR) in Russian – Stanislav Rostotsky; I Love You Rosa (Israel) in Hebrew – Moshé Mizrahi; My Dearest Senorita (Spain) in Spanish – Jaime de Armiñán; The New Land (Sweden) in Swedish – Jan Troell | **Best Documentary (Feature)**: **Marjoe – Sarah Kernochan and Howard Smith**; Ape and Super-Ape – Bert Haanstra; Malcolm X – Arnold Perl (posthumously) and Marvin Worth; Manson – Robert Hendrickson and Laurence Merrick; The Silent Revolution – Eckehard Munck |
| **Best Documentary (Short Subject)**: **This Tiny World – Charles Huguenot van der Linden and Martina Huguenot van der Linden**; Hundertwasser's Rainy Day – Peter Schamoni; K-Z – Giorgio Treves; Selling Out – Tadeusz Jaworski; The Tide of Traffic – Humphrey Swingler | **Best Short Subject (Live Action)**: **Norman Rockwell's World... An American Dream – Richard Barclay**; Frog Story – Ray Gideon and Ron Satlof; Solo – David Adams |
| **Best Short Subject (Animated)**: **A Christmas Carol – Richard Williams**; Kama Sutra Rides Again – Bob Godfrey; Tup Tup – Nedeljko Dragić | **Best Music (Original Dramatic Score)**: **Limelight – Charlie Chaplin, Raymond Rasch (posthumously) and Larry Russell (posthumously)**; Images – John Williams; Napoleon and Samantha – Buddy Baker; The Poseidon Adventure – John Williams; Sleuth – John Addison; ~~The Godfather – Nino Rota~~ (nomination revoked) |
| **Best Music (Scoring: Adaptation and Original Song Score)**: **Cabaret – Adaptated by Ralph Burns**; Lady Sings the Blues – Adapted by Gil Askey; Man of La Mancha – Adapted by Laurence Rosenthal | **Best Music (Song -- Original for the Picture)**: **"The Morning After" from The Poseidon Adventure – Music and Lyrics by Joel Hirschhorn and Al Kasha**; "Ben" from Ben – Music by Walter Scharf; Lyrics by Don Black; "Come Follow, Follow Me" from The Little Ark – Music by Fred Karlin; Lyrics by Marsha Karlin; "Marmalade, Molasses & Honey" from The Life and Times of Judge Roy Bean – Music by Maurice Jarre; Lyrics by Alan and Marilyn Bergman; "Strange Are the Ways of Love" from The Stepmother – Music by Sammy Fain; Lyrics by Paul Francis Webster |
| **Best Sound**: **Cabaret – David Hildyard and Robert Knudson**; Butterflies Are Free – Charles T. Knight and Arthur Piantadosi; The Candidate – Gene Cantamessa and Richard Portman; The Godfather – Bud Grenzbach, Christopher Newman and Richard Portman; The Poseidon Adventure – Herman Lewis and Theodore Soderberg | **Best Art Direction**: **Cabaret – Art Direction: Hans Jürgen Kiebach and Rolf Zehetbauer; Set Decoration: Herbert Strabel**; Lady Sings the Blues – Art Direction: Carl Anderson; Set Decoration: Reg Allen; The Poseidon Adventure – Art Direction: William Creber; Set Decoration: Raphaël Bretton; Travels with My Aunt – Art Direction and Set Decoration: John Box, Robert W. Laing and Gil Parrondo; Young Winston – Art Direction: Donald M. Ashton, Geoffrey Drake, John Graysmark and William Hutchinson; Set Decoration: Peter James |
| **Best Cinematography**: **Cabaret – Geoffrey Unsworth**; 1776 – Harry Stradling Jr.; Butterflies Are Free – Charles Lang; The Poseidon Adventure – Harold E. Stine; Travels with My Aunt – Douglas Slocombe | **Best Costume Design**: **Travels with My Aunt – Anthony Powell**; The Godfather – Anna Hill Johnstone; Lady Sings the Blues – Ray Aghayan, Norma Koch and Bob Mackie; The Poseidon Adventure – Paul Zastupnevich; Young Winston – Anthony Mendleson |
**Best Film Editing**: **Cabaret – David Bretherton**; Deliverance – Tom Priestley; The Godfather – William H. Reynolds and Peter Zinner; The Hot Rock – Fred W. Berger and Frank P. Keller; The Poseidon Adventure – Harold F. Kress

=== Special Achievement Award (Visual Effects) ===
- The Poseidon Adventure – L. B. Abbott and A. D. Flowers.

=== Honorary Awards ===
- To Charles S. Boren, leader for 38 years of the industry's enlightened labor relations and architect of its policy of non-discrimination. With the respect and affection of all who work in films.
- To Edward G. Robinson (†) who achieved greatness as a player, a patron of the arts and a dedicated citizen... in sum, a Renaissance man. From his friends in the industry he loves. (Accepted on his behalf by his wife)

=== Jean Hersholt Humanitarian Award ===
- Rosalind Russell

== Films with multiple nominations and awards ==
Films that received multiple nominations
| Nominations | Film |
|---|---|
| 10 | Cabaret |
| 10 | The Godfather |
| 8 | The Poseidon Adventure (Note: Not including the Special Achievement Award for The Poseidon Adventure.) |
| 5 | Lady Sings the Blues |
| 4 | The Emigrants^{[§]} |
| 4 | Sleuth |
| 4 | Sounder |
| 4 | Travels with My Aunt |
| 3 | Butterflies Are Free |
| 3 | Deliverance |
| 3 | Young Winston |
| 2 | The Candidate |
| 2 | The Discreet Charm of the Bourgeoisie |
| 2 | The Heartbreak Kid |
| 2 | Pete 'n' Tillie |

§ Was also nominated in the previous year for Best Foreign Language Film.

Films that received multiple awards
| Awards | Film |
|---|---|
| 8 | Cabaret |
| 3 | The Godfather |

== Eligibility controversies ==
It was initially announced, on February 12, 1973, that The Godfather received 11 nominations, more than any other film that year. This was reduced to 10 nominations (tied with Cabaret for the most) after a new vote by the academy's music branch, following a controversy over whether Nino Rota's score for The Godfather was eligible for the nomination it received. For the re-balloting, members of the music branch chose from six films: The Godfather and the five films that had been on the shortlist for best original dramatic score but did not get nominated. John Addison's score for Sleuth won this new vote, and thus replaced Rota's score on the official list of nominees. The controversy arose, according to Academy President Daniel Taradash, because the love theme in The Godfather had previously been used by Rota in Fortunella, an Italian movie from 1958. Pacino also did not attend the ceremony; he was allegedly insulted at being nominated for the Academy Award for Best Supporting Actor, when he had more screen time than his co-star and Best Actor-winner Brando, and thus should have received the nomination for Best Actor. Pacino denies this, saying in his memoir, Sonny Boy, that he was "scared" of his sudden fame and never heard the rumor until much later in his life.

The nominations in the category of Best Original Song were not announced in February with the rest of the nominations, reportedly because of "a mixup in balloting". It was later reported that the academy had been considering whether Curtis Mayfield's song "Freddie's Dead" from the film Super Fly should be eligible. The song was ruled ineligible for a nomination because its lyrics were not sung in the film. (The song was released as a single with lyrics, but the version in the film was an instrumental.) Academy governor John Green was quoted as saying: "Times have changed. In the old days, Hollywood made 30 or 40 musicals a year, and there were plenty of songs to choose from. Now there are hardly any, and most of the eligible songs are themes. Both the lyric and the music must be heard on the sound track to be eligible."

== Sacheen Littlefeather's appearance ==
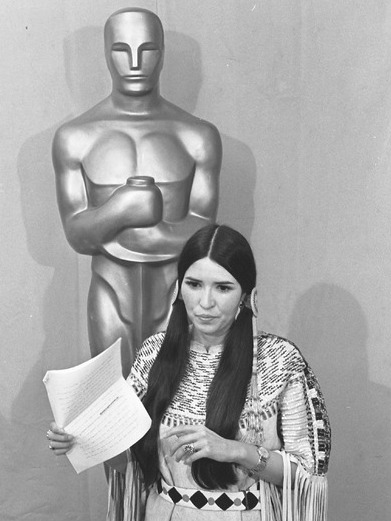
Sacheen Littlefeather holding Marlon Brando's statement at the 45th Academy Awards

Sacheen Littlefeather was an American actress, model, and activist of Native American civil rights who Marlon Brando chose to represent him at the ceremony. Littlefeather took the stage and spoke on Brando's behalf as a form of protest, representing Native Americans.

The audience in the Dorothy Chandler Pavilion was divided between applause and jeers. "I was distressed that people should have booed and whistled and stomped, even though perhaps it was directed at myself," Brando later told Dick Cavett. "They should have at least had the courtesy to listen to her." Her appearance prompted the Academy of Motion Picture Arts and Sciences to rule out future proxy acceptance of Academy Awards. (Oscars for winners unable, or unwilling, to accept in person are now accepted in their behalf by the presenters.)

Both Sacheen Littlefeather and Marty Pasetta, who directed the Academy Awards telecast, claimed that John Wayne had to be restrained by six security guards to prevent him from assaulting Littlefeather. The story was later refuted as having "never happened" by film historian Farran Nehme. She characterised Pasetta's account as "getting more exciting each time it was told".

== Presenters and performers ==
The following individuals, listed in order of appearance, presented awards or performed musical numbers.

Notably, Charlton Heston was late for his role presenting the voting rules, reportedly due to a flat tire. Clint Eastwood, who was slated to present for Best Picture, was asked to fill in. Heston's written dialogue leaned heavily on his role in the movie The Ten Commandments, leading Eastwood to quip, "Come on, flip the card, man. This isn't my bag." Eastwood also famously said on filling in at the last minute, "...They pick the guy who hasn't said but three lines in 12 movies to substitute for him [Heston]". Heston arrived part of the way through the bit, allowing Eastwood to escape.

=== Presenters ===
| Name | Role |
|---|---|
| Hank Simms | Announcer for the 45th Academy Awards |
| Daniel Taradash (AMPAS President) | Giver of opening remarks welcoming guests to the awards ceremony |
| Clint Eastwood; Charlton Heston | Explainers of the voting rules to the public |
| Eddie Albert; Edward Albert | Presenters of the award for Best Sound |
| Merle Oberon | Presenter of the Special Achievement Award for Best Visual Effects |
| Bea Arthur; Peter Boyle | Presenters of the Short Subjects Awards |
| Robert Duvall; Cloris Leachman | Presenters of the award for Best Supporting Actress |
| Elke Sommer; Jack Valenti | Presenters of the award for Best Foreign Language Film |
| John Gavin; Katharine Ross | Presenters of the award for Best Film Editing |
| James Coburn; Diana Ross | Presenters of the award for Best Supporting Actor |
| Richard Walsh | Presenter of the Honorary Award to Charles S. Boren |
| Robert Wagner; Natalie Wood | Presenters of the Documentary Awards |
| Marisa Berenson; Michael Caine | Presenters of the award for Best Costume Design |
| Greer Garson; Laurence Harvey | Presenters of the award for Best Art Direction |
| Dyan Cannon; Burt Reynolds | Presenters of the Music Awards |
| Candice Bergen; Billy Dee Williams | Presenters of the award for Best Cinematography |
| Sonny & Cher | Presenters of the award for Best Song Original for the Picture |
| Charlton Heston | Presenter of the Honorary Award to Edward G. Robinson |
| Frank Sinatra | Presenter of the Jean Hersholt Humanitarian Award |
| Jack Lemmon | Presenter of the Writing Awards |
| Julie Andrews; George Stevens | Presenters of the award for Best Director |
| Roger Moore; Liv Ullmann | Presenters of the award for Best Actor |
| Sacheen Littlefeather | Declined Marlon Brando's Academy Award on his behalf |
| Gene Hackman; Raquel Welch | Presenters of the award for Best Actress |
| Clint Eastwood | Presenter of the award for Best Picture |
| John Wayne | Introducer of the performance of "You Oughta Be in Pictures" |

=== Performers ===
| Name | Role | Performed |
|---|---|---|
| John Williams | Musical arranger and conductor | Orchestral |
| Angela Lansbury | Performer | "Make a Little Magic" |
| Disney characters | Performers | A musical salute to Walt Disney Productions' 50th anniversary |
| Michael Jackson | Performer | "Ben" from Ben |
| Springfield Revival | Performer | "Come Follow, Follow Me" from The Little Ark |
| Glen Campbell; The Mike Curb Congregation | Performer | "Marmalade, Molasses & Honey" from The Life and Times of Judge Roy Bean |
| Connie Stevens | Performer | "The Morning After" from The Poseidon Adventure |
| Diahann Carroll | Performer | "Strange Are the Ways of Love" from The Stepmother |
| Academy Awards Chorus | Performers | "You Oughta Be in Pictures" |

== See also ==
- Sacheen Littlefeather
- 30th Golden Globe Awards
- 1972 in film
- 15th Grammy Awards
- 24th Primetime Emmy Awards
- 25th Primetime Emmy Awards
- 26th British Academy Film Awards
- 27th Tony Awards
