= 26th British Academy Film Awards =

1973 film awards ceremony

- Date: 28 February 1973
- Site: Royal Albert Hall
- Hosted by: Michael Parkinson; John Mills

Highlights
- Best Film: Cabaret
- Best Actor: Gene Hackman; The Poseidon Adventure and The French Connection
- Best Actress: Liza Minnelli; Cabaret
- Most awards: Cabaret (7)
- Most nominations: Cabaret (11)

The 26th British Academy Film Awards, more commonly known as the BAFTAs, took place on 28 February 1973 at the Royal Albert Hall in London, honouring the best national and foreign films of 1972. Presented by the British Academy of Film and Television Arts, accolades were handed out for the best feature-length film and documentaries of any nationality that were screened at British cinemas in 1972.

After receiving the most nominations with 11, Bob Fosse's Cabaret took home the most awards of the night, winning a total of 7 awards. This included; Best Film, Direction (Fosse), Actress (Liza Minnelli), Production Design (Rolf Zehetbauer) and Most Promising Newcomer (Joel Grey). Gene Hackman received Best Actor for his performances in The French Connection and The Poseidon Adventure, whilst Ben Johnson and Cloris Leachman won in the supporting categories for their performances in The Last Picture Show.

The ceremony was hosted by Michael Parkinson and John Mills.

== Winners and nominees ==
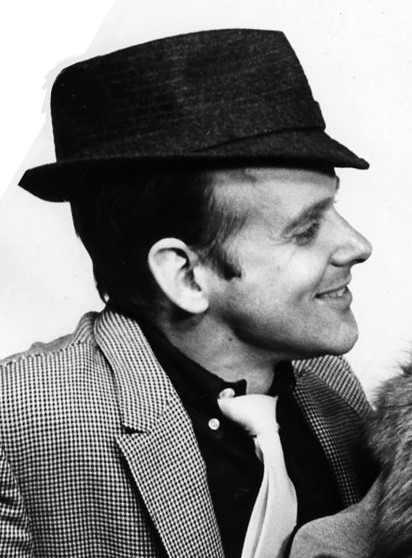
Bob Fosse, Best Film and Best Direction winner

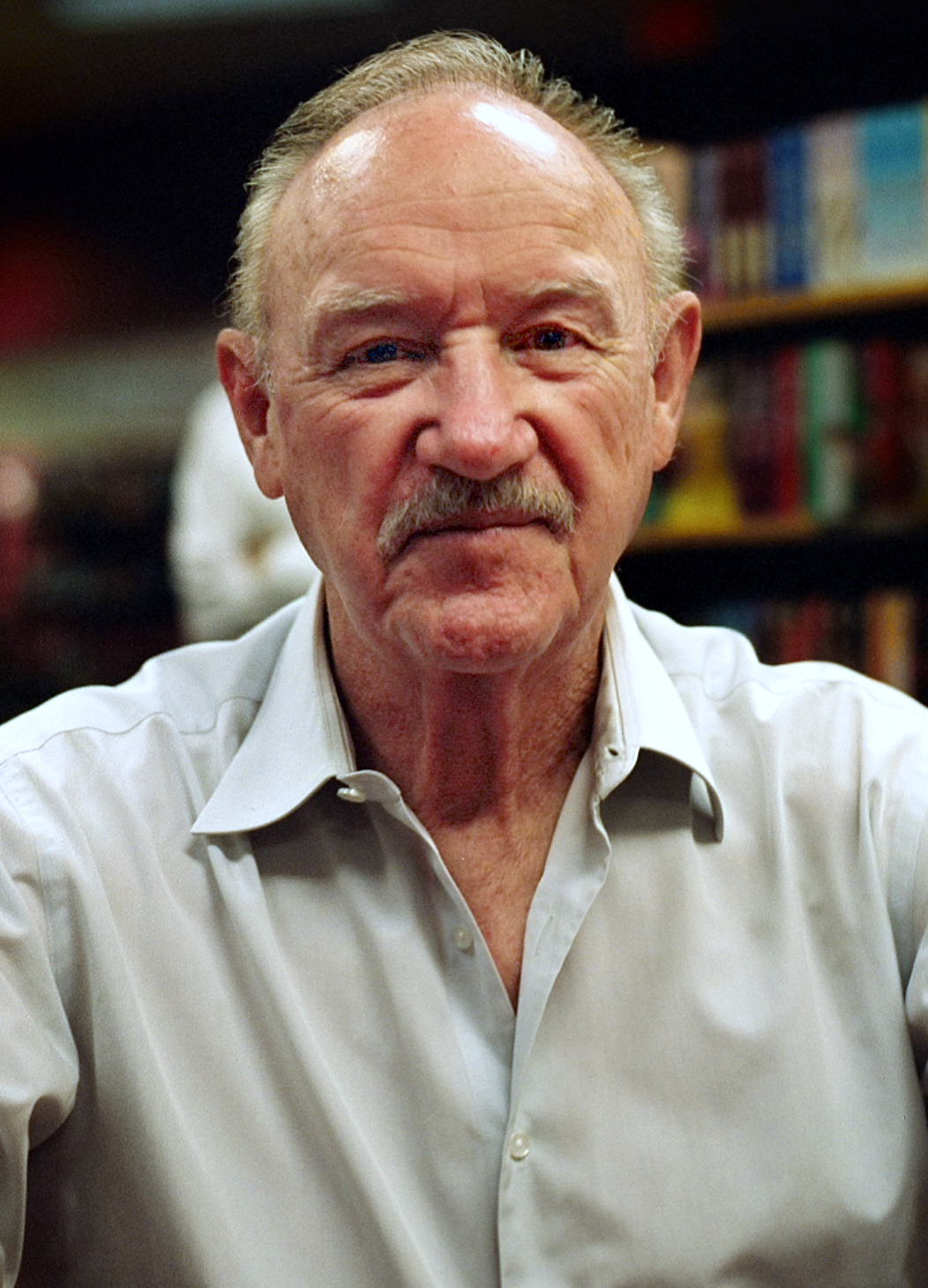
Gene Hackman, Best Actor winner

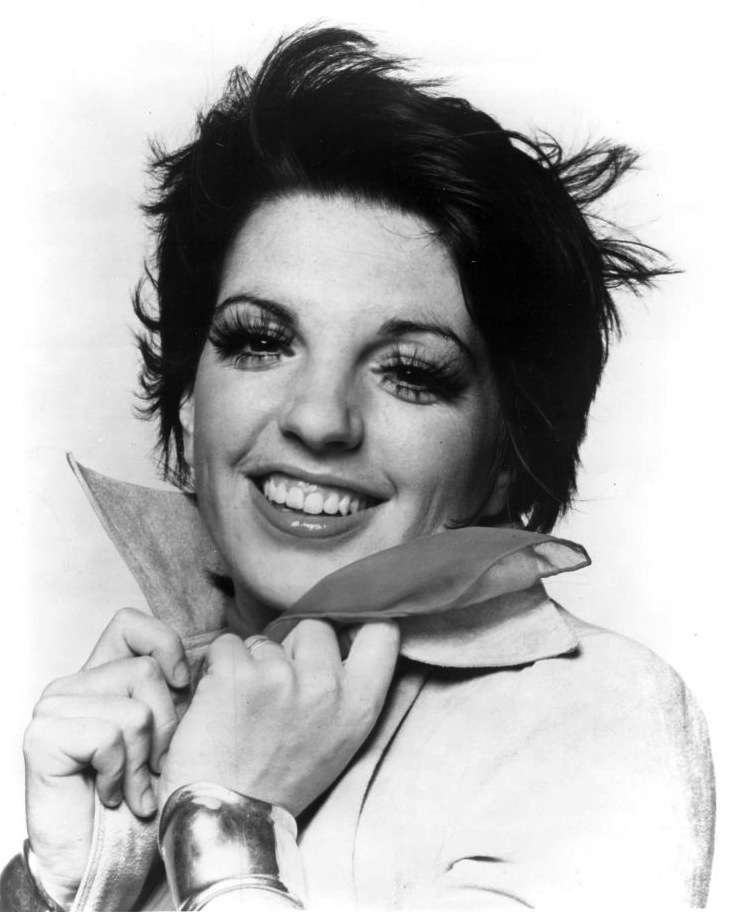
Liza Minnelli, Best Actress winner

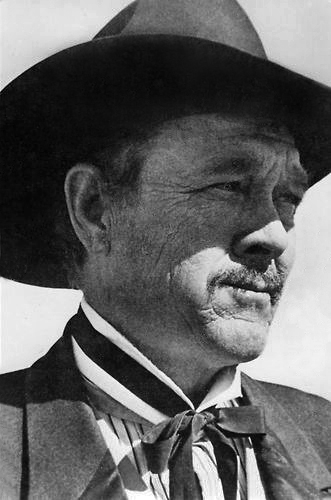
Ben Johnson, Best Supporting Actor winner

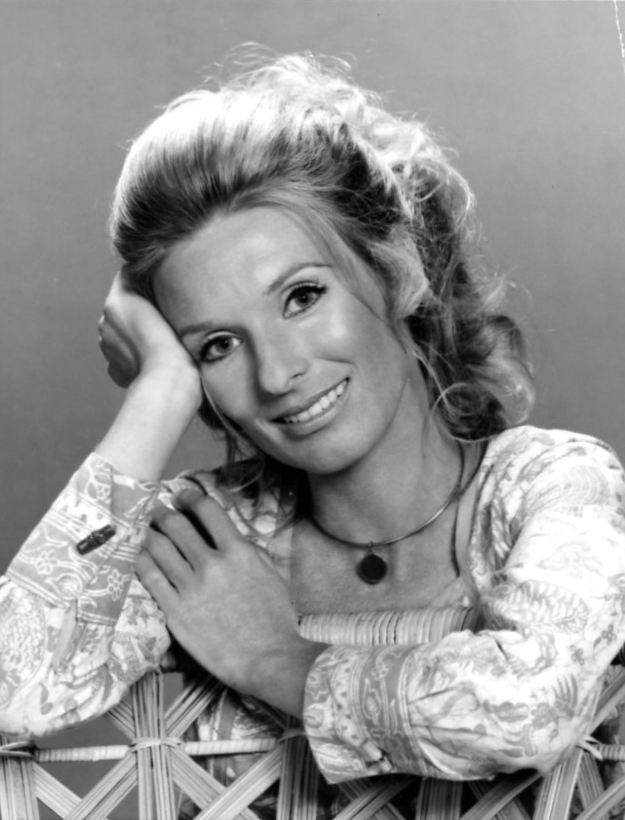
Cloris Leachman, Best Supporting Actress winner

=== Awards ===
Winners are listed first and highlighted in boldface.

**Best Film**: **Cabaret – Bob Fosse**; A Clockwork Orange – Stanley Kubrick; The French Connection – William Friedkin; The Last Picture Show – Peter Bogdanovich	**Best Direction**: **Bob Fosse – Cabaret**; Peter Bogdanovich – The Last Picture Show; Stanley Kubrick – A Clockwork Orange; William Friedkin – The French Connection
**Best Actor in a Leading Role**: **Gene Hackman – The French Connection as Detective Jimmy Doyle**; **Gene Hackman – The Poseidon Adventure as Reverend Frank Scott**; George C. Scott – The Hospital as Doctor Herbert Bock; George C. Scott – They Might Be Giants as Justin; Marlon Brando – The Godfather as Vito Corleone; Marlon Brando – The Nightcomers as Peter Quint; Robert Shaw – Young Winston as Lord Randolph Churchill	**Best Actress in a Leading Role**: **Liza Minnelli – Cabaret as Sally Bowles**; Anne Bancroft – Young Winston as Lady Randolph Churchill; Dorothy Tutin – Savage Messiah as Sophie Brzeska; Stéphane Audran – Le Boucher as Helene Daville
**Best Actor in a Supporting Role**: **Ben Johnson – The Last Picture Show as Sam**; Max Adrian – The Boy Friend as Max Mandeville; Ralph Richardson – Lady Caroline Lamb as George IV; Robert Duvall – The Godfather as Tom Hagen	**Best Actress in a Supporting Role**: **Cloris Leachman – The Last Picture Show as Ruth Popper**; Eileen Brennan – The Last Picture Show as Genevieve; Marisa Berenson – Cabaret as Natalia Landauer; Shelley Winters – The Poseidon Adventure as Belle Rosen
**Best Screenplay**: **The Hospital – Paddy Chayefsky**; **The Last Picture Show – Larry McMurtry and Peter Bogdanovich**; Cabaret – Jay Presson Allen; A Clockwork Orange – Stanley Kubrick	**Best Cinematography**: **Alice's Adventures in Wonderland – Geoffrey Unsworth**; **Cabaret – Geoffrey Unsworth**; A Clockwork Orange – John Alcott; Deliverance – Vilmos Zsigmond; The Garden of the Finzi-Continis – Ennio Guarnieri; Images – Vilmos Zsigmond; McCabe & Mrs. Miller – Vilmos Zsigmond
**Best Costume Design**: **Alice's Adventures in Wonderland – Anthony Mendleson**; **Macbeth – Anthony Mendleson**; **Young Winston – Anthony Mendleson**; Cabaret – Charlotte Flemming; The Godfather – Anna Hill Johnstone	**Best Editing**: **The French Connection – Gerald B. Greenberg**; Cabaret – David Bretherton; A Clockwork Orange – Bill Butler; Deliverance – Tom Priestley
**Best Original Music**: **The Godfather – Nino Rota**; Lady Caroline Lamb – Richard Rodney Bennett; Macbeth – Third Ear Band; Young Winston – Alfred Ralston	**Best Production Design**: **Cabaret – Rolf Zehetbauer**; A Clockwork Orange – John Barry; Lady Caroline Lamb – Carmen Dillon; Young Winston – Geoffrey Drake and Donald M. Ashton
**Best Sound**: **Cabaret – David Hildyard, Robert Knudson and Arthur Piantadosi**; A Clockwork Orange – Brian Blamey, John Jordan and Bill Rowe; Deliverance – Jim Atkinson, Walter Goss and Doug Turner; The French Connection – Chris Newman and Theodore Soderberg	**Best Specialised Film**: **Cutting Oils and Fluids**; We Call It Petrol; What Did You Learn at School Today?; What Is Life?
**John Grierson Award**: **Memorial – James Allen**; History of the Motor Car – Bill Mason; The Tide of Traffic – Derek Williams	**United Nations Award**: **The Garden of the Finzi-Continis – Vittorio De Sica**; A Day in the Death of Joe Egg – Peter Medak; Family Life – Ken Loach; One Day in the Life of Ivan Denisovich – Caspar Wrede
**Most Promising Newcomer to Leading Film Roles**: **Joel Grey – Cabaret as Emcee**; Al Pacino – The Godfather as Michael Corleone; Bud Cort – Harold and Maude as Harold Parker Chasen; Simon Ward – Young Winston as Winston Churchill

== Statistics ==
Films that received multiple nominations
Nominations	Film
11	Cabaret
7	A Clockwork Orange
6	The Last Picture Show
6	Young Winston
5	The French Connection
5	The Godfather
3	Deliverance
3	Lady Caroline Lamb
2	Alice's Adventures in Wonderland
2	The Garden of the Finzi-Continis
2	The Hospital
2	Macbeth
2	The Poseidon Adventure

Films that received multiple awards
Awards	Film
7	Cabaret
3	The Last Picture Show
2	Alice's Adventures in Wonderland
2	The French Connection

== See also ==
- 45th Academy Awards
- 25th Directors Guild of America Awards
- 30th Golden Globes
- 25th Writers Guild of America Awards
