= Young Winston =

1972 film directed by Richard Attenborough

- Theatrical release poster
- Directed by: Richard Attenborough
- Written by: Carl Foreman
- Based on: My Early Life: A Roving Commission; 1930 book by Sir Winston Churchill
- Produced by: Carl Foreman
- Starring: Simon Ward; Robert Shaw; Anne Bancroft; Anthony Hopkins; John Mills
- Narrated by: Simon Ward
- Cinematography: Gerry Turpin
- Edited by: Kevin Connor
- Music by: Alfred Ralston (includes original music and his arrangements of works by Edward Elgar)
- Color process: Eastmancolor
- Distributed by: Columbia Pictures (through Columbia-Warner Distributors)
- Release date: 28 July 1972
- Running time: 157 minutes
- Country: United Kingdom
- Language: English
- Box office: $2,150,000 (US/ Canada rentals)

Young Winston is a 1972 British epic biographical adventure drama war film in Panavision covering the early years of British Prime Minister Winston Churchill, based in particular on his 1930 book, My Early Life. The first part of the film covers Churchill's unhappy schooldays, up to the death of his father. The second half covers his service as a cavalry officer in India and the Sudan, during which he takes part in the cavalry charge at Omdurman, his experiences as a war correspondent in the Second Boer War, during which he is captured and escapes, and his election to Parliament at the age of 26.

Churchill was played by Simon Ward, and the cast included Robert Shaw (as Lord Randolph Churchill), John Mills (as Lord Kitchener), Anthony Hopkins (as David Lloyd George) and Anne Bancroft as Churchill's mother Jennie. Other actors included Patrick Magee, Robert Hardy, Ian Holm, Edward Woodward and Jack Hawkins.

The film was written and produced by Carl Foreman and directed by Richard Attenborough. It was nominated for three Academy Awards: Best Screenplay, Best Art Direction (Donald M. Ashton, Geoffrey Drake, John Graysmark, William Hutchinson, Peter James) and Best Costume Design.

Young Winston was released to cinemas on July 28, 1972.

== Plot ==
16 September 1897: Churchill is a junior officer on the North-West Frontier (between British India and Afghanistan) determined to make a name for himself and to become a member of Parliament. As the older Churchill (voiced by Simon Ward) narrates, events shift back to his childhood. As a boy, Churchill is sent to a preparatory boarding school but is unhappy there and is removed by his parents after a particularly vicious caning by the sadistic headmaster. Later, at the entrance examination to Harrow School, Churchill submits a blank paper; however the headmaster, James Welldon, sees Churchill's potential and accepts him. One evening he recites a long poem of 1000 lines at a Harrow presentation. His nanny comes to listen but his parents do not, despite Churchill's express invitation. Churchill would later describe her as the only person who never let him down.

Meanwhile, Churchill's father Lord Randolph destroys his career by resigning as Chancellor of the Exchequer; George Buckle, editor of The Times, refuses to support his position. Doctors Roose and Buzzard inform Lady Randolph that her husband has an incurable disease, will probably die in five or six years, and that they must never again have "physical relations". (Note: Believed at the time, and implied in the film, to be syphilis, although many of Lord Randolph's modern biographers believe he may have had a brain tumour.)

One morning, Churchill comes down to breakfast but his behaviour infuriates his father. Lord Randolph angrily sends his son up to his room, but after a conversation with his wife he goes to make up with his son, who is playing with his large collection of tin soldiers. Churchill eagerly accepts his father's suggestion that he go into the army; his father later admits to his mother that he feels Winston lacks the brains for university or a career as a barrister. After three attempts, Churchill is finally accepted by Sandhurst but his father is not pleased because he finished seventh from the bottom of the class and is only eligible to enter the cavalry which costs an extra £200 a year (equivalent to £22,200 in 2025) for a horse. Lord Randolph - clearly ill and making a number of factual errors about his son - scolds Churchill and warns him to face up to his responsibilities at Sandhurst and that if he does not make something of himself by 21 he will no longer support him.

Still only in his mid forties, Lord Randolph, once a brilliant debater, makes an incoherent speech in Parliament, witnessed by both his wife and Winston. His death spells the end of Churchill's dream of entering Parliament at his side. Churchill graduates from Sandhurst near the top of the class, he becomes a second lieutenant and eventually goes to India and then takes part in the cavalry charge at the Battle of Omdurman in the Sudan. Later, he goes to South Africa to work as a war correspondent during the Anglo-Boer War. While travelling by armoured train, Churchill and soldiers are ambushed by Boers. They try to retreat but crash into a barricade of rocks on the railway track. Churchill courageously organises the soldiers to push the derailed carriage off the track so the train can proceed with the wounded, but he and the others are captured by the Boers. Churchill escapes, getting help from mine manager Howard, (Note: one of Howard's colleagues mentions that he is from Oldham, where Churchill had recently been defeated at the 1899 Oldham by-election) hiding three nights in the mine then riding a goods train into neutral Portuguese territory. He returns to England a hero and is elected an MP for the parliamentary seat of Oldham at the 1900 United Kingdom general election, at which the Conservatives are re-elected. With the encouragement of opposition Liberal MP Lloyd George, (Note: Churchill would defect to the Liberal Party in 1904; he and Lloyd George would be leading ministers and, at times, close allies, in the Liberal Government of 1905-1915. Churchill was then a leading member of Lloyd George's coalition government between 1917 and 1922. He rejoined the Conservatives in the mid 1920s.) to the dismay of his mother and annoyance of senior Conservatives, he takes up his father's campaign to limit spending on the military.

The film ends with Churchill narrating events that follow including his marriage to Clementine Hozier seven years later. Newsreel footage shows Churchill appearing on the balcony with the royal family on VE Day, May 1945.

== Cast ==
- Robert Shaw as Lord Randolph Churchill: Churchill's father.
- Anne Bancroft as Lady Randolph Churchill: Churchill's mother.
- Simon Ward as Winston Churchill: cavalry officer, war correspondent and MP. Ward also voiced the older Churchill.
- Michael Audreson as Winston Churchill: He portrayed Churchill during his teenage years at Harrow.
- Jack Hawkins as James Welldon: Headmaster of Harrow School.
- Ian Holm as George Earle Buckle: editor of The Times.
- Anthony Hopkins as David Lloyd George: a politician and rising member of the Liberal Party.
- Patrick Magee as General Sir Bindon Blood: an Army commander on the North-West Frontier of India.
- Edward Woodward as Captain Aylmer Haldane: an Army officer.
- John Mills as Herbert Kitchener, 1st Earl Kitchener: commander of the Anglo-Egyptian Army during the Battle of Omdurman. (Note: Kitchener was a brigadier-general at the time, but is incorrectly shown wearing the insignia of a full general, a rank which he did not attain until the Boer War)
- Peter Cellier as Captain 35th Sikhs
- Ronald Hines as Adjutant 35th Sikhs
- Pat Heywood as Elizabeth Ann Everest: Churchill's nanny who acts as his confidante.
- Laurence Naismith as Robert Gascoyne-Cecil, 3rd Marquess of Salisbury, Conservative Party leader
- Basil Dignam as Joseph Chamberlain (Note: The film inaccurately portrays Chamberlain as a close colleague of Salisbury and his nephew Arthur Balfour in the early 1880s, whilst the Conservatives were in opposition. He was in fact President of the Board of Trade in Gladstone's Liberal Cabinet, and a bitter critic of Salisbury, at the time. The Liberal Party split over Irish Home Rule in 1886. In 1895, after Lord Randolph's death, Chamberlain's small Liberal Unionist Party entered into coalition with the Conservatives, and he is shown correctly sitting aside Balfour on the front bench as Churchill speaks.)
- Jeremy Child as Austen Chamberlain: Joseph Chamberlain's son.
- Robert Hardy as Headmaster of Churchill's first school. (Note: He later portrayed Churchill in Winston Churchill: The Wilderness Years.)
- Pippa Steel as Clementine Hozier: Churchill's future wife.
- Jane Seymour as Pamela Plowden
- Patrick Holt as Colonel Martin

== Production ==
Carl Foreman was invited to meet Winston Churchill after he had seen and enjoyed Foreman's 1961 production of The Guns of Navarone. At their meeting, Churchill suggested that his book My Early Life would make an excellent film.

In 1967, Foreman announced that James Fox would play Churchill.

Foreman was impressed by Richard Attenborough's Oh! What a Lovely War and at first wanted him to both direct and play Lord Randolph Churchill; Attenborough declined the latter offer.

The film was made in Morocco and the United Kingdom, with several scenes shot at Penwyllt and Coelbren, Powys, on the edge of the Brecon Beacons, and the scene where Churchill learnt to ride at the Cavalry Riding School building at Beaumont Barracks in Aldershot.

== Reception ==
=== Box office ===
The film was one of the most popular films in 1972 at the British box office.

The film's U.S. premiere was held at the MacArthur Theatre in Washington, D.C., attended by Ward, members of the British embassy and as well as invited guests from the area, including the symphonic band from Winston Churchill High School in nearby Potomac, Maryland, conducted by Ronald Shurie. The film was premiered in the UK with Susan Hampshire and the youngest Winston of the cast on stage at the time. The band of the Royal Hussars (PWO) played at the screening.

=== Critical reception ===
Young Winston received mixed reviews upon its release. On Rotten Tomatoes, it was reported that 55% of critics gave the film a positive review based on 11 reviews, with an average score of 5/10.

=== Accolades ===
Award	Category	Nominee(s)	Result	Ref.
Academy Awards	Best Original Screenplay	Carl Foreman	Nominated	
Academy Awards	Best Art Direction	Art Direction: Donald M. Ashton, Geoffrey Drake, John Graysmark, and William Hutchinson; Set Decoration: Peter James	Nominated	
Academy Awards	Best Costume Design	Anthony Mendleson	Nominated	
British Academy Film Awards	Best Actor in a Leading Role	Robert Shaw	Nominated	
British Academy Film Awards	Best Actress in a Leading Role	Anne Bancroft	Nominated	
British Academy Film Awards	Anthony Asquith Memorial Award	Alfred Ralston	Nominated	
British Academy Film Awards	Best Art Direction	Geoffrey Drake and Donald M. Ashton	Nominated	
British Academy Film Awards	Best Costume Design	Anthony Mendleson (also for Alice's Adventures in Wonderland and Macbeth)	Won	
British Academy Film Awards	Most Promising Newcomer to Leading Film Roles	Simon Ward	Nominated	
Golden Globe Awards	Best English-Language Foreign Film		Won	
Golden Globe Awards	Most Promising Newcomer – Male	Simon Ward	Nominated	
New York Film Critics Circle Awards	Best Supporting Actor	Robert Shaw	Runner-up	
Writers' Guild of Great Britain Awards	Best British Screenplay	Carl Foreman	Won	

== Home media release ==
As of July 2009, the longest edition available on DVD was Young Winston: Special Edition at 146 minutes, cut from the original U.S. theatrical release which was 157 minutes. VHS tapes cut the film to just 124 minutes. The "Signature Series" edition, released by Sony Entertainment in Australia 2009 (147 minutes) opens with nearly four minutes of black screen accompanied by a medley of English tunes; an "intermission" of three minutes' black screen separates the two sections. The fully unabridged version was released on Blu-ray by British distributor Powerhouse Films in October 2019. Another edition was released on 29 August 2022 by Powerhouse Films.
