= 1973 Academy Awards =

1973 Academy Awards may refer to:

- 45th Academy Awards, the Academy Awards ceremony that took place in 1973
- 46th Academy Awards, the 1974 ceremony honoring the best in film for 1973
