= 23rd British Academy Film Awards =

1970 film awards ceremony

- Date: 8 March 1970

Highlights
- Best Film: Midnight Cowboy
- Best Actor: Dustin Hoffman; John and Mary and Midnight Cowboy
- Best Actress: Maggie Smith; The Prime of Miss Jean Brodie
- Most awards: Midnight Cowboy & Oh! What a Lovely War (6)
- Most nominations: Women in Love (11)

The 23rd British Academy Film Awards, given by the British Academy of Film and Television Arts on 8 March 1970, honoured the best films of 1969.

== Winners and nominees ==
Dustin Hoffman, Best Actor winner

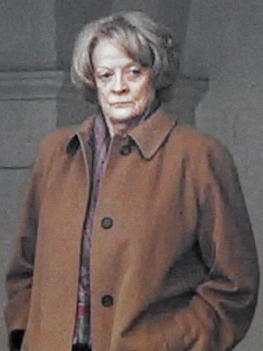
Maggie Smith, Best Actress winner

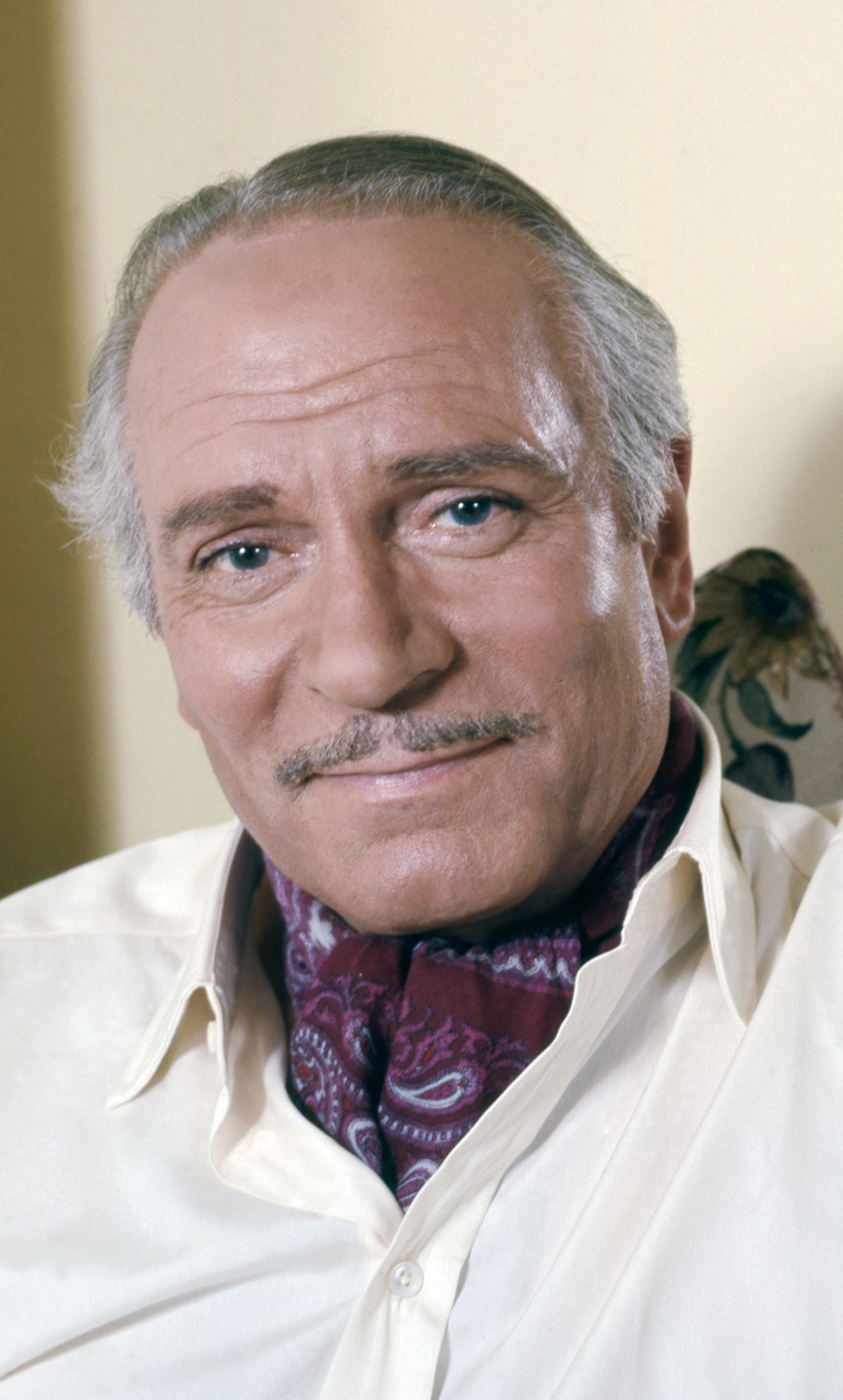
Laurence Olivier, Best Supporting Actor winner

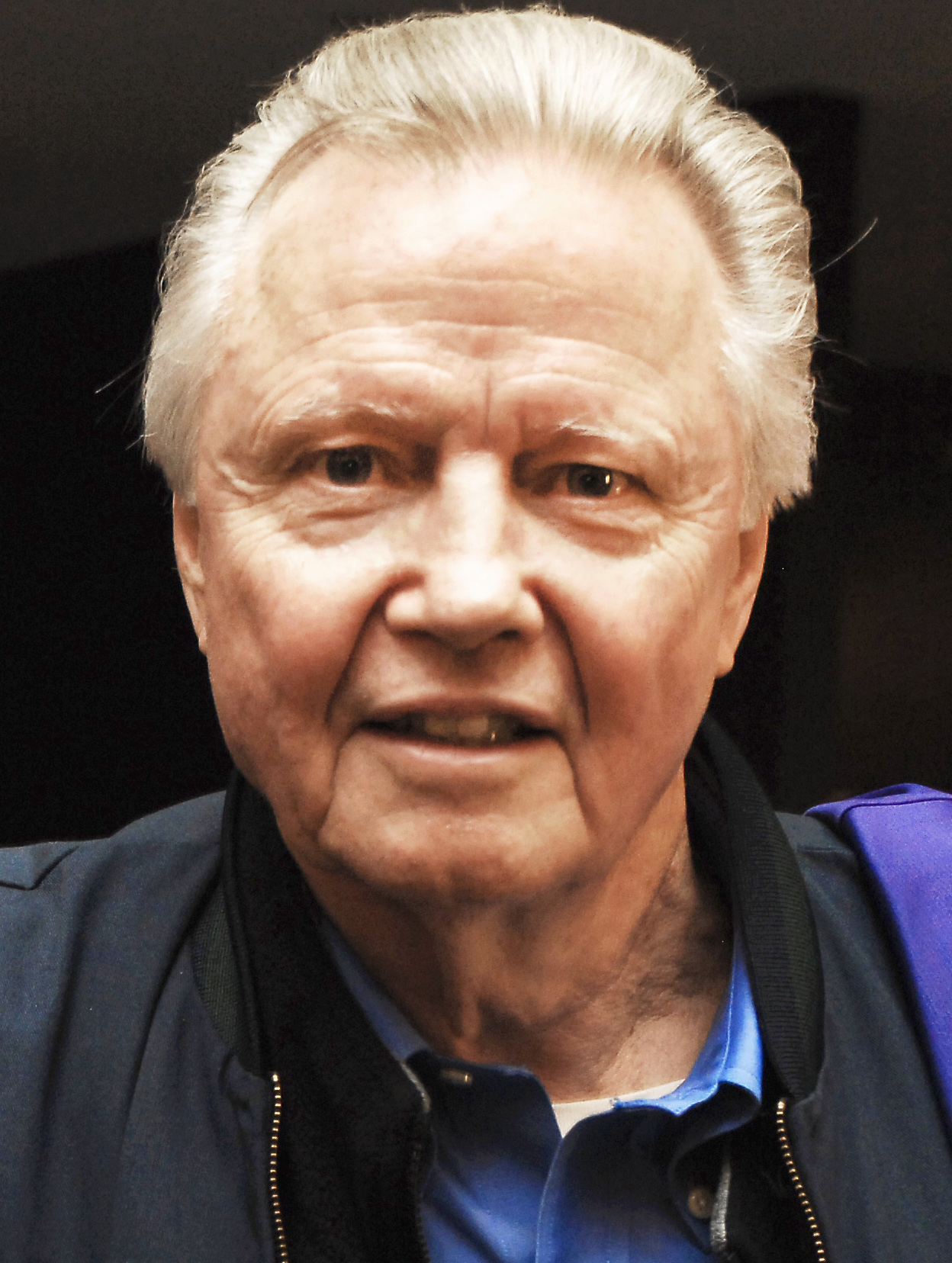
Jon Voight, Best Newcomer winner

Best Film Midnight Cowboy – John Schlesinger: Oh! What a Lovely War – Richard Attenborough; Women in Love – Ken Russell; Z – Costa-Gavras	Best Direction John Schlesinger – Midnight Cowboy: Ken Russell – Women in Love; Peter Yates – Bullitt; Richard Attenborough – Oh! What a Lovely War
Best Actor in a Leading Role Dustin Hoffman – John and Mary as John; Dustin Hoffman – Midnight Cowboy as Enrico Salvatore Rizzo: Alan Bates – Women in Love as Rupert Birkin; Nicol Williamson – Inadmissible Evidence as Bill Maitland; Walter Matthau – Hello, Dolly! as Horace Vandergelder; Walter Matthau – The Secret Life of an American Wife as Movie Star	Best Actress in a Leading Role Maggie Smith – The Prime of Miss Jean Brodie as Jean Brodie: Barbra Streisand – Funny Girl as Fanny Brice; Barbra Streisand – Hello, Dolly! as Dolly Levi; Glenda Jackson – Women in Love as Gudrun Brangwan; Mia Farrow – John and Mary as Mary; Mia Farrow – Rosemary's Baby as Rosemary Woodhouse; Mia Farrow – Secret Ceremony as Cenci
Best Actor in a Supporting Role Laurence Olivier – Oh! What a Lovely War as John French: Jack Klugman – Goodbye, Columbus as Ben Patimkin; Jack Nicholson – Easy Rider as George Hanson; Robert Vaughn – Bullitt as Senator Walter Chalmers	Best Actress in a Supporting Role Celia Johnson – The Prime of Miss Jean Brodie as Miss Mackay: Mary Wimbush – Oh! What a Lovely War as Mary Smith; Pamela Franklin – The Prime of Miss Jean Brodie as Sandy; Peggy Ashcroft – Three into Two Won't Go as Belle
Best Screenplay Midnight Cowboy – Waldo Salt: Goodbye, Columbus – Arnold Schulman; Women in Love – Larry Kramer; Z – Costa-Gavras and Jorge Semprún	Best Cinematography Oh! What a Lovely War – Gerry Turpin: Bullitt – William A. Fraker; Funny Girl – Harry Stradling; Hello, Dolly! – Harry Stradling; The Magus – Billy Williams; Women in Love – Billy Williams
Best Costume Design Oh! What a Lovely War – Anthony Mendleson: Funny Girl – Irene Sharaff; Isadora – Ruth Myers; Women in Love – Shirley Ann Russell	Best Editing Midnight Cowboy – Hugh A. Robertson: Bullitt – Frank P. Keller; Oh! What a Lovely War – Kevin Connor; Z – Françoise Bonnot
Best Original Music Z – Mikis Theodorakis: Secret Ceremony – Richard Rodney Bennett; The Thomas Crown Affair – Michel Legrand; Women in Love – Georges Delerue	Best Production Design Oh! What a Lovely War – Donald M. Ashton: Hello, Dolly! – John DeCuir; War and Peace – Mikhail Bogdanov and Gennady Myasnikov; Women in Love – Luciana Arrighi
Best Sound Oh! What a Lovely War – Don Challis and Simon Kaye: Battle of Britain – Ted Mason and Jim Shields; Bullitt – Edwin Scheid; Isadora – Terry Rawlings; Women in Love – Terry Rawlings	Best Documentary Prologue – National Film Board of Canada
Best Short Film Picture to Post – Sarah Erulkar: Barbican – Robin Contelon; Birthday – Franc Roddam; A Test of Violence – Stuart Cooper	Best Specialised Film Let There Be Light – Peter De Normanville: The Behaviour Game – Ronald Spencer; Isotopes In Action – Ken McCready; Mullardability – Rene Basilico
Most Promising Newcomer to Leading Film Roles Jon Voight – Midnight Cowboy as Joe Buck: Ali MacGraw – Goodbye, Columbus as Brenda Patimkin; Jennie Linden – Women in Love as Ursula Brangwen; Kim Darby – True Grit as Mattie Ross	United Nations Award Oh! What a Lovely War – Richard Attenborough: Ådalen 31 – Bo Widerberg; Midnight Cowboy – John Schlesinger; Z – Costa-Gavras

== Statistics ==
Films that received multiple nominations
Nominations	Film
11	Women in Love
10	Oh! What a Lovely War
7	Midnight Cowboy
5	Bullitt
5	Z
4	Hello, Dolly!
3	Funny Girl
3	Goodbye, Columbus
3	The Prime of Miss Jean Brodie
2	Isadora
2	John and Mary
2	Secret Ceremony

Films that received multiple awards
Awards	Film
6	Midnight Cowboy
6	Oh! What a Lovely War
2	The Prime of Miss Jean Brodie

== See also ==
- 42nd Academy Awards
- 22nd Directors Guild of America Awards
- 27th Golden Globe Awards
- 22nd Writers Guild of America Awards
