= John Graysmark =

British production designer

- Born: 26 March 1935
- Died: 10 October 2010 (aged 75)
- Occupation: Production designer
- Years active: 1957–2005

John Graysmark (26 March 1935 – 10 October 2010) was a British production designer. He was nominated for two Academy Awards in the category Best Art Direction.

Graysmark was involved with film from an early age, through his father, who was construction co-ordinator at Elstree Studios. Graysmark attended a specialist building and architectural school from the age of 13, then worked in architecture for five years. At the age of 21, through his father, Graysmark found work on his first film, Anastasia, as a draughtsman.

Benefiting from his father's advice and contacts, within 5 years Graysmark had met or worked with the leading British film designers or art directors of the time, including John Box, Ken Adam, Don Ashton, Geoff Drake and Tony Masters.

During 20 years in the art department, Graysmark worked on such films as Lawrence of Arabia, The Guns of Navarone, 2001, Young Winston (which earned him an Academy Award nomination), The Man with the Golden Gun and Escape to Athena.

Ragtime (1981) was a turning point in Graysmark's career, the first film he did with the title production designer. Having worked for producer Dino de Laurentiis on 1980s Flash Gordon as supervising art director, under Italian designers Ferdinando Scarfiotti and Danilo Donati, Graysmark was later contacted by de Laurentiis, who offered him Ragtime as designer. Graysmark received another Oscar nomination for designing the movie's New York 1906 setting.

== Selected filmography ==
As Production Designer:

- Robin Hood: Prince of Thieves (1991)
- White Hunter Black Heart (1990)
- Gorillas in the Mist (1988)
- Superman IV: The Quest for Peace (1987)
- Duet for One (1986)
- Club Paradise (1986)
- Lifeforce (1985)
- The Bounty (1984)

As Art Director:

- Firefox (1982)
- Ragtime (1981)
- Flash Gordon (1980)
- Young Winston (1972)
- Tam Lin (1970)
