= National Board of Review Awards 1971 =

Annual US film awards ceremony

43rd National Board of Review Awards

January 3, 1972

The 43rd National Board of Review Awards were announced on January 3, 1972.

== Top Ten Films ==
1. Macbeth
2. The Boy Friend
3. One Day in the Life of Ivan Denisovich
4. The French Connection
5. The Last Picture Show
6. Nicholas and Alexandra
7. The Go-Between
8. King Lear
9. The Tales of Beatrix Potter
10. Death in Venice

== Top Foreign Films ==
1. Claire's Knee
2. Bed and Board
3. The Clowns
4. The Garden of the Finzi-Continis
5. The Conformist

== Winners ==
- Best Film:
  - Macbeth
- Best Foreign Film:
  - Claire's Knee
- Best Actor:
  - Gene Hackman - The French Connection
- Best Actress:
  - Irene Papas - The Trojan Women
- Best Supporting Actor:
  - Ben Johnson - The Last Picture Show
- Best Supporting Actress:
  - Cloris Leachman - The Last Picture Show
- Best Director:
  - Ken Russell - The Devils, The Boy Friend
