= Alice's Adventures in Wonderland (1972 film) =

1972 British musical film by William Sterling

- Theatrical release poster
- Directed by: William Sterling
- Written by: William Sterling; Don Black (lyrics); Lewis Carroll (novel)
- Based on: Alice's Adventures in Wonderland and Through the Looking-Glass by Lewis Carroll
- Produced by: Derek Horne
- Starring: Hywel Bennett; Michael Crawford; Robert Helpmann; Michael Hordern; Michael Jayston; Davy Kaye; Roy Kinnear; Spike Milligan; Dudley Moore; Dennis Price; Ralph Richardson; Flora Robson; Peter Sellers; Rodney Bewes; Fiona Fullerton
- Cinematography: Geoffrey Unsworth
- Edited by: Peter Weatherley
- Music by: John Barry
- Production company: Josef Shaftel Productions
- Distributed by: Fox-Rank Distributors
- Release dates: November 20, 1972 (United States); December 4, 1972 (United Kingdom)
- Running time: 101 minutes
- Country: United Kingdom
- Language: English
- Budget: £700,000 or $1.5 million
- Box office: $9.1 million

Alice's Adventures in Wonderland is a 1972 British musical film directed by Australian filmmaker William Sterling, based on Lewis Carroll's 1865 novel of the same name and its 1871 sequel, Through the Looking-Glass. It had a distinguished ensemble cast and a musical score composed by John Barry with lyrics written by Don Black. In addition, make-up artist Stuart Freeborn created film visuals based on the original drawings by John Tenniel from the first edition of the novel.

At the 26th British Academy Film Awards, the film won both of its nominated categories, including Best Cinematography and Best Costume Design.

== Plot ==
Alice is a little girl living in England. One day, she sees a white rabbit, follows it and ends up getting swept away in a rabbit hole to Wonderland, a place unlike anything she has seen before. There, Alice finds a door and realizes it is too small for her. She finds a bottle that says “Drink Me”, she drinks it and starts to get smaller. However, Alice realizes she will not be able to go through the door without the key. Alice then finds a cookie that reads “Eat Me”. While eating it, Alice grows in size again, starts singing about how big she is and cries. Her tears flood the room, and she becomes small again. Alice starts to find talking animals, like the Cheshire Cat and the White Rabbit. Alice ends up at the rabbit's house and drinks a bottle to change sizes again. Alice ends up being too big for the White Rabbit, so she changes back to her regular size. She joins a tea party, with a man named the Mad Hatter, eventually gets fed up with Wonderland's inhabitants and returns home.

== Cast ==
- Fiona Fullerton - Alice
- Michael Jayston - Dodgson
- Hywel Bennett - Duckworth
- Michael Crawford - White Rabbit
- Davy Kaye - Mouse
- William Ellis - Dodo
- Freddie Earlle - Guinea Pig Pat
- Julian Chagrin - Bill the Lizard
- Mike Elles - Guinea Pig Two
- Ralph Richardson - Caterpillar
- Freddie and Frank Cox - Tweedledum and Tweedledee
- Peter O'Farrell - Fish Footman
- Ian Trigger - Frog Footman
- Peter Bull - Duchess
- Patsy Rowlands - Cook
- Roy Kinnear - Cheshire Cat
- Robert Helpmann - Mad Hatter
- Peter Sellers - March Hare
- Dudley Moore - Dormouse
- Dennis Waterman - 2 of Spades
- Ray Brooks - 5 of Spades
- Richard Warwick - 7 of Spades
- Flora Robson - Queen of Hearts
- Dennis Price - King of Hearts
- Rodney Bewes - Knave of Hearts
- Spike Milligan - Gryphon
- Michael Hordern - Mock Turtle
- Victoria Shallard - Lorina
- Pippa Vickers - Edith
- Ray Edwards - Eaglet
- Stanley Bates - Monkey
- Melita Manger - Squirrel
- Angela Morgan - Lory
- June Kidd - Magpie
- Michael Reardon - Frog
- Brian Tipping - Duck

== Production ==
=== Casting ===
It was originally intended to cast an actress who was close to the age of Alice in the original book. They began their search looking for girls who were between seven and ten years old. This concept was later scrapped when they realized that most girls of that age "lose their teeth, lisp a great deal, and have short attention spans."

When the decision was made to audition older actresses, the director, William Sterling, orchestrated a nationwide search across Great Britain for an unknown young actress to play the title role of Alice. Over 2,000 girls between the ages of thirteen and seventeen auditioned for this highly sought after role. This search had been considered to be one of the biggest in the UK since Franco Zeffirelli's search for the roles of Romeo and Juliet six years earlier.

Some actresses who auditioned for the role of Alice included Lynne Frederick, Rosalyn Landor, Karen Dotrice, Deborah Makepeace, and Chloe Franks. Landor, who had just turned thirteen at the time, impressed everyone at her audition and was asked back a few times, but the producers and director ultimately decided that she was too young. Frederick was nearly eighteen at the time of her audition, and after doing a few screen tests was deemed too sophisticated and mature for the part. Landor and Frederick were later cast in the Lionel Jeffries film The Amazing Mr. Blunden (1972), which came out the same year as Alice's Adventures in Wonderland (1972).

Fifteen year old Fiona Fullerton was ultimately cast as Alice. For the role of Alice, Fullerton had her long hip length brown hair dyed chestnut blonde. Fullerton would later star on stage in London's West End in the musicals Camelot and Nymph Errant, singing on both productions' cast recordings.

Robert Helpmann had worked with Sterling several times in Australia.

=== Behind-the-Scenes Featurette ===
An extensive behind-the-scenes featurette detailing the film's entire production titled Movimakers in Wonderland was released shortly before the film's premiere in 1972.

=== Deleted Scenes ===
Two songs appear on the film's soundtrack but are not in the final cut of the film: "I've Never Been This Far Before" performed by Alice when she enters the garden outside the Queen of Heart's palace, and "The Moral Song" sung by the Duchess to Alice during the Croquet Game. A dialogue scene was filmed between Alice and the Cheshire Cat, with the latter perched in a tree. Although some stills survive, the footage itself was cut from the final print and may no longer exist.

== Release ==
American National Enterprises paid Joseph Shaftel $2.5 million for the American distribution rights.

== Soundtrack ==
The Duchess Is Waiting
Lyrics by Don Black
Music by John Barry
Performed by Michael Crawford

Curiouser And Curiouser
Lyrics by Don Black
Music by John Barry
Performed by Fiona Fullerton

You've Got To Know When To Stop
Lyrics by Don Black
Music by John Barry
Performed by Davy Kaye

The Royal Processions
Music by John Barry

The Last Word Is Mine
Lyrics by Don Black
Music by John Barry
Performed by Michael Crawford and Fiona Fullerton

Digging For Apples
Lyrics by Don Black
Music by John Barry
Performed by Freddie Earlle

There Goes Bill
Lyrics by Don Black
Music by John Barry
Performed by Freddie Earlle and Mike Elles

How Doth The Little Crocodile
Lyrics by Don Black
Music by John Barry
Performed by Fiona Fullerton

Dum And Dee Dance (Nursery Rhyme)
Lyrics by Lewis Carroll and Don Black
Music by John Barry
Performed by Fiona Fullerton

From The Queen, An Invitation for the Duchess To Play Croquet
Lyrics by Don Black
Music by John Barry
Performed by Peter O'Farrell and Ian Trigger

The Duchess's Lullaby
Lyrics by Lewis Carroll and Don Black
Music by John Barry
Performed by Peter Bull and Patsy Rowlands

It's More Like A Pig Than A Baby
Lyrics by Don Black
Music by John Barry
Performed by Fiona Fullerton

I See What I Eat
Lyrics by Don Black
Music by John Barry
Performed by Fiona Fullerton

Twinkle, Twinkle, Little Bat
Lyrics by Don Black
Music by John Barry
Performed by Robert Helpmann, Dudley Moore

The Pun Song
Lyrics by Don Black
Music by John Barry
Performed by Robert Helpmann, Peter Sellers, Dudley Moore and Fiona Fullerton

Off With Their Heads
Lyrics by Don Black
Music by John Barry
Performed by Flora Robson

The Croquet Game
Music by John Barry

Off With Their Heads (Reprise)
Lyrics by Don Black
Music by John Barry
Performed by Flora Robson

I've Never Been This Far Before
Lyrics by Don Black
Music by John Barry
Performed by Fiona Fullerton

The Moral Song
Lyrics by Lewis Carroll and Don Black
Music by John Barry
Performed by Peter Bull

The Me I Never Knew
Lyrics by Don Black
Music by John Barry
Performed by Fiona Fullerton

The Lobster Quadrille (The Mock Turtle's Song)
Music by John Barry

Will You Walk A Little Faster, Said A Whiting to a Snail
Lyrics by Lewis Carroll and Don Black
Music by John Barry
Performed by Michael Hordern and Spike Milligan

They Told Me (Evidence Read at the Trial of the Knave of Hearts)
Lyrics by Lewis Carroll and Don Black
Music by John Barry
Performed by Michael Crawford

== Reception ==
=== Box office ===
The film was one of the most popular movies of the year at the British box office in 1973. Despite this the credits of director William Sterling end with the movie.

== Accolades ==
Award	Category	Nominee(s)	Result	Ref.
British Academy Film Awards	Best Cinematography	Geoffrey Unsworth (also for Cabaret)	Won	
British Academy Film Awards	Best Costume Design	Anthony Mendleson (also for Macbeth and Young Winston)	Won	

== Home media ==
The film has been released on VHS and DVD several times.
