= Anthony Mendleson =

British costume designer (1915–1996)

Anthony Mendleson (7 February 1915 – 5 September 1996) was a British costume designer. He was particularly known for creating the costumes for Ealing Studios in the 1940s and 1950s, and for Pinewood Studios in the 1960s and 1970s. His film credits include Kind Hearts and Coronets (1949), The Lavender Hill Mob (1951), The Ladykillers (1955), The Yellow Rolls-Royce (1964), Thunderball (1965), Oh! What a Lovely War (1969), Macbeth (1971), Young Winston (1972), Alice's Adventures in Wonderland (1972), The Incredible Sarah (1976), and The Boys from Brazil (1978). He received two BAFTA Awards, in addition to nominations for two Academy Awards.

Mendleson was born on 7 February 1915 in Chiswick, London; he died in London on 5 September 1996.

== Filmography ==
=== Film ===
Year	Title	Director	Notes
1949	Passport to Pimlico	Henry Cornelius	
1949	Kind Hearts and Coronets	Robert Hamer	
1949	Train of Events	Sidney Cole; Charles Crichton; Basil Dearden	
1949	A Run for Your Money	Charles Frend	
1950	The Blue Lamp	Basil Dearden	
1950	Cage of Gold	Basil Dearden	
1950	The Magnet	Charles Frend	
1951	Pool of London	Basil Dearden	
1951	The Lavender Hill Mob	Charles Crichton	
1951	The Man in the White Suit	Alexander Mackendrick	
1952	His Excellency	Robert Hamer	
1952	Secret People	Thorold Dickinson	
1952	I Believe in You	Basil Dearden; Michael Relph	
1952	Mandy	Alexander Mackendrick	
1952	The Gentle Gunman	Basil Dearden	
1953	Meet Mr. Lucifer	Anthony Pelissier	
1954	The Love Lottery	Charles Crichton	
1955	The Ladykillers	Alexander Mackendrick	
1956	Who Done It?	Basil Dearden	
1956	The Feminine Touch	Pat Jackson	
1957	True as a Turtle	Wendy Toye	
1957	Fortune Is a Woman	Sidney Gilliat	
1957	The Smallest Show on Earth	Basil Dearden	
1957	The One That Got Away	Roy Ward Baker	
1958	Chase a Crooked Shadow	Michael Anderson	
1958	Innocent Sinners	Philip Leacock	
1958	Bachelor of Hearts	Wolf Rilla	
1959	Left Right and Centre	Sidney Gilliat	
1959	The Mouse That Roared	Jack Arnold	
1959	Follow a Star	Robert Asher	
1960	Make Mine Mink	Robert Asher	
1960	The Bulldog Breed	Robert Asher	
1961	Mr. Topaze	Peter Sellers	
1961	A Matter of WHO	Don Chaffey	
1962	She'll Have to Go	Robert Asher	
1962	Guns of Darkness	Anthony Asquith	
1962	Billy Budd	Peter Ustinov	
1963	The Mouse on the Moon	Richard Lester	
1963	The Man Who Finally Died	Quentin Lawrence	
1964	The Long Ships	Jack Cardiff	
1964	The Moon-Spinners	James Neilson	
1964	The Yellow Rolls-Royce	Anthony Asquith	
1965	Thunderball	Terence Young	
1966	The Fighting Prince of Donegal	Michael O'Herlihy	
1967	Pretty Polly	Guy Green	
1968	The Magus	Guy Green	
1969	Oh! What a Lovely War	Richard Attenborough	
1969	David Copperfield	Delbert Mann	
1970	Jane Eyre	Delbert Mann	
1971	Macbeth	Roman Polanski	
1972	Young Winston	Richard Attenborough	
1972	Alice's Adventures in Wonderland	William Sterling	
1974	The Black Windmill	Don Siegel	
1974	Persecution	Don Chaffey	
1975	The Ghoul	Freddie Francis	
1975	One of Our Dinosaurs Is Missing	Robert Stevenson	
1975	Mister Quilp	Michael Tuchner	
1976	The Incredible Sarah	Richard Fleischer	
1977	Gulliver's Travels	Peter R. Hunt	
1977	A Bridge Too Far	Richard Attenborough	
1978	The Boys from Brazil	Franklin J. Schaffner	
1978	The First Great Train Robbery	Michael Crichton	
1980	Saturn 3	Stanley Donen	
1980	Rough Cut	Don Siegel	
1981	Dragonslayer	Matthew Robbins	
1983	Krull	Peter Yates	
1983	The Keep	Michael Mann	

=== Television ===
Year	Title	Notes
1984	The Last Days of Pompeii	3 episodes
1984	The Masks of Death	Television film
1985	Reunion at Fairborough	Television film
1985	Lime Street	Episode: "The Wayward Train"

== Awards and nominations ==
Award	Year (Note: Indicates the year of ceremony. Each year is linked to the article about the awards held that year, wherever possible.)	Category	Work	Result	Ref.
Academy Awards	1973	Best Costume Design	Young Winston	Nominated	
Academy Awards	1977	Best Costume Design	The Incredible Sarah	Nominated	
British Academy Film Awards	1965	Best British Costume Design – Colour	The Long Ships	Nominated	
British Academy Film Awards	1965	Best British Costume Design – Colour	The Yellow Rolls-Royce	Nominated	
British Academy Film Awards	1970	Best Costume Design	Oh! What a Lovely War	Won	
British Academy Film Awards	1973	Best Costume Design	Alice's Adventures in Wonderland / Macbeth / Young Winston	Won (Note: According to the BAFTAs database, Mendleson received a single joint award for three different films.)	
Saturn Awards	1982	Best Costume Design	Dragonslayer	Nominated	
Saturn Awards	1984	Best Costume Design	Krull	Nominated	
