= Norman Rockwell's World... An American Dream =

1972 film

- Directed by: Robert Deubel
- Written by: Gaby Monet
- Produced by: Richard Barclay
- Starring: Norman Rockwell
- Narrated by: Norman Rockwell
- Cinematography: Bob Bailin; Carroll Ballard; Sal Guida
- Edited by: Burt Rashby
- Music by: Patrick Fox
- Distributed by: Columbia Pictures
- Release date: June 1972
- Running time: 25 minutes
- Country: United States
- Language: English

Norman Rockwell's World... An American Dream is a 1972 short documentary film about artist Norman Rockwell produced by Richard Barclay and directed by Robert Deubel. The film won an Oscar at the 45th Academy Awards, held in 1973, for Best Short Subject. Barclay, being the producer, was the recipient of the Oscar.

== Summary ==
With commentary by Rockwell himself, it examines the vision and essence of the artist through still photos, archival film footage and paintings to capture the hopes, dreams and minimalism of the American people.

== Cast ==
- Norman Rockwell
- Robert Deubel
- Gaby Monet

== See also ==
- Americana
- 1972 in film
