= William Hutchinson (art director) =

American set decorator

- Born: William Ronald Hutchinson; 14 August 1901; Skipton, Yorkshire
- Occupation: Art director
- Years active: 1937–1976

William Ronald Hutchinson (born 14 August 1901), also known as William Haines, was a British art director. He was nominated for an Academy Award in the category Best Art Direction for the film Young Winston.

== Selected filmography ==
- The Dirty Dozen (1967)
- Young Winston (1972)
