= K-Z =

1972 film

- Directed by: Giorgio Treves
- Produced by: Giorgio Treves
- Production company: Nexus Film
- Release date: 1972
- Country: Italy
- Language: Italian

K-Z is a 1972 Italian short documentary film directed by Giorgio Treves. It was nominated for an Academy Award for Best Documentary Short.
