= Oh! What a Lovely War =

1969 British musical film by Richard Attenborough

- Theatrical release poster
- Directed by: Richard Attenborough
- Written by: Len Deighton
- Based on: Oh, What a Lovely War! by Joan Littlewood
- Produced by: Len Deighton; Brian Duffy
- Starring: Maggie Smith; Dirk Bogarde; Phyllis Calvert; Jean Pierre Cassel; John Clements; John Gielgud; Jack Hawkins; Kenneth More; Laurence Olivier; Michael Redgrave; Vanessa Redgrave; Ralph Richardson; Susannah York; John Mills
- Cinematography: Gerry Turpin
- Edited by: Kevin Connor
- Production company: Accord Productions
- Distributed by: Paramount Pictures
- Release dates: 10 April 1969 (London, premiere); 11 April 1969 (UK)
- Running time: 144 minutes
- Country: United Kingdom
- Language: English

Oh! What a Lovely War is a 1969 British satirical war jukebox musical film directed by Richard Attenborough (in his feature directorial debut), adapted by producer Len Deighton from the stage musical by Joan Littlewood. The film uses contemporary songs and allegorical settings to criticise the conduct of the First World War, and the title is title is derived from the eponymous music hall song, which is one of the major numbers in the film.

The film stars a large ensemble cast with numerous well-known actors and performers, some of whom only appear in cameos. The cast features Maggie Smith, Dirk Bogarde, John Gielgud, John Mills, Kenneth More, Laurence Olivier, Jack Hawkins, Corin Redgrave, Michael Redgrave, Vanessa Redgrave, Ralph Richardson, Ian Holm, Paul Shelley, Malcolm McFee, Jean-Pierre Cassel, Nanette Newman, Edward Fox, Susannah York, John Clements, Phyllis Calvert and Maurice Roëves.

Oh! What a Lovely War was released by Paramount Pictures on 10 April 1969, and received generally positive reviews. At the 23rd British Academy Film Awards, the film won in six categories, including Best Actor in a Supporting Role for Olivier and Best Soundtrack. Attenborough was nominated for both Best Direction and Best Film.

== Plot ==
The diplomatic manoeuvring and events involving those in authority are set in a fantasy location inside the pierhead pavilion. Foreign ministers, generals and heads of state walk over a huge map of Europe, restating their notable quotes. A photographer takes a picture of Europe's rulers – after handing two red poppies to the Archduke Ferdinand and his wife, the Duchess of Hohenberg, he takes their picture, "assassinating" them. Many of the heads of state enjoy good personal relations and are reluctant to go to war: a tearful Emperor Franz Josef declares war on Serbia after being deceived by his foreign minister, and Tsar Nicholas II and Kaiser Wilhelm II are shown as unable to overrule their countries' military mobilisation schedules. The German invasion of Belgium compels Sir Edward Grey to unwillingly get involved. Italy reneges on its alliance with the Central Powers, but Turkey joins them instead.

An archetypal British family of the time, the Smiths, is shown entering Brighton's West Pier to purchase tickets from General Haig. The film follows the young Smith men through their experiences in the trenches. A military band rouses holidaymakers from the beach to rally round and follow – some even literally boarding a bandwagon. The first Battle of Mons takes place.

When British casualties start to mount, a theatre audience is rallied by singing "Are We Downhearted? No!" A brightly coloured chorus line recruits a volunteer army with "We don't want to lose you, but we think you ought to go". A music hall star enters a lone spotlight and lures the doubtful young men in the audience into recruitment through song. The young men pass over the stage into military life, and the music hall singer is revealed to be a coarse, over-made-up harridan. The red poppy reappears, often handed to a soldier being sent to die. Inside the pavilion, now housing the top military brass, a scoreboard shows the loss of life and "yards gained". Outside, Sylvia Pankhurst addresses a hostile crowd on the futility of war who remains unreceptive to her upbraiding for believing everything printed in the newspapers.

The second year of the war contrasts darkly. Wounded men parade past with grim faces. Black humour has replaced the enthusiasm of 1914. During "There's a Long, Long Trail a-Winding" soldiers march in torrential rain, the only bright colour being the red poppies. British soldiers drink in an estaminet as a Soubrette leads them in a jolly chorus of "The Moon Shines Bright on Charlie Chaplin" then shifts more darkly to the sombre "Adieu la vie". At the end of the year, amidst manoeuvres in the pavilion, Douglas Haig replaces Sir John French as Commander-in-Chief of the British forces in France. Haig is mocked by Australian troops while he inspects British soldiers with the song "They were only playing Leapfrog".

At an interfaith religious service in a ruined abbey, soldiers are told each religion has endorsed the war: Jewish soldiers are permitted to eat pork if Jewish, Catholics have dispensation for meat on Fridays, and all religions have put the sabbath in abeyance. Even the Dalai Lama has blessed the war effort.

1916 passes ("The Bells of Hell Go Ting-a-ling-a-ling", "If the Sergeant Steals Your Rum, Never Mind" and "Hanging on the Old Barbed Wire"). The wounded are laid out in ranks at a dressing station.

The Americans arrive as a "disconnected reality" of the pavilion, interrupting the deliberations of the British generals by singing "Over There" in a reprise. The resolute-looking American captain seizes the map from an astonished Haig.

Jack notices with disgust that after three years of fighting, he is back where he started, at Mons. As the Armistice is sounding, Jack is the last one to die. A splash of red, at first glance blood, comes into focus as a poppy. Jack's spirit wanders the battlefield, first into the room where the elder statesmen of Europe are drafting the coming peace, oblivious to his presence, and finally on a tranquil hillside, where he lies with his brothers on the grass before their figures morph into crosses. The film closes showing a giant cemetery with countless soldiers' graves. The voices of the dead sing "We'll Never Tell Them".

== Cast (in credits order) ==
=== Smith family ===
- Wendy Allnutt as Flo Smith
- Colin Farrell as Harry Smith
- Malcolm McFee as Freddie Smith
- John Rae as Grandpa Smith
- Corin Redgrave as Bertie Smith
- Maurice Roëves as George Smith
- Paul Shelley as Jack Smith
- Kim Smith as Dickie Smith
- Angela Thorne as Betty Smith
- Mary Wimbush as Mary Smith

At the time, the Beatles were interested in making an anti-war film. At Bertrand Russell's suggestion, Paul McCartney met with the producer Len Deighton to discuss the opportunity of the band portraying the Smith family, although in the end it was not possible to arrange their appearance.

=== Also starring ===
- Vincent Ball as Australian Soldier
- Pia Colombo as Estaminet Singer
- Paul Daneman as Tsar Nicholas II
- Isabel Dean as Sir John French's Lady
- Christian Doermer as Fritz
- Robert Flemyng as Staff Officer in Gassed Trench
- Meriel Forbes as Lady Grey
- Frank Forsyth as Woodrow Wilson
- Ian Holm as President Poincaré
- David Lodge as Recruiting Sergeant
- Joe Melia as the Photographer
- Guy Middleton as Sir William Robertson
- Juliet Mills as Nurse
- Nanette Newman as Nurse
- Cecil Parker as Sir John
- Natasha Parry as Sir William Robertson's Lady
- Gerald Sim as Chaplain
- Thorley Walters as Staff Officer in Ballroom
- Anthony Ainley as Third Aide
- Michael Bates as Drunk Lance Corporal
- Fanny Carby as Mill Girl
- Geoffrey Davies as Aide
- Edward Fox as Aide
- Zeph Gladstone as Chauffeur (uncredited)
- Peter Gilmore as Private Burgess
- Norman Jones as Scottish Soldier
- Paddy Joyce as Irish Soldier
- Angus Lennie as Scottish Soldier
- Harry Locke as Heckler
- Clifford Mollison as Heckler
- Derek Newark as Shooting Gallery Proprietor
- Ron Pember as Corporal at Station
- Dorothy Reynolds as Heckler
- Norman Shelley as Staff Officer in Ballroom
- Marianne Stone as Mill Girl
- Penelope Allen as Solo Chorus Girl
- Carole Gray as Chorus Girl
- Jane Seymour as Chorus Girl (uncredited and film debut)

=== Guest stars ===
- Dirk Bogarde as Stephen
- Phyllis Calvert as Lady Haig
- Jean-Pierre Cassel as French Colonel
- John Clements as General von Moltke
- John Gielgud as Count Leopold Berchtold
- Jack Hawkins as Emperor Franz Josef I
- Kenneth More as Kaiser Wilhelm II
- Laurence Olivier as Field Marshal Sir John French
- Michael Redgrave as Sir Henry Wilson
- Vanessa Redgrave as Sylvia Pankhurst
- Ralph Richardson as Sir Edward Grey
- Maggie Smith as Music Hall Star
- Susannah York as Eleanor
- John Mills as General (later Field Marshal) Sir Douglas Haig

== Production ==
The film is based on the eponymous stage musical, originated by Charles Chilton as the radio play The Long Long Trail in December 1961, and transferred to stage by Gerry Raffles in partnership with Joan Littlewood and her Theatre Workshop in 1963.

The producers were the novelist Len Deighton, photographer Brian Duffy and Richard Attenborough, who was making his directorial debut. The Deighton Duffy production company had produced the film adaptation of Deighton's Only When I Larf starring Richard Attenborough. Deighton wrote the screenplay for Oh! What a Lovely War and the opening title sequence was created by Len Deighton's lifelong friend Raymond Hawkey, the designer responsible for many of Deighton's book covers in the 1960s. In an attempt to shame other people who he thought were claiming credit for things they hadn't actually done, Deighton decided not to be listed in the film credits, a gesture he later described as "stupid and infantile".

The 1969 film transferred the mise-en-scène completely into the cinematic domain, with elaborate sequences shot at West Pier in Brighton, elsewhere in Brighton and on the South Downs, interspersed with motifs from the stage production. These included the 'cricket' scoreboards showing the number of dead, but Deighton did not use the pierrot costumes. However, as many critics, including Pauline Kael, noted, the treatment diminished the effect of the numbers of deaths, which appear only fleetingly. Nonetheless, Deighton's final sequence, ending in a helicopter shot of thousands of war graves is regarded as one of the most memorable moments of the film. According to Attenborough, 16,000 white crosses had to be hammered into individually dug holes due to the hardness of the soil. Although this is effective in symbolising the scale of death, the number of crosses was in fact fewer than the number of deaths in a single battle: depicting the actual number killed in the entire war would have required the scale to have been replicated more than 1000 times.

The film was shot in the summer of 1968 in Sussex, mostly in the Brighton area. Many of the extras were local people, but a great many were students from the University of Sussex, Falmer, on the outskirts of the town. The film's locations included the West Pier (now gutted by fire and wrecked), Ditchling Beacon, Sheepcote Valley (the trench sequences), Old Bayham Abbey, near Frant (the church parade), Brighton station and Ovingdean (where thousands of crosses were erected for the classic finale).

=== The song ===
The song was written by J. P. Long and Maurice Scott in 1917 and was part of the repertoire of music hall star and male impersonator Ella Shields. The first verse and the chorus follow:

Up to your waist in water,
Up to your eyes in slush –
Using the kind of language,
That makes the sergeant blush;
Who wouldn't join the army?
That's what we all inquire,
Don't we pity the poor civilians sitting beside the fire.

Chorus:
Oh! Oh! Oh! it's a lovely war,
Who wouldn't be a soldier eh?
Oh! It's a shame to take the pay.
As soon as reveille is gone
We feel just as heavy as lead,
But we never get up till the sergeant brings
Our breakfast up to bed
Oh! Oh! Oh! it's a lovely war,
What do we want with eggs and ham
When we've got plum and apple jam?
Form fours! Right turn!
How shall we spend the money we earn?
Oh! Oh! Oh! it's a lovely war.

Two pre-musical renditions, one from 1918, can be found at Firstworldwar.com. Almost all of the songs featured in the film also appear on the CD41 album series Oh! It's a Lovely War (four volumes).

== Release ==
The film had its premiere at the Paramount Theatre on Piccadilly Circus in London on 10 April 1969 before opening to the public the following day.

== Reception ==
=== Box office ===
It ranked the 16th film at the UK box office in 1969.

=== Critical response ===
Variety called the film "dedicated, exhilarating, shrewd, mocking, funny, emotional, witty, poignant and technically brilliant." Roger Ebert of the Chicago Sun Times gave the film 4 stars out of 4, writing that it was not a movie but "an elaborately staged tableau, a dazzling use of the camera to achieve essentially theatrical effects. And judged on that basis, Richard Attenborough has given us a breathtaking evening." Gene Siskel of the Chicago Tribune also gave the film a perfect grade of 4 stars and wrote it "deserves an Academy Award nomination for the best picture of the year ... You can sit back and enjoy this film on any one of many levels. The songs are good, the lyrics are biting; the staging and costuming blend with the story rather than overshadow it. The acting seems effortless." Kevin Thomas of the Los Angeles Times wrote: "What noted British actor Richard Attenborough, in a dazzling directorial debut, and his principal writers Len Deighton and Brian Duffy have done is to transform the highly political and one-dimensional Joan Littlewood theatre piece into timeless—and painfully timely—tragic allegory."

Conversley, Vincent Canby of The New York Times called it "a big, elaborate, sometimes realistic film whose elephantine physical proportions and often brilliant all-star cast simply overwhelm the material with a surfeit of good intentions." Canby also included the movie in his list of "ten worst films of 1969" for the paper: "Not the year's most expensive musical, but it seems to be the biggest, the longest, the most all-star-casted—and the most stylistically confused….The movie should be seen in conjunction with 'Battle of Britain,' which uses many of the same actors and is just as reverent of British caste as 'Lovely War' is irreverent." Gary Arnold of The Washington Post wrote: "The conception is intriguing, but the film turns into an infernal, precision machine. As one big production number succeeded the other and one perfectly measured and symmetrical tableau faded into the next, I began to feel stupefied rather than touched. The physical production was rolling over the songs, the characters and the vignettes." David Wilson of The Monthly Film Bulletin wrote that "one is simply left admiring a worthy mosaic of bits and pieces, full of good ideas but nowhere near to being a self-contained dramatic entity."

The film presently has a score of 75% on Rotten Tomatoes based on 16 reviews, with an average grade of 8.2 out of 10.

The Toronto Star received complaints from veteran organizations about the advertisement for the film that featured cemetery crosses and later ran the adverts without the image.

=== Accolades ===
Award	Category	Nominee(s)	Result	Ref.
British Academy Film Awards	Best Film	Richard Attenborough	Nominated	
British Academy Film Awards	Best Direction	Richard Attenborough	Nominated	
British Academy Film Awards	Best Actor in a Supporting Role	Laurence Olivier	Won	
British Academy Film Awards	Best Actress in a Supporting Role	Mary Wimbush	Nominated	
British Academy Film Awards	Best Art Direction	Donald M. Ashton	Won	
British Academy Film Awards	Best Cinematography	Gerry Turpin	Won	
British Academy Film Awards	Best Costume Design	Anthony Mendleson	Won	
British Academy Film Awards	Best Editing	Kevin Connor	Nominated	
British Academy Film Awards	Best Soundtrack	Don Challis and Simon Kaye	Won	
British Academy Film Awards	United Nations Award	Richard Attenborough	Won	
British Society of Cinematographers Awards	Best Cinematography in a Theatrical Feature Film	Gerry Turpin	Won	
Directors Guild of America Awards	Outstanding Directorial Achievement in Motion Pictures	Richard Attenborough	Nominated	
Golden Globe Awards	Best English-Language Foreign Film		Won	
Mar del Plata International Film Festival	Best Feature Film	Richard Attenborough	Nominated	
New York Film Critics Circle Awards	Best Film		Runner-up	
New York Film Critics Circle Awards	Best Director	Richard Attenborough	Runner-up	

== References in popular culture ==
- English rock band Colonel Bagshot released an anti-war album of the same name in 1971, their first and only LP.
- BBC Radio 4's 15 Minute Musical portrayed Tony Blair's premiership in the style of Oh! What a Lovely War in a September 2006 episode entitled "Oh! What a Lovely Blair".
- At a Google Talks event, James Rado, one of the original writers and creators of Hair, stated that Oh! What a Lovely War was what made him want to work on a musical dealing with war. Archived at Ghostarchive and the Wayback Machine: "@Google: The Public Theatre's Revival of Hair". 22 August 2008 – via YouTube.
- The song "The Bells of Hell Go Ting-a-ling-a-ling" was used as the play-out music for Ned Sherrin's 1964 BBC-TV show Not So Much a Programme, More a Way of Life.
- Babyshambles named their live album Oh! What a Lovely Tour after this film.
