= Sylvan Barnet =

American Shakespeare scholar

- Born: December 11, 1926; Brooklyn, New York, US
- Died: January 11, 2016 (aged 89); Cambridge, Massachusetts, US

Academic background
- Education: New York University; Harvard University

Academic work
- Discipline: Shakespeare scholar
- Notable works: Signet Classics Shakespeare; A Short Guide to Shakespeare

Sylvan Saul Barnet (December 11, 1926 – January 11, 2016) was an American literary critic and Shakespearean scholar. He was a Fletcher Professor of English Emeritus at Tufts University and the general editor of the Signet Classics Shakespeare.

== Biography ==
Barnet was born in Brooklyn, New York, and attended Erasmus Hall High School. His father was a leather tanner. Barnet served in the U.S. Army at the tail end of World War II. He earned his bachelor's degree at New York University in 1948, and then his M.A. in 1950 and Ph.D. in 1954 at Harvard University. In 1951, Barnet met William C. Burto. The two became life partners in 1952.

Barnet spent his entire career at Tufts University, where he taught English literature from 1954 to 1984 and served for several terms as chair of the English department. He was the first Jewish member of the department.

Barnet authored numerous books and articles on William Shakespeare, including A Short Guide to Shakespeare. In the early 1960s, Barnet successfully proposed to the New American Library the creation of a new series of Shakespeare's plays, one that would be aimed at college students. Each low-cost volume in the Signet Classics Shakespeare series focused on a single play. Every book included a general essay by Barnet about Shakespeare's life and times, an introductory essay about the specific play by an eminent scholar, and excerpts of some of Shakespeare's sources and inspirations.

Barnet was the co-author (with Burto) of essays on aspects of Japanese art. Their writings on art drew inspiration from the couple's impressive personal collection, which was donated to four different museums after their deaths. Barnet also wrote several textbooks about art, writing, and literature. In total, Barnet wrote, co-wrote, or edited over forty books during his lifetime.

Barnet lived in Cambridge, Massachusetts, with Burto until the latter's death in 2013. Barnet died of brain cancer at his home on January 11, 2016, at the age of 89.

== Selected works ==
- Eight Great Tragedies, with William Burto and Morton Berman, Penguin Group (USA), 1996, ISBN 978-0-452-01172-4
- A Short Guide to Shakespeare, An Original Harvest Book, New York, 1972, ISBN 0-15-681800-0
- Short Guide to Writing about Literature, with William E. Cain, Longman, Boston, 12th ed, 2012, ISBN 0-205-11845-3
- The Written Image: Japanese Calligraphy and Painting from the Sylvan Barnet and William Burto collection, with by Miyeko Murase and the Metropolitan Museum of Art, Yale University Press, New Haven, 2002, ISBN 0-300-09689-5
- A Short Guide to Writing about Art, Addison-Wesley Educational Publishers, 10th ed, 2011, ISBN 0-673-39195-7
- Shakespeare's Merchant of Venice: A Collection of Critical Essays, Prentice Hall, June 1970, ISBN 0-13-577155-2
- An Introduction to Literature, with William Burto and William E. Cain, Longman, 16th ed, 2010, ISBN 0-205-63309-9
- Types of Drama: Plays and Contexts, with William C. Burto, Lesley Ferris, and Gerald Rabkin, Longman, 2001, ISBN 0-321-06506-9
- Zen Ink Paintings (Great Japanese Art), with William Burto, Kodansha Amer Inc, October 1982, ISBN 0-87011-521-9
- Current Issues and Enduring Questions: A Guide to Critical Thinking and Argument, with Readings, with Hugo Bedau, Bedford/St. Martin's, July 2010, ISBN 0-312-54732-3
