= Anna Hill Johnstone =

American costume designer (1913–1992)

- Born: April 7, 1913; Greenville, South Carolina, U.S.
- Died: October 16, 1992 (aged 79); Lenox, Massachusetts, U.S.
- Other names: Anna Johnstone Robinson
- Occupation: Costume designer
- Spouse: Curville Jones Robinson (m. 1937; died 1989)

Anna Hill Johnstone (April 7, 1913 – October 16, 1992) was an American costume designer. Known for her collaborations with directors Elia Kazan, Sidney Lumet and Frank Perry, she received two Academy Award nominations for her work on The Godfather (1972) and Ragtime (1981).

Johnstone's credits include East of Eden (1955), Baby Doll (1956), David and Lisa (1962), The Group (1966), The Godfather (1972), The Taking of Pelham One Two Three (1974), The Stepford Wives (1975), Dog Day Afternoon (1975), and Running on Empty (1988).

== Early life ==
Johnstone was born in Greenville, South Carolina, and grew up in Richmond, Virginia. She studied at St. Catherine's School. In 1934, she graduated from Barnard College.

== Career ==
Johnstone got her start working on student productions at Barnard College, later becoming a seamstress for summer stock stage shows. Her first full credit for costume design was for the 1937 Broadway hit Having Wonderful Time. Her other stage productions included Bell, Book and Candle, Tea and Sympathy, and A Streetcar Named Desire.

In 1948, Johnstone made the move to working in films, obtaining her first costume design credit on Portrait of Jennie. She has been nominated for an Oscar twice for her work in costume design.

== Personal life ==
Johnstone was married to mechanical engineer Curville Jones Robinson from 1937 until his death in 1989.

== Death ==
Johnstone died on October 19, 1992, in a nursing home in Lenox, Massachusetts, after a long illness. She was 79 years old.

== Selected filmography ==
Title	Year	Director	Notes
Portrait of Jennie	1948	William Dieterle	Assistant Costume Designer
On the Waterfront	1954	Elia Kazan	Wardrobe Supervisor
East of Eden	1955	Elia Kazan	Wardrobe Designed by
Baby Doll	1956	Elia Kazan	Wardrobe Designed by
A Face in the Crowd	1957	Elia Kazan	Costume Designer
Splendor in the Grass	1961	Elia Kazan	Costume Designer
David and Lisa	1961	Frank Perry	Costume Designer
America America	1963	Elia Kazan	Costume Designer
Ladybug, Ladybug	1963	Frank Perry	Costume Designer
Fail Safe	1964	Sidney Lumet	Costume Designer
Frankenstein Meets the Spacemonster	1965	Robert Gaffney	Costume Designer
A Christmas Memory	1966	Frank Perry	Costume Designer
The Swimmer	1968	Frank Perry	Costume Designer
Alice's Restaurant	1969	Arthur Penn	Costume Designer
The Godfather	1972	Francis Ford Coppola	Costume Designer
Serpico	1973	Sidney Lumet	Costume Designer
The Taking of Pelham One Two Three	1974	Joseph Sargent	Costume Designer
The Stepford Wives	1975	Bryan Forbes	Costume Designer
Dog Day Afternoon	1975	Sidney Lumet	Costume Designer
The Last Tycoon	1976	Elia Kazan	Costume Designer
The Wiz	1978	Sidney Lumet	Costume Coordinator
King of the Gypsies	1978	Frank Pierson	Costume Designer
Ragtime	1981	Miloš Forman	Costume Designer
The Verdict	1982	Sidney Lumet	Costume Designer
Garbo Talks	1984	Sidney Lumet	Costume Designer
Running on Empty	1988	Sidney Lumet	Costume Designer

== Awards and nominations ==
Institution	Category	Year	Work	Result
Academy Awards	Best Costume Design	1973	The Godfather	Nominated
Academy Awards	Best Costume Design	1982	Ragtime	Nominated
BAFTA Awards	Best Costume Design	1973	The Godfather	Nominated
Costume Designers Guild Awards	Hall of Fame	2006	—N/a	Won
