= Peter James (set decorator) =

English set decorator

- Born: 14 April 1924
- Died: 17 November 1997 (aged 73); Dover, Kent, England
- Occupation: Set decorator
- Years active: 1950-1998

Peter James (14 April 1924 – 17 November 1997) was an English set decorator. He was nominated for two Academy Awards in the category Best Art Direction.

== Selected filmography ==
James was nominated for two Academy Awards for Best Art Direction:

- Young Winston (1972)
- The Man Who Would Be King (1975)
