= 35th Sikhs =

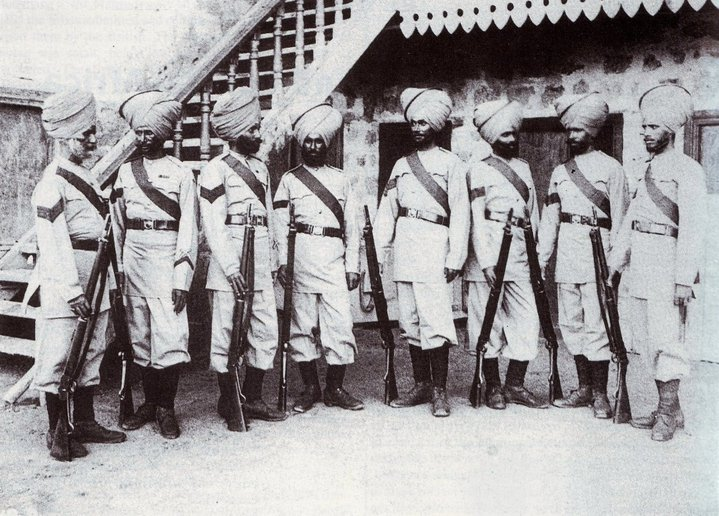
- Havildars of the 35th Sikhs in the Sudan 1896.
- Active: 1887-1922
- Country: Indian Empire
- Branch: Army
- Type: Infantry
- Part of: Bengal Army (to 1895); Bengal Command
- Uniform: Red; faced yellow
- Engagements: Siege of Malakand; World War I Third Afghan War

The 35th Sikhs were an infantry regiment of the British Indian Army. They could trace their origins to 1887, when they were raised as the 35th (Sikh) Bengal Infantry.

The regiment took part in the Siege of Malakand in 1897 and World War I. During World War I the regiment was part of the 2nd (Rawalpindi) Division stationed on the North West Frontier dealing with numerous incursions by Afghan tribes. In 1919, they took part in the Third Afghan War.

After World War I the Indian government reformed the army moving from single battalion regiments to multi battalion regiments. In 1922, the 35th Sikhs now became the 10th Training Battalion, 11th Sikh Regiment. The regiment was allocated to the new Indian Army on independence.

== Predecessor names ==
- 35th (Sikh) Bengal Infantry - 1887
- 35th Sikh Infantry - 1901
- 35th Sikhs - 1903
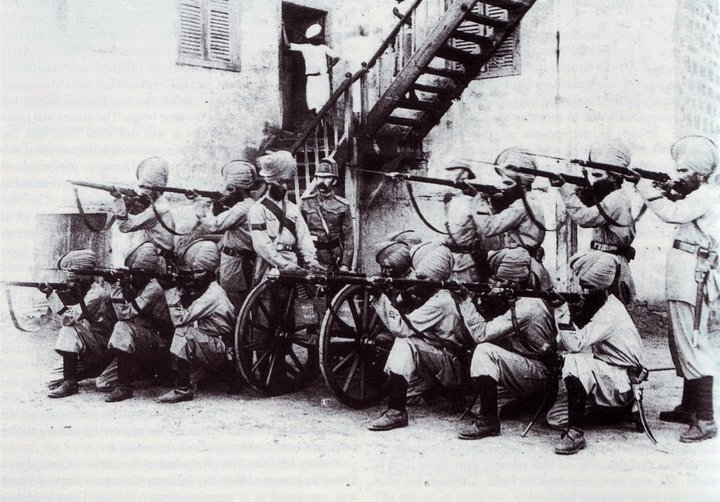
35th Sikhs in the Soudan in 1896 with a Maxim gun

== Sources ==
- Barthorp, Michael; Burn, Jeffrey (1979). Indian infantry regiments 1860-1914. Osprey Publishing. ISBN 0-85045-307-0.
- Sumner, Ian (2001). The Indian Army 1914-1947. Osprey Publishing. ISBN 1-84176-196-6.
