= Geoffrey Drake =

English production designer and art director (1911–1995)

- Born: 1911
- Died: 1995 (aged 83–84)
- Occupations: Production designer Art director
- Years active: 1949-1981

Geoffrey Drake (1911–1995) was an English production designer and art director. He was nominated for an Academy Award in the category Best Art Direction for the film Young Winston.

== Selected filmography ==
- Young Winston (1972)
