= Donald M. Ashton =

English art director (1919–2004)

- Born: 26 June 1919; Edmonton, London, England
- Died: 25 August 2004 (aged 85); Somerset, England
- Occupation: Art director
- Years active: 1947–1972

Donald M. Ashton (26 June 1919 – 25 August 2004) was an Academy Award-nominated and BAFTA-winning English art director most noted for his work on such films as Billy Budd (1962), The Bridge on the River Kwai (1957), Oh! What a Lovely War (1969) and Young Winston (1972).

== Background ==
Born Donald Martin Ashton in Edmonton, London, in 1917, Ashton was the son of a wine buyer. He was educated at Boxlane School, Palmers Green. After training as an architect, on the outbreak of the Second World War he joined the R.A.F., serving in the Middle and Far East. During the latter part of the war he was posted to Ceylon, where he served with Lord Louis Mountbatten's unit. He joined the film industry in 1947 at the suggestion of actor and playwright, Emlyn Williams. His first job was working as an uncredited draughtsman for the Boulting brothers on their film Brighton Rock. The film starred Richard Attenborough, who was to employ Ashton many years later to design two of the films he directed. During the 1950s and 1970s Ashton acquired a reputation as one of the best production designers in the business with such works as The Bridge on the River Kwai and Young Winston. For this, his last film with Attenborough, Ashton was nominated for an Academy Award in the category for Best Art Direction.

== Second career ==
In the early 1970s Harry Saltzman, the producer of the James Bond films, was so taken with Ashton's sets that he asked him to redesign the interior of his house. It was the beginning of a new chapter in Ashton's career as a designer of hotels and restaurants, particularly in Asia. His most famous is the magnificent five-star Mandarin Oriental Hotel in Hong Kong, regarded as one of the most elegant hotels in the world. This work resulted in Ashton receiving commissions to design more Mandarin hotels and many of the Sheraton hotels being built around the world. The projects made Ashton a wealthy man, allowing him to purchase homes in Mayfair and Amersham, Buckinghamshire. He lived in Hong Kong for 20 years.

== Selected filmography ==
- The Bridge on the River Kwai (1957)
- Billy Budd (1962)
- Bunny Lake is Missing (1965)
- A Countess from Hong Kong (1967)
- The Bobo (1967)
- Oh! What a Lovely War (1969)
- Tam Lin (1970)
- Young Winston (1972)
