= 1972 New York Film Critics Circle Awards =

38th New York Film Critics Circle Awards

38th New York Film Critics Circle Awards

January 3, 1973

Best Picture:
Cries and Whispers

The 38th New York Film Critics Circle Awards, announced on 3 January 1973, honored the best filmmaking of 1972.

== Winners ==
- Best Actor:
  - Laurence Olivier - Sleuth
  - Runners-up: Marlon Brando - The Godfather and James Mason - Child's Play
- Best Actress:
  - Liv Ullmann - Cries and Whispers (Viskningar och rop) and The Emigrants (Utvandrarna)
  - Runners-up: Cicely Tyson - Sounder, Harriet Andersson - Cries and Whispers (Viskningar och rop) and Janet Suzman - A Day in the Death of Joe Egg
- Best Director:
  - Ingmar Bergman - Cries and Whispers (Viskningar och rop)
  - Runners-up: Francis Ford Coppola - The Godfather and Luis Buñuel - The Discreet Charm of the Bourgeoisie (Le charme discret de la bourgeoisie)
- Best Film:
  - Cries and Whispers (Viskningar och rop)
  - Runners-up: The Godfather and The Emigrants (Utvandrarna)
- Best Screenplay:
  - Ingmar Bergman - Cries and Whispers (Viskningar och rop)
  - Runners-up: Luis Buñuel and Jean-Claude Carrière - The Discreet Charm of the Bourgeoisie (Le charme discret de la bourgeoisie)
- Best Supporting Actor:
  - Robert Duvall - The Godfather
  - Runners-up: Eddie Albert - The Heartbreak Kid and Robert Shaw - Young Winston
- Best Supporting Actress:
  - Jeannie Berlin - The Heartbreak Kid
  - Runners-up: Susan Tyrrell - Fat City and Ida Lupino - Junior Bonner
- Special Award:
  - The Sorrow and the Pity
