= James Berkeley =

James Berkeley may refer to:

- James Berkeley (bishop) (died 1327), medieval bishop of Exeter
- James Berkeley, 1st Baron Berkeley (c. 1394–1463), "James the Just", English peer
- James Berkeley, 3rd Earl of Berkeley (aft. 1679–1736), First Lord of the Admiralty during the reign of George I
- James P. Berkeley (1907–1985), United States Marine Corps general

== See also ==
- James Barkley, artist
- James R. Barkley (1869–1948), Iowa politician
- James Barclay (disambiguation)
