= James Barclay (disambiguation) =

James Barclay (born 1965) is a British fantasy author.

James or Jim Barclay may also refer to:

- James Barclay, eighteenth century English banker, namesake of Barclays Bank
- James A. Barclay (1923–2011), Scottish Canadian oil industry scientist and executive, golfer, and golf historian
- James William Barclay (1832–1907), Scottish businessman
- Colonel James Barclay, a fictional character in "The Adventure of the Crooked Man", a Sherlock Holmes story by Arthur Conan Doyle
- James Turner Barclay (1807–1874), American missionary and explorer of Palestine
- James Barclay (priest) (died 1750), Canon of Windsor
- James Lent Barclay (1848–1925), American member of New York society during the Gilded Age
- James Barclay (minister) (1844–1920), minister of the Church of Scotland and footballer
- Jim Barclay (politician) (1882–1972), New Zealand politician
- Jim Barclay (comedian) (born 1947), English actor and comedian
- Jim Barclay (field hockey) (1933–1989), New Zealand field hockey player
- Jamie Barclay (born 1989), Scottish footballer

== See also ==
- James Barkley, American artist
- James R. Barkley (1869–1948), Iowa politician
- James Berkeley (disambiguation)
