= Sounder (film) =

1972 film by Martin Ritt

- Theatrical poster
- Directed by: Martin Ritt
- Screenplay by: Lonne Elder III
- Based on: Sounder; 1969 novel by William H. Armstrong
- Produced by: Robert B. Radnitz
- Starring: Cicely Tyson; Paul Winfield; Kevin Hooks
- Cinematography: John A. Alonzo
- Edited by: Sid Levin
- Music by: Taj Mahal
- Production company: Radnitz/Mattel Productions
- Distributed by: 20th Century Fox
- Release date: September 24, 1972
- Running time: 105 minutes
- Country: United States
- Language: English
- Budget: $1.9 million
- Box office: $16.9 million

Sounder is a 1972 American drama film directed by Martin Ritt and adapted by Lonne Elder III from the 1969 novel by William H. Armstrong. The story concerns an African-American sharecropper family in Louisiana who struggle with economic and personal hardships during the Great Depression. It stars Cicely Tyson, Paul Winfield, and Kevin Hooks. Taj Mahal composed the film's blues-inspired soundtrack, and also appears in a supporting role.

The film was both a critical and commercial success, and the National Board of Review ranked it as one of the Top 10 best films of 1972. Cicely Tyson and Paul Winfield both received Oscar nominations for their performances, and the film was nominated for Best Picture and Best Adapted Screenplay. Taj Mahal's score was nominated for a BAFTA and Grammy Award, and 13-year old Hooks earned a Golden Globe nomination for Most Promising Newcomer – Male.

In 2006, the American Film Institute ranked the film #61 on their list of the most inspiring movies of all time. In 2021, it was selected for preservation in the United States National Film Registry by the Library of Congress as being "culturally, historically, or aesthetically significant".

== Plot ==
In 1933, the Morgans are an African-American family living as sharecroppers in rural Louisiana, raising sugar cane for their white landlord. David Lee, the oldest son, is a bright boy who loves to hunt with his father, Nathan Lee, and their dog Sounder, but is only able to attend school sporadically in between helping his mother Rebecca on the farm. Nathan and David lose the raccoon they are hunting one evening, leaving the family without meat to eat, but the children awaken the next morning to the smell of ham cooking and happily eat it.

When they return home after a community baseball game, which Nathan helps his team win, they find the sheriff and his deputies waiting to arrest Nathan for stealing the ham from a nearby smokehouse. As they take him away, Sounder runs after their wagon and one of the deputies shoots him, though Nathan partially deflects the shot by kicking the gun. The injured Sounder runs away, and David cannot find him. He looks for him for days, but is unable to continue the search because with their father gone, he and his little brother and sister must help Rebecca farm and harvest the crops. Rebecca shares her faith with David that Sounder is alive and will return home eventually.

The family is restricted from visiting Nathan at the local jail while he awaits shipment to the work camp after being sentenced to a year's hard labor. Only David is allowed to visit, bringing a chocolate cake that Rebecca baked for Nathan. They enjoy a piece together despite their worries over not knowing where Nathan will be taken. Mrs. Boatwright, a sympathetic local woman who employs Rebecca to do her laundry and often gives the children books to read, promises David she will find out the location of the work camp. When the sheriff refuses to tell her, she goes through his filing cabinet to find the information. Despite the sheriff's threats, she tells the Morgan family that Nathan has been taken to the distant Wishbone prison camp, and helps Rebecca plot the route there on the map. Sounder returns home, though he does not bark like he used to, and accompanies David on a long journey on foot to the camp.

David makes it to the Wishbone camp, but is unable to find Nathan and is ignored by the guards when he inquires after him. When he tries to ask the prisoners, a guard strikes his hand with an iron rod and chases him away. On his journey home, he comes across a school with all black students, where the kind, outspoken teacher, Miss Johnson, bandages his injured hand and has him stay at her house and attend class at the school for several days before he starts for home again. One night, she shares books from her collection about important African-American historical figures with him and reads to him from the work of W.E.B. DuBois.

After returning home, David longs to attend the distant school, but has largely given up on the dream when one day Sounder runs barking like he used to, to greet the returning Nathan, who was released from the work camp early after his leg was injured in a dynamite explosion. Seeing his father's depleted strength, David resolves to stay and work the farm in his place, but after learning of the school, Nathan is adamant that David go to attend it full-time. They have a heart-to-heart about how Nathan wishes for his children to escape the dead-end life of sharecropping and aspire to better things, and the next day, Rebecca and his siblings cheerfully see David off as Nathan takes him away to attend the school, accompanied by Sounder.

== Cast ==
- Cicely Tyson as Rebecca Morgan
- Paul Winfield as Nathan Lee Morgan
- Kevin Hooks as David Lee Morgan
- Carmen Matthews as Mrs. Rita Boatwright
- Taj Mahal as Ike Phillips
- James Best as Sheriff Charlie Young
- Eric Hooks as Earl Morgan
- Yvonne Jarrell as Josie Mae Morgan
- Janet MacLachlan as Camille Johnson
- Sylvia "Kuumba" Williams as Harriet
- Ted Airhart as Mr. Perkins
- Richard Durham as Perkins' Foreman
- Jerry Leggio as Prison Guard
- Spencer Bradford as Clarence
- Judge William Thomas Bennett as Judge
- Reverend Thomas N. Phillips as Minister Garth

== Soundtrack ==
Taj Mahal recorded a soundtrack to the film, released in 1972 by Columbia Records. According to music journalist Robert Christgau, it was "the first soundtrack ever patterned after a field recording", featuring a "suite/montage/succession of hums, moans, claps, and plucked fragments", all performed in the key of the gospel blues song "Needed Time" by Lightnin' Hopkins. Fellow critic Greil Marcus regarded it as Mahal's "most eloquent music", although Christgau said "even Greil doesn't know anybody who agrees. I've always regarded field recordings as study aids myself." He gave the soundtrack album a C-plus in Christgau's Record Guide: Rock Albums of the Seventies (1981).

== Release ==
Sounder opened September 24, 1972 at the Embassy and Plaza theaters in New York City.

=== Home media ===
When the film was released on VHS, Paramount Home Video assumed distribution rights. Sterling Entertainment currently has DVD distribution rights.

== Reception ==
=== Critical reception ===
Sounder received critical acclaim, with reviewers praising it as a welcome antidote to the contemporaneous wave of films starring African-Americans, many of which were considered of low quality genre or "Blaxploitation" features. Variety wrote that the picture had been "for good or ill, singled out to test whether the black audience will respond to serious films about the black experience rather than the 'super black' exploitation features." The film's depiction of a loving family was hailed as a banner accomplishment for black filmmakers and audiences. Based on 20 reviews, Sounder holds a 90% "Fresh" score (and an average of 7.7/10) on Rotten Tomatoes.

John Simon wrote "Sounder is a rare honest movie about people who work the soil under conditions of extreme rigor. Sounder is also a rare honest Hollywood movie about blacks, making it virtually unique".

Film critic Roger Ebert of the Chicago Sun-Times gave the film four stars out of four, stating: "there's not a level where it doesn't succeed completely", and predicting Sounder would resonate with children and adults. Both Gene Siskel, of the Chicago Tribune, and Ebert placed the film on their 10-best lists of 1972.

In his Family Guide to Movies on Video, Henry Herx wrote: "Sounder captures the humanity of [its] characters and a fine, distanced sense of its sleepy Southern locale. The movie earns a deep emotional response from its audience because its [appealing] story and characters are believable. Not only a valid examination of the black experience in America, it is also a fine family experience." He added that the boy's search for his father "provides additional drama".

Some of Sounder's success was due to its innovative marketing strategy. Fox focused on group sales in major cities and targeted religious organizations and schools. Radnitz personally visited 35 cities and held over 500 screenings, with 60 simultaneous sneak previews held in New York City. Religious establishments came out in favor of the film, with an endorsement by the Catholic Film Office and a study guide for religious educators created by the National Council of Churches. The Variety article noted that Fox wrote a study guide, prepared by Dr. Roscoe Brown, Jr., director of Afro-American Affairs at New York University. 20th Century Fox spent over $1 million promoting the film, according to Variety.

=== Box office ===
Despite popular skepticism that the film would not be a financial success, the picture was a major box-office hit. The film grossed $27,045 from 2 theaters in its opening week and grossed 30% more the following week. Made for less than $1 million, it grossed just under $17 million, generating $9 million of theatrical rentals in the United States and Canada in 1973, the 10th highest-grossing film of 1972.

=== Awards and nominations ===
Award	Category	Nominee(s)	Result	Ref.
Academy Awards	Best Picture	Robert B. Radnitz	Nominated	
Academy Awards	Best Actor	Paul Winfield	Nominated	
Academy Awards	Best Actress	Cicely Tyson	Nominated	
Academy Awards	Best Screenplay – Based on Material from Another Medium	Lonne Elder III	Nominated	
British Academy Film Awards	Best Original Music	Taj Mahal	Nominated	
British Academy Film Awards	United Nations Award	Martin Ritt	Nominated	
Directors Guild of America Awards	Outstanding Directorial Achievement in Motion Pictures	Martin Ritt	Nominated	
Golden Globe Awards	Best Actress in a Motion Picture – Drama	Cicely Tyson	Nominated	
Golden Globe Awards	Most Promising Newcomer – Male	Kevin Hooks	Nominated	
Grammy Awards	Best Album of Best Original Score Written for a Motion Picture or a Television Special	Taj Mahal	Nominated	
Kansas City Film Critics Circle Awards	Best Actress	Cicely Tyson	Won (Note: Tied with Katharine Hepburn for The Trojan Women.)	
National Board of Review Awards	Top Ten Films		4th Place	
National Board of Review Awards	Best Actress	Cicely Tyson	Won	
National Society of Film Critics Awards	Best Actress	Cicely Tyson	Won	
New York Film Critics Circle Awards	Best Actress	Cicely Tyson	Runner-up	
Writers Guild of America Awards	Best Drama – Adapted from Another Medium	Lonne Elder III	Nominated	

American Film Institute

- AFI's 100 Years...100 Cheers - #61

Sounder was the first film to feature Oscar-nominated performances by two black actors, with Winfield nominated for Best Actor and Tyson for Best Actress. The next film with black actors receiving nominations for Best Actor and Best Actress was What's Love Got to Do with It in 1993, with Laurence Fishburne and Angela Bassett. The third film to achieve this was Ma Rainey's Black Bottom in 2020, with Chadwick Boseman and Viola Davis.

== Sequel ==
The sequel Part 2, Sounder was released in 1976. Taj Mahal and Ted Airhart were the only returning cast members from the first film..

== Remake ==
In 2003, Wonderful World of Disney aired a new film adaptation, reuniting two actors from the original. Kevin Hooks (who played the son) directed, and Paul Winfield (who played the father) played the role of the teacher. Walt Disney Home Entertainment has released the television version on DVD..

== See also ==
- List of American films of 1972
