= Ord och Bild =

Cultural magazine in Sweden

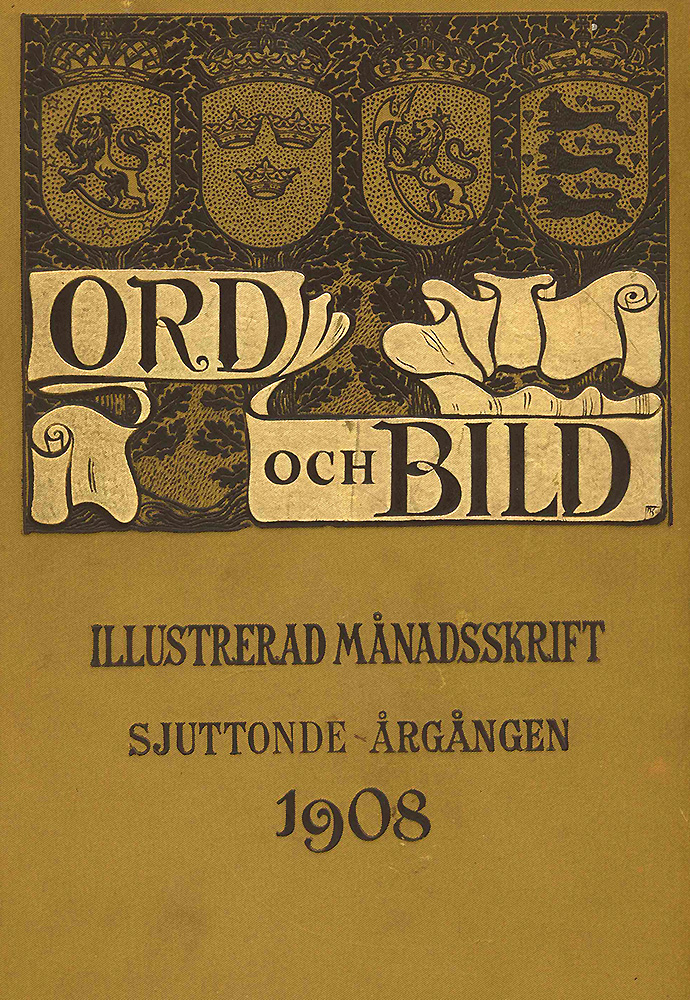
- Cover page dated 1908
- Categories: Literary magazine
- Frequency: Monthly
- Founded: 1892
- Country: Sweden
- Based in: Stockholm (1892–1986); Gothenburg
- Language: Swedish
- ISSN: 0030-4492
- OCLC: 643568237

Ord och Bild, also stylized as Ord & Bild, (Swedish: Word and Image) is a cultural and literary magazine which has been in circulation with some interruptions since 1892. The magazine is headquartered in Gothenburg, Sweden, and its subtitle is Illustrerad månadsskrift (Swedish: Illustrated monthly).

== History and profile ==
Ord och Bild was established in 1892. The founding publishing company was P. A. Norstedt & Söner based in Stockholm. In 1893 the magazine began to be published by Wahlström & Widstrand. In 1934 P. A. Norstedt & Söner became its publisher and published it until 1937. Between 1938 and 1947 Wahlström & Widstrand published Ord och Bild. In 1986 its headquarters was moved to Gothenburg.

In the 1930s Ord och Bild was one of the Swedish magazines which was read by Finnish authors and literary critics to have information on new literary tendencies in Europe and the United States. The poems by Lars Mikael Raattamaa were published in the magazine in the early 2000s.

In addition to literary work and criticism Ord och Bild features articles on other topics, including art, music, society, philosophy, and history. One such article was about the Nordic race which was written by Gunnar Dahlberg. In the article dated 1933 Dahlberg objected the concept of race employed by the Nazi figures. The magazine also published articles concerning pornography and pop music in the 1960s. During this period the magazine was directed by young leftist intellectuals. Ord och Bild features film reviews one of which was about Ingmar Bergman's Cries and Whispers.
