= 30th Golden Globe Awards =

Film award ceremony in 1973

- Date: January 28, 1973

The 30th Golden Globe Awards, honoring the best in film and television for 1972, were held on January 28, 1973.

== Background ==
Marlon Brando wished not to be nominated in any category. A survey of fifty-three countries excluding the United States found him as the most favorite actor.

== Winners and nominees ==
=== Film ===
Best Motion Picture
Drama	Comedy or Musical
The Godfather; Deliverance; Frenzy; The Poseidon Adventure; Sleuth	Cabaret; Avanti!; Butterflies Are Free; 1776; Travels with My Aunt
Best Performance in a Motion Picture – Drama
Actor	Actress
Marlon Brando – The Godfather as Vito Corleone; Michael Caine – Sleuth as Milo Tindle; Laurence Olivier – Sleuth as Andrew Wyke; Al Pacino – The Godfather as Michael Corleone; Jon Voight – Deliverance as Ed	Liv Ullmann – The Emigrants as Kristina; Diana Ross – Lady Sings the Blues as Billie Holiday; Cicely Tyson – Sounder as Rebecca Morgan; Trish Van Devere – One Is a Lonely Number as Aimee Brower; Tuesday Weld – Play It as It Lays as Maria Wyeth; Joanne Woodward – The Effect of Gamma Rays on Man-in-the-Moon Marigolds as Beatric Hunsdorfer
Best Performance in a Motion Picture – Comedy or Musical
Actor	Actress
Jack Lemmon – Avanti! as Wendell Armbruster; Edward Albert – Butterflies Are Free as Don Baker; Charles Grodin – The Heartbreak Kid as Lenny Cantrow; Walter Matthau – Pete 'n' Tillie as Pete; Peter O'Toole – Man of La Mancha as Don Quixote de la Mancha / Miguel de Cervantes	Liza Minnelli – Cabaret as Sally Bowles; Carol Burnett – Pete 'n' Tillie as Tillie; Goldie Hawn – Butterflies Are Free as Jill Tanner; Juliet Mills – Avanti! as Pamela Piggott; Maggie Smith – Travels with My Aunt as Augusta Bertram
Best Supporting Performance in a Motion Picture – Drama, Comedy or Musical
Supporting Actor	Supporting Actress
Joel Grey – Cabaret as Master of Ceremonies; James Caan – The Godfather as Sonny Corleone; James Coco – Man of La Mancha as Sancho Panza; Alec McCowen – Travels with My Aunt as Henry Pulling; Clive Revill – Avanti! as Carlo Carlucci	Shelley Winters – The Poseidon Adventure as Belle Rosen; Marisa Berenson – Cabaret as Natalia Landauer; Jeannie Berlin – The Heartbreak Kid as Lila Kolodny; Helena Kallianiotes – Kansas City Bomber as Jackie Burdette; Geraldine Page – Pete 'n' Tillie as Gertrude
Other
Best Director	Best Screenplay
Francis Ford Coppola – The Godfather; John Boorman – Deliverance; Bob Fosse – Cabaret; Alfred Hitchcock – Frenzy; Billy Wilder – Avanti!	The Godfather – Francis Ford Coppola and Mario Puzo; Avanti! – I. A. L. Diamond and Billy Wilder; Cabaret – Jay Presson Allen; Deliverance – James Dickey; Frenzy – Anthony Shaffer; The Heartbreak Kid – Neil Simon
Best Original Score	Best Original Song.
The Godfather – Nino Rota; Frenzy – Ron Goodwin; The Getaway – Quincy Jones; Lady Sings the Blues – Michel Legrand; The Poseidon Adventure – John Williams	"Ben" (Don Black, Walter Scharf) – Ben; "Carry Me" (Bob Alcivar, Randy McNeill) – Butterflies Are Free; "Dueling Banjos" (Arthur Smith, Eric Weissberg) – Deliverance; "Marmalade, Molasses and Honey" (Maurice Jarre, Alan and Marilyn Bergman) – The Life and Times of Judge Roy Bean; "Mein Herr" (John Kander, Frank Ebb) – Cabaret; "Money, Money" (John Kander, Frank Ebb) – Cabaret; "The Morning After" (Al Kasha, Joel Hirschhorn) – The Poseidon Adventure; "Take Me Home" (Johnny Mandel, Alan and Marilyn Bergman) – Molly and Lawless John
Best Foreign Film (English Language)	Best Foreign Film (Foreign Language)
Young Winston; Images; Living Free; The Ruling Class; Zee and Co.	The Emigrants (Sweden); The New Land (Sweden); Cries and Whispers (Sweden); The Discreet Charm of the Bourgeoisie (France); Mirage (Peru); Roma (Italy)
New Star of the Year – Actor	New Star of the Year – Actress
Edward Albert – Butterflies Are Free as Don Baker; Frederic Forrest – When the Legends Die as Tom Black Bull; Kevin Hooks – Sounder as David Lee; Michael Sacks – Slaughterhouse-Five as Billy Pilgrim; Simon Ward – Young Winston as Winston Churchill	Diana Ross – Lady Sings the Blues as Billie Holiday; Sian Barbara Allen – You'll Like My Mother as Kathleen; Marisa Berenson – Cabaret as Natalia Landauer; Mary Costa – The Great Waltz as Jetty Treffz; Madeline Kahn – What's Up, Doc? as Eunice Burns; Victoria Principal – The Life and Times of Judge Roy Bean as Maria Elena
Best Documentary Film
Elvis on Tour; Walls of Fire; Marjoe; Russia; Sapporo Winter Olympic Games

The following films received multiple nominations:

Nominations	Title
9	Cabaret
7	The Godfather
6	Avanti!
5	Butterflies Are Free
5	Deliverance
4	Frenzy
4	The Poseidon Adventure
3	The Heartbreak Kid
3	Lady Sings the Blues
3	Pete 'n' Tillie
3	Sleuth
3	Travels with My Aunt
2	The Emigrants
2	The Life and Times of Judge Roy Bean
2	Man of La Mancha
2	Sounder
2	Young Winston

The following films received multiple wins:

Wins	Title
5	The Godfather
3	Cabaret
2	The Emigrants

=== Television ===
Best Television Series
Drama	Musical or Comedy
Columbo: America; Mannix; Medical Center; The Waltons	All in the Family: M*A*S*H; The Mary Tyler Moore Show; Maude; The Sonny & Cher Comedy Hour
Best Performance in a Television Series Drama
Actor	Actress
Peter Falk – Columbo as Lt. Columbo: Mike Connors – Mannix as Joe Mannix; William Conrad – Cannon as Frank Cannon; Chad Everett – Medical Center as Dr. Joe Gannon; David Hartman – The Bold Ones: The New Doctors as Dr. Paul Hunter; Robert Young – Marcus Welby, M.D. as Dr. Marcus Welby	Gail Fisher – Mannix as Peggy Fair: Ellen Corby – The Waltons as Esther Walton; Anne Jeffreys – The Delphi Bureau as Sybil Van Lowreen; Michael Learned – The Waltons as Olivia Walton; Peggy Lipton – The Mod Squad as Julie Barnes; Susan Saint James – McMillan & Wife as Sally McMillan
Best Performance in a Television Series – Musical or Comedy
Actor	Actress
Redd Foxx – Sanford and Son as Fred G. Sanford: Alan Alda – M*A*S*H as Benjamin Franklin "Hawkeye" Pierce; Bill Cosby – The New Bill Cosby Show as Various Characters; Paul Lynde – The Paul Lynde Show as Paul Simms; Carroll O'Connor – All in the Family as Archie Bunker; Flip Wilson – The Flip Wilson Show as Various Characters	Jean Stapleton – All in the Family as Edith Bunker: Julie Andrews – The Julie Andrews Hour as Various Characters; Bea Arthur – Maude as Maude Findlay; Carol Burnett – The Carol Burnett Show as Various Characters; Mary Tyler Moore – The Mary Tyler Moore Show as Mary Richards
Best Supporting Performance in a Series, Miniseries or Television Film
Supporting Actor	Supporting Actress
James Brolin – Marcus Welby, M.D. as Dr. Steven Kiley: Ed Asner – The Mary Tyler Moore Show as Lou Grant; Ted Knight – The Mary Tyler Moore Show as Ted Baxter; Harvey Korman – The Carol Burnett Show as Various Characters; Rob Reiner – All in the Family as Michael Stivic	Ruth Buzzi – Rowan & Martin's Laugh-In as Various Characters: Susan Dey – The Partridge Family as Laurie Partridge; Valerie Harper – The Mary Tyler Moore Show as Rhoda Morgenstern; Vicki Lawrence – The Carol Burnett Show as Various Characters; Audra Lindley – Bridget Loves Bernie as Amy Fitzgerald; Sally Struthers – All in the Family as Gloria Stivic; Elena Verdugo – Marcus Welby, M.D. as Consuelo Lopez
Best Miniseries or Television Film
That Certain Summer: Footsteps; The Glass House; Kung Fu; A War of Children

The following programs received multiple nominations:

Nominations	Title
5	All in the Family
5	The Mary Tyler Moore Show
3	The Carol Burnett Show
3	Mannix
3	Marcus Welby, M.D.
3	The Waltons
2	Columbo
2	M*A*S*H
2	Maude
2	Medical Center

The following programs received multiple wins:

Wins	Title
2	All in the Family
2	Columbo

=== Cecil B. DeMille Award ===
Samuel Goldwyn
