= Kari Sylwan =

- Born: 15 October 1940 (age 85); Stockholm, Stockholms län, Sweden
- Occupations: Actress; Dancer; Choreographer

Kari Sylwan (born 15 October 1940) is a Swedish actress, dancer, ballet teacher, and choreographer.

== Career ==
Sylwan started as a dancer in 1956 at the Royal Swedish Ballet and at the Cullberg Ballet. At both companies she danced leading parts, for example the title roles in Birgit Cullberg's The Lady from the Sea, based on Ibsen's play, and her adaptation of Strindberg's Miss Julie. Sylwan later acted in the Ingmar Bergman films Cries and Whispers and Face to Face. With dancer Karin Thulin, Sylwan created the two-person company Kari och Karin ("Kari and Karin"), touring in Sweden and also appearing on television. From 1996 to 2005 she was the vice-chancellor of the University College of Dance in Stockholm. In 2005 she was awarded the H. M. The King's Medal of the 12th order for her contributions to dance.

Recently, she has starred in Swedish music videos, including Fever Ray's "Seven" in 2009 and The Knife's "Full of Fire" (which is also a short film by Marit Östberg) in 2013.

== Filmography ==
Year	Title	Role	Notes
1956	Suss gott	Eva (dancer)	
1957	Encounters in the Twilight	Guest at the Party	Uncredited
1959	Sängkammartjuven	Kiki	Uncredited
1972	Cries and Whispers	Anna	
1976	Face to Face	Maria Jacobi	Uncredited
1980	Barnens ö	Dancer on TV	
1982	Skulden	Fru Kraus	TV Mini-Series
