= Sounder (novel) =

1969 young adult novel by William H. Armstrong

- First edition
- Author: William H. Armstrong
- Illustrator: James Barkley
- Language: English
- Publisher: Harper & Row
- Publication date: 1969
- Publication place: United States
- Media type: Print (hardcover and paperback)
- Pages: 116
- ISBN: 0-06-440020-4
- OCLC: 9631903
- LC Class: PZ7.A73394 So
- Followed by: Sour Land

Sounder is a young adult novel by William H. Armstrong, published in 1969. It is the story of an African-American boy living with his sharecropper family. Although the family's difficulties increase when the father is imprisoned for stealing a ham from work, the boy still hungers for an education.

Sounder, the dog's name, is the only character name used in the book. The author refers to the various characters by their relationship or their role in the story. The setting is also ambiguous. The author notes prisoners were hauled in "mule-drawn wagons", and the mention of chain gangs places an upper limit to the story of 1955 when the practice ended. The boy hears his father may be in Bartow and later Gilmer counties, but the author does not specify where the boy lives.

Sounder won the Newbery Award in 1970. The novel was adapted into the 1972 film of the same name, which was later nominated for the Academy Award for Best Picture.

== Plot summary ==
The black sharecropper's family is poor and hungry. The father and his dog, Sounder, go hunting each night, but the hunting is inadequate. The family subsists on fried corn mush, biscuits, and milk gravy until one morning they wake up to the smell of boiling ham. They feast for three days, but finally the sheriff and two of his deputies burst into the cabin and arrest the father for stealing the ham. Sounder chases after them, and one of the deputies shoots him with a shotgun.

The arrested man's son goes looking for Sounder but cannot find him. Returning to the scene of the shooting, the boy finds a part of Sounder's ear. While his mother cautions him not to "be all hope", the boy searches for the dog every day for weeks. In the father's absence, the family survives on the money the mother makes by selling cracked walnuts. The boy helps to look after his three younger siblings and experiences the intense loneliness of the cabin.

For Christmas, the boy's mother makes a four-layer cake for him to take to his father in jail. When he arrives, the guard treats him rudely. Finally the boy is admitted, and the guard breaks the cake into pieces, saying he suspects it could hide something which could help the boy's father escape. The boy gives the mangled cake to his father anyway and tells him that Sounder might not be dead. Their conversation is strained and difficult. The father tells the boy not to come back to the jail, and he goes home.

About two months after the father's arrest, the boy awakes to the sound of faint whining, goes outside, and finds Sounder standing there. The dog can only use three legs, has only one ear and one eye, and no longer barks. The boy and his mother welcome the dog home.

Once the family learns that the father was convicted and sentenced to hard labor, the boy resolves to search for his father. During the late fall and winter months over a period of several years, he journeys within and among counties, looking for working convicts, seeking word of his father. He also tries with some success to teach himself to read signs and newspapers.

One day he is leaning against a fence, watching a group of convicts at a road camp, trying to make out his father's form, when a guard whacks the boy on the fingers with a piece of iron and tells him to leave. While the boy walks toward the outskirts of town, he sees someone putting a book in a trash can. It is a large volume of Montaigne, and the boy takes it with him. He finds a school where he tries to wash the blood off his hands. While he is at the pump, the boy meets an old teacher who dresses his wounds and asks what happened to him. The boy tells the teacher about Sounder and his father and, observing the book, the teacher extends an offer to the boy to live with him and learn to read. The boy's mother tells him to go, and he stays with the teacher during the winter, working in the fields in summer.

One August day, the boy is at home helping with chores when they see his father walking toward them. One side of his father's body is crippled from being crushed in a quarry. Sounder, who has anticipated the man's return for days, runs out to meet him and barks.

Weeks later, the man and his dog go hunting for the first time since the man's return. The man has been waiting until he can invite his son, but now he sees that the boy is tired from fieldwork, and the man further senses that the activity might no longer interest the boy. At dawn, Sounder comes back without his master and, when the boy follows Sounder to the man, he finds him dead. Before leaving to return to school, the boy tells his mother that Sounder will be dead before he can come back for the holiday. Two weeks before Christmas, Sounder crawls under the porch and dies. Despite their deaths, there is a sense of peace and resolution over the family - especially for the boy, who has achieved the thing he most wanted - to learn to read.

== Background ==
According to the author, the story is the story of an elderly black man named Charles Jones, who was a teacher at a school for black children and worked for Armstrong's father after school. He taught the young Armstrong to read and told him numerous stories, including Aesop's Fables, stories from the Old Testament, stories from Homer, and the story of the dog Sounder.

== Film ==
In 1972, Sounder was made into a film starring Cicely Tyson, Paul Winfield, Kevin Hooks, Carmen Mathews, Taj Mahal, and Eric Hooks. It was written by Lonne Elder III and directed by Martin Ritt.

In 2003, ABC's Wonderful World of Disney aired a new film adaptation, reuniting two actors from the original. Kevin Hooks directed and Paul Winfield played the role of the teacher. Winfield and Hooks played father and son, respectively, in the original version.

== Bibliography ==
- Sara L. Schwebel (2011). Child-sized History: Fictions of the Past in U.S. Classrooms. Vanderbilt University Press. ISBN 9780826517920.

Awards
Preceded by The High King	The Newbery Medal recipient 1970	Succeeded by Summer of the Swans
Preceded by n/a	Mark Twain Award; 1972	Succeeded by Mrs. Frisby and the Rats of NIMH
