= Sleuth (1972 film) =

1972 film by Joseph L. Mankiewicz

- Theatrical release poster
- Directed by: Joseph L. Mankiewicz
- Screenplay by: Anthony Shaffer
- Based on: Sleuth by Anthony Shaffer
- Produced by: Morton Gottlieb
- Starring: Laurence Olivier; Michael Caine
- Cinematography: Oswald Morris
- Edited by: Richard Marden
- Music by: John Addison
- Production company: Palomar Pictures International
- Distributed by: 20th Century-Fox
- Release date: 11 December 1972 (US)
- Running time: 138 minutes
- Countries: United Kingdom; United States
- Language: English
- Budget: $3.5 million
- Box office: $5.7 million (rentals)

Sleuth is a 1972 mystery thriller film directed by Joseph L. Mankiewicz and starring Laurence Olivier and Michael Caine. The screenplay by playwright Anthony Shaffer was based on his 1970 Tony Award-winning play. Both Olivier and Caine were nominated for Academy Awards for their performances. This was Mankiewicz's final film. Critics gave the film overwhelmingly positive reviews.

== Plot ==
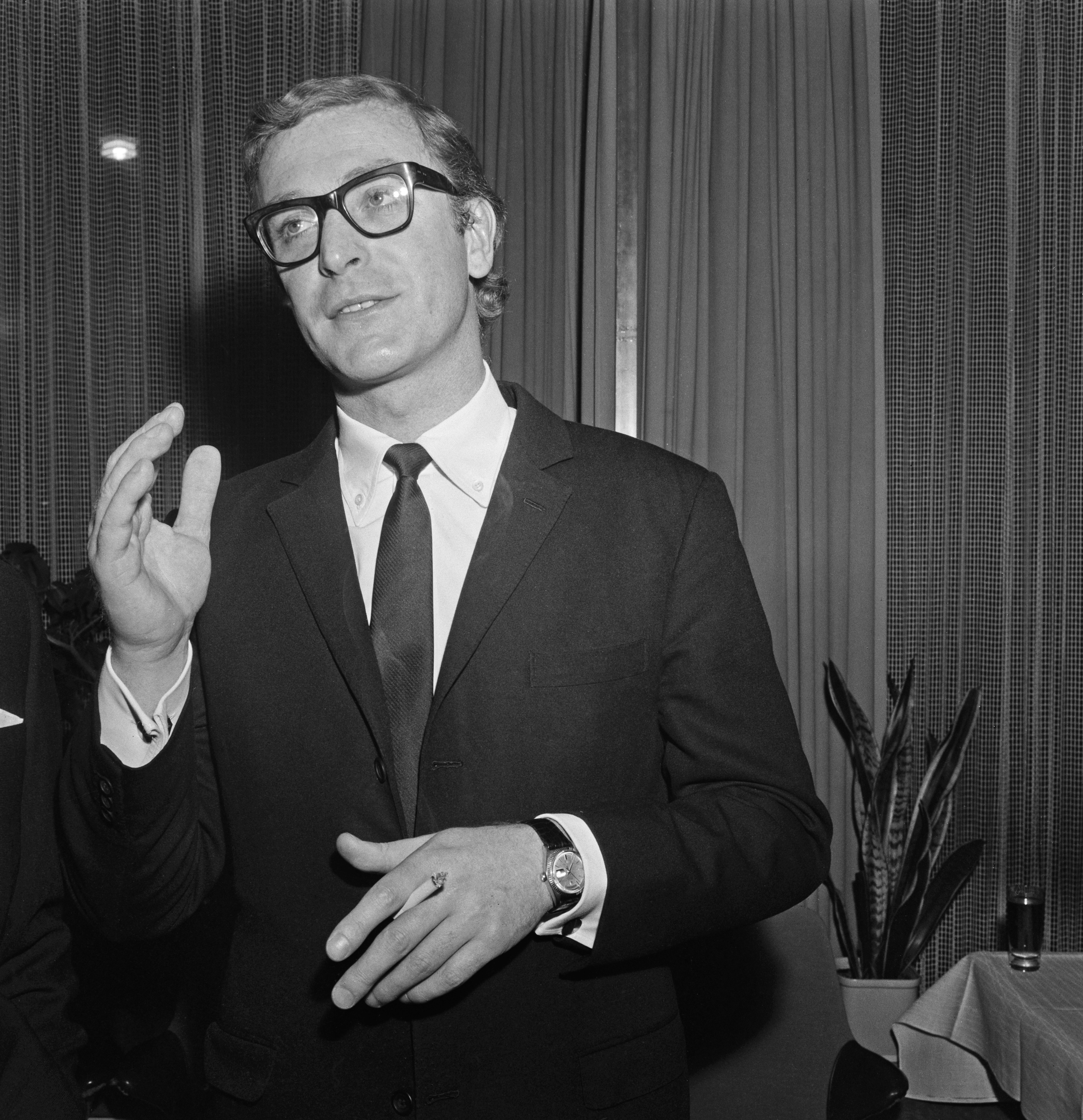
Michael Caine plays Milo Tindle, who seeks revenge on Andrew Wyke for a game of humiliation.

Andrew Wyke, a successful crime fiction author, lives in a country manor house filled with elaborate games and automata. He invites his wife's lover, Milo Tindle, the owner of two hair salons, to his home and says he would like Milo to take his wife, Marguerite, off his hands so he can be with his more desirable mistress, Téa. To provide Milo, whose salons are not yet fully profitable, the means to support the high-maintenance Marguerite, Andrew suggests that Milo steal valuable jewellery from the house, with Andrew recouping his losses through an insurance claim. Milo agrees, and Andrew leads him through an elaborate scheme to fake a robbery.

At the conclusion, Andrew pulls a gun on Milo and reveals that the bogus theft was merely a ruse to frame Milo as a burglar so he can kill him. Berating Milo's profession as a hairdresser and background as the "un-English" son of an Italian immigrant (originally Tindelini) who went to a "second-rate public school," Andrew cannot accept that his wife left him for such an "unworthy" rival. He puts the gun to Milo's head; there is a gunshot, and the screen cuts to black.

A few days later, Inspector Doppler arrives to investigate Milo's disappearance. Andrew purports to know nothing, but as the inspector collates incriminating clues, Andrew breaks down and explains the burglary hoax. He insists that he only pretended to shoot Milo using a blank cartridge and that his rival left humiliated but unharmed. After finding evidence supporting a murder, Doppler arrests Andrew. As Andrew is about to be taken to the station, Doppler reveals himself as a heavily disguised Milo, seeking revenge on Andrew.

The score is seemingly evened, though Andrew is unable to admit being duped and pretends he saw through Milo's disguise while expressing admiration for Milo having been a worthy opponent and games player. A still dissatisfied Milo expresses that Andrew has not experienced the level of humiliation of his own imminent death. He announces they will play another game involving a real murder. Milo says he fatally strangled Andrew's mistress, Téa, and has planted incriminating evidence throughout Andrew's house. The police, who have been tipped off, will arrive soon. Andrew dismisses his claim, but phones Téa, only to learn from her flatmate, Joyce, that Téa is dead.

Following Milo's cryptic clues, Andrew frantically searches the house for the planted evidence. Andrew finds the last item just as Milo says the police are arriving. The dishevelled Andrew pleads with Milo to stall them while he composes himself. Milo is heard ostensibly talking to the officers, but there are actually no police. Milo then reveals that he faked Téa's death, with Joyce and Téa's willing assistance as payback for the games of humiliation Andrew has inflicted on Téa, thus tricking Andrew a second time. Andrew is further humiliated when Milo reveals that Téa informed him that Andrew is practically impotent and has not had relations with her in over a year.

As Milo prepares to leave, fetching Marguerite's fur coat and belongings, he continues humiliating Andrew with information provided by Andrew's wife and mistress. Inspired again by the burglary scenario, Andrew threatens to shoot Milo to stop him from bragging about his humiliation to anyone else―especially Marguerite. However, Milo says he really did report Andrew's burglary setup and assault to the police, who were initially sceptical but assured him they would follow-up; for this reason, Milo points out, the police now would not believe Andrew's concocted story of killing a burglar. Nevertheless, Andrew, pushed too far when Milo ridicules his literary detective, shoots and mortally wounds Milo. The police arrive outside, and a distraught and defeated Andrew locks himself inside the house. As Milo lies dying, he tells Andrew to tell the police that "it was just a bloody game"; he then presses the automata control box, leaving Andrew surrounded by a cacophony of his activated electronic toys as police pound on the door for entry.

== Cast ==
- Laurence Olivier as Andrew Wyke
- Michael Caine as Milo Tindle

The production team intended to reveal as little about the movie as possible so as to make the conclusion a complete surprise to the audience. For this reason, the opening credits list fictional people playing roles that do not exist. They are Alec Cawthorne as Inspector Doppler, John Matthews as Detective Sergeant Tarrant, Eve Channing (named after the characters Eve Harrington and Margo Channing from Mankiewicz's 1950 film All About Eve) as Marguerite Wyke, and Teddy Martin as Police Constable Higgs. Vincent Canby's review for The New York Times also listed fictitious actress Karen Minfort-Jones as playing Andrew's mistress Teya [sic].

== Production ==
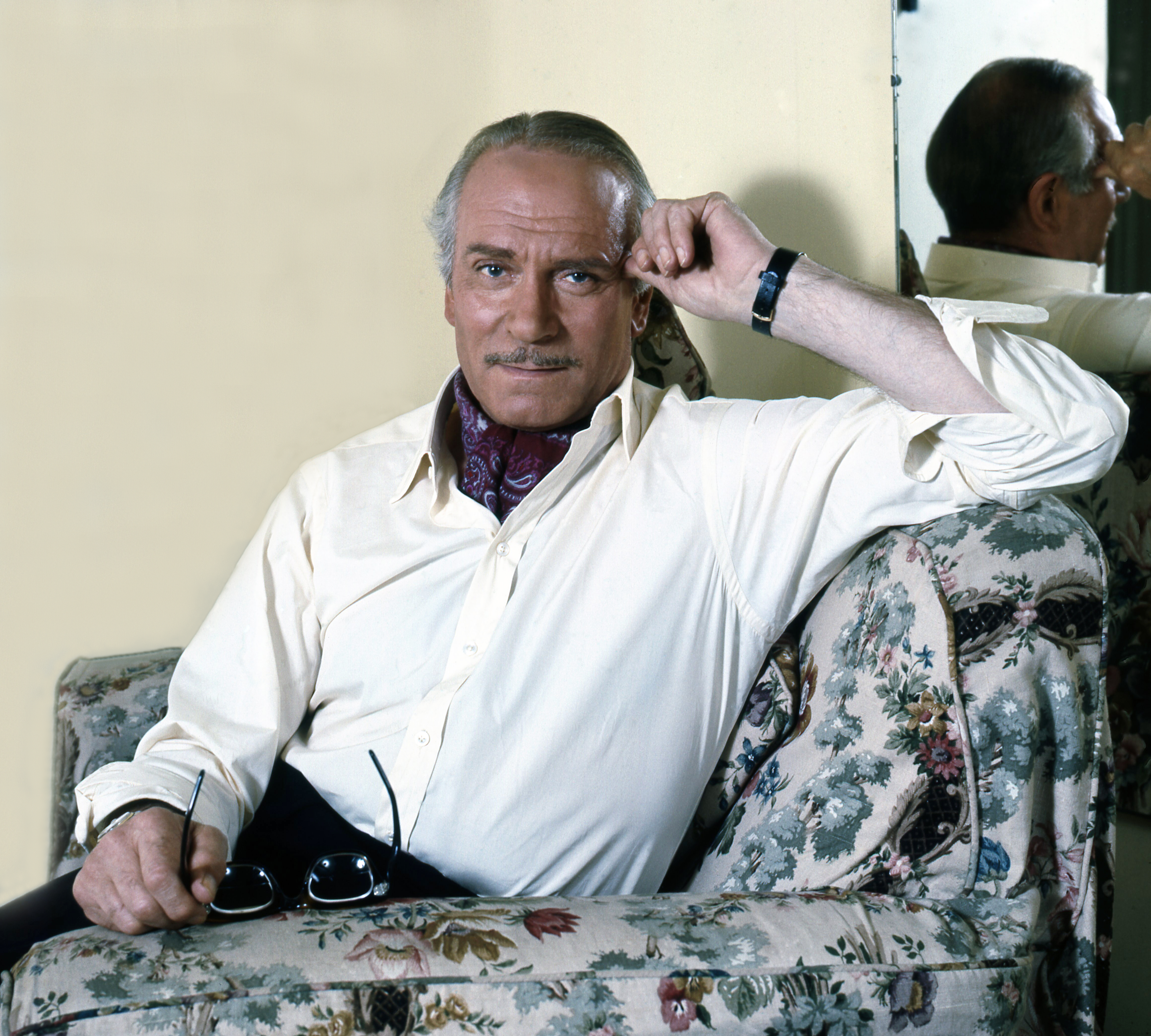
Laurence Olivier, who plays Andrew Wyke, in his dressing room on the set of Sleuth (1972)

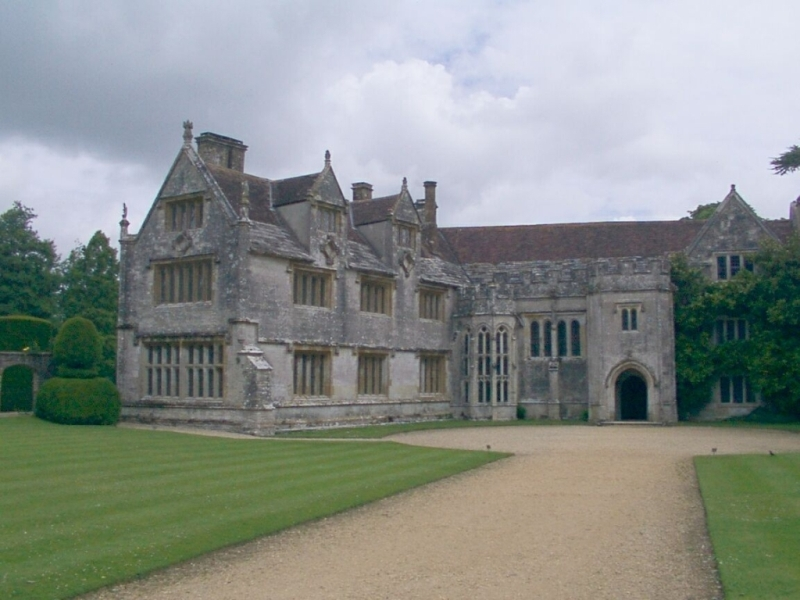
Athelhampton House, Dorset, used for the exterior scenes in the movie

Shaffer was initially reluctant to sell the film rights to the play, fearful it would undercut the success of the stage version. When he finally did relent, he hoped the film would retain the services of Anthony Quayle, who had essayed the role of Wyke in London and on Broadway. Alan Bates was Shaffer's pick for the part of Milo Tindle. In the end, director Mankiewicz opted for Olivier and Caine.

When they met, Caine asked Olivier how he should address him. Olivier told him that it should be as "Lord Olivier", and added that now that that was settled he could call him "Larry". According to Shaffer, Olivier stated that when filming began he looked upon Caine as an assistant, but that by the end of filming he regarded him as a full partner. According to Stephen Sondheim (who Shaffer had partly taken for inspiration for the original play when it came to his penchant for playing games), when he met Olivier sometime after the production had finished shooting, Olivier had said he based his performance on Sondheim.

The likeness of actress Joanne Woodward was used for the painting of Marguerite Wyke.

Much of the story revolves around the theme of crime fiction, as written by John Dickson Carr (St John Lord Merridew = Sir Henry Merrivale), on whom Olivier's physical appearance is modelled, and Agatha Christie, whose photo is included on Wyke's wall, and how it relates to real-life criminal investigations. Class conflict is also raised between Wyke, who has the trappings of an English country gentleman, compared to Tindle, the son of an immigrant from a poor area of London.

Bristol Myers Squibb (Palomar Pictures International) owns the rights to The Heartbreak Kid (1972) and Sleuth (1972).

== Release ==
Sleuth opened at the Ziegfeld Theatre in New York City on December 10, 1972 and at the Bruin Theatre in Los Angeles on December 13, 1972. After 8 days of release, it had grossed $70,781 from the 2 theatres.

== Reception and legacy ==
On Rotten Tomatoes the film has an approval rating of 90% based on reviews from 29 critics.

The film was nominated for Academy Awards for Best Actor in a Leading Role (Michael Caine and Laurence Olivier), Best Director and Best Music, Original Dramatic Score. Olivier won the New York Film Critics award for Best Actor as a compromise selection after the voters became deadlocked in a choice between Marlon Brando and Al Pacino in The Godfather after Stacy Keach in Fat City won a plurality in initial voting and rules were changed requiring a majority. Shaffer received an Edgar Award for his screenplay.

The film was the second to have practically its entire cast (Caine and Olivier) nominated for Academy Awards after Who's Afraid of Virginia Woolf? in 1966 and the first where exactly all of the actors in the film were nominated. (Virginia Woolf featured uncredited bit parts by actors playing the roadhouse manager and waitress.) This feat has been repeated only by Give 'em Hell, Harry! (1975), in which James Whitmore is the sole credited actor.

Critics Roger Ebert, Janet Maslin, Gary Arnold of The Washington Post, and several film historians have all noted similarities between Sleuth and Caine's 1982 film Deathtrap. SCTV episode 121 featured Dave Thomas playing Michael Caine, arguing that the two films were different because the library appeared on different sides of the set.

=== Accolades ===
Award	Category	Nominee(s)	Result	Ref.
Academy Awards	Best Director	Joseph L. Mankiewicz	Nominated	
Academy Awards	Best Actor	Michael Caine	Nominated	
Academy Awards	Best Actor	Laurence Olivier	Nominated	
Academy Awards	Best Original Dramatic Score	John Addison	Nominated	
British Academy Film Awards	Best Actor in a Leading Role	Laurence Olivier	Nominated	
British Academy Film Awards	Best Screenplay	Anthony Shaffer	Nominated	
British Academy Film Awards	Best Art Direction	Ken Adam	Nominated	
British Academy Film Awards	Best Cinematography	Oswald Morris	Nominated	
Cinema Writers Circle Awards	Best Foreign Film	Morton Gottlieb	Won	
David di Donatello Awards	Best Foreign Actor	Laurence Olivier	Won (Note: Tied with Yves Montand for César and Rosalie.)	
Edgar Allan Poe Awards	Best Motion Picture	Anthony Shaffer	Won	
Evening Standard British Film Awards	Best Actor	Michael Caine	Won	
Golden Globe Awards	Best Motion Picture – Drama		Nominated	
Golden Globe Awards	Best Actor in a Motion Picture – Drama	Michael Caine	Nominated	
Golden Globe Awards	Best Actor in a Motion Picture – Drama	Laurence Olivier	Nominated	
New York Film Critics Circle Awards	Best Actor	Laurence Olivier	Won	

== Deleted footage ==
While questioning Wyke, Doppler points out that the clown costume that Tindle was wearing when he was shot is missing, though the clown's mask is later found and put on the head of the plastic skeleton in the cellar. He is probably implying that Tindle was buried with it.

In the trailer for the film, there are the scenes with Doppler laying out the evidence against Wyke as shown in the movie. They include him pulling open the shower curtains in one of the bathrooms and exposing the clown's jacket, dripping wet and apparently with bloodstains on it. This scene was not included in the final film.

== Preservation ==
The Academy Film Archive preserved Sleuth in 2012.

== 2007 film ==
In September 2006 Kenneth Branagh announced at the Venice Film Festival his new film of the play, with the screenplay by Nobel laureate Harold Pinter. Caine starred in this adaptation, this time in the role of Wyke, and Jude Law played Tindle as a struggling actor. Production was completed in March 2007 and the film was released in the UK on 23 November 2007. The remake did not use any of the dialogue in Shaffer's original script and was considered unsuccessful in comparison with the original.

== See also ==
- List of American films of 1972
- "This Charming Man", 1983 hit single by The Smiths that quotes some film dialogue in the lyrics.
