= National Board of Review Awards 1972 =

Annual US film awards ceremony

44th National Board of Review Awards

December 14, 1972

The 44th National Board of Review Awards were announced on December 14, 1972.

== Top Ten Films ==
1. Cabaret
2. Man of La Mancha
3. The Godfather
4. Sounder
5. 1776
6. The Effect of Gamma Rays on Man-in-the-Moon Marigolds
7. Deliverance
8. The Ruling Class
9. The Candidate
10. Frenzy

== Top Foreign Films ==
1. The Sorrow and the Pity
2. The Emigrants
3. The Discreet Charm of the Bourgeoisie
4. Chloe in the Afternoon
5. Uncle Vanya

== Winners ==
- Best Film:
  - Cabaret
- Best Foreign Film:
  - The Sorrow and the Pity
- Best Actor:
  - Peter O'Toole - Man of La Mancha, The Ruling Class
- Best Actress:
  - Cicely Tyson - Sounder
- Best Supporting Actor:
  - Al Pacino - The Godfather
  - Joel Grey - Cabaret
- Best Supporting Actress:
  - Marisa Berenson - Cabaret
- Best Director:
  - Bob Fosse - Cabaret
