= The Heartbreak Kid (1972 film) =

1972 film by Elaine May

- Theatrical release poster
- Directed by: Elaine May
- Screenplay by: Neil Simon
- Based on: "A Change of Plan" by Bruce Jay Friedman
- Produced by: Edgar J. Scherick
- Starring: Charles Grodin; Cybill Shepherd; Jeannie Berlin; Audra Lindley; Eddie Albert
- Cinematography: Owen Roizman
- Edited by: John Carter
- Music by: Garry Sherman
- Production company: Palomar Pictures
- Distributed by: 20th Century Fox
- Release date: December 17, 1972
- Running time: 106 minutes
- Country: United States
- Language: English
- Box office: $5.6 million (US rentals)

The Heartbreak Kid is a 1972 American romantic black comedy film directed by Elaine May and written by Neil Simon, starring Charles Grodin, Cybill Shepherd, Jeannie Berlin, Audra Lindley, Eddie Albert and Doris Roberts. It is based on the short story "A Change of Plan", written by Bruce Jay Friedman and first published in Esquire in 1966.

In the film, self-absorbed salesman Lenny Cantrow (Grodin) marries his girlfriend Lila Kolodny (Berlin) after a short courtship. During his honeymoon, Lenny increasingly tires of Lila, finding that her earlier habits during courtship now irritate and repel him. Before the end of the honeymoon the salesman falls for college-aged heiress Kelly Corcoran (Shepherd) and impulsively courts her against her father Duane's (Albert) wishes.

The film garnered positive reviews upon its release. At the 45th Academy Awards, Berlin was nominated for Best Supporting Actress, and Albert for Best Supporting Actor. The Heartbreak Kid was ranked number 91 on AFI's 100 Years... 100 Laughs, a list of the funniest American films ever made. A remake was made in 2007.

== Plot ==
In New York City, after a short courtship, emotionally shallow, self-absorbed Lenny Cantrow, a sporting goods salesman, is married to Lila, an earnest young woman who expects long-term emotional commitment from Lenny.

During their honeymoon in Miami Beach, Lenny meets and pursues the beautiful but shallow Kelly Corcoran, a college student on holiday with her wealthy parents. When Lila is severely sunburned, Lenny quarantines her to their hotel room while he engages in a series of rendezvous with Kelly, lying to Lila about his whereabouts and making outlandish stories to explain why he was late. Lenny tells Kelly that she is the woman he has been "waiting for" all of his life, and that he just "timed it wrong". After meeting with Kelly several times over the course of only three days, Lenny impulsively ends his marriage in order to pursue an indifferent Kelly, leaving Lila heartbroken after only five days of marriage.

Lenny follows Kelly to her parents' home in Minnesota, where he tells Kelly he wants to marry her, to which Kelly responds that she is flattered and already has a boyfriend. A little later in Lenny's car, the two kiss. Lenny continues trying to impress Kelly, but her resentful and protective father stands in his way. Following an awkward dinner where Lenny inanely praises Midwestern produce as having "no deceit", Mr. Corcoran tells Lenny he sees through his ploy, and offers him a $25,000 bribe to leave. Lenny angrily refuses and soon marries Kelly.

At the reception, Lenny engages in fairly mindless conversation with several of the guests, one of whom owns a company that manufactures tear gas, which Lenny says there is a lot of money in. He is reduced to quoting cliches to two uncomprehending children and is left alone as the party continues around him.

== Cast ==
- Charles Grodin as Lenny Cantrow
- Cybill Shepherd as Kelly Corcoran
- Jeannie Berlin as Lila Kolodny
- Audra Lindley as Mrs. Corcoran
- Eddie Albert as Duane Corcoran
- Mitchell Jason as Cousin Ralph
- William Prince as Colorado Man
- Augusta Dabney as Colorado Woman
- Doris Roberts as Mrs. Cantrow
- Marilyn Putnam as Mrs. Kolodny
- Jack Hausman as Mr. Kolodny
- Erik Lee Preminger as Waiter
- Art Metrano as Entertainer
- Tim Browne as Kelly's Boyfriend
- Jean Scoppa as Flower Girl
- Greg Scherick as Young Boy

== Style ==
The film is a black comedy, examining love and hypocrisy through a lens of pointed, subtle humor. Though it contains broad jokes, occasionally going for "laughs without shame", Elaine May is credited with emotionally grounding the film and providing "a real understanding of character" through eliciting the kind of "caustic, almost powerful humor that comes from moments of wincing recognition when human foibles are accurately captured and revealed". As another reviewer wrote in Sight & Sound, May's strength lies in her "obsessive and affectionate observations of character".

May shared with her late comedy partner Mike Nichols (1931–2014) a sparse, dialogue-oriented style and a quizzical perspective. She places an emphasis on character comedy; The Hollywood Reporter commented on her stylistic decisions to derive humor "from situations rather than obvious one-line jokes" and make comedic choices which "flow effortlessly from rhythmic dialogue, explosions of laughter". The New Yorker's Pauline Kael wrote: "Elaine May has the rarest kind of comic gift: the ability to create a world seen comically".

May's focus on comedic honesty, backlit by pain and misfortune, stylistically influenced a new generation of films. She helped push comedy into a "golden age as the result of the rise of the semi-surreal comedy of mishap, pain, insult, and desperation".

== Themes ==
=== Love and Jewish identity ===
The Heartbreak Kid is a particularly Jewish story, with The Village Voice calling it "the culminating work of Hollywood's Jewish new wave". All the filmmakers are Jewish: Bruce Jay Friedman, Neil Simon, May, producer Edgar J. Scherick and composers Burt Bacharach and Hal David. The story follows Lenny Cantrow (Charles Grodin), the embodiment of the Jewish archetype of the "schlemiel" (bungler), as he dumps Lila Kolodny (Jeannie Berlin), a "kvetchy Jew" and "sloppy, incipient yenta", for the girl of his dreams, all-American WASP Kelly Corcoran (Cybill Shepherd). The film is a deadpan fever dream of shiksa-chasing, taking place in what Bruce Jay Friedman dubs in the original short story "A Change of Plan" as the land of "strange blonde people".

The character of Lila in particular has been labelled extremely stereotypical; Film Quarterly likened her to a female Portnoy from Portnoy's Complaint, publishing a review stating: "Philip Roth's friendly anti-Semitism is strikingly similar to Friedman's". Some critics have expressed concerns that the movie forwards a stilted vision of the modern female Jew and implicitly asks the question: "Why be married to a cloying, unsophisticated, slightly overweight Jewish girl who speaks with a discernible sing-song Jewish intonation (Yiddish influence) when you can perhaps conquer a very Waspy-looking, knockout blonde shiksa type?" This is despite the intentions of Jeannie Berlin, who told The New York Times that she did her best to honor the character and give Lila depth: "You see, I didn't want to make that girl stupid. It would have been so easy to do Lila stupid. I don't think Lila was stupid. I think every single thing she did was justified to her... And she really was terrifically in love". For the role of Lila, Simon wanted Diane Keaton, but May thought the intended contrast between Jewish and gentile wouldn't be strong enough.

Lenny's behavior as a classic nebbish Jew is thoughtless, as he leaves Lila high and dry on their honeymoon. Charles Grodin said afterwards that although he played the character with full sincerity, he had "pretty much indelibly stamped [himself] into the moviegoing public's consciousness as a jerk". Still, he said, many viewers misread the film as an illustration of precisely Jewish annoyances, and not as critique: "The number of men who tell me how much they loved the movie and how much they identified with the character, while flattering, is also somewhat frightening".

The final moments of the film depict Lenny failing to communicate with Kelly's gentile family. It highlights how he gave up his personal cultural traditions, and how he misses them. Having walked down the aisle to Kelly as a large cross hung overhead, Lenny sits on the couch by himself, swimming in a sea of midwestern Christianity, as listless and alienated as ever.

== Reception ==
The film has received almost universal praise from critics. As of 2024, the film had an approval rating of 92% at review aggregator Rotten Tomatoes based on 60 reviews, with an average score of 7.60/10. The website's critical consensus reads: "An uproariously funny confluence of top-shelf talent, The Heartbreak Kid finds bittersweet humor in attitudes toward love and marriage in early '70s America." On Metacritic, the film has a weighted average score of 74 out of 100, based on 12 critics, indicating "generally favorable reviews".

Vincent Canby of The New York Times declared it to be "a first-class American comedy, as startling in its way as was The Graduate". Roger Ebert of the Chicago Sun-Times gave the film 3.5 stars out of 4 in a review that concludes: "It's a comedy, but there's more in it than that; it's a movie about the ways we pursue, possess, and consume each other as sad commodities". Gene Siskel of the Chicago Tribune awarded the same 3.5/4 grade and wrote that "the heavy-handed comedy undermines the serious aspect of the movie—we really can't believe that Lenny would marry her in the first place. The overall high quality of the acting, however, does sustain the film". Variety called it a "bright, amusing saga" until the "audience is jolted by a sudden shut-off ending with no climax whatsoever". Charles Champlin of the Los Angeles Times wrote that Grodin and Berlin "bring off hugely difficult comedy assignment with great style. Amidst increasing farcical events, they both somehow manage to preserve a sense of credible, foolish but sympathetic individuals lurking beneath the follies". The Washington Post thought that the film "has its faults, but it's also one of the most entertaining and original American film comedies of the last few years". The Independent Film Journal called it an "unquestionably brilliant comedy". Leonard Maltin gave the film three stars out of four, and described it as "Either hilarious or horrifying, depending on your point of view; directed for maximum impact by May."

Variety noted in its review that the sudden ending of the film might have been indicative of another ending that had been planned, and later noted that Fox handed out a synopsis at screenings including an ending where "as they sail for Europe on their honeymoon, Lenny makes some startling discoveries about Kelly - and The Heartbreak Kid comes to its bitingly funny end".

== Accolades ==
Award	Category	Nominee(s)	Result	Ref.
Academy Awards	Best Supporting Actor	Eddie Albert	Nominated	
Academy Awards	Best Supporting Actress	Jeannie Berlin	Nominated	
Golden Globe Awards	Best Actor in a Motion Picture – Musical or Comedy	Charles Grodin	Nominated	
Golden Globe Awards	Best Supporting Actress – Motion Picture	Jeannie Berlin	Nominated	
Golden Globe Awards	Best Screenplay – Motion Picture	Neil Simon	Nominated	
National Society of Film Critics Awards	Best Supporting Actor	Eddie Albert	Won (Note: Tied with Joel Grey for Cabaret.)	
National Society of Film Critics Awards	Best Supporting Actress	Jeannie Berlin	Won	
National Society of Film Critics Awards	Best Supporting Actress	Cybill Shepherd	4th Place	
New York Film Critics Circle Awards	Best Supporting Actor	Eddie Albert	Runner-up	
New York Film Critics Circle Awards	Best Supporting Actress	Jeannie Berlin	Won	
Writers Guild of America Awards	Best Comedy – Adapted from Another Medium	Neil Simon	Nominated	

=== American Film Institute ===
In 2000, the film was ranked 91st in the American Film Institute's 100 Years...100 Laughs list.

== Home media ==
The film was released on DVD in 1998 and in 2002. Rare 35mm prints held by the Academy Film Archive and the BFI National Archive have screened in select locations trusted and insured to handle such prints, including Metrograph and the Museum of the Moving Image in New York City in 2024 and 2025 and the Music Box Theatre in Chicago, Illinois in 2024.

Bristol Myers Squibb (Palomar Pictures International) owns the rights to The Heartbreak Kid (1972) and Sleuth (1972).

== Remake ==
A remake of the film was released in 2007, which was directed by the Farrelly Brothers and stars Ben Stiller, Michelle Monaghan, Malin Åkerman, Jerry Stiller, Rob Corddry, Carlos Mencia, Scott Wilson and Danny McBride.

== See also ==
- List of American films of 1972
