= Cries and Whispers =

1972 film by Ingmar Bergman

- Theatrical release poster
- Directed by: Ingmar Bergman
- Written by: Ingmar Bergman
- Produced by: Lars-Owe Carlberg
- Starring: Harriet Andersson; Kari Sylwan; Ingrid Thulin; Liv Ullmann
- Cinematography: Sven Nykvist
- Edited by: Siv Lundgren
- Music by: Johann Sebastian Bach; Frédéric Chopin
- Production company: Svensk Filmindustri
- Distributed by: Svensk Filmindustri
- Release dates: 21 December 1972 (United States); 5 March 1973 (Sweden)
- Running time: 91 minutes
- Country: Sweden
- Language: Swedish
- Budget: $450,000
- Box office: SEK 2,130,705 (Sweden) $1.5 million (U.S.) $3.5 million

Cries and Whispers (Swedish: Viskningar och rop, lit. 'Whispers and cries') is a 1972 Swedish tragedy film written and directed by Ingmar Bergman and starring Harriet Andersson, Kari Sylwan, Ingrid Thulin and Liv Ullmann. The film, set in a mansion at the end of the 19th century, is about three sisters and a servant who struggle with the terminal cancer of one of the sisters (Andersson). The servant (Sylwan) is close to her, while the other two sisters (Ullmann and Thulin) confront their emotional distance from each other.

Inspired by Bergman's mother, Karin Åkerblom, and his vision of four women in a red room, Cries and Whispers was filmed at Taxinge-Näsby Castle in 1971. Its themes include faith, the female psyche and the search for meaning in suffering, and academics have found Biblical allusions. Unlike previous Bergman films, it uses saturated colour, crimson in particular.

After its premiere in the United States, distributed by Roger Corman and New World Pictures, the film was released in Sweden and screened out of competition at the 1973 Cannes Film Festival. Following two unsuccessful films by Bergman, Cries and Whispers was a critical and commercial success. It received five Academy Award nominations, including one for Best Picture (rare for a foreign-language film at the time). Cinematographer Sven Nykvist won the Academy Award for Best Cinematography, and Cries and Whispers won the Guldbagge Award for Best Film and other honours.

The film inspired stage adaptations by Ivo van Hove and Andrei Șerban and influenced later cinema. It was commemorated on Swedish postage stamps referring to a scene in which Andersson and Sylwan replicate the Pietà. It is often ranked among Bergman's finest works.

== Plot ==
In a large 19th-century mansion with red walls and carpets, Agnes is dying of uterine cancer. (Note: Agnes' illness is identified as cancer of the womb by numerous authors.) Her sisters, Maria and Karin, arrive at their childhood home and take turns with the maid, Anna, watching over Agnes. Anna, more religious than the sisters, prays after she lost her young daughter. When Agnes's doctor David visits, he sees his former lover Maria. Maria remembers their affair and her failed marriage with her husband Joakim, who stabbed himself non-fatally in response to the adultery. David tells her that she has become more indifferent. Agnes remembers their mother, who neglected and teased her and favoured Maria, with greater understanding and recalls sharing a moment of sorrow with her. While Agnes' sisters remain emotionally distant, Anna comforts the suffering Agnes by baring her breasts and holding her at night.

Agnes dies after a long period of suffering, and at her wake the priest says that her faith was stronger than his own. Maria tells Karin that it is unusual for them to avoid touching each other or having a deep conversation. She tries to touch Karin, who recoils at the gesture. Karin recalls an earlier occasion at the mansion, where, struggling with self-harm, she mutilated her genitals with a piece of broken glass to repel her husband Fredrik. Karin later dines with Maria, saying that Anna was devoted to Agnes and probably deserves a memento. She says she resents Anna's seeming familiarity with her and Maria, speaks of her own suicidal tendencies, and confesses her hatred of Maria and her flirtatiousness and shallow smiles. The sisters reconcile after the argument, touching each other.

In a dream sequence, Agnes briefly returns to life and asks Karin and then Maria to approach her. Karin, repelled by the invitation, says that she still has life and does not love Agnes enough to join her. Maria approaches the undead Agnes but flees in terror when she grabs her, saying that she cannot leave her husband and children. Anna re-enters the room and takes Agnes back to bed, where she cradles the dead Agnes in her arms.

The family decides to send Anna away at the end of the month, with Fredrik refusing to award her with any additional severance pay, and the maid rejects her promised memento. Maria returns to Joakim, and Karin cannot believe Maria's claim that she does not remember their touch. Anna finds Agnes' diary with an account of a visit with Maria, Karin and Anna, with a shared, nostalgic moment on a swing. Agnes wrote that "come what may, this is happiness."

== Production ==
=== Development ===
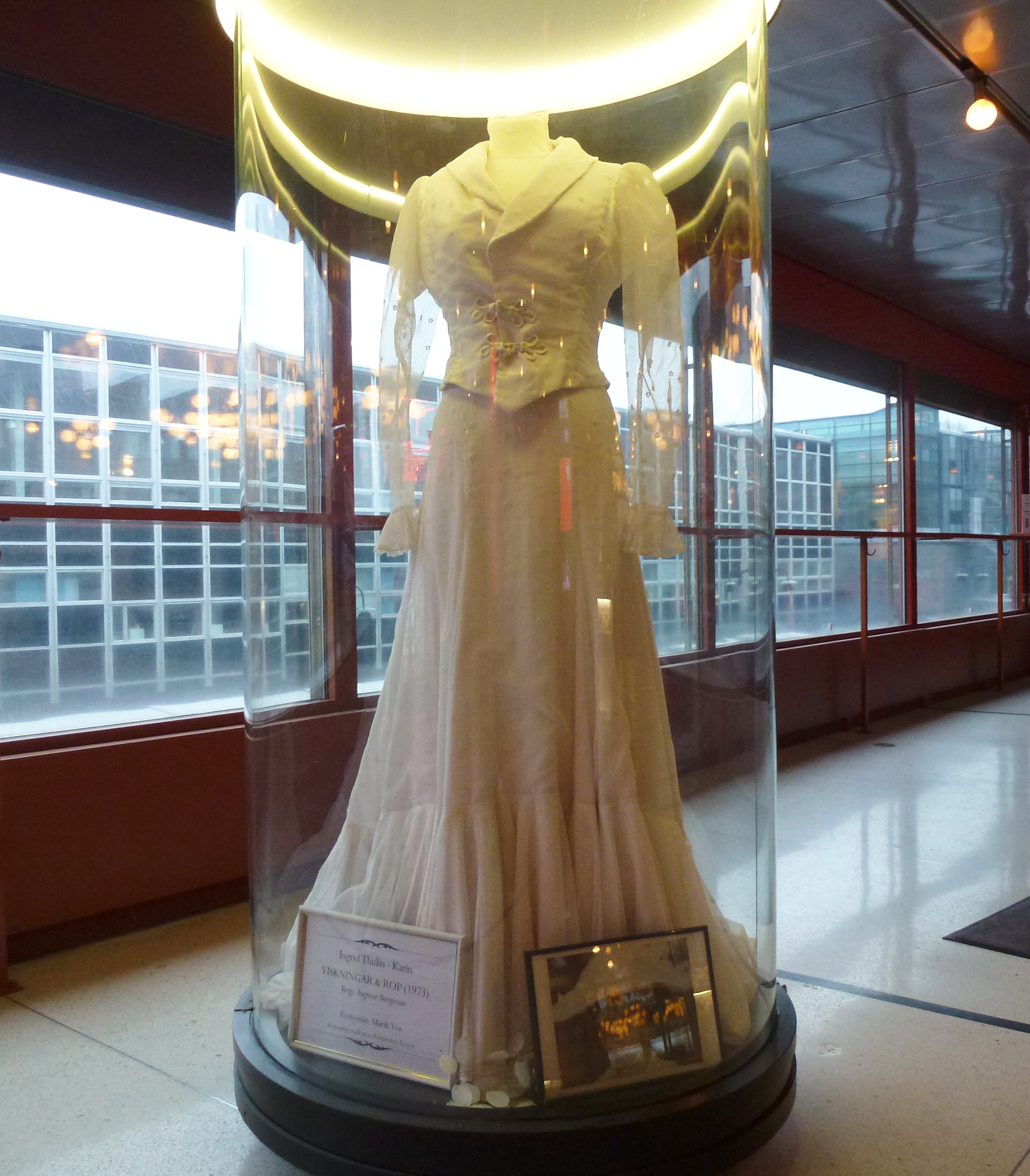
Ingrid Thulin's dress as Karin. White dresses against a red background were a key colour motif in the film.

According to Bergman, he conceived the story during a lonely, unhappy time on Fårö when he wrote constantly. He described a recurring dream of four women in white clothing in a red room, whispering to each other. He said that this symbolized his childhood view of the soul as a faceless person who was black on the outside, representing shame, and red on the inside. The persistence of the vision indicated to Bergman that it could be a film, he said, and he planned a "portrait of my mother ... the great beloved of my childhood". Karin has the same name as Bergman's mother, but all four female protagonists are intended to represent aspects of her personality.

A childhood memory of the Sophiahemmet mortuary also influenced the director:

The young girl who had just been treated lay on a wooden table in the middle of the floor. I pulled back the sheet and exposed her. She was quite naked apart from a plaster that ran from throat to pudenda. I lifted a hand and touched her shoulder. I had heard about the chill of death, but the girl's skin was not cold but hot. I moved my hand to her breast, which was small and slack with an erect black nipple. There was dark down on her abdomen. She was breathing.

Since Bergman's films were difficult to market, foreign capital was unavailable to finance the film. He decided to shoot Cries and Whispers in Swedish rather than English (as his previous film, The Touch, had been) and finance it through his production company, Cinematograph. Although he used 750,000 SEK of his savings and borrowed 200,000 SEK, he also asked the Swedish Film Institute for help with the film's 1.5-million SEK budget. This attracted some criticism, since Bergman was not an up-and-coming director in the greatest need of subsidy. To save money, the main actresses and Nykvist returned their salaries as loans and were nominal co-producers.

In his book, Images, Bergman wrote: "Today I feel that in Persona—and later in Cries and Whispers—I had gone as far as I could go. And that in these two instances when working in total freedom, I touched wordless secrets that only the cinema can discover". In an essay included with the DVD, critic Peter Cowie quoted the director: "All of my films can be thought of in terms of black and white, except Cries and Whispers".

=== Casting ===
Cast list
Actor	Role
Harriet Andersson	Agnes
Kari Sylwan	Anna
Ingrid Thulin	Karin
Liv Ullmann	Maria (and her mother)
Anders Ek	Isak, the priest
Inga Gill	Aunt Olga
Erland Josephson	David
Henning Moritzen	Joakim
Georg Årlin	Fredrik
Linn Ullmann	Maria's daughter
Lena Bergman	young Maria

When Bergman wrote the screenplay, he intended from the start to cast Liv Ullmann and Ingrid Thulin. He explained his choice of Harriet Andersson for Agnes: "I would very much like to have Harriet, too, since she belongs to this breed of enigmatic women". Andersson had not worked with Bergman for years, and he sent her notes rather than a complete screenplay. Ullmann described receiving a 50-page "personal letter" from Bergman describing the story which began, "Dear Friends: We're now going to make a film together. It is a sort of a vision that I have and I will try to describe it". (Note: Before the director's death in 2007, Ullmann starred in 11 of his works and became known as his muse. Roger Ebert remarked Bergman and Ullmann's "lives have been intertwined since Persona, and that's been the most important fact in ... [Ullmann's] artistic life", and they also had a daughter, Linn Ullmann.) Andersson did not receive a backstory about Agnes; Agnes' sisters were married with children, but Andersson was uncertain whether Agnes had ever married or became ill at an early age and lived with her mother.

Bergman and Ullmann had a previous romantic relationship, and their daughter Linn Ullmann appears as both Maria's daughter and Anna's daughter in the picture. Another of Bergman's daughters, Lena, also appears as young Maria.

The director initially said that he hoped Mia Farrow would be in the film: "Let's see if that works out. It probably will; why shouldn't it?" However, Farrow was never cast. Kari Sylwan, a novice in Bergman's films, had what would have been Farrow's role.

=== Pre-production ===
Few of Bergman's previous films were shot in colour. Red was particularly sensitive, and cinematographer Sven Nykvist made many photography tests to capture balanced combinations of reds, whites and skin colours. To the disappointment of Swedish Film Institute members, Bergman refused to shoot in their new, expensive studios and filmed on location at Taxinge-Näsby Castle. Since the mansion's interior was dilapidated, the crew was free to paint and decorate as they saw fit.

=== Filming ===
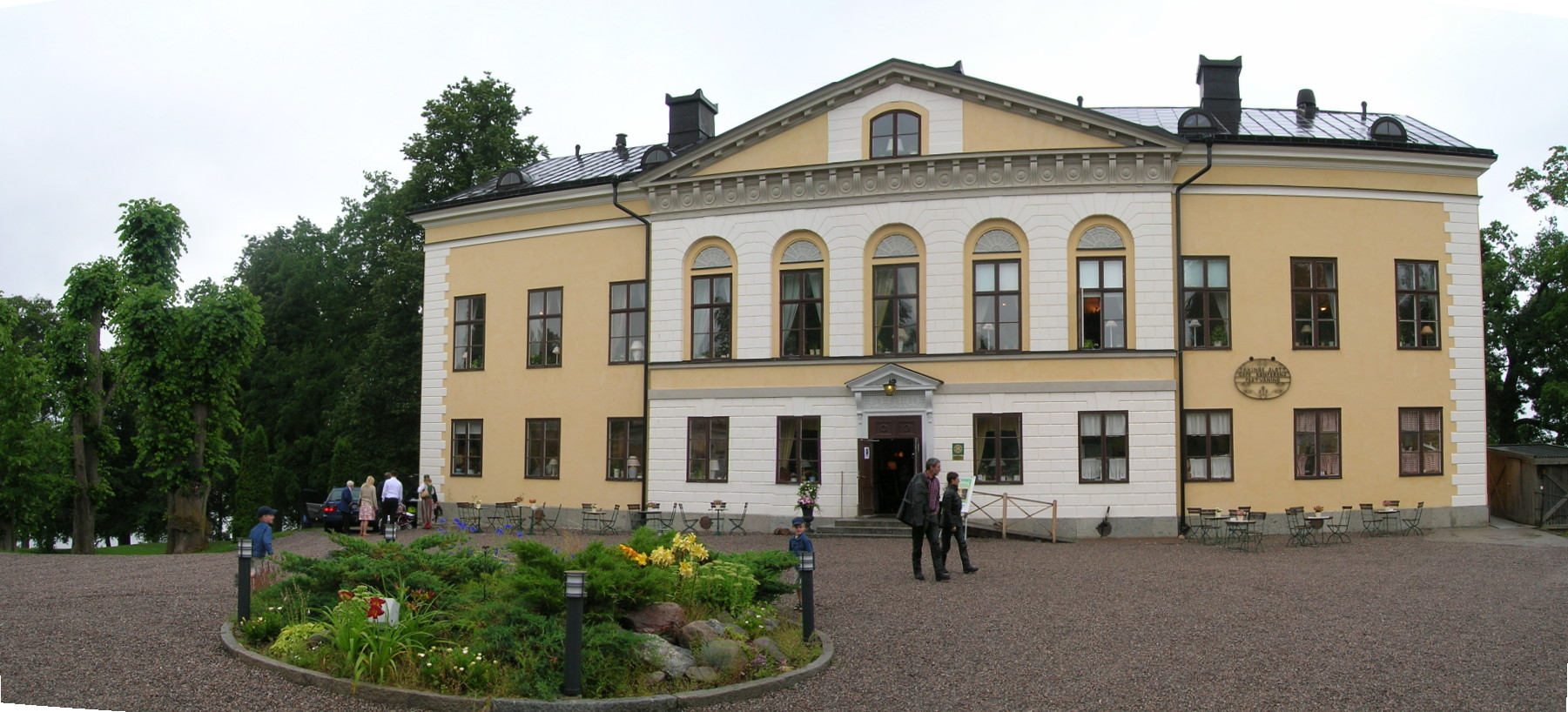
Cries and Whispers was filmed at Taxinge-Näsby Castle, outside Mariefred.

Principal photography took place from 9 September to 30 October 1971. Nykvist used Eastmancolor film, which reduced graininess and would be the most sensitive to colours. The final, outdoor swing scene was shot early in production so the filmmakers could have sunlight before the darker season set in. Ullmann said that every scene was shot in natural light, using large windows for indoor scenes.

Andersson described the on-set mood as light, an antidote to the film's heavy subject matter. She said that although she usually read the screenplay and went to bed early during a production, the filmmakers kept her awake late to enhance her tired, ill appearance. The actress modeled her death scene on the death of her father, and Bergman directed her deep, violent inhalations.

== Themes and interpretations ==
Previous Bergman films had focused on the apparent absence of God, but scholar Julian C. Rice quoted Bergman as saying that he had moved beyond that theme. Rice wrote that Cries and Whispers, following The Silence (1963) and Persona (1966), was based more on psychology and individuation. Academic Eva Rueschmann said that psychoanalysis was an obvious tool with which to study the film, given the subconscious links between its characters.

=== Family and detachment ===
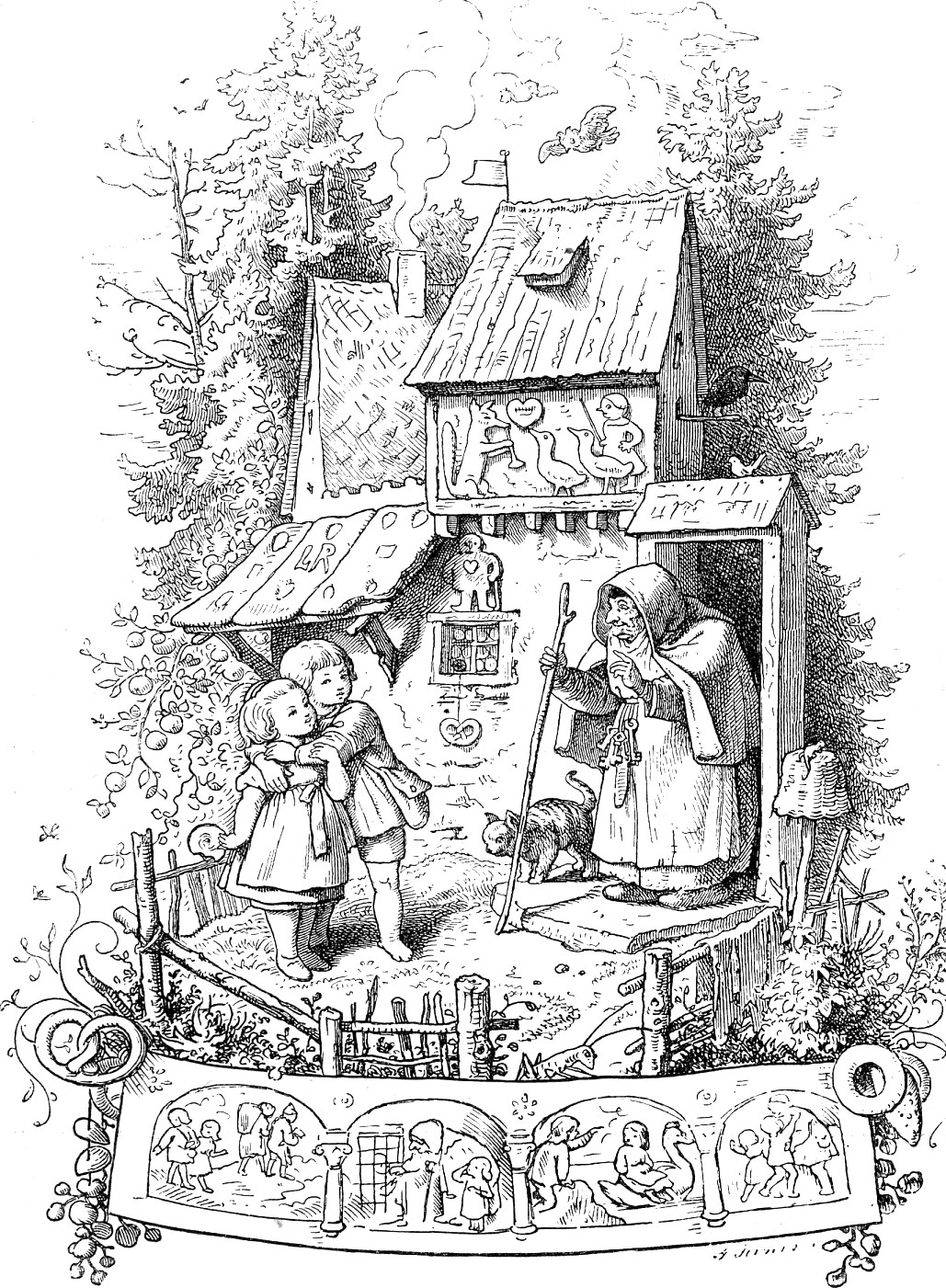
Illustration of "Hansel and Gretel" by Ludwig Richter; like Cries and Whispers, the fairy tale suggests familial abandonment.

Professor Egil Törnqvist examined the film's title. The young Maria whispers to her mother, and Karin and Maria whisper to each other as they bond. According to Törnqvist, "The cries relate to the opposite emotions: anguish, impotence, loneliness". (Note: Bergman claimed the title was derived from a description of the music of Wolfgang Amadeus Mozart. Editor Ken Dancyger alternatively related the title to the sounds one makes when one dies.) Professor Emma Wilson described the family's predicament, with Karin feeling endangered by touch and Maria seeking an "erotic" touch. However, Maria is repelled by Agnes' decay and her dead body. Rueschmann explained Karin's repulsion to touch as a result of her degree of isolation and restraint. The scene where Anna cradles Agnes suggests that touch and sensation are soothing, despite the "opaque" question of their relationship, which may be comparable to sisterhood.

The magic lantern show the sisters enjoy is "Hansel and Gretel", which reveals Agnes' feelings of abandonment and her mother's favouring of Maria; according to Rueschmann, the Brothers Grimm story of sibling unity contrasts the sisters' estrangement. (Note: Bergman recalled receiving his own magic lantern at age 10, from his aunt. In his autobiography, he described it as personally significant, and also depicted a magic lantern in Fanny and Alexander (1982).) Cinema historian P. Adams Sitney wrote that Hansel and Gretel's parents abandoned them in the forest, and Agnes' cancer is the equivalent of the witch in the Brothers Grimm tale. Karin's cutting of her vulva means that her husband will not have sex with her, and the red wine symbolises blood from the womb. Törnqvist wrote that Karin's transfer of blood from her vulva to her mouth means that she will neither have sex nor speak, and preventing communication reinforces loneliness. Sitney wrote that the family is most united when reading Charles Dickens' The Pickwick Papers, which describes "male solidarity and chicanery, threatened by female plots for marriage". According to Frank Gado, detachment returns after Agnes' funeral. Anna is dismissed without warmth or sympathy, and the men deny her monetary rewards despite years of service. Maria also rejects "sentimental appeals" from Karin.

Film scholar Marc Gervais wrote that Cries and Whispers has no definitive solution of whether suffering and death have any meaning, citing the pastor who expresses his own doubts and fears when he eulogises Agnes. Gervais likened this to the protagonist of Bergman's earlier Winter Light, Bergman's own conflicted feelings and his relationship to his father, Erik, a minister of the Church of Sweden. (Note: Earlier with his 1963 film Winter Light, which had a clergyman protagonist struggling with his faith while seeing suffering in the world, Bergman took the rare step of sharing the screenplay with Erik, and boasted that the latter read it three times. Bergman was possibly trying to communicate that he understood Erik, though the name of the character, Ericsson (son of Erik), may indicate the character represents Bergman more than his father.) According to Gervais, the ending presents Bergman's solution: a touch, on certain occasions, can make life worthwhile. Törnqvist compared the ending to that of Bergman's 1957 Wild Strawberries; it "points to the past, to a paradisaic existence in this life, to the communion inherent in childhood that has later been lost".

=== Sex and gender roles ===
Critic Marco Lanzagorta wrote, "Undeniably, Cries and Whispers is a film about the world of women, and is very open in terms of the gender and sexual politics that it portrays". The story fits Bergman's motif of "warring women", seen earlier in The Silence and Persona and later in Autumn Sonata (1978). The film inspired essays about Bergman's view of women. Patricia Erens wrote, "Bergman's women in such films as Persona and Cries and Whispers are not simply objects of abuse, but creatures through whom Bergman can express his own subjective fears, his many frustrations and failures at preserving autonomy of self and control of reality".

Feminists critiqued the film. In Film Quarterly, Joan Mellen acknowledged that Bergman used his female characters as mouthpieces and his women signify "the dilemma of alienated, suffering human beings". In Bergman's films, women and men fail to find answers to their dilemmas; according to Mellen, the men are unanswered or cannot care for anyone but themselves. However, she wrote that Bergman's women fail because of their biology and an inability to move past their sexuality: "Bergman insists that because of their physiology, women are trapped in dry and empty lives within which they wither as the lines begin to appear on their faces". Critic Molly Haskell assigned Cries and Whispers to Bergman's later filmography, which differed from his earlier works in their view of women. Women in his early films lived in harmony with each other and had more-complete lives; Bergman used the women in Cries and Whispers and his later films as "projections of his soul", revealing his "sexual vanity". According to Haskell, Bergman attacked his female characters for the attributes he gave them: Karin's repression and Maria's sexuality.

Academic Laura Hubner agreed with CineAction essayist Varda Burstyn's view that Cries and Whispers depicts the suppression of women, but it does not endorse the suppression and the film opposes patriarchy. Rueschmann traced the emotional estrangement to the women's mother, who reacts to the era's gender roles with "boredom, anger and frustration". According to Rueschmann, her daughters assume (or reject) her position and harm themselves in the process. Agnes' confinement to bed may reflect gender roles and expectations for women about sex, childbirth and death. Author Birgitta Steene disputed what she called Mellen's Marxist feminist analysis, cross-referencing Bergman's realistic and metaphorical films to say that they are not the product of a sexist outlook.

Rueschmann quoted Bergman as saying his "ceaseless fascination with the whole race of women is one of [his] mainsprings. Obviously such an obsession implies ambivalence; it has something compulsive about it". However, he doubted that there was much difference between men and women: "I think that if I had made Cries and Whispers with four men in the leading roles, the story would have been largely the same".

=== Mythical and biblical allusions ===
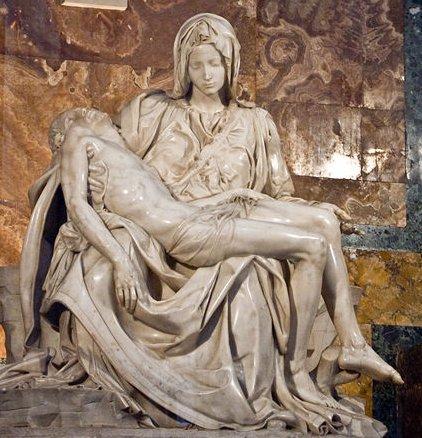
Michelangelo's Pietà; Agnes' death is reminiscent of Jesus' Passion.

Although Agnes' apparent resurrection may reflect Anna's fear (or desire), Emma Wilson wrote that it blurred the line between life and dream and might involve supernatural activity. Bergman explained the scene:

Death is the ultimate loneliness; that is what is so important. Agnes's death has been caught up halfway out into the void. I can't see that there's anything odd about that. Yes, by Christ there is! This situation has never been known, either in reality or at the movies.

Törnqvist advised against a literal reading of Agnes rising from the dead, relating it to the sisters' guilt.

According to Sitney, the statue in the prologue may be Apollo or Orpheus. If the artistic, doomed Agnes matches Orpheus as well as Bergman, Agnes' mother may correspond to Eurydice (representing "the green world"). P. Adams Sitney concluded that Cries and Whispers tells of an "Orphic transformation of terror into art, of the loss of the mother into the musical richness of autumnal color".

The sisters' Aunt Olga uses the magic lantern to narrate "Hansel and Gretel", and Sitney connected this with "the gift of fairy tales—and thereby the psychic-defense machinery for exteriorising infantile and Oedipal terrors". In the folk tale "Cinderella", the wicked stepsisters' bleeding feet as a metaphor for menstruation is magnified by Karin's cutting of her vulva. Her laugh is reminiscent of the wicked witch in "Hansel and Gretel", as she reacts to the damage her sexuality has done.

Törnqvist, seeing that Anna prays for her dead daughter while eating an apple, wrote: "The eating of the apple links Anna, whose dead daughter was undoubtedly an illegitimate child, with the Eve of the Fall, with Original Sin". According to editor Raphael Shargel, Anna seems oblivious to the sacrilege of snacking immediately after worship and that her choice of food is the forbidden fruit.

Törnqvist wrote that Agnes' prolonged pain and death resemble the Passion of Jesus, and Wilson compared the position of Agnes' arms and legs to Jesus' body after his Passion. Gado also saw parallels to the crucifixion of Jesus and flashbacks to Good Friday and a mention of Twelfth Night at the end of the film (which he considered ironic, since Twelfth Night is associated with revelation). The magic-lantern show takes place on Twelfth Night. Sitney, Rueschmann, and Irving Singer described the scene where Anna cradles Agnes as reminiscent of Pietà, with Lanzagorta specifying Michelangelo's Pietà. According to academic Arthur Gibson, the Pietà rite becomes redemption: "Anna is holding in her arms the pain and loneliness and sin of the world caught up in the innocent Divine Sufferer".

== Style ==
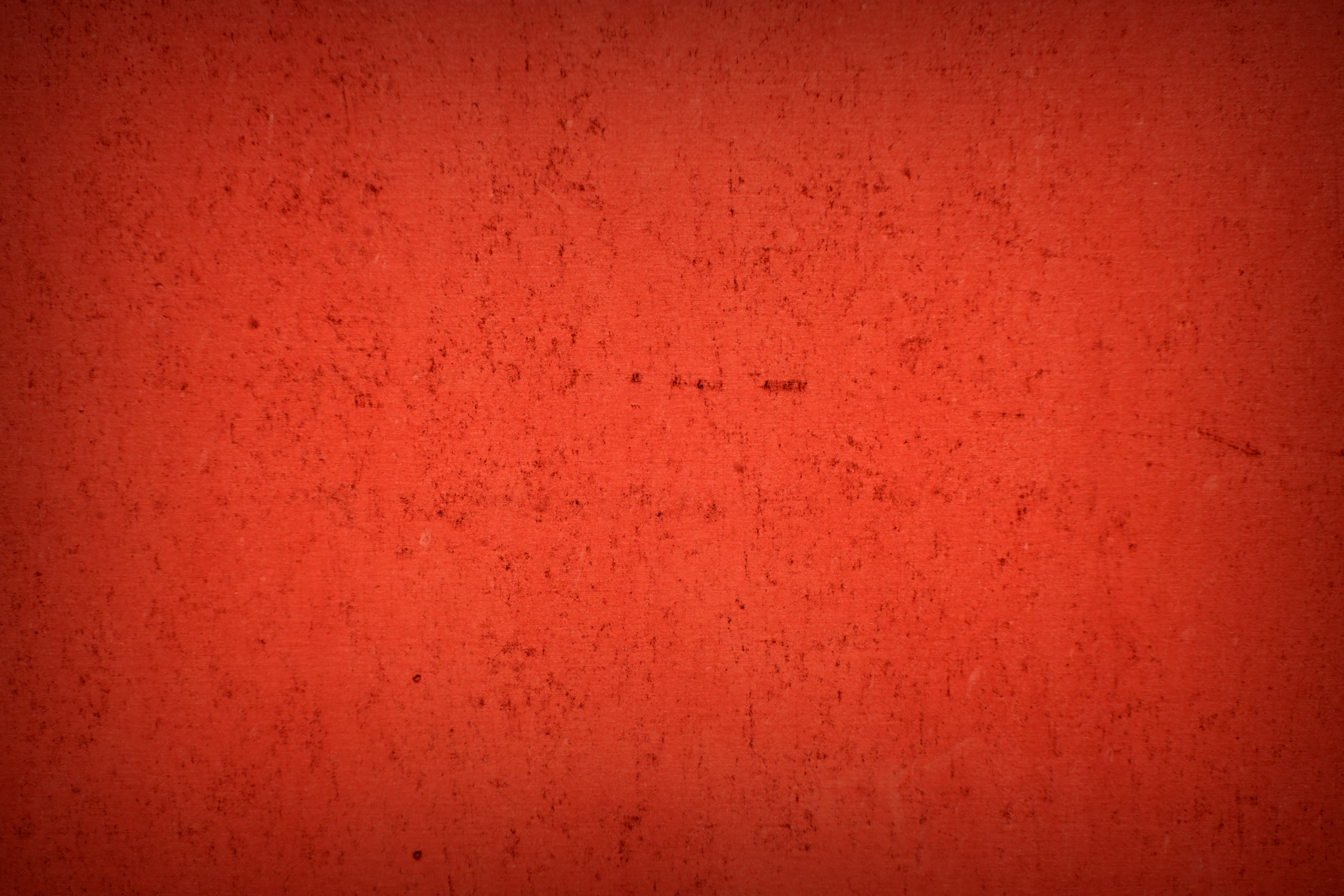
Crimson features extensively in the film's colour scheme.

In 1972, Variety's staff defined "Bergman's lean style" as including a "use of lingering close-ups, fades to red and a soundtrack echoing with the ticking of clocks, the rustle of dresses and the hushed cries of the lost". Critic Richard Brody called Cries and Whispers a period piece in which costumes are prominent. According to Gervais, Bergman had shed his previous austerity in favour of greater aesthetics.

Wilson noted the film's red rooms occupied by women in white, and the "azure, Edenic images of the start are gradually engulfed in crimson". Producer Bruce A. Block described its colour variety as minimal, with an emphasis on "extremely saturated red". According to Richard Armstrong, the Eastmancolor film added "a livid, slightly oneiric quality". Two rooms in the first scene (one where Maria is sleeping and the other being Agnes' room) are joined by the same colours, including "blood red" carpets and drapes and white pillows and nightdresses. Wilson observed that the film has fade-ins and fade-outs in saturated reds. Sitney analyzed Cries and Whispers' colour scheme, writing that there are moves from red with white to red with black to orange and ochre (in the final, autumnal outdoor scene). Blood, seen when Maria's husband injures himself and Karin cuts her vulva, echoes an earlier view of the mother character holding a red book against her dress. Sitney associates this with menstruation and castration.

Wilson described other uses of imagery: statues filling a garden, decorations, sunlight on a clock and a view of Maria revealing the "texture" of her hair. Images follow one another in the five-minute prologue with no spoken words. The close-ups of Maria in the initial scene are childlike. Agnes is seen with an open mouth and moist eyes, depicting her pain. Her memories of her mother are idealised, with the "flourishing greenery of the Edenic garden". Surveying the visuals and Bergman's depiction of social isolation and mourning, critics Christopher Heathcote and Jai Marshall found parallels in the paintings of Edvard Munch.

Mazurka in A minor
The film includes a Chopin mazurka.

Johann Sebastian Bach's sarabande from Cello Suite No. 5 in C minor, performed by Pierre Fournier, is used in the film. Noting its use when the two sisters touch affectionately, critic Robin Wood wrote that it fit Bergman's use of Bach to signify "a possible transcendent wholeness". (Note: Wood connected this usage of the music of Johann Sebastian Bach to The Silence where the Goldberg Variations play, and Autumn Sonata where it is used in a moment of unity, and contrasted it to darker usage in Through a Glass Darkly and Persona.) The score also contains Frédéric Chopin's Mazurka in A minor, Op.17/4, performed by Käbi Laretei. According to musicologist Alexis Luko, Bergman's use of the mazurka when Anna recalls her deceased daughter communicates "a sensory moment of reminiscence".

Sounds are used in other ways, with Anna's dead daughter apparently audible when Anna is near the cradle following Agnes' death. The prologue's bells and clocks are more audible than the natural sounds preceding them; Agnes' struggle to breathe soon joins the clocks' ticking, with editor Ken Dancyger finding "the continuity of time and life".

== Release ==
Every major film-distribution company rejected Cries and Whispers, even when Bergman asked for an advance of only $75,000. Its U.S. rights were bought by Roger Corman of New World Pictures (who favored having the studio branch out into arthouse distribution such as with Amarcord) for $150,000. Corman spent an additional $80,000 on marketing to go with booking the film on the drive-in circuit. According to the producer, the film made a profit of $1 million and was Bergman's biggest success in the U.S. Author Tino Balio reported a U.S. gross of $1.2 million from 803 theatres, and called it Bergman's best-performing film since The Silence. To qualify for the 46th Academy Awards, distributors hurried to premiere Cries and Whispers in Los Angeles County (several months before its Swedish release). It premiered in New York City on 21 December 1972.

The film premiered at the Spegeln theatre in Stockholm on 5 March 1973. Cries and Whispers was later shown out of competition at the 1973 Cannes Film Festival, where Bergman received a strong positive reaction from the audience.

At the 61st Berlin International Film Festival in February 2011 (with Andersson in attendance), Cries and Whispers was screened in the Retrospective section. In 2015, The Criterion Collection released a 2K restoration on Blu-ray in Region A.

== Reception ==
=== Critical reception ===
Before the film's release, estimations of Bergman were lowered by The Rite (1969) and The Touch (1971). In Sweden, Svenska Dagbladet critic Åke Janzon and Dagens Nyheter critic Hanserik Hjerten assessed Cries and Whispers as a poetically rendered psychological study. Critic O. Foss wrote a less-positive review in Fant, calling it "a rhapsody of petrified Bergman themes". The Swedish cultural magazine Ord och Bild considered the film as Bergman's personal view on women and argued that the film was both static and ahistorical.

The film was generally praised in the United States. In The New York Times, Vincent Canby called it a "magnificent, moving, and very mysterious new film". He included the film in his list of the 10 Best Films of 1972. Roger Ebert gave Cries and Whispers four stars (out of four) in his initial review: "We slip lower in our seats, feeling claustrophobia and sexual disquiet, realizing that we have been surrounded by the vision of a film maker who has absolute mastery of his art". and named it "the best film of 1973". Variety staff praised the direction for "a hypnotic impact". In New York, Judith Crist called it "a work of genius— certainly the most complex, the most perceptive and the most humane of Bergman's works to date". François Truffaut made a theatrical comparison, saying that the film "begins like Chekhov's Three Sisters and ends like The Cherry Orchard and in between it's more like Strindberg".

Empire critic David Parkinson gave Cries and Whispers five stars in 2000, writing that the film fit a subset of "character study" at which Bergman was adept. Reviewing the DVD in The New Yorker, Richard Brody said that despite its period setting, the emotional drama resonated with modern audiences. Ebert added it to his "Great Movies" list in 2002, writing that to watch the film "is to touch the extremes of human feeling. It is so personal, so penetrating of privacy, we almost want to look away". That year, James Berardinelli praised Andersson's performance as "so powerful that we feel like intruders watching it. She screams, whimpers, begs, and cries. She craves death and fears it". Berardinelli considered Bergman's use of crimson effective in creating mood; the "natural associations one makes with this color, especially in a story like this, are of sin and blood". Zendry Svärdkrona's 2003 Aftonbladet review called it a masterpiece with wonderful aesthetics but unpleasant subject matter, citing Nykvist and Andersson. Emanuel Levy praised the film's cinematography and the performances of the female leads, calling the result a masterpiece in 2008. Cries and Whispers ranked 154th in the British Film Institute's 2012 Sight & Sound critics' poll of the greatest films ever made. Leonard Maltin gave the film three stars in his 2014 Movie Guide, praising its visuals but cautioning viewers about the large amount of dialogue. Reviewing the Blu-ray in 2015, SF Gate critic Mick LaSalle called Cries and Whispers a "masterpiece" in which the colour red had an important effect. Los Angeles Times critic Andy Klein placed the film "solidly in the existential/emotional angst mode of [Bergman's] best work", called it a triumphant comeback from The Touch, and joked about the resurrection scene: "Yes, technically this is a zombie film". Peter Bradshaw of The Guardian gave the film five stars out of five writing "This film burns, like ice held to the skin."

Don Druker wrote a negative review in the Chicago Reader, criticising a lack of substance, and Time Out's review called the film a "red herring" compared to Bergman's purer psychological dramas.

On the review aggregator website Rotten Tomatoes, Cries and Whispers has an approval rating of 92% based on 36 reviews. The site's critical consensus reads: "Visually stunning and achingly performed, Ingmar Bergman's chamber piece is a visceral rumination on death and sisterhood."

The February 2020 issue of New York Magazine lists Cries and Whispers as among "The Best Movies That Lost Best Picture at the Oscars."

In the Sight and Sound 2022 Sight and Sound poll, Cries and Whispers was placed at 225th place, tying with movies like Star Wars and Intolerance.

=== Accolades ===
Cries and Whispers won three categories at the 9th Guldbagge Awards in Sweden, including Best Film. At Cannes, it won the Technical Grand Prize. It was the fourth foreign-language film ever nominated for the Academy Award for Best Picture, (Note: Cries and Whispers was the fourth foreign-language film in Academy history to receive this nomination, after Grand Illusion, Z, and The Emigrants.) in addition to four other nominations at the 46th Academy Awards; Sven Nykvist won for Best Cinematography.

The film was nominated for, and won, several other awards from critics' associations and festivals. At the 27th British Academy Film Awards, Sven Nykvist was nominated for Best Cinematography and Ingrid Thulin for Best Supporting Actress; at the 30th Golden Globe Awards, it was nominated for Best Foreign Language Film.

Award	Date of ceremony	Category	Recipient(s)	Result	Ref(s)
Academy Awards	2 April 1974	Best Picture	Ingmar Bergman	Nominated	
Academy Awards	2 April 1974	Best Director	Ingmar Bergman	Nominated	
Academy Awards	2 April 1974	Best Original Screenplay	Ingmar Bergman	Nominated	
Academy Awards	2 April 1974	Best Cinematography	Sven Nykvist	Won	
Academy Awards	2 April 1974	Best Costume Design	Marik Vos	Nominated	
Bodil Awards	1974	Best European Film	Ingmar Bergman	Won	
BAFTA Awards	1974	Best Cinematography	Sven Nykvist	Nominated	
BAFTA Awards	1974	Best Supporting Actress	Ingrid Thulin	Nominated	
Cannes Film Festival	10–25 May 1973	Vulcan Technical Grand Prize	Ingmar Bergman	Won	
David di Donatello	1973	Best Foreign Director	Ingmar Bergman	Won	
David di Donatello	1973	Special David	Harriet Andersson	Won	
David di Donatello	1973	Special David	Ingrid Thulin	Won	
David di Donatello	1973	Special David	Liv Ullmann	Won	
David di Donatello	1973	Special David	Kari Sylwan	Won	
Golden Globes	28 January 1973	Best Foreign Language Film	Ingmar Bergman	Nominated	
Guldbagge Awards	29 October 1973	Best Film	Ingmar Bergman	Won	
Guldbagge Awards	29 October 1973	Best Actress	Harriet Andersson	Won	
Guldbagge Awards	29 October 1973	Special Achievement	Sven Nykvist	Won	
Jussi Awards	1975	Best Foreign Director	Ingmar Bergman	Won	
Nastro d'Argento	1974	Best Foreign Film	Ingmar Bergman	Won	
National Board of Review	24 December 1973	Best Director	Ingmar Bergman	Won	
National Board of Review	24 December 1973	Best Foreign Language Film	Ingmar Bergman	Won	
National Board of Review	24 December 1973	Top Foreign Films	Ingmar Bergman	Won	
National Society of Film Critics	29 December 1972	Best Screenplay	Ingmar Bergman	Won	
National Society of Film Critics	29 December 1972	Best Cinematography	Sven Nykvist	Won	
New York Film Critics Circle	3 January 1973	Best Film	Ingmar Bergman	Won	
New York Film Critics Circle	3 January 1973	Best Director	Ingmar Bergman	Won	
New York Film Critics Circle	3 January 1973	Best Screenplay	Ingmar Bergman	Won	
New York Film Critics Circle	3 January 1973	Best Actress	Liv Ullmann	Won	

== Legacy ==
In 1981, PostNord Sverige issued a postage stamp of the scene where Anna holds Agnes as part of a series commemorating the history of Swedish cinema. Woody Allen's later films, including 1978's Interiors and 1986's Hannah and Her Sisters, were influenced by Cries and Whispers, (Note: Rueschmann identified Interiors as Allen's "most candid homage", given the sister characters' relationship to their depressed mother; Hannah and Her Sisters "reprises his focus on three sisters", but pays more attention to the male characters.) as was Margarethe von Trotta's 1979—1988 trilogy: Sisters, or the Balance of Happiness, Marianne and Juliane and Love and Fear. In 2017, Hallwyl Museum exhibited costumes from Cries and Whispers and other Bergman films. Robert Eggers cited it as an influence on his version of Nosferatu.

It has been adapted for the stage. Andrei Șerban directed Cries and Whispers in 2010 for the Hungarian Theatre of Cluj, dramatising Bergman's story and the film's production. Ivo van Hove directed a 2009 adaptation at the Bergman Festival in Sweden's Royal Dramatic Theatre, and in 2011 at the Brooklyn Academy of Music with Chris Nietvelt as Agnes, moving the story to a contemporary setting, reducing the use of red and replacing the film's classical music with modern songs, including Janis Joplin's "Cry Baby".
