= Taxinge-Näsby Castle =

C19 stately home in Stockholm County, Sweden

Coordinates: 59°14′49″N 17°18′33″E

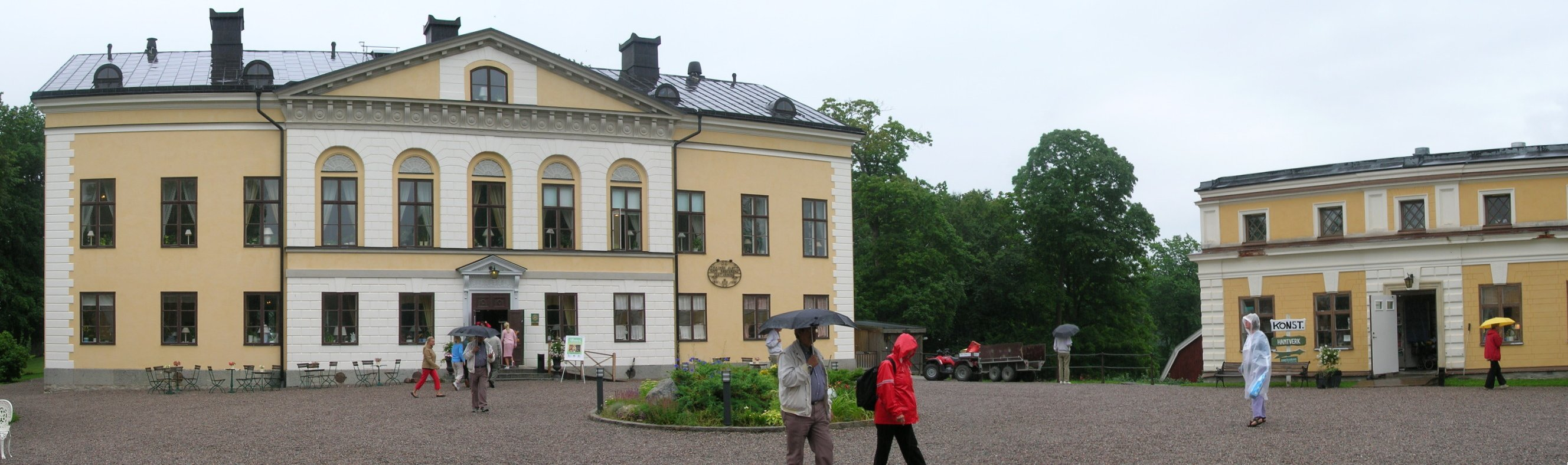
- Interactive map of the Taxinge-Näsby Castle area

General information
- Location: Sweden
- Construction started: 1807
- Completed: 1813

Design and construction
- Architect: Carl Christoffer Gjörwell

Taxinge-Näsby Castle is a stately home in Stockholm County, Sweden. Located near Mariefred, the castle was designed by architect Carl Christoffer Gjörwell, and was built between 1807 and 1813.

== In popular culture ==
Ingmar Bergman's 1972 film Cries and Whispers was filmed in and around Taxinge-Näsby Castle.

The wedding scene from Bille August's 1992 film The Best Intentions was filmed at the castle.

From 2012 to 2022, the baking competition series Hela Sverige bakar was filmed at the Taxinge-Näsby Castle.

== See also ==
- List of castles in Sweden
