= 27th British Academy Film Awards =

1974 film awards ceremony

- Date: 6 March 1974
- Site: Royal Albert Hall
- Hosted by: Eamonn Andrews; Petula Clark

Highlights
- Best Film: Day for Night
- Best Actor: Walter Matthau; Charley Varrick and Pete 'n' Tillie
- Best Actress: Stéphane Audran; The Discreet Charm of the Bourgeoisie and Juste avant la nuit
- Most awards: Day for Night and The Hireling (3)
- Most nominations: The Day of the Jackal and Don't Look Now (7)

The 27th British Academy Film Awards, more commonly known as the BAFTAs, took place on 6 March 1974 at the Royal Albert Hall in London, honouring the best national and foreign films of 1973. Presented by the British Academy of Film and Television Arts, accolades were handed out for the best feature-length film and documentaries of any nationality that were screened at British cinemas in 1973.

François Truffaut's Day for Night won the award for Best Film, Direction (Truffaut) and Supporting Actress (Valentina Cortese). The film received a total of 3 awards, tying with The Hireling as the most awarded film. Walter Matthau received Best Actor for his performances in Charley Varrick and Pete 'n' Tillie. Stéphane Audran took home Best Actress for The Discreet Charm of the Bourgeoisie and Just Before Nightfall, whilst Arthur Lowe won Best Supporting Actor for O Lucky Man!.

The ceremony was hosted by Eamonn Andrews and Petula Clark and awards were presented by Princess Anne, president of the society.

== Winners and nominees ==
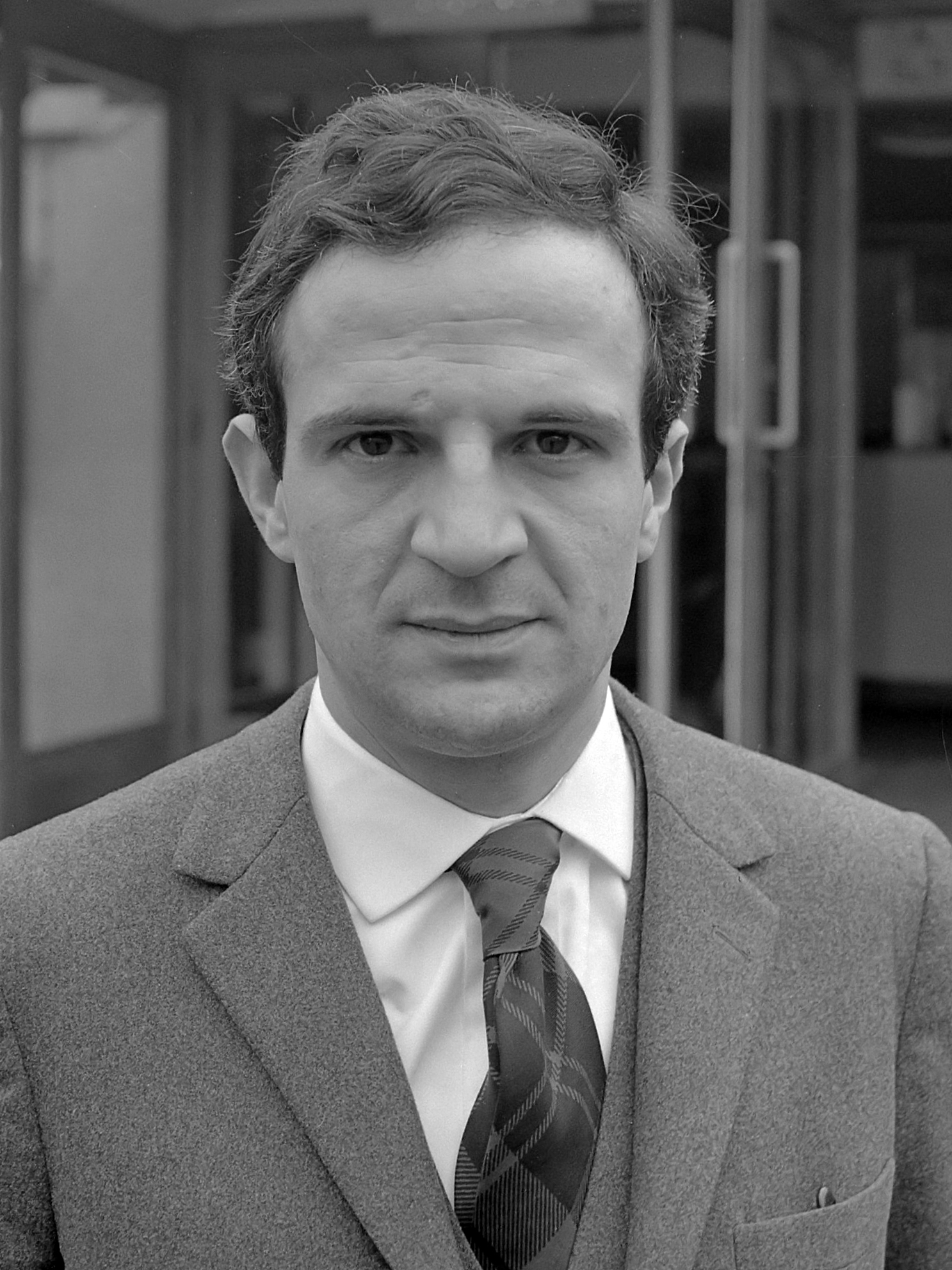
François Truffaut, Best Film and Best Direction winner

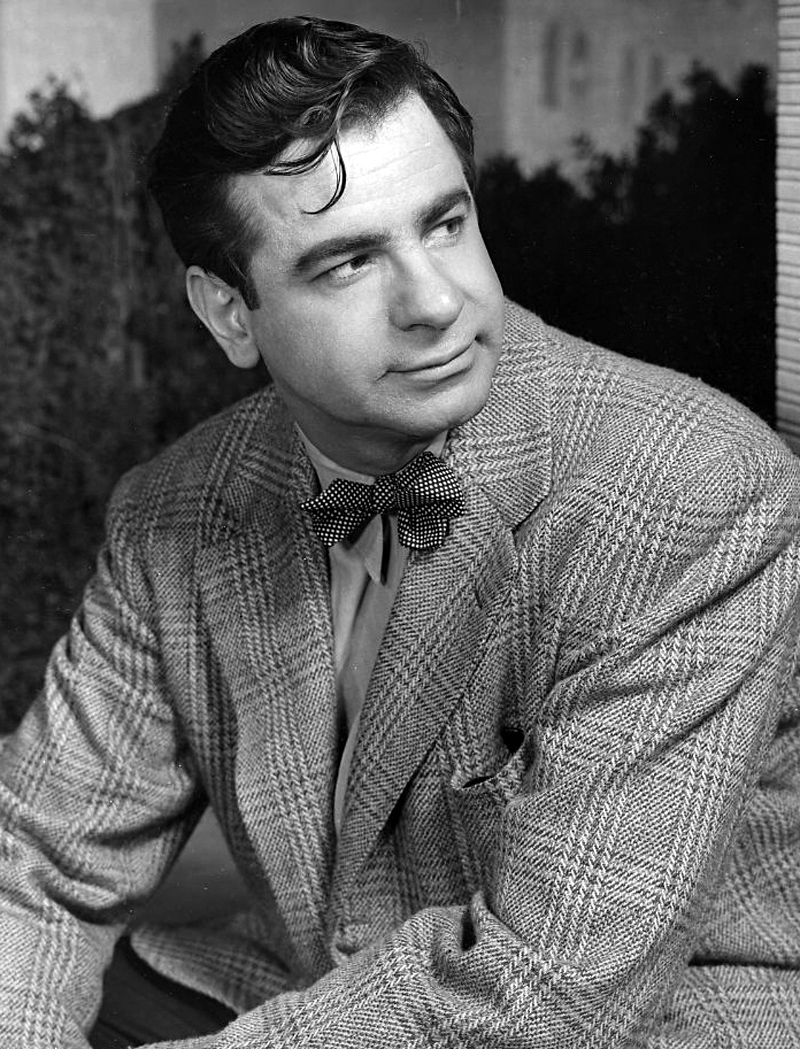
Walter Matthau, Best Actor winner

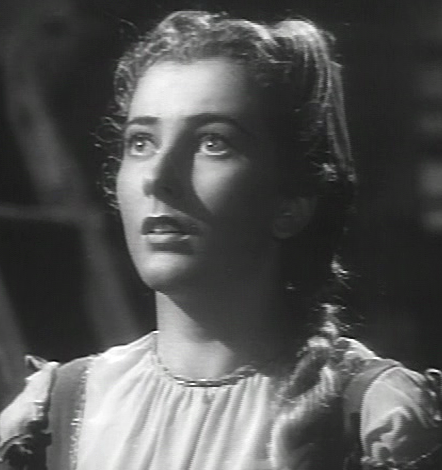
Valentina Cortese, Best Supporting Actress winner

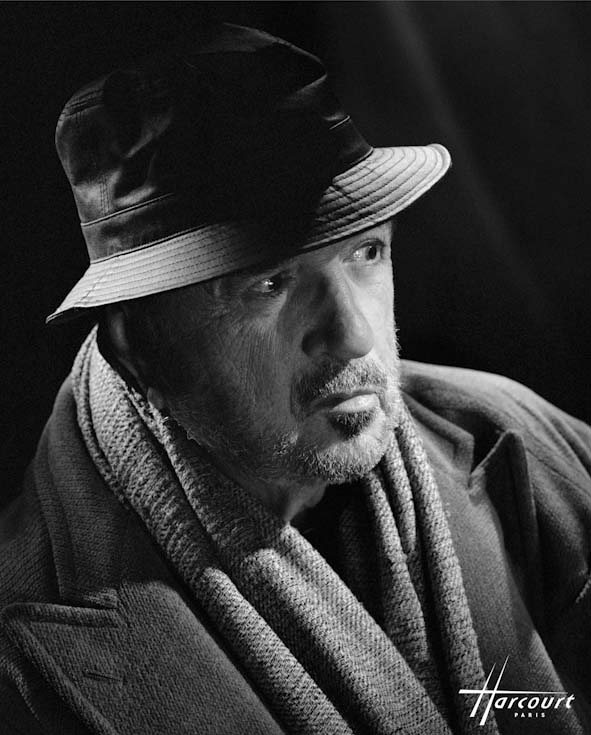
Jean-Claude Carrière, Best Screenplay co-winner

=== BAFTA Fellowship ===
- **David Lean**

=== Awards ===
Winners are listed first and highlighted in boldface.

**Best Film**: **Day for Night – François Truffaut**; The Day of the Jackal – Fred Zinnemann; The Discreet Charm of the Bourgeoisie – Luis Buñuel; Don't Look Now – Nicolas Roeg	**Best Direction**: **François Truffaut – Day for Night**; Fred Zinnemann – The Day of the Jackal; Luis Buñuel – The Discreet Charm of the Bourgeoisie; Nicolas Roeg – Don't Look Now
**Best Actor in a Leading Role**: **Walter Matthau – Charley Varrick as Charley Varrick**; **Walter Matthau – Pete 'n' Tillie as Pete**; Donald Sutherland – Don't Look Now as John Baxter; Donald Sutherland – Steelyard Blues as Jesse Veldini; Laurence Olivier – Sleuth as Andrew Wyke; Marlon Brando – Last Tango in Paris as Paul	**Best Actress in a Leading Role**: **Stéphane Audran – The Discreet Charm of the Bourgeoisie as Alice Senechal**; **Stéphane Audran – Just Before Nightfall as Helene Masson**; Diana Ross – Lady Sings the Blues as Billie Holiday; Glenda Jackson – A Touch of Class as Vickie Allessio; Julie Christie – Don't Look Now as Laura
**Best Actor in a Supporting Role**: **Arthur Lowe – O Lucky Man! as Charlie Johnson**; Denholm Elliott – A Doll's House as Nils Krogstad; Ian Bannen – The Offence as Baxter; Michael Lonsdale – The Day of the Jackal as Deputy Commissioner Claude Lebel	**Best Actress in a Supporting Role**: **Valentina Cortese – Day for Night as Severine**; Delphine Seyrig – The Day of the Jackal as Colette de Montpellier; Ingrid Thulin – Cries and Whispers as Karin; Rosemary Leach – That'll Be the Day as Mary Maclaine
**Best Screenplay**: **The Discreet Charm of the Bourgeoisie – Luis Buñuel and Jean-Claude Carrière**; The Day of the Jackal – Kenneth Ross; Sleuth – Anthony Shaffer; A Touch of Class – Melvin Frank and Jack Rose	**Best Cinematography**: **Don't Look Now – Anthony B. Richmond**; Cries and Whispers – Sven Nykvist; Jesus Christ Superstar – Douglas Slocombe; Sleuth – Oswald Morris; Travels with My Aunt – Douglas Slocombe
**Best Costume Design**: **The Hireling – Phyllis Dalton**; Brother Sun, Sister Moon – Danilo Donati; A Doll's House – Beatrice Dawson; Jesus Christ Superstar – Yvonne Blake	**Best Editing**: **The Day of the Jackal – Ralph Kemplen**; Charley Varrick – Frank Morriss; Don't Look Now – Graeme Clifford; The National Health – Ralph Sheldon
**Best Original Music**: **O Lucky Man! – Alan Price**; Pat Garrett and Billy the Kid – Bob Dylan; Sounder – Taj Mahal; State of Siege – Mikis Theodorakis	**Best Production Design**: **The Hireling – Natasha Kroll**; England Made Me – Tony Woollard; Roma – Danilo Donati; Sleuth – Ken Adam
**Best Sound**: **Jesus Christ Superstar – Les Wiggins, Gordon McCallum and Keith Grant**; The Day of the Jackal – Nicholas Stevenson and Robert Allen; The Discreet Charm of the Bourgeoisie – Guy Villette and Luis Buñuel; Don't Look Now – Rodney Holland, Peter Davies and Bob Jones	**Best Short Animation**: **Tchou Tchou**; Balablok
**Best Documentary**: **Grierson – National Film Board of Canada**; No other nominees	**Best Specialised Film**: **A Man's World**; The Pastfinders; Who Sold You This, Then?; WSP
**John Grierson Award**: **Caring for History**; Artistry in Tureens; The Scene from Melbury House; Without Due Care	**United Nations Award**: **State of Siege – Costa-Gavras**; Jesus Christ Superstar – Norman Jewison; Savages – James Ivory; Sounder – Martin Ritt
**Most Promising Newcomer to Leading Film Roles**: **Peter Egan – The Hireling as Captain Hugh Cantrip**; David Essex – That'll Be the Day as Jim Maclaine; Jim Dale – Adolf Hitler: My Part in His Downfall as Spike Milligan; Kris Kristofferson – Pat Garrett and Billy the Kid as Billy the Kid

== Statistics ==
Films that received multiple nominations
Nominations	Film
7	The Day of the Jackal
7	Don't Look Now
5	The Discreet Charm of the Bourgeoisie
4	Jesus Christ Superstar
4	Sleuth
3	Day for Night
3	The Hireling
2	Charley Varrick
2	Cries and Whispers
2	A Doll's House
2	O Lucky Man!
2	Pat Garrett and Billy the Kid
2	Sounder
2	State of Siege
2	That'll Be the Day
2	A Touch of Class

Films that received multiple awards
Awards	Film
3	Day for Night
3	The Hireling
2	The Discreet Charm of the Bourgeoisie
2	O Lucky Man!

== See also ==
- 46th Academy Awards
- 26th Directors Guild of America Awards
- 31st Golden Globe Awards
- 26th Writers Guild of America Awards
