= 1972 National Society of Film Critics Awards =

Annual US film award ceremony

7th NSFC Awards

December 29, 1972

Best Film:
The Discreet Charm
of the Bourgeoisie

The 7th National Society of Film Critics Awards, given on 29 December 1972, honored the best filmmaking of 1972.

The member critics voting were Hollis Alpert of World, Gary Arnold of The Washington Post, Vincent Canby of The New York Times, Charles Champlin of the Los Angeles Times, Jay Cocks of Time, Judith Crist of New York, David Denby of The Atlantic, Bernard Drew of the Gannett News Service, Roger Ebert of the Chicago Sun-Times, Joseph Gelmis of Newsday, Penelope Gilliatt of The New Yorker, Roger Greenspun of The New York Times, Molly Haskell of The Village Voice, Pauline Kael of The New Yorker, Michael Korda of Glamour, Arthur Knight of Saturday Review, Thomas Meehan of Saturday Review, William S. Pechter of Commentary, Andrew Sarris of The Village Voice, Richard Schickel of Life, Bruce Williamson of Playboy, and Paul D. Zimmerman of Newsweek.

== Winners ==
=== Best Picture ===
- The Discreet Charm of the Bourgeoisie (30 points)

2. The Godfather (28 points)
3. Cries and Whispers (25 points)
4. The Emigrants (13 points)
5. The Sorrow and the Pity (9 points)

=== Best Director ===
- Luis Buñuel – The Discreet Charm of the Bourgeoisie (36 points)

2. Francis Ford Coppola – The Godfather (25 points)
3. Ingmar Bergman – Cries and Whispers (24 points)
4. Jan Troell – The Emigrants (9 points)

=== Best Actor ===
- Al Pacino – The Godfather (28 points)

2. Marlon Brando – The Godfather (21 points)
3. Peter O'Toole – The Ruling Class (13 points)
4. Alec McCowen – Travels with My Aunt (9 points)

=== Best Actress ===
- Cicely Tyson – Sounder (30 points)

2. Harriet Andersson – Cries and Whispers (23 points)
3. Bulle Ogier – La Salamandre and L'amour fou (20 points)
4. Janet Suzman – A Day in the Death of Joe Egg (16 points)
5. Liza Minnelli – Cabaret (9 points)

=== Best Supporting Actor (tie) ===
- Eddie Albert – The Heartbreak Kid (18 points)
- Joel Grey – Cabaret (18 points)

3. Robert Duvall – The Godfather (14 points)
4. Barry Foster – Frenzy (13 points)

=== Best Supporting Actress ===
- Jeannie Berlin – The Heartbreak Kid (26 points)

2. Ida Lupino – Junior Bonner (11 points)
2. Susan Tyrrell – Fat City (11 points)
4. Cybill Shepherd – The Heartbreak Kid (10 points)
5. Harriet Andersson – Cries and Whispers (9 points)

=== Best Screenplay ===
- Ingmar Bergman – Cries and Whispers (27 points)

2. Luis Buñuel and Jean-Claude Carrière – The Discreet Charm of the Bourgeoisie (20 points)
3. John Berger and Alain Tanner – La Salamandre (11 points)
4. Jan Troell and Bengt Forslund – The Emigrants (9 points)
4. Francis Ford Coppola and Mario Puzo – The Godfather (9 points)

=== Best Cinematography ===
- Sven Nykvist – Cries and Whispers (28 points)

2. Vilmos Zsigmond – Images (25 points)
3. Gordon Willis – The Godfather (22 points)
4. Geoffrey Unsworth – Cabaret (11 points)

=== Special awards ===
- Mon Oncle Antoine, "a film released in 1972 which, although not sufficiently recognized by public attendance, has nevertheless been an outstanding cinematic achievement."
- Ivan Passer, "a person working in cinema whose contribution to film art has not yet received due public recognition."
- Robert Kaylor , "a person working in cinema whose contribution to film art has not yet received due public recognition."
