= James Barkley =

American artist, illustrator and professor

- Style: Illustrator

James Barkley is an artist, illustrator, and professor from Pleasantville, New York. He has received a wide range of commissions across many areas; including children's books, book covers, classic books, advertising, television, newspapers, and magazines, and he has created portraits of many famous personalities and political figures.

== Career ==
Barkley is a professor at the Parsons School of Design and the University of Bridgeport. He has lectured at the Pratt Institute, Marymount College, the School of Visual Arts, and the Society of Illustrators, where he has also served as a trustee.

== Works ==
Barkley has created work for the novels of Pearl S. Buck, Stephen King, James Baldwin, and Alex Haley. Among other commissions, he has created artwork for productions of operas The Merry Widow, Madame Butterfly, and La bohème. He has also painted for National Geographic, the United Nations, the U.S. Department of the Interior, the National Park Service, the U.S. Postal Service, NBC, IBM, General Foods, PepsiCo, Sony, Columbia Pictures, Esquire, and McCall's.

His exhibition credits include the Norman Rockwell Museum and the Smithsonian Institution.

He is credited with illustrating the book covers for A Torrent of Faces, The CTZ Paradigm, Ladis and the Ant, and Sounder, by William H. Armstrong.

Barkley is the cover illustrator of The O'Jays Ship Ahoy album

== Interests ==
Outside of Barkley's work as an artist, he was also the co-founder of the Spartan Football Club, a non-profit organization, in New York.
