= The Discreet Charm of the Bourgeoisie =

1972 film by Luis Buñuel

- Theatrical release poster
- French: Le Charme discret de la bourgeoisie
- Directed by: Luis Buñuel
- Written by: Luis Buñuel; Jean-Claude Carrière (Note: Collaboration)
- Produced by: Serge Silberman
- Starring: Fernando Rey; Paul Frankeur; Delphine Seyrig; Bulle Ogier; Stéphane Audran; Jean-Pierre Cassel; Julien Bertheau; Milena Vukotic; Maria Gabriella Maione; Claude Piéplu; Muni; François Maistre; Pierre Maguelon; Maxence Mailfort
- Cinematography: Edmond Richard
- Edited by: Hélène Plemiannikov
- Production company: Greenwich Film Productions
- Distributed by: 20th Century Fox
- Release dates: 15 September 1972 (France); 13 April 1973 (Italy); 21 April 1973 (Spain)
- Running time: 101 minutes
- Countries: France; Italy; Spain
- Languages: French; Italian; Spanish
- Budget: $800,000
- Box office: $304,129

The Discreet Charm of the Bourgeoisie (French: Le Charme discret de la bourgeoisie) is a 1972 surrealist satirical dark comedy film directed by Luis Buñuel, who wrote the screenplay in collaboration with Jean-Claude Carrière. The narrative concerns a group of French bourgeoisie and the fictional South American country of Miranda's ambassador to France attempting—despite continual interruptions—to dine together. The film stars Fernando Rey, Paul Frankeur, Delphine Seyrig, Bulle Ogier, Stéphane Audran, Jean-Pierre Cassel, Julien Bertheau and Milena Vukotic.

The film consists of several thematically linked scenes: five gatherings of a group of bourgeois friends, and the four dreams of different characters. The beginning of the film focuses on the gatherings, while the latter part focuses on the dreams, but both are intertwined. There are also scenes involving other characters, including two in which a Maoist terrorist from Miranda attempts to assassinate the ambassador. The film's world is not logical, and the bizarre events are accepted by the characters.

The Discreet Charm of the Bourgeoisie was a critical and commercial success. It won the Academy Award for Best Foreign Language Film and BAFTA Awards for Best Actress in a Leading Role (Audran) and Best Original Screenplay (Buñuel and Carrière).

== Plot ==
A French bourgeois couple, François and Simone Thévenot, accompany François's colleague Don Rafael Acosta (the ambassador from the South American nation of Miranda) and Simone's sister Florence to the house of the Sénéchals, the hosts of a dinner party. Alice Sénéchal is surprised to see them, explaining that she expected them the following evening and has no dinner prepared. The would-be guests then invite Alice to join them for dinner at a nearby inn. There, a waitress informs them that the restaurant is under new management. There are no diners inside, and the party hurriedly departs shortly after discovering a vigil for the manager, who died a few hours earlier, in an adjoining room.

Acosta, François, and Alice's husband Henri meet the next day at the Mirandan embassy to discuss the proceeds of a large cocaine deal. Acosta sees a young woman selling clockwork-animal toys outside; he shoots one of the toys with a rifle and the woman runs off. He explains that she is part of a Maoist Mirandan terrorist group that has been targeting him for months.

Two days later, the friends arrive at the Sénéchals' for lunch, but Henri and Alice escape to the garden to have sex instead of joining them. Acosta deduces that the Sénéchals know the police are coming and have fled to avoid arrest for their involvement in drug trafficking, prompting the group to leave in a panic.

When the Sénéchals return from the garden to find the rest of the group gone, they meet a bishop who has donned their gardener's clothing. They throw him out, but when he returns wearing his bishop's robes, they embrace him with deference. The bishop asks to work for them as their gardener. He tells them that when he was a child, his parents were poisoned with arsenic and the culprit was never apprehended.

The women visit a teahouse, where a soldier tells them about his childhood. Following his mother's death, his cold-hearted father sent him to military school. The ghost of the soldier's mother informed him that the man was not his real father but his father's killer; they had dueled over her. She asks her son to poison the culprit, and he complies.

Simone meets Acosta, with whom she is having an affair, at his apartment. They retreat to his bedroom to have sex but are interrupted by a visit from François, whereupon she makes a convenient excuse and leaves with him. Acosta is then visited by the terrorist, who has come to kill him. He ambushes and chastises her, and tells her to leave after she refuses his sexual advances. As she leaves, he signals to agents waiting across the street, who capture her.

The group convenes at the Sénéchals' for dinner, but are interrupted by the arrival of an army regiment, who join the dinner only to be called away for alarmingly close maneuvers. The colonel invites them to his house in return; Henri dreams that the colonel's dining room is a stage set in a theatrical performance where the audience is angry with the actors for not knowing their lines. François dreams that, at the dinner, the colonel badgers Acosta about the political situation in Miranda, culminating in Acosta shooting the colonel.

The bishop is called away from gardening to give absolution to a dying gardener, who confesses to poisoning his former employers due to their mistreatment of him. Realizing that the employers were his parents, the bishop finishes giving the gardener absolution before fatally shooting him with a shotgun.

The Sénéchals, the Thévenots, and Acosta are arrested for drug trafficking. The police chief dreams that the ghost of a former inspector killed in retribution for torturing a student protestor releases the traffickers. He wakes up from the dream to learn that the Interior Minister has ordered them to be released. Acosta dreams that they return to the Sénéchals' for dinner but are shot by a rival gang of drug traffickers from Marseille. After waking up, he walks to the kitchen and sloppily eats leftovers stored in the refrigerator.

A recurring scene of the six people walking silently and purposefully on an isolated country road is also the final sequence.

== Cast ==
- Fernando Rey as Rafael Acosta
- Paul Frankeur as François Thévenot
- Delphine Seyrig as Simone Thévenot
- Bulle Ogier as Florence Thévenot
- Stéphane Audran as Alice Sénéchal
- Jean-Pierre Cassel as Henri Sénéchal
- Julien Bertheau as Monsignor Dufour, the Bishop
- Milena Vukotic as Inès, the Sénéchals' maid
- Maria Gabriella Maione as the female terrorist
- Claude Piéplu as the Colonel
- Muni as the peasant
- Pierre Maguelon as Brigadier Sanglant
- François Maistre as Commissaire Delecluze
- Michel Piccoli as the Minister of the Interior
- Christian Baltauss as Lt. Hubert de Rochcahin
- Georges Douking as the gardener
- Alix Mahieux as the Colonel's wife
- Bernard Musson as the teahouse waiter
- Maxence Mailfort as the dreaming Sergeant
- Jacques Rispal as the Gendarme
- Amparo Soler Leal as Rochcahin's mother

== Production ==
=== Pre-production ===
After having announced that Tristana (1970) would be his last film because he felt he was repeating himself, Buñuel met with screenwriter Jean-Claude Carrière and discussed the topic of repetition. Shortly afterwards, Buñuel met with film producer Serge Silberman, who told him an anecdote about having forgotten about a dinner party and being surprised to see six hungry friends show up at his front door. Buñuel was suddenly inspired, and Silberman agreed to give him a $2,000 advance to write a new script with Carrière. They wrote the first draft in three weeks and finished the fifth draft by the summer of 1971, titled Bourgeois Enchantment. Silberman had secured enough money for the film in April 1972, whereupon Buñuel began pre-production.

Buñuel cast many actors whom he had worked with in the past, such as Fernando Rey and Michel Piccoli, and adjusted their roles to their personalities. He had more difficulty casting the female leads, and allowed Delphine Seyrig and Stéphane Audran to choose which parts they would like to play before changing the script to better suit them. When Jean-Pierre Cassel auditioned for his role, he was surprised when Buñuel cast him after simply glancing at him once.

=== Filming and editing ===
Filming began on 15 May 1972, and lasted for two months on an $800,000 budget (equivalent to $6,157,518 in 2025). In his usual shooting style, Buñuel shot few takes and often edited the film in camera and during production; Buñuel and Silberman had a long-running and humorous argument as to whether Buñuel took one day or one and a half days to edit his films.

On the advice of Silberman, Buñuel used video playback monitors on the set for the first time in his career. This resulted in a vastly different style than any of his previous films, including extensive use of zooms and tracking shots instead of his usual close-ups and static camera framing. It also resulted in Buñuel's being more comfortable on set and limiting his already minimal direction to technical and physical instructions. This frustrated Cassel, who had never worked with Buñuel before, until Rey explained that this was Buñuel's usual style and that since they were playing aristocrats their movements and physical appearance were more important than their inner motivation.

Buñuel once joked that whenever he needed an extra scene he simply filmed one of his own dreams. The Discreet Charm of the Bourgeoisie includes three of Buñuel's recurring dreams: a dream of being on stage and forgetting his lines, a dream of meeting his dead cousin in the street and following him into a house full of cobwebs, and a dream of waking up to see his dead parents staring at him.

== Reception ==
=== Critical response ===
The Discreet Charm of the Bourgeoisie was a critical and commercial success in both Europe and the United States. Roger Ebert called it a comedy, but noted that Buñuel's comedies were "more like a dig in the ribs, sly and painful." Robert Benayoun described it as "perhaps [Buñuel's] most direct and most 'public' film". Vincent Canby wrote: “In addition to being extraordinarily funny and perfectly acted, The Discreet Charm moves with the breathtaking speed and self-assurance that only a man of Buñuel’s experience can achieve without resorting to awkward ellipsis.” Buñuel later said that he was disappointed with most critics' analysis of the film; he also disliked the film's promotional poster, depicting a pair of lips with legs and a bowler hat.

Buñuel and Silberman travelled to the United States in late 1972 to promote the film. Buñuel did not attend his own press screening in Los Angeles and told a Newsweek reporter that his favorite characters in the film were the cockroaches which appear in one of the dream sequences. While visiting Los Angeles, Buñuel, Carrière and Silberman were invited to a lunch party by Buñuel's old friend George Cukor where other guests included Alfred Hitchcock, Billy Wilder, George Stevens, Rouben Mamoulian, John Ford, William Wyler, Robert Mulligan and Robert Wise. Fritz Lang, one of Buñuel's favorite directors, was unable to attend, but Buñuel visited him the following day and received an autographed photo.

On the review aggregator website Rotten Tomatoes, the film holds an approval rating of 98% based on 60 reviews, with an average rating of 8.5/10. The website's consensus reads, "An intoxicating dose of the director's signature surrealist style, The Discreet Charm of the Bourgeoisie represents Buñuel at his most accessible." Metacritic, which uses a weighted average, assigned the film a score of 93 out of 100, based on 12 critics, indicating "universal acclaim".

=== Accolades ===
Award	Year	Category	Nominee	Result
Academy Awards	1973	Best Foreign Language Film	France	Won
Academy Awards	1973	Best Original Screenplay	Luis Buñuel and Jean-Claude Carrière	Nominated
BAFTA Awards	1974	Best Film	The Discreet Charm of the Bourgeoisie	Nominated
BAFTA Awards	1974	Best Direction	Luis Buñuel	Nominated
BAFTA Awards	1974	Best Actress	Stéphane Audran	Won
BAFTA Awards	1974	Best Original Screenplay	Luis Buñuel, Jean-Claude Carrière	Won
BAFTA Awards	1974	Best Sound	Luis Buñuel, Guy Villette	Nominated
French Syndicate of Cinema Critics	1973	Prix Méliès	The Discreet Charm of the Bourgeoisie	Won
Golden Globe Awards	1973	Best Foreign-Language Film	The Discreet Charm of the Bourgeoisie	Nominated
Nastro d'Argento	1974	Best Foreign Director	Luis Buñuel	Nominated
National Board of Review Awards	1972	Top Foreign Language Films	The Discreet Charm of the Bourgeoisie	Won
National Society of Film Critics Awards	1972	Best Film	The Discreet Charm of the Bourgeoisie	Won
National Society of Film Critics Awards	1972	Best Director	Luis Buñuel	Won
National Society of Film Critics Awards	1972	Best Screenplay	Luis Buñuel, Jean-Claude Carrière	Nominated
New York Film Critics Circle Awards	1973	Best Director	Luis Buñuel	Nominated
New York Film Critics Circle Awards	1973	Best Screenplay	Luis Buñuel, Jean-Claude Carrière	Nominated

=== Academy Award win ===
Silberman decided not to wait until May 1973 to premiere the film at the Cannes Film Festival, and instead released it in the autumn of 1972 to make it eligible for the Academy Award for Best Foreign Language Film. Buñuel was famously indifferent to awards and jokingly told a reporter that he had already paid a bribe of $25,000 in order to win the Oscar. Silberman accepted the award on Buñuel's behalf at the ceremony. At the academy's request, Buñuel posed with the Oscar statuette for a photograph, but wore a wig and oversized sunglasses.

== Home media ==
In January 2021, The Discreet Charm of the Bourgeoisie was released by The Criterion Collection as part of a Buñuel box set with its successors The Phantom of Liberty (1974) and That Obscure Object of Desire (1977).

In June 2022, The Discreet Charm of the Bourgeoisie received a 4K digital restoration from StudioCanal for its 50th anniversary. The restoration was issued on Blu-ray and DVD.

On 23 March 2018, Panorama released the film on Blu-ray in Hong Kong.

== Adaptations ==
In October 2014, Stephen Sondheim and David Ives announced that they were developing a new musical provisionally titled Square One, with a plot inspired by both The Discreet Charm of the Bourgeoisie and Buñuel's 1962 film The Exterminating Angel, projected to open in 2017. Production ceased at some point, but Sondheim held a September 2021 reading. Following Sondheim's death that November, Ives announced that the musical, retitled Here We Are, would have a limited engagement world premiere in September 2023 at The Shed in Manhattan.

== See also ==
- Bourgeois personality
- List of fictional countries
- List of French submissions for the Academy Award for Best Foreign Language Film
- List of submissions to the 45th Academy Awards for Best Foreign Language Film
- Mr. Robot
