= William H. Armstrong (author) =

American children's writer (1911–1999)

- Born: William Howard Armstrong; September 14, 1911; Lexington, Virginia, US
- Died: April 11, 1999 (age 87); Kent, Connecticut, US
- Education: Hampden-Sydney College
- Occupations: Writer; educator; history teacher
- Writing career
- Language: English
- Genres: Children's historical novels, study guides
- Notable work: Sounder
- Notable awards: Newbery Medal; 1970

William Howard Armstrong (September 14, 1911 – April 11, 1999) was an American writer of children's literature and educator, best known for his 1969 novel Sounder, which won the Newbery Medal.

== Early life and education ==
Armstrong was born in Lexington, Virginia, in 1911, the third child born to Howard Gratton Armstrong, a farmer, and his wife, Ida Morris Armstrong. He had a difficult time in school, being a small child with asthma and glasses.

While his father taught him to work hard, his mother taught Armstrong to love stories. "No one told me the Bible was not for young readers, so I found some exciting stories in it," Armstrong said. "Not until years later did I understand why I liked the Bible stories so much. It was because everything that could possibly be omitted [left out] was omitted. There was no description of David so I could be like David..." Armstrong later used the art of omission in his own writing of Sounder which he wrote based on an account told around his family's kitchen table in Virginia. One story in particular, told by an elderly black man about Argus, the faithful dog of Odysseus, fascinated him; the dog recognized his master when he returned home after being away for twenty long years. This story stayed with him throughout his life and ultimately was the inspiration for his award-winning children's book, Sounder.

After growing up on a farm near Lexington, Armstrong graduated from the Augusta Military Academy. He attended Hampden-Sydney College, where he wrote for the college newspaper and edited its literary magazine. Armstrong graduated cum laude in 1936, then continued his higher education with graduate work at the University of Virginia.

== Career ==
Armstrong farmed in Connecticut near the Housatonic River, where he learned to be a carpenter and a stonemason. In 1945, he became a history master at Kent School in Kent, Connecticut, where he remained for 52 years, teaching general studies, classics, and ancient history to generations of ninth grade students.

In 1956, at the request of his school headmaster, he published his first book, a study guide called Study Is Hard Work. Armstrong followed this title with numerous other self-help books, and in 1963 he was awarded the National School Bell Award of the National Association of School Administrators for distinguished service in the interpretation of education.

In 1969, Armstrong published his masterpiece, an eight-chapter novel titled Sounder about an African-American sharecropping family. Praised by critics, Sounder won the John Newbery Medal and the Lewis Carroll Shelf Award in 1970, and was adapted into a major motion picture in 1972 starring Paul Winfield and Cicely Tyson.

Among his other novels are The Sour Land, a sequel to Sounder, though not labeled as such, The Mills of God and The MacLeod Place, the story of a multi-generational family farm displaced by the construction of the Blue Ridge Parkway.

He continued to be prolific in his writing output, mainly publishing books with historical or biblical main characters, such as Hadassah: Esther the Orphan Queen (1972) and The Education of Abraham Lincoln (1974).

== Death and legacy ==
He died in 1999 at his home in Kent, Connecticut at the age of 87.

His Newbery Medal currently resides in the William Armstrong children's book section at Bortz Library at Armstrong's alma mater Hampden-Sydney College. Hampden-Sydney College awarded Armstrong an honorary Doctor of Letters in 1986.

== Works ==
- Study Is Hard Work (1956)
- Through Troubled Waters (1957)
- 87 ways to Help Your Child in School (1961)
- Tools of Thinking (1968)
- Word Power in 5 Easy Lessons (1969)
- Peoples of the Ancient World (1969)
- Sounder (1969)
- Barefoot in the Grass, the story of Grandma Moses (1970)
- Sour Land (1971)
- The MacLeod Place (1972)
- Hadassah: Esther the Orphan Queen (1972)
- My Animals (1973)
- The Mills of God (1973)
- The Education of Abraham Lincoln (1974)
- JoAnna's Miracle (1978)
- Tawny and Dingo (1978)
- Warrior in Two Camps (1978)
- Study Tactics (1983)
- Trueno (1996)
