= 22nd Writers Guild of America Awards =

22nd WGA Awards
- Date: 1970
- Organized by: Writers Guild of America, East and the Writers Guild of America, West

The 22nd Writers Guild of America Awards honored the best film writers and television writers of 1969. Winners were announced in 1970.

== Winners and nominees ==
=== Film ===
Winners are listed first highlighted in boldface.

**Best Drama Written Directly for the Screen**: **Butch Cassidy and the Sundance Kid, Written by William Goldman**; Alice's Restaurant, Written by Venable Herndon, and Arthur Penn; Downhill Racer, Written by James Salter; Easy Rider, Written by Peter Fonda, Dennis Hopper, and Terry Southern; Me, Natalie, Written by A. Martin Zweiback; story by Stanley Shaphiro, and A. Martin Zweiback	**Best Comedy Written Directly for the Screen**: **Bob & Carol & Ted & Alice, Written by Paul Mazursky, and Larry Tucker**; If It's Tuesday, This Must Be Belgium, Written by David Shaw; Popi, Written by Tina Pine, and Lester Pine; Support Your Local Sheriff!, Written by William Bowers; Take the Money and Run, Screenplay by Woody Allen, and Mickey Rose
**Best Drama Adapted from Another Medium**: **Midnight Cowboy, Screenplay by Waldo Salt; based on the novel by James Leo Herlily**; Anne of the Thousand Days, Screenplay by John Hale, and Bridget Boland; Based on the play by Maxwell Anderson; The Prime of Miss Jean Brodie, Screenplay by Jay Presson Allen; based on the novel by Muriel Spark; They Shoot Horses, Don't They?, Screenplay by James Poe, Robert E. Thompson; based on the novel by Horace McCoy; True Grit, Screenplay by Marguerite Roberts; based on the novel by Charles Portis	**Best Comedy Adapted from Another Medium**: **Goodbye, Columbus, Screenplay by Arnold Schulman; based on the novel by Philip Roth**; Cactus Flower, Screenplay by I.A.L. Diamond; based on the play by Pierre Barillet and Jean-Pierre Gredy; Gaily, Gaily, Screenplay by Abram S. Ginnes; based on the novel by Ben Hecht; John and Mary, Screenplay by John Mortimer; based on the novel by Mervyn Jones; The Reivers, Screenplay by Irving Ravetch, and Harriet Frank; based on the novel by William Faulkner

=== Television ===
**Episodic Comedy**: **"Funny Boy" – Room 222 (ABC) – Allan Burns**; "Ice Station Siegfried" – Get Smart (CBS) – Arne Sultan, and Chris Hayward; "The Apes of Rath" – Get Smart (CBS) – Lloyd Turner, and Gordon Mitchell; "Little Girls Are Sugar & Spice, and Not Always Nice!" – My World and Welcome to It (NBC) – Rick Mittleman; "Growing, Growing, Grown" – The Bill Cosby Show (NBC) – Kenny Solms, and Gail Parent; "The Honeymooners: Play It Again, Norton – The Jackie Gleason Show (CBS) – Walter Stone, Rod Parker, and Robert Hilliard	**Episodic Drama**: **"An Elephant in a Cigar Box" – Judd for the Defense (ABC) – Robert Lewin**; "To Hell with Babe Ruth" – Hawaii Five-O (CBS) – Anthony Lawrence; "Keep the Faith, Baby" – Mod Squad (ABC) – Harve Bennett; "In This Corner - Sol Alpert" – Mod Squad (ABC) – Rita Lankin, and Harve Bennett; "Black Jade" – The Virginian (NBC) – Herb Meadow; "D.C. Fontana" – Then Came Bronson (NBC) – D.C. Fontana

=== Special awards ===
Laurel Award for Screenwriting Achievement

**Dalton Trumbo**

Valentine Davies Award

**Richard Murphy**

Morgan Cox Award

**Barry Trivers**
