= Cactus Flower =

Cactus Flower may refer to:

- Cactus Flower, the flower(s) that grow on a cactus
- Cactus Flower (play), a farce by Abe Burrows
- Cactus Flower (film), a 1969 comedy film directed by Gene Saks adapted from the play
- Cactus Flower (2017 film), a 2017 drama film directed by Hala Elkoussey
