= Avanti! =

1972 film by Billy Wilder

- Theatrical release poster by Sandy Kossin
- Directed by: Billy Wilder
- Screenplay by: Billy Wilder; I. A. L. Diamond; Uncredited: Luciano Vincenzoni
- Based on: Avanti! (1968 play) by Samuel A. Taylor
- Produced by: Billy Wilder; Alberto Grimaldi; Jack Lemmon
- Starring: Jack Lemmon; Juliet Mills; Clive Revill
- Cinematography: Luigi Kuveiller
- Edited by: Ralph E. Winters
- Music by: Carlo Rustichelli
- Production companies: Phalanx Productions; Jalem Productions; The Mirisch Corporation; Produzioni Europee Associati
- Distributed by: United Artists
- Release dates: December 17, 1972 (U.S.); March 31, 1973 (Italy)
- Running time: 140 minutes
- Countries: United States; Italy
- Languages: English; Italian
- Budget: $2.75 million
- Box office: $1.5 million (rentals)

Avanti! (Italian interjection – 'come in!' (Note: Avanti could mean "come in!", "enter!", or "after you!" as interjections. It can also be utilized as "forward", "ahead", and "onward" as adverbs. Context is crucial, however, because "avanti" is capable of being phrased or conjugated antithetically, such as to say "let's go!" or that something occurred "way back when". This lends itself to the tongue-in-cheek humor of the title and film.); Italian: Che cosa è successo tra mio padre e tua madre?, lit. 'What Happened Between My Father and Your Mother?') is a 1972 comedy film produced and directed by Billy Wilder, and starring Jack Lemmon and Juliet Mills. The screenplay by Wilder and I. A. L. Diamond is based on Samuel A. Taylor's play, which had a short run for the 1968 Broadway season. The film follows an American businessman attempting to recover the body of his father from Italy, only to learn his seemingly-straightlaced father died alongside his mistress.

The film was an international co-production between the United States and Italy, and was co-produced by Wilder and Diamond's Phalanx Productions and Lemmon's Jalem Productions. Filming took place at various locations in Campania in Southern Italy, including the island of Ischia, Sorrento, Capri, and the Amalfi Coast.

Avanti was released in the United States by United Artists on December 17, 1972. Lemmon's performance earned him a Golden Globe Award for Best Actor in a Motion Picture – Musical or Comedy—who set a record by winning his third Golden Globe in this particular category. (Note: Jack Lemmon previously won Comedy Actor Golden Globes for Some Like It Hot (1959) and The Apartment (1960). (Coincidentally, both of them also directed by Billy Wilder and co-written with I. A. L. Diamond.) Lemmon, who also received others including the prestigious Cecil B. DeMille Award, is currently tied for the most wins in this category alongside Robin Williams.) The film was nominated in five other categories, including Best Motion Picture – Musical or Comedy, Best Director (Wilder), and Best Actress – Motion Picture Comedy or Musical (Mills).

== Plot ==
Wendell Armbruster Jr. embarks on a journey to Ischia to claim his father's body, killed in an automobile accident during an annual trip to the resort island in the Bay of Naples. For the past decade, Baltimore industrialist Wendell Armbruster Sr. has spent a month each year at the Grand Hotel Excelsior, ostensibly for the therapeutic mud baths. On his way, Wendell Jr. encounters Pamela Piggott, a traveler from London who has come to Ischia to claim the body of her mother, Catherine. Wendell learns that his father and Pamela's mother died together in the same car accident. To Wendell's surprise, he discovers that his father ("Willie") had been having an affair with Pamela's mother ("Kate") throughout those ten years despite maintaining a marriage in Baltimore.

Already aware of this clandestine annual meeting between their parents, Pamela suggests burying them together on Ischia, a proposal that does not resonate with Wendell. Wendell wants to take his father's remains back home for a formal memorial, unrealistically scheduled in three days' time, to be broadcast to employees, the Coast Guard, and US dignitaries (including Henry Kissinger) as befits his status. As the hotel manager, Carlo Carlucci, plans a funeral and the transport of Wendell Sr.'s remains, the duo faces constant delays due to the bureaucratic hurdles and the leisurely pace of work inherent in Italian traditions. Arrogant and impatient of the red tape, Wendell acts out rudely to Pamela, the hotel staff, and Italian administrators.

A complicated series of events unfolds. Their plans are disrupted when the bodies mysteriously vanish from the morgue. Wendell suspects Pamela initially, but they soon discover that the Trotta family, whose vineyard suffered damage in the car accident, has stolen the remains. The Trottas demand a hefty ransom of two million lire, revealing another "Italian tradition"―extortion. Simultaneously, the hotel valet, Bruno, deported from America and seeking to return, attempts blackmail using compromising photos of Willie and Kate.

Initially, the boorish Wendell is ungallant with regard to Pamela's being about 20 pounds overweight, calling her "Fat-Ass" within earshot. As they re-create their parents' traditional activities together during their annual flings―prodded by the hotel staff who stage events in fond tribute to the popular deceased couple―Pamela’s caring nature mollifies Wendall's arrogance and they fall in love. Bruno's blackmail photos now also include naked photos of Wendell and Pamela as they bathed together in the bay. Bruno is shot dead by Anna, a pregnant chambermaid, when she learns that he wants to avoid marrying her and instead is plotting to return to the US with money raised by blackmail.

Despite these complications, Wendell's wife back in the States, using her connections, expedites the situation by involving State Department Agent J.J. Blodgett. Growing sympathetic to the clandestine couple's long commitment to each other, Wendell accedes to Willie and Kate's being buried together in the Carlucci family's burial vault. This leaves the problem of sending a body back to be escorted by Blodgett. Ironically fulfilling blackmailer Bruno's wish of going back to America, they place his remains in a coffin marked as Wendell Senior's. After enjoying the mud baths, Blodgett appoints Wendell Sr. to an embassy post, cynically promoting "Equal Opportunity Employment" of the deceased―unaware of the doubly cynical ploy resulting in the coffin holding Bruno's remains. Blodgett then sends "Wendell Sr.'s coffin" to the US in a diplomatic pouch, where it will not be opened and is destined for a closed-casket ceremony.

Carlucci assures Wendell and Pamela that their suite will be reserved for them during the same time next year, continuing their parents' tradition. Pamela assures Wendell that she will have lost the excess weight, to which he replies gallantly that if she loses even one pound, their liaison is off. Concluding their stay in Ischia, Wendell and Blodgett head to the Rome airport aboard a U.S. Navy helicopter.

== Cast ==
- Jack Lemmon as Wendell Armbruster Jr.
- Juliet Mills as Pamela Piggott
- Clive Revill as Carlo Carlucci
- Edward Andrews as J. J. Blodgett
- Gianfranco Barra as Bruno, the valet
- Franco Angrisano as Arnoldo Trotta
- Franco Acampora as Armando Trotta
- Giselda Castrini as Anna, the maid
- Pippo Franco as Matarazzo
- Giacomo Rizzo as the barman
- Antonino Faà di Bruno as the Concierge
- Yanti Somer and Janet Agren as the Nurses
- Raffaele Mottola as Passport Officer
- Harry Ray as Dr. Fleischmann
- Ty Hardin as Helicopter Pilot
- Sergio Bruni as himself

== Production ==
=== Development ===
Although Taylor's play had closed on Broadway in early 1968 after 21 performances, (it was profiled in the William Goldman book The Season: A Candid Look at Broadway) talent agent Charles Feldman, who previously had interested Billy Wilder in filming The Seven Year Itch, had purchased the screen rights and offered the property to the director. Wilder began working on The Private Life of Sherlock Holmes, and it was not until that film was completed that he focused on Avanti! Diamond was absent, and Wilder collaborated first with Julius J. Epstein and Norman Krasna but he was unhappy with them. Diamond became free, and with the ultimately uncredited assistance of Luciano Vincenzoni, he and Wilder adapted the play. Wilder was determined to create "a bittersweet love story, a little like Brief Encounter, which I always admired," he later recalled. After viewing a number of Italian films, Wilder selected cinematographer Luigi Kuveiller based on his work on Elio Petri's 1969 film A Quiet Place in the Country.

=== Casting ===
Early in the writing period, Wilder showed Jack Lemmon some of the completed script and he agreed to play Wendell Armbruster Jr. "Knowing pretty early on Jack was going to be in our film made it more comfortable writing his dialogue," said Diamond, who preferred to tailor a screenplay to a specific actor.

Wilder was a fan of Juliet Mills from the television sitcom Nanny and the Professor. He disliked the series but enjoyed watching the show to see her, as he considered her a good actress with a lot of appeal. He contacted her and personally offered her the role of Pamela Piggott. "I loved Billy Wilder just calling me and asking me to be in his film," the actress recalled, "no lawyer or agent, his voice, not asking for an audition or a screen test." Wilder told her the role required her to gain 25 pounds, and Mills agreed. She also agreed to a nude scene, although Diamond was opposed to including one in the film. "I think nudity hurts laughs," he stated. "I mean, if you're watching somebody's boobs, you're not listening to the dialogue."

Marcello Mastroianni declined the role of Carlucci. Nino Manfredi and Romolo Valli both tested for the part, but Wilder was concerned about their English ability, and cast Clive Revill (whom he'd previously directed The Private Life of Sherlock Holmes), whom he knew had a knack for languages and accents.

=== Filming ===
The film is set on the island of Ischia, where some of the exterior scenes were shot, including a brief scene outside the morgue "church Santa Maria del Soccorso" in Forio (the interior of which, as with all the interior sets, was designed by Italian production designer Ferdinando Scarfiotti); at and around the port of Ischia, where Lemmon and Mills visit the island; and on a small rock jutting out of the water just off the shore of Ischia, where the nudity scenes were shot. However, most of the exteriors were filmed in Sorrento, including the exterior of Lemmon's hotel; on Capri, notably the hilltop heliport overlooking the Tyrrhenian Sea; and along the Amalfi Coast.

Interiors were filmed on Scarfiotti's sets (including the interior lobby and hotel rooms) at Safa Palatino Studios in Rome following location shooting during the summer of 1972. Principal photography was completed on schedule and $100,000 under budget.

=== Music ===
The film's musical score was composed and arranged by Carlo Rustichelli, and conducted by Gianfranco Plenizio. The score incorporates and adapted several classic Italian songs, including “Palcoscenico” (Sergio Bruni, composers E. Bonagura, Chianese), “Senza fine” (Ornella Vanoni, composer G. Paoli), “Un’ora sola ti vorrei” (Nuccia Natali, composers P. Marchetti and U. Bertini) and "La Luna" (Milva, composers Detto Mariano, and Don Backy)

== Release ==
=== Home media ===
MGM Home Entertainment released the Region 1 DVD on July 15, 2003. It is in anamorphic widescreen format with audio tracks, and subtitles in English, French and Spanish.

Kino Lorber released the Region A Blu-ray on October 10, 2017. It is in Full HD (1920x1080) resolution with a picture aspect ratio of 1.85:1, encoded using the AVC video codec. It has a DTS-HD Master Audio lossless soundtrack and subtitles, both in English.

Extras comprise interviews with Juliet Mills and Clive Revill, and an original theatrical trailer.

== Reception ==
=== Critical response ===
A.H. Weiler of The New York Times thought the film was "intermittently funny, charming, cute and, unfortunately, over-long." He continued, "Wilder, Lemmon and I.A.L. Diamond . . . fitfully charm us but they haven't moved forward at any great comic clip. They have warped some parts of the playwright's plot to give us a fairly reasonable flow of giggles and an occasional guffaw." He cited "a fine job turned in by Clive Revill."

Roger Ebert of the Chicago Sun-Times called the film "a pleasant, civilized comedy" and added, "Avanti! isn't a laugh-a-minute kind of a movie, and it's too long by maybe half an hour. It also suffers from the problem that the audience has everything figured out several minutes before Jack Lemmon does. Still, the movie has a certain charm, some of which seeps in along with the locations, and there is in most of the many Wilder/Lemmon collaborations a cheerful insouciance, as if life is best approached with a cheerful, if puzzled, grin."

Jay Cocks of Time observed, "The topical dialogue by Wilder and I.A.L. Diamond — Kissinger jokes, Billy Graham jokes, etc. — gives this passingly pleasant movie the sound of a Bob Hope TV special. But Miss Mills is fresh and winning, and there is a deft performance by Clive Revill."

The British television network Channel 4 has called the film "a rare instance of the travel comedy - never an easy thing to pull off - succeeding without recourse to old racial stereotypes . . . As a love story, it's full of Wilder's biting satire . . . Taken at face value, it's simply a travel comedy about funny foreigners and love in the Mediterranean. Yet what stands out is how uncomfortable Wilder seems to be with making a sex comedy in the 1970s. Forced to take on board the aftershocks of the summer of love but saddled with an old man's attitude and an old man's cast, Wilder seems perilously out of his depth. As Lemmon and Mills strip off to reveal pale white skin and flabby fat, you can't help feeling that the resolutely misanthropic director is somewhat appalled by the realities of his characters' bedroom antics."

Wilder reported that he was disappointed with the film. "Maybe we went overboard with some of the comic relief, because Avanti! is not a comedy," he stated.

"If this film had worked the way we wanted it to, it would have had more of the quality of The Apartment. I always feel sorry for the disappointment of the actors, and all those dear technical people who do so much, when the picture doesn't make it the way they hoped. I went much farther with forbidden themes than I had with Kiss Me, Stupid, but nobody cared. Audiences thought it was too long and too bland. I guess they would have liked it better if it turned out the father was having the affair with one of the bellboys at the hotel."

=== Awards and nominations ===
Event	Category	Work	Result	Ref.
30th Golden Globe Awards	Best Motion Picture – Musical or Comedy	Avanti!	Nominated	
30th Golden Globe Awards	Best Director	Billy Wilder	Nominated	
30th Golden Globe Awards	Best Screenplay	Billy Wilder, I. A. L. Diamond	Nominated	
30th Golden Globe Awards	Best Actor in a Motion Picture – Musical or Comedy	Jack Lemmon	Won	
30th Golden Globe Awards	Best Actress in a Motion Picture – Musical or Comedy	Juliet Mills	Nominated	
30th Golden Globe Awards	Best Supporting Actor – Motion Picture	Clive Revill	Nominated	
25th Writers Guild of America Awards	Best Comedy Adapted from Another Medium	Billy Wilder, I. A. L. Diamond	Nominated	

Jack Lemmon's Golden Globe win set a record, winning his third Golden Globe in the Best Actor in a Motion Picture – Musical or Comedy category. Lemmon previously won the award for Some Like It Hot (1959) and The Apartment (1960). Coincidentally, both of them also directed by Billy Wilder and co-written with I. A. L. Diamond. Lemmon, who also received others including the prestigious Cecil B. DeMille Award, is currently tied for the most wins in this category alongside Robin Williams.

== Television remake ==
A new adaptation of Taylor's play was made for French television in 1994. Directed by Jacques Besnard, it starred Patrick Bouchitey, Laura Marinoni, and Farid Chopel. It premiered on August 3, 1994.

== See also ==
- List of American films of 1972
- List of Italian films of 1972
