= Just Go with It =

2011 film by Dennis Dugan

- Theatrical release poster
- Directed by: Dennis Dugan
- Screenplay by: Allan Loeb; Timothy Dowling
- Based on: Cactus Flower by I. A. L. Diamond Cactus Flower by Abe Burrows; Pierre Barillet; Jean-Pierre Gredy
- Produced by: Adam Sandler; Jack Giarraputo; Heather Parry
- Starring: Adam Sandler; Jennifer Aniston; Nick Swardson; Brooklyn Decker; Dave Matthews; Bailee Madison; Kevin Nealon; Griffin Gluck; Nicole Kidman
- Cinematography: Theo van de Sande
- Edited by: Tom Costain
- Music by: Rupert Gregson-Williams
- Production companies: Columbia Pictures; Happy Madison Productions
- Distributed by: Sony Pictures Releasing
- Release dates: February 8, 2011 (New York City); February 11, 2011 (United States)
- Running time: 117 minutes
- Country: United States
- Language: English
- Budget: $80 million
- Box office: $215 million

Just Go with It is a 2011 American romantic comedy film directed by Dennis Dugan, written by Allan Loeb and Timothy Dowling, and produced by Adam Sandler, Jack Giarraputo, and Heather Parry. It is a loose remake of the 1969 film Cactus Flower, and stars Sandler and Jennifer Aniston. It tells the story of a plastic surgeon who enlists his assistant to help him woo a sixth-grade math teacher.

Production of the film began on March 2, 2010. Originally titled Holiday in Hawaii and then Pretend Wife, it was produced by Sandler's Happy Madison Productions and released in North America on February 11, 2011, by Columbia Pictures. The film grossed over $214 million, becoming a box-office success. It received negative reviews with criticism for the plot and editing, but received some praise for its acting and writing. Just Go with It won two Golden Raspberry Awards for Worst Actor (Sandler) and Worst Director (Dugan).

== Plot ==
On his wedding day, Danny Maccabee overhears his fiancée admitting to her friends that she is only marrying him for his wealth and has been cheating on him. Distraught, Danny flees to a local bar. There, a woman begins flirting with him before noticing his ring. Upon being questioned about it, he claims he is in a dysfunctional marriage and successfully wins her over.

Years later, Danny is a successful plastic surgeon in Los Angeles and has improved his appearance. He keeps his wedding ring, using it to continue feigning being in an unhappy marriage so he can seduce women he meets without having to face long-term romantic commitment. The only woman aware of his scheme is Katherine Murphy, his office manager and a divorced mother of two.

At a party, Danny removes his ring to tend to a child's scraped knee. Shortly afterward, he meets Palmer, a young sixth-grade math teacher. They spend the night on the beach together, but Palmer finds the ring in his pocket the next morning. Palmer is furious that he apparently cheated on his wife with her, revealing that her own parents divorced due to infidelity. Instead of telling Palmer the truth, Danny claims he is getting divorced from a woman named Devlin Adams after she cheated on him with a man named Dolph Lundgren. When Palmer insists on meeting Devlin, Danny convinces Katherine to pose as her and give them her blessing.

After Palmer overhears Katherine talking on the phone with her children, Michael and Maggie, she assumes they are Danny's as well and requests to meet them. Danny convinces Michael and Maggie to go along with the scheme, though they blackmail him to take them all to Hawaii.

At the airport, they run into Danny's cousin Eddie, who is traveling in disguise as "Dolph Lundgren" while running from his ex-girlfriend's new boyfriend. To maintain the facade, Danny and Katherine are forced to bring him along.

At the resort in Hawaii, Katherine and Danny run into the real Devlin Adams, Katherine's frenemy from college, and her husband Ian Maxtone-Jones. Over time, Katherine becomes impressed by Danny and his way of interacting with her family. Danny, in turn, begins to develop feelings for Katherine.

As Danny is preparing to confess his feelings for Katherine, Palmer asks Danny to marry her the following day, having learned from a drunken Eddie of Danny's plans to get engaged. Though surprised by her proposal, Danny agrees.

Palmer asks Katherine if she still has feelings for Danny, which Katherine dismisses. Katherine runs into Devlin at a bar and admits that she pretended to be married to Danny to avoid embarrassment, and Devlin confesses that she is divorcing Ian, who is gay.

While Katherine is confiding in Devlin about her feelings for Danny, he arrives and announces he is not marrying Palmer because he is in love with Katherine, and they kiss. Palmer meets a professional tennis player who shares her interests, and Danny and Katherine eventually marry.

== Cast ==
- Adam Sandler as Dr. Daniel "Danny" Maccabee
- Jennifer Aniston as Katherine Murphy
- Nicole Kidman as Devlin Adams
- Brooklyn Decker as Palmer Dodge
- Nick Swardson as Eddie Simms
- Dave Matthews as Ian Maxtone-Jones
- Bailee Madison as Maggie Murphy
- Kevin Nealon as Adon
- Griffin Gluck as Michael Murphy
- Jackie Sandler as Veruca
- Rachel Dratch as Kirsten Brant
- Heidi Montag as Kimberly
- Minka Kelly as Joanna Damon
- Rakefet Abergel as Patricia
- Dan Patrick as Tanner Patrick
- Mario Joyner as Henderson
- Keegan-Michael Key as Ernesto
- Allen Covert as Brian (Soul Patch)
- Andy Roddick as himself
- Jake Shimabukuro as ukulele player

== Reception ==
=== Box office ===
Just Go with It grossed $103 million in the U.S. and Canada and $111.9 million in other territories for a worldwide gross of $214.9 million. The film topped its opening-weekend box office with $30.5 million. The biggest market in other territories was Russia, where it grossed $13,174,937.

=== Critical response ===
Just Go with It received generally negative reviews. On Rotten Tomatoes, the film has an approval rating of 20%, based on 136 reviews, with an average rating of 3.9/10. The site's consensus reads: "Just Go with It may be slightly better than some entries in the recently dire rom-com genre, but that's far from a recommendation." On Metacritic, the film has a score of 33 out of 100, based on 31 critics, indicating "generally unfavorable" reviews. Audiences polled by CinemaScore gave the film an average grade of "A−" on an A+ to F scale.

The Telegraph named Just Go with It in its "ten worst films of 2011" list, saying it is "a crass and overpopulated remake of Cactus Flower, served up as a mangy romcom of serial deceptions." Christopher Orr of The Atlantic noted that "the title itself seems a plea for audiences' forbearance" and is part of a disappointing trend involving "the reimagining of good, if perhaps not quite classic, films associated with the latter 1960s and early 1970s." Entertainment Weekly's Lisa Schwarzbaum wrote that Just Go with It "is saved from utter disaster, though, by Jennifer Aniston", who has "expert comic timing" and "plays like a grown-up", while Nicole Kidman was praised by Popmatters as the film's sole reasonable performance.

=== Accolades ===
List of awards and nominations
Award	Date of ceremony	Category	Recipients	Result	Ref.
Golden Raspberry Awards	April 1, 2012	Worst Actor	Adam Sandler (also for Jack and Jill)	Won	
Golden Raspberry Awards	April 1, 2012	Worst Supporting Actor	Nick Swardson (also for Jack and Jill)	Nominated	
Golden Raspberry Awards	April 1, 2012	Worst Supporting Actress	Nicole Kidman	Nominated	
Golden Raspberry Awards	April 1, 2012	Worst Screen Couple	Adam Sandler and either Jennifer Aniston or Brooklyn Decker	Nominated	
Golden Raspberry Awards	April 1, 2012	Worst Director	Dennis Dugan (also for Jack and Jill)	Won	
Teen Choice Awards	August 7, 2011	Choice Movie: Romantic Comedy	Just Go with It	Nominated	
Teen Choice Awards	August 7, 2011	Choice Movie Actor: Romantic Comedy	Adam Sandler	Nominated	
Teen Choice Awards	August 7, 2011	Choice Movie Actress: Romantic Comedy	Jennifer Aniston	Nominated	
Teen Choice Awards	August 7, 2011	Choice Movie Breakout: Female	Brooklyn Decker	Won	
Teen Choice Awards	August 7, 2011	Choice Movie: Chemistry	Adam Sandler and Jennifer Aniston	Won	

=== Home media ===
Sony Pictures Home Entertainment released Just Go with It on DVD and Blu-ray on June 7, 2011. As of 2019, it has grossed $25,014,665 in North American DVD sales.
