= Rick Lenz =

American actor, author and playwright (born 1939)

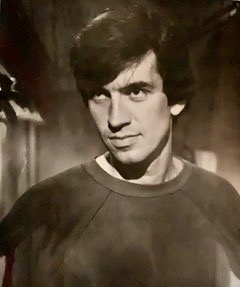
- Lenz in Cactus Flower (1969)
- Born: Richard Lenz; November 21, 1939 (age 86); Springfield, Illinois
- Occupations: actor, author, playwright
- Years active: 1965–2012
- Known for: Cactus Flower; The Shootist; Melvin and Howard

Rick Lenz (born November 21, 1939, Springfield, Illinois) is an American actor, author and playwright. Lenz is known for his performances in the films Cactus Flower (1969), The Shootist (1976), and Melvin and Howard (1980).

== Early career ==
Lenz was educated at the University of Michigan and New York University.. He directed the Jackson, Michigan, Civic Theater for two years before relocating to New York to seek work as an actor. In 1965, he made his Broadway debut in Mating Dance, starring Van Johnson. Though the show closed opening night, stage impresario David Merrick was in the audience, and soon afterward cast Lenz in the Broadway hit Cactus Flower as understudy for the juvenile lead role, Igor Sullivan. Lenz later took over the role and played it for a year. Film producer Mike Frankovich and Walter Matthau saw him in the part and cast him as Igor in the film version, with Goldie Hawn.

In the 1970s, Lenz appeared in several Hollywood movies, including How Do I Love Thee? (1970), Scandalous John (1971), Where Does It Hurt? (1972), The Shootist (1976), The Little Dragons (1980), and Melvin and Howard (1980).

== Filmography ==
=== Film ===
Year	Title	Role	Notes
1969	Cactus Flower	Igor Sullivan	
1970	How Do I Love Thee?	Tom Waltz	
1971	Scandalous John	Jimmy Whitaker	
1972	Where Does It Hurt?	Lester Hammond	
1976	The Shootist	Dobkins	Credited as Richard Lenz
1979	The Little Dragons	Dick Forbinger	
1980	Melvin and Howard	Lawyer	
2002	Home Room	Bereaved Father	
2002	Tequila Express	Gov. Jeffries	

=== Television ===
Year	Title	Role	Notes
1968-69	Green Acres	Brian Williams/Young Man	4 episodes
1969	Doc	Dr. Orville	Television Movie
1972	Ironside	Larry Van Buren	Episode: Achilles Heel
1972	Marcus Welby, M.D.	Don Malory	Episode: Don and Denise
1973	Circle of Fear	Dr. Stephen Crosley	Episode: Square Parts
1973	Love, American Style	Mike	Episode: Love and the Growing Romance
1971-74	Owen Marshall, Counselor at Law	Various roles	3 episodes
1972-74	Hec Ramsey	Chief Oliver Stamp	10 episodes
1974	Lucas Tanner	Chuck Lindstrom	Episode: A Question of Privacy
1975	Violence in Blue	Performer	Television Movie
1975	Ladies of the Corridor	Charles Nicols	Television Movie
1975	The Six Million Dollar Man	Michael Marchetti	2 episodes
1975	Medical Story	Dr. Donahue	Episode: A Life in the Balance
1975	Police Woman	Nick Tibbett	Episode: Pattern for Evil
1975	Kate McShane	Performer	Episode: Publish or Perish
1976	Mary Hartman, Mary Hartman	Paramedic	2 episodes
1976	The Bionic Woman	Dr. Michael Marchetti	2 episodes
1977	McMillan & Wife	Father Matheson	Episode: Dark Sunrise
1977	The Streets of San Francisco	Dave	Episode: One Last Trick
1978	Fantasy Island	Adam Parks	Episode: Carnival/The Vaudevillians
1980	One Day at a Time	Arnold Bates	Episode: Triple Play
1980	Reunion	Walker Hanson	Television Movie
1980	Vega$	Doctor	Episode: Black Cat Killer
1981	Elvis and the Beauty Queen	David Briggs	Television Film
1981	Dynasty	Dr. Jordan	3 episodes
1981	Palmerstown, U.S.A.	Tad	Episode: Dry Hole
1981	Advise to the Lovehorn	Prof. Jonas Miller	Television Movie
1981	T.J. Hooker	Dr. Damon Segal	Episode: God Bless the Child
1982	Lou Grant	Sam Valentine	Episode: Blacklist
1982	Insight	Brad	Episode: The Fiddler
1982	Cagney & Lacey	Colton Wyler	Episode: Hot Line
1982	Silver Spoons	Jack Thompson	Episode: The Best Christmas Ever
1983	Masquerade	Norman Weber	Episode: Diamonds
1983	The Greatest American Hero	Dr. Mor	Episode: Desperado
1984	Automan	Ronald Tilson	Episode: The Biggest Game in Town
1984	Airwolf	Moses	Episode: Proof Through the Night
1984	Magnum P.I.	Richard Hasley	Episode: Trans Quoc Jones
1983-1985	Simon & Simon	Various Roles	3 episodes
1985	Malice in Wonderland	Iceman	Television Movie
1986	All Is Forgiven	Francois Ronning	Episode: On Air Commitment
1986	You Again?	Pierce	Episode: Marry Me a Little
1986	Falcon Crest	Dr. Jesset	2 episodes
1987	In Self Defense	Chris Fowler	Television Movie
1987	The New Adventures of Beans Baxter	Benjamin Baxter Sr.	4 episodes
1988	The Law & Harry McGraw	Charlie Garrett	Episode: Marginnis for the People
1989	Spooner	Sheriff Reynolds	Television Movie
1990	The Trials of Rosie O'Neill	Conway	Episode: Mr. Right
1991	Shadow of a Doubt	Herb	Television Movie
1992	P.S.I. Luv U	Dr. Walter Flint	Episode: The Chameleon
1992	FBI: The Untold Stories	Bernie	Episode: Ring of Hostages
1993	Perry Mason: The Case of the Telltale Talk Show Host	Nick Scanlon	Television Movie
1987-96	Murder, She Wrote	Various Roles	2 episodes
1996	Wings	Jerry	Episode: What about Larry?
1997	Home Improvement	Dr. Matthews	Episode: The Flirting Game
1997	Baywatch	Dr. Gold	Episode: Heal the Bay
2001	Strong Medicine	Joe Tucker	Episode: Drugstore Cowgirl
2003	The Practice	Airline Representative	Episode: The Heat of Passion
2012	Treelore Theatre	Lonny/Mack	2 episodes

== Theatre ==
Year	Title	Role	Venue
1965	Mating Dance	Jeff	Eugene O'Neill Theatre, Broadway
1965-68	Cactus Flower	Igor	Royale Theatre, Broadway

== Personal life ==
As of 2017, Lenz resides in Los Angeles with his spouse, Linda; the couple married in May 1982. He has three children; sons Scott and Charlie, and daughter, Abigail.
