= Pie in the Sky (1964 film) =

1964 film by Allen Baron

- Theatrical release poster
- Directed by: Allen Baron
- Written by: Allen Baron
- Produced by: Merrill Brody; Dorothy E. Reed
- Starring: Lee Grant; Richard Bray; Michael Higgins; Robert Allen; Sylvia Miles
- Cinematography: Merrill S. Brody; Don Malkames
- Edited by: Ralph Rosenblum
- Music by: Robert Mersey
- Production company: Barbroo Productions / Bischoff-Diamond Corporation
- Distributed by: Allied Artists
- Release date: 1964
- Running time: 86 minutes
- Country: United States
- Language: English
- Budget: $180,000

Pie in the Sky is a 1964 American film drama written and directed by Allen Baron and starring Lee Grant, Sylvia Miles, and youngster Richard Bray (his only film work). Although filmed in 1962, financial and distribution problems delayed release until 1964. Shortly after the initial release, it was retitled Terror in the City.

== Plot ==
A nine-year-old boy, Brill (Richard Bray), who lives on a farm, hitchhikes to New York City. He finds work selling papers with a gang of shoeshine boys and paper carriers managed by teen punk Rick (Jaime Charlamagne), who keeps half their earnings. Brill wins Rick's money in a crap game, and he goes on the town with his Puerto Rican friend Paco (Roberto Marsach).

When Rick's gang gives Brill a beating, prostitute Suzy (Lee Grant) takes care of Brill, buys him new clothes and takes him on a tour of Manhattan. After Suzy is picked up by the police, Brill buys a bicycle to ride back to the farm. However, a truck ruins the bicycle on the highway, and he stays the night at the home of an elderly African-American couple. Back home the next day, he gives his father the rest of his money.

== Cast ==
- Lee Grant as Suzy
- Richard Bray as Brill
- Michael Higgins as Carl
- Robert Marsach as Paco
- Robert Allen as Brill's Father
- Sylvia Miles as Rose
- Ruth Attaway as Farmer's Wife
- Robert Earl Jones as Farmer
