= Blast of Silence =

1961 neo-noir film by Allen Baron

- Theatrical release poster
- Directed by: Allen Baron
- Written by: Allen Baron; Waldo Salt (Note: Narration uncredited); Will Sparks (Note: Story consultant)
- Produced by: Merrill Brody
- Starring: Allen Baron; Molly McCarthy; Larry Tucker
- Narrated by: Lionel Stander (Note: Uncredited)
- Cinematography: Merrill Brody
- Edited by: Peggy Lawson
- Music by: Meyer Kupferman
- Production company: Magla Productions
- Distributed by: Universal Pictures
- Release dates: June 5, 1961 (Chicago); December 29, 1961 (New York City)
- Running time: 77 minutes
- Country: United States
- Language: English
- Budget: $20,800 (about $200,000 today)

Blast of Silence is a 1961 American neo-noir film written and directed by Allen Baron, and starring Allen Baron, with Molly McCarthy, Larry Tucker, and Peter H. Clune in supporting roles. Set during Christmastime, it follows a hitman who returns to his native New York City to commit a murder for hire. It was produced by Merrill Brody, who was also the cinematographer.

== Plot ==
Frankie Bono, an Italian-American Mafia hitman working with the Mafia in Cleveland, returns to his hometown of New York City during Christmas week to kill Troiano, a middle-management mobster. The assassination will be risky, and Frankie is warned by the go-between who delivers the front half of Frankie's money that the contract will be reneged if he is spotted before the hit is performed.

Frankie follows his target to determine the best possible location for the hit; he discovers that when Troiano is in his daily routine, he is no longer accompanied by bodyguards. He then purchases a revolver from Big Ralph, an obese man who keeps sewer rats as pets. The encounter with this old acquaintance leaves Frankie feeling disgusted. With several days to wait before the hit, Frankie spends time in the city, where he is plagued by memories of past trauma from his former life there.

Frankie encounters his childhood friend Petey, who invites him a Christmas party with Petey's sister Lorrie, with whom Frankie was also acquainted in the past. Frankie reluctantly attends the party and uneasily enjoys spending time with a family for Christmas. The following day, Frankie visits Lorrie at her apartment, but the visit ends in disaster when Frankie suddenly attempts to make a pass at her. Lorrie forgives Frankie, but asks him to leave.

The same day, Frankie tails Troiano and his mistress to the Village Gate jazz club in Greenwich Village. However, he is spotted by Big Ralph, who plans to blackmail Frankie for more money for the gun. Frankie follows Ralph back to his apartment and strangles him to death following a violent fight. Losing his nerve, Frankie calls his employers to tell them that he wants to quit the job. The Mafia bosses, though, warn Frankie that he may not quit and that he has until New Year's Eve to perform the hit.

Frankie visits Lorrie again to apologize and to convince her to leave New York with him, but he learns that she has a live-in boyfriend. Frankie leaves angrily to finish the job.

After killing Troiano, Frankie narrowly evades detection by a cleaner and then calls to find the location where he may receive the rest of his payment. The meeting, set in a lonely, isolated spot on the water, is an ambush, though, and Frankie is riddled with bullets. He falls into the water, dead.

== Cast ==
- Allen Baron as Frank Bono
- Molly McCarthy as Lorrie
- Larry Tucker as Big Ralph
- Peter H. Clune as Troiano
- Danny Meehan as Petey
- Howard Mann as Bodyguard
- Charles Creasap as Contact man
- Bill DePrato as Joe Boniface
- Milda Memenas as Troiano's girl friend
- Joe Bubbico as Bodyguard
- Ruth Kaner as Cleaning woman
- Gil Rogers as Gangster
- Jerry Douglas as Gangster
- Dan Saroyan as Lorrie's boyfriend
- Dean Sheldon as Nightclub singer
- Erich Kollmar as Bellhop
- Mel Spandar as Drummer
- Lionel Stander as Narrator

== Production ==
Writer/director Allen Baron raised $2,800 to shoot and develop test footage, which then enabled him to raise an additional $18,000 to produce the film, and the test footage was used in the final film. The lead part was intended for Peter Falk, Baron's friend from summer stock theater, but Falk secured a paying job in Murder, Inc., so the role fell to Baron, with the test footage serving as his screen test. Many of Baron's friends and family appear in the film.

Twenty-two days of shooting took place over a four-month period ending in January 1960. Most of the scenes were filmed in actual New York City locations without a filming permit. Some interiors were reported to have been filmed in a studio on West 45th Street. The exterior chase that ends the film was shot at the Old Mill on a Jamaica Bay estuary on Long Island during Hurricane Donna (September 10–12, 1960), the only hurricane of the 20th century to blanket the entire East Coast from south Florida to Maine. The location was said to be a dumping ground for the dead bodies of mob hits, which is why Baron selected it for the scene. Its isolation also meant that a full day's shooting could take place without permits. The final shot was filmed in one take. Baron performed his own stunts.

The film was shot with equipment that had been abandoned in Cuba after the shooting of Errol Flynn's final film, Cuban Rebel Girls, when the crew was forced to flee the country because of the Cuban Revolution. Baron struck a deal with the producers of Cuban Rebel Girls to use the equipment if he could smuggle it out of Cuba. Baron, who had been a crew member during the Cuban Rebel Girls shoot, had accidentally shot and wounded a man and was wanted in Cuba for the crime. He also had an affair with a woman whom he did not realize was the girlfriend of a Cuban gangster.

The narration, which was added after the film was completed to help tie it together, was written by blacklisted writer Waldo Salt using the name Mel Davenport, and was read, uncredited, by blacklisted actor Lionel Stander. Stander was paid $500 for the work, and it would have cost an additional $500 to use his name in the credits.

Baron and producer Merrill Brody sold the permanent film rights to Universal for $50,000.

== Release ==
Blast of Silence was released in Chicago on June 5, 1961, and in New York City on December 29, 1961. The film was entered in the Spoleto Film Festival in Spoleto, Italy, the Locarno Film Festival in Switzerland, and the Cannes Film Festival.

=== Critical response ===
Eugene Archer of The New York Times wrote that the film was "awkward and pretentious" because it tried to hew to American conventions of filmmaking while attempting to be "offbeat and 'arty'", but Archer praised the New York location filming.

In Photoplay, Janet Graves wrote that the "unpretentious air" clashes with the style of the narration, described by the writer as "both fancy and too-too tough."

In The New Yorker, Richard Brody wrote that the film was a, "dazzlingly brisk yet richly nuanced seventy-seven minutes" and "many of the images deserve to be iconic."

J.R. Jones of the Chicago Reader wrote that the film "might seem comical if it weren't so rooted in existential dread."

=== Home media ===
The Criterion Collection released Blast of Silence on DVD in 2008. The disc's special features included a new digital transfer, a making-of featurette (Requiem for a Killer: The Making of Blast of Silence), rare on-set Polaroid photos and images of locations as they existed in 2008. Also included is a booklet featuring an essay by film critic Terrence Rafferty and a comic book by artist Sean Phillips. On December 5, 2023, the Criterion Collection reissued the film on Blu-ray featuring a new 4K restoration of the film in two different aspect ratios.

== Sources ==
- Silver, Alain; Ward, Elizabeth, eds. (1992). Film Noir: An Encyclopedic Reference to the American Style (Third ed.). Woodstock, New York: The Overlook Press. ISBN 0-87951-479-5.
