= Allen Baron =

American television and film director, actor, and comic book artist (born 1927)

- Born: April 14, 1927 (age 98); New York City, New York, U.S.
- Occupations: Actor, film and television director
- Known for: Blast of Silence

Allen Baron (born April 14, 1927) is an American television and film director, actor, and comic book artist. He wrote, directed, and starred in the 1961 film Blast of Silence.

== Biography ==
=== Early life ===
Baron was born and raised in the Brooklyn borough of New York City to Polish and Russian immigrant parents. He lived on Logan Street and Sutter Avenue in his youth, which saw him lose his father at 11 years old. He lived in Lewiston, Maine for a time with his mother before moving back to Brooklyn. He dropped out of high school at the age of 16 to get a job, which saw him work with the War Department, where he apparently unknowingly worked on the atomic bomb. He joined the Navy a year later. At the age of 19, he enrolled at the School of Visual Arts, intending to become a visual artist, and later worked as a cartoonist, illustrator, and taxi driver. He first took an acting class at the age of 25, which also saw him meet his future wife.

=== Career ===
In his early 20s, Baron drew romance and science-fiction comic stories. Upon visiting a Paramount sound stage in the mid-1950s, he decided he wanted to work in films, and he became involved in theatrical acting. His film debut came with Cuban Rebel Girls (1959).

Baron is best known for writing and directing the 1961 film noir Blast of Silence, in which he also plays the lead role of the hitman. He also wrote and directed the 1964 film Terror in the City (alternate title Pie in the Sky), the 1972 film Outside In, and the 1982 film Foxfire Light with Leslie Nielsen and Tippi Hedren.

For TV, Baron directed the movie The San Pedro Bums (1977), which was the pilot for the TV series The San Pedro Beach Bums.

Baron directed over 200 episodes of television shows, including multiple episodes of The Love Boat, Charlie's Angels, Arnie, Love, American Style, Room 222, The New Temperatures Rising Show, House Calls, Kolchak: The Night Stalker, and Run, Joe, Run. His last directing credit came in 1986.

As of 2013, he resided in Beverly Hills, California, spending his time painting. In that same year, Blast of Silence: A Memoir, a book detailing his experiences as a filmmaker, was published.

== Personal life ==
In 2018, Baron was accused of sexual harassment by his former personal assistant, who alleged a laundry list of misconduct, ranging from forcing her to touch him when he was erect to denigrating her faith (listed as Christian while Baron was listed as of the Jewish faith) to him telling her about how he forced multiple Cuban women to have sex with him for roles in the 1959 film Cuban Rebel Girls, which he was an assistant director on.
