= Bob & Carol & Ted & Alice =

1969 film by Paul Mazursky

- Theatrical release poster
- Directed by: Paul Mazursky
- Written by: Paul Mazursky; Larry Tucker
- Produced by: Larry Tucker
- Starring: Natalie Wood; Robert Culp; Elliott Gould; Dyan Cannon
- Cinematography: Charles E. Lang
- Edited by: Stuart H. Pappé
- Music by: Quincy Jones
- Color process: Eastmancolor
- Production company: Frankovich Productions
- Distributed by: Columbia Pictures
- Release dates: September 17, 1969 (New York Film Festival); October 8, 1969 (New York)
- Running time: 105 minutes
- Country: United States
- Language: English
- Budget: $2 million
- Box office: $31.9 million

Bob & Carol & Ted & Alice is a 1969 American comedy-drama film directed by Paul Mazursky, written by Mazursky and Larry Tucker, who also produced the film, and starring Natalie Wood, Robert Culp, Elliott Gould, and Dyan Cannon. The original music score was composed by Quincy Jones. The cinematography for the film was by Charles Lang. The film received four Academy Award nominations, including ones for Gould and Cannon. Patricia Welles wrote the paperback novelization from Mazursky and Tucker's screenplay.

== Plot ==
After a weekend of emotional honesty at an Esalen-style retreat, Los Angeles sophisticates Bob and Carol Sanders return home determined to embrace complete openness. They share their enthusiasm and excitement over their new-found philosophy with their more conservative friends Ted and Alice Henderson, who remain doubtful. Soon after, filmmaker Bob has an affair with a young production assistant on a film shoot in San Francisco. When he returns home, he admits his liaison to Carol, describing the event as a purely physical act, not an emotional one. To Bob's surprise, Carol is completely accepting of his extramarital behavior. Later, Carol gleefully reveals the affair to Ted and Alice as they are leaving a dinner party. Disturbed by Bob's infidelity and Carol's candor, Alice becomes physically ill on the drive home. She and Ted have a difficult time coping with the news in bed that night. However, as time passes, they grow to accept that Bob and Carol really are fine with the affair. Later, Ted admits to Bob that he was tempted to have an affair once, but did not go through with it; Bob tells Ted he should, rationalizing: "You've got the guilt anyway. Don't waste it."

During another visit to San Francisco, Bob decides to skip a second encounter with the young woman, instead returning home a day early. When he arrives, he discovers Carol having an affair with her tennis instructor. Although initially outraged, Bob quickly realizes that the encounter was purely physical, like his own affair. He settles down and even chats and drinks with the man.

When the two couples travel together to Las Vegas, Bob and Carol reveal Carol's affair to Ted and Alice. Ted then admits to an affair on a recent business trip to Miami. An outraged Alice demands that this new ethos be taken to its obvious conclusion: a mate-sharing foursome. Ted is reluctant, explaining that he loves Carol "like a sister", but eventually acknowledges that he finds her attractive. After discussing it, all four remove their clothes and climb into bed together. Swapping partners, Bob and Alice kiss fervently, as do Ted and Carol, but after a few moments all four simply stop.

The scene cuts to the couples walking to the elevator, riding it down, and walking out of the casino hand-in-hand with their original partners. A crowd of men and women of various cultures and races congregate in the casino parking lot, wherein the four main characters exchange long stares with each other and with strangers, reminiscent of the non-verbal communication shown in the early scene at the retreat. Producer-Writer Larry Tucker appears in the final crowd scene, facing Dyan Cannon, then looks directly in the lens.

== Cast ==
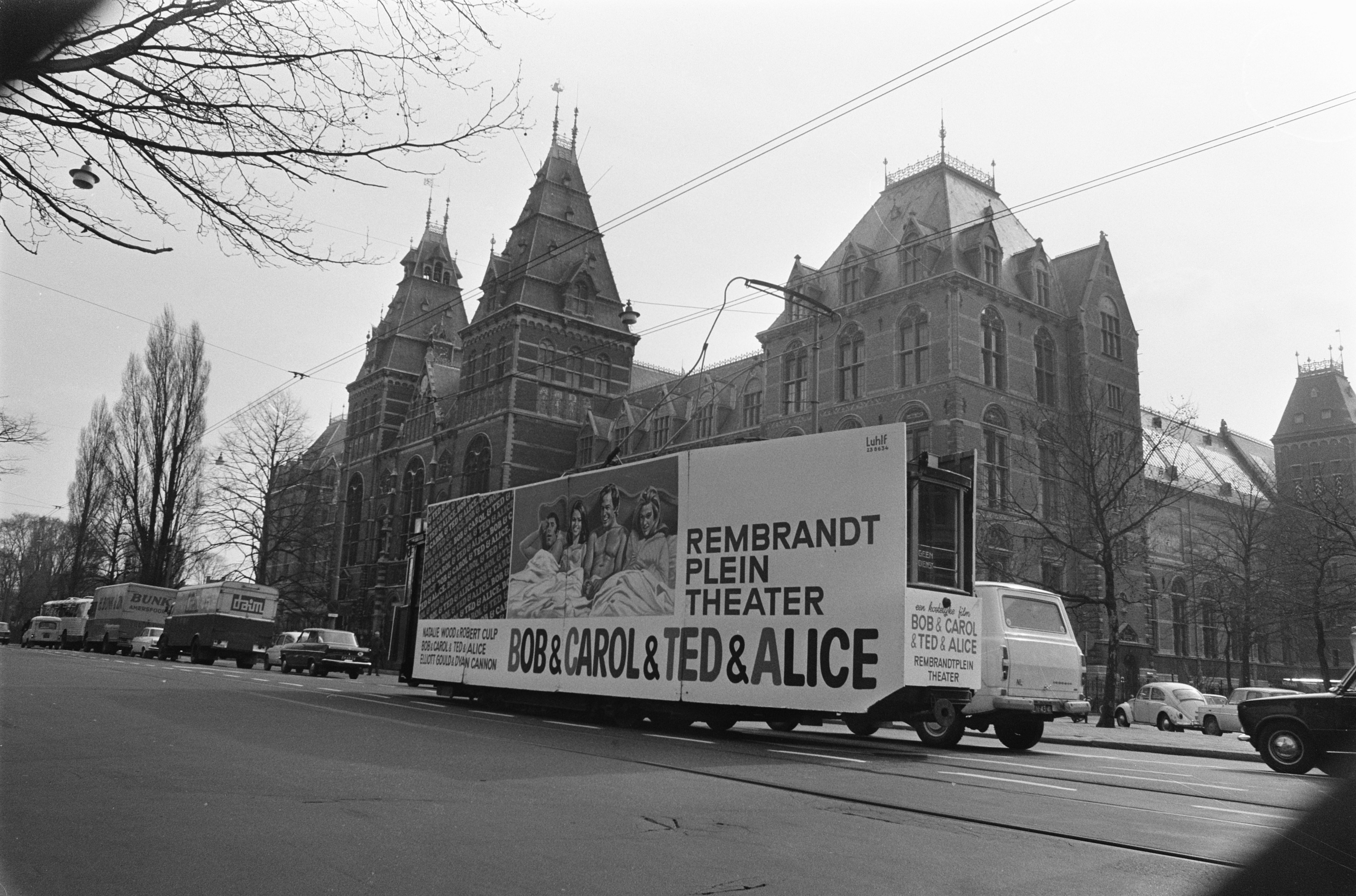
Advertising tram for the film Bob & Carol & Ted & Alice in Amsterdam, Netherlands (March 26, 1970).

- Natalie Wood as Carol Sanders
- Robert Culp as Bob Sanders
- Elliott Gould as Ted Henderson
- Dyan Cannon as Alice Henderson
- Horst Ebersberg as Horst
- Lee Bergere as Emilio
- Donald F. Muhich as Psychiatrist
- Noble Lee Holderread Jr. as Sean Sanders
- K.T. Stevens as Phyllis
- Celeste Yarnall as Susan
- Lynn Borden as Cutter
- Linda Burton as Stewardess
- Greg Mullavey as Group Leader
- Andre Philippe as Oscar
- Garry Goodrow as Bert
- Leif Garrett as Jimmy Henderson (uncredited)
- Susana Miranda as Woman on Aeroplane (uncredited)

== Production ==
Director Paul Mazursky was inspired by an article he read in Time magazine about Fritz Perls, a "gestalt therapist" that was described as being in a hot tub with naked people at a place called the Esalen Institute (located in the Slates Hot Springs in Big Sur, California), a place formed in 1962 dealing with New Age therapy. Mazursky went there with his wife as the only two people in the group who knew each other. This, alongside further collaboration in Palm Springs with writing partner Larry Tucker, resulted in a final script. Mazursky, having been denied the chance to direct I Love You, Alice B. Toklas, a script he wrote with Tucker, insisted on directing. Producer Mike Frankovich expressed interest. Mazursky insisted on directing, citing his direction of a short called Last Year at Malibu and his study of acting alongside observing camerawork from the aforementioned Toklas film and studying editing at the University of Southern California at night as credentials. Frankovich accepted him as director, while Tucker would produce and Frankovich served as executive producer. For the psychotherapist scene, Mazursky cast his own therapist Donald F. Muhich that he had been seeing to act opposite Dyan Cannon. Muhich would appear in three further films with Mazursky as director.

The original ending in the first draft involved the four characters crying in each other's arms after an aborted orgy, complete with pulling themselves together on their way to a Tony Bennett show. Instead, Mazursky went with an ending that sees the characters walk with each other back outside while "What the World Needs Now Is Love" plays in the background, which he called his "Fellini ending", as it resembled the ending to 8½ (1963). Addressing complaints of the ending being a cop-out in 1970, he stated that "The easiest thing in the world would have been to show those four making it together in that bed. But it became obvious to us that these four people in these circumstances couldn't possibly have done it.”

== Musical score and soundtrack ==
Bob & Carol & Ted & Alice

Soundtrack album by Quincy Jones
- Released: 1969
- Recorded: 1969
- Genre: Film score
- Length: 31:41
- Labels: Bell; Bell 1200
- Producer: Quincy Jones

Quincy Jones chronology
Walking in Space (1969)	Bob & Carol & Ted & Alice (1969)	Cactus Flower (1969)

The film score was composed, arranged and conducted by Quincy Jones and featured Jackie DeShannon performing Burt Bacharach and Hal David's "What the World Needs Now Is Love" and Sarah Vaughan performing "I know that my Redeemer liveth" from Part III of Handel's Messiah. The soundtrack album was released on the Bell label in 1969. The Vinyl Factory said "in 1969 (a busy year for the man), Jones produced this sparkling score, with its lavish string arrangements and jazzy interludes. ... What sounds like a lot of work went into an unconventional soundtrack for an unconventional movie about sexual experimentation".

=== Track listing ===
All compositions by Quincy Jones, except where noted

1. "Main Title From Bob & Carol & Ted & Alice (Handel's Hallelujah Chorus)" (George Frideric Handel adapted by Quincy Jones) − 2:24
2. "Sun Dance (Handel's Messiah Pt. 3)" (Handel adapted by Jones) − 3:46
3. "Giggle Grass" − 2:30
4. "Sweet Wheat" − 3:31
5. "What The World Needs Now (Instrumental)" (Burt Bacharach, Hal David) − 3:07
6. "What The World Needs Now" (Bacharach, David) − 3:48
7. "Celebration of Life (Instrumental) (Handel's Hallelujah Chorus)" (Handel adapted by Jones) − 2:54
8. "Sun Dance (Instrumental) (Handel's Messiah Pt. 3)" (Handel adapted by Jones) − 3:31
9. "Dynamite" − 2:34
10. "Flop Sweat" − 3:27

=== Personnel ===
- Unidentified orchestra arranged and conducted by Quincy Jones including
  - Merrilee Rush (track 6), Sarah Vaughan (track 2) − vocals
  - Dennis Budimir − guitar
  - Bud Shank − reeds
  - Carol Kaye − electric bass
  - Emil Richards − percussion

== Release ==
The film was the first American film to open the New York Film Festival, opening on September 16, 1969. It opened October 8, 1969 at Cinema I in New York City before the Columbus Day holiday weekend.

== Reception ==
Bob & Carol & Ted & Alice became the signature film of Paul Mazursky and was a critical and commercial success. Mazursky called it the film of which he is proudest. It was the sixth highest-grossing film of 1969. It grossed $50,000 in its first week, setting a house record. After this film's release, it led to other movies dealing with wife swapping, infidelity, and other types of experimentation with interpersonal relationships inside American society. Mazursky would write and shoot a few more stories set in California, including Alex in Wonderland and Down and Out in Beverly Hills.

Vincent Canby of The New York Times panned the film as "unpleasant because it acts superior to the people in it, which is no mean feat because Bob and Carol and Ted and Alice are conceived as cheerful but humorless boobs, no more equipped to deal with their sexual liberation than Lucy and Desi and Ozzie and Harriet." Roger Ebert of the Chicago Sun-Times, however, gave the film four stars out of four and wrote, "The genius of 'Bob and Carol and Ted and Alice' is that it understands the peculiar nature of the moral crisis for Americans in this age group, and understands that the way to consider it is in a comedy." Charles Champlin of the Los Angeles Times called it "a scintillating social comedy and a movie which could turn out to have more to say about you than any flick you'll see this year." Gene Siskel of the Chicago Tribune gave the film three-and-a-half-stars out of four and called it "the best comedy of the year," with acting that was "eminently tender and believable." Gary Arnold of The Washington Post declared it "the sharpest American comedy in several years ... It may be the same old marital war, but the battle lines and the weapons are modern, and this makes all the difference in the world between a comedy that feels 'new' and one that feels second-hand." Writing in The New Yorker the film critic Pauline Kael praised both the film and director Mazursky, calling it "a slick, whorey movie, and the liveliest American comedy so far this year. Mazursky, directing his first picture, has developed a style from satiric improvisational revue theatre—he and Tucker [co-writer] were part of the Second City troupe—and from TV situation comedy, and, with skill and wit, has made this mixture work—though it looks conventional, it isn't." John Simon called Bob & Carol & Ted & Alice 'deplorable'.

The film holds a score of 82% on Rotten Tomatoes based on 61 reviews with the consensus: "Bob & Carol & Ted & Alice isn't as subversive as it thinks it is -- but it is smart & sophisticated & funny & well-acted."

== Accolades ==
Award	Category	Nominee(s)	Result
Academy Awards	Best Supporting Actor	Elliott Gould	Nominated
Academy Awards	Best Supporting Actress	Dyan Cannon	Nominated
Academy Awards	Best Story and Screenplay – Based on Material Not Previously Published or Produced	Paul Mazursky and Larry Tucker	Nominated
Academy Awards	Best Cinematography	Charles Lang	Nominated
British Academy Film Awards	Best Actor in a Leading Role	Elliott Gould (also for M*A*S*H)	Nominated
British Academy Film Awards	Best Screenplay	Paul Mazursky and Larry Tucker	Nominated
Golden Globe Awards	Best Actress in a Motion Picture – Musical or Comedy	Dyan Cannon	Nominated
Golden Globe Awards	Most Promising Newcomer – Female	Dyan Cannon	Nominated
Laurel Awards	Top Male New Face	Elliott Gould	6th Place
Laurel Awards	Top Music Man	Quincy Jones	4th Place
National Society of Film Critics Awards	Best Supporting Actress	Dyan Cannon	3rd Place
National Society of Film Critics Awards	Best Screenplay	Paul Mazursky and Larry Tucker	Won
New York Film Critics Circle Awards	Best Supporting Actor	Elliott Gould	Runner-up
New York Film Critics Circle Awards	Best Supporting Actress	Dyan Cannon	Won
New York Film Critics Circle Awards	Best Screenplay	Paul Mazursky and Larry Tucker	Won
Writers Guild of America Awards	Best Comedy Written Directly for the Screen	Paul Mazursky and Larry Tucker	Won

== In popular culture ==
- The Carol Burnett Show used Bob & Carol & Ted & Alice as the basis for a sketch in Season 3, Episode 9 in 1969.
- Hansel and Gretel and Ted and Alice, an opera in one unnatural act, S. 2n-1 by the fictional composer P.D.Q. Bach (which was created by the American composer Peter Schickele), which was released on The Intimate P.D.Q. Bach LP in 1973, was inspired by Bob & Carol & Ted & Alice
- The title of the 2016 episode of the sitcom New Girl, "Bob & Carol & Nick & Schmidt", is a play on the title of the film.
- Along with Mazursky's Blume in Love (1973), Bob & Carol & Ted & Alice served as the opening feature for the reopening of Quentin Tarantino's New Beverly Cinema in Los Angeles in 2014.
- Comedy television program SCTV created a sketch titled Garth & Gord & Fiona & Alice, a "Canadian film made for Canadians by Canadians," and distributed by American Films International. Despite the similarity in title to Bob & Carol & Ted & Alice, the sketch is actually a parody of the Canadian film Goin' Down the Road (1970).
- Mad Magazine did a spoof of the movie, titled "Boob & Carnal & Tad & Alas & Alfred", in the September 1970 edition.
- In its 1970 college football preview issue, Sports Illustrated noted Michigan State coach Duffy Daugherty "made more position shifts (in spring practice and summer camp) than Bob & Carol & Ted & Alice".

== See also ==
- List of American films of 1969
