= Potiche =

2010 film by François Ozon

- Theatrical release poster
- Directed by: François Ozon
- Screenplay by: François Ozon
- Based on: Potiche (play) by: Pierre Barillet; Jean-Pierre Gredy
- Produced by: Éric Altmayer; Nicolas Altmayer
- Starring: Catherine Deneuve; Gérard Depardieu; Fabrice Luchini; Karin Viard; Judith Godrèche; Jérémie Renier
- Cinematography: Yorick Le Saux
- Edited by: Laure Gardette
- Music by: Philippe Rombi
- Production companies: Mandarin Cinéma; FOZ; France 2 Cinéma; Mars Films; Wild Bunch; Scope Pictures
- Distributed by: Mars Distribution (France); Cinéart (Belgium)
- Release dates: 4 September 2010 (Venice); 10 November 2010 (France and Belgium)
- Running time: 99 minutes
- Countries: France; Belgium
- Language: French
- Budget: $13.2 million
- Box office: $32.3 million

Potiche is a 2010 comedy film written and directed by François Ozon, based on the play of the same name by Pierre Barillet and Jean-Pierre Gredy. It stars Catherine Deneuve, Gérard Depardieu, Fabrice Luchini, Karin Viard, Judith Godrèche and Jérémie Renier. Set in 1977, the film tells the story of a submissive wife who gets to run her husband's umbrella factory, after the employees rebel against their tyrannical manager. In French, a potiche [pɔ.tiʃ] is a decorative vase, but by extension means "window dressing" or, roughly, "trophy wife". The film competed at the 67th Venice International Film Festival and received two Magritte Award nominations, winning Best Supporting Actor for Jérémie Renier.

== Plot ==
In 1977, in the fictional small French town of Sainte-Gudule, Nord, Suzanne Pujol is the submissive trophy wife of Robert, the president of the umbrella factory founded by Suzanne's late father. Tyrannical and reactionary, Robert often patronizes Suzanne, treats his workers with contempt and is having an affair with his secretary Nadège. Suzanne and Robert have two adult children; daughter Joëlle, the conservative wife of a constantly traveling businessman and mother of two young children, is considering divorcing her husband, while son Laurent, a liberal-minded and artistically inclined student, is engaged to a frequently absent woman.

When the factory workers go on strike, demanding better working conditions, Robert storms off to confront them and is taken hostage. That night, Suzanne visits Maurice Babin, the town's Communist mayor and a former union leader with whom she once had an affair in their youth, to negotiate for Robert's release. The next day, when Babin confronts Robert about having used company money to buy an expensive car and other luxuries, Robert suffers a heart attack and is hospitalized.

Babin convinces Suzanne to take over management of the factory in Robert's absence and negotiate with the workers. Adopting a diplomatic and friendly approach, Suzanne succeeds in appeasing the workers and getting production back on track. She also brings her two children on board to help her, with Laurent designing new patterns for the umbrellas inspired by his favorite artist, Wassily Kandinsky. Under Suzanne's respectful yet efficient leadership, the company experiences a significant increase in sales.

Suzanne and Babin go to a nightclub where they dance together and he proposes that they rekindle their affair; she refuses and insists that they remain friends, but kisses him nevertheless. When Robert recovers from his heart attack, he wants to regain control of the factory, but Suzanne protests and informs him that she holds the majority of the company's shares. Nadège ends her affair with Robert and sides with Suzanne, feeling that she respects her in a way Robert never did.

When Robert tells Suzanne that Laurent's fiancée's mother was once his mistress, Suzanne counters that Laurent is not Robert's son, as she was also unfaithful early in their marriage. After Joëlle hands Robert Suzanne's locket, which contains photos of her and Babin in it, Robert confronts Babin, intending to blackmail him with the information about his illegitimate son. Babin, however, is overjoyed to learn that Laurent is his son. He drives with Suzanne to a lake, where she clarifies that Laurent is not his son either, and his father is most likely a notary with whom she once had an affair. Disappointed, Babin leaves Suzanne alone in the wilderness, forcing her to hitchhike home.

At a board meeting to determine who will run the company, Joëlle unexpectedly transfers her shares to Robert, forcing Suzanne to hand over management of the company to her husband. Afterwards, Joëlle confesses to Suzanne that Robert had promised to hire her husband in exchange for her shares, as she is pregnant again and no longer wants a divorce.

A few months later, Suzanne and Robert are in the midst of a divorce, though they continue to live together. Inspired by her newfound independence, she pursues a career in politics, running for mayor as an independent candidate against Babin in the upcoming election. She is eventually elected as a deputy, while Babin continues as mayor.

== Cast ==
- Catherine Deneuve as Suzanne Pujol
  - Élodie Frégé as young Suzanne
- Gérard Depardieu as Maurice Babin
- Fabrice Luchini as Robert Pujol
- Karin Viard as Nadège Dumoulin
- Judith Godrèche as Joëlle Pujol
- Jérémie Renier as Laurent Pujol
- Sergi López as the truck driver
- Évelyne Dandry as Geneviève Michonneau, Suzanne's sister
- Bruno Lochet as André Ferron, the unionist

== Production ==
François Ozon saw the play Potiche by Pierre Barillet and Jean-Pierre Grédy about ten years before he made the film. According to Ozon, the genesis of the film version was, partly, that he had been approached by the producers Éric and Nicolas Altmayer and asked to make a biographical film about Nicolas Sarkozy, and, partly, his experiences from the 2007 presidential campaign, where he followed the Socialist Party's candidate Ségolène Royal. While writing the screenplay, Ozon regularly met with Barillet, who gladly approved the tweaks made in order to enhance the story's relevance for contemporary society. The 1970s setting was, however, retained; this was both because the distance allowed the director to make a more humorous film, and because France was more politically divided in the 1970s, which made the class relations more remarkable. The political career of Suzanne was entirely Ozon's own addition to the story, which in its original incarnation ended when Robert returns to the factory.

The project was led by Mandarin Cinéma, with co-production support from Production Services Belgium. Principal photography took place in Belgium from 26 October 2009 and lasted eight weeks. The film was deliberately given a theatrical look in order to create distance and give the audience a constant awareness of watching a work of fiction. An important influence for the visual style was the cinema of Jacques Demy. The soundtrack includes Michèle Torr with "Emmène-moi danser ce soir", "Il était une fois", "Viens faire un tour sous la pluie" and Jean Ferrat's "C'est beau la vie".

== Release ==
The film premiered on 4 September 2010 in competition at the 67th Venice International Film Festival. It was released in France and Belgium on 10 November. Launched in 440 prints through Mars Distribution, Potiche had 875,000 admissions during its first week in French theatres. At its peak the film was playing in 542 venues. When the theatrical run ended, the total number of tickets sold in France had reached 2,318,221. As of 28 June 2011, Box Office Mojo reported that the worldwide theatrical revenues of the film corresponded to 23,157,170 US dollars.

=== Overseas ===
A subtitled version in English was released on DVD in October 2011. Clips from the film were used in "trailers" subtitled by Orange, with all the dialogue reworded to be about mobile phones, in order to illustrate how phones can ruin a film.

== Reception ==
On review aggregator website Rotten Tomatoes, the film holds an approval rating of 84%, based on 117 reviews. On Metacritic, the film has a weighted average score of 68 out of 100, based on 31 critics, indicating "generally favorable reviews".
