= Clive Revill =

New Zealand actor (1930–2025)

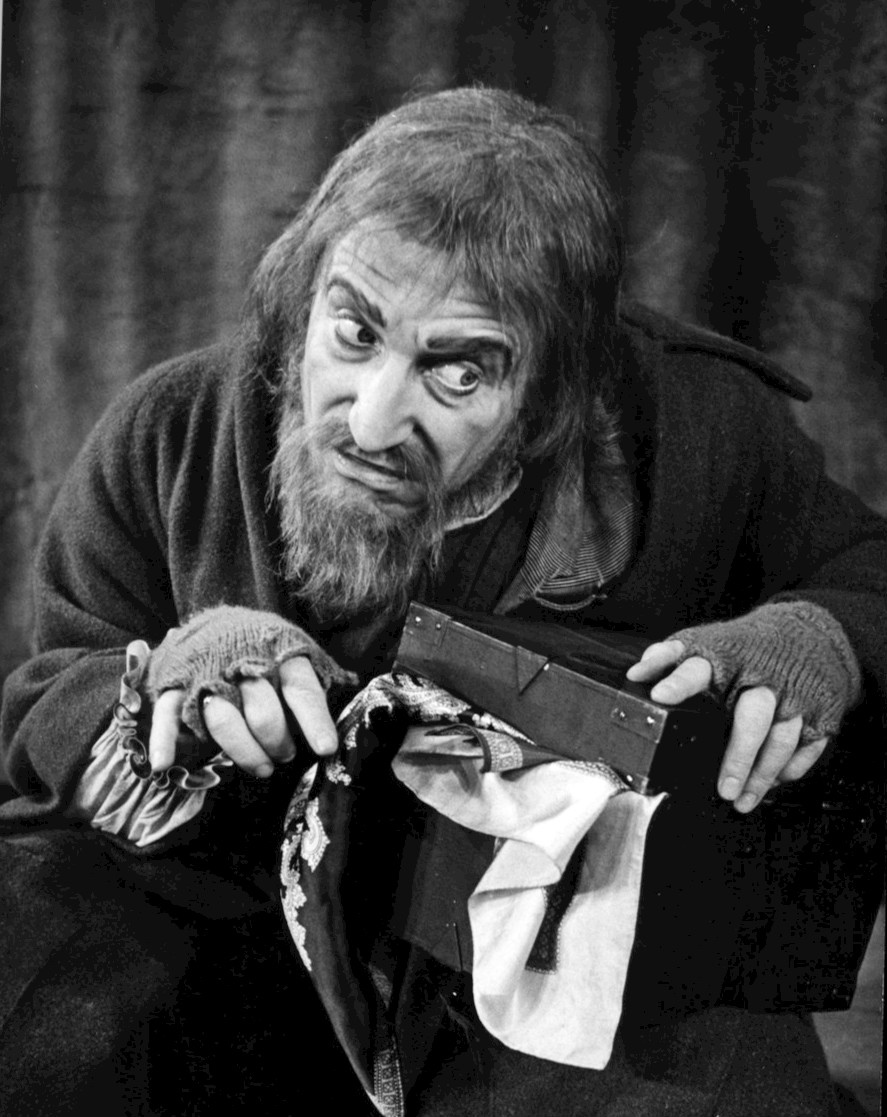
- Revill as Fagin in the 1963 Broadway production of Oliver!
- Born: Clive Selsby Revill; 18 April 1930; Wellington, New Zealand
- Died: 11 March 2025 (aged 94); Sherman Oaks, California, US
- Education: Victoria University of Wellington; Old Vic Theatre School
- Occupations: Actor; singer
- Years active: 1950–2016
- Children: 1

Clive Selsby Revill (18 April 1930 – 11 March 2025) was a New Zealand actor and singer, best known for his performances in musical theatre and the London stage. A veteran of the Royal Shakespeare Company, he also starred in numerous films and television programmes, often in character parts. He was a two-time Tony Award nominee, as Best Featured Actor in a Musical for Irma La Douce and Best Actor in a Musical for Oliver!.

His film work also included voicing Emperor Palpatine in the original theatrical version of The Empire Strikes Back (1980), and roles in Modesty Blaise (1966), The Assassination Bureau (1969), The Private Life of Sherlock Holmes (1970), The Legend of Hell House (1973), and Robin Hood: Men in Tights (1993). Revill was nominated for a Golden Globe Award for Best Supporting Actor for his performance in Billy Wilder's Avanti! (1972). Later in his career, he was active as a voice actor in many animated productions and video games.

== Early life ==
Clive Selsby Revill was born on 18 April 1930 in Wellington, the son of Eleanor May (née Neel) and Malet Barford Revill. He was educated at Rongotai College and Victoria University of Wellington.

== Career ==
=== Stage ===
Revill originally trained to be an accountant in New Zealand, but decided to change his career path in 1950 when he made his stage debut as Sebastian in Twelfth Night. In the same year, he moved to London, where he studied acting at the Old Vic Theatre School. He appeared in The Shakespeare Memorial Theatre Company's celebrated 1956–1958 season of productions in Stratford, which included Hamlet, Love's Labour's Lost, The Merchant of Venice, Julius Caesar and The Tempest. He went on to have such varied stage roles as Bob (narrator) in Irma la Douce, Ratty in Toad of Toad Hall and Jean-Paul Marat in Marat/Sade.

He made his Broadway debut in 1952, playing Sam Weller in The Pickwick Papers, and subsequently appeared in Irma La Douce, The Incomparable Max and Oliver!, for which his Fagin was nominated for a Tony Award. He was also known for his roles in Gilbert and Sullivan operas, on both stage and television. He starred in the first national tour of the musical Drood in 1988, replacing George Rose, who was murdered during the run.

Revill also participated in the workshop production of Tom Jones: The Musical, playing the role of Squire Western and reprising it on the cast recording.

=== Film ===
Revill's red hair and distinctive Mr. Punch-like features often saw him cast as comic eccentrics in a number of British films of the 1960s and 1970s such as Kaleidoscope (1966), Modesty Blaise (1966), The Double Man (1967), Fathom (1967), The Assassination Bureau (1969), A Severed Head (1970), The Black Windmill (1974) and One of Our Dinosaurs Is Missing (1975). He also had notable supporting turns in Otto Preminger's Bunny Lake Is Missing (1965) opposite Laurence Olivier, and his American film debut A Fine Madness (1966), as well as a rare leading role in the horror film The Legend of Hell House (1973).

He was often cast as humorous foreign characters (he has played everything from Chinese to Russian). Two of his highest profile roles of this kind were in two films for Billy Wilder: The Private Life of Sherlock Holmes (1970) and Avanti! (1972), for which he was nominated for a Golden Globe Award for his part as put-upon hotel manager Carlo Carlucci.

He made his final film appearance in the 2016 Spanish film The Queen of Spain, directed by Fernando Trueba.

=== Television ===
In the 1978 television miniseries Centennial, he played the Scottish accountant Finlay Perkin. He played both Ko-Ko (the starring role) in The Mikado (which he had played in 1962 at Sadler's Wells Opera), and the title character, John Wellington Wells, in The Sorcerer, for the Brent Walker television series of Gilbert and Sullivan productions, shown by the BBC in 1983.

After relocating to the United States, he guest-starred in many television series, such as Columbo (1978, "The Conspirators"); Hart to Hart; Dynasty; Magnum, P.I.; The Love Boat (S9 E22 as Slade 1986); Remington Steele; Murder, She Wrote; Babylon 5; The Feather and Father Gang; Newhart; MacGyver; Dear John; The Fall Guy; Maude; and Star Trek: The Next Generation. He starred as the wizard Vector in the short-lived series Wizards and Warriors.

=== Voice work ===
Revill was known for his proficiency with accents. He was also known for his voice work in feature-length films and animated series, which includes Alfred Pennyworth in the first three episodes of Batman: The Animated Series, the voice of Chico in the seven episodes of Chico the Rainmaker (The Boy with the Two Heads) (1974), the voice of Emperor Palpatine/Darth Sidious in the original The Empire Strikes Back (he was replaced by Ian McDiarmid in the 2004 DVD version, though Revill is still credited, to create continuity with Return of the Jedi and the prequel trilogy, as Revill's voice greatly differed from McDiarmid's). Revill has also featured in numerous cartoons such as The Transformers, DuckTales and Midnight Patrol: Adventures in the Dream Zone, along with more video games such as Marvel: Ultimate Alliance and Conquest: Frontier Wars.

== Personal life ==
Revill was married twice and had a daughter, Kate Selsby Revill, with his second wife.

=== Death ===
Revill died of complications from dementia at a Sherman Oaks nursing home, on 11 March 2025, at the age of 94.

== Partial stage credits ==
Year	Title	Role	Venue	Notes
1950	Twelfth Night	Sebastian		
1952	Mr. Pickwick	Sam Weller	Plymouth Theatre	
1955	Listen to the Wind	Pearson	Arts Theatre	
1957	The Tempest	Trinculo	Theatre Royal, Drury Lane	
1957	Toad of Toad Hall	Ratty	Theatre Royal, Drury Lane	
1958–60	Irma La Douce	Bob-Le-Hotu	Lyric Theatre	
1960–61	Irma La Douce	Bob-Le-Hotu	Plymouth Theatre	Nominated–Tony Award for Best Featured Actor in a Musical
1962	The Mikado	Ko-Ko	Sadler's Wells Theatre	
1963–64	Oliver!	Fagin	Imperial Theatre	Nominated–Tony Award for Best Actor in a Musical
1964	Marat/Sade	Jean-Paul Marat	Royal Shakespeare Company	
1964	The Jew of Malta	Barabas	Royal Shakespeare Company	
1967	Sherry!	Sheridan Whiteside	Alvin Theatre	
1968–69	The Unknown Soldier and His Wife	The General	Chichester Festival Theatre	
1968–69	The Tempest	Caliban	Chichester Festival Theatre	
1969	A Who's Who of Flapland		Royal Court Theatre	
1969	A Who's Who of Flapland		Theatre Upstairs	
1971	The Incomparable Max	Max Beerbohm	Royale Theatre	
1974–76	Sherlock Holmes	Professor James Moriarty	Broadhurst Theatre	Replacement
1981	Lolita	Clare Quilty	Brooks Atkinson Theatre	
1981–82	The Pirates of Penzance	Major-General Stanley	Tour	
1988	Drood	William Cartwright, Your Chairman	Tour	

== Filmography ==
=== Film ===
Year	Title	Role	Notes
1956	Reach for the Sky	RAF Medical Orderly	Uncredited
1958	The Horse's Mouth	Art Student	Uncredited
1959	The Headless Ghost	Ambrose Dudley	
1965	Bunny Lake Is Missing	Sgt. Andrews	
1966	A Fine Madness	Dr. Menken	
1966	Italian Secret Service	Charles Harrison	
1966	Kaleidoscope	Inspector McGinnis	
1966	Modesty Blaise	McWhirter, Sheik Abu Tahir	
1967	Fathom	Serapkin	
1967	The Double Man	Frank Wheatly	
1968	Nobody Runs Forever	Joseph	
1968	The Shoes of the Fisherman	Tovarich Vucovich	
1969	The Assassination Bureau	Cesare Spado	
1970	The Buttercup Chain	George	
1970	The Private Life of Sherlock Holmes	Rogozhin	
1970	A Severed Head	Alexander Lynch-Gibbon	
1972	Avanti!	Carlo Carlucci	Nominated – Golden Globe Award for Best Supporting Actor – Motion Picture
1973	The Legend of Hell House	Dr. Barrett	
1974	The Black Windmill	Alf Chestermann	
1974	The Little Prince	The Businessman	
1975	One of Our Dinosaurs Is Missing	Quon	
1976	The Great Houdini	Dundas Slater	
1980	The Empire Strikes Back	The Emperor (voice)	Original theatrical release, replaced by Ian McDiarmid in later releases.
1981	Zorro, The Gay Blade	Garcia	
1986	The Transformers: The Movie	Kickback (voice)	
1986	The Frog Prince	King William	
1987	Alice Through the Looking Glass	Snark, Goat (voice)	
1993	Robin Hood: Men in Tights	Fire Marshall	
1993	The Thief and the Cobbler	King Nod (voice)	
1995	Delta of Venus	Radio Announcer (voice)	
2002	Return to Never Land	Elderly Officer, Narrator (voices)	
2003	101 Dalmatians II: Patch's London Adventure	Additional voices	
2004	Mickey's Twice Upon a Christmas	Narrator (voice)	
2012	Tom and Jerry: Robin Hood and His Merry Mouse	King Richard, Referee (voices)	
2016	The Queen of Spain	John Scott	

=== Television ===
Year	Title	Role	Notes				
1957	The Adventures of Robin Hood	Horatio	Episode: "Too Many Earls"				
1975	Churchill's People	King Henry II	Episode: "A Sprig of Broom"				
1977	The New Avengers	Mark	Episode: "Dead Men are Dangerous"				
1978	Play for Today	John Fennel	Episode: "Licking Hitler"				
1978	Columbo	Joe Devlin	Episode: "The Conspirators"				
1978	Centennial	Finlay Perkin	3 episodes				
1982	Harts on their Toes	Zabin	1 episode				
1983	Wizards and Warriors	Wizard Vector	8 episodes				
1984	George Washington	Lord Loudoun	3 episodes	1984 Faerie Tale Theatre The Emperor's New Clothes	Snorks	Dr. Galio Seaworthy (voice)	65 episodes
1984	1985, 1988	Murder, She Wrote	Jonathan Hawley, Bert Davies	2 episodes			
1984	Alvin and the Chipmunks	Additional voices	13 episodes				
1984	The New Scooby and Scrappy-Doo Show	Additional voices	Episode: "Happy Birthday, Scooby-Doo"				
1984	Dragon's Lair	Storyteller (voice)	Episode: "Tale of the Enchanted Gift"				
1984–86	The Transformers	Kickback (voice)	5 episodes				
1986	The Twilight Zone	Agent	Episode: "Personal Demons"				
1986	Magnum PI	Walter "Inky" Gilbert	Episode: "I Never Wanted To Go to France, Anyway"				
1986	Pound Puppies	Dumas, Lord Belveshire (voice)	2 episodes				
1987	Mighty Mouse: The New Adventures	Additional voices	6 episodes				
1987	DuckTales	Shedlock Jones (voice)	Episode: "Dr. Jekyll & Mr. McDuck"				
1987	The Law & Harry McGraw	Oscar Wendell	Episode: "She's Not Wild About Harry"				
1988	Alfred Hitchcock Presents	Hector	Episode: "Twist"				
1989–90	Paddington Bear	Additional voices	2 episodes				
1990	Midnight Patrol: Adventures in the Dream Zone	Potsworth (voice)	13 episodes				
1990	Tiny Toon Adventures	William Shakespeare (voice)	Episode: "Weirdest Story Ever Told"				
1991	Star Trek: The Next Generation	Sir Guy of Gisborne	Episode: "Qpid"				
1991–93	The Legend of Prince Valiant	The Mighty Om (voice)	3 episodes				
1992	Batman: The Animated Series	Alfred Pennyworth (voice)	3 episodes				
1993	The Little Mermaid	Sorcerer Blowfish (voice)	2 episodes				
1993	The Sea Wolf	Thomas C. "Cookie" Mugridge					
1994	Babylon 5	Trakis	Episode: "Born to the Purple"				
1995–97	Freakazoid!	Lyle Spanger, Baffeardin, Hermil Sioro (voices)	3 episodes				
1996	Murphy Brown	Hendricks	Episode: "When a Lansing Loves a Woman"				
1996	Adventures from the Book of Virtues	King Midas, Minister (voice)	Episode: "Self-Discipline"				
1996	The Real Adventures of Jonny Quest	Hunter, Trench Harpooner, Medical Officer (voices)	2 episodes				
1996	Lois & Clark: The New Adventures of Superman	Sorcerer	Episode: "Soul Mates"				
1997	Step by Step	Professor Robert Nesler	Episode: "Talking Trash"				
1997	Johnny Bravo	W (voice)	Episode: "Bravo, James Bravo"				
1998	Pinky and the Brain	King Claudius (voice)	Episode: "Melancholy Brain"				
1998	Godzilla: The Series	Hustus McPhil (voice)	Episode: "DeadLoch"				
1999	Oh Yeah! Cartoons	Herb, New Guy, Security Guy (voices)	Episode: "Herb"				
2002	Fillmore!	Shop Owner (voice)	Episode: "The Currency of Doubt"				
2004	All Grown Up!	Moderator (voice)	Episode: "Susie's Choice"				
2011–12	Secret Mountain Fort Awesome	Helmet Head, Wise One (voices)	3 episodes				

=== Video games ===
Year	Title	Role	Notes
1993	Star Wars: X-Wing	General Dodonna	
1995	The Jungle Book	Bagheera	
1996	Down in the Dumps	Bad Punk, Friar Tuck, Prince John	
1996	Star Wars: X-Wing vs. TIE Fighter	Imperial Officer #2	Credited as Clive Revel
2001	Conquest: Frontier Wars	Hawkes	
2003	The Hobbit	Thorin Oakenshield	
2004	The Bard's Tale		
2006	Gothic 3	Rhobar	English dub
2006	Marvel: Ultimate Alliance	Doctor Doom	
2007	Jeanne d'Arc	Duke of Bedford	English dub
2007	Pirates of the Caribbean: At World's End	British Officers	
2009	Transformers: Revenge of the Fallen	Jetfire	
2011	Star Wars: The Old Republic	Admiral Davos, Admiral Riserre, Darth Gravus	
