= Jo Ann Pflug =

American actress

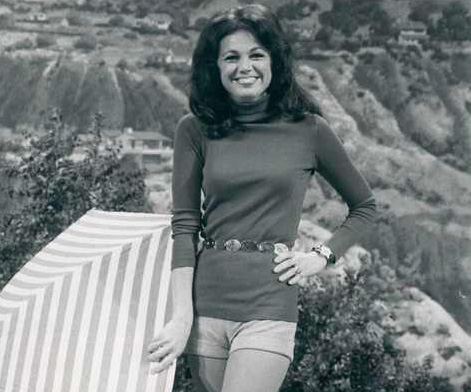
- Pflug in Rowan & Martin's Laugh-In in 1972
- Born: May 2, 1940 (age 86)
- Other name: JoAnn Pflug
- Education: University of Miami (BA in broadcasting)
- Occupation: Actress
- Years active: 1966–2011
- Spouses: Chuck Woolery (m. 1972; div. 1980); Charles Stuck Young (m. 1988)
- Children: 1

Jo Ann Pflug (born May 2, 1940) is a retired American film and television actress.

== Early life and education ==
Pflug was born to J. Lynn and Kelly Pflug. She was raised in Winter Park, Florida, where her father was elected mayor in 1958 and she graduated from Winter Park High School.

Pflug attended the University of Miami, where she received her BA in broadcasting and her minor in American history.

== Career ==
While at the University of Miami, Pflug hosted a weekly radio show called "The Magic Carpet", where she was the storyteller. Following that, for four years she hosted a weekly live interview talk show called Montage. Her background in interviewing led her to be the first woman to have a live weekly TV talk show in the late 1960s in Los Angeles on KHJ-TV, channel 9. Her first screen credit was in Cyborg 2087, released in 1966. She was also the voice of Invisible Girl in the 1967 animated version of The Fantastic Four.

Pflug's first major role was as U.S. Army nurse Lt. Maria "Dish" Schneider in the 1970 film M*A*S*H. Also in 1970, she starred in the "To Carry the Sun in a Golden Cup" episode of Marcus Welby, M.D. in which she played an ailing nurse.

She appeared in Catlow (1971) with Yul Brynner, Where Does It Hurt? (1972) starring Peter Sellers, and as Lt. Katherine O'Hara in the television series spin-off of Operation Petticoat (1979).

Pflug co-starred in the made-for-television movie The Night Strangler (1973), a sequel to the movie The Night Stalker (1972), and a precursor of the TV series Kolchak: The Night Stalker (1974–75). She starred in the TV werewolf movie Scream of the Wolf (1974) alongside Peter Graves and Clint Walker.

Pflug was a frequent panelist on the television game show Match Game from 1973 until 1981, a co-host with Allen Funt on the 1970s version of Candid Camera, and a regular in the TV series The Fall Guy for the 1981–1982 season.

In 1984, she was the first actress to play Taylor Chapin in the syndicated soap opera Rituals. She made guest appearances on McCloud; The Love Boat; CHiPs; The Dukes of Hazzard; One Day at a Time; Knight Rider; Love, American Style; Adam-12; Quincy, M.E.; Alias Smith and Jones; Charlie's Angels; and The Colbys.

Later roles include Boss Jack's wife in Traveller (1997) and Cynthia Vaughn in Midnight in the Garden of Good and Evil (1997).

In 2011, she interviewed Pat Boone, Shirley MacLaine, and other celebrities for The Jo Ann Pflug Show on Seaview Radio.

== Personal life ==
Pflug married American game and talk show host Chuck Woolery in 1972 at the Knowles Memorial Chapel at Rollins College in Orlando, Florida. They had a daughter, Melissa. The couple divorced in 1980.

She married Charles Stuck Young in 1988.

== Filmography ==
Year	Title	Role	Notes
1966	Cyborg 2087	Woman in Control Booth	
1970	M*A*S*H	Lt. 'Dish'	
1971	Catlow	Christina	
1972	Where Does It Hurt?	Alice Gilligan	
1973	The Night Strangler	Louise Harper	
1974	Scream of the Wolf	Sandy Miller	
1979	Charlie’s Angels	Barbara Kay	
1997	Traveller	Boss Jack's Wife	
1997	Midnight in the Garden of Good and Evil	Cynthia Vaughn	
