= The Shootist =

1976 Western film by Don Siegel

- Theatrical release poster by Richard Amsel
- Directed by: Don Siegel
- Screenplay by: Miles Hood Swarthout; Scott Hale
- Based on: The Shootist (1975 novel) by Glendon Swarthout
- Produced by: M. J. Frankovich; William Self
- Starring: John Wayne; Lauren Bacall; Ron Howard; James Stewart; Richard Boone; John Carradine; Scatman Crothers; Richard Lenz; Harry Morgan; Sheree North; Hugh O'Brian
- Cinematography: Bruce Surtees
- Edited by: Douglas Stewart
- Music by: Elmer Bernstein
- Distributed by: Paramount Pictures (USA/UK); Dino De Laurentiis Company (International)
- Release date: July 21, 1976
- Running time: 100 minutes
- Country: United States
- Language: English
- Box office: $13.4 million

The Shootist is a 1976 American Western film directed by Don Siegel. It stars John Wayne in his last film appearance before his death in 1979, along with Lauren Bacall, Ron Howard, James Stewart, Richard Boone, John Carradine, Scatman Crothers, Rick Lenz, Harry Morgan, Sheree North, and Hugh O'Brian. The film is based on Glendon Swarthout's 1975 novel, written for the screen by Miles Hood Swarthout (the son of the author) and Scott Hale.

The film was released by Paramount Pictures on July 21, 1976. It was both a critical and commercial success. The Shootist received an Oscar nomination for Best Art Direction (Robert F. Boyle, Arthur Jeph Parker), a BAFTA Film Award nomination for Best Actress (Lauren Bacall), and a Golden Globe Award nomination for Best Supporting Actor (Ron Howard), as well as the National Board of Review Award as one of the Top Ten Films of 1976.

== Plot ==
Widely known Old West Sheriff-turned-gunfighter John Bernard "J. B." Books arrives in Carson City, Nevada, on January 22, 1901. Books visits Dr. E. W. Hostetler, a country physician who treated Books' gunshot wounds 15 years before. Hostetler confirms that Books has terminal cancer and has only weeks to live. Hostetler prescribes laudanum for the pain, but advises that his condition will eventually become unbearable, remarking that if he had Books's courage, the death he has just described is not one he would choose.

Books lodges at a quiet boarding house owned by Bond Rogers, a widow who lives with her young adult son, Gillom. Wanting to be left alone, Books gives her a fake name. Gillom deduces his true identity and tells his mother. Upset that Books has lied, Bond summons Marshal Walter Thibido. Books assures him he will be dead soon. Sympathetic to his plight, Bond asks Books to accompany her to church. Books claims he has no need of repentance, saying he never harmed anyone who did not deserve it.

Word spreads about Books' presence in town and the state of his health. Local journalist Dan Dobkins is chased off when he asks Books for an interview. Books' old flame, Serepta, arrives and admits that Dobkins approached her to write a "biography" of Books filled with exaggerated stories of his gunfights. Books orders a headstone, but rejects the undertaker's offer of a free funeral, suspecting he would charge admission to view his remains. The local barber sweeps up Books' hair following a haircut, intending to sell the remnants. Later, two criminals try to ambush Books as he sleeps, but he kills them. Gillom is impressed, but his mother is concerned that Gillom will try to follow in Books' footsteps as the two grow closer.

Books asks Gillom to visit three men with violent reputations: Mike Sweeney, the aging outlaw brother of a man Books killed in self-defense; Jack Pulford, the faro dealer at the Metropole saloon, a deadly crack shot; and Jay Cobb, Gillom's boss. He is to tell each that Books will be at the Metropole at 11:00 am on January 29, his birthday. On the morning of that day, the headstone arrives. It includes Books' death year as 1901, but with no month or day. Books gives Gillom his beloved horse, Dollar, bids farewell to Bond, and then boards a trolley for the saloon.

Books enters the saloon to find the three men at different tables. Books orders a drink, toasting his birthday and his three guests. Sweeney, Cobb, and Pulford separately each try to kill Books. Despite being shot in the arm, he kills them. A crowd gathers in the street, having heard the gunshots. Gillom arrives and warns Books too late, as the Metropole's bartender shoots Books in the back, mortally wounding him. Gillom takes up Books' gun and kills the bartender. Realizing what he has done, Gillom throws the gun away. Books smiles before dying, approving of Gillom choosing not to follow his ways. Dr. Hostetler arrives and views the scene as Gillom covers Books' body with his coat. Gillom walks silently past the doctor, and outside to his waiting mother.

== Cast ==
- John Wayne as J. B. Books
- Lauren Bacall as Bond Rogers
- Ron Howard as Gillom Rogers
- James Stewart as Dr. E. W. "Doc" Hostetler
- Richard Boone as Mike Sweeney, an aging outlaw
- Hugh O'Brian as Jack Pulford, faro dealer at the Metropol Saloon
- Bill McKinney as Jay Cobb, owner of a local creamery
- Harry Morgan as Town Marshal Walter Thibido
- John Carradine as Beckum, the undertaker
- Sheree North as Serepta, an old flame of Books'
- Richard Lenz as Dan Dobkins, reporter
- Scatman Crothers as Moses, the blacksmith
- Gregg Palmer as Burly Man
- Alfred Dennis as Barber
- Dick Winslow as Streetcar Driver
- Melody Thomas as Girl on Streetcar
- Kathleen O'Malley as School Teacher
- Charles G. Martin as Murray, the bartender

== Production ==
Glendon Swarthout's 1975 novel had won the Western Writers of America's Spur Award for Best Western Novel.

Producer Mike Frankovich announced that he had purchased the movie rights to Glendon Swarthout's novel The Shootist, and Wayne expressed a strong desire to play the title role, reportedly because of similarities to the character Jimmy Ringo in The Gunfighter, a role that he had turned down 26 years earlier. He was not initially considered due to the health and stamina issues that he had experienced during filming of Rooster Cogburn. Paul Newman passed on the role, as did George C. Scott, Charles Bronson, Gene Hackman, and Clint Eastwood, before it was finally offered to Wayne. His compromised lung capacity made breathing and mobility difficult at Carson City's 4,600 ft (1,400 m) altitude, and production had to be shut down for a week while he recovered from influenza, but Wayne completed the filming without further significant medical issues.

The Shootist was Wayne's final cinematic role, concluding a 50-year career that began during the silent film era in 1926. Wayne was not terminally ill when the film was made in 1976. He had been a heavy cigarette smoker for most of his life, and he was diagnosed with lung cancer in 1964. It is also believed that Wayne may have contracted cancer as a result of working on the 1956 film The Conqueror, which was filmed downwind of a nuclear testing site. He underwent surgical removal of his left lung and several ribs. He remained clinically cancer-free until early 1979, when metastases were discovered in his stomach, intestines, and spine; he died in June of that year. Nonetheless, Wayne appeared in a televised public service announcement for the American Cancer Society that began with the scene in which his character is informed of his cancer. Wayne then added that he had enacted the same scene in real life 12 years earlier.

The film's outdoor scenes were filmed on location in Carson City. Bond Rogers' boarding house is the 1914 Krebs-Peterson House, located in Carson City's historic residential district. The buggy ride was shot at Washoe Lake State Park, in the Washoe Valley between Reno and Carson City. It was a Paramount production, yet the street scenes and most interior shots were filmed at the Warner Bros. backlot and sound stages in Burbank, California. The horse-drawn trolley was once used as a shuttle between El Paso and Juarez, Mexico.

Wayne's contract gave him script approval, and he made a number of major and minor changes, including moving the location from El Paso to Carson City and the ending. In the book and original screenplay, Books kills his last opponent by shooting him in the back, is fatally wounded by a bartender with a shotgun, and is finally put out of his misery by Gillom. Wayne maintained that over his entire film career, he had never shot an adversary in the back and would not do so now. He also objected to his character being killed by Gillom and suggested that the bartender do it, because "no one could ever take John Wayne in a fair fight".

Wayne was also responsible for many casting decisions. Several friends and past co-stars were cast at his request, including Bacall, Stewart, Boone, and Carradine. James Stewart had not worked in films for a number of years, due in part to a severe hearing impairment, but he accepted the role as a favor to Wayne. Stewart and Wayne had worked together in two previous Westerns: The Man Who Shot Liberty Valance and How the West Was Won, both released in 1962.

While filming the sequence in the doctor's office, both Stewart and Wayne repeatedly muffed their lines over a long series of takes, until director Don Siegel finally pleaded with them to try harder. "If you want the scene done better," joked Wayne, "you'd better get yourself a couple of better actors." Later, Wayne commented in private that Stewart knew his lines, but apparently could not hear his cues.

Another casting stipulation was using the horse owned and given away by Wayne's character, a favorite sorrel Quarter Horse gelding named Dollar (or sometimes Dollor) that Wayne had ridden in Big Jake, The Cowboys, True Grit, Rooster Cogburn, Chisum, and The Train Robbers. Wayne had negotiated exclusive movie rights to Dollar with the horse's owner, Dick Webb Movie Productions, and he requested script changes enabling him to mention Dollor's name several times.

By one account, Wayne's numerous directorial suggestions and script alterations caused considerable friction between director and star, but Siegel said that Wayne and he got along well.

He had plenty of his own ideas ... some I liked, which gave me inspirations, and some I didn't like. But we didn't fight over any of it. We liked each other and respected each other.

== Reception ==
=== Box office ===
Upon its theatrical release, The Shootist was a modest success, grossing $13,406,138 domestically, About $6 million were earned in American theatrical rentals.

=== Critical response ===
It was named one of the Ten Best Films of 1976 by the National Board of Review, along with Rocky, All the President's Men, and Network. Film critic Roger Ebert of the Chicago Sun-Times ranked The Shootist number 10 on his list of the 10 best films of 1976. The film was nominated for an Oscar (for Best Art Direction, today called Best Production Design), a Golden Globe, a BAFTA film award, and a Writers Guild of America award. The film has an 81% rating on the review aggregator website Rotten Tomatoes, based on 26 reviews. In 2008 the film was nominated by the American Film Institute as one of the best Western films.

In 2020, filmmaker Quentin Tarantino wrote:

There’s nothing in The Shootist you haven’t seen done many times before and done better … but what you haven’t seen before is a dying John Wayne give his last performance. And it’s Wayne’s performance, and the performances of some of the surrounding characters (Howard, Richard Boone, Harry Morgan, and Sheree North) that make The Shootist not the classic it wants to be, but memorable nonetheless.

=== Awards and nominations ===
Award	Year	Category	Nominee(s)	Result
Academy Awards	1977	Best Art Direction - Set Decoration	Robert F. Boyle, Arthur Jeph Parker	Nominated
BAFTA Award	1977	Best Leading Actress	Lauren Bacall	Nominated
Golden Globe Awards	1977	Best Supporting Actor	Ron Howard	Nominated
Writers Guild of America Awards	1977	Best Adapted Screenplay	Scott Hale, Miles Hood Swarthout	Nominated
National Board of Review Awards	1976	Top Ten Films	The Shootist	Won

Also in 2008, the American Film Institute nominated this film for its Top 10 Western Films list.

== See also ==
- John Wayne filmography
