= Meyer Kupferman =

American composer and clarinetist

Meyer Kupferman (July 3, 1926 – November 26, 2003) was an American composer and clarinetist.

== Life ==
Meyer Kupferman was born in New York City to Jewish parents. A self-taught composer, Kupferman first gained attention in the late 1940s when his early opera "In A Garden" was premiered at the Tanglewood and Edinburgh Festivals. From 1951 to 1993 he was on the faculty of Sarah Lawrence College. He also served as Chairman of the Music Department for five terms.

Kupferman began music at the age of five on violin. As an adult he claimed little memory of his violin instruction, but at age 10 he began to play the clarinet. He taught himself piano and studied music theory at The High School of Music & Art in New York City, subsequently attending Queens College in New York.

As a young man Kupferman played jazz in bars and clubs on Coney Island, and arranged for big bands. In 1951 he was hired as Professor of Composition and Chamber Music at Sarah Lawrence College, a position he held until 1994. In the 1950s he began to experiment with twelve-tone row techniques, and in 1961 devised his "Infinities Row," consisting of the group of notes of G–F–A♭–B–B♭–D–F♯–E–C–E♭–A–C♯, which would become the only tone row he used subsequently in his major works. In 1990 he published Atonal Jazz.

Much of Kupferman's music contains large gestures and short dramatic hooks which are a critical to his compositional technique (his "gestalt form"). His works are eclectic syntheses of disparate elements. Their extremes of contrast, and outrageousness were reflections of his personal life.

Kupferman resided in Rhinebeck, New York, where he and his wife Pei-Fen welcomed members of the community. On the day before Thanksgiving, November 26, 2003, he died of heart failure.

== Compositions for Percussion ==
- "A Crucible for the Moon" - Percussion Sextet; Voice; Saxophone
- "Flavors of the Stars" - Percussion (2)
- "Little Fantasia" - Percussion Quartet & Piano (published by Media Press Inc.)
- "Moonjazz, Babyface" - Drum Set; Cello
- "Moonsticks" - Marimba
- "Percussion Symphony: On Tibet and Tienanmen Square" - Percussion Sextet
- "Poetics" - Vibraphone; Amplified Guitar
- "Prometheus" - Percussion Sextet
- "Sitting Bull" - Vibraphone; Trumpet
- "Sound Phantoms #5" - Percussion (8)
- "Sound Phantoms #7" - Percussion; Saxophone
- "Sound Phantoms #9" - Percussion Quartet; Flute; String Bass
- "The Stone Tears of Ixtaccihuatl" - Timpani

== Selected discography ==
- "ORIGINS2: forgotten percussion works, vol. 2", Percussion Art Ensemble, directed by Ron Coulter, (Kreating SounD KSD 18, December 2020), includes Kupferman's "Little Fantasia" for piano & four percussionists

== Filmography ==
- Blast of Silence (1961)
