= Where Does It Hurt? =

1972 American comedy film

- Directed by: Rod Amateau
- Screenplay by: Rod Amateau
- Based on: Novel by Rod Amateau; Budd Robinson
- Produced by: Rod Amateau; William Schwartz executive Joseph Shaftel
- Starring: Peter Sellers; Jo Ann Pflug; Rick Lenz; Pat Morita; Harold Gould
- Cinematography: Brick Marquard
- Edited by: Mario Morra; Stanley Rabjohn
- Music by: Keith Allison
- Production company: Josef Shaftel Productions Inc.
- Distributed by: Cinerama Releasing Corporation
- Release date: September 29, 1972 (US)
- Running time: 87 minutes
- Country: United States
- Language: English
- Box office: $1.7 million

Where Does it Hurt? is a 1972 American comedy film written and directed by Rod Amateau and starring Peter Sellers, Jo Ann Pflug, Rick Lenz, Pat Morita, and Harold Gould. The film is a darkly satirical look at capitalism in a hospital environment.

== Plot ==
Sellers plays hospital administrator Albert T. Hopfnagel, who oversees a facility that is more interested in generating revenue than it is in providing sound medical care.

When construction worker Lester Hammond shows up needing nothing more than a chest X-ray, he is immediately admitted and subjected to a battery of tests. Hopfnagel rides the staff to perform more unnecessary surgeries and pad patient bills, while making time with multiple female staff members. When Hopfnagel finally ends up in jail for his devious deeds, he plots a revenge in which he will return to the hospital as a patient and be given an unnecessary operation that he can then sue the hospital over. But the plan backfires.

== Cast ==
- Peter Sellers as Hopfnagel
- Jo Ann Pflug as Alice Gilligan
- Rick Lenz as Lester Hammond
- Harold Gould as Dr. Zerny
- Pat Morita as Nishimoto
- Kathleen Freeman as Mrs. Mazzini
- Jean Byron as Dr. Kincaid

== Production ==
Finance was provided entirely by Hemdale.

The film was announced in June 1971. Filming started in July 1971 in Los Angeles.

== Reception ==
TV Guide describes the film by writing, “The language is profane, the proceedings inane, and the story insane…If you hate doctors, Mexicans, homosexuals, blacks, females, Catholics, Jews, Italians, Japanese, insurance companies, hospitals, Poles, and humanity, you'll love this movie.” Nonetheless, the film holds a 64% fresh rating, based on 144 reviews, on Rotten Tomatoes.

== See also ==
- List of American films of 1972
