= Jean-Pierre Gredy =

French playwright and writer (1920–2022)

Jean-Pierre Grédy
- Born: 16 August 1920; Alexandria, Egypt
- Died: 6 February 2022 (aged 101); France
- Occupation: Playwright

Jean-Pierre Grédy, often anglicised as Gredy (16 August 1920 – 6 February 2022) was a French playwright.

== Biography ==
After studying literature and law, Grédy entered IDHEC because he wanted to write screenplays.

He wrote the screenplay for the film Julie de Carneilhan, based on a 1941 novel by the French writer Colette, directed by Jacques Manuel and starring Edwige Feuillère. He then met Pierre Barillet with whom he wrote "for fun" Le Don d'Adèle, which was an unexpected success, exceeding a thousand performances and receiving the Tristan-Bernard prize. Over the next several decades, Grédy and Barillet wrote more than 20 plays together. Certain of their plays were adapted to Broadway, including Fleur de cactus (Cactus Flower, written by Abe Burrows) and Quarante carats (Forty Carats).

Grédy died on 6 February 2022, at the age of 101.

== Works ==
=== Film adaptations (selected) ===
- Le Don d'Adèle, directed by Émile Couzinet (France, 1951, based on the play Le Don d'Adèle)
- Les femmes sont marrantes, directed by André Hunebelle (France, 1958, based on the play Ami-ami)
- Cactus Flower, directed by Gene Saks (USA, 1969, based on the play Fleur de cactus)
- 40 Carats, directed by Milton Katselas (USA, 1973, based on the play Quarante carats)
- Potiche, directed by François Ozon (France, 2010, based on the play Potiche)
- Just Go with It, directed by Dennis Dugan (USA, 2011, based on the play Fleur de cactus)

=== Screenwriter ===
- Beauties of the Night (dir. René Clair, 1952)
