= The Private Life of Sherlock Holmes =

1970 film

- 1970 film poster by Robert McGinnis
- Directed by: Billy Wilder
- Written by: I. A. L. Diamond; Billy Wilder
- Produced by: I. A. L. Diamond; Billy Wilder
- Starring: Robert Stephens; Geneviève Page; Colin Blakely; Christopher Lee
- Cinematography: Christopher Challis
- Edited by: Ernest Walter
- Music by: Miklós Rózsa
- Production companies: Compton Films; The Mirisch Corporation; Phalanx Productions
- Distributed by: United Artists
- Release dates: 29 October 1970 (New York); 3 December 1970 (UK)
- Running time: 125 minutes
- Countries: United Kingdom; United States
- Language: English
- Budget: $10 million (est.)

The Private Life of Sherlock Holmes is a 1970 DeLuxe Color film in Panavision written and produced by Billy Wilder and I. A. L. Diamond, and directed by Wilder. Starring Robert Stephens as Holmes and Colin Blakely as Doctor Watson, the film offers an affectionate, slightly parodic look at Sherlock Holmes, and draws a distinction between the "real" Holmes and the character portrayed by Watson in his stories for The Strand magazine.

== Plot ==
The film is divided into two separate, unequal stories. In the first and shorter of the two, in August 1887 Holmes is approached by Rogozhin, on behalf of a famous Russian ballerina, Madame Petrova. Madame Petrova is about to retire, and wishes to have a child. She proposes that Holmes be the father, one who she hopes will inherit her beauty and his intellect. Holmes manages to extricate himself by claiming that Watson is his lover, much to the doctor's embarrassment. Back at 221B, Watson confronts Holmes about the reality of the ensuing rumours, and Holmes only states that Watson is "being presumptuous" by asking Holmes whether he has had relationships with women.

In the main plot, a Belgian woman, Gabrielle Valladon, is fished out of the River Thames and brought to Baker Street. She begs Holmes to find her missing engineer husband. The resulting investigation leads to the shores of Loch Ness. Along the way, they encounter a group of monks and some dwarfs, and Watson apparently sights the Loch Ness monster. They see canaries and sulphuric acid being carried into a castle undergoing renovation, and conclude that the canaries are used to detect chlorine gas produced when the sulphuric acid is mixed with sea water.

It turns out that Sherlock's brother Mycroft is involved in building a submersible for the Royal Navy, assisted by M. Valladon, who has developed an air pump that is vital for the success of the project. When taken out for testing, the craft was disguised as the monster. The dwarfs were recruited as crewmen because they took up less space and needed less air. When they meet, Mycroft informs Sherlock that his client is actually a top German spy, Ilse von Hoffmanstal, sent to steal the air-pump. The "monks" are German sailors.

Queen Victoria arrives to inspect and launch the vessel, but objects to its unsportsmanlike nature. She orders the exasperated Mycroft to destroy it, so he conveniently leaves it unguarded for the monks to take (rigging it to sink when it is submerged). Fräulein von Hoffmanstal is arrested, to be exchanged for a British spy arrested elsewhere.

In the final scene some months later, Sherlock receives a message from his brother, telling him that von Hoffmanstal had been arrested as a spy in Japan, and subsequently executed by firing squad. Devastated, the detective retreats to his room to seek solace in a 7% solution of cocaine.

== Cast ==
- Robert Stephens as Sherlock Holmes
- Colin Blakely as Dr. John H. Watson
- Irene Handl as Mrs. Hudson
- Stanley Holloway as Gravedigger
- Catherine Lacey as Woman in Wheelchair
- Christopher Lee as Mycroft Holmes
- Geneviève Page as Gabrielle Valladon / Ilse von Hoffmanstal
- Clive Revill as Rogozhin
- Tamara Toumanova as Madame Petrova
- Mollie Maureen as Queen Victoria
- Peter Madden as Von Tirpitz
- Michael Balfour as Cabby
- James Copeland as Guide
- Alex McCrindle as Baggageman
- John Garrie as First Carter
- Godfrey James as Second Carter
- Frank Thornton as Porter
- Robert Cawdron as Hotel Manager
- Paul Hansard as Monk
- Jenny Hanley as a prostitute (scene deleted)
- Graham Armitage as Wiggins (uncredited)
- Ina De La Haye as Petrova's Maid (uncredited)
- George Benson as Inspector Lestrade (uncredited)

== Production ==
=== Casting ===
Billy Wilder, a long time Holmesian, had long aspired to create a musical adaptation of the Sherlock Holmes stories. After two failed attempts in 1955 and 1963, he decided to embark on a non-musical screenplay with collaborator I. A. L. Diamond.

Initially, Wilder planned to cast Peter O'Toole as Holmes and Peter Sellers as Watson. Nicol Williamson, who went on to play Holmes in The Seven-Per-Cent Solution, was also considered for Holmes. Rex Harrison pursued the role but Wilder wasn't interested.

James Robertson Justice was offered the role of Mycroft Holmes but refused to shave off his beard. Christopher Lee took the part after George Sanders' failing health removed him from the role. Lee was eternally grateful to Wilder for allowing him to take the part since it helped his career and he was able to end being consigned to horror movies.

=== Filming ===
Elaborate sets were built on the backlot at Pinewood Studios, including 150 yards of the Baker Street set, at a cost of £80,000. The reproduction of the Diogenes Club stood until 1973 having been used in other films such as Hands of the Ripper and Carry On at Your Convenience. The sets were designed by art director Alexandre Trauner.

The scenes set in Scotland were filmed on location at Urquhart Castle on the banks of Loch Ness; Kilmartin Hall on Loch Meiklie; Nairn railway station. The cemetery scene with Stanley Holloway was filmed at the Church of St Mary, Winkfield in Berkshire. Somerset House in London and the London Coliseum were also used as locations. Castle Stuart and Eilean Donan Castle in Scotland and Broadway Tower in Worcestershire made fleeting appearances.

=== Cut scenes ===
The first cut of the film ran approximately three hours and twenty minutes. As a result, large portions were deleted. The following scenes were all filmed, but were cut from the final release at the studio's insistence. What remained of them was recovered and restored for the film's LaserDisc release. None of the scenes survive in their complete form, with both film footage and audio.

The deleted scenes include:

- A modern-day prologue in which Dr. Watson's grandson, also Dr. Watson (a Canadian veterinarian), also played by Colin Blakely, visits a London bank to claim his grandfather's belongings. The head of the bank, Havelock-Smith, (John Williams) brings Dr. Watson his grandfather's strongbox, which contains items of Holmes and Watson's, along with a number of unpublished stories. (This scene is entirely lost, only production stills and the script survive.)
- The prologue then transitioned into the 1887 portion of the film. We meet Holmes and Watson as they journey back to London by train, having just solved a case in Yorkshire. A disheveled man rushes into their compartment, and promptly falls asleep. Based on numerous clues, Holmes deduces that the man is an Italian music teacher who was having an affair with the wife of a nobleman, got caught, jumped out the window, and ran onto the train. This scene transitioned into their arrival at 221B Baker Street, as seen in the finished film. (Only the audio for this scene survives, along with production stills.)
- "The Curious Case of the Upside Down Room" - Inspector Lestrade visits Holmes and Watson and asks for help solving the seemingly impossible case of a corpse found in a room that was discovered entirely upside-down, with furniture on the ceiling. The three of them visit the scene of the crime, where Holmes inspects the clues. Back at home, Holmes deduces that Watson staged the whole thing in an attempt to pique Holmes' interest, drag his friend out of a deep depression and wean him away from cocaine. Watson is furious that his ruse has been discovered and that his friend intends to continue using drugs. He threatens to move out, but Holmes destroys his vials of cocaine. Watson agrees to stay, and we realize that the vials Holmes destroyed were empty, he has hidden the full vials in his violin case. (Only the audio for this sequence survives, along with production stills.)
- "The Adventure of the Dumbfounded Detective" - During the scene in the film where Holmes is traveling by train to Scotland with Gabrielle, there was originally a segue into a flashback, where he told her about his student days at Oxford. Holmes had fallen in love with a beautiful girl from afar. After Holmes's crew team won a race against Cambridge, to celebrate, they pooled their money and held a lottery, with the winner getting time with a prostitute (Jenny Hanley). Holmes won, but was nervous, because he did not want to sully his love for the girl he had seen. Then the prostitute turned around, and he realized that she was that same girl. Holmes tells Gabrielle that this episode taught him emotional involvement was not worth the risk for someone in his position. (This scene is entirely lost, only production stills and the script survive.)
- "The Dreadful Business of the Naked Honeymooners" - As Holmes and Watson travel back to England on an ocean liner, having solved a case for the Sultan in Constantinople, Holmes complains that anyone could have solved the case, even Watson. When a murder is discovered on board, Holmes tells Watson to attempt to solve the case himself. Holmes watches, without saying anything, as Watson proceeds to go to the wrong cabin, where he finds a honeymooning couple (Nicole Shelby and Jonathan Cecil) passed out drunk, naked, in bed. Mistaking them for the murder victims, Watson begins to deduce an elaborate solution based on the "evidence" he sees around him, while Holmes listens, amused. When the lovers wake up, Holmes tells Watson he has gone to the wrong cabin, and Watson decides not to try to solve a case again. (Only the film footage for this sequence survives, the audio is lost.)
- An epilogue scene, immediately after Holmes retreats into his room to use cocaine on learning of the death of Gabrielle/Ilse, in which Inspector Lestrade arrives at 221B Baker Street and asks Watson for Holmes's help in solving the ongoing Jack the Ripper murders. Watson regretfully says that Holmes is busy and must decline. Lestrade assures Watson that Scotland Yard can solve the case without Holmes. (Only the audio for this scene survives.)
- Another deleted scene involved Rogozhin arriving at 221B Baker Street to give Holmes the Stradivarius promised to him by Madame Petrova. Still believing Holmes's story that he and Watson are both gay, Rogozhin offers roses to Watson. Editor Ernest Walter unsuccessfully argued for this to be the final scene of the film, as a nod to the finale of Some Like It Hot, but Billy Wilder refused, preferring to end the film on a more mournful note. (This scene does not survive.)

=== Lost Loch Ness prop ===
A 30 ft (9m) model of the Loch Ness Monster was built for the film in 1969. The model included a neck and two humps and was taken alongside a pier for filming of portions of the film. Billy Wilder did not want the humps and asked that they be removed, despite warnings that it would affect its buoyancy. As a result, the model sank. The model was rediscovered in April 2016 during a Scottish expedition to find the Loch Ness Monster.

=== Subtext ===
Director Billy Wilder has said he originally intended to portray Holmes explicitly as a repressed homosexual, stating, "I should have been more daring. I have this theory. I wanted to have Holmes homosexual and not admitting it to anyone, including maybe even himself. The burden of keeping it secret was the reason he took dope." Holmes' personal interests and particularly his feelings for Watson remain ambiguous in the film, including but not limited to Holmes' admission that he is "not a whole-hearted admirer of womankind", the enjoyment he derives from implying to outsiders that he and Watson are lovers, and his statement that Watson is "being presumptuous" by assuming there have been women in his life, among others. Mark Gatiss called The Private Life of Sherlock Holmes "the film that changed his life" for this reason: "It's a fantastically melancholy film. The relationship between Sherlock and Watson is treated beautifully; Sherlock effectively falls in love with him in the film, but it's so desperately unspoken."

== Reception ==
Upon its release at Radio City Music Hall in New York City, it received excellent reviews. Vincent Canby called it a "comparatively mild Billy Wilder and rather daring Sherlock Holmes, not a perfect mix, perhaps, but a fond and entertaining one". It grossed $150,000 in its opening week at the Music Hall, ranking 13th at the US box office. Kim Newman, reviewing it in Empire magazine, described it as the "best Sherlock Holmes movie ever made" and "sorely underrated in the Wilder canon". Roger Ebert was more critical, giving the film two-and-a-half stars out of four. He wrote that it is "disappointingly lacking in bite and sophistication", that it "begins promisingly enough" but that "before the movie is 20 minutes old, Wilder has settled for simply telling a Sherlock Holmes adventure". Gene Siskel gave the film one-and-a-half stars out of four and called it "a conventional and not very well written mystery" that made it seem as though "Wilder had enough of an idea for a television variety show skit but unfortunately saw fit to expand it into a movie". Charles Champlin of the Los Angeles Times wrote that "the whole effect of the picture is a kind of affable blandness which, given the expectations you have of Billy Wilder, constitutes a disappointment". Based on the sample cities covered by Variety, it grossed $536,927 from 39 play weeks in 1970.

Peter Bradshaw of The Guardian, reviewing the film in 2002, wrote: "Billy Wilder's distinctive, irreverent slant on the world's greatest 'consulting detective' holds up reasonably well 32 years on; you wouldn't expect anything directed by Wilder and scripted by his long-time associate I. A. L. Diamond to be anything less than funny and watchable, and this is both".

On the review aggregator website Rotten Tomatoes, 87% of 30 critics' reviews are positive.

== Influences and adaptations ==
Steven Moffat and Mark Gatiss, the creators and writers of the BAFTA and Emmy Award-winning series Sherlock, credited The Private Life of Sherlock Holmes as a source of inspiration for their show.

Michael Hardwick and Mollie Hardwick authored a novelization of the film.

== Home media ==
In 1994, Image Entertainment released the film on LaserDisc, in what was called Private Life of Sherlock Holmes, The: Special Edition. The release includes "The Dreadful Business of the Naked Honeymooners." The sequence was subtitled because no audio was available.

The Region 1 DVD release restored portions of cut scenes that consists of soundtracks and a series of stills. A Blu-ray was released 22 July 2014 by Kino Lorber. It includes deleted scenes and bonus material.
