= Larry Tucker (screenwriter) =

American screenwriter and producer

- Born: June 23, 1934; Philadelphia, Pennsylvania, U.S.
- Died: April 1, 2001 (aged 66); Los Angeles, California, U.S.

Larry Tucker (June 23, 1934 – April 1, 2001) was an American film and television writer, producer, and occasional actor. He wrote the comedy Bob & Carol & Ted & Alice (1969) with Paul Mazursky, for which they were nominated for the Academy Award for Best Original Screenplay.

== Biography ==
Tucker was from Philadelphia and began his career with humourist Mort Sahl at San Francisco's Hungry i club. After The Hungry I, Tucker became a television writer, working on The Danny Kaye Show. Tucker acted in the films Blast of Silence (1961), Advise and Consent (1962), Shock Corridor (1963) and Angels Hard as They Come (1971).

Tucker and Mazursky were also responsible for the development and production of The Monkees eponymous television series and the 1968 romantic comedy I Love You, Alice B. Toklas!, which starred Peter Sellers. In the early 1980s Tucker was executive producer and one of the writers of the sitcom Jennifer Slept Here (1983), Mr. Merlin (1981–82), Teachers Only (1982–83) and Stir Crazy (1985).

Tucker died of complications from multiple sclerosis and cancer in 2001.

== Filmography ==
=== Actor ===
| Year | Title | Role | Notes |
|---|---|---|---|
| 1961 | Blast of Silence | Big Ralph | |
| 1962 | Advise and Consent | Manuel | |
| 1963 | Shock Corridor | Pagliacci | |
| 1968 | I Love You, Alice B. Toklas | Hitch-hiker | Uncredited |
| 1969 | Bob & Carol & Ted & Alice | Bearded Man Walking in Front of Hotel | Uncredited |
| 1971 | Angels Hard as They Come | Lucifer | (final film role) |

== Television ==
| Year | Title | Role | Notes |
|---|---|---|---|
| 1966 | The Monkees | Dr. Turner | S1:E10, "The Monkees" |
