= Cactus Flower (film) =

1969 film by Gene Saks

- Theatrical release poster by Robert McGinnis
- Directed by: Gene Saks
- Screenplay by: I. A. L. Diamond
- Based on: Cactus Flower by Abe Burrows
- Produced by: M. J. Frankovich
- Starring: Walter Matthau; Ingrid Bergman; Goldie Hawn
- Cinematography: Charles Lang
- Edited by: Maury Winetrobe
- Music by: Quincy Jones
- Production company: Frankovich Productions
- Distributed by: Columbia Pictures
- Release date: December 16, 1969 (United States)
- Running time: 103 minutes
- Country: United States
- Language: English
- Budget: $3 million
- Box office: $25.8 million

Cactus Flower is a 1969 American screwball comedy film directed by Gene Saks, and starring Walter Matthau, Ingrid Bergman and Goldie Hawn, who won an Academy Award for her performance.

The screenplay was adapted by I. A. L. Diamond from the 1965 Broadway play of the same title written by Abe Burrows, which, in turn, is based on the French play Fleur de cactus by Pierre Barillet and Jean-Pierre Gredy. Cactus Flower was the tenth highest-grossing film of 1969.

== Plot ==
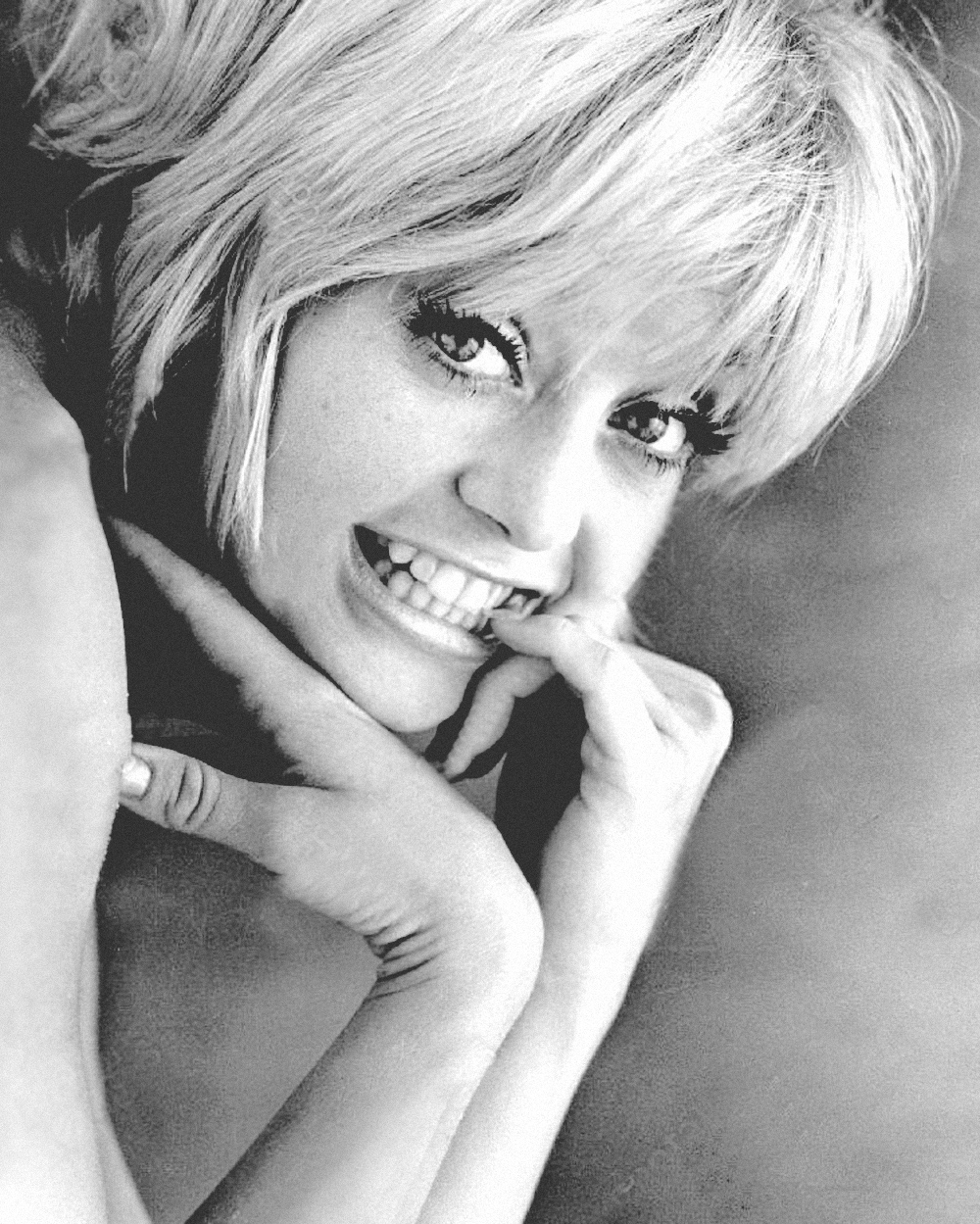
Publicity photo of Goldie Hawn in Cactus Flower

Twentyish Toni Simmons attempts suicide by gas from her stove, but her neighbor, Igor Sullivan, smells the gas and rescues her by using mouth-to-mouth resuscitation, which changes into kissing after Toni regains consciousness. Toni and Igor develop a friendship, with Igor patiently listening to Toni's romantic disappointments while pointing out reality.

Toni's suicide attempt came after being stood up by her lover, middle-aged Manhattan dentist Julian Winston. Wishing to avoid entanglement, Julian had told Toni, untruthfully, that he had a wife and three children. After learning that Toni had been willing to die over him, Julian tells her that he wants to marry her, saying that his wife is eager to divorce him. Concerned over his wife's well-being, however, Toni insists on meeting her to ensure she has agreed to the divorce. Julian asks Stephanie Dickinson, his nurse, to pose as his wife. Stephanie initially refuses but relents because she has long been in love with her employer.

While on an outing with her two nephews, Stephanie stops by the record store where Toni works to tell Toni that she is Julian's wife and agrees to the divorce. Mistaking Stephanie's nephews for Julian's children, and sensing Stephanie's feelings for Julian, Toni is guilt-ridden, expressing qualms to Julian about breaking up their home. Again, Julian lies, telling Toni his wife wants to leave him for her boyfriend. Toni immediately insists on meeting him, and Julian enlists his friend, Harvey, to pose as Stephanie's boyfriend, promising free dental work for Harvey's girlfriend. Julian stages a "coincidental" encounter with Stephanie and Harvey at a club; however, Harvey's real girlfriend turns up, complicating matters, making Toni believe that Stephanie is in the hands of a womanizer. Toni insists that Julian escort his wife home. Hoping to alleviate Toni's qualms, Julian sends Toni an expensive (but irregular) mink stole, which Toni derides to Igor as outdated; following an impulse, Toni sends the mink to Stephanie with Julian's original note (that does not refer to Toni by name) still attached, which lifts Stephanie's spirits.

Embracing newfound confidence, Stephanie accepts the overtures of Julian's patient, Señor Arturo Sánchez, a Latin diplomat in the United Nations. After attending a ball with him in a new evening gown and the mink stole, she invites Sánchez to the club from the previous night, where Toni, Julian, and Igor have also returned. Stephanie and Igor quickly hit it off, to the dismay and jealousy of Julian and Toni. Finding his car being towed, Julian runs off to the garage to retrieve it, leaving Toni stranded.

Stephanie arrives at work the next morning, giddy, still wearing her gown from the night before. She happily shares a few vague details with Julian about her night spent on the beach with Igor. Symbolically, Stephanie notices that the cactus on her desk has bloomed. Stephanie and Julian get into an argument about the propriety of Stephanie's relationship with a younger Igor and Julian's dishonesty with a much younger Toni, and Stephanie quits. Stephanie visits Toni's apartment to confess to her that she is really Julian's nurse and that he has never been married.

After Stephanie leaves, Julian arrives and tells Toni that his wife now refuses to divorce him, but he and Toni can continue their relationship. Exasperated with his dishonesty, Toni fools Julian into believing that she and Igor have been romantically involved all along; she then realizes that she prefers Igor. Julian storms off to get drunk at a bar that night.

Next morning, Julian encounters Stephanie at the office; she has returned to pick up the cactus from her desk. Julian tells Stephanie that he and Toni have split up; he is relieved that he would not now have to marry Toni and that he could go home to his "wife". Overjoyed, Stephanie embraces him, as Julian confesses that he has fallen in love with her and they kiss.

== Cast ==
- Walter Matthau as Julian Winston, a dentist
- Ingrid Bergman as Stephanie Dickinson, Winston's assistant
- Goldie Hawn as Toni Simmons, Winston's girlfriend
- Jack Weston as Harvey Greenfield, Winston's patient and friend
- Rick Lenz as Igor Sullivan, Toni's neighbor, a writer
- Vito Scotti as Señor Arturo Sánchez, a diplomat and patient of Winston
- Irene Hervey as Mrs. Durant, a patient of Winston
- Eve Bruce as Georgia, Harvey Greenfield's date
- Irwin Charone as Toni's employer, a record store manager
- Matthew Saks as Stephanie Dickinson's nephew

== Release ==
The film premiered at two locations in New York City, the Paris Theater and Astor Theatre, on Monday, December 15, 1969.

== Reception ==
The film was a box-office success, becoming the tenth highest-grossing film of 1969.

Howard Thompson of The New York Times stated that "both the expansive scenario of I. A. L. Diamond and the flexible direction of Gene Saks open up and even ventilate the story."

Roger Ebert of the Chicago Sun-Times gave the film 3½ stars out of four, and declared that "the chemistry works" and "the movie is better than the play."

Gene Siskel of the Chicago Tribune gave the film two stars out of four, writing, "This is a film in the old style, but not in the good old style. The lines are neither current nor witty."

Variety wrote that the names of the stars "should pack some boxoffice punch. The film, however, drags, which is probably the [worst] thing that can be said of a light comedy. It's due to sloppy direction by Gene Saks and the miscasting of Matthau opposite Miss Bergman."

Charles Champlin of the Los Angeles Times wrote, "Cactus Flower was a successful Broadway comedy and it translates to the screen quite nicely ... It is a craftily contrived piece of silliness enacted by competent and attractive people: Laugh In's Goldie Hawn, Walter Matthau and Ingrid Bergman in that order of laudability."

In her first major film role, Goldie Hawn, once described by Time as the "dizzy cream puff who is constantly blowing her lines [on Laugh-In]", was praised in that same magazine for being "a natural reactress; her timing is so canny that even her tears run amusingly". Hawn's performance in the film won her the Academy Award for Best Supporting Actress.

On review aggregator Rotten Tomatoes, the film holds an approval rating of 85%, based on 20 reviews, with an average score of 6.9/10. On Metacritic, the film received a score of 67, based on 5 reviews, indicating "generally favorable" reviews.

== Awards and nominations ==
Award	Category	Subject	Result
Academy Awards	Best Supporting Actress	Goldie Hawn	Won
British Academy Film Awards	Best Actress in a Leading Role	Goldie Hawn	Nominated
Golden Globe Awards	Best Motion Picture – Musical or Comedy		Nominated
Golden Globe Awards	Best Actress in a Motion Picture – Musical or Comedy	Ingrid Bergman	Nominated
Golden Globe Awards	Best Supporting Actress – Motion Picture	Goldie Hawn	Won
Writers Guild of America Awards	Best Comedy Adapted from Another Medium	I. A. L. Diamond	Nominated

== Music ==
Cactus Flower

Soundtrack album by Quincy Jones
- Released: 1969
- Recorded: 1969
- Genre: Film score
- Length: 32:35
- Labels: Bell; Bell 1201
- Producer: Quincy Jones

Quincy Jones chronology
Bob & Carol & Ted & Alice (1969)	Cactus Flower (1969)	John and Mary (1970)

The film score was composed, arranged and conducted by Quincy Jones and featured vocalists Sarah Vaughan and Johnny Wesley. The soundtrack album was released on the Bell label in 1969.

The Vinyl Factory stated, "The music Jones supplied for this trippy film is Quincy's nod to psychedelia and sunshine pop – covering the Monkees' (composed by Neil Diamond) 'I'm a Believer', and 'I Wonder What She's Doin' Tonight', which was penned by Boyce and Hart, also of Monkees fame. Sarah Vaughan adds some gravity with 'The Time for Love Is Anytime', and there's even a groovy version of 'To Sir, With Love'. A sweet cocktail." The score also contains a second Monkees cover, "She Hangs Out", written by Jeff Barry, another artist who had worked with the Monkees.

=== Track listing ===
All compositions by Cynthia Weil and Quincy Jones, except where noted:

1. "The Time for Love Is Anytime ("Cactus Flower" Theme)" − 2:48
2. "To Sir with Love" (Mark London, Don Black) − 3:30
3. "I Needs to Be Bee'd With" (Quincy Jones, Ernie Shelby) − 2:35
4. "I'm a Believer" (Neil Diamond) − 3:00
5. "The Time for Love Is Anytime ("Cactus Flower" Theme)" − 3:25
6. "The Time for Love Is Anytime ("Cactus Flower" Theme) [Piano Version]" − 3:25
7. "She Hangs Out (Doin' the Dentist)" (Jeff Barry) − 3:45
8. "The Spell You Spin" (Quincy Jones, Dave Grusin, Bob Russell) − 3:48
9. "I Wonder What She's Doin' Tonight" (Tommy Boyce, Bobby Hart) − 3:00
10. "The Time for Love Is Anytime ("Cactus Flower" Theme) [Organ Version]" − 3:17

=== Personnel ===
- Orchestra arranged and conducted by Quincy Jones including
  - Sarah Vaughan (track 1), Johnny Wesley (track 3) − vocals
  - Jimmie Haskell − arranger (tracks 1, 5, 6 & 10)
  - Bobby Bryant − fluegelhorn
  - Artie Kane, Roger Kellaway − piano
  - Dennis Budimir − guitar
  - Earl Palmer − drums
  - Carol Kaye − electric bass
  - Gene Estes, Emil Richards, Larry Bunker − percussion

== Influence ==
The film has been remade several times. An English language remake, Just Go With It, starring Adam Sandler and Jennifer Aniston, was released in 2011. An Egyptian version titled Nos Sa'a Gawaz (Half-Hour Marriage), starring Rushdy Abaza, Shadia and Adel Imam, was released in 1969. An Indian version starring Salman Khan, Katrina Kaif and Sushmita Sen, titled 'Maine Pyaar Kyu Kiya', was released in 2005.
