= Pierre Barillet =

French playwright (1923–2019)

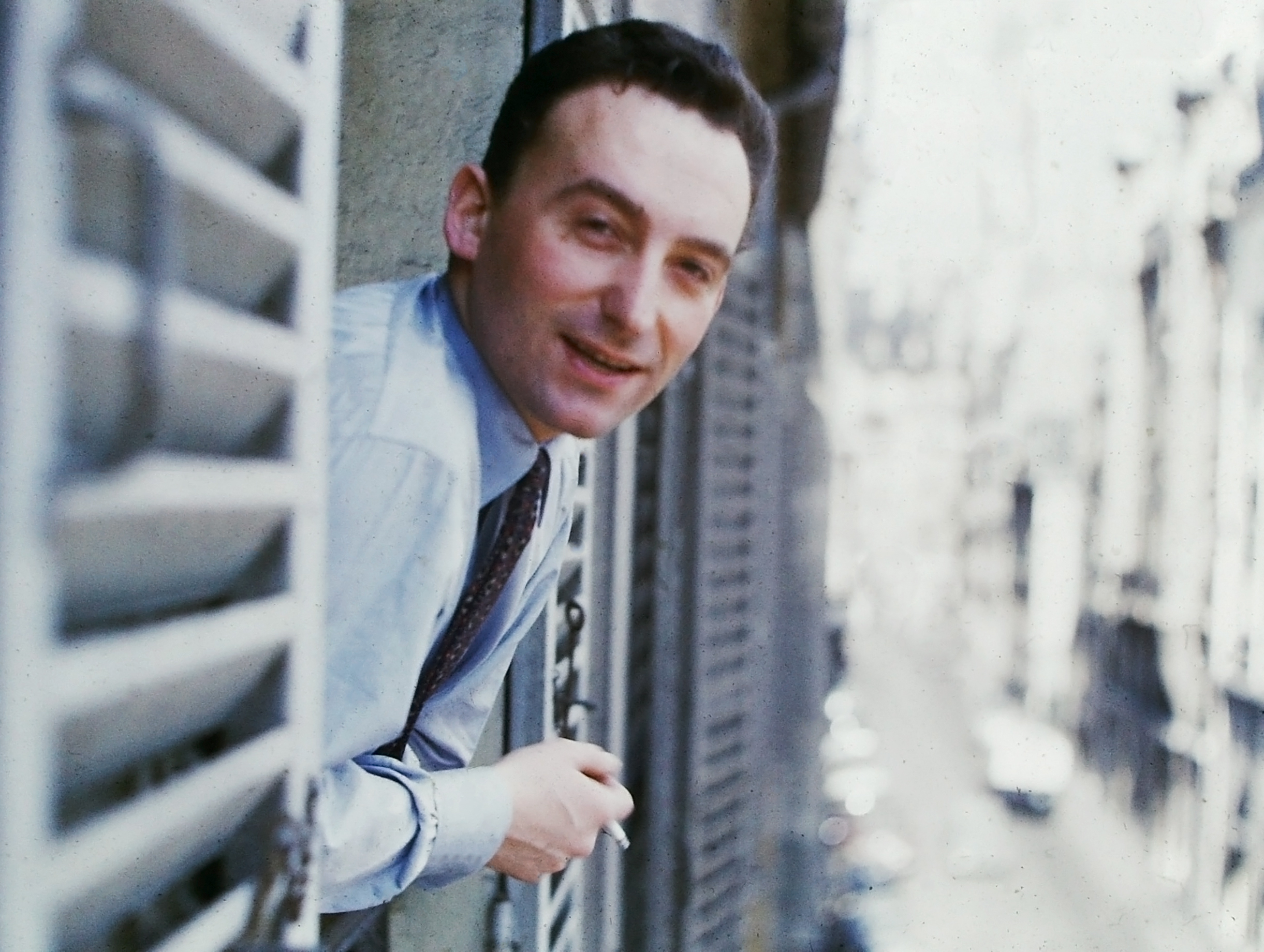
- Born: 24 August 1923; Paris, France
- Died: 8 January 2019 (aged 95); Paris, France
- Occupation: Playwright
- Years active: 1945-2019

Pierre Barillet (24 August 1923 – 8 January 2019) was a French playwright.

== Biography ==
Barillet was born in Paris, France. Passionate about theatre since childhood, he wrote his first play, Les Héritiers, in 1945 after being a law student. It was followed by Les Amants de Noël, performed at the Théâtre de Poche. He also worked as a radio broadcaster, reading novels and plays with Agnès Capri. He first experienced success in 1951 with Le Don d'Adèle, which he wrote along with Jean-Pierre Gredy. The play was performed over a thousand times. Over the next several decades, Barillet would develop what he was most famous for, Boulevard theatre. Certain of his plays were adapted to Broadway, including Fleur de cactus (Cactus Flower, written by Abe Burrows) and Quarante carats (Forty Carats).

In the 1980s, Barillet appeared in television shows, including Malesherbes, avocat du roi, and Condorcet.

In the 1990s Barillet authored biographies, such as La Féline about Simone Simon, and Les Seigneurs du rire, which was about Robert de Flers, Gaston Arman de Caillavet, and Francis de Croisset. Barillet's book Quatre années sans relâche was about theatrical life in France during their German occupation in World War II. À la ville comme à la scène was an autobiography about the years he spent writing and performing in plays.

Barillet was an officer of the Ordre des Arts et des Lettres and a Knight of the Legion of Honor.

== Personal life ==
Barillet was married to comedian Roland Oberlin.

== Film adaptations ==
- Adele's Gift, directed by Émile Couzinet (France, 1951, based on the play Le Don d'Adèle)
- Les femmes sont marrantes, directed by André Hunebelle (France, 1958, based on the play Ami-ami)
- Cactus Flower, directed by Gene Saks (USA, 1969, based on the play Fleur de cactus)
- 40 Carats, directed by Milton Katselas (USA, 1973, based on the play Quarante carats)
- Potiche, directed by François Ozon (France, 2010, based on the play Potiche)
- Just Go with It, directed by Dennis Dugan (USA, 2011, based on the play Fleur de cactus)

== Screenwriter ==
- Beauties of the Night (dir. René Clair, 1952)
