= I. A. L. Diamond =

American screenwriter (1920–1988)

- Born: Ițec Domnici; June 27, 1920; Ungheni, Romania (now Moldova)
- Died: April 21, 1988 (aged 67); Beverly Hills, California, U.S.
- Occupation: Screenwriter
- Years active: 1941–1981
- Spouse: Barbara Ann Bentley (m. 1945)
- Children: 2
- Awards: Academy Award for Best Original Screenplay; 1960 The Apartment; NYFCC Award for Best Screenplay; 1960 The Apartment; WGA Award – Best Written American Comedy; 1960 The Apartment; 1959 Some Like It Hot; 1957 Love in the Afternoon

I. A. L. Diamond (born Ițec (Itzek) Domnici; June 27, 1920 – April 21, 1988) was a Romanian–American screenwriter, best known for his collaborations with Billy Wilder.

== Life and career ==
Diamond was born in Ungheni, Bessarabia, Romania, i.e. present day Moldova. He emigrated with his mother and sister, following his father to the Crown Heights area of Brooklyn in the United States. There, he studied at the Boy's High School, showing ability in mathematics, competing in the state Mathematics Olympiads in 1936–37 and winning several medals therein. Diamond was referred to as "Iz" in Hollywood, and was known to quip that his initials stood for "Interscholastic Algebra League", a prize he also won while attending Boys' High School.

Diamond completed his undergraduate studies at Columbia in 1941. There he studied journalism, publishing in the Columbia Daily Spectator under the pseudonym "I. A. L. Diamond". He was editor of the humor magazine Jester of Columbia and a member of the Philolexian Society. He became the only person to single-handedly write four consecutive productions of the annual revue, the Varsity Show, and a spare should they need one.

After graduating, he abandoned a plan to pursue his master's in engineering at Columbia and accepted a short-term contract in Hollywood. A succession of limited-term contracts ensued, notably at Paramount, where Diamond worked on projects without receiving a writing credit. He moved to Universal Pictures, where he made his first film Murder in the Blue Room. It was a year later at Warner Bros., that he achieved his first real success and consequent recognition with Never Say Goodbye. He worked at 20th Century Fox for four years.

In 1957, he began collaborating with Billy Wilder, working on the film Love in the Afternoon. They later wrote the classic films, Some Like It Hot, The Apartment (which won an Academy Award for Best Original Screenplay), One, Two, Three, Irma la Douce, Kiss Me, Stupid, The Fortune Cookie and The Private Life of Sherlock Holmes.

In 1969, Diamond wrote the screenplay for the film adaptation of the play Cactus Flower. In total, Diamond and Wilder wrote the scripts for twelve films. Some featured characters engaging in an endless but friendly squabbling, such as Joe and Jerry in Some Like It Hot and Holmes and Watson in The Private Life of Sherlock Holmes. Diamond's widow said that these characters were based on her husband's relationship with Wilder.

In 1980, Diamond and Wilder received the Writers Guild of America's Laurel Award for career achievement in screenwriting. Wilder had previously received the Laurel Award in 1957 for his partnership with Charles Brackett.

Diamond died of multiple myeloma on April 21, 1988.

== Filmography ==
=== As writer ===
- Murder in the Blue Room (1944)
- Never Say Goodbye (1946)
- Two Guys from Milwaukee (1946)
- Love and Learn (1947)
- Two Guys from Texas (1948)
- Romance on the High Seas (1948) (additional dialogue)
- Always Together (1948)
- It's a Great Feeling (1949) (story)
- The Girl from Jones Beach (1949)
- Let's Make It Legal (1951)
- Love Nest (1951)
- Something for the Birds (1952)
- Monkey Business (1952)
- That Certain Feeling (1956)
- Love in the Afternoon (1957)
- Merry Andrew (1958)
- Some Like It Hot (1959) (screenplay)
- The Apartment (1960)
- One, Two, Three (1961)
- Irma la Douce (1963)
- Kiss Me, Stupid (1964)
- The Fortune Cookie (1966)
- Cactus Flower (1969)
- The Private Life of Sherlock Holmes (1970)
- Avanti! (1972)
- The Front Page (1974)
- Fedora (1978)
- Buddy Buddy (1981)

=== As associate producer ===
- Some Like It Hot (1959)
- The Apartment (1960)
- One, Two, Three (1961)
- Irma la Douce (1963)
- Kiss Me, Stupid (1964)
- The Fortune Cookie (1966)
- The Private Life of Sherlock Holmes (1970)
- Fedora (1978)

== Award and honors ==
=== Academy Awards ===
Year	Category	Title	Result
1959	Best Adapted Screenplay	Some Like It Hot	Nominated
1960	Best Original Screenplay	The Apartment	Won
1966	Best Original Screenplay	The Fortune Cookie	Nominated

=== Golden Globe Awards ===
Year	Category	Title	Result
1972	Best Screenplay	Avanti!	Nominated

=== WGA Awards ===
- 1957: Love in the Afternoon – American Comedy
- 1959: Some Like It Hot – American Comedy
- 1960: The Apartment – American Comedy
- 1961: One, Two, Three – American Comedy
- 1963: Irma la Douce – American Comedy
- 1966: The Fortune Cookie – American Comedy
- 1969: Cactus Flower – Adapted Screenplay (Comedy)
- 1970: The Private Life of Sherlock Holmes – Original Screenplay (Comedy)
- 1972: Avanti! – Adapted Screenplay (Comedy)
- 1974: The Front Page – Adapted Screenplay (Comedy)
- 1980: Laurel Award for Screenwriting Achievement
