= Cactus Flower (play) =

Farce by Abe Burrows

- Rare Broadway poster including the name of Joseph Campanella, who was replaced by Barry Nelson before opening night.
- Original language: English
- Written by: Abe Burrows. Based on a play by Pierre Barillet and Jean-Pierre Gredy
- Characters: Stephanie; Julian; Igor; Toni
- Genre: Comedy
- Setting: Manhattan

Premiere
- Date: 8 December 1965
- Place: Royale Theatre, New York City

Cactus Flower is a farcical play by Abe Burrows. It played for years on Broadway before being adapted by I.A.L. Diamond into a 1969 feature film directed by Gene Saks.

Based on the play Fleur de cactus by Pierre Barillet and Jean-Pierre Gredy, the comedy focuses on the relationship between young, wild Toni and her older, married lover Julian, a dentist. Convinced the two have no future together, Toni attempts suicide, and a guilt-ridden Julian rashly proposes he leave his wife so the couple can be together. However, Julian has never revealed to Toni that his "marriage" is actually an elaborate lie concocted to keep Toni at arm's length. Toni refuses to break up his household without first meeting and talking with Julian's soon-to-be-ex, so Julian enlists the aid of his shy spinster assistant Stephanie to pose as his non-existent wife. Complications arise when Toni decides the two must find her a new beau so everyone concerned can live happily ever after.

After two previews, the Broadway production, directed by Burrows, opened on December 8, 1965, at the Royale Theatre. There it ran for two years and nine months before transferring to the Longacre, for a total run of 1,234 performances, ending on November 23, 1968. The original cast included Lauren Bacall, Barry Nelson, Brenda Vaccaro, and Burt Brinckerhoff. Lloyd Bridges, Kevin McCarthy, and Betsy Palmer were replacements later in the run. Both Vaccaro and Brinckerhoff were nominated for Tony Awards for their featured performances.

The play was adapted for film several times: first in 1969 as the Egyptian movie Half an Hour of Marriage, (Arabic: نص ساعة جواز"); then, the same year, as Cactus Flower with Walter Matthau, Ingrid Bergman and Goldie Hawn (for which Hawn won the Academy Award for Best Supporting Actress); in 2005 as a Bollywood movie Maine Pyar Kyun Kiya? (Why did I fall in love?) with Salman Khan, Sushmita Sen and Katrina Kaif; and again in 2011, as Just Go With It starring Adam Sandler, Jennifer Aniston and Brooklyn Decker.

== Awards and nominations ==
=== Original Broadway production ===
Year	Award	Category	Nominee	Result
1966	Tony Award	Best Featured Actor in a Play	Burt Brinckerhoff	Nominated
1966	Tony Award	Best Featured Actress in a Play	Brenda Vaccaro	Nominated
