= List of The Defenders (1961) episodes =

This is a list of episodes of the television series The Defenders.

== Series overview ==
Season	Episodes	Originally released	
Season	Episodes	First released	Last released
1	32	September 16, 1961	May 26, 1962
2	34	September 15, 1962	May 25, 1963
3	36	September 28, 1963	June 27, 1964
4	30	September 24, 1964	May 13, 1965

== Episodes ==
=== Season 1 (1961–62) ===
No. overall	No. in season	Title	Directed by	Written by	Original release date
1	1	"The Quality of Mercy"	Buzz Kulik	Reginald Rose	September 16, 1961
A doctor (Philip Abbott) jeopardizes his life and career in order to show mercy toward a newborn with Down syndrome. Also features Jack Klugman as the district attorney and Gene Hackman as the boy's father.
2	2	"Killer Instinct"	Franklin J. Schaffner	John Vlahos	September 23, 1961
A mild-mannered man (William Shatner) is assailed by doubt and guilt after he kills a savage street bully in self-defense. Joanne Linville stars as Shatner's wife.
3	3	"Death Across the Counter"	Buzz Kulik	Reginald Rose	September 30, 1961
A drug addict (Clu Gulager) believes that he has committed murder during an attempted holdup at a grocery store.
4	4	"The Riot"	Buzz Kulik	Max Ehrlich	October 7, 1961
A negotiator is needed between rioting convicts and prison authorities. Stars Fritz Weaver, Frank Sutton and Joseph Sweeney.
5	5	"Young Lovers"	Buzz Kulik	John Vlahos	October 14, 1961
Two secretly married teenagers (Burt Brinckerhoff, Lynn Loring) are forced into a shocking emotional experience owing to the families' differing religions.
6	6	"The Boy Between"	Franklin J. Schaffner	Robert Thom	October 21, 1961
A sensitive young boy (Richard Thomas) is the pawn in a bitter custody battle between estranged parents (Arthur Hill and Norma Crane)
7	7	"The Hundred Lives of Harry Simms"	John Brahm	Alvin Boretz	October 28, 1961
A nightclub entertainer (Frank Gorshin) kills his fiancee after she threatens to leave him, and a psychiatrist (Sam Wanamaker) is brought in to help him.
8	8	"The Accident"	Buzz Kulik	Reginald Rose	November 4, 1961
A child is badly injured in a hit-and-run accident that was caused by a spoiled, wealthy woman (Evans Evans), and then dies when the parents' religious beliefs prevent surgery that could save his life.
9	9	"The Trial of Jenny Scott"	Buzz Kulik	Reginald Rose	November 11, 1961
Lawrence and Kenneth defend a woman (Mary Fickett) who has been accused of killing her husband.
10	10	"The Man With the Concrete Thumb"	Ralph Nelson	Ernest Kinoy	November 18, 1961
Kenneth's girlfriend (Joan Hackett) is accused of assaulting a man with a brick during a protest, a situation that eventually leads to a stubborn and arrogant public works commissioner (Loring Smith) being accused of bribery.
11	11	"The Treadmill"	Don Richardson	Peter Stone	November 25, 1961
A convicted murderer (Edward Binns) who has spent the last 25 years in a mental institution is the subject of a bid for a new trial.
12	12	"Perjury"	Boris Sagal	Adrian Spies	December 2, 1961
Kenneth must defend Lawrence after the latter is accused of trying to force a witness (Robert Loggia) to lie during a murder trial. Also features Robert Duvall.
13	13	"The Attack"	Franklin J. Schaffner	John W. Bloch	December 9, 1961
A policeman (Richard Kiley) is charged with murder after he kills a teenage boy that the man's five-year-old daughter has accused of assaulting her. Also features Nancy Marchand and Martin Sheen.
14	14	"The Prowler"	Paul Bogart	David Shaw	December 16, 1961
A wealthy man (Kent Smith) confesses to murdering the abusive ex-husband of his young wife (Elizabeth Ashley) as a result of the man's continuing blackmail.
15	15	"Gideon's Follies"	Franklin J. Schaffner	Robert J. Crean	December 23, 1961
A much-married millionaire is found stabbed to death, and his many ex-wives (Julie Newmar, Tsai Chin, Eva Gabor, Gloria DeHaven, Shirl Conway and Zohra Lampert) are suspected.
16	16	"The Best Defense"	Paul Stanley	Ernest Kinoy	December 30, 1961
Lawrence and Kenneth reluctantly defend a gangster (Martin Balsam) of murder charges, but his acquittal leads to some startling revelations after the trial ends.
17	17	"The Bedside Murder"	Fielder Cook	Max Ehrlich	January 6, 1962
When an elderly woman dies under mysterious circumstances, her doctor (Sam Jaffe) is accused of poisoning her with a fatal overdose of morphine. That results in an old friend (Alexander Scourby) of Lawrence's asking him to take the case, but during the course of the trial, a shocking discovery is made. Also features Murray Hamilton and Barry Morse.
18	18	"The Search"	John Brahm	Reginald Rose	January 20, 1962
After a man (James Congdon) confesses to a murder that another (Harry Millard) had been tried, convicted, and executed for six years earlier, Lawrence and the district attorney (Jack Klugman) revisit their case.
19	19	"Storm at Birch Glen"	John Brahm	Jerome Ross	January 27, 1962
A supervisor at a boy's reformatory (James Broderick) is tried for causing the death of one of the youths, and must also face the wrath of both the townspeople and reformatory authorities.
20	20	"The Point Shaver"	Buzz Kulik	Mann Rubin	February 3, 1962
A college basketball player (Paul Prokop) is accused of point shaving by conspiring with a gambler to fix a game.
21	21	"The Locked Room"	David Greene	Ernest Kinoy	February 10, 1962
A woman (Inga Swenson) is murdered and the only witnesses (Viveca Lindfors, as the defendant, and Zachary Scott, her husband) are not talking. Three jurors (William Daniels, Dody Goodman, and Marian Winters) speculate on what could have happened.
22	22	"The Empty Chute"	Jack Smight	Max Ehrlich	February 17, 1962
A lonely and isolated army sergeant (Michael Strong) is charged with murder, and asks Lawrence to defend him at the court-martial.
23	23	"The Crusader"	Daniel Petrie	Jerome Ross	February 17, 1962
During a routine visit to a prison, Kenneth is intrigued by the claims of a prisoner's (Warren Stevens) innocence after being rejected for parole, resulting in his attempt to reopen the case.
24	24	"The Hickory Indian"	Stuart Rosenberg	David Karp	March 3, 1962
An elderly man (George Voskovec) steals $6,000 from his son's dress firm in order to pay protection money to racketeers. During his trial for grand larceny, he refuses to name names in order to protect his family. To Lawrence's discomfort, his esteemed college professor (Larry Gates) is prosecuting.
25	25	"The Iron Man"	Buzz Kulik	Albert Sanders	March 10, 1962
A brilliant college student with extremist political views (Ben Piazza) goes on trial after his rally is disrupted by a fellow student, who is nearly beaten to death for protesting his views.
26	26	"The Tarnished Cross"	Franklin J. Schaffner	Reginald Rose	March 17, 1962
A group of teenagers in a boys' clubhouse take it upon themselves to hold a mock trial and try one of their own (Martin Sheen) for murder. Also features Biff McGuire, Ken Kercheval, Barry Primus and Luke Halpin.
27	27	"The Last Six Months"	David Greene	Max Ehrlich	March 31, 1962
After learning he only has six months to live, a businessman (Arthur Hill) commits murder in order to secure an inheritance for his family.
28	28	"The Naked Heiress"	Jack Smight	Alvin Boretz	April 7, 1962
A stripper (Salome Jens) becomes an integral part of the machinations involved in a contested will.
29	29	"Reunion With Death"	Franklin J. Schaffner	David Shaw	April 21, 1962
Five Air Force veterans seek vengeance against one of their former crew members (Lee Philips) for alleged treason during the Korean War, with Lawrence serving as defense counsel. Also features Robert Webber, Michael Conrad and Gene Wilder in a cameo.
30	30	"The Benefactor"	Daniel Petrie	Peter Stone	April 28, 1962
An abortionist (Robert F. Simon) goes on trial and is defended by the Prestons. The episode explores the medical, social, and criminal aspects of abortion.
31	31	"Along Came a Spider"	Elliot Silverstein	Peter Stone	May 5, 1962
An elderly ex-vaudevillian (Paul Hartman) is accused by his nine-year-old granddaughter (Leslye Hunter) of murdering her father. Also features James Earl Jones.
32	32	"The Broken Barrelhead"	David Greene	David Karp	May 26, 1962
After a teenage boy (Richard Jordan) is arrested for vehicular homicide, his wealthy and overbearing father (Harold J. Stone) attempts to ruthlessly buy his own kind of justice. Also features Vincent Gardenia.

=== Season 2 (1962–63) ===
No. overall	No. in season	Title	Directed by	Written by	Original release date
33	1	"The Voices of Death"	Stuart Rosenberg	Reginald Rose	September 15, 1962
A young wife and mother (Ruth Roman) is charged with first-degree murder after she shoots her drunken, abusive husband.
34	2	"Blood Country"	Buzz Kulik	Ernest Kinoy	September 22, 1962
A lynch mob threatens Lawrence and Kenneth's client, who is accused of first-degree murder.
35	3	"The Indelible Silence"	Don Richardson	Charles Garment	September 29, 1962
The Prestons are called on to defend a teenager (Dennis Hopper) with American Nazi sympathies when he is charged with first-degree murder.
36	4	"The Seven Ghosts of Simon Gray"	Paul Bogart	Stanley R. Greenberg	October 6, 1962
An elderly, guilt-ridden man (Ed Begley) broods over a crime of which he has been acquitted.
37	5	"The Unwanted"	Alex March	Robert Thom	October 13, 1962
A judge must decide whether the natural mother (Diana Hyland) of a six-year-old girl should be given custody, or the couple who have raised her.
38	6	"Madman (Part I)"	Stuart Rosenberg	Reginald Rose and Robert Thom	October 20, 1962
The Prestons defend a murderer (Don Gordon) whose insanity is obvious to everyone, except those who must apply the law to his condition.
39	7	"Madman (Part II)"	Stuart Rosenberg	Robert Thom	October 27, 1962
Lawrence and Kenneth must find a way to prove that their client (Don Gordon) is mentally ill and should not be executed.
40	8	"The Bigamist"	Stuart Rosenberg	David Karp	November 3, 1962
A vengeful, and mentally ill, wife tries to take her ex-husband away from his current spouse by having him arrested for bigamy.
41	9	"The Avenger"	Stuart Rosenberg	James Lee	November 17, 1962
A man kills a German scientist who was responsible for the deaths of the man's wife and daughter in the Nazi concentration camp gas chambers and is defended by the Prestons.
42	10	"The Invisible Badge"	John Newland	William Woolfolk	November 24, 1962
A dedicated assistant district attorney who is accused of taking bribe (William Shatner) is defended by the Prestons.
43	11	"The Hidden Jungle"	Denis Sanders	Stanley R. Greenberg	December 1, 1962
Lawrence wins an acquittal for his client on a first-degree murder charge but is then plagued by doubt as to whether his actions were morally right.
44	12	"The Savage Infant"	Don Richardson	David Karp	December 8, 1962
Lawrence and Kenneth become temporary guardians of a juvenile delinquent whose family history suggests he will end up in prison.
45	13	"The Apostle"	Charles S. Dubin	Stanley R. Greenberg	December 15, 1962
A man (Albert Salmi) who bases his life on peace and brotherhood goes on trial after he attacks an abusive drunk who has provoked him.
46	14	"Grandma TNT"	Elliot Silverstein	David Karp	December 22, 1962
A light episode in which a gentle elderly woman (Lillian Gish) is arrested for bank robbery in order to provide for her two sisters, and then escapes from jail.
47	15	"Don't Take the Stand"	Ted Post	David Davidson	December 29, 1962
A man is accused of murdering his friend after a gun goes off during a struggle between the two. The row had been sparked when items from the home of the accused's wealthy girlfriend had been found in the victim's possession.
48	16	"Kill or Be Killed"	Sydney Pollack	Larry Cohen	January 5, 1963
Lawrence defends a man (Gerald O'Loughlin) who commits a crime en route to Sing Sing Prison just as his innocence of the earlier crime is being established.
49	17	"Man Against Himself"	Paul Bogart	Raphael Hayes	January 12, 1963
A young man (Ivan Dixon) tries to defend himself in court after being charged with manslaughter but treats legal advice from the Prestons with contempt.
50	18	"The Poisoned Fruit Doctrine"	Shepard Traube (1907–1983)	A.J. Russell	January 19, 1963
The illegal use of wiretaps becomes the focal point of the trial of a news vendor on trial for allegedly serving as a go-between in a narcotics swindle.
51	19	"Poltergeist"	David Greene	Reginald Rose	January 26, 1963
The Prestons must figure out who is guilty among a group of suspects together on a cold night on Fire Island.
52	20	"Ordeal"	Alex March	David Shaw	February 2, 1963
A married man (Robert Webber) and his mistress (Peggy Maurer) are both wrongly accused of killing his wife.
53	21	"The Hour Before Doomsday"	Stuart Rosenberg	William Woolfolk	February 9, 1963
An egotistical evangelist (John Cullum) files a libel suit against a newspaper man (Kevin McCarthy).
54	22	"The Traitor"	David Greene	Larry Cohen	February 16, 1963
A foreign national (Fritz Weaver) working in the United States is charged with espionage after obtaining classified government documents.
55	23	"The Eye of Fear"	Paul Stewart	Stanley R. Greenberg	February 23, 1963
A man (Robert Loggia) finds his wife dead, and all the evidence points to him as the murderer.
56	24	"Metamorphosis"	David Greene	Stanley R. Greenberg	March 2, 1963
A convicted killer (Robert Duvall) who has been on death row for seven years continues to hold up his pending execution through appeals, while he waits to hear from the clemency board.
57	25	"The Last Illusion"	David Greene	William Woolfolk	March 9, 1963
A magician is drowned while doing his most famous trick, and his wife is then accused of murder.
58	26	"The Heathen"	Stuart Rosenberg	Ernest Kinoy	March 23, 1963
A preacher's remark at his school's board of trustees meeting turns into a battle over freedom of religious beliefs.
59	27	"A Book for Burning"	David Greene	William Woolfolk	March 30, 1963
A small-town politician's grandstanding sparks the arrest of a visiting novelist (Sam Wanamaker) for writing an allegedly obscene book.
60	28	"A Taste of Vengeance"	Don Richardson	A.J. Russell	April 6, 1963
The Prestons defend a woman accused of the mercy killing of her dying husband.
61	29	"The Colossus"	Paul Bogart	Larry Cohen	April 13, 1963
A Nobel-winning scientist (Leo Genn), at work on a cure for leukemia, is charged with the murder of his wife but considers himself above the law.
62	30	"Judgment Eve"	David Greene	Reginald Rose	April 20, 1963
A look at the unpredictable nature of 12 jurors during the course of a first-degree murder trial. Stars Arch Johnson and Charles Durning.
63	31	"The Noose"	Stuart Rosenberg	Larry Cohen	April 27, 1963
The Prestons travel to a small town to defend three men who lynched a man accused of killing a 12-year-old.
64	32	"Everybody Else is Dead"	Paul Bogart	James Lee	May 11, 1963
Lawrence falls in love with a woman (Geraldine Brooks) who is in the process of divorcing her alcoholic husband (Darren McGavin).
65	33	"The Trial of Twenty-Two"	Stuart Rosenberg	Stanley R. Greenberg	May 18, 1963
A corrupt labor leader helps frame a union member for first-degree murder.
66	34	"The Brother Killers"	Don Richardson	David Karp	May 25, 1963
A freshman college student is killed during a fraternity hazing, which results in three upperclassmen being charged with manslaughter.

=== Season 3 (1963–64) ===
No. overall	No. in season	Title	Directed by	Written by	Original release date
67	1	"The Weeping Baboon"	Stuart Rosenberg	Reginald Rose	September 28, 1963
A quiet young man kills his father and older brother, and during his trial, goes berserk in the classroom.
68	2	"The Empty Heart"	Stuart Rosenberg	Stanley R. Greenberg	October 5, 1963
A disillusioned party girl (Lee Grant) is indicted for attempted murder.
69	3	"The Captive"	Charles S. Dubin	Larry Cohen	October 12, 1963
Lawrence and Kenneth become involved with foreign authorities in a case of international intrigue.
70	4	"The Bagman"	Robert Butler	Roger H. Lewis	October 19, 1963
A simple eviction case turns into a complicated tangle involving a bagman for a local political party machine pressuring a judge with a questionable set of ethics.
71	5	"Conspiracy of Silence"	Alex March	Roger H. Lewis	October 26, 1963
The Prestons sue a doctor (Carroll O'Connor) in a malpractice case that results from the death of a patient.
72	6	"The Cruel Hook"	Elliot Silverstein	Andrea Russo	November 2, 1963
A married man (Edward Asner) kills a woman blackmailing him, and then does nothing when an innocent man is charged with the crime.
73	7	"Star-Spangled Ghetto"	Alex March	Reginald Rose	November 9, 1963
Two misguided youths commit an armed robbery in order to get married. Ossie Davis appears as an assistant district attorney.
74	8	"Loophole"	Charles S. Dubin	A.E. Hotchner	November 16, 1963
After a policeman breaks a department rule, he attempts to saddle another officer with the blame.
75	9	"The Seal of Confession"	Alex March	Ian McLellan Hunter	November 30, 1963
A Catholic priest experiences a severe dilemma when a penitent confesses to both adultery and murder.
76	10	"Climate of Evil"	Paul Stanley	David Karp	December 7, 1963
An innocent bank clerk is convicted of embezzlement and imprisoned, then is turned into a killer by a vicious prison guard and a fellow convict.
77	11	"The Crowd Pleaser"	Don Richardson	Charles Garment	December 14, 1963
A punch-drunk boxer is tried for manslaughter after he kills a man in the ring who had been paying attention to the boxer's estranged wife.
78	12	"Old Lady Ironsides"	Paul Bogart	Robert Van Scoyk	December 21, 1963
A tough suffragette (Aline MacMahon) enlists the aid of the Prestons in her fight to permit a pregnant high school girl (Janet Margolin)to graduate.
79	13	"Fugue for Trumpet and Small Boy"	James Sheldon	David W. Rintels	December 28, 1963
A youngster borrows a library manuscript and is then arrested by police for grand larceny.
80	14	"Claire Cheval Died in Boston"	Paul Bogart	Ernest Kinoy	January 4, 1964
A lighter episode about the tribulations of a stage show before it reaches Broadway, and the temperamental leading lady that heads the cast.
81	15	"The Last Day"	Charles S. Dubin	Allan Chase	January 11, 1964
Over a 12-hour span, the Prestons furiously attempt to save the life of their client, a convicted killer set to be executed.
82	16	"Blacklist"	Stuart Rosenberg	Ernest Kinoy	January 18, 1964
A blacklisted character actor (Jack Klugman) hires the Prestons to protect him from losing an acting offer.
83	17	"Who'll Dig His Grave?"	Charles S. Dubin	William Woolfolk	January 25, 1964
A derelict Greenwich Village poet (Barry Morse) takes the blame for a murder he did not commit in a twisted attempt to give his life meaning.
84	18	"All the Silent Voices"	Gerald Mayer	William Woolfolk	February 1, 1964
A woman doctor (Eileen Heckart) is arrested after disseminating birth control data.
85	19	"The Secret"	Paul Bogart	Larry Cohen	February 8, 1964
A scientist discovers a new bomb, but when he withholds the information, he is suspected of spying.
86	20	"The Pill Man"	Leonard Horn	Albert Ruben and Charles Eckert	February 15, 1964
The husband of a drug addict (Teresa Wright) is arrested for selling narcotics without a prescription.
87	21	"Drink Like a Lady"	Stuart Rosenberg	Ellen M. Violett	February 29, 1964
During the course of a weekend drinking binge, an alcoholic (Janice Rule) kills a man during a blackout.
88	22	"Survival"	Tom Gries	William Woolfolk	March 14, 1964
A Marine drill instructor (Leslie Nielsen), who was also a war hero, is court-martialed for causing the death of a recruit.
89	23	"Moment of Truth"	Paul Bogart	David Karp	March 21, 1964
Kenneth is accused of offering a juror (Jack Gilford) $5,000 to fix a case and is brought up on bribery charges, forcing Lawrence to defend him.
90	24	"The Hidden Fury"	Alexander Mackendrick	George Baxt	March 28, 1964
A mental patient (Susan Oliver) kills the fiancee of her psychiatrist.
91	25	"Die Laughing"	Stuart Rosenberg	Roger H. Lewis	April 11, 1964
After a comedian (Milton Berle) is told that he has cancer, he takes an overdose of barbiturates in a suicide attempt.
92	26	"May Day! May Day!"	Stuart Rosenberg	Larry Cohen	April 18, 1964
A wartime hero becomes fanatical about the United States foreign policy toward China, leading him to plot a military takeover of the government.
93	27	"The Thief"	David Greene	Robert J. Crean	April 25, 1964
A female kleptomaniac (Glynis Johns) who is arrested for shoplifting for the fourth time faces life imprisonment.
94	28	"Yankee Go Home"	Paul Bogart	Albert Ruben	May 2, 1964
An American reporter (Richard Kiley) is denied a passport because of an unauthorized trip he made behind the Iron Curtain.
95	29	"The Man Who Saved His Country"	Elliot Silverstein	Albert Ruben	May 9, 1964
A nondescript murder is turned into a cause celebre when the man (James Coburn) falsely pleads guilty to killing a Castro lieutenant in order to become a hero and martyr.
96	30	"Mind Over Murder"	Leonard Horn	Roger H. Lewis	May 16, 1964
A man with extrasensory perception kills a man and then pleads self-defense because of a premonition that he was in danger.
97	31	"The Sixth Alarm"	Lamont Johnson	William Woolfolk	May 23, 1964
A man (Herschel Bernardi) is falsely blamed for burning his factory down, while the actual arsonist is still at large.
98	32	"The Fine Line"	Buzz Kulik	Harold Gast	May 30, 1964
The Prestons defend an ambulance-chasing attorney, whose lack of ethics is based on the love of money and enriching his family.
99	33	"The Non-Violent"	Paul Bogart	Ernest Kinoy	June 6, 1964
A sit-in during a civil rights demonstration becomes an issue dealing with the abridgment of free speech. Includes James Earl Jones, Sam Groom and Ivan Dixon.
100	34	"Stowaway"	Vincent J. Donehue	Edward DeBlasio	June 13, 1964
A young Italian boy enters the United States illegally and then becomes the subject of deportation proceedings.
101	35	"Hollow Triumph"	Paul Sylbert	Howard Fast	June 20, 1964
A woman (Brenda Vaccaro) murders the cousin (and employee) of a stockbroker and then frames him for the crime.
102	36	"The Uncivil War"	David Greene	Roger H. Lewis	June 27, 1964
An adulterous affair sets the stage for a divorce as the jilted wife takes her estranged husband to court.

=== Season 4 (1964–65) ===
No. overall	No. in season	Title	Directed by	Written by	Original release date
103	1	"The Seven Hundred-Year-Old Gang (Part I)"	Paul Bogart	David Karp	September 24, 1964
A retired manufacturer (Jack Gilford) gets into trouble for making wine, is charged with bootlegging, and is defended by the Prestons.
104	2	"The Seven Hundred-Year-Old Gang (Part II)"	Paul Bogart	David Karp	October 1, 1964
During the course of his bootlegging trial, an elderly man admits to committing the crime in an attempt to feel useful.
105	3	"Hero of the People"	Philip Leacock	William Woolfolk and Rod Sylvester	October 8, 1964
A lonely factory worker (Edward Asner) claims to have killed a drug dealer in order to gain celebrity.
106	4	"Go-Between"	Paul Sylbert	Larry Cohen	October 15, 1964
An idealistic presidential candidate (Arthur Hill) becomes much more cynical in the wake of his son's kidnapping, due to the sensation-seeking public that looks to exploit his grief.
107	5	"Conflict of Interests"	Philip Leacock	Ellen M. Violett	October 22, 1964
An arrogant British theater critic (Edward Woodward) is sued for slander by a playwright, but the critic's female lawyer (Cloris Leachman) uses her feminine wiles to win the case.
108	6	"The Man Who..."	Stuart Rosenberg	Ernest Kinoy	October 29, 1964
Lawrence is pressured into running for Congress, but soon finds himself enmeshed in controversy when he is accused of making anti-semitic remarks.
109	7	"Turning Point"	Paul Bogart	James Lee	November 5, 1964
Haunted by the fact that an innocent man has gone to the electric chair, Kenneth seeks to find the real killer.
110	8	"A Taste of Ashes"	David Greene	David W. Rintels	November 12, 1964
Two seamen (Darren McGavin and Martin Sheen) are accused of cannibalism after shipwreck results in a long siege at sea and the death of a fellow shipmate.
111	9	"Comeback"	Stuart Rosenberg	Edward DeBlasio	November 26, 1964
A once-great actress (Viveca Lindfors) is making a comeback after a 15-year absence, but after the first day of work, her car hits a teenager and she is charged with drunk driving.
112	10	"The Siege"	Stuart Rosenberg	Story by : Bo Goldman; Teleplay by : Ian McLellan Hunter	December 3, 1964
Lawrence's office is taken over by an escaped convict (Robert Redford) who is embittered over what he considered to be a substandard defense by the Prestons.
113	11	"Whitewash"	Daniel Petrie	Roger H. Lewis	December 10, 1964
A cynical Puerto Rican politician (Ricardo Montalbán) claims he is being framed when he is accused of extorting money from a contractor.
114	12	"A Voice Loud and Clear"	Paul Bogart	Robert J. Crean	December 17, 1964
A female evangelist (Shirley Knight) kills her former husband but claims that voices that she heard urged her to do it.
115	13	"King of the Hill"	Paul Bogart	Robert J. Crean	December 31, 1964
A one-time gangster (Albert Dekker) claims government persecution when he is charged with smuggling heroin into the country.
116	14	"Whipping Boy"	William Ball	Edward DeBlasio	January 7, 1965
A divorced young mother (Madlyn Rhue) brings her unconscious child to the emergency room, claiming he fell down the steps. When the child dies, she is charged with murder.
117	15	"Eyewitness"	Sam Wanamaker	David Karp	January 14, 1965
A group of juvenile delinquents murders an elderly man on the street, while nearby witnesses do nothing to stop the attack.
118	16	"The Silent Killers"	Daniel Petrie	Story by : Martin Donaldson; Teleplay by : William Woolfolk	January 21, 1965
A man (Dane Clark) goes on trial for the murder of his vengeful wife (Norma Crane) who is still alive but is in hiding. The woman disappeared on a boat while her husband was scuba diving.
119	17	"Death on Wheels"	Paul Bogart	George Bellak	January 28, 1965
A harassed executive (Leslie Nielsen) kills a pedestrian with his car, immediately after an argument with his wife. The Prestons defend him by offering a claim of temporary insanity, based on his psychological state at the time.
120	18	"The Unwritten Law"	Robert Stevens	Larry Cohen	February 4, 1965
A self-righteous man is arrested for killing his wife's lover, but claims he can't be charged based on his belief in an eighteenth-century code.
121	19	"The Objector"	Leonard Horn	Harold Gast	February 11, 1965
A young man (Brandon deWilde) is drafted into the armed services but declares himself a conscientious objector.
122	20	"Fires of the Mind"	David Greene	Arnold Manoff	February 18, 1965
A former doctor (Donald Pleasence) is accused of manslaughter due to the connection with advocacy of the hallucinatory drug LSD
123	21	"No-Knock"	Daniel Petrie	Peter A. Chilles	February 25, 1965
The murder of a policeman leads to a study of the legalities of the "no-knock" search warrant.
124	22	"The Merry-Go-Round Murder"	Paul Bogart	Robert J. Crean	March 4, 1965
A dedicated, over-imaginative governess (Ruth White) tries to play God to a frightened child of irresponsible parents fighting for custody, by creating a dream world for him. She is arrested for kidnapping and child neglect.
125	23	"Nobody Asks What Side You're On"	David Pressman	Ellen M. Violett	March 11, 1965
A female news reporter (Lee Grant) is represented by the Prestons after she claims she killed a man she thought was about to attack her.
126	24	"Impeachment"	Paul Bogart	Stanley R. Greenberg	March 18, 1965
A governor, a former matinee idol, faces impeachment after members of his party become disappointed in his reform efforts.
127	25	"The Sworn Twelve"	Michael Powell	Edward DeBlasio	March 25, 1965
A group of jurors (three of them played by Murray Hamilton, Ruby Dee and Brenda Vaccaro) review their deliberation for Lawrence after he receives a letter from one of them claiming that strange methods were used to obtain a guilty verdict.
128	26	"A Matter of Law and Disorder"	Robert Butler	Roger H. Lewis	April 8, 1965
A man is held for manslaughter in the shooting of an unarmed boy, but the accused claims he killed in self-defense.
129	27	"Youths and Maidens on an Evening Walk"	William Ball	Robert J. Crean	April 15, 1965
A loud and bizarrely-attired woman (Joan Darling) who wants to be an actress is the subject of an attempted makeover by Lawrence.
130	28	"The Prosecutor"	Paul Bogart	David Shaw	April 29, 1965
An assistant district attorney (Larry Blyden) who is considering a partnership in the Preston law firm faces a conflict of interest charge when he is faced with prosecuting one of their clients for murder. Teresa Wright guest stars.
131	29	"The Bum's Rush"	Sidney Katz	Alvin Boretz	May 6, 1965
A Bowery derelict (Tom Bosley) is accused of the murder of another homeless man, and Lawrence is urged by a New York civic group to defend him.
132	30	"Only a Child"	Robert Stevens	Ellen M. Violett	May 13, 1965
After the son of a young couple (Robert Duvall and Collin Wilcox) is killed in an auto accident, the parents' efforts to collect damages results in interactions with an impersonal lawyer that leads to unfortunate results.
