= 25th Writers Guild of America Awards =

- Date: March 16, 1973
- Organized by: Writers Guild of America, East and the Writers Guild of America, West

The 25th Writers Guild of America Awards honored the best film writers and television writers of 1972. Winners were announced at the Beverly Hilton Hotel, Los Angeles, California on March 16, 1973.

== Winners and nominees ==
=== Film ===
Winners are listed first highlighted in boldface.

**Best Drama Written Directly for the Screen**: **The Candidate, Written by Jeremy Larner**; Bad Company, Written by David Newman and Robert Benton; Images, Written by Robert Altman; The Culpepper Cattle Co., Written by Eric Bercovici and Gregory Prentiss; The Great Northfield Minnesota Raid, Written by Philip Kaufman	**Best Comedy Written Directly for the Screen**: **What's Up, Doc?, Written by Buck Henry, David Newman and Robert Benton**; Get to Know Your Rabbit, Written by Jordan Crittenden; Hammersmith Is Out, Written by Stanford Whitmore; Minnie and Moskowitz, Written by John Cassavetes; The War Between Men and Women, Written by Melville Shavelson and Danny Arnold
**Best Drama Adapted from Another Medium**: **The Godfather, Screenplay by Mario Puzo and Francis Ford Coppola; Based on the novel by Mario Puzo**; Deliverance, Screenplay by James Dickey; Based on his novel; Pete 'n' Tillie, Screenplay by Julius J. Epstein; Based on the novel by Peter De Vries; Slaughterhouse-Five, Screenplay by Stephen Geller; Based on the novel by Kurt Vonnegut Jr.; Sounder, Screenplay by Lonne Elder III; Based on the novel by William H. Armstrong	**Best Comedy Adapted from Another Medium**: **Cabaret, Screenplay by Jay Presson Allen; Based on the play by John Van Druten and the book by Joe Masteroff**; Avanti!, Screenplay by Billy Wilder and I.A.L. Diamond; Based on the play by Samuel A. Taylor; Butterflies Are Free, Screenplay by Leonard Gershe; Based on his play; The Heartbreak Kid, Screenplay by Neil Simon; Based on the story "A Change of Plan" by Bruce Jay Friedman; Travels with My Aunt, Screenplay by Jay Presson Allen and Hugh Wheeler; Based on the novel by Graham Greene

=== Television ===
**Episodic Comedy**: **"Chief Surgeon Who?" – M*A*S*H (CBS) – Larry Gelbart**; "Edith's Proble" – All in the Family (CBS) – Burt Styler and Steve Zacharias; "Flashback" – Maude (CBS) – Alan J. Levitt; "The Good-Time News" – The Mary Tyler Moore Show (CBS) – Allan Burns and James L. Brooks; "The Pen Is Mightier Than the Pencil" – The Odd Couple (ABC) – Jack Winter	**Episodic Drama**: **"King of the Mountain" – Kung Fu (ABC) – Herman Miller**; "Etude in Black" – Columbo (NBC) – Steven Bochco, William Link and Richard Levinson; "Please Don't Send Flowers" – Marcus Welby, M.D. (ABC) – Bess Boyle; "The New Mexican Connection" – McCloud (NBC) – Glen A. Larson; "The Barefoot Stewardess Caper" – McCloud (NBC) – Glen A. Larson and Michael Gleason; "Taps, Play It Louder" – Mod Squad (ABC) – Sandor Stern
**Daytime Serials**: **Love of Life (CBS) – Loring Mandel, Nancy Ford and Max McClellan**; The Secret Storm (CBS) – Gabrielle Upton and Joel A. Fifield; Where the Heart Is (CBS) – Claire Labine, Paul Avila Mayer and Charles Dizenzo	

=== Special awards ===
Laurel Award for Screenwriting Achievement

**William Rose**

Valentine Davies Award

**William Ludwig**

Morgan Cox Award

**David P. Harmon**
