= 40 Carats (film) =

1973 film by Milton Katselas, M. J. Frankovich

Forty Carats
- Theatrical release poster
- Directed by: Milton Katselas
- Screenplay by: Leonard Gershe
- Based on: Quarante carats by; Pierre Barillet; Jean-Pierre Gredy; Forty Carats by Jay Presson Allen
- Produced by: M. J. Frankovich
- Starring: Liv Ullmann; Edward Albert; Gene Kelly; Binnie Barnes
- Cinematography: Charles Lang
- Edited by: David E. Blewitt
- Music by: Michel Legrand
- Production company: Frankovich Productions
- Distributed by: Columbia Pictures
- Release date: June 28, 1973
- Running time: 110 minutes
- Country: United States
- Language: English
- Box office: $2,100,000 (US/Canada rentals)

40 Carats is a 1973 American romantic comedy film directed by Milton Katselas. It is based on the 1968 play of the same name by Jay Presson Allen. The screenplay was written by Leonard Gershe (who significantly changed the ending).

The film stars Liv Ullmann, Edward Albert, Gene Kelly, Binnie Barnes (in her final film role), Deborah Raffin, Nancy Walker, and Natalie Schafer. Ullmann was nominated for a Golden Globe Award for Best Motion Picture Actress, Musical or Comedy at the 31st Golden Globe Awards, and the Writers Guild of America nominated Gershe's screenplay for Best Comedy Adapted from Another Medium at the 26th Writers Guild of America Awards.

== Plot ==
On vacation in Greece, Ann Stanley is stranded on the coast when her rented car breaks down. A handsome young man on a motorbike, Peter Latham, offers Ann a ride, which she refuses, reluctant to get on a bike at 36 or accept a ride from a stranger. Peter points out that she is overly cautious, lacking spontaneity or a sense of adventure. Fifty miles from Argos, she may have a long wait. He points out the beauty of the spot, near ancient Greek ruins. Peter proceeds to go down to sea level to swim, pitching a tent within sight of Ann waiting. Eventually Ann joins him in the surf, introducing herself as “Penelope Potter.” They swim, fish, discuss life (Peter is 22), drink ouzo, become increasingly attracted, and ultimately have sex. Peter presents her with a ring he found in the sea. Ann accepts the ring as a token of a serendipitous encounter. The next morning, she flags down a ride on a boat with fishermen, and leaves Peter, still asleep, with a farewell kiss.

In New York, Ann, a realtor, is showing expensive apartments to a client, JD Rogers. A big commission is at stake, so she accepts his invitation to dinner. As Ann dresses for her date, her 17-year-old daughter, Trina, is awaits a ride to a party. Trina is being picked up by her date Arthur Forbes’ friend—Peter. Trina's pushy grandmother, Maud Erickson, is thrilled Peter is a member of an ultrarich socialite family. At 22, Peter works as director of labor relations, while his father remains aloof from the company business. When Ann appears, she is shocked to see Peter, who is delighted to encounter “Penelope Potter” again. He compliments the ring she is wearing, without revealing its origins. JD arrives to pick Ann up for dinner. At the party, Peter pumps Trina for information on Ann. Mistaking his interest in her family, Tina informs him that she prefers older men. Peter learns that Ann remains on friendly terms with Trina's father, Billy Boylan, whom she divorced because of his irresponsibility, and who frequently relies on his ex-wife for loans.

To ingratiate himself with Ann, Peter goes to her business to find an apartment. JD appears and takes Ann, Trina, Peter, and Billy to dinner; all enjoy a cordial evening. Over the next few weeks, Peter refuses to take no for an answer, convincing Ann to date to determine their compatibility. While the age difference embarrasses Ann, Peter is confident they are a good match. Ann's revelation that she is 40, not 36, does not faze him. Meanwhile, JD, who is 43, confesses to Ann that he has been dating Trina and wishes to marry her. Because of the age difference, Ann hesitates to give approval. By contrast, Ann begins to see that Peter, at 22, is more mature than either JD or Billy in their forties.

Peter asks Ann to marry him, but she vacillates. Ann's associates are less accepting of her and Peter than of Trina's and JD's relationship. Peter persists, and eventually Ann agrees to leave the next evening to be married in Greece. Before flying off, Peter arranges to have her meet his parents. Peter's father calls to ask Ann for drinks before their dinner date. Ann assumes Peter will be there. Undermining Ann's confidence—against his wife's wishes—Mr. Latham suggests that Peter eventually will tire of an older wife and seek women his own age. When Peter arrives at the originally appointed time, his father's deception becomes clear when Ann expresses doubts about their hasty marriage plans. Peter admonishes his father for his own rocky marriage. Peter tells Ann that she must commit to their union without allowing herself to be influenced by others. With or without her, he will be on the flight to Greece that evening. Ann goes home to think things over.

Ironically, Billy convinces her that Ann is happier with Peter than she has been in a long time. Ann takes the next flight to Greece. In Greece, Ann meets Peter at the site where they first met. She hops on the back of his motorcycle, and they ride off together to be married.

== Cast ==
- Liv Ullmann as Ann Stanley
- Edward Albert as Peter Latham
- Gene Kelly as Billy Boylan
- Binnie Barnes as Maud Ericson
- Deborah Raffin as Trina Stanley
- Billy Green Bush as J.D. Rogers
- Nancy Walker as Mrs. Margolin
- Don Porter as Mr. Latham
- Rosemary Murphy as Mrs. Latham
- Natalie Schafer as Mrs. Adams
- Claudia Jennings as Gabriella
- Sam Chew Jr. as Arthur Forbes

== Production ==
Audrey Hepburn, Elizabeth Taylor, Joanne Woodward, Doris Day, Glenda Jackson, Shirley MacLaine, and Sophia Loren were all considered for the role of Ann Stanley before the original director (William Wyler) bowed out of the production.

On the Broadway stage in 1968, the role was originated by Julie Harris, who won a Tony Award for Best Actress in a Play for her performance at the 23rd Tony Awards. Actresses June Allyson, Joan Fontaine, and Zsa Zsa Gabor succeeded her on Broadway in the play, which ran for 780 performances.

== Reception ==
The film received mostly lukewarm reviews. In the Chicago Sun-Times, Roger Ebert gave the movie 2 1/2 stars, writing:

Forty Carats, a movie made from a Broadway play which, in turn, was adapted from a French play (can we expect the stage musical soon?), attacks the [age difference] problem with a great deal of romantic zeal. But it’s a little hard to care. We don’t really mind whether she’s 40 and he’s 22; what we care about is what they’re like, and whether as fictional characters they can hold our interest. They don’t, alas, and so the movie bogs down in the sort of theoretical dialog George Bernard Shaw would have written had he lacked wit.
