= Milton Katselas =

American stage and film director and producer (1933–2008)

- Born: Milton George Katselas; December 22, 1933; Pittsburgh, Pennsylvania, U.S.
- Died: October 24, 2008 (aged 74); Los Angeles, California, U.S.
- Occupations: Director, acting instructor, coach, producer

Milton George Katselas (December 22, 1933 – October 24, 2008) was an American-Greek director and producer of stage and film, as well as a Hollywood acting instructor and coach who trained under Elia Kazan and Lee Strasberg at the acclaimed Actors Studio in New York City. In 1978, he acquired the Beverly Hills Playhouse, where he taught a master class for many years.

Katselas was a Scientologist and some former students have alleged that his acting classes were used as recruitment for the Church of Scientology, while others have stated Katselas never mentioned or spoke about Scientology during classes.

== Professional life ==
=== Early years ===
Katselas was born in Pittsburgh, Pennsylvania, to Greek immigrant parents, who owned a small restaurant outside the gates of a Westinghouse Electric plant. When Milton was 14 years old, his father went into the movie theater business and ran a local theater company of Greek actors. Milton Katsalas later adjusted his surname to Katselas.

After high school, he set off for Pittsburgh's Carnegie Tech (now Carnegie Mellon) to study theater. On a visit to New York, he sneaked in to watch Lee Strasberg's acting class where he also saw renowned director Elia Kazan on the street and chased him down. "I talked to him in Greek, and he talked with me"... [H]e told me, `When you finish college, come see me.'", Katselas recalled. Following graduation in 1954, he began studying with Strasberg and serving as an apprentice to Kazan.

=== Theater and film producer ===
After working with several other big-name directors, including Joshua Logan, Joseph Anthony, and Sanford Meisner, Katselas struck out on his own, beginning with the original 1960 Off-Broadway production of Edward Albee's The Zoo Story. This was followed by another critical success the following year, Michael Shurtleff's Call Me By My Rightful Name. He was nominated for a Tony Award for the Broadway production of Leonard Gershe's Butterflies Are Free in 1969, and also directed the 1972 movie version starring Goldie Hawn, Edward Albert, and Eileen Heckart, who won an Academy Award for her role.

In 1973 he reunited with Gershe and Albert for the film version of 40 Carats. His other credits include the Broadway shows Camino Real and The Rose Tattoo, local productions of The Seagull, Romeo and Juliet, and Streamers - all of which won him L.A. Drama Critics Circle awards for best direction.

In 1983, Katselas directed a revival of Noël Coward's Private Lives, the only Broadway stage production in which Elizabeth Taylor and Richard Burton co-starred together. However, after the show was panned in its Boston tryout, Taylor, who was a producer, fired Katselas, yet he retained his directing credit for the Broadway run. He also directed the screen adaptation of Mark Medoff's When You Comin' Back, Red Ryder?

=== The Playhouse ===
In 1978, Katselas founded an acting school in Los Angeles called the Beverly Hills Playhouse, where he gave acting classes for 30 years until his death in 2008.

He had a wide range of students, including Gene Hackman, Jenna Elfman, George Clooney, Alec Baldwin, Giovanni Ribisi, Tom Selleck, Michelle Pfeiffer, Ted Danson, Tony Danza, Jeffrey Tambor, Tyne Daly, Lakshmi Manchu, Doris Roberts, Anne Archer, Kate Hudson, Kim Cattrall, Thaao Penghlis, Robert Urich, and Patrick Swayze.

Some students reportedly felt alienated by the unspoken pressure to join the Church of Scientology, however. While Katselas was highly regarded as a teacher, his classes remained controversial.

In his later years, Katselas became disaffected with post-Hubbard Scientology. He eventually had a break with the organisation, when a Scientologist named Grant Cardone sent an e-mail accusing Katselas of improper sexual conduct with his students. Following the incident, a number of Scientologist actors left the school.

=== Books ===
Katselas was the author of two books.

- Dreams into action : Getting what you want! (1996) ISBN 0787104930
- Acting Class: Take a Seat (2008) ISBN 1597775924, 9781597775922

== Personal life ==
Katselas was a long-time Scientologist, having been introduced to the cult in 1965, and had attained the Scientology state of Operating Thetan. While his relationship with Church of Scientology management broke down in his later years, he remained dedicated to Scientology and L. Ron Hubbard to his death.

Katselas died of heart failure on October 24, 2008, aged 74, at the Los Angeles hospital Cedars-Sinai Medical Center.

Katselas was portrayed by actor James Franco in the Sal Mineo biopic Sal, which Franco also directed.
