= Pat Crawford Brown =

American actress (1929–2019)

- Publicity Photo of Pat Crawford Brown
- Born: June 29, 1929; New York City, New York, U.S.
- Died: July 2, 2019 (aged 90); Woodland Hills, California, U.S.
- Occupation: Actress
- Years active: 1985–2012
- Spouse: Calvin B. Brown (m. 1961; died 1976)
- Children: 1

Pat Crawford Brown (June 29, 1929 – July 2, 2019) was an American actress.

== Life and career ==
Brown was born in New York City and worked as an English teacher at Carson High School. After retiring from her teaching job, she made her screen debut in 1985 made-for-television movie Do You Remember Love. The following years she made various guest-starring appearances on television series such as The Twilight Zone, Who's the Boss?, Mama's Family, Designing Women, Murder, She Wrote and Murphy Brown. From 1989 to 1997 she had a recurring role as Mrs. Alma Thorkelson on the ABC sitcom Coach. She also appeared in feature films, including Elvira: Mistress of the Dark (1988), The Rocketeer (1991), Sister Act (1992) and its sequel Sister Act 2: Back in the Habit (1993), Reality Bites (1994), Forces of Nature (1999) and Playing Mona Lisa (2000). She played Joan Collins's character mother in the 2001 made-for-television movie These Old Broads.

On television, Brown is best known for her role as Ida Greenberg in the ABC comedy-drama series, Desperate Housewives, a role she played from 2004 to 2007. She also had recurring roles on daytime soap operas General Hospital and Days of Our Lives and the prime time dramas Gilmore Girls and General Hospital: Night Shift.

== Personal life and death ==
Brown was a resident of the Motion Picture & Television Country House and Hospital in Woodland Hills, California, where she died on July 2, 2019, 3 days after her 90th birthday.

== Selected filmography ==
- The Twilight Zone (1986, TV series) as Mrs. Finnegan (segment "The Little People of Killany Woods")
- Sledge Hammer! (1987, TV series) as Woman at Bar
- Beauty and the Beast (1987, TV series) as Old Woman #1
- L.A. Law (1987, TV series) as Jury Foreman #2
- Highway to Heaven (1987, TV series) as Betty
- Who's the Boss? (1988, TV series) as Mary
- 18 Again! (1988) as Old Lady
- Elvira, Mistress of the Dark (1988) as Mrs. Meeker
- Liberace: Behind the Music (1988, TV movie) as Nancy
- Cannibal Women in the Avocado Jungle of Death (1989) as Secretary
- Moonlighting (1989, TV series) as Cleaning Lady
- Dear John (1989, TV series) as Kirk's Mom
- Mama's Family (1989, TV series) as Joanne Mickley
- The Famous Teddy Z (1989, TV series)
- Murder, She Wrote (1989-1992, TV series) as Cashier / Woman
- Coach (1989-1997, TV series) as Secretary / Mrs. Alma Thorkelson
- Designing Women (1990, TV series) as Constance Pine
- Knots Landing (1990, TV series) as Owner
- False Identity (1990) as Nellie
- Out of Sight, Out of Mind (1990) as Nurse
- A Gnome Named Gnorm (1990) as Female Mourner
- Murphy Brown (1990-1995, TV series) as Sister Mary Margaret O'Brien
- Dream On (1990, TV series) as Frieda
- Quantum Leap (1990, TV series) as Woman
- Carol & Company (1990, TV series) as Miss Underwood
- Matlock (1991, TV series) as Old Woman
- Get a Life (1991, TV series) as Aunt Molly
- Growing Pains (1991, TV Series) as Kathleen
- Amen (1991, TV series) as Winnie
- The Rocketeer (1991) as Mrs. Pye
- Wild Orchid II: Two Shades of Blue (1991) as Ms. Earlane
- Demonic Toys (1992) as Mrs. Michaels
- Empty Nest (1992, TV series) as Melba
- Sister Act (1992) as Choir Nun #3
- Love Is Like That (1992) as Woman in Pink
- Bodies of Evidence (1992, TV series) as Mrs. Polk
- Middle Ages (1992, TV series)
- Step by Step (1992, TV series) as Mrs. Hill
- The Wonder Years (1992, TV series) as Mrs. Ruebner
- Dinosaurs (1992, TV series) as Stenographer (voice)
- Camp Wilder (1993, TV series) as Aunt Ida
- Reasonable Doubts (1993, TV series) as Mrs. McGurdy
- Homefront (1993, TV series)
- Love & War (1993, TV series) as Mrs. Kittock
- Bakersfield P.D. (1993, TV series) as Woman
- Time Trax (1993, TV series) as Paul's Wife
- Sister Act 2: Back in the Habit (1993) as Choir Nun #3
- Days of Our Lives (1993-2009, TV series) as Sister Agnes / Minnie
- Reality Bites (1994) as Cashier
- Tom (1994, TV series) as Miss Broch
- Little Giants (1994) as Louise
- Sister, Sister (1994-1995, TV series) as Ms. Little / Maid
- The Fresh Prince of Bel-Air (1994-1996, TV series) as Lady / Nurse
- Mad About You (1994, TV Series) as Neighbor #1
- Hearts Afire (1995, TV series) as Landlady
- Lois & Clark: The New Adventures of Superman (1995, TV series) as Mrs. Macarthy
- Married... with Children (1995, TV series) as Bingo Caller
- Kirk (1995, TV series) as Aunt Zelda
- Deadly Games (1996, TV series) as Woman
- The Crew (1996, TV series) as Ida
- Home Improvement (1996, TV series) as Mrs. Kluzewski
- ER (1996, TV series) as Mrs. Votey
- The Faculty (1996, TV series) as Alice Munson
- Ellen (1996, TV series) as Rose
- Unhappily Ever After (1996, TV series) as Sadie Glickstein
- Dark Skies (1996, TV series) as Clarice Brown, Hotel Clerk
- The Pretender (1996, TV series) as Millie Reynolds
- Beverly Hills, 90210 (1996, TV series) as Salvation Army Soldier
- The John Larroquette Show (1996, TV series) as Chris' Mom
- Chicago Sons (1997, TV series) as Woman
- Profiler (1997, TV series) as Sister Mary
- Soul Man (1997, TV series) as Gladys
- Romy and Michele's High School Reunion (1997) as Truck Stop Waitress
- George & Leo (1997, TV series)
- Caroline in the City (1997, TV series) as Sadie
- Suddenly Susan (1997-1999, TV series) as Mildred / Freida
- NYPD Blue (1997-2000, TV series) as Old Woman / Mrs. Klein
- Alright Already (1997, TV series) as Lina
- Night Man (1997, TV series) as Mrs. Simon
- Johnny Skidmarks (1998) as Mrs. Starkey
- Fired Up (1998, TV series) as Sister Mary Grace
- Something So Right (1998, TV series) as Mrs. Van Owl
- Beyond Belief: Fact or Fiction (1998, TV series) as Annie
- The Brian Benben Show (1998, TV series) as Heddy Bolinski
- The Godson (1998) as Toenail Lady
- DiResta (1998, TV series) as Grandma Wooly-Hat
- Guys Like Us (1998, TV series) as Mary
- Jack Frost (1998) as Scorekeeper
- L.A. Doctors (1998, TV series) as Old Lady Patient
- Johnny Skidmarks (1998)
- Two Guys, a Girl and a Pizza Place (1999, TV series) as Librarian
- Forces of Nature (1999) as Florence
- Norm (1999, TV series) as Mrs. Lefkowitz
- Grown Ups (1999, TV series) as The Elderly Woman
- Malcolm & Eddie (1999, TV series) as Peeping Tonya
- One World (1999, TV series) as Mrs. Annandale
- The Drew Carey Show (1999, TV series) as Mrs. Hopkins
- 3rd Rock from the Sun (2000, TV series) as Mrs. Larson
- Judging Amy (2000-2002, TV series) as Waitress Polly / Waitress Louise
- Playing Mona Lisa (2000) as Grandma Ida Weinberg
- The Woman Every Man Wants (2001)
- The Division (2001, TV series) as Pappy
- Nikki (2001, TV series) as Mrs. Hiebaum
- These Old Broads (2001, TV movie) as Miriam Hodges
- State of Grace (2001, TV series)
- Danny (2001, TV series) as Mrs. Landis
- The Medicine Show (2001) as Crickety Nurse
- The Steve Harvey Show (2001, TV series) as Ms. Hirschfeld
- The Proud Family (2001, TV series) as Agnus (voice)
- Lizzie McGuire (2002, TV series) as Mrs. Robinson
- Buffy the Vampire Slayer (2002, TV series) as Old Lady
- MDs (2002, TV series) as Very Old Woman
- Gilmore Girls (2002-2004, TV series) as Mrs. Cassini
- A.U.S.A. (2003, TV series) as Grandmother
- Daredevil (2003) as Old Lady on Plane
- The Bernie Mac Show (2003, TV series)
- Stuck on You (2003) as Mimmy
- Memron (2004, TV movie) as Mrs. Westerfeld
- Monk (2004, TV series) as Nana Parlo
- Arrested Development (2004, TV series) as Old Woman
- According to Jim (2004, TV series) as Mrs. Reifschneider
- Strong Medicine (2004, TV series) as Millie - Pharmacist
- Desperate Housewives (2004-2007, TV series) as Ida Greenberg
- Jack & Bobby (2005, TV series) as Old Lady
- Suits on the Loose (2005) as Sister Cutbank
- Crazylove (2005) as Old Lady
- Emily's Reasons Why Not (2006, TV miniseries) as Grandma Beatrice
- You, Me and Dupree (2006) as Aunt Kathy
- El Cortez (2006) as Helena
- The War at Home (2006, TV series) as Kathy
- CSI: Crime Scene Investigation (2007, TV series) as Female Dental Patient
- Norbit (2007) as Mrs. Henderson
- Ghost Whisperer (2007, TV series) as Bertha
- Raines (2007, TV series) as Margo, Glaucoma Sufferer
- General Hospital: Night Shift (2007, TV series) as Mrs. Storch
- Family Guy (2007, TV series) as Lead Sanka Dancer
- 10 Items or Less (2008, TV series) as Mrs. Brown
- Uncross the Stars (2008) as Norma
- Dark Streets (2008) as Delores
- Swingtown (2008, TV series) as Norma
- General Hospital (2008, TV series) as Mrs. Albright
- It's Always Sunny in Philadelphia (2008, TV series) as Woman - Historical Society
- Numb3rs (2008, TV series) as Older Woman
- How I Met Your Mother (2009, TV Series) as Thelma
- Meteor (2009, TV miniseries) as Elderly Lady
- Super Capers (2009) as Gertrude
- Saving Grace (2009, TV series) as Ethel Mae Wilson
- Labor Pains (2009) as Aunt Betty
- Mending Fences (2009, TV movie) as County Clerk
- Community (2010, TV series) as Pierce's Mom (voice)
- Parks and Recreation (2011, TV series) as Andy's Grandma
- Mad Love (2011, TV series) as Ruth
- Rules of Engagement (2011, TV series) as Pearl
- Oliver's Ghost (2011, TV movie) as Betty
- Bones (2011, TV series) as Landlady
- 2ND Take (2011) as Miriam
- Fred: The Show (2012, TV series) as Mrs. Haberstan
- Divorce Invitation (2012) as Myrtle

Other

- Wainy Days (2011, internet series) as Patricia
- L.A. Noire (2011, Video game) as Florence Jenkins (voice)
