= Butterflies Are Free (play) =

Dramatic play by Leonard Gershe

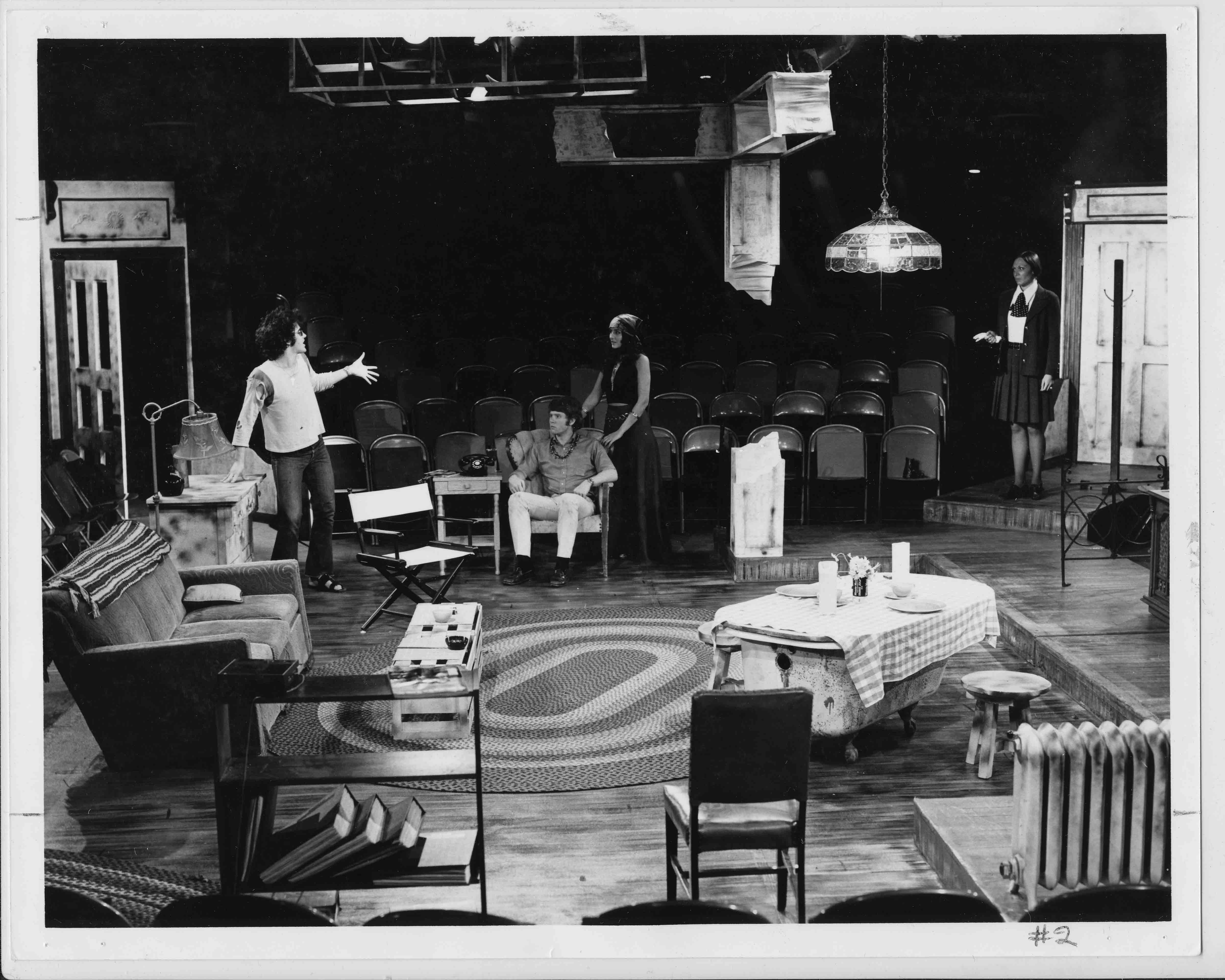
- Written by: Leonard Gershe
- Characters: Don Baker; Mrs. Baker; Jill Tanner; Ralph Austin
- Original language: English
- Genre: Comedy
- Setting: Don Baker's apartment, at East 11th Street, New York

Premiere
- Date premiered: 21 October 1969
- Place premiered: Booth Theatre

Butterflies Are Free is a play by Leonard Gershe. The plot revolves around a blind man living in downtown Manhattan whose controlling mother disapproves of his relationship with a free-spirited hippie.

Directed by Milton Katselas, the original Broadway production opened on October 21, 1969, at the Booth Theatre, where it ran for 1,128 performances. The original cast consisted of Keir Dullea, Blythe Danner, Eileen Heckart, and Paul Michael Glaser. In 1972, it was adapted into a film starring Edward Albert and Goldie Hawn.

Silent film star Gloria Swanson, well known for her role of Norma Desmond in the film Sunset Boulevard, played the mother role (Mrs. Baker) in Butterflies Are Free in 1971–72 in the national tour and on Broadway.
