= Luke Yankee =

American Playwright

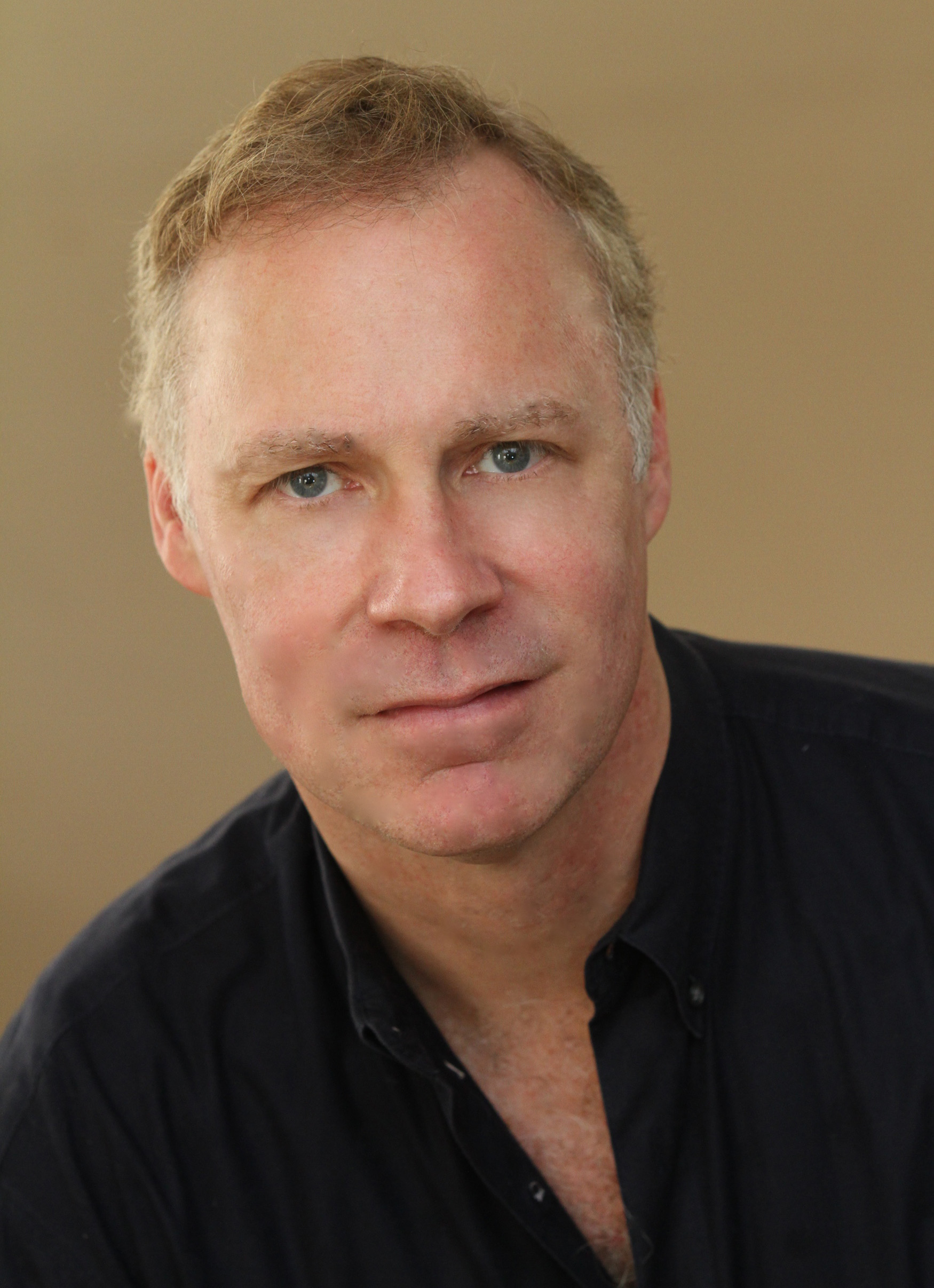
- Born: February 7, 1960 (age 66); Stamford, CT
- Education: Juilliard School; New York University (BA); University of California, Riverside (MFA)
- Occupations: Playwright, director, writer
- Employer(s): California State University, Fullerton and Chapman University
- Website: yankeehillproductions.com

Luke Yankee (born February 7, 1960) is an American writer, playwright, and director. He has also taught playwriting at California State University, Fullerton and Chapman University.

== Early life and education ==
Yankee is the son of actress Eileen Heckart. His father, Jack Yankee, was an insurance broker. He studied at the University of California, Riverside, at New York University, and at the Juilliard Drama School in New York. He has an MFA in Playwriting and Screenwriting. He is married to Don Hill, the Chair of Drama at the University of California, Irvine.

== Career ==
Yankee worked as producing artistic director of the Long Beach Civic Light Opera. He assistant directed six Broadway plays for such directors as Harold Prince, Ellis Rabb, Brian Murray, and Gerald Freedman. His play, The Last Lifeboat, has had 55 productions in North America. His memoir Just Outside the Spotlight: Growing Up with Eileen Heckart was published in 2006 by Backstage Books. Michael Musto described it as "one of the most compassionate and illuminating showbiz books ever written."

In 2010, his play The Jesus Hickey was staged and produced by the Katselas Theatre Company, starring Harry Hamlin. The same play received both the TRU Voices Award, and the Joel and Phyllis Ehrlich Award.

Yankee's latest work is Marilyn, Mom & Me; a play about his mother's intense friendship with Marilyn Monroe while shooting the film Bus Stop. It was the recipient of the 2022 Stanley Award for Drama.

He is the Head of Playwriting at California State University, Fullerton and an adjunct professor at Chapman University.

== Bibliography ==
=== Plays ===
- A Place at Forest Lawn, co-authored with James Bontempo, (Dramatists Play Service, 2007) ISBN 9780822222002
- The Last Lifeboat, (Dramatists Play Service, 2014) ISBN 9780822230243
- The Jesus Hickey, (Independently Published, 2017) ISBN 9781521359792
- The Man Who Killed the Cure (Independently Published, 2017) ISBN 9781521356654
- Marilyn, Mom & Me (2019)

=== Nonfiction ===
- Just Outside the Spotlight: Growing Up with Eileen Heckart (Back Stage Books, 2006) ISBN 9780823078882
- The Art of Writing for the Theatre: An Introduction to Script Analysis, Criticism, and Playwriting (Bloomsbury Publishing, 2022) ISBN 9781350155602
