= The Defender (Studio One) =

- Studio One episodes
- William Shatner and Steve McQueen in "The Defender"
- Episode nos.: Season 9 Episodes 20 and 21
- Directed by: Robert Mulligan
- Written by: Reginald Rose
- Original air dates: February 25, 1957; March 4, 1957

Guest appearances
- Ralph Bellamy as Walter Preston; William Shatner as Kenneth Preston; Steve McQueen as Joseph Gordon; Martin Balsam as Francis Toohey

Episode chronology
← Previous "The Hollywood Complex"	Next → "A Child Is Waiting"

"The Defender" is an American television play broadcast live in two parts on February 25, 1957, and March 4, 1957, as part of the CBS television series Studio One. A courtroom drama, it was written by Reginald Rose and directed by Robert Mulligan. The cast included Ralph Bellamy and William Shatner as a father-son defense team, Steve McQueen as the defendant, and Martin Balsam as the prosecutor. Rose later spun off the concept into a full series entitled The Defenders, starring E. G. Marshall and Robert Reed in Bellamy and Shatner's roles.

== Plot ==
Walter Preston and his son Kenneth, the latter fresh out of law school, defend Joseph Gordon, who is charged with felony murder. Gordon is accused of robbing the apartment of a psychiatrist, Victor Wallach, and strangling his wife. Francis Toohey is the prosecutor.

The story turns on Walter Preston's belief that his client is guilty, and his son's belief that the client is innocent. Gordon is consistent throughout by insisting he is innocent.

Gordon was the delivery boy for a butcher shop. He was assigned to deliver meat to the Wallach apartment on the morning of the crime. He did not return to the butcher shop after the delivery. The police found him at his home and arrested him there.

The victim's maid testifies that she was hit by an intruder, who she identifies as Gordon. When she regained consciousness, Mrs. Wallach was dead. Despite efforts to shake her story on cross-examination, the maid insists that Gordon was the man who struck her. She has no doubt.

Father and son have different views regarding how far to go to raise doubt in the minds of jurors. The prosecutor pursues the case aggressively. Walter is reluctant to use some aggressive tactics, telling his son that he has to live in this community. Kenneth asks, "Shouldn't there be someone to fight as hard to free him as Toohey fights to kill him?"

Walter agrees to use his son's proposed tactic. He recalls the maid to identify the man who hit her. She identifies the man sitting at the defense table. The defense then calls Joseph Gordon, who rises from a seat in the audience. The man sitting at the defense table, the man identified by the maid, is a law student having nothing to do with the case but who bears some resemblance to the defendant.

While expressing disapproval of the tactic, the court grants a motion for a directed verdict and frees the defendant. Walter remains unsure whether his client was guilty and whether he did the right thing.

== Cast ==
The cast included performances by:

- Ralph Bellamy as Walter Preston (defense attorney)
- Martin Balsam as Francis Toohey (prosecutor)
- Steve McQueen as Joseph Gordon (defendant)
- William Shatner as Kenneth Preston (defense attorney)
- Ian Wolfe as Judge Marsala
- Vivian Nathan as Mrs. Gordon
- David J. Stewart as Dr. Victor Wallach
- Dolores Sutton as Norma Lane
- Eileen Ryan as Betsy Fuller
- Arthur Storch as Seymour Miller
- Rosetta LeNoire as Mary Ellen Bailey
- John McGovern as Dr. Horace Bell
- Rudy Bond as Peter D'Agostino
- Michael Higgins as Sgt. James Sheeley
- Russell Hardie as 1st Guard
- Milton Selzer as 2nd Guard
- Iggie Wolfington as Court Clerk
- Frank Marth as First Reporter
- Ed Asner as Juror

Betty Furness presents Westinghouse appliances in breaks after each of the acts.

== Production ==
The program aired as a live television play on CBS on successive Monday nights, February 25 and March 4, 1957. Herbert Brodkin was the producer and Robert Mulligan the director. Reginald Rose, who also wrote Twelve Angry Men (1954), wrote the story specially for Studio One.

It was reported to be the first live television drama divided for broadcast on separate nights, and one of the first cliffhanger television broadcasts. One critic objected to the decision, noting that splitting of dramas into multiple parts has the effect of "leaving audiences dangling on the cliff". Writer Reginald Rose opted for a two-parter because he felt the telling of the story required nearly two hours of air time.

== Subsequent series ==
The story led Reginald Rose to develop a spin-off series, The Defenders, which began airing in 1961. E. G. Marshall played Walter Preston (renamed Lawrence Preston) and Robert Reed as Kenneth Preston. The Show ran for four seasons and 132 episodes.

The program was revived in 1997 by the Showtime cable network. Showtime producer Stan Rogow hearkened back to the original program, noting that Studio One in 1957 "had a stature and tone to it, and nothing like that is done anymore". Three films aired from 1997 to 1998: Payback, Choice of Evils and Taking the First. Marshall reprised his role as Lawrence Preston for the first two films; it marked his final acting performance prior to his death. Beau Bridges played Lawrence's previously unmentioned son Don, whilst Martha Plimpton played the late Kenneth Preston's daughter M.J.

== Boston Legal ==
Clips of the play were incorporated into a 2007 episode of the television series Boston Legal, which also starred William Shatner. The clips were used as flashback sequences for Shatner's character, Denny Crane. "Son of the Defender" was episode 18 of season 3, and aired on April 3, 2007.

== Reception ==
After the first hour, Jack Gould of The New York Times wrote that it was "not especially impressive" and was "consumed by rather tedious exposition that easily could have been summarized in far less time".

Critic Bill Ladd was more positive. He praised the "superb" camera direction and Rose's "compelling" story, and compared the courtroom drama to Twelve Angry Men and The Caine Mutiny Court-Martial. He also praised Bellamy's performance: "Bellamy is at his best, than which there is no better."

After the second hour aired, critic Hope Pantell praised the "fine acting", and praised the courtroom scenes as "well done and fascinating".

When the show re-aired more than 30 years later, David Bianculli called it "one of the best dramas of the so-called Golden Age of Television".
