= Charles T. Knight =

American sound engineer (1931–2023)

- Born: October 18, 1931
- Died: June 29, 2023 (aged 91)
- Occupation: Sound engineer
- Years active: 1964–1994

Charles Tucker Knight (October 18, 1931 – June 29, 2023) was an American sound engineer. He was nominated for an Academy Award in the category Best Sound for the film Butterflies Are Free. He worked on more than 40 films between 1964 and 1994.

Knight died on June 29, 2023, at the age of 91.

== Selected filmography ==
- Butterflies Are Free (1972)
