= The Defenders (1961 TV series) =

1961 American television series

- Title card
- Created by: Reginald Rose
- Starring: E. G. Marshall; Robert Reed; Joan Hackett; Polly Rowles
- Theme music composer: Leonard Rosenman
- Country of origin: United States
- No. of seasons: 4
- No. of episodes: 132 (list of episodes)

Production
- Executive producer: Herbert Brodkin
- Producers: Bob Markell; George Justin
- Production locations: Filmways Studios, New York City
- Editor: Lyman Hallowell
- Camera setup: Single-camera
- Running time: 45–48 minutes
- Production companies: Plautus Productions; Defender Productions; CBS Television Network

Original release
- Network: CBS
- Release: September 16, 1961 – May 13, 1965

The Defenders is an American courtroom drama television series that ran on CBS from 1961 to 1965. It was created by television writer Reginald Rose, and stars E. G. Marshall and Robert Reed as father-and-son defense attorneys Lawrence and Kenneth Preston. Original music for the series was scored by Frank Lewin and Leonard Rosenman. The series was spun off from the Studio One episode "The Defender", which starred Ralph Bellamy and William Shatner as the Prestons.

This series is not related to the 2010s CBS series of the same name.

== Plot ==
Lawrence Preston (Marshall) and Kenneth Preston (Reed) are father-and-son defense attorneys who specialized in legally complex cases, with defendants such as neo-Nazis, conscientious objectors, demonstrators of the Civil Rights Movement, a schoolteacher fired for being an atheist, an author accused of pornography, and a physician charged in a mercy killing.

== Cast ==
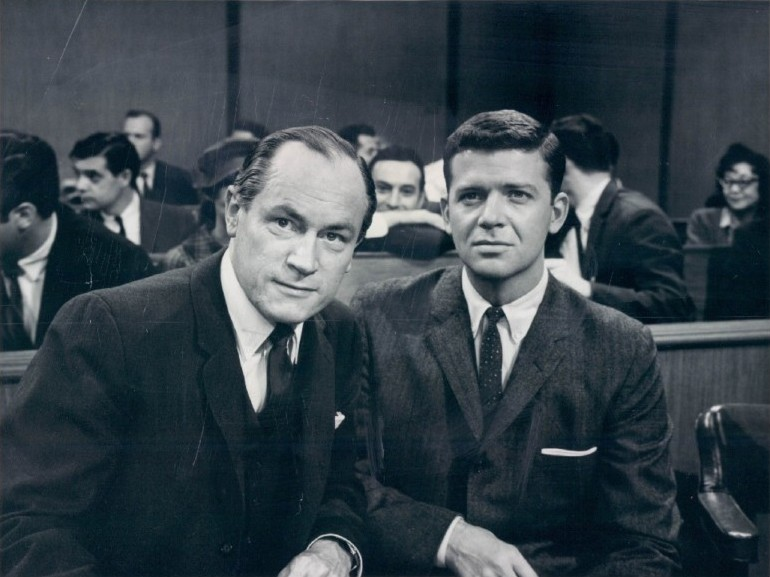
E. G. Marshall and Robert Reed

- E. G. Marshall as Lawrence Preston
- Robert Reed as Kenneth Preston
- Polly Rowles as Helen Donaldson, the Prestons' secretary (24 episodes 1961–1962)
- Joan Hackett as Joan Miller, Kenneth's girlfriend (5 episodes 1961–1962)

Several other actors appeared numerous times throughout the series. John Boruff, J.D. Cannon, Lonnie Chapman, and Ossie Davis each appeared in eight episodes; Walter Klavun appeared in seven episodes; Marc Connelly, Robert Gerringer, Murray Hamilton, Judson Laire, Kermit Murdock, Frank Overton, Lester Rawlins, and Dolph Sweet each appeared six times; and Simon Oakland, William Shatner (who had starred as Kenneth Preston in the original Studio One episode), and six others each appeared in five episodes.

== Episodes ==
Season	Episodes	Originally released	
Season	Episodes	First released	Last released
1	32	September 16, 1961	May 26, 1962
2	34	September 15, 1962	May 25, 1963
3	36	September 28, 1963	June 27, 1964
4	30	September 24, 1964	May 13, 1965

== Production ==
=== Development ===
The series was a slight reworking of Rose's 1957 two-part drama, The Defender, from the anthology series Studio One. In the original program, Ralph Bellamy played the father and William Shatner played his son. Shatner guest-starred in various roles in the later series, and the original drama later was incorporated into an episode of his series, Boston Legal.

According to creator Reginald Rose, "the law is the subject of our programs: not crime, not mystery, not the courtroom for its own sake. We were never interested in producing a 'who-done-it' which simply happened to be resolved each week in a flashy courtroom battle of wits." And unlike Perry Mason, which also ran on CBS, victory was "far from certain on The Defenders—as were morality and justice."

Topics featured in the series included abortion, capital punishment, "no-knock" searches, custody rights of adoptive parents, the insanity defense, the "poisoned fruit doctrine," immigration quotas, the Hollywood blacklist, jury nullification, and Cold War visa restrictions.

Writers for the show included Rose in many early episodes, with later episodes by Albert "Al" Ruben and Ernest Kinoy – both Jewish Americans holding socially liberal views. It was thought the move to "ratings graveyard" Thursday nights after a successful prime time reign on Saturday evenings was a conservative corporate device to force the socially conscious program into cancellation, which it ultimately did.

=== Controversial episodes ===
A 1962 episode entitled "The Benefactor"—in which the father–son legal team defended an abortion care provider—was the most controversial; all of the series' three regular advertisers (Brown & Williamson, Lever Brothers, and Kimberly-Clark) refused to sponsor the episode, so it was only transmitted after a last-minute sponsor was found, Speidel, for a discounted advertising rate. The Canadian Broadcasting Corporation banned this episode when it was first shown on April 28. In 2008, this incident was used as the basis for a second season episode of the drama Mad Men, set in the 1960s.

The December 7, 1963, episode, "Climate of Evil," was originally titled "The Gentle Assassin" but was changed two weeks earlier in the aftermath of the John F. Kennedy assassination. In addition, the January 4, 1964, episode, "Clare Cheval Died in Boston," was originally scheduled for the weekend of the assassination, and subsequently had reference to "President Kennedy" deleted from the episode.

=== Broadcast history ===
Note: The most frequent time slot for the series is in bold text.

- **Saturday at 8:30–9:30 p.m. on CBS: September 16, 1961 – May 25, 1963; November 30, 1963 – June 27, 1964**
- Saturday at 9:00–10:00 p.m. on CBS: September 28 – November 16, 1963
- Thursday at 10:00–11:00 p.m. on CBS: September 24, 1964 – May 13, 1965

== Reception ==
=== Awards ===
The Defenders won 14 Primetime Emmy Awards (including three in a row for Outstanding Drama Series) and received an additional eight nominations.

Year	Category	Recipient	Episode	Result
1962	Outstanding Program Achievement in the Field of Drama			Won
1962	Outstanding Continued Performance by a Lead Actor in a Series	E. G. Marshall		Won
1962	Outstanding Directorial Achievement in Drama	Franklin J. Schaffner		Won
1962	Outstanding Writing Achievement in Drama	Reginald Rose		Won
1963	Outstanding Program Achievement in the Field of Drama			Won
1963	Outstanding Continued Performance by a Lead Actor in a Series	E. G. Marshall		Won
1963	Outstanding Directorial Achievement in Drama	Stuart Rosenberg	"The Madman"	Won
1963	Outstanding Writing Achievement in Drama	Robert Thom; Reginald Rose	"The Madman"	Won
1963	Outstanding Single Performance by an Actor in a Leading Role	Don Gordon (for playing "Joey Tassili")	"The Madman"	Nominated
1963	Outstanding Single Performance by an Actress in a Leading Role	Sylvia Sidney (for playing "Adela")	"The Madman"	Nominated
1963	The Program of the Year		"The Madman"	Nominated
1963	Outstanding Achievement in Art Direction and Scenic Design	Willard Levitas		Nominated
1963	Outstanding Achievement in Film Editing for Television	Sid Katz		Won
1964	Outstanding Program Achievement in the Field of Drama			Won
1964	Outstanding Directorial Achievement in Drama	Paul Bogart	"Moment of Truth"	Nominated
1964	Outstanding Directorial Achievement in Drama	Stuart Rosenberg	"Blacklist"	Nominated
1964	Outstanding Writing Achievement in Drama – Original	Ernest Kinoy	"Blacklist"	Won
1964	Outstanding Single Performance by an Actor in a Leading Role	Jack Klugman (for playing "Joe Larch")	"Blacklist"	Won
1964	The Program of the Year		"Blacklist"	Nominated
1965	Outstanding Program Achievements in Entertainment	Bob Markell		Nominated
1965	Outstanding Individual Achievements in Entertainment – Directors	Paul Bogart	"The 700 Year Old Gang"	Won
1965	Outstanding Individual Achievements in Entertainment – Writers	David Karp	"The 700 Year Old Gang"	Won

The Museum of Broadcast Communications called it "perhaps the most socially conscious series the medium has ever seen", a show "singularly resonant with New Frontier liberalism".

In 2002, The Defenders was ranked #31 on TV Guide's 50 Greatest TV Shows of All Time, and in 2013 TV Guide ranked it #8 in its list of The 60 Greatest Dramas of All Time, while the Writers Guild of America ranked it – and Gunsmoke – #84 on their list of the 101 Best Written TV Series.

=== Ratings ===
- 1961–1962: #26 (22.4)
- 1962–1963: #18 (23.9)
- 1963–1964: N/A
- 1964–1965: N/A

As a top 30 series, The Defenders has an average rating of 23.2.

== Home media ==
On July 12, 2016, Shout! Factory released the complete first season on DVD in Region 1.

== Sequel and spin-offs ==
The 1997 version

A re-envisioned version of the series aired on the Showtime network in 1997 as a trilogy of television films. Still called The Defenders, it featured E. G. Marshall in his original role as Lawrence Preston. New co-stars were Beau Bridges as Don Preston, a previously unmentioned second son of Lawrence, and Martha Plimpton as M.J., the daughter of Ken Preston, who is said to have died (as had Reed in 1992). Don and M.J. worked as lawyers and carried on the family legacy. Marshall died after the completion of the second episode ("Choice of Evils"). Production was halted, and the remaining episode, "Taking the First," aired as a movie special in 1998.

Episodes	Date of Release
The Defenders: Payback	October 12, 1997
The father of a child rape victim (John Larroquette) kills the rapist, who was freed from prison after only a few years. The victim was admitted to a mental health facility after several suicide attempts, the older daughter ran away, and the father became fixated on revenge. The Prestons need to devise a defense strategy that takes into account his and his family's mental health.
The Defenders: Choice of Evils	January 8, 1998
Don Preston defends a journalist charged in a wrongful death.Although he is found guilty, a bureaucratic error causes him to be inadvertently released from prison, sending him on the run and leading to an event where a police officer is killed trying to apprehend him again.
The Defenders: Taking the First	October 28, 1998
After attending a protest given by a visiting professor and organized by a racist organization, a group of college boys beat a young Latino to death. The Prestons are hired to defend one of the boys, the grandson of Lawrence's old friend. The victim's brother, a law student, convinced Don to bring a wrongful death lawsuit against the bigot and his group after persuading their client to accept a plea and testify against the others, despite accusations that they may be violating the First Amendment.

== References in other media ==
The second season of Mad Men contains an episode named "The Benefactor" that featured a brief clip from The Defenders' episode of the same name. In the Mad Men episode, the Sterling Cooper advertising agency is trying to secure sponsors for The Defenders' episode, which contains a plot involving abortion (originally telecast on April 28, 1962), after the regular sponsors pulled out because they claimed the episode (and subject matter) was too controversial. The episode also offers a fictional backstory for the episode; that it was written for the third season of the series but rejected by the network for the usage of abortion as a plotline. The following season, the writers produced a script that revolved around the theme of cannibalism but the episode was rejected by the director who was assigned to film the episode due to the content. The director's refusal led to the network being forced to film the abortion-centric script, which an executive assigned to find advertisers for the show proclaims was the plan all along.

In his memoir, Randy Barnett, a law professor at Georgetown, credits watching The Defenders as a child as the inspiration for him to enter the legal profession.

The Defenders is also referenced in a season three episode of The Dick Van Dyke Show, "Laura's Little Lie", in which Laura Petrie (Mary Tyler Moore) asks her husband Rob (Dick Van Dyke) to "stop acting like E.G. Marshall," to which Rob responds by asking her to "stop acting like a guilty defendant."
