= Call Me by My Rightful Name =

1961 American play

- Original language: English
- Written by: Michael Shurtleff
- Based on: The Whipping Boy by S.F. Pfoutz

Premiere
- Date: January 31, 1961
- Place: One Sheridan Square, New York City
- Directed by: Milton Katselas
- Original run: 127 performances

Call Me By My Rightful Name is a 1961 American play by Michael Shurtleff which is based on the novel The Whipping Boy by S.F. Pfoutz.

== Synopsis ==
Set in the early 1960s, Call Me By My Rightful Name is a three-act play about two Columbia University roommates, one white and one black, caught in a love triangle over a white woman.

== Production ==
The production premiered Off-Broadway on January 31, 1961, at One Sheridan Square (now the Axis Theatre) where it ran for a total of 127 performances. The production was directed by Milton Katselas and designed by Charles Evans. It starred Robert Duvall as Doug, Joan Hackett as Chris, Alvin Ailey as Paul, Robert Hogan as Elliot, and Milo Boulton and Dortha Duckworth as Mr. and Mrs. Watkins. Hackett won a Theatre World Award, an Obie Award, and a Drama Desk Award for her performance.

== Censorship ==
In July 1962, the Rockport, Massachusetts Board of Selectmen denied a production company, planning to stage Call Me By My Rightful Name and The Zoo Story, access to the city high school's auditorium. The plays were banned for being "quite sexy."

== Film ==
In 1972, Shurtleff wrote and directed a film version of the play. It starred Don Murray (who also worked on the screenplay with Shurtleff), Otis Young, Cathy Lee Crosby, Kent Smith, Edith Atwater, and Gary Clarke. Murray supposedly wanted Sidney Poitier to play opposite him in the film originally. The film is extremely rare, but was shown at a few events in the 2010s by Murray himself.
