= Joan Hackett =

American actress (1934–1983)

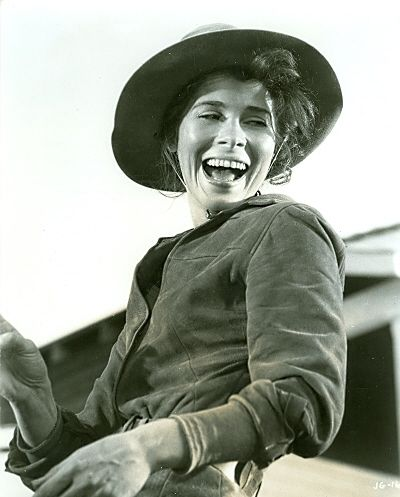
- Hackett in the 1969 production Support Your Local Sheriff!
- Born: Joan Ann Hackett; March 1, 1934; New York City, New York, U.S.
- Died: October 8, 1983 (aged 49); Los Angeles, California, U.S.
- Resting place: Hollywood Forever Cemetery
- Occupation: Actress
- Years active: 1959–1983
- Spouse: Richard Mulligan (m. 1966; div. 1973)
- Relatives: Annette McCarthy (niece)

Joan Ann Hackett (March 1, 1934 – October 8, 1983) was an American actress. in film, television, and theater. She played roles in The Group (1966), Will Penny (1968), Support Your Local Sheriff! (1969), The Last of Sheila (1973), and The Terminal Man (1974). In 1982, Hackett was nominated for an Academy Award for Best Supporting Actress; she was also the recipient of a Golden Globe Award for Best Supporting Actress – Motion Picture for her performance as Toby Landau in the 1981 film Only When I Laugh. During the course of her career, Hackett was nominated for a Primetime Emmy Award, a BAFTA Award, a Photoplay Award, and a Golden Laurel Award; she also received an Obie Award, a Drama Desk Award, and a Theatre World Award. In 1978, she starred as Christine Mannon in the PBS miniseries version of Mourning Becomes Electra.

== Early life ==
Hackett was born in the East Harlem neighborhood of New York City, the daughter of John and Mary (née Esposito) Hackett, and grew up in Elmhurst, Queens, where she became a model and dropped out during her final year of high school. She had a sister, Theresa, and a brother, John. Hackett's mother was from Naples, Italy, and her father had Irish ancestry, and they raised her Catholic and sent her to Catholic schools.

== Acting career ==
Hackett debuted in 1959 with the role of Gail Prentiss in the television series, Young Doctor Malone. In 1961, she won a Theatre World Award, an Obie Award for Best Actress, and a Drama Desk Award for her off-Broadway portrayal of Chris in Michael Shurtleff's play Call Me By My Rightful Name.

She had a recurring role in the CBS legal drama The Defenders (1961–1965) as the fiancée of Kenneth Preston (played by Robert Reed). She appeared regularly in scenes with both lead actors. She had a leading role in The Twilight Zone episode "A Piano in the House". In the 1963–1964 season, she guest-starred on Channing, an ABC drama about college life starring Jason Evers and Henry Jones.

Hackett had one of the starring roles in the 1966 Sidney Lumet film The Group, along with Candice Bergen, Larry Hagman, Richard Mulligan, Joanna Pettet, and others. She was nominated for the BAFTA Award for Best Foreign Actress for this role.

She also played the role of Catherine Allen in the 1968 Western Will Penny, with Charlton Heston in the title role. Hackett also had notable parts in the classic Western comedy Support Your Local Sheriff!, with James Garner, and the 1973 murder mystery The Last of Sheila. After this, she primarily had parts in TV movies and on episodes of TV series.

She starred in the 1974 adaption of Michael Crichton's novel The Terminal Man, along with actors George Segal, Donald Moffat, and Richard Dysart.

In 1976, she played the female lead in the Disney adventure film Treasure of Matecumbe. In 1978, she appeared in a PBS adaptation of Mourning Becomes Electra as Christine Mannon. Her performance in that production earned her some of the best reviews of her career. The same year, she was a regular in the cast of the short-lived CBS situation comedy Another Day, portraying Ginny Gardner.

She appeared in the September 22, 1979, episode "Grass Is Always Greener" of The Love Boat as Julie McCoy's former classmate from the line's cruise-director course.

Hackett won the Golden Globe Award for Best Supporting Actress - Motion Picture and was nominated for the Academy Award for Best Supporting Actress for her performance in the 1981 film Only When I Laugh, the last film she made before her death. She could also be seen in Paul Simon's 1980 film One-Trick Pony.

== Personal life and death ==
From 1966 to 1973, she was married to actor Richard Mulligan, who was also cast in The Group.

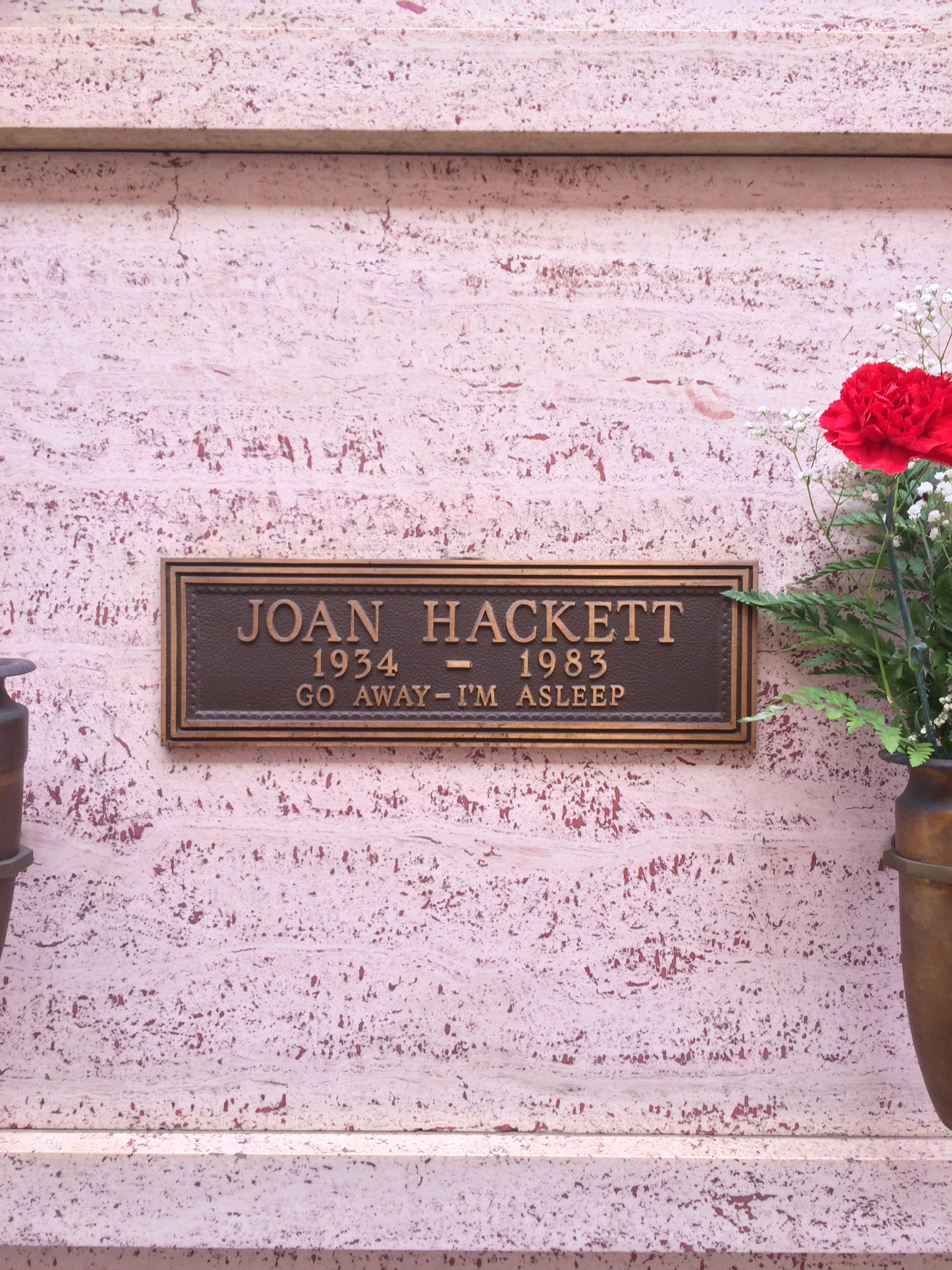
Crypt of Joan Hackett at Hollywood Forever

Hackett was diagnosed with cancer in 1981. She died of ovarian cancer on October 8, 1983, at Encino Hospital in the Encino neighborhood of Los Angeles. A funeral mass was held on Wednesday, October 12, 1983, at St. Victor Catholic Church in Los Angeles, California. Her remains are entombed in the Abbey of the Psalms Mausoleum at Hollywood Forever Cemetery, where her epitaph reads: "Go Away — I'm Asleep".

== Filmography ==
- Come Again to Carthage (1961 TV movie) - Sister Agnes
- The Group (1966) - Dottie Renfrew Latham (theatrical feature film debut)
- Will Penny (1968) - Catherine Allen
- Assignment to Kill (1968) - Dominique Laurant
- Support Your Local Sheriff! (1969) - Prudy Perkins
- The Young Country (1970 TV movie) - Clementine Hale
- How Awful About Allan (1970 TV movie) - Olive
- The Other Man (1970 TV movie) - Kathy Maitland
- Hollywood Television Theater: U.S.A. (1971 TV movie) -/-
- Five Desperate Women (1971 TV movie) - Dorian
- Lights Out (1972 TV movie) - Sabina the Dollmaker (segment "When Widows Weep")
- Rivals (1972) - Christine
- Class of '63 (1973 TV movie) - Louise Swerner
- The Last of Sheila (1973) - Lee Parkman
- The Terminal Man (1974) - Dr. Janet Ross
- Reflections of Murder (1974 TV movie) - Claire Elliott
- Mackintosh and T.J. (1975) - Maggie
- The American Woman: Portraits of Courage (1976 TV movie) - Belva Lockwood
- Treasure of Matecumbe (1976) - Lauriette Paxton
- Stonestreet: Who Killed the Centerfold Model? (1977) - Jessica Hillard
- Dead of Night (1977) - Alma (segment "Bobby")
- The Possessed (1977 TV movie) - Louise Gelson
- Pleasure Cove (1979 TV movie) - Martha Harrison
- Mr. Mike's Mondo Video (1979) - Self
- The North Avenue Irregulars (1979) - Volunteering Parishioner (uncredited)
- The Long Days of Summer (1980 TV movie) - Millie Cooper
- One Trick Pony (1980) - Lonnie Fox
- Harnessing the Sun (1981) - Self / Narrator
- Only When I Laugh (1981) - Toby Landau
- The Long Summer of George Adams (1982 TV movie) - Norma Adams
- The Escape Artist (1982) - Aunt Sibyl
- Paper Dolls (1982 TV movie) - Julia Blake
- A Girl's Life (1983 TV movie) - Evelyn
- Flicks - Captain Grace (segments for "New Adventures of the Great Galaxy") (1983; final film appearance)

== Television series ==
- 1959-1960: Young Dr. Malone (Seasons 1, 2 Episodes: appearances in several) playing "Gail Prentiss" (various air dates; television acting debut)
- 1959: The Further Adventures of Ellery Queen (Season 1, Episode 20: "Chauffeur Disguise") -/- (aired February 20); (Season 1, Episode 21: "Shadow of the Past") -/- (aired February 27)
- 1960: Diagnosis: Unknown (Season 1, Episode 7: "Gina, Gina") -/- (aired September 6)
- 1960: Armstrong Circle Theater (Season 11, Episode 5: "The Immortal Piano") -/- (aired December 21)
- 1961: Alfred Hitchcock Presents (Season 6, Episode 34: "Servant Problem") playing "Sylvia" (aired June 6)
- 1961, 1962: The Defenders (Season 1, Episode 1: "The Quality of Mercy") playing "Joan Miller" (aired September 16, 1961); (Season 1, Episode 6: "The Boy Between") playing "Joan Miller" (aired October 21, 1961); (Season 1, Episode 10: "The Man with the Concrete Thumb") playing "Joan Miller" (aired November 18, 1961); (Season 1, Episode 14: "The Prowler") playing "Joan Miller" (aired December 16, 1961); (Season 2, Episode 19: "Poltergeist") playing "Joan Miller" (aired January 26, 1963)
- 1961: Ben Casey (Season 1, Episode 11: "A Certain Time, a Certain Darkness") playing "Ellen Parker" (aired December 11, 1961); (Season 4, Episode 13: "This Wild, Wild, Wild Waltzing World") playing "Ellen Parker" (aired December 14, 1964)
- 1962: The New Breed (Season 1, Episode 15: "Cross the Little Line") playing "Angie" (aired January 9)
- 1962: The Twilight Zone (Season 3, Episode 22: "A Piano in the House") playing "Esther Fortune" (aired February 16)
- 1962: Dr. Kildare (Season 1, Episode 23: "The Witch Doctor") playing "Karen Welby" (aired March 8)
- 1962: Gunsmoke (Season 7, Episode 25: "The Widow") playing "Mady Arthur" (aired March 24)
- 1962: Theatre '62 (Season 1, Episode 7: "Rebecca") playing the "Second Mrs. de Winter" (aired April 8)
- 1962: Alcoa Premiere (Season 1, Episode 26: "A Place to Hide") playing "Sue Wilson" (aired May 22); (Season 2, Episode 11: "The Way from Darkness") playing "Edith Fletcher" (aired December 13)
- 1963: Combat! (Season 1, Episode 19: "The Chateau") playing "Gabrielle" (aired February 12)
- 1963: The Doctors and the Nurses (Season 1, Episode 19: "The Life") playing "Margaret Hunter" (aired February 14)
- 1963: Empire (Season 1, Episode 31: "Between Friday and Monday") playing "Dolores Lanza" (aired May 7)
- 1963: The Great Adventure (Season 1, Episode 9: "The Outlaw and the Nun") playing "Sister Blandina" (aired December 6)
- 1964: Channing (Season 1, Episode 15: "A Rich, Famous, Glamorous Folk Singer Like Me") playing "Djuna Phrayne" (aired January 8)
- 1964: The Alfred Hitchcock Hour (Season 2, Episode 21: "Beast in View") playing "Helen Clarvoe" (aired March 20)
- 1964: The Wednesday Play (Season 1, Episode 4: "Pale Horse, Pale Rider") playing "Miranda" (aired November 11)
- 1964, 1965: Chrysler Theatre (Season 1, Episode 27: "Echo of Evil") playing "Florence" (aired December 1, 1964); (Season 3, Episode 8: "The Highest Fall of All") playing "Lili Strode" (aired June 5, 1965)
- 1965, 1972: Bonanza (Season 6, Episode 17: "Woman of Fire") playing "Margarita Miguel" (aired January 17, 1965); (Season 13, Episode 16: "Second Sight") playing "Judith Corman" (aired January 9, 1972)
- 1966: Court Martial (Season 1, Episode 8: "Judge Them Justly") playing "Lt. Christie Foster" (aired June 3)
- 1966: Run for Your Life (Season 2, Episode 6: "The Sex Object") playing "Diana Murrow" (aired October 17)
- 1967: Judd, for the Defense (Season 1, Episode 14: "The Living Victim") playing "Ruth Massey" (aired December 15)
- 1968: The Name of the Game (Season 1, Episode 2: "Witness") playing "Jean Thorndyke" (aired September 27)
- 1969: Daniel Boone (Season 5, Episode 26: "A Pinch of Salt") playing "Theodora Liggett" (aired May 1)
- 1969: Allen Ludden's Gallery (Season 1, Episode 42: "Episode #1.42") as Self / Guest (aired August 19)
- 1970, 1971: Love, American Style (Season 1, Episode 14: "Love and the Pick-Up/Love and the Proposal/Love and the Fighting Couple") playing "Linda" (aired January 5, 1970); (Season 2, Episode 21: "Love and the Boss/Love and the Jury/Love and the Logical Explanation/Love and the Pregnancy") -/- (aired February 19, 1971)
- 1971 Dan August (Season 1, Episode 26: "The Assassins") playing "Nancy Williams" (aired April 8)
- 1971: Alias Smith and Jones (Season 1, Episode 15: "The Legacy of Charlie O'Rourke") playing "Alice Banion" (aired April 22)
- 1972: The Dick Cavett Show (Season 6, Episode **: "27 April 1972") as Self / Guest (aired April 27)
- 1974: The Merv Griffin Show (Season 11, Episode **: "23 July 1974") as Self / Guest (aired July 23)
- 1974, 1978: The Mike Douglas Show (Season 13, Episode 224: "Episode #13.224") as Self / Guest (aired July 25, 1974); (Season 17, Episode 136: "Episode #17.136") as Self / Guest (aired April 6, 1978)
- 1975: Bicentennial Minutes (Season 1, Episode 315: "Episode #1.315") as Self / Narrator (aired May 11)
- 1976: Dinah! (Season 2, Episode 118: "Episode #2.118") as Self / Guest (aired March 4)
- 1977: The Magical World of Disney (Season 24, Episode 2: "The Treasure of Matecumbe") playing "Lauriette Paxton" (aired October 2)
- 1978: Another Day (Season 1, Episode 1: "Episode #1.1") playing "Ginny Gardner" (aired April 8); (Season 1, Episode 2: "Episode #1.2") playing "Ginny Gardner" (aired April 15); (Season 1, Episode 3: "Episode #1.3") playing "Ginny Gardner" (aired April 22); (Season 1, Episode 4: "Episode #1.4") playing "Ginny Gardner" (aired April 29)
- 1978: Mourning Becomes Electra (TV miniseries) playing "Christine Mannion"
  - (Season 1, Episode 1: "The Secret") (aired August 20)
  - (Season 1, Episode 2: "The Homecoming") (aired August 27)
  - (Season 1, Episode 3: "The Hunted") (aired September 3)
  - (Season 1, Episode 4: "An Act of Justice") (aired September 10)
- 1979: $weepstake$ (Season 1, Episode 3: "Vince, Pete and Patsy, Jessica and Rodney") playing "Jessica" (aired February 9)
- 1979: Trapper John, M.D. (Season 1, Episode 10: "The Surrogate") playing "Wilma" (aired December 23)
- 1979: Taxi (Season 2, Episode 2: "Honor Thy Father") playing "Charlotte Reiger", sister of "Alex Reiger" (aired September 18)
- 1979: The Love Boat (Season 3, Episode 3: "The Grass Is Always Greener/Three Stages of Love/Oldies But Goodies") playing "Tina Phillips" (aired September 22)
- 1980: Saturday Night Live (Season 5, Episode 12: "#98 – Kirk Douglas/Sam & Dave") as Self - uncredited cameo (aired February 23)
- 1981: The Toni Tennille Show (Season 1, Episode 98: "Episode #1.98") as Self / Guest (aired February 23)
- 1982: The 39th Annual Golden Globe Awards (TV special) as Self / Winner (aired January 30)
- 1982: The 54th Annual Academy Awards (TV special) as Self / Nominee (aired March 29)
- 1982: Great Performances (Season 11, Episode 3: "Great Performances' 10th Anniversary Celebration") as Self (aired December 6)
- 1983: The 40th Annual Golden Globe Awards (TV special) as Self / Presenter (aired January 29)
- 1985: Tales of the Unexpected (Season 8, Episode 4: "Scrimshaw") playing "Brenda" (aired July 28; final performance of her multi-medium career)
- 1989: American Masters (Season 4, Episode 1: "Howard Clurman: A Life in Theatre") as Self - archive footage (aired June 26)
- 2020: Cineficción Radio (Season 2, Episode 3: "Horror antológico") as "Mother" (segment "Bobby" from Dead of Night) - archive footage (aired July 12)

== Selected theatre credits ==
- Night Watch, playing "Elaine Wheeler", Morosco Theatre, New York City, NY – 1972
- The Rothschilds, playing "Gutele Rothschilds", Lunt-Fontanne Theatre, New York City, NY – 1970
- Park, playing "Young Woman", Center Stage, Baltimore, MD; John Golden Theatre, New York City, NY – 1970
- A Place for Polly, playing "Angela", Westport Country Playhouse, Westport, CT; also, productions in Fairfield, CT and Ivortyton, CT – 1969
- Peterpat, playing "Pat", Longacre Theatre, New York City, NY – 1964-1965
- She Didn't Say Yes, Pocono Playhouse, Mountainhome, PA – 1963
- Dear Me, the Sky is Falling: A Comedy in Three Acts, playing "Debbie Hirsch", Music Box Theatre, New York City, NY – 1963
- Journey to the Day, Westport County Playhouse, Westport, CT – 1961
- Two Queens of Love and Beauty, Bucks County Playhouse, New Hope, PA – 1961
- Call Me By My Rightful Name, playing "Chris", One Sheridan Square, New York City, NY – 1961
- Laurette, playing "Marguerite", Shubert Theatre, New Haven, CT – 1960
- Much Ado About Nothing, playing "Lady", Lunt-Fontanne Theatre, New York City, NY – 1959
- The Play's the Thing, Princeton University Playhouse, Princeton, NJ – 1959
- A Clearing in the Woods, One Sheridan Square, New York City, NY – 1959

== Selected radio credits ==
- 1974, 1975: CBS Radio Mystery Theater (Season 1, Episode 25: "# 25 – Mother Love"), playing "Paula Richards" (aired January 30, 1974); (Season 2, Episode 42: "#235 – The Eye of Death"), playing "Sandy" (aired March 7, 1975)

== Accolades ==
- Call Me By My Rightful Name — Winner — Obie Award for Distinguished Performance by an Actress (1961)
- Call Me By My Rightful Name — Winner — Theatre World Award for Best Performance (1961)
- Call Me By My Rightful Name — Winner — Drama Desk-Vernon Rice Award for Lead Performance (1961)
- Ben Casey — Nominee — Primetime Emmy Award for Outstanding Performance in a Supporting Role by an Actress (for episode "A Certain Time, A Certain Darkness") (1962)
- The Group — Nominee — Golden Laurel Award for New Faces, Female, 9th place (1966)
- The Group — Nominee — BAFTA Award for Best Foreign Actress (1967)
- Gold Medal for Favorite Female Star — Nominee — Photoplay Awards (1976)
- Only When I Laugh — Winner — Golden Globe Award for Best Performance by an Actress in a Supporting Role - Motion Picture (1982)
- Only When I Laugh — Nominee — Academy Award for Best Performance by an Actress in a Supporting Role (1982)
