= Butterflies Are Free =

1972 film by Milton Katselas

- Theatrical release poster
- Directed by: Milton Katselas
- Screenplay by: Leonard Gershe
- Based on: Butterflies Are Free by Leonard Gershe
- Produced by: M.J. Frankovich
- Starring: Goldie Hawn; Eileen Heckart; Edward Albert
- Cinematography: Charles B. Lang
- Edited by: David Blewitt
- Music by: Bob Alcivar
- Production company: Frankovich Productions
- Distributed by: Columbia Pictures
- Release date: July 6, 1972
- Running time: 109 minutes
- Country: United States
- Language: English
- Budget: $1.2 million
- Box office: $6.7 million (US and Canada rentals)

Butterflies Are Free is a 1972 American comedy-drama film directed by Milton Katselas from a screenplay by Leonard Gershe, based on Gershe's 1969 play. The film stars Goldie Hawn, Eileen Heckart, and Edward Albert. It follows Jill Tanner (Hawn), a free-spirited young woman who becomes romantically involved with her new next-door neighbor, a blind man named Don Baker (Albert), who has recently moved out to live on his own. However, Don's overly protective mother (Heckart) tries to end their romance, fearing that Jill will break her son's heart.

The film was released in the United States on July 6, 1972 by Columbia Pictures. It received mostly positive reviews from critics, with particular praise for the performances of Hawn, Heckart, and Albert as well as Leonard Gershe's screenplay. It was a box-office success, grossing roughly $6.7 million on a $1.2 million budget. While the original play was set in East Village, Manhattan, the screenplay written for the film was set in the 1355, 1355A, 1357, 1359 Grant Avenue building in North Beach, San Francisco.

At the 30th Golden Globe Awards, the film received five nominations including Best Motion Picture – Musical or Comedy, Best Actress in a Motion Picture – Musical or Comedy for Hawn, Best Actor in a Motion Picture – Musical or Comedy and Most Promising Newcomer – Male for Albert, and Best Original Song for "Carry Me". Although Heckart was not among the Golden Globe nominees for the film, she won the Academy Award for Best Supporting Actress at the 45th Academy Awards. The film also was nominated for Best Cinematography (the eighteenth and final nomination for legendary cinematographer Charles Lang) and Best Sound for Charles T. Knight and Arthur Piantadosi. Leonard Gershe also received a nomination for Best Comedy – Adapted from Another Medium at the 25th Writers Guild of America Awards.

== Plot ==
In the bohemian San Francisco of the early 1970s, 19-year-old Jill Tanner rents an apartment to discover her next-door neighbor, 20-year-old aspiring singer-songwriter Don Baker, peering through a window. The next day, through their paper-thin walls, she overhears him arguing with his overprotective mother Florence on the phone. Intrigued, Jill introduces herself to Don.

Don explains that he has made a pact with Florence, allowing him to live independently for two months without her interference. Jill, who had a six-day marriage at the age of 16, reveals that she has sworn off commitments to avoid hurting people. When she learns that Don is blind, he tells her that he possesses "shadow vision", which gives him the ability to sense obstacles in front of him and thus avoid potential accidents.

Jill, who has a strong desire for freedom, shares her favorite quote with Don, which she misattributes to Mark Twain. Don informs her that the quote is from Charles Dickens' Bleak House: "I only ask to be free. The butterflies are free. Mankind will surely not deny to Harold Skimpole what it concedes to the butterflies." Don incorporates the quote into a song he is writing, naming it "Butterflies Are Free".

Jill encourages Don to wear stylish clothes instead of the clothes his mother bought him. As they walk together to a bohemian clothing store on Union Street, Jill tells Don about her upcoming audition with theater director Ralph Santore, who wishes to marry her. At Jill's suggestion, Don purchases a bold outfit that makes him look like a musician.

Back at his apartment, Don discusses Florence's children's books featuring the character Donnie Dark, a young blind superhero. Despite his mother's intentions to inspire him, Don felt inadequate under her high expectations. Jill proposes that they unlock the door connecting their apartments so they can become closer. She offers for Don to touch her face, allowing him to "see" her, and they eventually sleep together.

The next morning, Jill expresses her joy over their intimacy and shares her keepsake box's secrets with Don. They are interrupted when Florence arrives unexpectedly, appalled by Don's living conditions and Jill's presence in her underwear. Don and Jill arrange to have dinner together that evening, and she returns to her apartment to prepare for her audition. Florence questions Jill's suitability and persistently tries to convince Don to come home with her, but he refuses and leaves to go shopping for dinner.

In Don's absence, Florence invites Jill to lunch, hoping to persuade her to leave Don. Florence discusses his previous involvement with a woman who motivated him to leave home, and with whom he fell in love, but who ultimately broke his heart. She insists that Don needs a woman who can commit to him, citing Jill's inability to sustain a long-term relationship. Despite admitting she might not be the ideal woman for Don, Jill argues that Florence is the one stunting his growth and self-confidence.

That night, while awaiting Jill's return, Don scolds Florence for secretly talking to Jill earlier. When Jill finally arrives with Ralph, she reveals that she has been given a minor role in the play, which will include a nude scene. Jill announces her decision to move in with Ralph, which devastates Don. After Jill and Ralph leave, Don tearfully implores Florence to take him back home. Florence shares that the motivation behind the Donnie Dark books was to help Don confront his fears. She admits that she struggles to accept that she is no longer needed, but leaves after embracing her son.

As Jill returns to Don's apartment to say goodbye, he deduces that she does not love Ralph. She reaffirms her freedom to leave whenever she wants and reveals that she fears hurting Don. He accuses her of being emotionally crippled because of her refusal to commit to a relationship. Jill leaves to meet Ralph, and Don has a breakdown while listening to "Butterflies Are Free". Shortly afterwards, Jill returns and tells Don that she has had a "shadow vision" of an obstacle in front of her: Ralph. They laugh and hug.

== Cast ==
- Goldie Hawn as Jill Tanner
- Edward Albert as Don Baker
- Eileen Heckart as Mrs. Baker
- Michael Glaser as Ralph Santori
- Michael Warren as Roy

== Reception ==
=== Critical response ===
Variety wrote: "Although the setting has been changed from New York to San Francisco for no apparent reason, Leonard Gershe's screen adaptation of his successful Broadway play ... is an excellent example of how to switch from one medium to another without sacrificing any of the qualities which makes the original version such a success." The review further praises the acting of Goldie Hawn, saying: "Miss Hawn, funny and touching, is a delight throughout and Miss Heckart finally gets another film role that enables her to display the versatility that has been evident for a long time in her stage roles."

Vincent Canby of The New York Times wrote: "The film is not completely without intelligence, but its intelligence is in the service of the kind of sentimentality that shrivels the mind, like something left in water too long."

Charles Champlin of the Los Angeles Times wrote that "a very well-made commercial play—funny, sentimental, positive, tight—has become a well-made commercial movie—light, bright, extremely well and personably acted, and preserving the intimacy and the unity which were the virtues of the play."

Gene Siskel of the Chicago Tribune gave the film three stars out of four and wrote that "one of the attractive aspects of Butterflies Are Free is that each of the three characters is incomplete and flawed. To that degree the Leonard Gershe screenplay approaches believability, and this is a rare quality for a tear-jerker to have."

Gary Arnold of The Washington Post stated "While the material is essentially shallow and often insufferable in its sentimental opportunism, Gershe and Katselas demonstrate some theatrical talent and mechanical aptitude ... The play itself is nothing to brag about, but I doubt if one could transpose it much more adroitly and presentably. Instead of inflating or vulgarising this frail property, Katselas tries to keep it intimate and engaging."

John Gillett of The Monthly Film Bulletin wrote "Occasionally it is all rather twee, plumping for the easy emotional response and the easy tear; yet much of the writing has sharpness and bite, notably in the initial meetings between Jill and Don, when they talk out their pasts together and improvise meals on the floor."

Jay Cocks of Time pointed out the talent of Goldie Hawn, stating: "Goldie Hawn, as the girl next door, has come a long way from her giddy role in Laugh-In; she is often genuinely touching." Cocks praised the acting of both Edward Albert and Eileen Heckart: "Edward Albert, the son of actor Eddie Albert, is creditable as the blind boy, and Eileen Heckart is appropriately hateful as the mother, although she is unable to be convincing in her transformation. But then nobody could be."

On Rotten Tomatoes, the film holds an approval rating of 69%, based on 13 reviews, with an average rating of 6.2/10.

=== Accolades ===
Award	Category	Recipient	Result	Ref.
Academy Awards	Best Supporting Actress	Eileen Heckart	Won	
Academy Awards	Best Cinematography	Charles Lang	Nominated	
Academy Awards	Best Sound	Charles T. Knight and Arthur Piantadosi	Nominated	
Golden Globe Awards	Best Motion Picture – Musical or Comedy	Milton Katselas and M.J. Frankovich	Nominated	
Golden Globe Awards	Best Actor in a Motion Picture – Musical or Comedy	Edward Albert	Nominated	
Golden Globe Awards	Best Actress in a Motion Picture – Comedy or Musical	Goldie Hawn	Nominated	
Golden Globe Awards	Best Original Song – Motion Picture	"Carry Me"; Music by Bob Alcivar; Lyrics by Randy McNeill	Nominated	
Golden Globe Awards	Most Promising Newcomer – Male	Edward Albert	Won	
Writers Guild of America Awards	Best Comedy – Adapted from Another Medium	Leonard Gershe	Nominated	

== See also ==
- List of American films of 1972
