= Out of Sight, Out of Mind (film) =

- Directed by: Greydon Clark
- Screenplay by: John Platt; Roy Langsdon
- Produced by: Richard L. Albert
- Starring: Susan Blakely; Edward Albert; Lynn-Holly Johnson; Wings Hauser; Richard Masur
- Cinematography: Nicholas Josef von Sternberg
- Edited by: Robert Edwards
- Music by: Peter Melnick
- Release date: 1990
- Running time: 94 minutes
- Country: United States
- Language: English

Out of Sight, Out of Mind (also known as Sight Unseen and Out of Sight, Out of Her Mind) is a 1990 psychological horror film directed by Greydon Clark and starring Susan Blakely, Edward Albert, Lynn-Holly Johnson, Wings Hauser, and Richard Masur. It follows a woman who, after surviving a fatal attack by a serial killer, is plagued by visions of her murdered daughter.

== Cast ==
- Susan Blakely as Alice Lundgren
- Edward Albert as Kurt Williams
- Wings Hauser as Victor Lundgren
- Lynn-Holly Johnson as Kathy Jordan
- Richard Masur as Dr. Meltzner
- Jessica Player as Tracy Lundgren
- Edwina Moore as Midge
