= Edward Albert =

American actor (1951–2006)

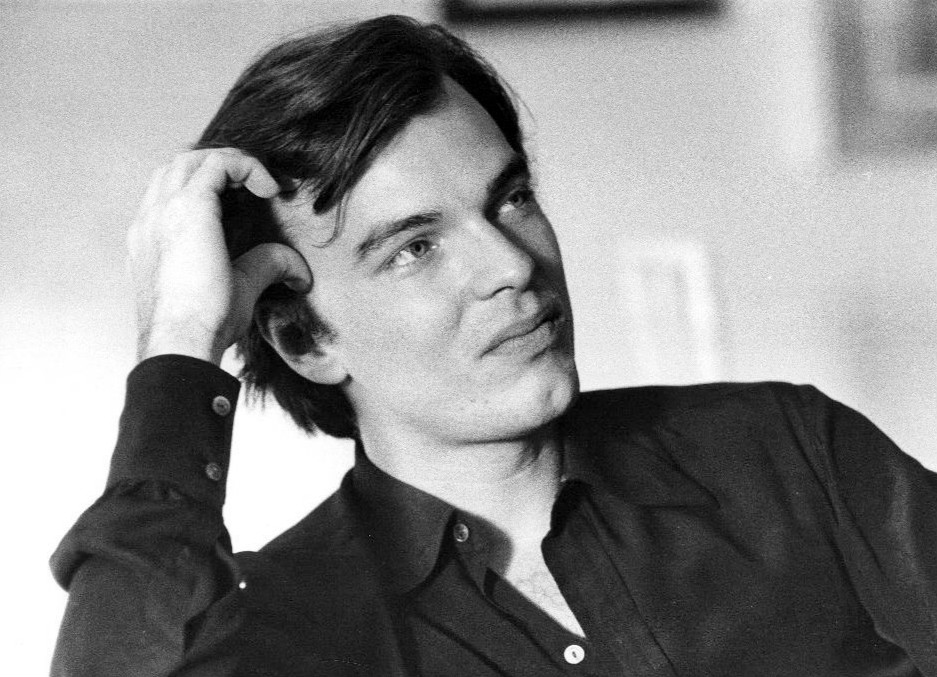
- Albert in 1977
- Born: Edward Laurence Albert; February 20, 1951; Los Angeles, California, U.S.
- Died: September 22, 2006 (aged 55); Malibu, California, U.S.
- Other name: Eddie Albert Jr.
- Occupation: Actor
- Years active: 1965–2006
- Spouse: Katherine Woodville (m. 1978)
- Children: 1
- Parent(s): Eddie Albert; Margo

Edward Laurence Albert (February 20, 1951 – September 22, 2006) was an American actor. The son of actor Eddie Albert and Mexican actress Margo, he starred opposite Goldie Hawn in Butterflies Are Free (1972), a role for which he won a Golden Globe Award for New Star of the Year and was nominated for Best Actor in a Motion Picture – Musical or Comedy. Albert starred in more than 130 films and television series, including Midway, The Greek Tycoon, Galaxy of Terror, The House Where Evil Dwells, The Yellow Rose, Falcon Crest and Power Rangers Time Force.

== Early life ==
Edward Laurence Albert was born in Los Angeles, California, to actor Eddie Albert (1906–2005), and Mexican actress María Margarita Guadalupe Teresa Estela Bolado Castilla y O'Donnell, who went by the name Margo (1917–1985).

Albert attended Oxford University and studied psychology at the University of California, Los Angeles.

== Career ==
Albert made his motion picture debut in the 1965 drama The Fool Killer, as a runaway orphan who crossed paths with a disturbed Civil War veteran, played by Anthony Perkins. He played opposite Goldie Hawn as a blind man in the film Butterflies Are Free (1972), for which he won a Golden Globe Award for New Star of the Year and was nominated for the Golden Globe Award for Best Actor in a Motion Picture – Musical or Comedy.

In 1973, Albert starred with Liv Ullmann in the film adaptation of the play 40 Carats. He played a U.S. Navy fighter pilot in the 1976 film Midway, portraying the son of a naval captain, played by Charlton Heston.

Albert made a guest appearance in a 1976 episode of the NBC dramatic series Gibbsville. He also was featured in the Gene Hackman suspense film The Domino Principle (1977) and the drama The Greek Tycoon (1978) with Anthony Quinn and Jacqueline Bisset. In 1981, Albert starred with Ray Walston and Erin Moran in Roger Corman's horror film Galaxy of Terror.

During the 1983–1984 television season, Albert starred as Quisto Champion on the NBC series The Yellow Rose with Sam Elliott, Cybill Shepherd and David Soul. He had a recurring role in the 1980s television series Beauty and the Beast, in which he played Elliot Burch, a New York developer who loves series heroine, Catherine Chandler, played by Linda Hamilton.

Albert played Mr. Collins, father to Wesley Collins, the Red Ranger in Power Rangers Time Force. He appeared in the 1987 film The Underachievers and voiced the superhero Daredevil in two episodes of Spider-Man: The Animated Series in the 1990s.

In 1992's The Ice Runner, Albert played an agent arrested in Russia who tries to escape from prison. In 1993, he made a guest appearance in the television show Dr. Quinn, Medicine Woman as Dr. William Burke. In Guarding Tess (1994), Albert played the son of former First Lady Tess Carlisle (Shirley MacLaine).

== Personal life ==
Albert was an advocate of the environment and the rights of Native Americans, especially the Chumash tribe. He served on the California Coastal Commission and the California Native American Heritage Commission. The Escondido Canyon was renamed in his honor as the Edward Albert Escondido Trail and Waterfalls.

In the 1970s, Albert was engaged to actress Kate Jackson. In 1978, Albert married actress Katherine Woodville. The couple had a daughter, Thaïs Carmen Albert.

Albert was diagnosed with lung cancer in 2005 and died at age 55 on September 22, 2006, 16 months after his father died at age 99.

== Filmography ==
=== Film ===
Year	Title	Role	Notes
1965	The Fool Killer	George Mellish	
1972	Butterflies Are Free	Don Baker	Golden Globe Award for New Star of the Year – Actor; Nominated – Golden Globe Award for Best Actor - Motion Picture Musical or Comedy
1973	40 Carats	Peter Latham	
1976	Midway	Lieutenant Tom Garth	
1977	The Domino Principle	Ross Pine	
1977	The Purple Taxi	Jerry Keen	
1978	The Greek Tycoon	Nico Tomasis	
1978	The Squeeze	Jeff Olafsen	
1980	When Time Ran Out	Brian	
1981	Galaxy of Terror	Cabren	
1982	Butterfly	"Wash" Gilespie	
1982	A Time to Die	Michael Rogan	
1982	The House Where Evil Dwells	Ted Fletcher	
1983	Veliki transport	Danny	
1984	Ellie	Tom	
1986	Getting Even	"Tag" Taggar	
1987	Distortions	Jason Marks	
1987	Terminal Entry	Captain Danny Jackson	
1987	The UnderAchievers	Danny Warren	
1988	The Rescue	Commander Merrill	
1989	Fist Fighter	Harry "Punchy" Moses	
1989	Mind Games	Dana Lund	
1989	Accidents	Eric Powers	
1989	Wild Zone	Colonel Elias Lavara	
1990	Out of Sight, Out of Mind	Kurt Williams	
1992	The Ice Runner	Jeffrey West	
1992	Exiled in America	Filipe Soto	
1993	Shootfighter: Fight to the Death	Mr. C	
1993	Fist Fighter 2		
1993	Broken Trust	Peter Wyatt	
1993	The Ice Runner	Jeff West	
1994	Hard Drive	The Examiner	
1994	Guarding Tess	Barry Carlisle	
1994	The Other Man	Richard	
1994	Red Sun Rising	Decklin	
1994	Demon Keeper	Remy Grilland	
1994	Sorceress	Howard Reynolds	
1996	Space Marines	Captain Tom "Gray Wolf" Gray	
1996	The Secret Agent Club	Max Simpson	
1996	Kid Cop	Frank Rebbins	
1997	Modern Rhapsody	The Choreographer	
1998	The Face of Alexandre Dumas	Athos	a.k.a. The Man in the Iron Mask
1999	Unbowed	US Army Officer	
2000	Stage Ghost	U.S. Deputy Marshal Coburn	
2001	Ablaze	Mayor Phillips	
2001	Mimic 2	Darksuit	
2001	Night Class	Ned Shelly	a.k.a. Seduced by a Thief
2001	Extreme Honor	Senator Richards	
2003	A Light in the Forest	King Otto / Ridgewell	
2004	No Regrets	Alex Wheeler	
2004	The Work and the Glory	Martin Harris	
2006	A-List	Alfred	
2006	Sea of Fear	Captain	
2007	Fighting Words	Marc Neihauser	Posthumous release, re-released as Street Poet (2010)
2008	Chinaman's Chance: America's Other Slaves	Charles	Posthumous release
2008	Bullets & Butterflies	Harry	Short film, posthumous release

=== Television ===
Year	Title	Role	Notes
1973	Orson Welles Great Mysteries	The Young Gambler	Episode: "A Terribly Strange Bed"
1974	Killer Bees	Edward Van Bohlen	Television film
1974	Kung Fu	Johnny Kingsley McLean	Episode: "Blood of the Dragon"
1974	Death Cruise	James Radney	Television film
1975	The Rookies	Edward Milland	Episode: "Nightmare"
1975	Medical Story	Thor Halverson	Episode: "A Life in the Balance"
1976	Ellery Queen	Lee Marx	Episode: "The Adventure of Caesar's Last Sleep"
1976	Origins of the Mafia	Sebastian	Episode: "Gli antenati"
1975, 1976	Police Story	Clay Peters, Billy Bob	2 episodes
1976	Gibbsville	John	Episode: "Afternoon Waltz"
1978	Black Beauty	Lewis Barry	Miniseries
1978	The Love Boat	Doug Warren	Episode: "Heads or Tails/Mona of the Movies/The Little People"
1978	The Millionaire	Paul Mathews	Television film
1979	Silent Victory: The Kitty O'Neil Story	Tom Buchanan	Television film
1979	The Last Convertible	Ron Dalrymple	Miniseries
1981	Walking Tall	Clell Brewster	Episode: "Kidnapped"
1981	The Littlest Hobo	Joey Green	Episode: "The Hero"
1982	Today's F.B.I.	Carl	Episode: "Bank Job"
1982	Tales of the Unexpected	Sam	Episode: "In the Bag"
1983	Blood Feud	Phil Wharton	Television film
1983	The Yellow Rose	Quisto Champion	Main cast
1984	Murder, She Wrote	Tony Holiday	Episode: "Hit, Run and Homicide"
1985	Deadly Nightmares	Arthur Brown	Episode: "Man at the Window"
1986	Brothers	Tony Martin	Episode: "Still Married After All These Years"
1987	The New Mike Hammer	Oliver Alden	Episode: "Deadly Collection"
1987	Houston Knights	Lester Farnum	Episode: "North of the Border"
1986-1987	Falcon Crest	Jeff Wainwright	Recurring role (seasons 5–6)
1988	ABC Afterschool Special	Bill Watson	Episode: "Daddy Can't Read"
1987-1990	Beauty and the Beast	Elliot Burch	Recurring role
1991	Guns of Paradise	Robert Carroll	Episode: "Birthright"
1991	The Girl from Mars	Dan Puttman	Television film
1991	Midnight Caller	State Senator Joran Pearl	Episode: "The Added Starter"
1992	Body Language	Charles Stella	Television film
1992	Bodies of Evidence	Charlie Harper	Episode: "Nearest and Dearest"
1992	Civil Wars	Miles Wachtel	Episode: "Das Boat House"
1992	Silk Stalkings	Edgardo / Tio Mendoza / Felix Bustamente	Episode: "Scorpio Lover"
1993	Star Trek: Deep Space Nine	Zayra	Episode: "A Man Alone"
1993	FBI: The Untold Stories	Drew Dobson	Episode: "Dapper Drew"
1993	L.A. Law	Warren McElroy	Episode: "Hello and Goodbye"
1993	In the Heat of the Night	Lamar Sloan	Episode: "Legacy"
1993	Time Trax	Frank Haskall	Episode: "Treasure of the Ages"
1993	Dark Justice	Quin	Episode: "Incorrect Dosage"
1993	Dr. Quinn, Medicine Woman	Dr. William Burke	2 episodes
1994	Fantastic Four	Silver Surfer	Voice, episode: "Doomsday"
1994	The Other Man	Richard	Television film
1994	Fortune Hunter	Dave Jarrett	1 episode
1995	Hawkeye	Luc	1 episode
1995	Star Witness		Television film
1996	Spider-Man: The Animated Series	Daredevil / Matt Murdock	Voice, 2 episodes
1996	Walker, Texas Ranger	Taylor Griffin	Episode: "Cyclone"
1997	Profiler	Arthur DeRhodes	Episode: "Doppelganger"
1997	The Sentinel	Dan Singleton	Episode: "Disappearing Act"
1997	High Tide	Robert Janson	Episode: "Ghost Story"
1997	Extreme Ghostbusters	Sheriff	Voice, 2 episodes
1997	California	Ted McKay	Unaired television pilot
1997-1999	Port Charles	Bennett Devlin	Recurring role
1998	Mike Hammer, Private Eye	Leader of Robbers	Episode: "Gone Fishing"
1998	Invasion America	Rafe	Main voice role
1998	Sabrina the Teenage Witch	Dave "Diamond Dave" LaRouche	Episode: "You Bet Your Family"
1998	USMA West Point		Television film
1999	Nash Bridges	Charles Gandy	Episode: "Angel of Mercy"
1999	Martial Law	Deputy Chief Bain	Episode: "End Game"
1999	Chicken Soup for the Soul	Joe	Episode: "Simple Wooden Boxes"
2000	Godzilla: The Series	Briggs	Voice, episode: "Vision"
2001	Max Steel	Various Voices	3 episodes (as Edward Laurence Albert)
2001	Resurrection Blvd	Armando Lamas	Episode: "Compadres"
2001	Power Rangers Time Force	Mr. Collins	Main cast (as Edward Laurence Albert)
2002	The Brothers Garcia	Bobby Junior's Dad	Episode: "Space Race"
2003	She Spies	Beck	Episode: "Off with Her Head"
