= Eileen Heckart =

American actress (1919–2001)

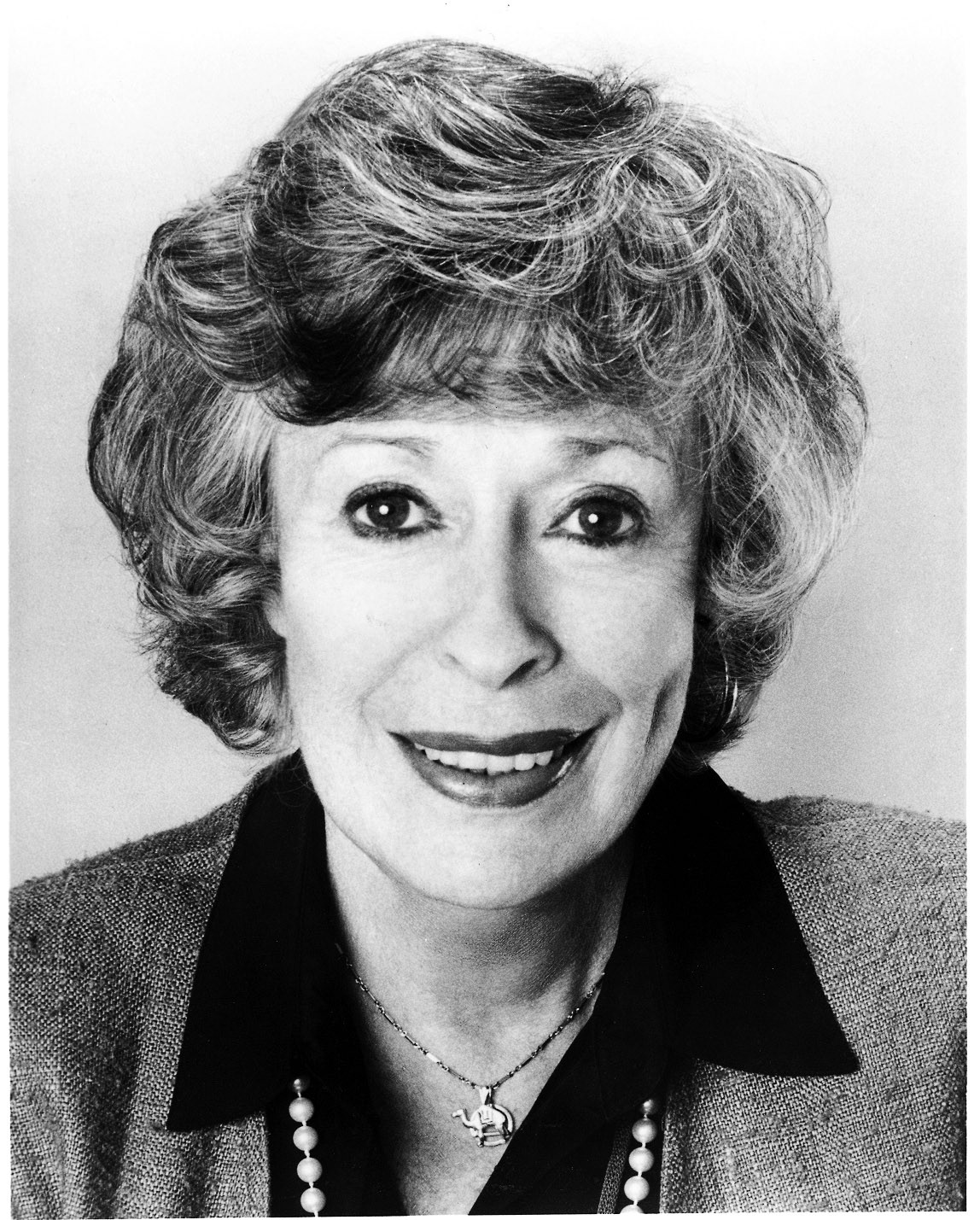
- Heckart in the 1990s
- Born: Anna Eileen Herbert; March 29, 1919; Columbus, Ohio, U.S.
- Died: December 31, 2001 (aged 82); Norwalk, Connecticut, U.S.
- Education: Ohio State University (B.A.)
- Occupation: Actress
- Years active: 1943–2001
- Spouse(s): John Harrison Yankee, Jr. (m. 1942; died 1997)
- Children: 3, including Luke Yankee

Anna Eileen Heckart (née Herbert; March 29, 1919 – December 31, 2001) was an American stage and screen actress whose career spanned nearly 60 years. Heckart won an Academy Award, a Golden Globe Award, and two Emmy Awards, as well as was nominated for three Tony Awards. In 2000, she received the Tony Honor for Excellence in Theatre.

== Early life ==
Heckart was born Anna Eileen Herbert in Columbus, Ohio. Her mother Esther (née Stark) wed Leo Herbert (not the child's father) at her own mother's insistence so her child would not be born with the stigma of illegitimacy. Eileen was soon after legally adopted by her maternal grandmother's wealthy second husband, J.W. Heckart, providing her with the surname by which she would be known throughout the remainder of her life. She had two stepsisters, Anne and Marilyn. She graduated from Ohio State University with a B.A. in drama. She additionally studied drama at HB Studio in New York City.

== Career ==
=== Stage ===
Heckart acted with the Blackfriars Guild and studied for four years at the American Theatre Wing.

Heckart began her Broadway career as the assistant stage manager and an understudy for The Voice of the Turtle in 1943. Her many credits include Picnic, The Bad Seed, A View from the Bridge, A Memory of Two Mondays, The Dark at the Top of the Stairs, A Family Affair, And Things That Go Bump in the Night, Barefoot in the Park, Butterflies Are Free, You Know I Can't Hear You When the Water's Running, and The Cemetery Club.

Heckart won the 1953 Theatre World Award for Picnic. Her nominations include Tony Award nominations for Butterflies Are Free, Invitation to a March, and The Dark at the Top of the Stairs.

In 2000, at age 81, she appeared off-Broadway in Kenneth Lonergan's The Waverly Gallery. For this performance, she won several awards, including the Drama Desk Award, the Lucille Lortel Award, the Drama League Award and the Outer Critics Circle Award. That same year, she was inducted into the American Theatre Hall of Fame and received an honorary Tony Award for lifetime achievement.

She was granted three honorary doctorates by Sacred Heart University, Niagara University, and Ohio State University.

=== Film and television ===
Heckart's television debut came in the mid-1940s when she had two lines in an episode of Suspense.

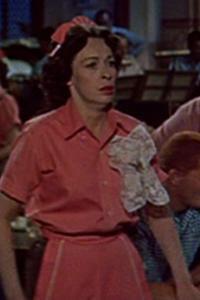
Heckart in 1956's Bus Stop

Heckart won the Academy Award for Best Supporting Actress for her work in the 1972 movie adaptation of Butterflies Are Free and was nominated in 1957 for her performance as the bereaved, besotted Mrs. Daigle in The Bad Seed (1956), both of which were roles Heckart originated on Broadway. Heckart appeared in The Hiding Place (1976) as nurse, "Katje", working inside "Kamp Vught", the Dutch Concentration Camp. In 1977, Heckart played Bertha Hayden, mother of Sam Hayden in NBC's made for TV Christmas movie, "Sunshine Christmas". 1n 1978, Heckart appeared in the Resorts International Atlantic City New Jersey Christmas production, "Jackie Gleason Presents The Honeymooners", as Alice's mother, Mrs Gibson. She later appeared as a Vietnam War widow in the Clint Eastwood film Heartbreak Ridge (1986). She played Diane Keaton's meddling mother in the 1996 comedy film The First Wives Club.

On television, Heckart had starring roles in The 5 Mrs. Buchanans, Out of the Blue, Partners in Crime, and Backstairs at the White House (Emmy nomination as Eleanor Roosevelt). In 1994, she won an Emmy Award for Outstanding Guest Actress in a Comedy Series for her appearance as Rose Stein on Love & War. In 1988, she appeared as Ruth in the Tales from the Darkside episode "Do Not Open This Box". Her other guest roles included The Fugitive (where she appeared in three episodes as a nun, "Sister Veronica"), The Mary Tyler Moore Show (two Emmy nominations as journalist Flo Meredith, a role she carried over to a guest appearance on MTM's spinoff Lou Grant), Love Story, Rhoda, Alice, Murder One, Hawaii Five-O, Gunsmoke, Cybill, The Cosby Show (one Emmy nomination as Mrs. Hickson), and many others.

She appeared on two episodes of Gunsmoke. In 1965, Heckart appeared as Hattie Silks on the episode "The Lady." In 1969, Heckart appeared as Athena Partridge Royce on the episode "The Innocent".

Heckart played two unrelated characters on the daytime soap opera One Life to Live. During the 1980s, she played Ruth Perkins, the mother of Allison Perkins, who had kidnapped the newborn baby of heroine Viki Lord Buchanan under orders from phony evangelist and mastermind criminal Mitch Laurence. During the early 1990s, she played the role of Wilma Bern, mother of upstate Pennsylvania mob boss Carlo Hesser and his meek twin, Mortimer Bern. She appeared in the 1954 legal drama Justice, based on case files of New York's Legal Aid Society. She appeared in an episode of the medical drama The Eleventh Hour, titled "There Should Be an Outfit Called 'Families Anonymous!'" (1963), and an episode of Home Improvement, titled "Losing My Religion". She also played the role of spinster Amanda Cooper on season 5 episode 17 in the Little House on the Prairie episode "Dance With Me".

Heckart has a star on the Hollywood Walk of Fame at 6140 Hollywood Blvd.

== Personal life and death ==
In 1942, Heckart married insurance broker John Harrison Yankee Jr., her college sweetheart. They had three sons. Her son Luke Yankee is the author of her 2006 biography Just Outside the Spotlight: Growing Up with Eileen Heckart. In February 2024, Luke Yankee's play Marilyn, Mom, and Me debuted at the International City Theater.

Heckart was a Democrat. She met President Lyndon B. Johnson at the White House in 1967.

On December 31, 2001, Heckart died of lung cancer at her home in Norwalk, Connecticut, at the age of 82. She was cremated with her ashes scattered outside the Music Box Theatre in Manhattan, New York.

== Filmography ==
| Year | Title | Role |
|---|---|---|
| 1956 | Miracle in the Rain | Grace Ullman |
| 1956 | Somebody Up There Likes Me | Ma Barbella |
| 1956 | Bus Stop | Vera |
| 1956 | The Bad Seed | Hortense Daigle |
| 1958 | Hot Spell | Alma's Friend |
| 1960 | Heller in Pink Tights | Mrs. Lorna Hathaway |
| 1963 | My Six Loves | Ethel |
| 1967 | Up the Down Staircase | Henrietta Pastorfield |
| 1968 | No Way to Treat a Lady | Mrs. Brummel |
| 1969 | The Tree | Sally Dunning |
| 1972 | Butterflies Are Free | Mrs. Florence Baker |
| 1974 | Zandy's Bride | Ma Allan |
| 1975 | The Hiding Place | Katje |
| 1976 | Burnt Offerings | Roz Allardyce |
| 1983 | Trauma Center | Amy Decker R.N. |
| 1986 | Seize the Day | Funeral Woman No. 1 |
| 1986 | Heartbreak Ridge | Little Mary Jackson |
| 1994 | The 5 Mrs. Buchanans | Emma Buchanan |
| 1994 | Ultimate Betrayal | Sarah McNeil |
| 1996 | The First Wives Club | Catherine MacDuggan |

== Selected television appearances ==
- Goodyear Television Playhouse (1955) ("My Lost Saints") as housekeeper
- Alfred Hitchcock Presents (1961) (Season 6 Episode 26: "Coming, Mama") as Lucy Baldwin
- Hawaii Five-O (1975) (Season 8 Episode 12: "Honor is an Unmarked Grave") as Agatha Henderson
- Sunshine Christmas (NBC, December 12, 1977) as "Bertha Hayden", Sam Hayden's mother
- Jackie Gleason's Honeymooner's Christmas (December 10, 1978) as "Mrs. Gibson", Alice's mother
- Out of the Blue (1979) (12 episodes) as The Boss Angel
- Little House on the Prairie (1979) (Season 5 Episode 17: Dance with Me") as Amanda Cooper

Highway to Heaven (1985) Helen Season 1

== Awards and nominations ==
| Association | Year | Category | Work | Result | Ref(s) |
|---|---|---|---|---|---|
| Academy Awards | 1957 | Best Supporting Actress | The Bad Seed | Nominated | |
| Academy Awards | 1973 | Best Supporting Actress | Butterflies Are Free | Won | |
| Daytime Emmy Awards | 1987 | Outstanding Guest Performer in a Drama Series | One Life to Live | Nominated | |
| Drama Desk Awards | 1996 | Outstanding Featured Actress in a Play | Northeast Local | Nominated | |
| Drama Desk Awards | 2000 | Outstanding Actress in a Play | The Waverly Gallery | Won | |
| Drama League Awards | 2000 | Distinguished Performance | The Waverly Gallery | Won | |
| Golden Globe Awards | 1957 | Best Supporting Actress | The Bad Seed | Won | |
| National Board of Review Awards | 1997 | Best Acting by an Ensemble | The First Wives Club | Won | |
| Outer Critics Circle Awards | 2000 | Outstanding Actress in a Play | The Waverly Gallery | Won | |
| Primetime Emmy Awards | 1975 | Outstanding Supporting Actress in a Limited Series or Movie | Wedding Band | Nominated | |
| Primetime Emmy Awards | 1976 | Outstanding Guest Actress in a Comedy Series | The Mary Tyler Moore Show | Nominated | |
| Primetime Emmy Awards | 1977 | Outstanding Guest Actress in a Comedy Series | The Mary Tyler Moore Show | Nominated | |
| Primetime Emmy Awards | 1979 | Outstanding Supporting Actress in a Limited Series or Movie | Backstairs at the White House | Nominated | |
| Primetime Emmy Awards | 1980 | Outstanding Supporting Actress in a Limited Series or Movie | F.D.R.: The Last Year | Nominated | |
| Primetime Emmy Awards | 1988 | Outstanding Guest Actress in a Comedy Series | The Cosby Show | Nominated | |
| Primetime Emmy Awards | 1994 | Outstanding Guest Actress in a Comedy Series | Love & War | Won | |
| New York Emmy Awards | 1966 | Individuals | New York Television Theatre (episode "Save Me A Place At Forest Lawn") | Won | |
| Theatre World Award | 1953 | Theatre World Award | Picnic | Won | |
| Tony Awards | 1958 | Best Supporting or Featured Actress in a Play | The Dark at the Top of the Stairs | Nominated | |
| Tony Awards | 1961 | Best Supporting or Featured Actress in a Play | Invitation to a March | Nominated | |
| Tony Awards | 1970 | Best Supporting or Featured Actress in a Play | Butterflies Are Free | Nominated | |
| Tony Awards | 2000 | Tony Honor for Excellence in Theatre | —N/a | Won | |
