= Michael Shurtleff =

American dramatist

Michael Shurtleff (July 3, 1920, in Oak Park, Illinois – January 28, 2007, in Los Angeles, California) was a major force in casting on Broadway during the 1960s and 1970s. He wrote Audition, a book for actors on the audition process. He also wrote numerous one-act and full-length plays.

== Early life ==
Charles Gordon Shurtleff was born in Oak Park, Illinois and attended Lawrence University in Appleton, Wisconsin and the Yale School of Drama, where he received his MFA in playwriting in 1952. He moved to New York City after graduation and changed his first name to Michael. He has two brothers, John and Roger.

== Career ==
Shurtleff was the major casting director for producer David Merrick. During the casting process he would bring in to audition for the play's director such new names as Elliott Gould, Barbra Streisand, Gene Hackman, Dustin Hoffman, Bette Midler and Jerry Orbach. Shurtleff worked with Bob Fosse on Pippin and Chicago, and Andrew Lloyd Webber on Jesus Christ Superstar.

Shurtleff went on to form his own casting service, Casting Consultants, in 1962. Among the Broadway productions on which he acted as casting director were the original productions of 1776, The Apple Tree and Chicago. He served as casting director on such films as The Graduate and The Sound of Music. In his book Audition, he addressed common problems for actors during the audition process, problems he had witnessed many times over in his casting sessions. The book has become somewhat of a "bible for aspiring actors."

Shurtleff wrote the play Call Me By My Rightful Name. He had plays published in The Best Short Plays Series, of which the 1979 edition includes his popular "Sailing."

== Death ==
Shurtleff died of lung cancer, aged 86, at his home in Los Angeles, California.
