= Leonard Gershe =

American playwright, screenwriter, and lyricist (1922–2002)

- Born: June 10, 1922; New York City, New York, U.S.
- Died: March 9, 2002 (aged 79); Beverly Hills, California, U.S.
- Occupations: Screenwriter, playwright, lyricist

Leonard Gershe (June 10, 1922 – March 9, 2002) was an American playwright, screenwriter, and lyricist.

Born in New York City, Gershe made his Broadway debut as a lyricist for the 1950 revue Alive and Kicking. He wrote the book for Harold Rome's musical stage adaptation of Destry Rides Again in 1959 and the play Butterflies Are Free in 1969. Later Gershe wrote the play Snacks for Tony Danza.

He wrote the lyrics for the "Born in a Trunk" sequence from the Judy Garland/James Mason musical A Star Is Born. In the 1950s, Gershe wrote 10 scripts for the Ann Sothern sitcom Private Secretary. He also wrote a number of episodes of The Lucy Show. His screen credits include Funny Face, 40 Carats, and Butterflies Are Free.

According to World of Wonder website writer Stephen Rutledge, Gershe had a long-term relationship with Hollywood composer, arranger, and associate producer Roger Edens.

Gershe died in Beverly Hills, California from complications from a stroke. He was 79 and was buried at the Westwood Memorial Park in Los Angeles.

== Nominations ==
- 1958 Academy Award for Best Writing, Story and Screenplay, Written Directly for the Screen (Funny Face)
- 1958 Writers Guild of America Award for Best American Musical (Funny Face)
- 1973 Writers Guild of America Award for Best Comedy Adapted from Another Medium (Butterflies Are Free)
- 1974 Writers Guild of America Award for Best Comedy Adapted from Another Medium (40 Carats)
