= Academy Award for Best Cinematography =

American film award

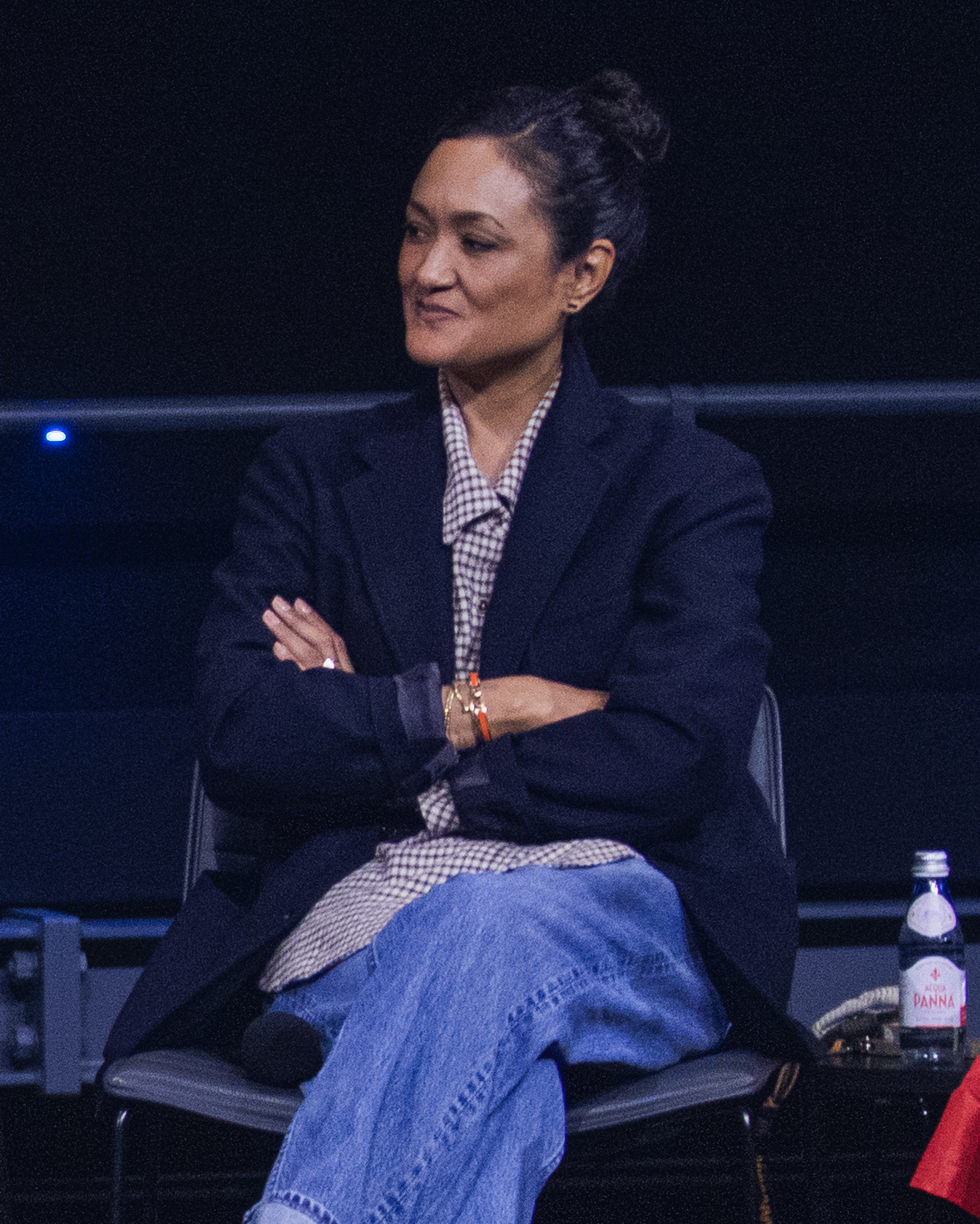
- The 2025 recipient: Autumn Durald Arkapaw
- Country: United States
- Presented by: Academy of Motion Picture Arts and Sciences (AMPAS)
- First award: May 16, 1929; 97 years ago (for films released during the 1927/1928 film season)
- Most recent winner: Autumn Durald Arkapaw; Sinners (2025)
- Website: oscars.org

The Academy Award for Best Cinematography is an Academy Award awarded each year to a cinematographer for work on one particular motion picture.

== History ==
Charles Rosher, the first recipient in 1928

In its first film season, 1927–28, this award (like others such as the acting awards) was not tied to a specific film; all of the work by the nominated cinematographers during the qualifying period was listed after their names. The problem with this system became obvious the first year, since Karl Struss and Charles Rosher were nominated for their work together on Sunrise. Still, three other films shot individually by either Rosher or Struss were also listed as part of the nomination. In the second year, 1929, there were no nominations at all, although the Academy has a list of unofficial titles that were under consideration by the Board of Judges. In the third year, 1930, films, not cinematographers, were nominated, and the final award did not show the cinematographer's name.

Finally, for the 1931 awards, the modern system in which individuals are nominated for a single film was adopted in all profession-related categories. From 1939 to 1966 with the exception of 1957, there were also separate awards for color and black-and-white cinematography. After Who's Afraid of Virginia Woolf? (1966), the most recent black-and-white films to win since then are Schindler's List (1993), Roma (2018) and Mank (2020).

Floyd Crosby won the award for Tabu in 1931, which was the last silent film to win in this category. Hal Mohr won the only write-in Academy Award ever, in 1935 for A Midsummer Night's Dream. Mohr was also the first person to win for both black-and-white and color cinematography.

No winners are lost films, although some of the earliest nominees (and of the unofficial nominees of 1928–29) are lost, including The Devil Dancer (1927), The Magic Flame (1927), and 4 Devils (1928). The Right to Love (1930) is incomplete, and Sadie Thompson (1927) is incomplete and partially reconstructed with stills.

David Lean holds the record for the director with the most films that won the Academy Award for Best Cinematography at the Oscars with five wins out of six nominations for Great Expectations, The Bridge on the River Kwai, Lawrence of Arabia, Doctor Zhivago, and Ryan's Daughter.

The first nominees shot primarily on digital video were The Curious Case of Benjamin Button and Slumdog Millionaire in 2009, with Slumdog Millionaire being the first winner. The following year, Avatar was the first nominee and winner to be shot entirely on digital video.

In January 2017, Bradford Young became the first African-American cinematographer to be nominated for an Academy Award, for his work on Arrival.

In 2018, Rachel Morrison became the first woman to receive a nomination. Prior to that, it had been the last non-acting Academy Award category to never nominate a woman.

In 2019, Alfonso Cuarón became the first winner of this category to have also served as director on the film, for Roma. This followed a public dispute between Cuarón and the Academy over the Academy's plan to shorten the Oscars broadcast by relegating four awards, including cinematography, to the commercial breaks in the show. Cuarón objected by saying, "In the history of cinema, masterpieces have existed without sound, without color, without a story, without actors and without music. No single film has ever existed without cinematography ..."

In 2026, Autumn Durald Arkapaw became the first woman, and first woman of color, to win this category.

== Superlatives ==
Category	Name	Superlative	Year	Notes
Most awards	Leon Shamroy	4 awards	1942	Awards resulted from 18 nominations.
Most awards	Joseph Ruttenberg	4 awards	1958	Awards resulted from 10 nominations.
Most nominations	Leon Shamroy	18 nominations	1965	Nominations resulted in 4 awards.
Most nominations	Charles Lang	18 nominations	1972	Nominations resulted in 1 award.
Most consecutive awards	Emmanuel Lubezki	3 consecutive awards	2013, 2014, 2015	Awards resulted from 8 nominations.
Oldest winner	Conrad L. Hall	Age 76	2002	Hall died just two months before the awards ceremony. Hall is also the oldest non-posthumous winner, at age 73, in 1999.
Oldest nominee	Asakazu Nakai	Age 84	1985	Nakai shared the nomination with two others.
Youngest winner	Floyd Crosby	Age 31	1930/1931	
Youngest nominee	Edward Cronjager	Age 27	1930/1931	
Most nominations without an award	George Folsey	13 nominations	1963	
First female nominee	Rachel Morrison		2017	
First female winner	Autumn Durald Arkapaw		2025	Durald Arkapaw was also the first woman of color to be nominated.
First nominee/winner who also directed the film	Alfonso Cuarón	Cuarón served as director and director of photography for Roma.	2018	

== Winners and nominees ==
Winners are listed first in colored row, followed by the other nominees.

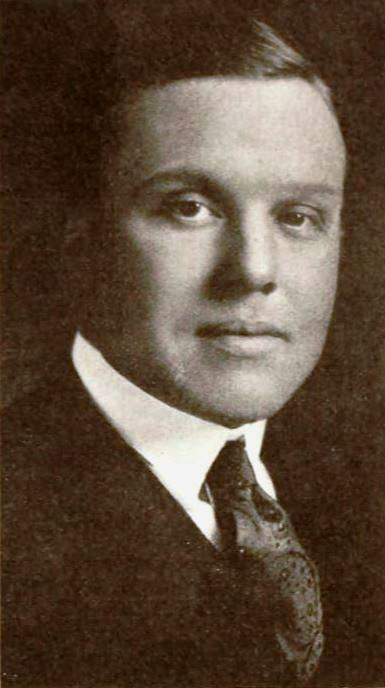
Charles Rosher was the inaugural co-winner of this category, winning the award twice, first for Sunrise: A Song of Two Humans (1927) alongside Karl Struss and his second for The Yearling (1946) alongside Leonard Smith and Arthur Arling.

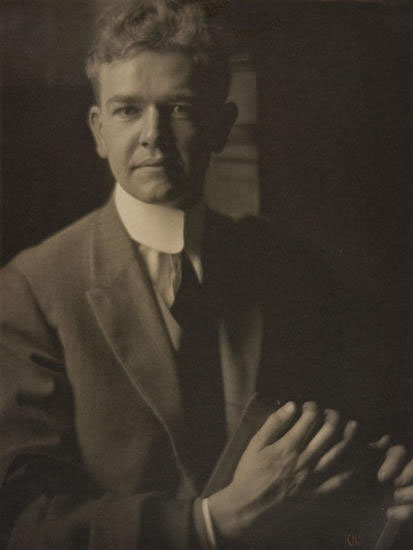
Karl Struss was the inaugural co-winner of this category, winning alongside Charles Rosher for Sunrise: A Song of Two Humans (1927).

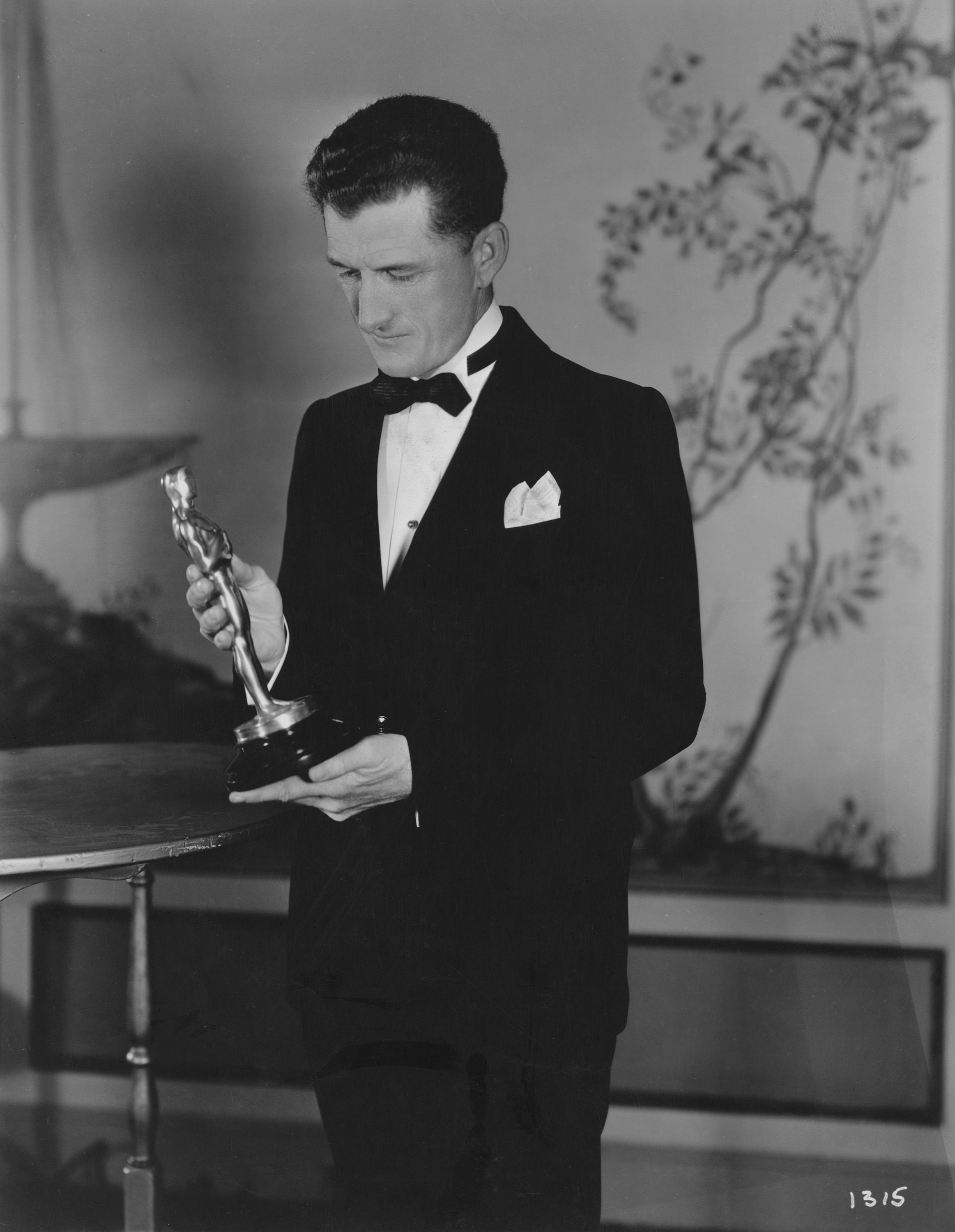
Clyde De Vinna won for White Shadows in the South Seas (1928).

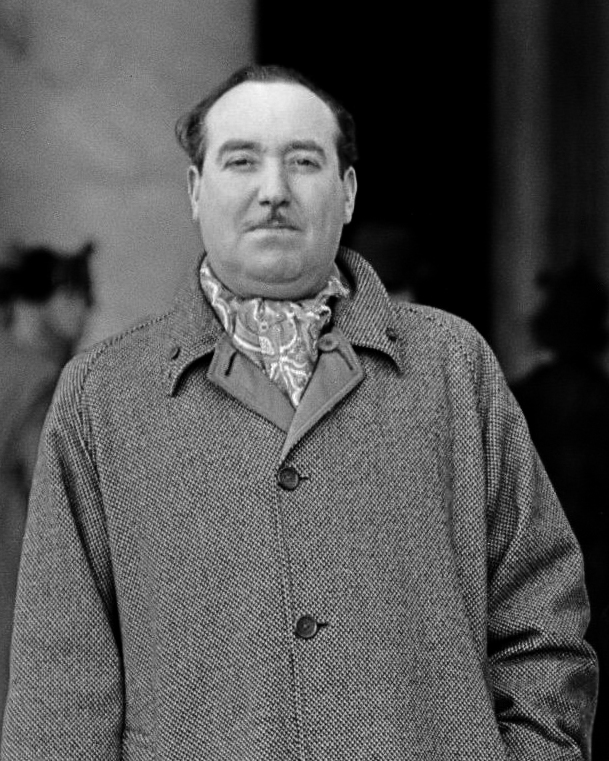
Lee Garmes won for Shanghai Express (1932).

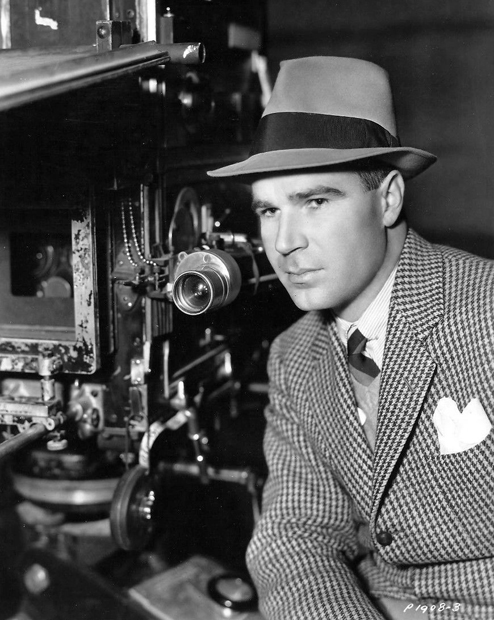
Charles Lang is tied for the most nominations for this category with 18 nominations, winning once for A Farewell to Arms (1932).

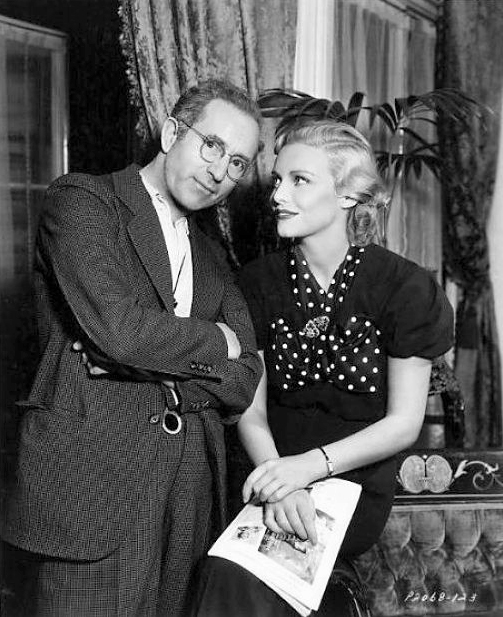
Victor Milner won for Cleopatra (1934).

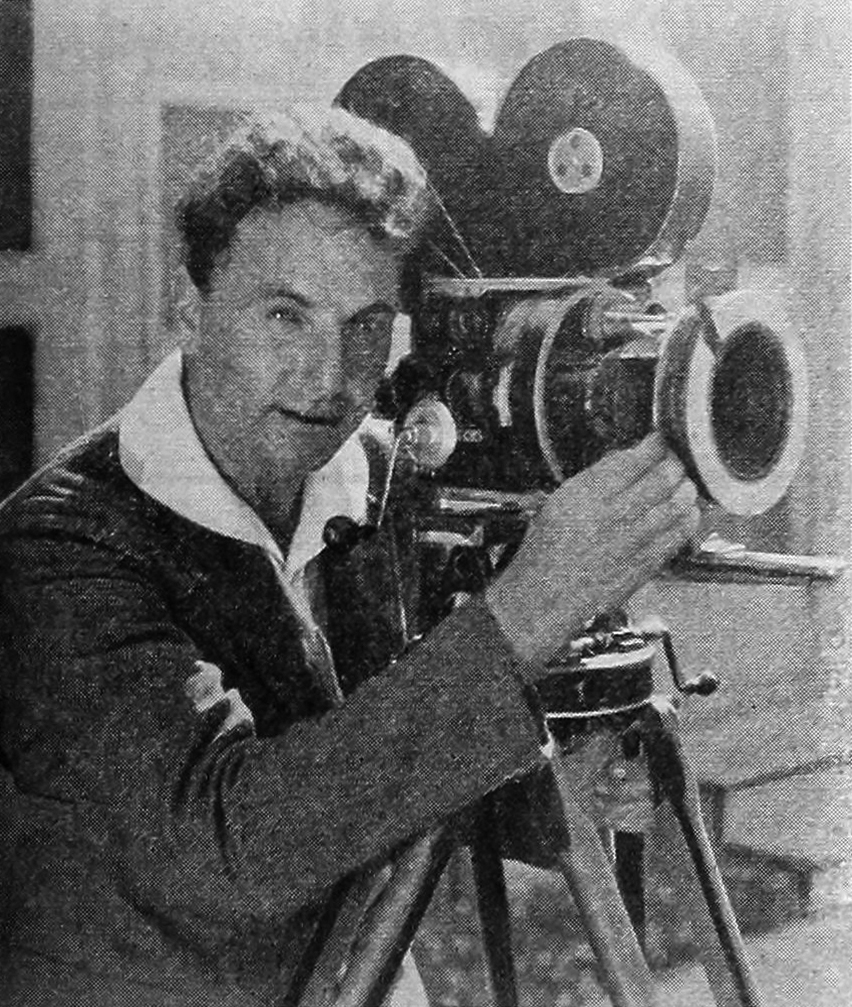
Hal Mohr won twice for A Midsummer Night's Dream (1935) along with co-winning with W. Howard Greene for Phantom of the Opera (1943).

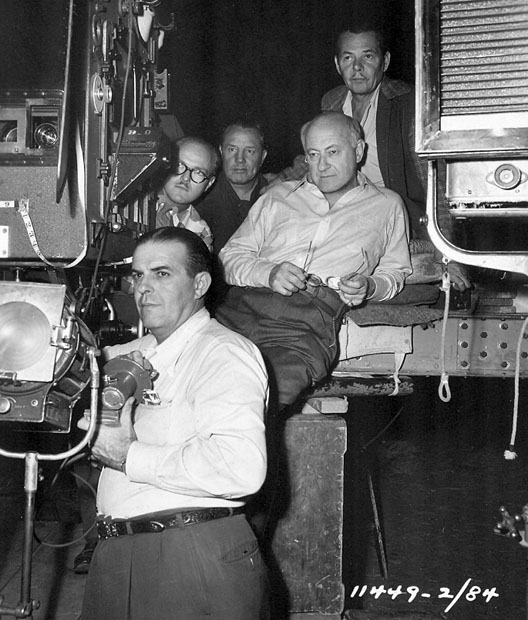
George Barnes won for Rebecca (1940).

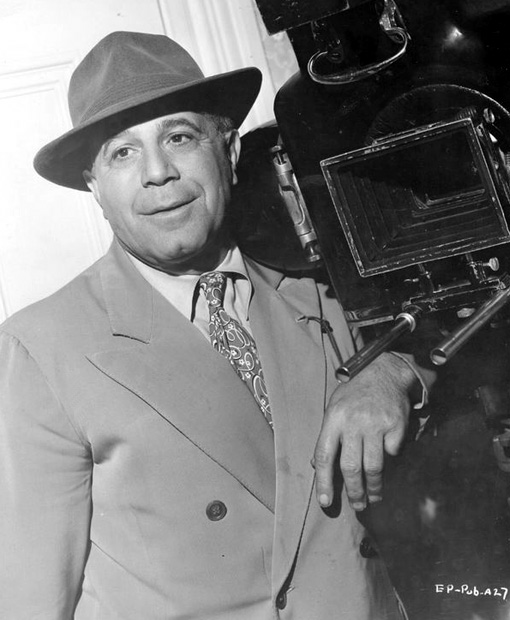
Tony Gaudio won for Anthony Adverse (1936), becoming the first ever Italian to win an Oscar.

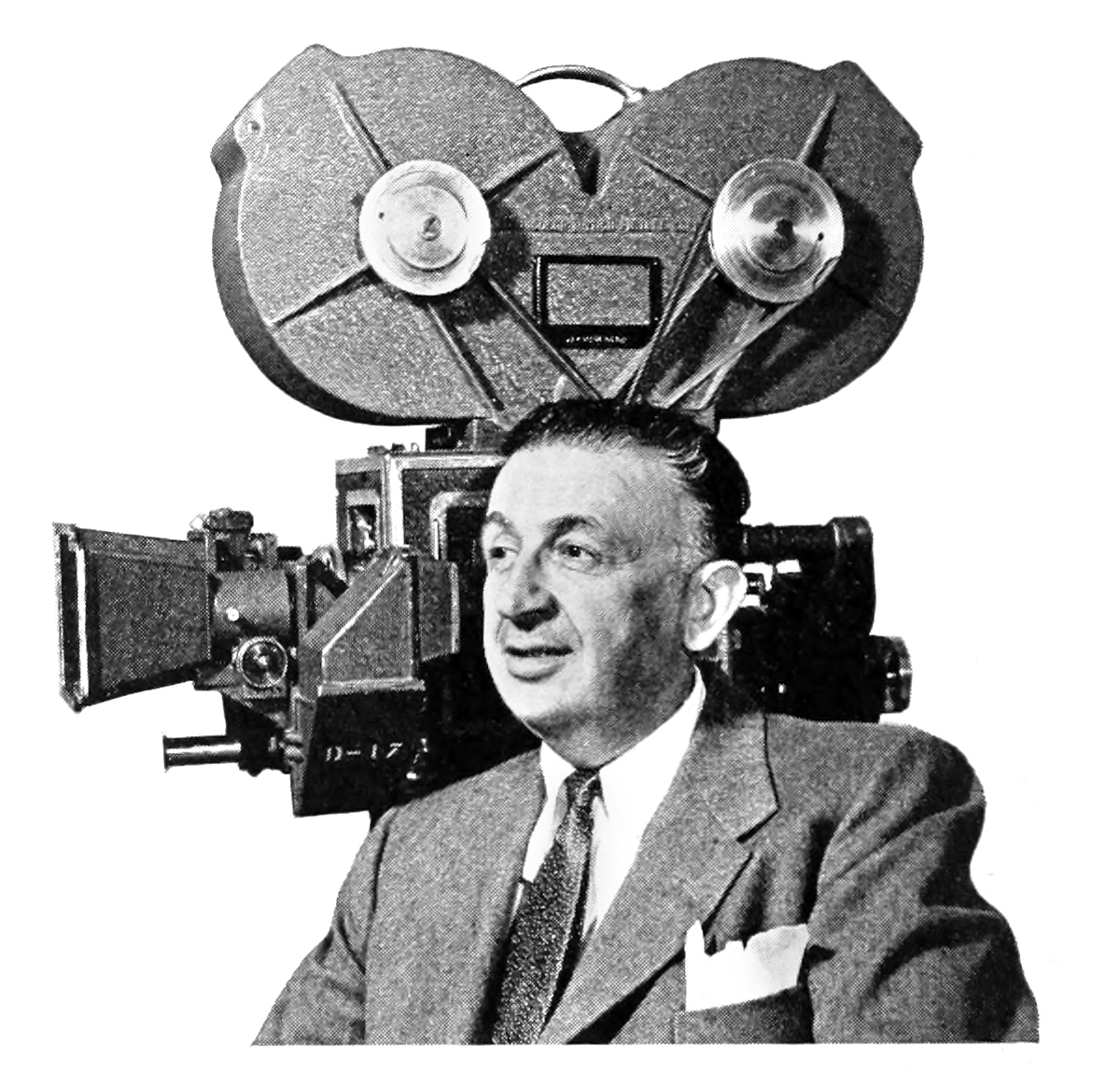
W. Howard Greene won alongside Hal Mohr for Phantom of the Opera (1943).

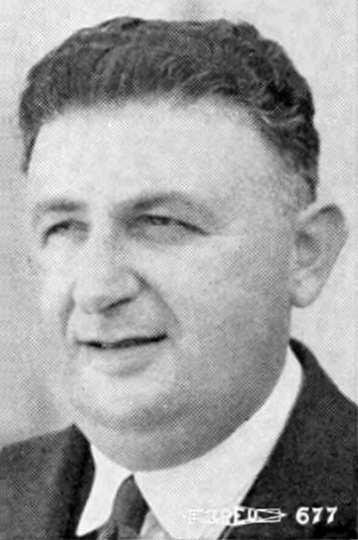
Karl Freund won for The Good Earth (1937).

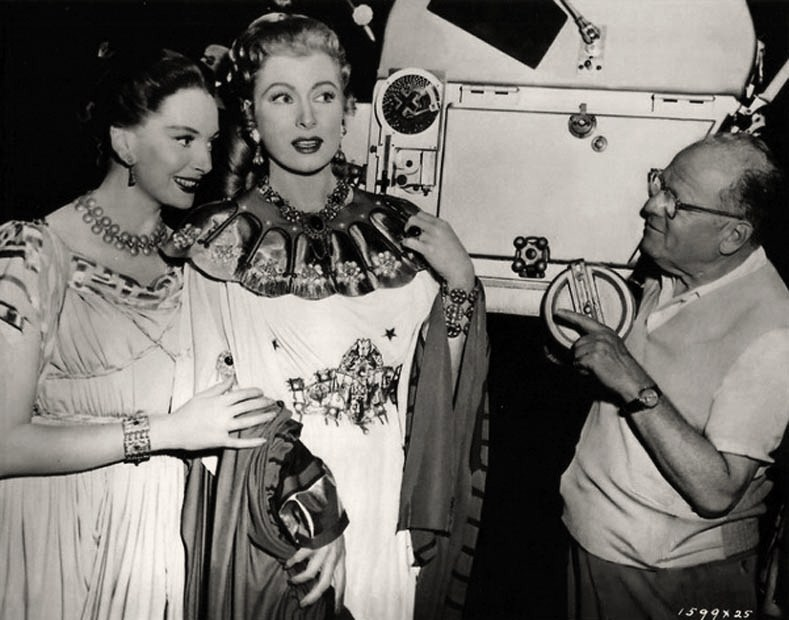
Joseph Ruttenberg (right) holds the tied record for the most wins in the category, winning four times for The Great Waltz (1938), Mrs. Miniver (1942), Somebody Up There Likes Me (1956), Gigi (1958).

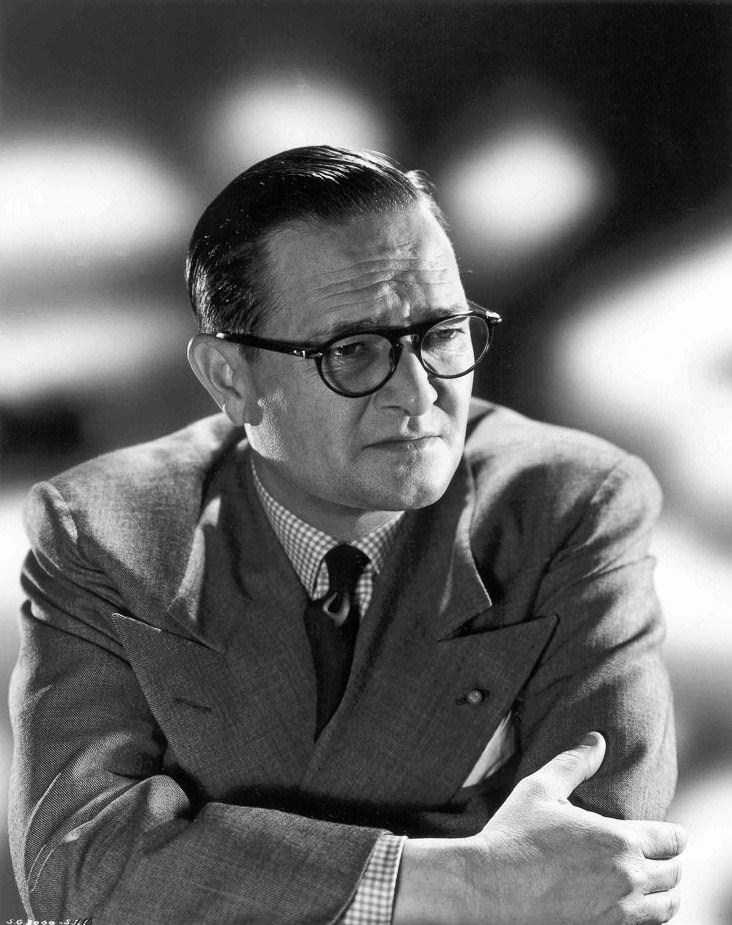
Gregg Toland won once amongst 6 nominations for Wuthering Heights (1939).

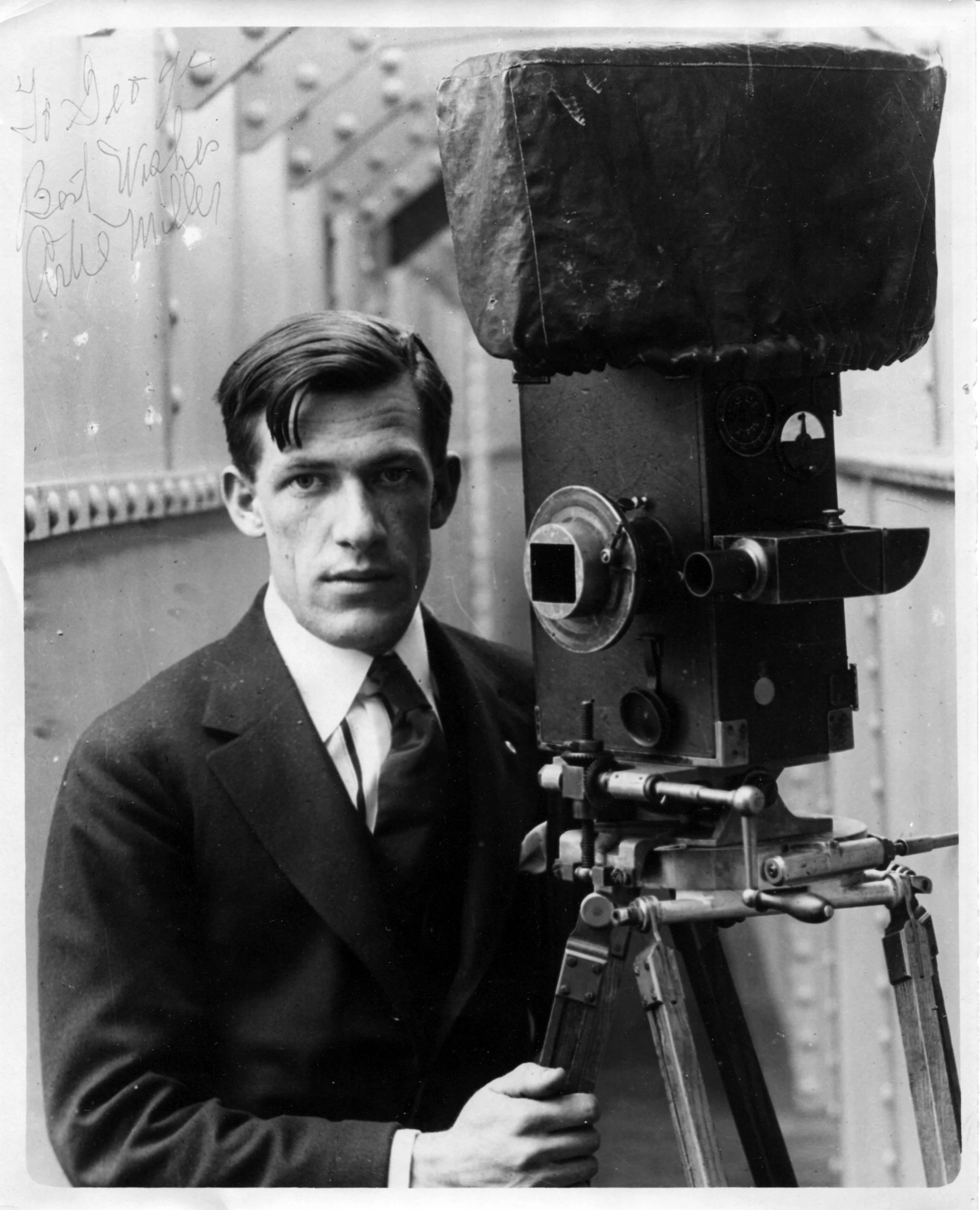
Arthur C. Miller won three times amongst 7 nominations for How Green Was My Valley (1941), The Song of Bernadette (1943) and Anna and the King of Siam (1946).

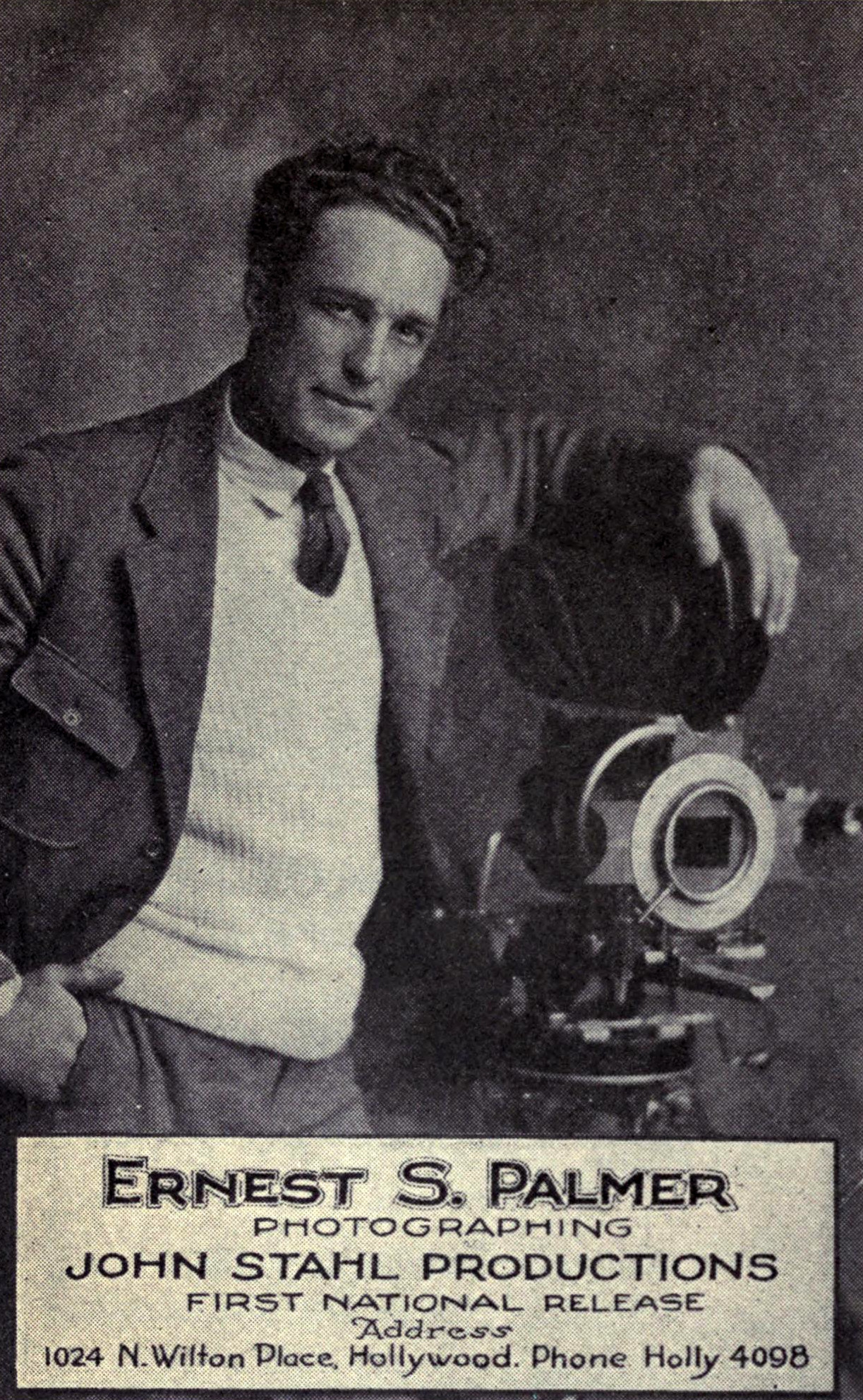
Ernest Palmer won alongside Ray Rennahan for Blood and Sand (1941).

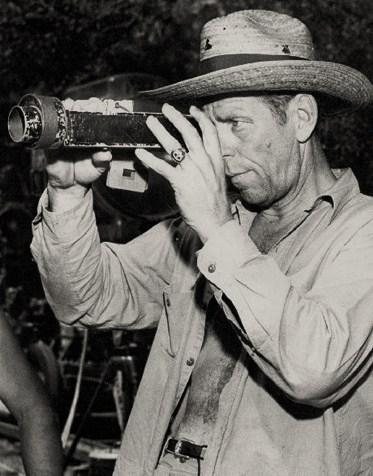
Leonard Smith co-won for The Yearling. (1946) alongside Arthur Arling and Charles Rosher.

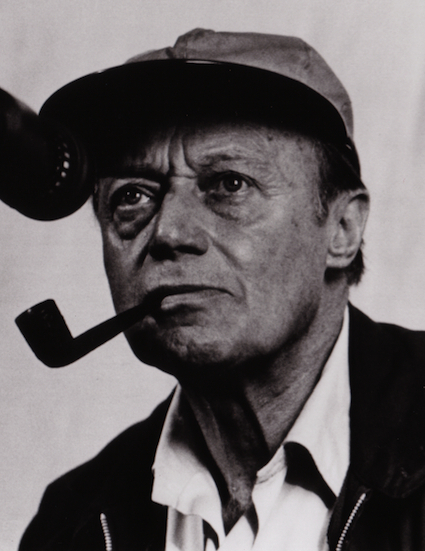
Jack Cardiff won for Black Narcissus (1947).

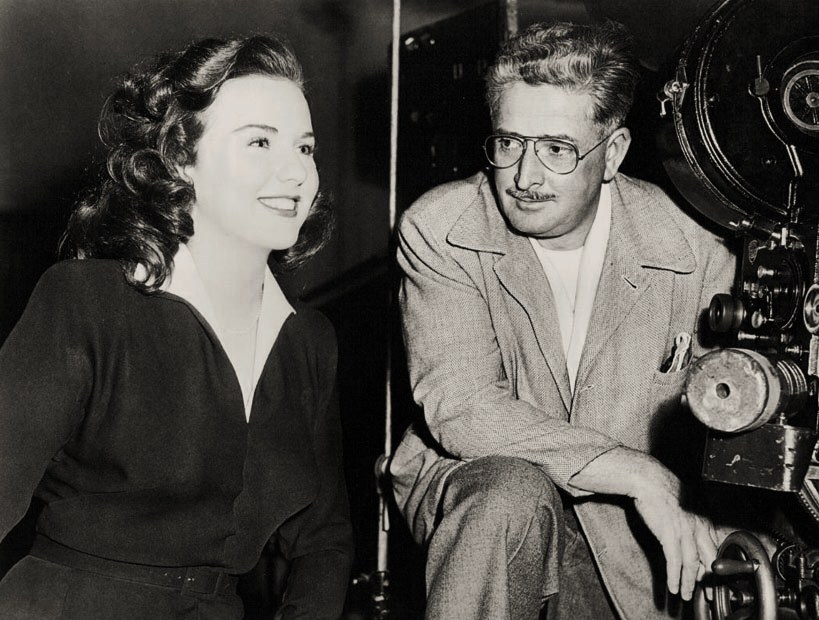
William Daniels won for The Naked City (1948).

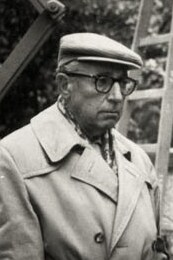
Paul C. Vogel won for Battleground (1949).

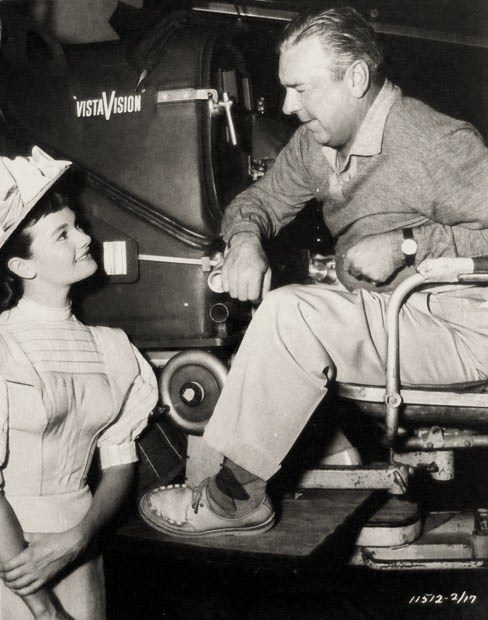
Loyal Griggs won for Shane (1953).

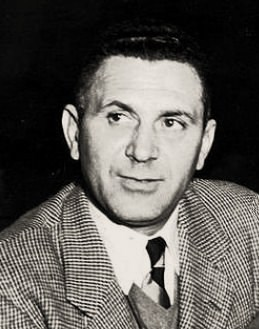
Milton Krasner won for Three Coins in the Fountain (1954).

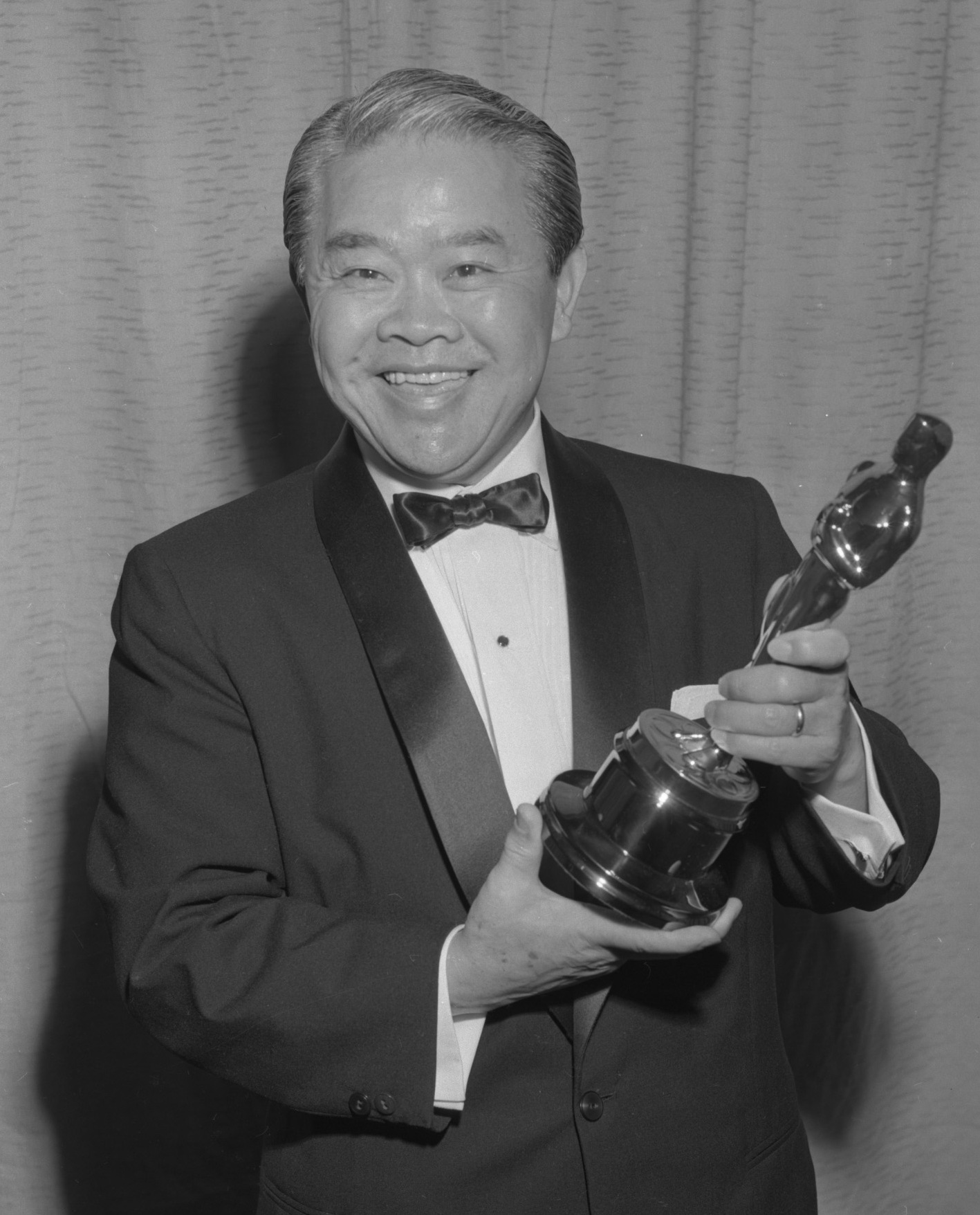
James Wong Howe won twice amongst 10 nominations for The Rose Tattoo (1955), and Hud (1963).

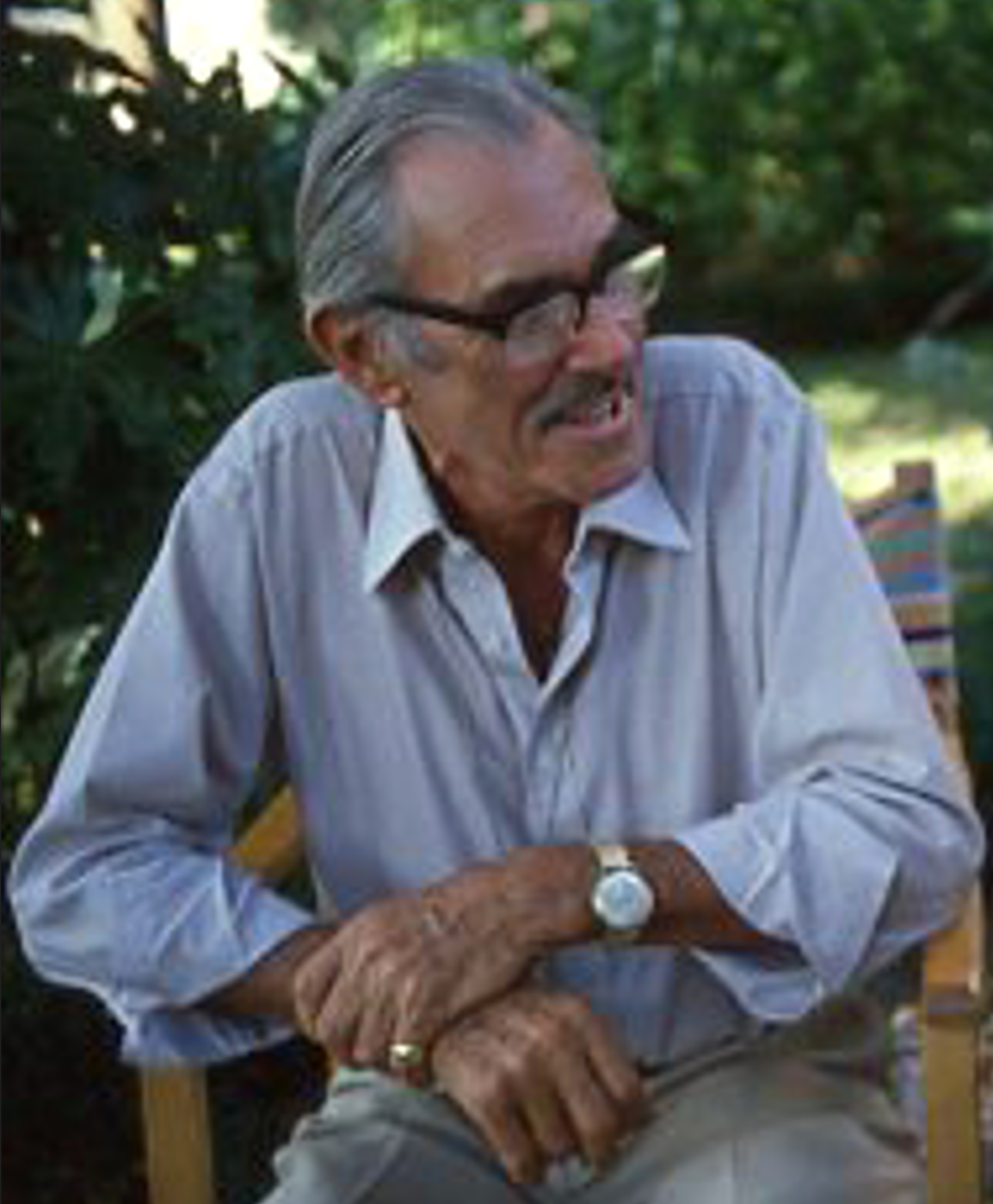
Jack Hildyard won for The Bridge on the River Kwai (1953).

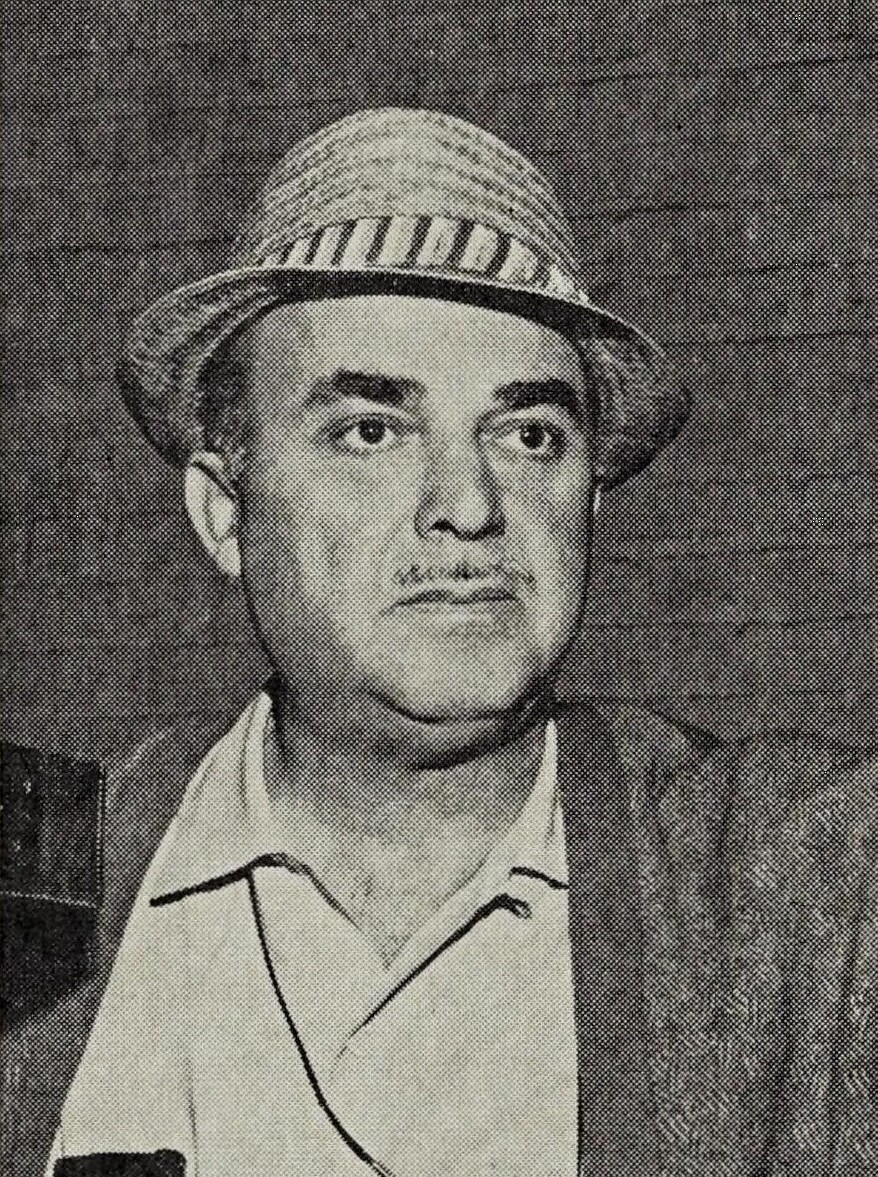
Sam Leavitt won for The Defiant Ones (1958).

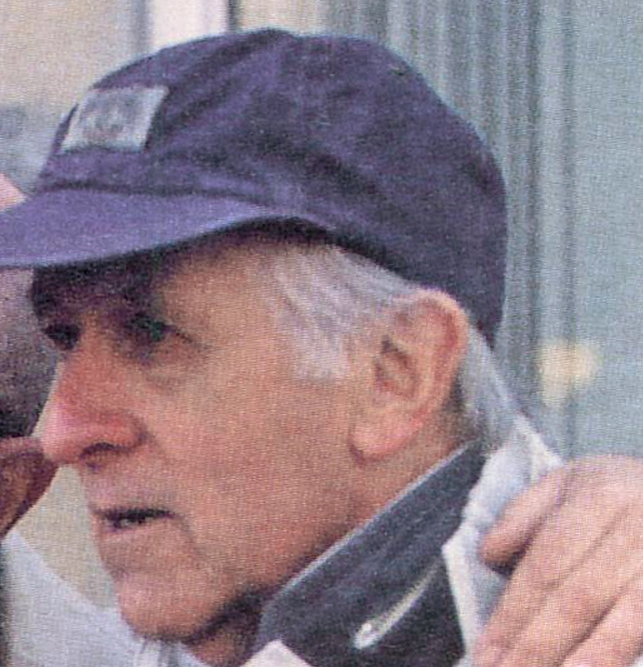
Freddie Francis won twice for Sons and Lovers (1960) and Glory (1989).

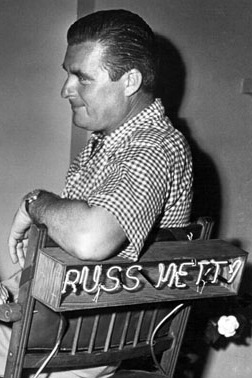
Russell Metty won for Spartacus (1960).

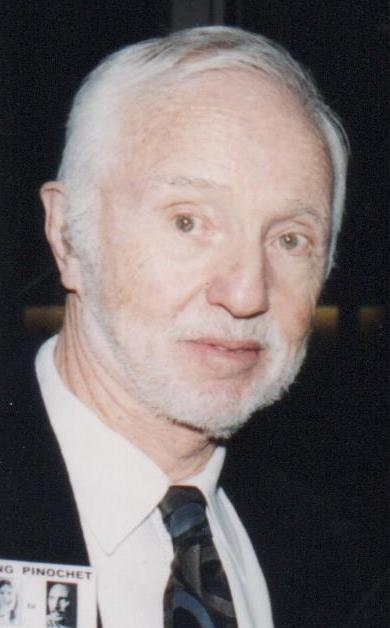
Haskell Wexler won twice amongst 5 nominations for Who's Afraid of Virginia Woolf? (1966) and Bound for Glory (1976).

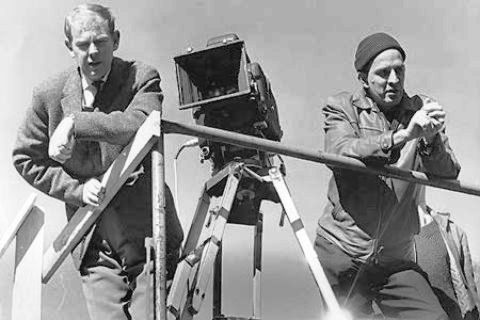
Sven Nykvist (left) won twice for Cries and Whispers (1972) and Fanny and Alexander (1982).

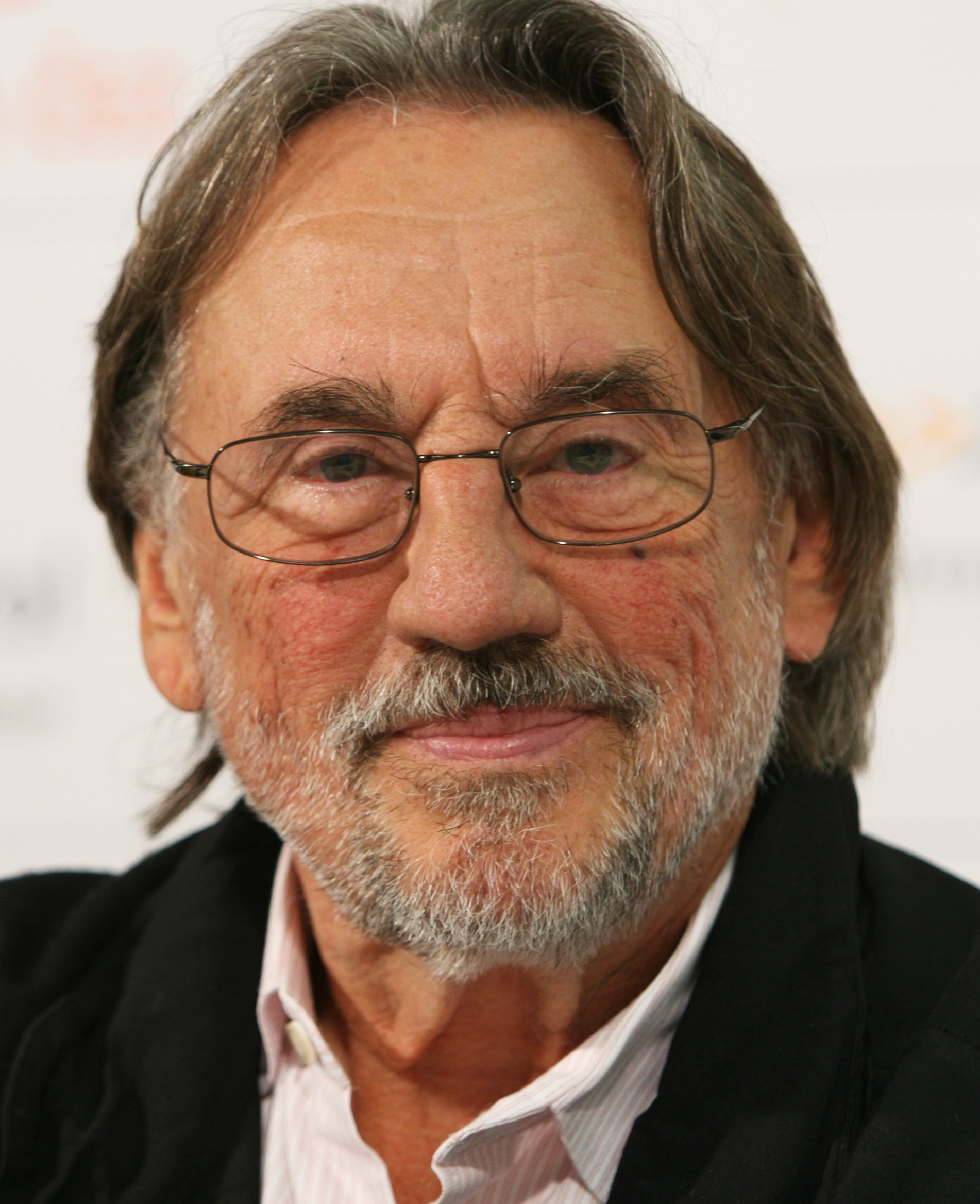
Vilmos Zsigmond won for Close Encounters of the Third Kind (1977).

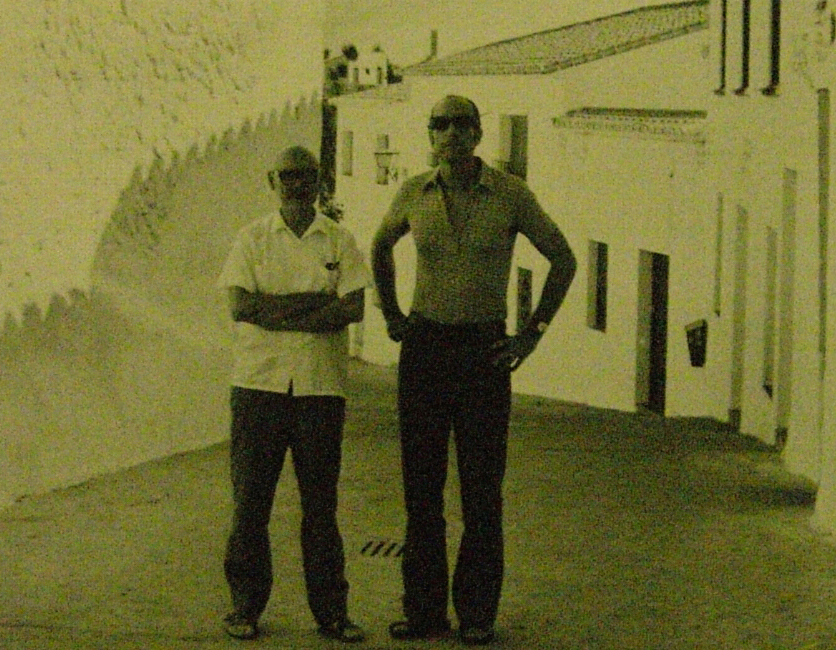
Néstor Almendros won for Days of Heaven (1978).

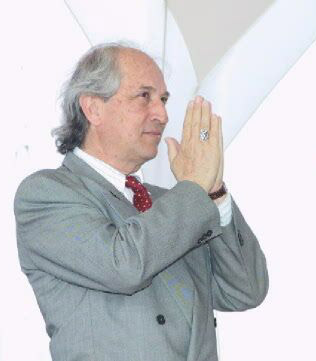
Vittorio Storaro won the award thrice, winning for Apocalypse Now (1979), Reds (1981) and The Last Emperor (1987).

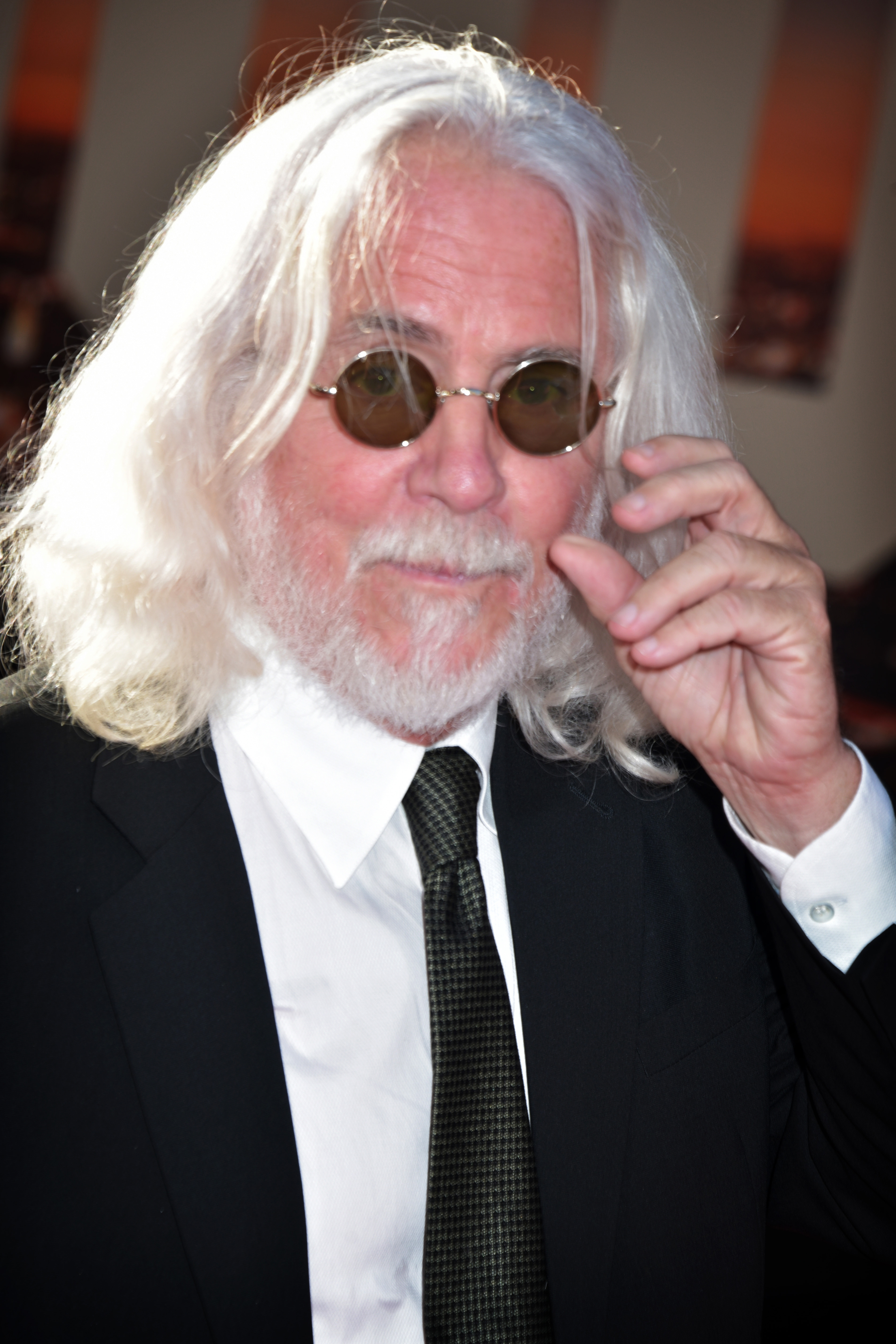
Robert Richardson won thrice amongst 10 nominations, winning for JFK (1991), The Aviator (2004) and Hugo (2011).

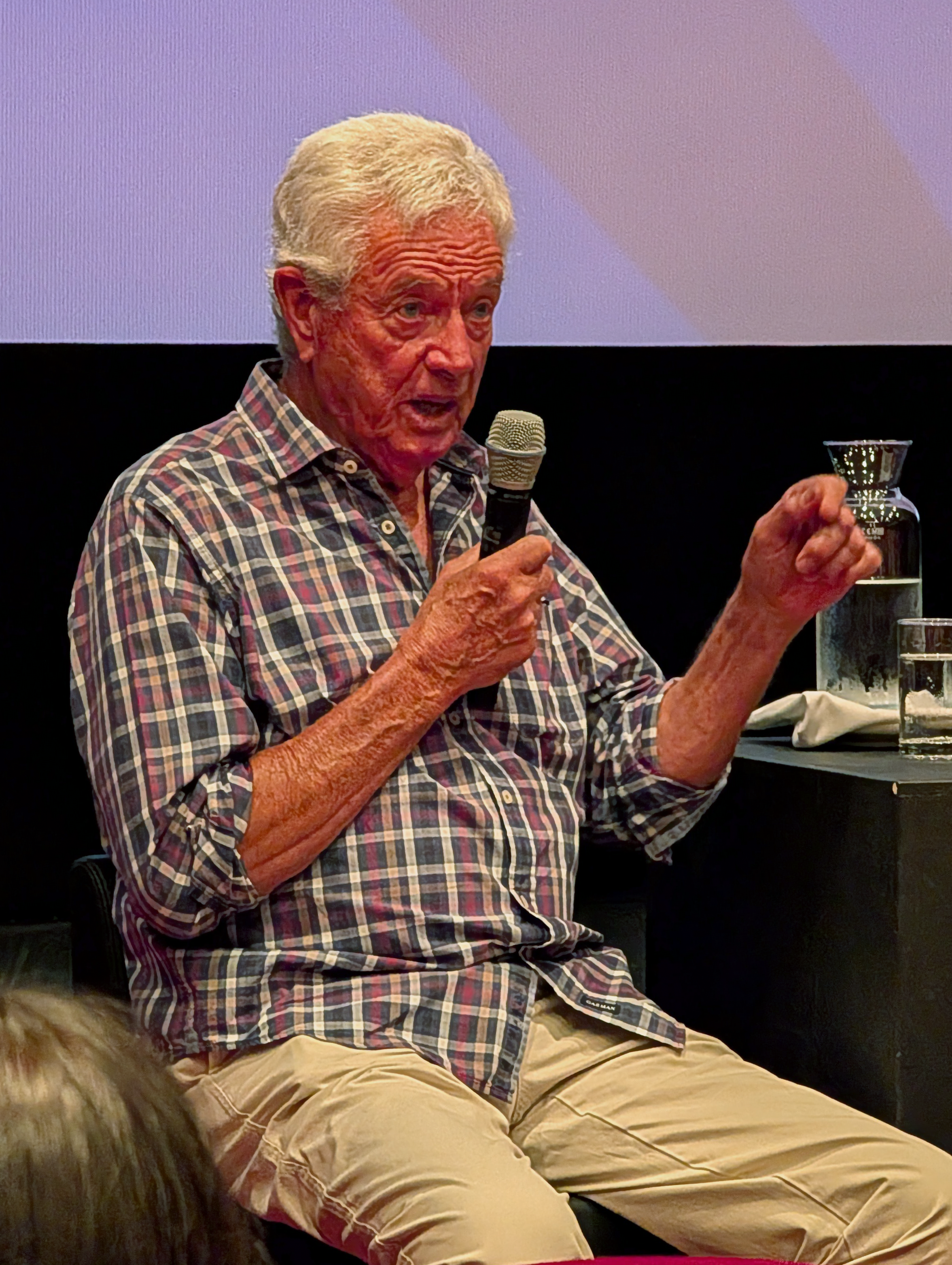
John Seale won once amongst 5 nominations for The English Patient (1996).

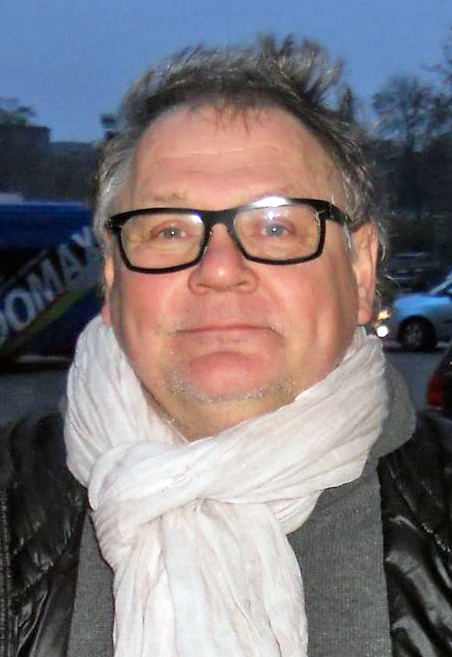
Janusz Kamiński won twice amongst 7 nominations, winning for Schindler's List (1993) and Saving Private Ryan (1998).

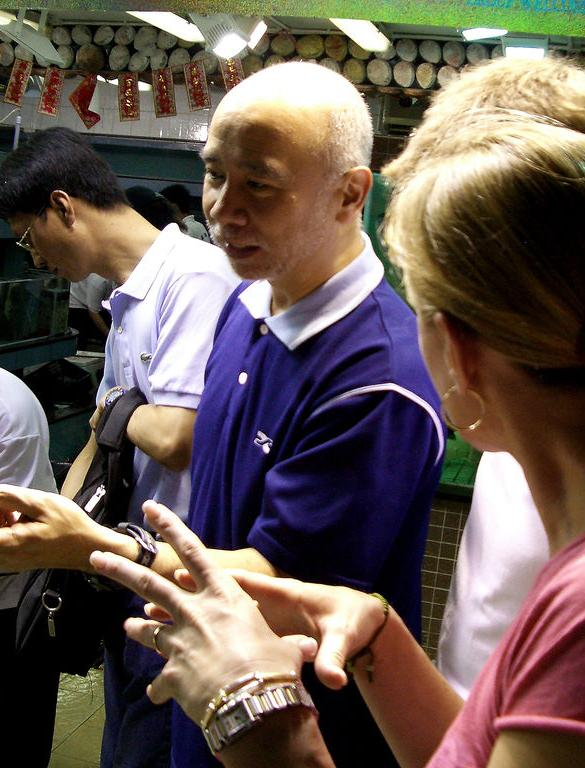
Peter Pau won for Crouching Tiger, Hidden Dragon (2000).

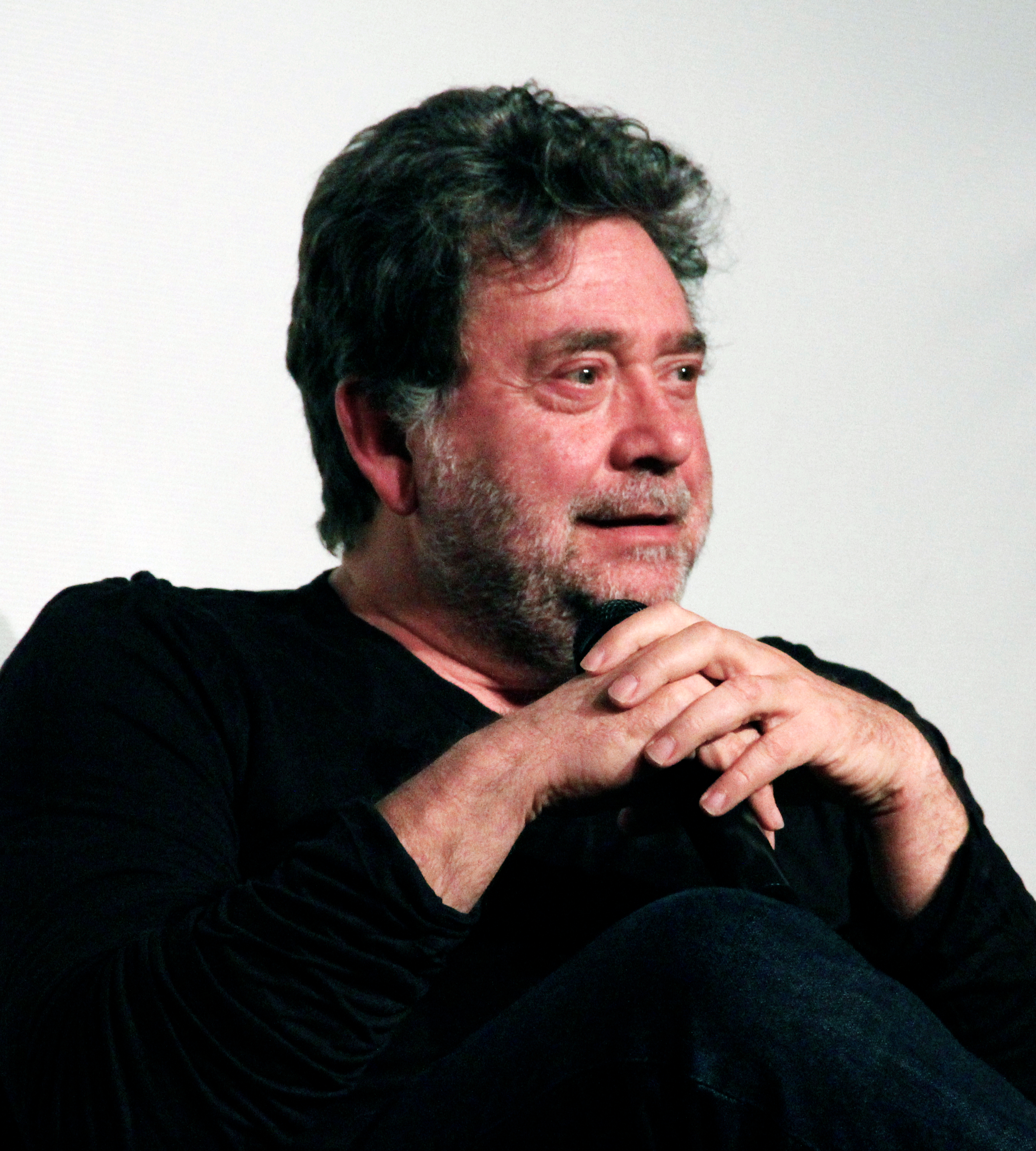
Guillermo Navarro won for Pan's Labryinth (2006).

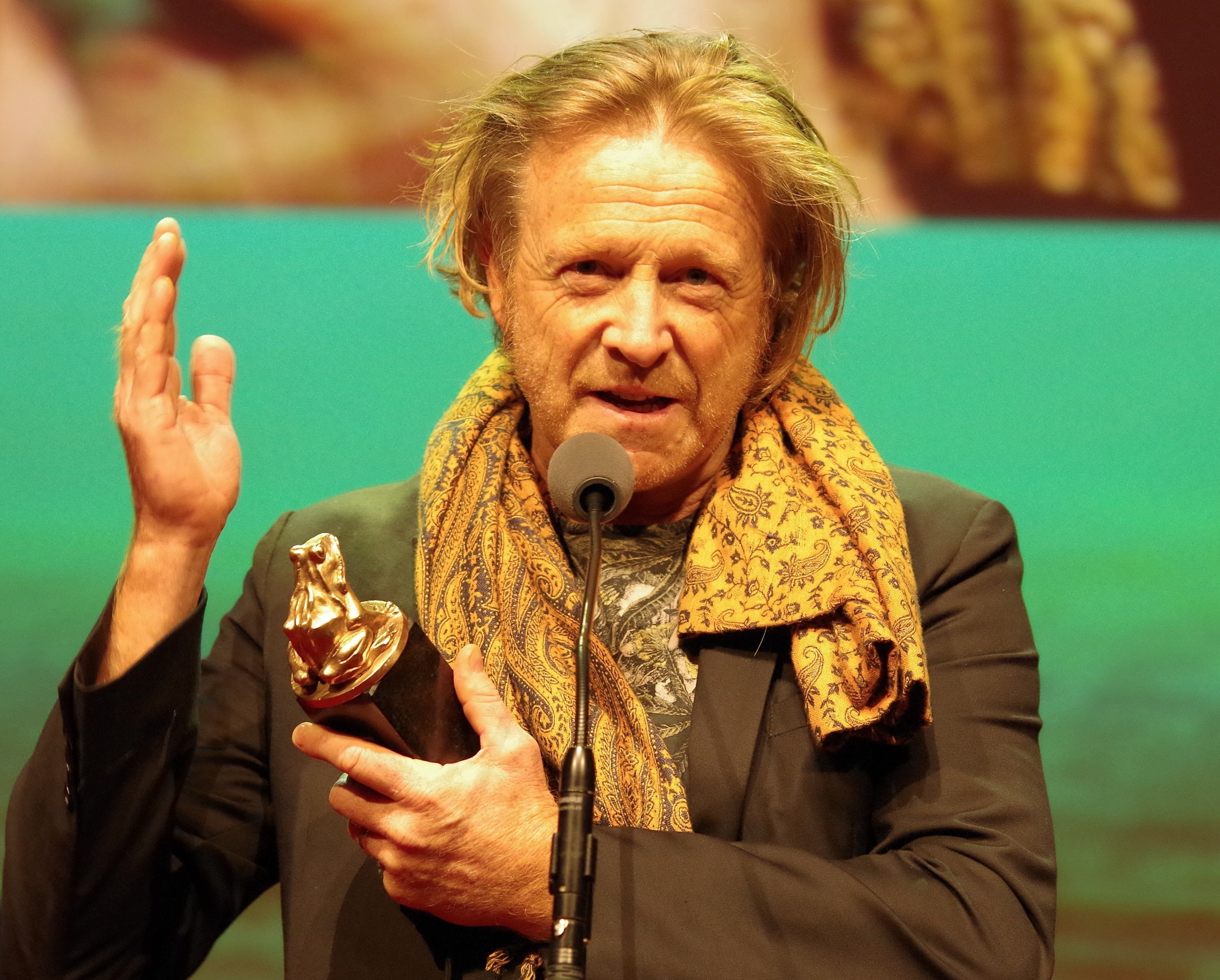
Anthony Dod Mantle won for Slumdog Millionaire (2008).

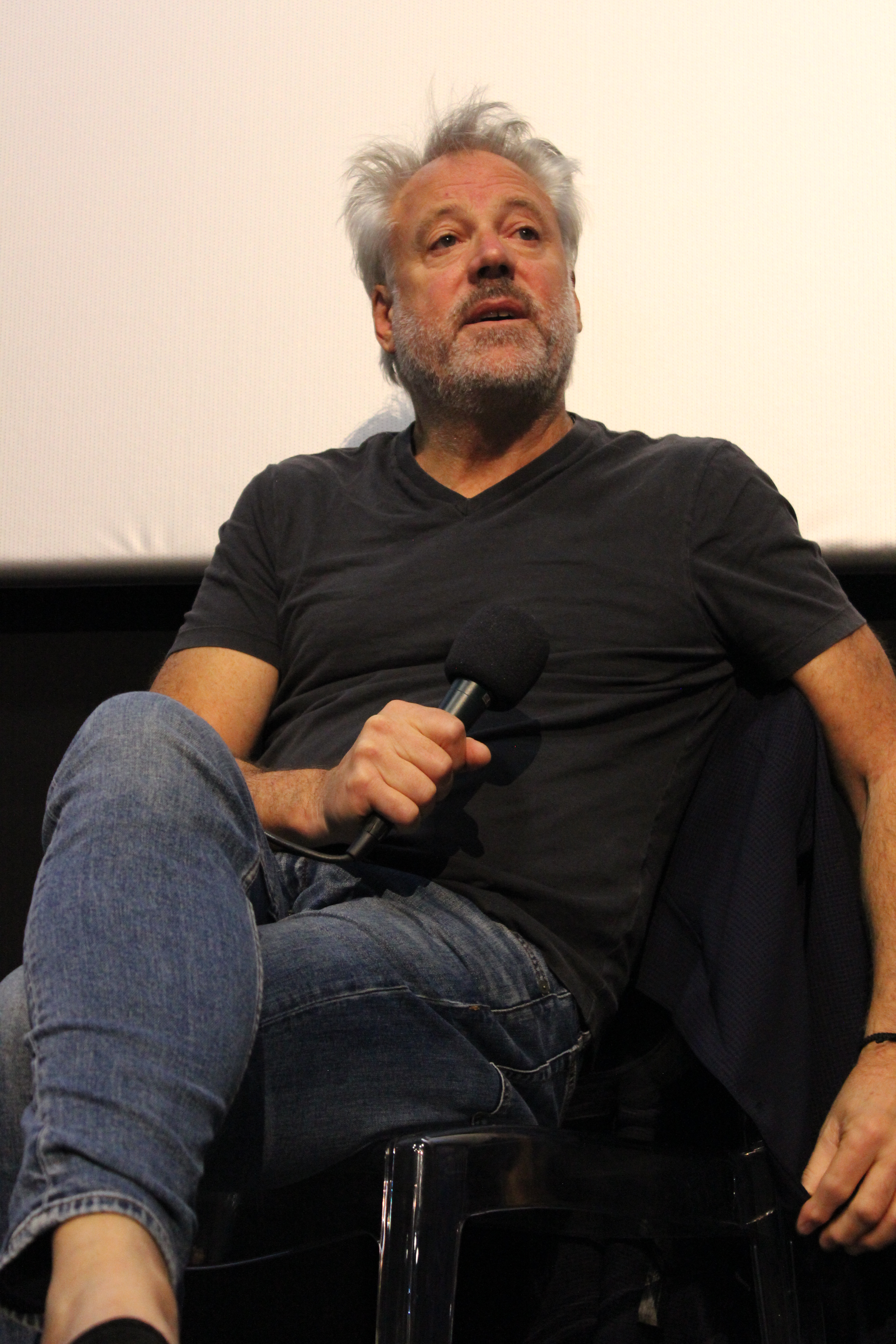
Wally Pfister won for Inception (2010).

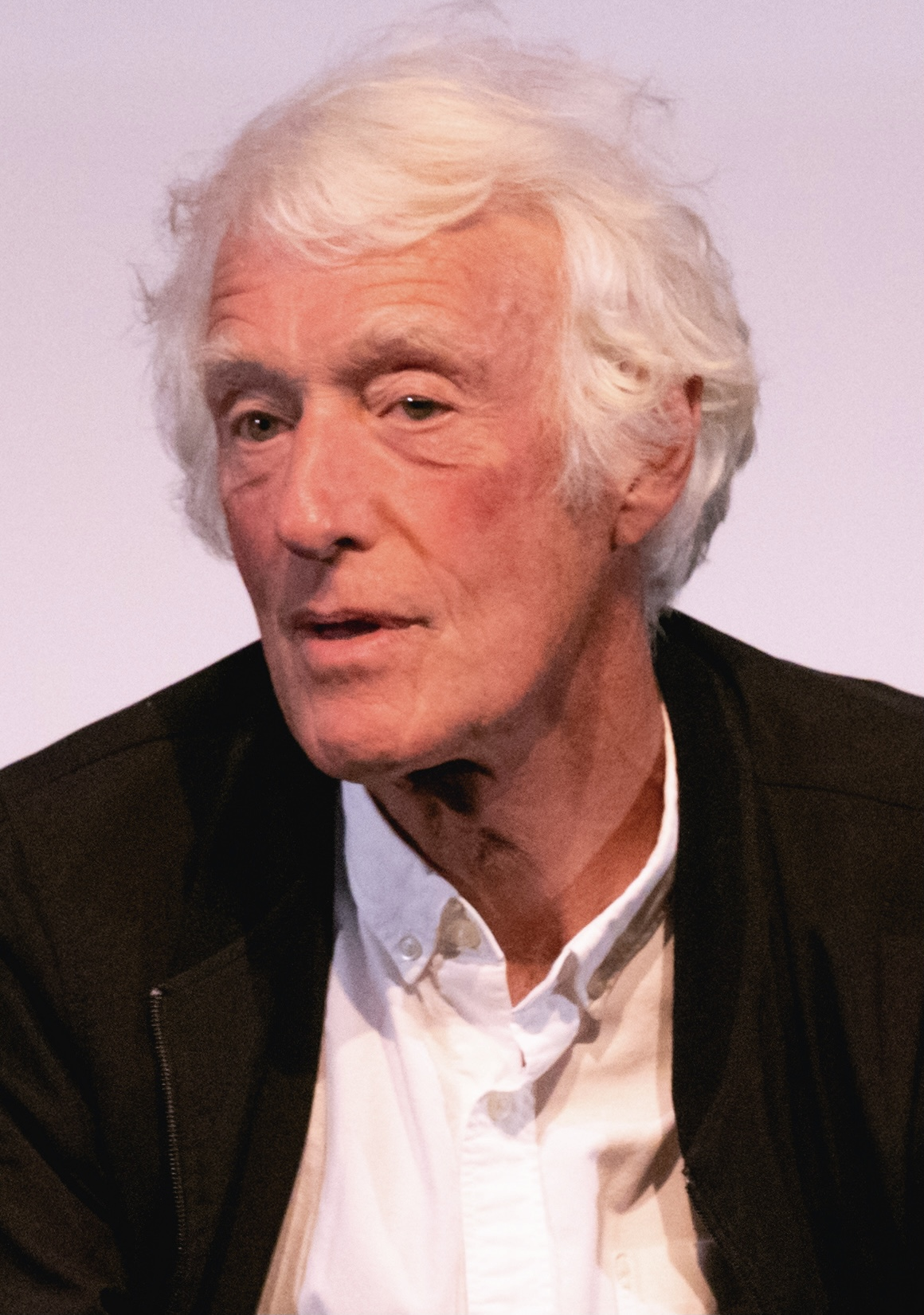
Roger Deakins won twice amongst 16 nominations, winning for Blade Runner 2049 (2017) and 1917 (2019).

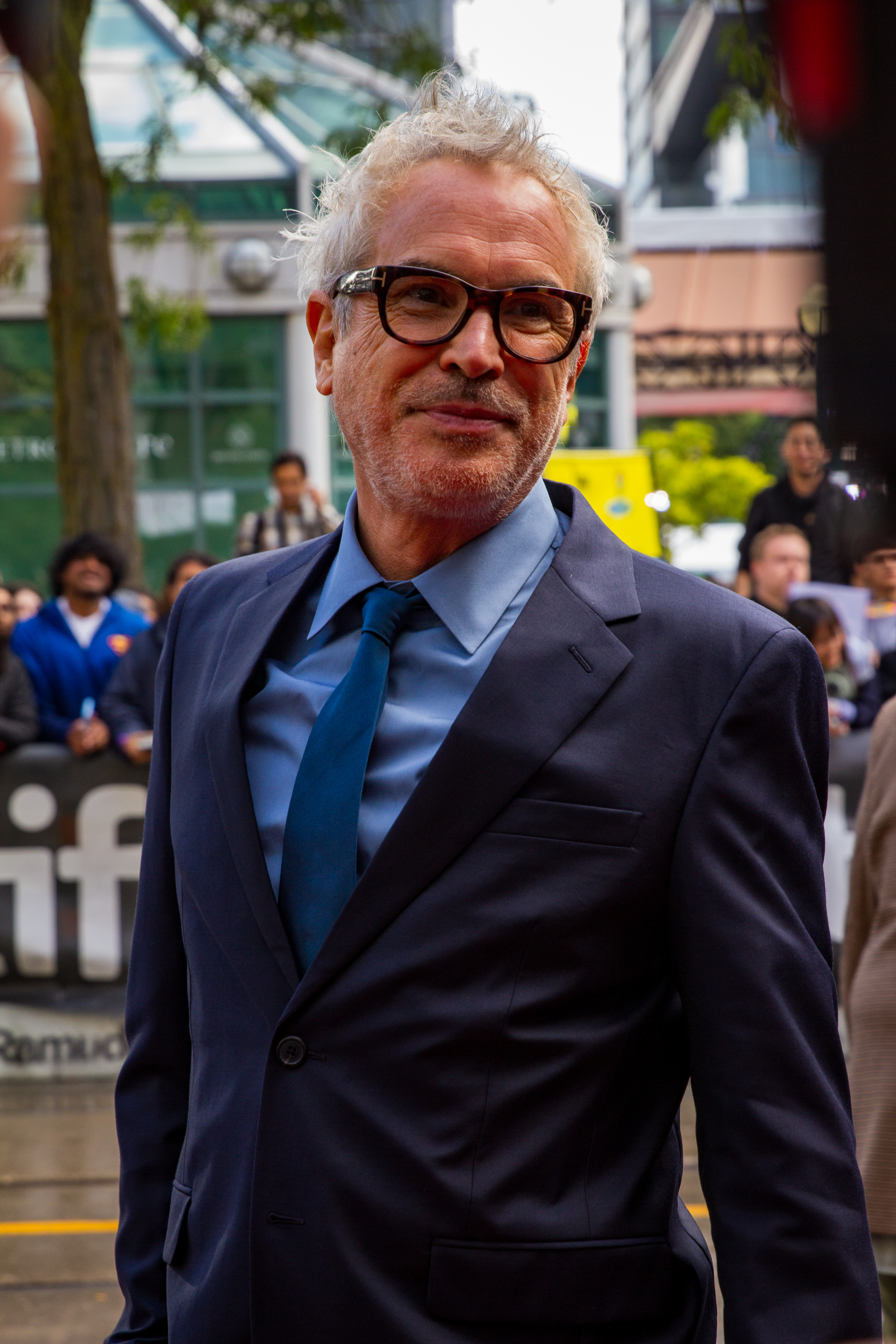
Alfonso Cuarón won for Roma (2018), becoming the first winner of the category to have also directed the film.

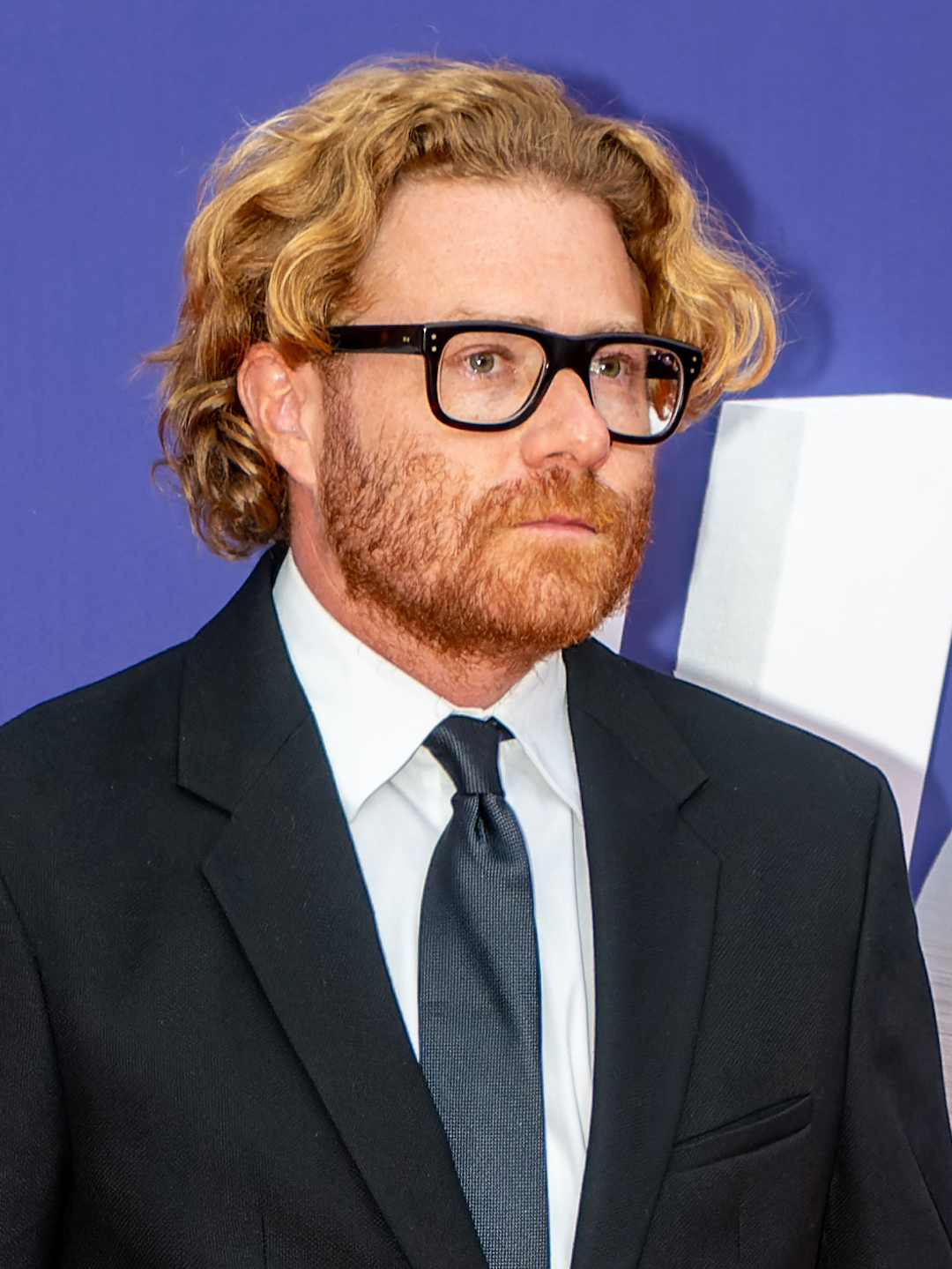
Erik Messerschmidt won for Mank (2020).

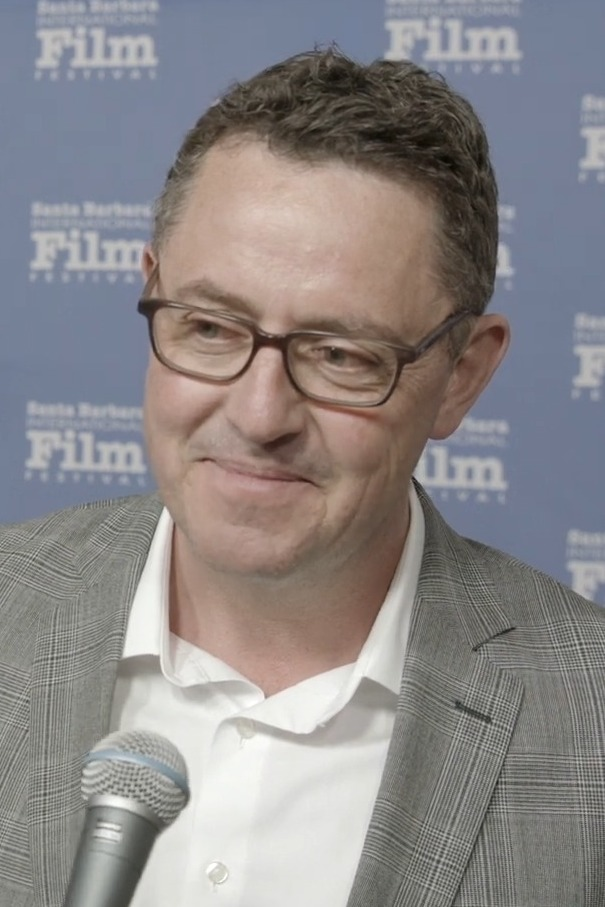
Greig Fraser won for Dune (2021).

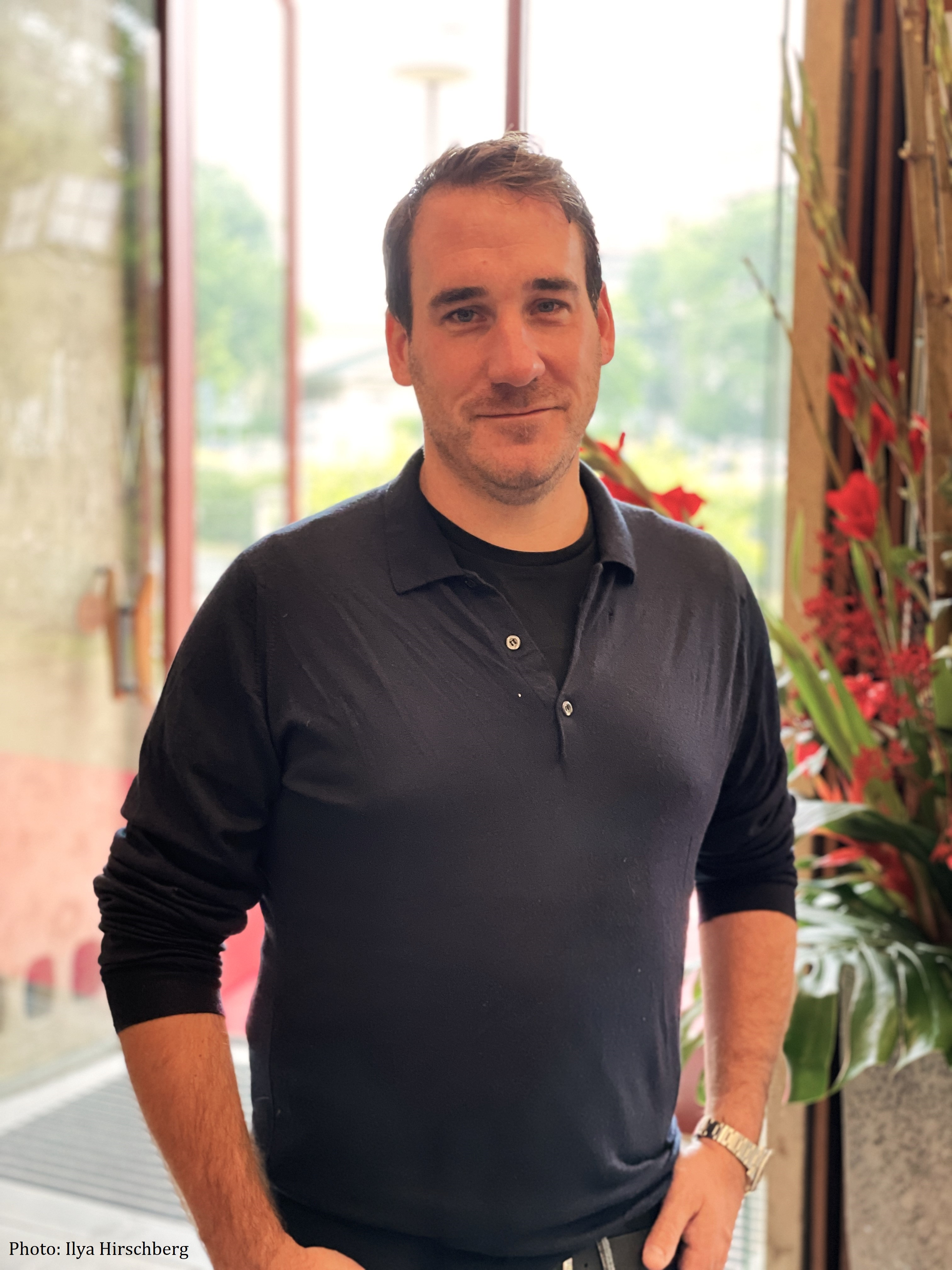
James Friend won for All Quiet on the Western Front (2022).

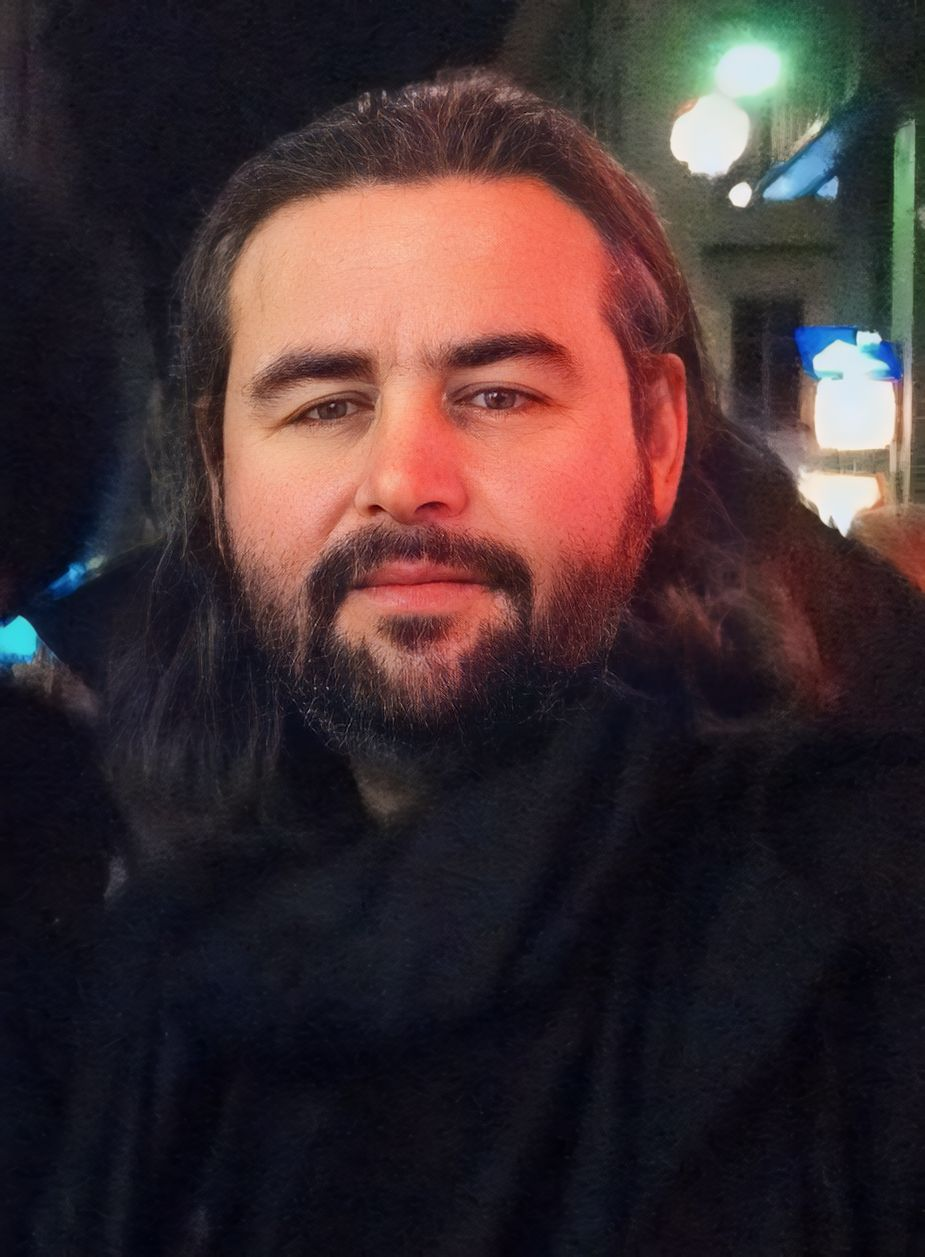
Hoyte van Hoytema won for Oppenheimer (2023).

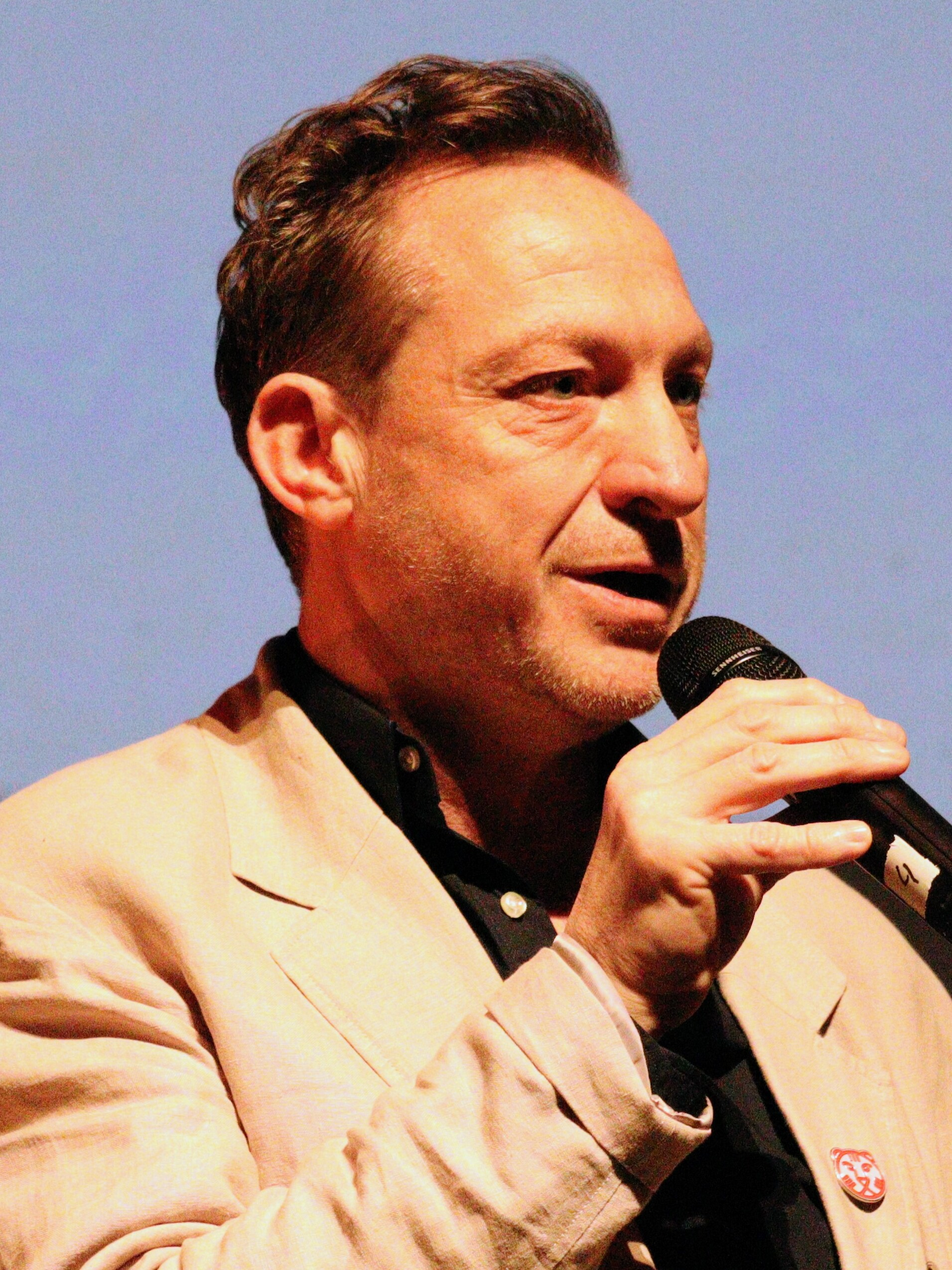
Lol Crawley won for The Brutalist (2024).

=== 1920s ===
Year	Film	Nominees
1927/28 (1st)	Sunrise: A Song of Two Humans	Charles Rosher; Karl Struss
1927/28 (1st)	The Devil Dancer	George Barnes
1927/28 (1st)	The Magic Flame	George Barnes
1927/28 (1st)	Sadie Thompson	George Barnes
1928/29 (2nd) (Note: The 2nd Academy Awards is unique in being the only occasion where there were no official nominees. Subsequent research by AMPAS has resulted in a list of unofficial or de facto nominees, based on records of which films were evaluated by the judges.)	White Shadows in the South Seas	Clyde De Vinna
1928/29 (2nd)	The Divine Lady	John F. Seitz
1928/29 (2nd)	4 Devils	Ernest Palmer
1928/29 (2nd)	In Old Arizona	Arthur Edeson
1928/29 (2nd)	Our Dancing Daughters	George Barnes
1928/29 (2nd)	Street Angel	Ernest Palmer

=== 1930s ===
Year	Film	Nominees
1929/30 (3rd)	With Byrd at the South Pole	Joseph T. Rucker and Willard Van der Veer
1929/30 (3rd)	All Quiet on the Western Front	Arthur Edeson
1929/30 (3rd)	Anna Christie	William H. Daniels
1929/30 (3rd)	Hell's Angels	Tony Gaudio and Harry Perry
1929/30 (3rd)	The Love Parade	Victor Milner
1930/31 (4th)	Tabu: A Story of the South Seas	Floyd Crosby
1930/31 (4th)	Cimarron	Edward Cronjager
1930/31 (4th)	Morocco	Lee Garmes
1930/31 (4th)	The Right to Love	Charles Lang
1930/31 (4th)	Svengali	Barney McGill
1931/32 (5th)	Shanghai Express	Lee Garmes
1931/32 (5th)	Arrowsmith	Ray June
1931/32 (5th)	Dr. Jekyll and Mr. Hyde	Karl Struss
1932/33 (6th)	A Farewell to Arms	Charles Lang
1932/33 (6th)	Reunion in Vienna	George Folsey
1932/33 (6th)	The Sign of the Cross	Karl Struss
1934 (7th)	Cleopatra	Victor Milner
1934 (7th)	The Affairs of Cellini	Charles Rosher
1934 (7th)	Operator 13	George Folsey
1935 (8th)	A Midsummer Night's Dream	Hal Mohr (Note: Having not been officially nominated, Hal Mohr was a write-in candidate and became the only write-in to ever win an Academy Award.)
1935 (8th)	Barbary Coast	Ray June
1935 (8th)	The Crusades	Victor Milner
1935 (8th)	Les Misérables	Gregg Toland
1936 (9th)	Black-and-White	
1936 (9th)	Anthony Adverse	Tony Gaudio
1936 (9th)	The General Died at Dawn	Victor Milner
1936 (9th)	The Gorgeous Hussy	George Folsey
1936 (9th)	Color (Special Achievement)	
1936 (9th)	The Garden of Allah	W. Howard Greene and Harold Rosson
1937 (10th)	Black-and-White	
1937 (10th)	The Good Earth	Karl Freund
1937 (10th)	Dead End	Gregg Toland
1937 (10th)	Wings over Honolulu	Joseph Valentine
1937 (10th)	Color (Special Achievement)	
1937 (10th)	A Star Is Born	W. Howard Greene
1938 (11th)	Black-and-White	
1938 (11th)	The Great Waltz	Joseph Ruttenberg
1938 (11th)	Algiers	James Wong Howe
1938 (11th)	Army Girl	Ernest Miller and Harry J. Wild
1938 (11th)	The Buccaneer	Victor Milner
1938 (11th)	Jezebel	Ernest Haller
1938 (11th)	Mad About Music	Joseph Valentine
1938 (11th)	Merrily We Live	Norbert Brodine
1938 (11th)	Suez	J. Peverell Marley
1938 (11th)	Vivacious Lady	Robert De Grasse
1938 (11th)	You Can't Take It with You	Joseph Walker
1938 (11th)	The Young in Heart	Leon Shamroy
1938 (11th)	Color (Special Achievement)	
1938 (11th)	Sweethearts	Oliver T. Marsh and Allen Davey
1939 (12th)	Black-and-White (Note: A preliminary list of submissions from the studios included the following titles, which were not official nominees: First Love (Joseph Valentine), The Great Victor Herbert (Victor Milner), Gunga Din (Joseph H. August), Intermezzo (Gregg Toland), Juarez (Tony Gaudio), Lady of the Tropics (Norbert Brodine), Only Angels Have Wings (Joseph Walker) and The Rains Came (Arthur C. Miller).)	
1939 (12th)	Wuthering Heights	Gregg Toland
1939 (12th)	Stagecoach	Bert Glennon
1939 (12th)	Color (Note: A preliminary list of submissions from the studios included the following titles, which were not official nominees: Drums Along the Mohawk (Ray Rennahan and Bert Glennon), The Four Feathers (Georges Périnal and Osmond Borradaile), The Mikado (William V. Skall) and The Wizard of Oz (Harold Rosson).)	
1939 (12th)	Gone with the Wind	Ernest Haller and Ray Rennahan
1939 (12th)	The Private Lives of Elizabeth and Essex	Sol Polito and W. Howard Greene

=== 1940s ===
Year	Film	Nominees
1940 (13th)	Black-and-White	
1940 (13th)	Rebecca	George Barnes
1940 (13th)	Abe Lincoln in Illinois	James Wong Howe
1940 (13th)	All This, and Heaven Too	Ernest Haller
1940 (13th)	Arise, My Love	Charles Lang
1940 (13th)	Boom Town	Harold Rosson
1940 (13th)	Foreign Correspondent	Rudolph Maté
1940 (13th)	The Letter	Tony Gaudio
1940 (13th)	The Long Voyage Home	Gregg Toland
1940 (13th)	Spring Parade	Joseph Valentine
1940 (13th)	Waterloo Bridge	Joseph Ruttenberg
1940 (13th)	Color	
1940 (13th)	The Thief of Bagdad	Georges Périnal
1940 (13th)	Bitter Sweet	Oliver T. Marsh and Allen M. Davey
1940 (13th)	The Blue Bird	Arthur C. Miller and Ray Rennahan
1940 (13th)	Down Argentine Way	Leon Shamroy and Ray Rennahan
1940 (13th)	North West Mounted Police	Victor Milner and W. Howard Greene
1940 (13th)	Northwest Passage	Sidney Wagner and William V. Skall
1941 (14th)	Black-and-White	
1941 (14th)	How Green Was My Valley	Arthur C. Miller
1941 (14th)	The Chocolate Soldier	Karl Freund
1941 (14th)	Citizen Kane	Gregg Toland
1941 (14th)	Dr. Jekyll and Mr. Hyde	Joseph Ruttenberg
1941 (14th)	Here Comes Mr. Jordan	Joseph Walker
1941 (14th)	Hold Back the Dawn	Leo Tover
1941 (14th)	Sergeant York	Sol Polito
1941 (14th)	Sun Valley Serenade	Edward Cronjager
1941 (14th)	Sundown	Charles Lang
1941 (14th)	That Hamilton Woman	Rudolph Maté
1941 (14th)	Color	
1941 (14th)	Blood and Sand	Ernest Palmer and Ray Rennahan
1941 (14th)	Aloma of the South Seas	Wilfred M. Cline, Karl Struss and William E. Snyder
1941 (14th)	Billy the Kid	William V. Skall and Leonard Smith
1941 (14th)	Blossoms in the Dust	Karl Freund and W. Howard Greene
1941 (14th)	Dive Bomber	Bert Glennon
1941 (14th)	Louisiana Purchase	Harry Hallenberger and Ray Rennahan
1942 (15th)	Black-and-White	
1942 (15th)	Mrs. Miniver	Joseph Ruttenberg
1942 (15th)	Kings Row	James Wong Howe
1942 (15th)	The Magnificent Ambersons	Stanley Cortez
1942 (15th)	Moontide	Charles G. Clarke
1942 (15th)	The Pied Piper	Edward Cronjager
1942 (15th)	The Pride of the Yankees	Rudolph Maté
1942 (15th)	Take a Letter, Darling	John J. Mescall
1942 (15th)	The Talk of the Town	Ted Tetzlaff
1942 (15th)	Ten Gentlemen from West Point	Leon Shamroy
1942 (15th)	This Above All	Arthur C. Miller
1942 (15th)	Color	
1942 (15th)	The Black Swan	Leon Shamroy
1942 (15th)	Arabian Nights	Milton Krasner, William V. Skall and W. Howard Greene
1942 (15th)	Captains of the Clouds	Sol Polito
1942 (15th)	Jungle Book	W. Howard Greene
1942 (15th)	Reap the Wild Wind	Victor Milner and William V. Skall
1942 (15th)	To the Shores of Tripoli	Edward Cronjager and William V. Skall
1943 (16th)	Black-and-White	
1943 (16th)	The Song of Bernadette	Arthur C. Miller
1943 (16th)	Air Force	James Wong Howe, Elmer Dyer and Charles A. Marshall
1943 (16th)	Casablanca	Arthur Edeson
1943 (16th)	Corvette K-225	Tony Gaudio
1943 (16th)	Five Graves to Cairo	John F. Seitz
1943 (16th)	The Human Comedy	Harry Stradling
1943 (16th)	Madame Curie	Joseph Ruttenberg
1943 (16th)	The North Star	James Wong Howe
1943 (16th)	Sahara	Rudolph Maté
1943 (16th)	So Proudly We Hail!	Charles Lang
1943 (16th)	Color	
1943 (16th)	Phantom of the Opera	Hal Mohr and W. Howard Greene
1943 (16th)	For Whom the Bell Tolls	Ray Rennahan
1943 (16th)	Heaven Can Wait	Edward Cronjager
1943 (16th)	Hello, Frisco, Hello	Charles G. Clarke and Allen M. Davey
1943 (16th)	Lassie Come Home	Leonard Smith
1943 (16th)	Thousands Cheer	George Folsey
1944 (17th)	Black-and-White	
1944 (17th)	Laura	Joseph LaShelle
1944 (17th)	Double Indemnity	John F. Seitz
1944 (17th)	Dragon Seed	Sidney Wagner
1944 (17th)	Gaslight	Joseph Ruttenberg
1944 (17th)	Going My Way	Lionel Lindon
1944 (17th)	Lifeboat	Glen MacWilliams
1944 (17th)	Since You Went Away	Stanley Cortez and Lee Garmes
1944 (17th)	Thirty Seconds Over Tokyo	Robert Surtees and Harold Rosson
1944 (17th)	The Uninvited	Charles Lang
1944 (17th)	The White Cliffs of Dover	George Folsey
1944 (17th)	Color	
1944 (17th)	Wilson	Leon Shamroy
1944 (17th)	Cover Girl	Rudolph Maté and Allen M. Davey
1944 (17th)	Home in Indiana	Edward Cronjager
1944 (17th)	Kismet	Charles Rosher
1944 (17th)	Lady in the Dark	Ray Rennahan
1944 (17th)	Meet Me in St. Louis	George Folsey
1945 (18th)	Black-and-White	
1945 (18th)	The Picture of Dorian Gray	Harry Stradling
1945 (18th)	The Keys of the Kingdom	Arthur C. Miller
1945 (18th)	The Lost Weekend	John F. Seitz
1945 (18th)	Mildred Pierce	Ernest Haller
1945 (18th)	Spellbound	George Barnes
1945 (18th)	Color	
1945 (18th)	Leave Her to Heaven	Leon Shamroy
1945 (18th)	Anchors Aweigh	Robert H. Planck and Charles P. Boyle
1945 (18th)	National Velvet	Leonard Smith
1945 (18th)	A Song to Remember	Tony Gaudio and Allen M. Davey
1945 (18th)	The Spanish Main	George Barnes
1946 (19th)	Black-and-White	
1946 (19th)	Anna and the King of Siam	Arthur C. Miller
1946 (19th)	The Green Years	George Folsey
1946 (19th)	Color	
1946 (19th)	The Yearling	Charles Rosher, Leonard Smith and Arthur Arling
1946 (19th)	The Jolson Story	Joseph Walker
1947 (20th)	Black-and-White	
1947 (20th)	Great Expectations	Guy Green
1947 (20th)	Green Dolphin Street	George Folsey
1947 (20th)	The Ghost and Mrs. Muir	Charles Lang
1947 (20th)	Color	
1947 (20th)	Black Narcissus	Jack Cardiff
1947 (20th)	Life with Father	J. Peverell Marley and William V. Skall
1947 (20th)	Mother Wore Tights	Harry Jackson
1948 (21st)	Black-and-White	
1948 (21st)	The Naked City	William Daniels
1948 (21st)	A Foreign Affair	Charles Lang
1948 (21st)	I Remember Mama	Nicholas Musuraca
1948 (21st)	Johnny Belinda	Ted McCord
1948 (21st)	Portrait of Jennie	Joseph August (posthumously)
1948 (21st)	Color	
1948 (21st)	Joan of Arc	Joseph Valentine, William V. Skall and Winton C. Hoch
1948 (21st)	Green Grass of Wyoming	Charles G. Clarke
1948 (21st)	The Loves of Carmen	William E. Snyder
1948 (21st)	The Three Musketeers	Robert H. Planck
1949 (22nd)	Black-and-White	
1949 (22nd)	Battleground	Paul C. Vogel
1949 (22nd)	Champion	Franz Planer
1949 (22nd)	Come to the Stable	Joseph LaShelle
1949 (22nd)	The Heiress	Leo Tover
1949 (22nd)	Prince of Foxes	Leon Shamroy
1949 (22nd)	Color	
1949 (22nd)	She Wore a Yellow Ribbon	Winton C. Hoch
1949 (22nd)	The Barkleys of Broadway	Harry Stradling
1949 (22nd)	Jolson Sings Again	William E. Snyder
1949 (22nd)	Little Women	Robert H. Planck and Charles Schoenbaum
1949 (22nd)	Sand	Charles G. Clarke

=== 1950s ===
Year	Film	Nominees
1950 (23rd)	Black-and-White	
1950 (23rd)	The Third Man	Robert Krasker
1950 (23rd)	All About Eve	Milton Krasner
1950 (23rd)	The Asphalt Jungle	Harold Rosson
1950 (23rd)	The Furies	Victor Milner
1950 (23rd)	Sunset Boulevard	John F. Seitz
1950 (23rd)	Color	
1950 (23rd)	King Solomon's Mines	Robert Surtees
1950 (23rd)	Annie Get Your Gun	Charles Rosher
1950 (23rd)	Broken Arrow	Ernest Palmer
1950 (23rd)	The Flame and the Arrow	Ernest Haller
1950 (23rd)	Samson and Delilah	George Barnes
1951 (24th)	Black-and-White	
1951 (24th)	A Place in the Sun	William C. Mellor
1951 (24th)	Death of a Salesman	Franz Planer
1951 (24th)	The Frogmen	Norbert Brodine
1951 (24th)	Strangers on a Train	Robert Burks
1951 (24th)	A Streetcar Named Desire	Harry Stradling
1951 (24th)	Color	
1951 (24th)	An American in Paris	Alfred Gilks and John Alton
1951 (24th)	David and Bathsheba	Leon Shamroy
1951 (24th)	Quo Vadis	Robert Surtees and William V. Skall
1951 (24th)	Show Boat	Charles Rosher
1951 (24th)	When Worlds Collide	John F. Seitz and W. Howard Greene
1952 (25th)	Black-and-White	
1952 (25th)	The Bad and the Beautiful	Robert Surtees
1952 (25th)	The Big Sky	Russell Harlan
1952 (25th)	My Cousin Rachel	Joseph LaShelle
1952 (25th)	Navajo	Virgil Miller
1952 (25th)	Sudden Fear	Charles Lang
1952 (25th)	Color	
1952 (25th)	The Quiet Man	Winton C. Hoch and Archie Stout
1952 (25th)	Hans Christian Andersen	Harry Stradling
1952 (25th)	Ivanhoe	Freddie Young
1952 (25th)	Million Dollar Mermaid	George Folsey
1952 (25th)	The Snows of Kilimanjaro	Leon Shamroy
1953 (26th)	Black-and-White	
1953 (26th)	From Here to Eternity	Burnett Guffey
1953 (26th)	The Four Poster	Hal Mohr
1953 (26th)	Julius Caesar	Joseph Ruttenberg
1953 (26th)	Martin Luther	Joseph C. Brun
1953 (26th)	Roman Holiday	Franz Planer and Henri Alekan
1953 (26th)	Color	
1953 (26th)	Shane	Loyal Griggs
1953 (26th)	All the Brothers Were Valiant	George Folsey
1953 (26th)	Beneath the 12-Mile Reef	Edward Cronjager
1953 (26th)	Lili	Robert H. Planck
1953 (26th)	The Robe	Leon Shamroy
1954 (27th)	Black-and-White	
1954 (27th)	On the Waterfront	Boris Kaufman
1954 (27th)	The Country Girl	John F. Warren
1954 (27th)	Executive Suite	George Folsey
1954 (27th)	Rogue Cop	John F. Seitz
1954 (27th)	Sabrina	Charles Lang
1954 (27th)	Color	
1954 (27th)	Three Coins in the Fountain	Milton Krasner
1954 (27th)	The Egyptian	Leon Shamroy
1954 (27th)	Rear Window	Robert Burks
1954 (27th)	Seven Brides for Seven Brothers	George Folsey
1954 (27th)	The Silver Chalice	William V. Skall
1955 (28th)	Black-and-White	
1955 (28th)	The Rose Tattoo	James Wong Howe
1955 (28th)	Blackboard Jungle	Russell Harlan
1955 (28th)	I'll Cry Tomorrow	Arthur Arling
1955 (28th)	Marty	Joseph LaShelle
1955 (28th)	Queen Bee	Charles Lang
1955 (28th)	Color	
1955 (28th)	To Catch a Thief	Robert Burks
1955 (28th)	Guys and Dolls	Harry Stradling
1955 (28th)	Love Is a Many-Splendored Thing	Leon Shamroy
1955 (28th)	A Man Called Peter	Harold Lipstein
1955 (28th)	Oklahoma!	Robert Surtees
1956 (29th)	Black-and-White	
1956 (29th)	Somebody Up There Likes Me	Joseph Ruttenberg
1956 (29th)	Baby Doll	Boris Kaufman
1956 (29th)	The Bad Seed	Harold Rosson
1956 (29th)	The Harder They Fall	Burnett Guffey
1956 (29th)	Stagecoach to Fury	Walter Strenge
1956 (29th)	Color	
1956 (29th)	Around the World in 80 Days	Lionel Lindon
1956 (29th)	The Eddy Duchin Story	Harry Stradling
1956 (29th)	The King and I	Leon Shamroy
1956 (29th)	The Ten Commandments	Loyal Griggs
1956 (29th)	War and Peace	Jack Cardiff
1957 (30th) (Note: In 1957, black-and-white and color films competed in a combined Best Cinematography category.)	The Bridge on the River Kwai	Jack Hildyard
1957 (30th)	An Affair to Remember	Milton Krasner
1957 (30th)	Funny Face	Ray June
1957 (30th)	Peyton Place	William C. Mellor
1957 (30th)	Sayonara	Ellsworth Fredricks
1958 (31st)	Black-and-White	
1958 (31st)	The Defiant Ones	Sam Leavitt
1958 (31st)	Desire Under the Elms	Daniel L. Fapp
1958 (31st)	I Want to Live!	Lionel Lindon
1958 (31st)	Separate Tables	Charles Lang
1958 (31st)	The Young Lions	Joseph MacDonald
1958 (31st)	Color	
1958 (31st)	Gigi	Joseph Ruttenberg
1958 (31st)	Auntie Mame	Harry Stradling
1958 (31st)	Cat on a Hot Tin Roof	William Daniels
1958 (31st)	The Old Man and the Sea	James Wong Howe
1958 (31st)	South Pacific	Leon Shamroy
1959 (32nd)	Black-and-White	
1959 (32nd)	The Diary of Anne Frank	William C. Mellor
1959 (32nd)	Anatomy of a Murder	Sam Leavitt
1959 (32nd)	Career	Joseph LaShelle
1959 (32nd)	Some Like It Hot	Charles Lang
1959 (32nd)	The Young Philadelphians	Harry Stradling
1959 (32nd)	Color	
1959 (32nd)	Ben-Hur	Robert Surtees
1959 (32nd)	The Big Fisherman	Lee Garmes
1959 (32nd)	The Five Pennies	Daniel L. Fapp
1959 (32nd)	The Nun's Story	Franz Planer
1959 (32nd)	Porgy and Bess	Leon Shamroy

=== 1960s ===
Year	Film	Nominees
1960 (33rd)	Black-and-White	
1960 (33rd)	Sons and Lovers	Freddie Francis
1960 (33rd)	The Apartment	Joseph LaShelle
1960 (33rd)	The Facts of Life	Charles Lang
1960 (33rd)	Inherit the Wind	Ernest Laszlo
1960 (33rd)	Psycho	John L. Russell
1960 (33rd)	Color	
1960 (33rd)	Spartacus	Russell Metty
1960 (33rd)	The Alamo	William H. Clothier
1960 (33rd)	BUtterfield 8	Joseph Ruttenberg and Charles Harten
1960 (33rd)	Exodus	Sam Leavitt
1960 (33rd)	Pepe	Joseph MacDonald
1961 (34th)	Black-and-White	
1961 (34th)	The Hustler	Eugen Schüfftan
1961 (34th)	The Absent-Minded Professor	Edward Colman
1961 (34th)	The Children's Hour	Franz Planer
1961 (34th)	Judgment at Nuremberg	Ernest Laszlo
1961 (34th)	One, Two, Three	Daniel L. Fapp
1961 (34th)	Color	
1961 (34th)	West Side Story	Daniel L. Fapp
1961 (34th)	Fanny	Jack Cardiff
1961 (34th)	Flower Drum Song	Russell Metty
1961 (34th)	A Majority of One	Harry Stradling
1961 (34th)	One-Eyed Jacks	Charles Lang
1962 (35th)	Black-and-White	
1962 (35th)	The Longest Day	Jean Bourgoin and Walter Wottitz
1962 (35th)	Birdman of Alcatraz	Burnett Guffey
1962 (35th)	To Kill a Mockingbird	Russell Harlan
1962 (35th)	Two for the Seesaw	Ted D. McCord
1962 (35th)	What Ever Happened to Baby Jane?	Ernest Haller
1962 (35th)	Color	
1962 (35th)	Lawrence of Arabia	Freddie Young
1962 (35th)	Gypsy	Harry Stradling
1962 (35th)	Hatari!	Russell Harlan
1962 (35th)	Mutiny on the Bounty	Robert Surtees
1962 (35th)	The Wonderful World of the Brothers Grimm	Paul C. Vogel
1963 (36th)	Black-and-White	
1963 (36th)	Hud	James Wong Howe
1963 (36th)	The Balcony	George Folsey
1963 (36th)	The Caretakers	Lucien Ballard
1963 (36th)	Lilies of the Field	Ernest Haller
1963 (36th)	Love with the Proper Stranger	Milton Krasner
1963 (36th)	Color	
1963 (36th)	Cleopatra	Leon Shamroy
1963 (36th)	The Cardinal	Leon Shamroy
1963 (36th)	How the West Was Won	William Daniels, Milton Krasner, Charles Lang and Joseph LaShelle
1963 (36th)	Irma la Douce	Joseph LaShelle
1963 (36th)	It's a Mad, Mad, Mad, Mad World	Ernest Laszlo
1964 (37th)
1964 (37th)	Black-and-White	
1964 (37th)	Zorba the Greek	Walter Lassally
1964 (37th)	The Americanization of Emily	Philip H. Lathrop
1964 (37th)	Fate Is the Hunter	Milton Krasner
1964 (37th)	Hush...Hush, Sweet Charlotte	Joseph Biroc
1964 (37th)	The Night of the Iguana	Gabriel Figueroa
1964 (37th)	Color	
1964 (37th)	My Fair Lady	Harry Stradling
1964 (37th)	Becket	Geoffrey Unsworth
1964 (37th)	Cheyenne Autumn	William H. Clothier
1964 (37th)	Mary Poppins	Edward Colman
1964 (37th)	The Unsinkable Molly Brown	Daniel L. Fapp
1965 (38th)	Black-and-White	
1965 (38th)	Ship of Fools	Ernest Laszlo
1965 (38th)	In Harm's Way	Loyal Griggs
1965 (38th)	King Rat	Burnett Guffey
1965 (38th)	Morituri	Conrad L. Hall
1965 (38th)	A Patch of Blue	Robert Burks
1965 (38th)	Color	
1965 (38th)	Doctor Zhivago	Freddie Young
1965 (38th)	The Agony and the Ecstasy	Leon Shamroy
1965 (38th)	The Great Race	Russell Harlan
1965 (38th)	The Greatest Story Ever Told	William C. Mellor and Loyal Griggs
1965 (38th)	The Sound of Music	Ted D. McCord
1966 (39th)	Black-and-White	
1966 (39th)	Who's Afraid of Virginia Woolf?	Haskell Wexler
1966 (39th)	The Fortune Cookie	Joseph LaShelle
1966 (39th)	Georgy Girl	Kenneth Higgins
1966 (39th)	Is Paris Burning?	Marcel Grignon
1966 (39th)	Seconds	James Wong Howe
1966 (39th)	Color	
1966 (39th)	A Man for All Seasons	Ted Moore
1966 (39th)	Fantastic Voyage	Ernest Laszlo
1966 (39th)	Hawaii	Russell Harlan
1966 (39th)	The Professionals	Conrad L. Hall
1966 (39th)	The Sand Pebbles	Joseph MacDonald
1967 (40th)	Bonnie and Clyde	Burnett Guffey
1967 (40th)	Camelot	Richard H. Kline
1967 (40th)	Doctor Dolittle	Robert Surtees
1967 (40th)	The Graduate	Robert Surtees
1967 (40th)	In Cold Blood	Conrad L. Hall
1968 (41st)	Romeo and Juliet	Pasqualino De Santis
1968 (41st)	Funny Girl	Harry Stradling
1968 (41st)	Ice Station Zebra	Daniel L. Fapp
1968 (41st)	Oliver!	Oswald Morris
1968 (41st)	Star!	Ernest Laszlo
1969 (42nd)	Butch Cassidy and the Sundance Kid	Conrad L. Hall
1969 (42nd)	Anne of the Thousand Days	Arthur Ibbetson
1969 (42nd)	Bob & Carol & Ted & Alice	Charles Lang
1969 (42nd)	Hello, Dolly!	Harry Stradling (posthumously)
1969 (42nd)	Marooned	Daniel L. Fapp

=== 1970s ===
Year	Film	Nominees
1970 (43rd)	Ryan's Daughter	Freddie Young
1970 (43rd)	Airport	Ernest Laszlo
1970 (43rd)	Patton	Fred J. Koenekamp
1970 (43rd)	Tora! Tora! Tora!	Osamu Furuya, Shinsaku Himeda, Masamichi Satoh and Charles F. Wheeler
1970 (43rd)	Women in Love	Billy Williams
1971 (44th)	Fiddler on the Roof	Oswald Morris
1971 (44th)	The French Connection	Owen Roizman
1971 (44th)	The Last Picture Show	Robert Surtees
1971 (44th)	Nicholas and Alexandra	Freddie Young
1971 (44th)	Summer of '42	Robert Surtees
1972 (45th)	Cabaret	Geoffrey Unsworth
1972 (45th)	1776	Harry Stradling Jr.
1972 (45th)	Butterflies Are Free	Charles Lang
1972 (45th)	The Poseidon Adventure	Harold E. Stine
1972 (45th)	Travels with My Aunt	Douglas Slocombe
1973 (46th)	Cries and Whispers	Sven Nykvist
1973 (46th)	The Exorcist	Owen Roizman
1973 (46th)	Jonathan Livingston Seagull	Jack Couffer
1973 (46th)	The Sting	Robert Surtees
1973 (46th)	The Way We Were	Harry Stradling Jr.
1974 (47th)	The Towering Inferno	Fred J. Koenekamp and Joseph Biroc
1974 (47th)	Chinatown	John A. Alonzo
1974 (47th)	Earthquake	Philip H. Lathrop
1974 (47th)	Lenny	Bruce Surtees
1974 (47th)	Murder on the Orient Express	Geoffrey Unsworth
1975 (48th)	Barry Lyndon	John Alcott
1975 (48th)	The Day of the Locust	Conrad L. Hall
1975 (48th)	Funny Lady	James Wong Howe
1975 (48th)	The Hindenburg	Robert Surtees
1975 (48th)	One Flew Over the Cuckoo's Nest	Haskell Wexler and Bill Butler
1976 (49th)	Bound for Glory	Haskell Wexler
1976 (49th)	King Kong	Richard H. Kline
1976 (49th)	Logan's Run	Ernest Laszlo
1976 (49th)	Network	Owen Roizman
1976 (49th)	A Star Is Born	Robert Surtees
1977 (50th)	Close Encounters of the Third Kind	Vilmos Zsigmond
1977 (50th)	Islands in the Stream	Fred J. Koenekamp
1977 (50th)	Julia	Douglas Slocombe
1977 (50th)	Looking for Mr. Goodbar	William A. Fraker
1977 (50th)	The Turning Point	Robert Surtees
1978 (51st)	Days of Heaven	Néstor Almendros
1978 (51st)	The Deer Hunter	Vilmos Zsigmond
1978 (51st)	Heaven Can Wait	William A. Fraker
1978 (51st)	Same Time, Next Year	Robert Surtees
1978 (51st)	The Wiz	Oswald Morris
1979 (52nd)	Apocalypse Now	Vittorio Storaro
1979 (52nd)	1941	William A. Fraker
1979 (52nd)	All That Jazz	Giuseppe Rotunno
1979 (52nd)	The Black Hole	Frank V. Phillips
1979 (52nd)	Kramer vs. Kramer	Néstor Almendros

=== 1980s ===
Year	Film	Nominees
1980 (53rd)	Tess	Geoffrey Unsworth (posthumously) and Ghislain Cloquet
1980 (53rd)	The Blue Lagoon	Néstor Almendros
1980 (53rd)	Coal Miner's Daughter	Ralf D. Bode
1980 (53rd)	The Formula	James Crabe
1980 (53rd)	Raging Bull	Michael Chapman
1981 (54th)	Reds	Vittorio Storaro
1981 (54th)	Excalibur	Alex Thomson
1981 (54th)	On Golden Pond	Billy Williams
1981 (54th)	Ragtime	Miroslav Ondříček
1981 (54th)	Raiders of the Lost Ark	Douglas Slocombe
1982 (55th)	Gandhi	Billy Williams and Ronnie Taylor
1982 (55th)	Das Boot	Jost Vacano
1982 (55th)	E.T. the Extra-Terrestrial	Allen Daviau
1982 (55th)	Sophie's Choice	Néstor Almendros
1982 (55th)	Tootsie	Owen Roizman
1983 (56th)	Fanny and Alexander	Sven Nykvist
1983 (56th)	Flashdance	Don Peterman
1983 (56th)	The Right Stuff	Caleb Deschanel
1983 (56th)	WarGames	William A. Fraker
1983 (56th)	Zelig	Gordon Willis
1984 (57th)	The Killing Fields	Chris Menges
1984 (57th)	Amadeus	Miroslav Ondříček
1984 (57th)	The Natural	Caleb Deschanel
1984 (57th)	A Passage to India	Ernest Day
1984 (57th)	The River	Vilmos Zsigmond
1985 (58th)	Out of Africa	David Watkin
1985 (58th)	The Color Purple	Allen Daviau
1985 (58th)	Murphy's Romance	William A. Fraker
1985 (58th)	Ran	Takao Saito, Shoji Ueda, and Asakazu Nakai
1985 (58th)	Witness	John Seale
1986 (59th)	The Mission	Chris Menges
1986 (59th)	Peggy Sue Got Married	Jordan Cronenweth
1986 (59th)	Platoon	Robert Richardson
1986 (59th)	A Room with a View	Tony Pierce-Roberts
1986 (59th)	Star Trek IV: The Voyage Home	Don Peterman
1987 (60th)	The Last Emperor	Vittorio Storaro
1987 (60th)	Broadcast News	Michael Ballhaus
1987 (60th)	Empire of the Sun	Allen Daviau
1987 (60th)	Hope and Glory	Philippe Rousselot
1987 (60th)	Matewan	Haskell Wexler
1988 (61st)	Mississippi Burning	Peter Biziou
1988 (61st)	Rain Man	John Seale
1988 (61st)	Tequila Sunrise	Conrad L. Hall
1988 (61st)	The Unbearable Lightness of Being	Sven Nykvist
1988 (61st)	Who Framed Roger Rabbit	Dean Cundey
1989 (62nd)	Glory	Freddie Francis
1989 (62nd)	The Abyss	Mikael Salomon
1989 (62nd)	Blaze	Haskell Wexler
1989 (62nd)	Born on the Fourth of July	Robert Richardson
1989 (62nd)	The Fabulous Baker Boys	Michael Ballhaus

=== 1990s ===
Year	Film	Nominees
1990 (63rd)	Dances With Wolves	Dean Semler
1990 (63rd)	Avalon	Allen Daviau
1990 (63rd)	Dick Tracy	Vittorio Storaro
1990 (63rd)	The Godfather Part III	Gordon Willis
1990 (63rd)	Henry & June	Philippe Rousselot
1991 (64th)	JFK	Robert Richardson
1991 (64th)	Bugsy	Allen Daviau
1991 (64th)	The Prince of Tides	Stephen Goldblatt
1991 (64th)	Terminator 2: Judgment Day	Adam Greenberg
1991 (64th)	Thelma & Louise	Adrian Biddle
1992 (65th)	A River Runs Through It	Philippe Rousselot
1992 (65th)	Hoffa	Stephen H. Burum
1992 (65th)	Howards End	Tony Pierce-Roberts
1992 (65th)	The Lover	Robert Fraisse
1992 (65th)	Unforgiven	Jack N. Green
1993 (66th)	Schindler's List	Janusz Kamiński
1993 (66th)	Farewell My Concubine	Gu Changwei
1993 (66th)	The Fugitive	Michael Chapman
1993 (66th)	The Piano	Stuart Dryburgh
1993 (66th)	Searching for Bobby Fischer	Conrad L. Hall
1994 (67th)	Legends of the Fall	John Toll
1994 (67th)	Forrest Gump	Don Burgess
1994 (67th)	The Shawshank Redemption	Roger Deakins
1994 (67th)	Three Colours: Red	Piotr Sobociński
1994 (67th)	Wyatt Earp	Owen Roizman
1995 (68th)	Braveheart	John Toll
1995 (68th)	Batman Forever	Stephen Goldblatt
1995 (68th)	A Little Princess	Emmanuel Lubezki
1995 (68th)	Sense and Sensibility	Michael Coulter
1995 (68th)	Shanghai Triad	Lü Yue
1996 (69th)	The English Patient	John Seale
1996 (69th)	Evita	Darius Khondji
1996 (69th)	Fargo	Roger Deakins
1996 (69th)	Fly Away Home	Caleb Deschanel
1996 (69th)	Michael Collins	Chris Menges
1997 (70th)	Titanic	Russell Carpenter
1997 (70th)	Amistad	Janusz Kamiński
1997 (70th)	Kundun	Roger Deakins
1997 (70th)	L.A. Confidential	Dante Spinotti
1997 (70th)	The Wings of the Dove	Eduardo Serra
1998 (71st)	Saving Private Ryan	Janusz Kamiński
1998 (71st)	A Civil Action	Conrad L. Hall
1998 (71st)	Elizabeth	Remi Adefarasin
1998 (71st)	Shakespeare in Love	Richard Greatrex
1998 (71st)	The Thin Red Line	John Toll
1999 (72nd)	American Beauty	Conrad L. Hall
1999 (72nd)	The End of the Affair	Roger Pratt
1999 (72nd)	The Insider	Dante Spinotti
1999 (72nd)	Sleepy Hollow	Emmanuel Lubezki
1999 (72nd)	Snow Falling on Cedars	Robert Richardson

=== 2000s ===
Year	Film	Nominees
2000 (73rd)	Crouching Tiger, Hidden Dragon	Peter Pau
2000 (73rd)	Gladiator	John Mathieson
2000 (73rd)	Malèna	Lajos Koltai
2000 (73rd)	O Brother, Where Art Thou?	Roger Deakins
2000 (73rd)	The Patriot	Caleb Deschanel
2001 (74th)	The Lord of the Rings: The Fellowship of the Ring	Andrew Lesnie
2001 (74th)	Amélie	Bruno Delbonnel
2001 (74th)	Black Hawk Down	Sławomir Idziak
2001 (74th)	The Man Who Wasn't There	Roger Deakins
2001 (74th)	Moulin Rouge!	Donald McAlpine
2002 (75th)	Road to Perdition	Conrad L. Hall (posthumously)
2002 (75th)	Chicago	Dion Beebe
2002 (75th)	Far from Heaven	Edward Lachman
2002 (75th)	Gangs of New York	Michael Ballhaus
2002 (75th)	The Pianist	Paweł Edelman
2003 (76th)	Master and Commander: The Far Side of the World	Russell Boyd
2003 (76th)	City of God	César Charlone
2003 (76th)	Cold Mountain	John Seale
2003 (76th)	Girl with a Pearl Earring	Eduardo Serra
2003 (76th)	Seabiscuit	John Schwartzman
2004 (77th)	The Aviator	Robert Richardson
2004 (77th)	House of Flying Daggers	Zhao Xiaoding
2004 (77th)	The Passion of the Christ	Caleb Deschanel
2004 (77th)	The Phantom of the Opera	John Mathieson
2004 (77th)	A Very Long Engagement	Bruno Delbonnel
2005 (78th)	Memoirs of a Geisha	Dion Beebe
2005 (78th)	Batman Begins	Wally Pfister
2005 (78th)	Brokeback Mountain	Rodrigo Prieto
2005 (78th)	Good Night, and Good Luck	Robert Elswit
2005 (78th)	The New World	Emmanuel Lubezki
2006 (79th)	Pan's Labyrinth	Guillermo Navarro
2006 (79th)	The Black Dahlia	Vilmos Zsigmond
2006 (79th)	Children of Men	Emmanuel Lubezki
2006 (79th)	The Illusionist	Dick Pope
2006 (79th)	The Prestige	Wally Pfister
2007 (80th)	There Will Be Blood	Robert Elswit
2007 (80th)	The Assassination of Jesse James by the Coward Robert Ford	Roger Deakins
2007 (80th)	Atonement	Seamus McGarvey
2007 (80th)	The Diving Bell and the Butterfly	Janusz Kamiński
2007 (80th)	No Country for Old Men	Roger Deakins
2008 (81st)	Slumdog Millionaire	Anthony Dod Mantle
2008 (81st)	Changeling	Tom Stern
2008 (81st)	The Curious Case of Benjamin Button	Claudio Miranda
2008 (81st)	The Dark Knight	Wally Pfister
2008 (81st)	The Reader	Roger Deakins and Chris Menges
2009 (82nd)	Avatar	Mauro Fiore
2009 (82nd)	Harry Potter and the Half-Blood Prince	Bruno Delbonnel
2009 (82nd)	The Hurt Locker	Barry Ackroyd
2009 (82nd)	Inglourious Basterds	Robert Richardson
2009 (82nd)	The White Ribbon	Christian Berger

=== 2010s ===
Year	Film	Nominees
2010 (83rd)	Inception	Wally Pfister
2010 (83rd)	Black Swan	Matthew Libatique
2010 (83rd)	The King's Speech	Danny Cohen
2010 (83rd)	The Social Network	Jeff Cronenweth
2010 (83rd)	True Grit	Roger Deakins
2011 (84th)	Hugo	Robert Richardson
2011 (84th)	The Artist	Guillaume Schiffman
2011 (84th)	The Girl with the Dragon Tattoo	Jeff Cronenweth
2011 (84th)	The Tree of Life	Emmanuel Lubezki
2011 (84th)	War Horse	Janusz Kamiński
2012 (85th)	Life of Pi	Claudio Miranda
2012 (85th)	Anna Karenina	Seamus McGarvey
2012 (85th)	Django Unchained	Robert Richardson
2012 (85th)	Lincoln	Janusz Kamiński
2012 (85th)	Skyfall	Roger Deakins
2013 (86th)	Gravity	Emmanuel Lubezki
2013 (86th)	The Grandmaster	Philippe Le Sourd
2013 (86th)	Inside Llewyn Davis	Bruno Delbonnel
2013 (86th)	Nebraska	Phedon Papamichael
2013 (86th)	Prisoners	Roger Deakins
2014 (87th)	Birdman or (The Unexpected Virtue of Ignorance)	Emmanuel Lubezki
2014 (87th)	The Grand Budapest Hotel	Robert Yeoman
2014 (87th)	Ida	Łukasz Żal and Ryszard Lenczewski
2014 (87th)	Mr. Turner	Dick Pope
2014 (87th)	Unbroken	Roger Deakins
2015 (88th)	The Revenant	Emmanuel Lubezki
2015 (88th)	Carol	Edward Lachman
2015 (88th)	The Hateful Eight	Robert Richardson
2015 (88th)	Mad Max: Fury Road	John Seale
2015 (88th)	Sicario	Roger Deakins
2016 (89th)	La La Land	Linus Sandgren
2016 (89th)	Arrival	Bradford Young
2016 (89th)	Lion	Greig Fraser
2016 (89th)	Moonlight	James Laxton
2016 (89th)	Silence	Rodrigo Prieto
2017 (90th)	Blade Runner 2049	Roger Deakins
2017 (90th)	Darkest Hour	Bruno Delbonnel
2017 (90th)	Dunkirk	Hoyte van Hoytema
2017 (90th)	Mudbound	Rachel Morrison
2017 (90th)	The Shape of Water	Dan Laustsen
2018 (91st)	Roma	Alfonso Cuarón
2018 (91st)	Cold War	Łukasz Żal
2018 (91st)	The Favourite	Robbie Ryan
2018 (91st)	Never Look Away	Caleb Deschanel
2018 (91st)	A Star Is Born	Matthew Libatique
2019 (92nd)	1917	Roger Deakins
2019 (92nd)	The Irishman	Rodrigo Prieto
2019 (92nd)	Joker	Lawrence Sher
2019 (92nd)	The Lighthouse	Jarin Blaschke
2019 (92nd)	Once Upon a Time in Hollywood	Robert Richardson

=== 2020s ===
Year	Film	Nominees
2020/21 (93rd)	Mank	Erik Messerschmidt
2020/21 (93rd)	Judas and the Black Messiah	Sean Bobbitt
2020/21 (93rd)	News of the World	Dariusz Wolski
2020/21 (93rd)	Nomadland	Joshua James Richards
2020/21 (93rd)	The Trial of the Chicago 7	Phedon Papamichael
2021 (94th)	Dune	Greig Fraser
2021 (94th)	Nightmare Alley	Dan Laustsen
2021 (94th)	The Power of the Dog	Ari Wegner
2021 (94th)	The Tragedy of Macbeth	Bruno Delbonnel
2021 (94th)	West Side Story	Janusz Kamiński
2022 (95th)	All Quiet on the Western Front	James Friend
2022 (95th)	Bardo, False Chronicle of a Handful of Truths	Darius Khondji
2022 (95th)	Elvis	Mandy Walker
2022 (95th)	Empire of Light	Roger Deakins
2022 (95th)	Tár	Florian Hoffmeister
2023 (96th)	Oppenheimer	Hoyte van Hoytema
2023 (96th)	El Conde	Edward Lachman
2023 (96th)	Killers of the Flower Moon	Rodrigo Prieto
2023 (96th)	Maestro	Matthew Libatique
2023 (96th)	Poor Things	Robbie Ryan
2024 (97th)	The Brutalist	Lol Crawley
2024 (97th)	Dune: Part Two	Greig Fraser
2024 (97th)	Emilia Pérez	Paul Guilhaume
2024 (97th)	Maria	Edward Lachman
2024 (97th)	Nosferatu	Jarin Blaschke
2025 (98th)	Sinners	Autumn Durald Arkapaw
2025 (98th)	Frankenstein	Dan Laustsen
2025 (98th)	Marty Supreme	Darius Khondji
2025 (98th)	One Battle After Another	Michael Bauman
2025 (98th)	Train Dreams	Adolpho Veloso

== Shortlisted finalists ==
Finalists for Best Cinematography were selected by branch members, who voted for ten finalists which were screened to determine the five nominees.

Year	Finalists	Ref
1957	Boy on a Dolphin, Gunfight at the OK Corral, Les Girls, Pal Joey, Seven Wonders of the World	
1965	Black-and-White: The Bedford Incident, The Pawnbroker, Rapture, Sylvia, Synanon; Color: The Flight of the Phoenix, Harlow, The Pleasure Seekers, The Sandpiper, Von Ryan's Express	
1966	Black-and-White: Clouds Over Israel, Dear John, Lord Love a Duck, Mister Buddwing, The Shop on Main Street; Color: The Bible: In the Beginning..., Grand Prix, How to Steal a Million, The Oscar, The Russians Are Coming the Russians Are Coming	
1967	Barefoot in the Park, Guess Who's Coming to Dinner, In the Heat of the Night, The Taming of the Shrew, Thoroughly Modern Millie	
1968	The Boston Strangler, The Lion in Winter, Planet of the Apes, The Stalking Moon, 2001: A Space Odyssey	
1969	Gaily, Gaily, Goodbye, Mr. Chips, Paint Your Wagon, True Grit, The Wild Bunch	
1970	The Great White Hope, The Hawaiians, M*A*S*H, The Molly Maguires, Scrooge	
1971	The African Elephant, The Andromeda Strain, The Conformist, Mary, Queen of Scots, McCabe & Mrs. Miller	
1972	Avanti!, The Culpepper Cattle Co., Deliverance, Glass Houses, The Godfather	
1973	American Graffiti, Cinderella Liberty, Jesus Christ Superstar, Lost Horizon, Siddhartha	
1974	The Godfather Part II, Harry and Tonto, The Island at the Top of the World, The Tamarind Seed, The Three Musketeers	
1975	Dog Day Afternoon, Farewell, My Lovely, Ride a Wild Pony, The Sunshine Boys, Three Days of the Condor	
1976	Birch Interval, Family Plot, Fellini's Casanova, The Incredible Sarah, Marathon Man	
1977	Exorcist II: The Heretic, The Goodbye Girl, I Never Promised You a Rose Garden, 1900, Star Wars	
1978	Death on the Nile, The Duellists, Grease, Revenge of the Pink Panther, Who'll Stop the Rain	
1979	The Electric Horseman, Escape from Alcatraz, The Rose, The Runner Stumbles, 10	
2025	Ballad of a Small Player, Bugonia, Die My Love, F1, Hamnet, Nouvelle Vague, Sentimental Value, Sirāt, Song Sung Blue, Sound of Falling, Wicked: For Good	

== Multiple awards and nominations ==
Awards	Nominations	Recipient
4	18	Leon Shamroy
4	10	Joseph Ruttenberg
3	16	Robert Surtees
3	10	Conrad L. Hall
3	10	Robert Richardson
3	8	Emmanuel Lubezki
3	7	Arthur C. Miller
3	5	Freddie Young
3	4	Vittorio Storaro
3	3	Winton C. Hoch
2	16	Roger Deakins
2	14	Harry Stradling
2	10	James Wong Howe
2	8	Ray Rennahan
2	7	Janusz Kamiński
2	6	Charles Rosher
2	5	Burnett Guffey
2	5	Haskell Wexler
2	4	William C. Mellor
2	4	Chris Menges
2	4	Geoffrey Unsworth
2	3	Hal Mohr
2	3	Sven Nykvist
2	3	John Toll
2	2	Freddie Francis

Awards	Nominations	Recipient
1	18	Charles Lang
1	10	William V. Skall
1	9	W. Howard Greene
1	9	Victor Milner
1	8	George Barnes
1	8	Joseph LaShelle
1	8	Ernest Laszlo
1	7	Daniel L. Fapp
1	7	Tony Gaudio
1	7	Ernest Haller
1	7	Milton Krasner
1	6	Harold Rosson
1	6	Gregg Toland
1	5	John Seale
1	5	Joseph Valentine
1	4	Néstor Almendros
1	4	Robert Burks
1	4	William Daniels
1	4	Allen M. Davey
1	4	Lee Garmes
1	4	Loyal Griggs
1	4	Ernest Palmer
1	4	Wally Pfister
1	4	Leonard Smith
1	4	Karl Struss
1	4	Vilmos Zsigmond
1	3	Jack Cardiff
1	3	Greig Fraser
1	3	Karl Freund
1	3	Fred J. Koenekamp
1	3	Sam Leavitt
1	3	Lionel Lindon
1	3	Oswald Morris
1	3	Philippe Rousselot
1	3	Billy Williams
1	2	Arthur Arling
1	2	Dion Beebe
1	2	Joseph Biroc
1	2	Robert Elswit
1	2	Boris Kaufman
1	2	Oliver T. Marsh
1	2	Russell Metty
1	2	Claudio Miranda
1	2	Georges Périnal
1	2	Hoyte van Hoytema
1	2	Paul C. Vogel
1	1	John Alcott
1	1	Peter Biziou
1	1	Russell Boyd
1	1	Russell Carpenter
1	1	Lol Crawley
1	1	Alfonso Cuarón
1	1	Anthony Dod Mantle
1	1	Jack Hildyard
1	1	Robert Krasker
1	1	Andrew Lesnie
1	1	Erik Messerschmidt
1	1	Guillermo Navarro
1	1	Peter Pau
1	1	Linus Sandgren

Awards	Nominations	Recipient
0	13	George Folsey
0	7	Edward Cronjager
0	7	John F. Seitz
0	6	Caleb Deschanel
0	6	Bruno Delbonnel
0	6	Russell Harlan
0	5	Allen Daviau
0	5	Rudolph Maté
0	5	Franz Planer
0	5	Owen Roizman
0	4	Charles G. Clarke
0	4	William A. Fraker
0	4	Edward Lachman
0	4	Robert H. Planck
0	4	Rodrigo Prieto
0	4	Joseph Walker
0	3	Michael Ballhaus
0	3	Norbert Brodine
0	3	Arthur Edeson
0	3	Bert Glennon
0	3	Ray June
0	3	Matthew Libatique
0	3	Joseph MacDonald
0	3	Ted D. McCord
0	3	Sol Polito
0	3	Douglas Slocombe
0	3	William E. Snyder
0	2	Joseph August
0	2	Jarin Blaschke
0	2	Michael Chapman
0	2	William H. Clothier
0	2	Edward Colman
0	2	Stanley Cortez
0	2	Jeff Cronenweth
0	2	Stephen Goldblatt
0	2	Darius Khondji
0	2	Richard H. Kline
0	2	Philip H. Lathrop
0	2	Dan Laustsen
0	2	John Mathieson
0	2	Seamus McGarvey
0	2	Miroslav Ondříček
0	2	Phedon Papamichael
0	2	J. Peverell Marley
0	2	Don Peterman
0	2	Tony Pierce
0	2	Dick Pope
0	2	Robbie Ryan
0	2	Eduardo Serra
0	2	Dante Spinotti
0	2	Harry Stradling Jr.
0	2	Leo Tover
0	2	Sidney Wagner
0	2	Gordon Willis
0	2	Łukasz Żal

== See also ==
- BAFTA Award for Best Cinematography
- Independent Spirit Award for Best Cinematography
- Critics' Choice Movie Award for Best Cinematography
- American Society of Cinematographers Award for Outstanding Achievement in Cinematography in Theatrical Releases
- Satellite Award for Best Cinematography
- List of Academy Award–nominated films
