= 43rd Academy Awards =

- Date: April 15, 1971
- Site: Dorothy Chandler Pavilion, Los Angeles, California
- Produced by: Robert Wise
- Directed by: Richard Dunlap

Highlights
- Best Picture: Patton
- Most awards: Patton (7)
- Most nominations: Airport and Patton (10)

TV in the United States
- Network: NBC

The 43rd Academy Awards ceremony, presented by Academy of Motion Picture Arts and Sciences, was held on April 15, 1971, and took place at the Dorothy Chandler Pavilion to honor the best films of 1970. The Awards, without a host for the third consecutive year, were broadcast by NBC for the first time in 11 years.

George C. Scott, winner of Best Actor for Patton, became the first actor to decline an Oscar, having previously protested his nomination for Best Supporting Actor for The Hustler (1961) and quoted as saying that the Academy Awards were "a two-hour meat parade, a public display with contrived suspense for economic reasons". He also maintained that it was "degrading for actors to compete against one another". Co-star Karl Malden agreed, but felt that Scott could have made his denunciation more subtly.

With her Best Supporting Actress win for Airport, Helen Hayes became the first performer to win Oscars in both lead and supporting categories (having won Best Actress 39 years before for The Sin of Madelon Claudet). Her win set a record for the biggest gap between acting wins, subsequently broken by Katharine Hepburn (48 years between her first and last wins).

The documentary film Woodstock garnered three Oscar nominations, making it the most nominated documentary film in Oscar history (its record was later tied by Flee, 51 years later).

This was the only time since the 6th Academy Awards that all five nominees for Best Actress were first-time nominees, and was the last time that either lead acting category was entirely composed of new nominees until the 95th Academy Awards. It was also the first time since the 7th Academy Awards in which none of the nominees for the Best Actor had a previous nomination in that category.

As of 2025, this is the most recent ceremony in which the 4 highest-grossing films of the year were nominated for Best Picture (Love Story, Airport, M*A*S*H and Patton).

== Winners and nominees ==
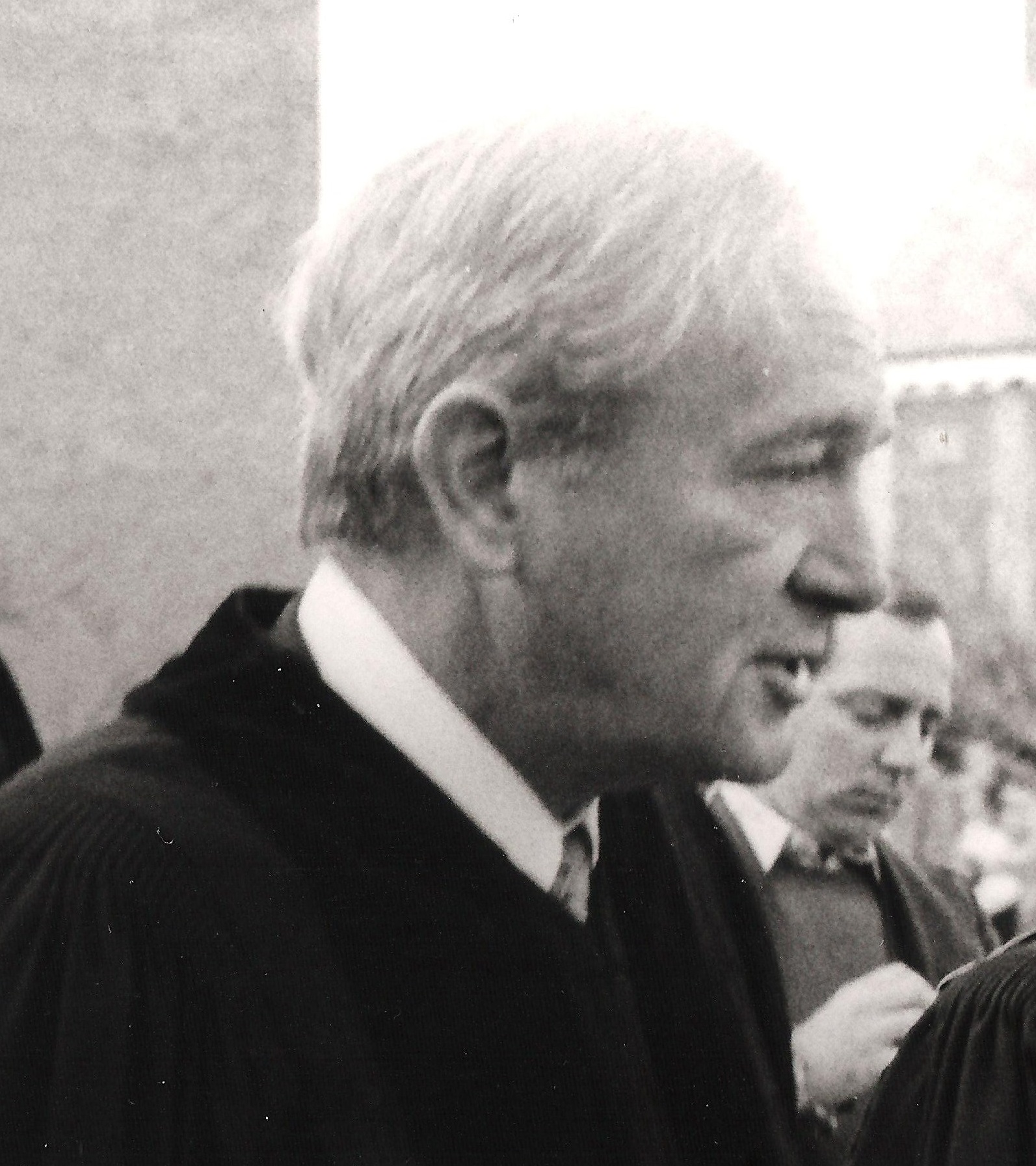
Franklin J. Schaffner, Best Director winner

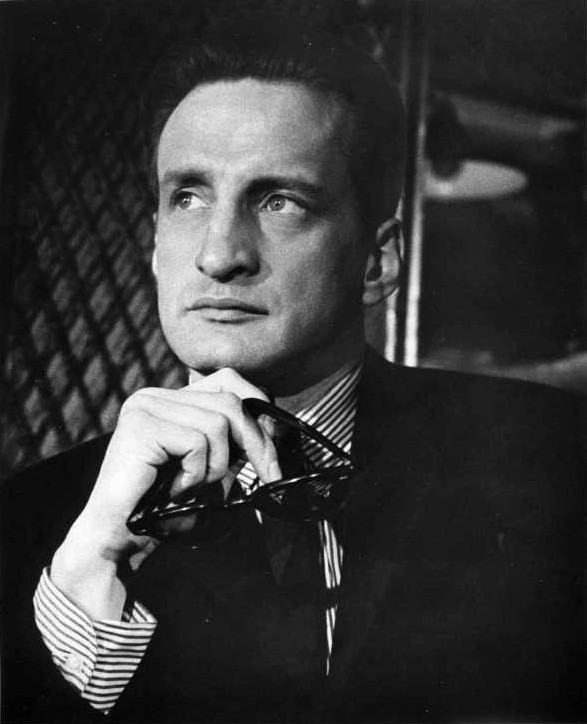
George C. Scott, Best Actor winner

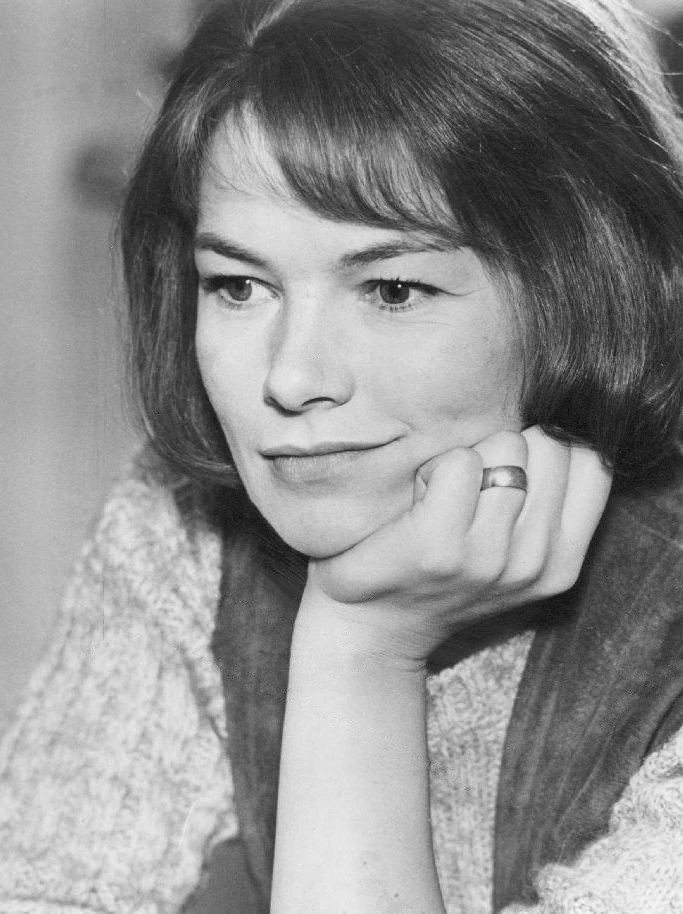
Glenda Jackson, Best Actress winner

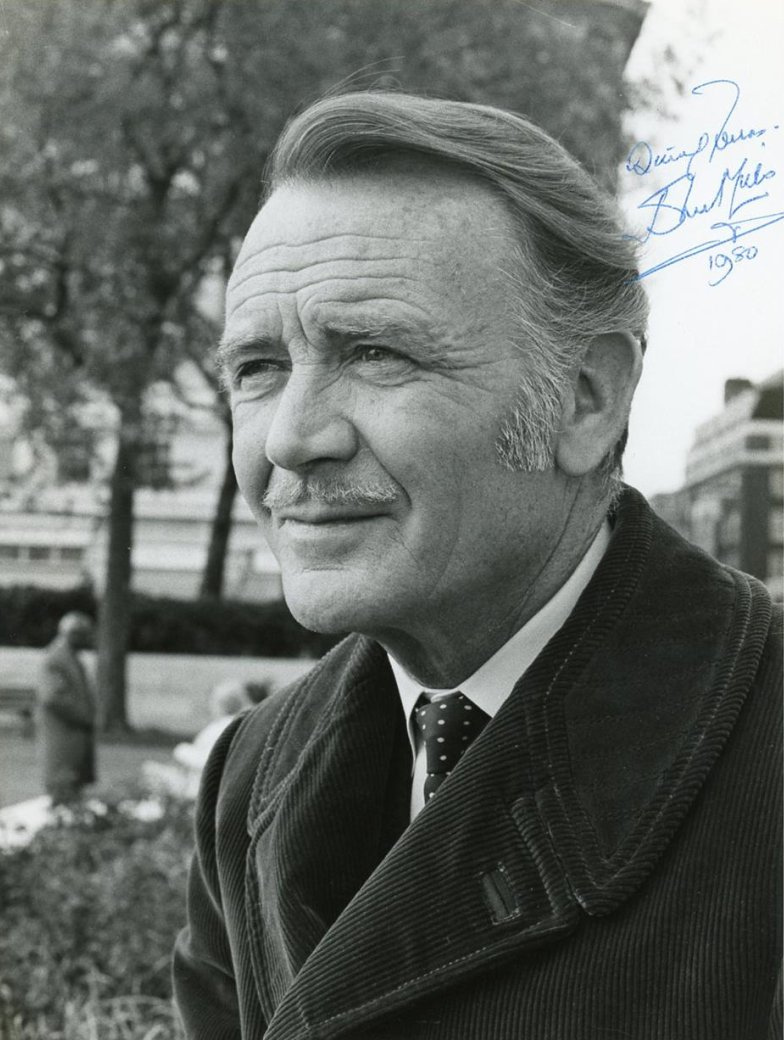
John Mills, Best Supporting Actor winner

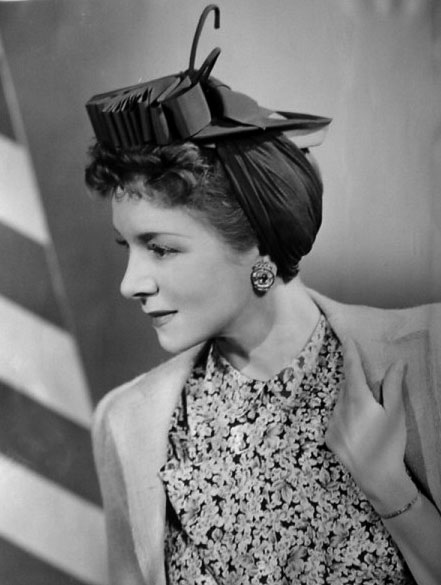
Helen Hayes, Best Supporting Actress winner

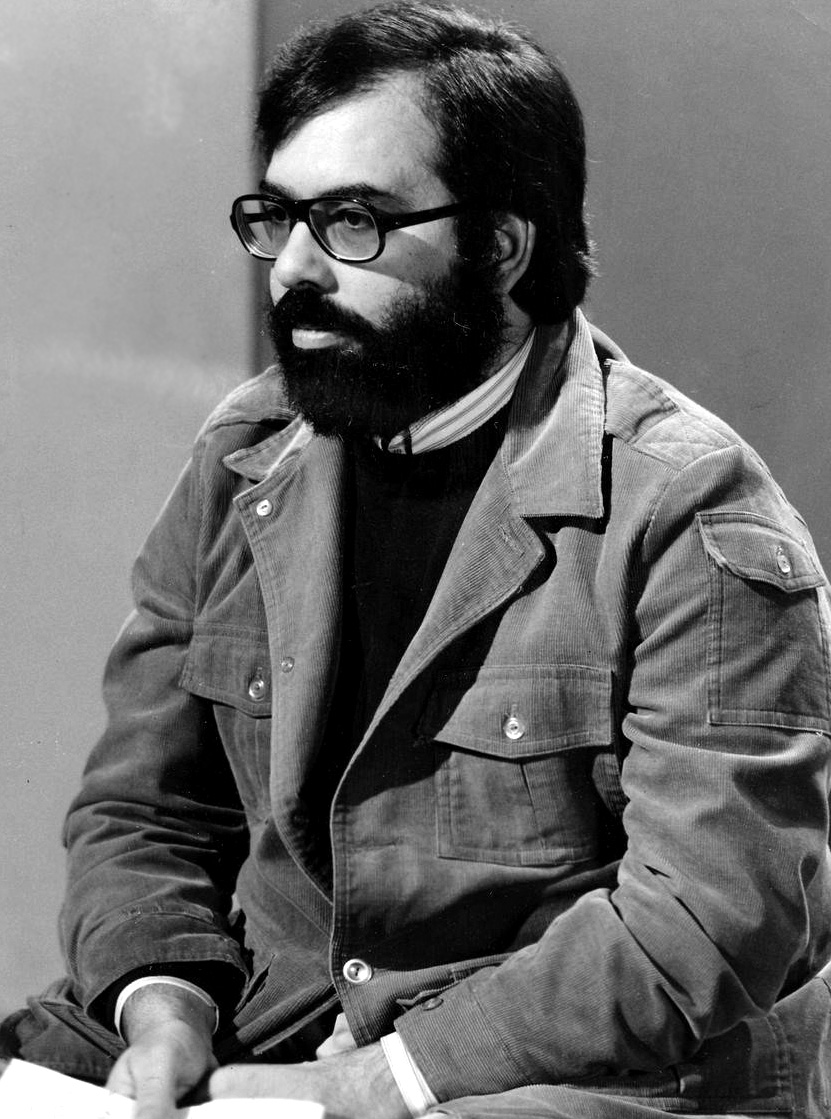
Francis Ford Coppola, Best Screenplay Based on Factual Material or Material Not Previously Published or Produced co-winner

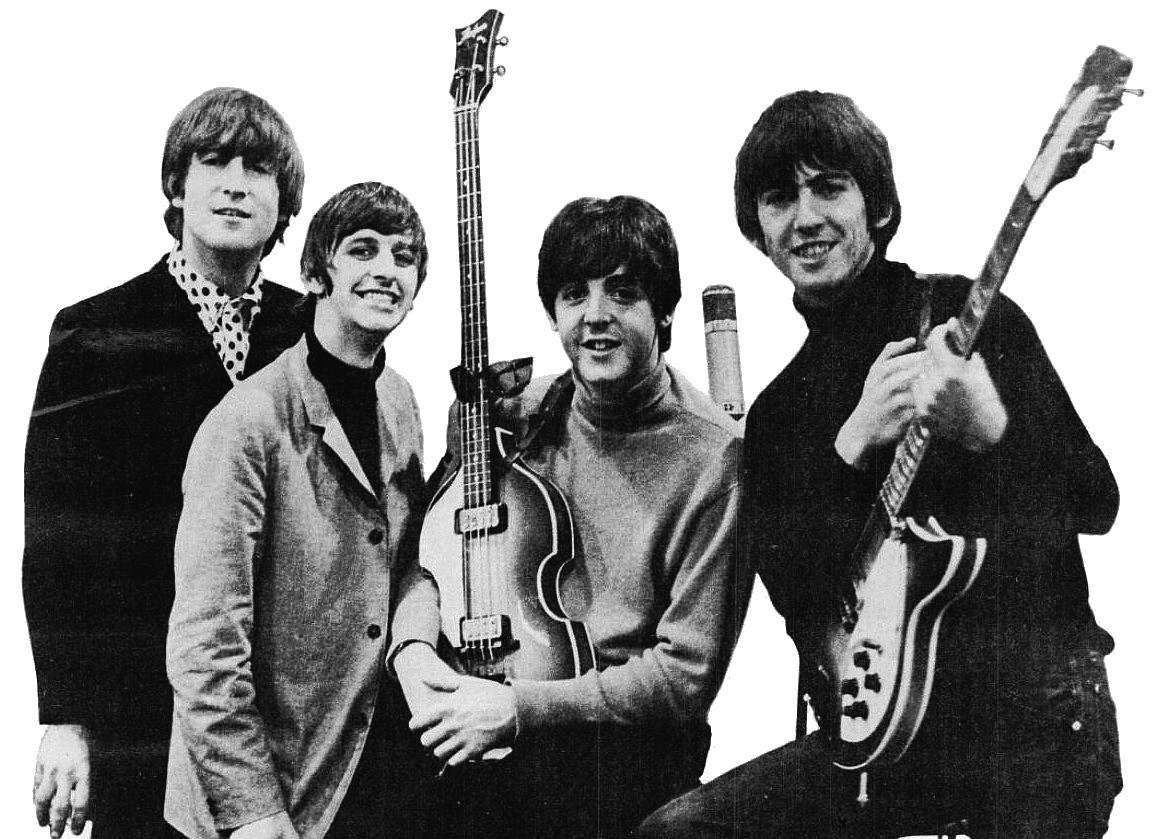
The Beatles, Best Original Song Score winners

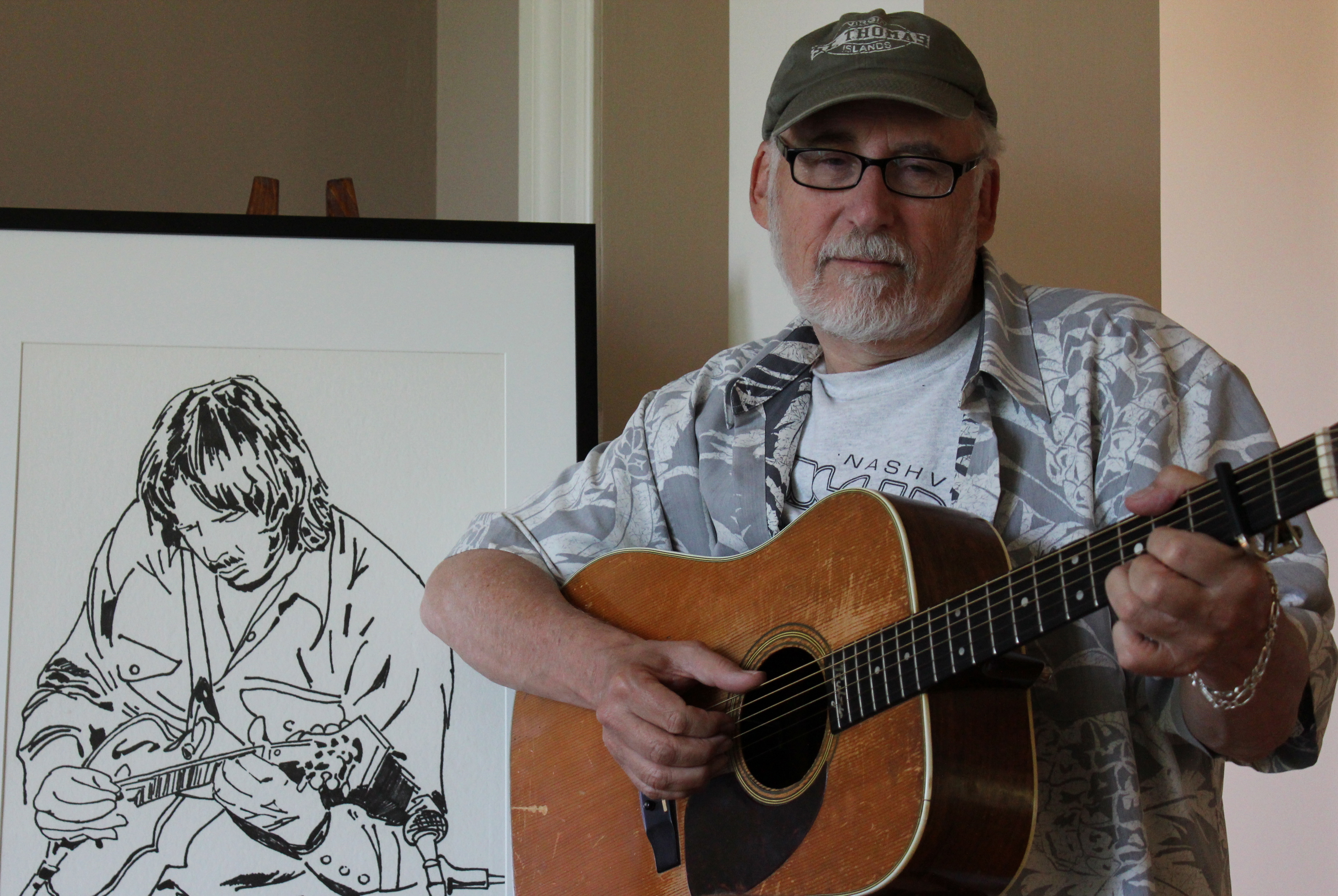
Robb Royer, Best Original Song co-winner

Nominees were announced on February 23, 1971. Winners are listed first and highlighted in boldface.

| **Best Picture**: **Patton – Frank McCarthy, producer**; Airport – Ross Hunter, producer; Five Easy Pieces – Bob Rafelson and Richard Wechsler, producers; Love Story – Howard G. Minsky, producer; M*A*S*H – Ingo Preminger, producer | **Best Directing**: **Franklin J. Schaffner – Patton**; Federico Fellini – Fellini Satyricon; Arthur Hiller – Love Story; Robert Altman – M*A*S*H; Ken Russell – Women in Love |
| **Best Actor**: **George C. Scott – Patton as General George S. Patton (declined)**; Melvyn Douglas – I Never Sang for My Father as Tom Garrison; James Earl Jones – The Great White Hope as Jack Jefferson; Jack Nicholson – Five Easy Pieces as Robert Eroica Dupea; Ryan O'Neal – Love Story as Oliver Barrett IV | **Best Actress**: **Glenda Jackson – Women in Love as Gudrun Brangwen**; Jane Alexander – The Great White Hope as Eleanor Backman; Ali MacGraw – Love Story as Jennifer "Jenny" Cavalleri; Sarah Miles – Ryan's Daughter as Rosy Ryan; Carrie Snodgress – Diary of a Mad Housewife as Bettina "Tina" Balser |
| **Best Actor in a Supporting Role**: **John Mills – Ryan's Daughter as Michael**; Richard S. Castellano – Lovers and Other Strangers as Frank Vecchio; Chief Dan George – Little Big Man as Old Lodge Skins; Gene Hackman – I Never Sang for My Father as Gene Garrison; John Marley – Love Story as Phil Cavalleri | **Best Actress in a Supporting Role**: **Helen Hayes – Airport as Ada Quonsett**; Karen Black – Five Easy Pieces as Rayette Dipesto; Lee Grant – The Landlord as Joyce Enders; Sally Kellerman – M*A*S*H as Margaret "Hot Lips" Houlihan; Maureen Stapleton – Airport as Inez Guerrero |
| **Best Writing (Story and Screenplay -- Based on Factual Material or Material Not Previously Published or Produced)**: **Patton – Francis Ford Coppola and Edmund H. North**; Five Easy Pieces – Screenplay by Adrien Joyce; Story by Bob Rafelson and Adrien Joyce; Joe – Norman Wexler; Love Story – Erich Segal; My Night at Maud's – Éric Rohmer | **Best Writing (Screenplay -- Based on Material from Another Medium)**: **M*A*S*H – Ring Lardner Jr. based on the novel by Richard Hooker**; Airport – George Seaton based on the novel by Arthur Hailey; I Never Sang for My Father – Robert Woodruff Anderson based on his play; Lovers and Other Strangers – Renée Taylor, Joseph Bologna and David Zelag Goodman based on the play by Joseph Bologna and Renée Taylor; Women in Love – Larry Kramer based on the novel by D. H. Lawrence |
| **Best Foreign Language Film**: **Investigation of a Citizen Above Suspicion (Italy)**; First Love (Switzerland); Hoa-Binh (France); Paix sur les champs (Belgium); Tristana (Spain) | **Best Documentary (Feature)**: **Woodstock – Bob Maurice**; Erinnerungen an die Zukunft – Harald Reinl (Released in English-language version under title "Chariots of the Gods?"); Jack Johnson – Jimmy Jacobs; King: A Filmed Record... Montgomery to Memphis – Ely Landau; Say Goodbye – David H. Vowell |
| **Best Documentary (Short Subject)**: **Interviews with My Lai Veterans – Joseph Strick**; The Gifts – Robert McBride; A Long Way from Nowhere – Bob Aller; Oisín – Patrick Carey and Vivien Carey; Time Is Running Out – Horst Dallmayr and Robert Ménégoz | **Best Short Subject (Live Action)**: **The Resurrection of Broncho Billy – John Longenecker**; Shut Up...I'm Crying – Robert Siegler; Sticky My Fingers...Fleet My Feet – John D. Hancock |
| **Best Short Subject (Cartoon)**: **Is It Always Right to Be Right? – Nick Bosustow**; The Further Adventures of Uncle Sam: Part Two – Robert Mitchell and Dale Case; The Shepherd – Cameron Guess | **Best Music (Original Score)**: **Love Story – Francis Lai**; Airport – Alfred Newman (posthumous nomination); Cromwell – Frank Cordell; Patton – Jerry Goldsmith; Sunflower – Henry Mancini |
| **Best Music (Original Song Score)**: **Let It Be – Music and Lyrics by The Beatles: John Lennon, Paul McCartney, George Harrison, and Ringo Starr**; The Baby Maker – Music by Fred Karlin; Lyrics by Tylwyth Kymry; A Boy Named Charlie Brown – Music by Rod McKuen and John Scott Trotter; Lyrics by Rod McKuen, Bill Melendez, and Al Shean; Adapted by Vince Guaraldi; Darling Lili – Music by Henry Mancini; Lyrics by Johnny Mercer; Scrooge – Music and Lyrics by Leslie Bricusse; Adapted by Ian Fraser and Herbert W. Spencer | **Best Music (Song -- Original for the Picture)**: **"For All We Know" – Lovers and Other Strangers; Music by Fred Karlin; Lyrics by Robb Royer (Robb Wilson) and Jimmy Griffin (Arthur James)**; "Pieces of Dreams" – Pieces of Dreams; Music by Michel Legrand; Lyrics by Alan Bergman and Marilyn Bergman; "Thank You Very Much" – Scrooge; Music and Lyrics by Leslie Bricusse; "Till Love Touches Your Life" – Madron; Music by Riz Ortolani; Lyrics by Arthur Hamilton; "Whistling Away the Dark" – Darling Lili; Music by Henry Mancini; Lyrics by Johnny Mercer |
| **Best Sound**: **Patton – Douglas Williams and Don Bassman**; Airport – Ronald Pierce and David H. Moriarty; Ryan's Daughter – Gordon McCallum and John Bramall; Tora! Tora! Tora! – Murray Spivack and Herman Lewis; Woodstock – Dan Wallin and Larry Johnson | **Best Art Direction**: **Patton – Art Direction: Urie McCleary and Gil Parrondo; Set Decoration: Antonio Mateos and Pierre-Louis Thévenet**; Airport – Art Direction: Alexander Golitzen and E. Preston Ames; Set Decoration: Jack D. Moore and Mickey S. Michaels; The Molly Maguires – Art Direction: Tambi Larsen; Set Decoration: Darrell Silvera; Scrooge – Art Direction: Terence Marsh and Bob Cartwright; Set Decoration: Pamela Cornell; Tora! Tora! Tora! – Art Direction: Jack Martin Smith, Yoshirō Muraki, Richard Day, and Taizoh Kawashima; Set Decoration: Walter M. Scott, Norman Rockett and Carl Biddiscombe |
| **Best Cinematography**: **Ryan's Daughter – Freddie Young**; Airport – Ernest Laszlo; Patton – Fred J. Koenekamp; Tora! Tora! Tora! – Charles F. Wheeler, Osamu Furuya, Shinsaku Himeda, and Masamichi Satoh; Women in Love – Billy Williams | **Best Costume Design**: **Cromwell – Vittorio Nino Novarese**; Airport – Edith Head; Darling Lili – Donald Brooks and Jack Bear; The Hawaiians – Bill Thomas; Scrooge – Margaret Furse |
| **Best Film Editing**: **Patton – Hugh S. Fowler**; Airport – Stuart Gilmore; M*A*S*H – Danford B. Greene; Tora! Tora! Tora! – James E. Newcom, Pembroke J. Herring, and Inoue Chikaya; Woodstock – Thelma Schoonmaker | **Best Special Visual Effects**: **Tora! Tora! Tora! – A. D. Flowers and L. B. Abbott**; Patton – Alex Weldon |

=== Honorary Awards ===
- To Lillian Gish for superlative artistry and for distinguished contribution to the progress of motion pictures.
- To Orson Welles for superlative artistry and versatility in the creation of motion pictures.

=== Jean Hersholt Humanitarian Award ===
- Frank Sinatra

=== Irving G. Thalberg Memorial Award ===
- Ingmar Bergman

=== Films with multiple wins and nominations ===
Films that received multiple nominations
| Nominations | Film |
|---|---|
| 10 | Airport |
| 10 | Patton |
| 7 | Love Story |
| 5 | M*A*S*H |
| 5 | Tora! Tora! Tora! |
| 4 | Five Easy Pieces |
| 4 | Ryan's Daughter |
| 4 | Scrooge |
| 4 | Women in Love |
| 3 | Darling Lili |
| 3 | I Never Sang for My Father |
| 3 | Lovers and Other Strangers |
| 3 | Woodstock |
| 2 | Cromwell |
| 2 | The Great White Hope |

Films that received multiple awards
| Wins | Film |
|---|---|
| 7 | Patton |
| 2 | Ryan's Daughter |

== Presenters and performers ==
The following individuals presented awards or performed musical numbers.

=== Presenters ===
| Name(s) | Role |
|---|---|
| Shirley Jones; John Marley | Presenters of the award for Best Sound |
| Maggie Smith | Presenter of the award for Best Supporting Actor |
| John Huston | Presenter of the Academy Honorary Award to Orson Welles |
| Gregory Peck | Presenter of the Jean Hersholt Humanitarian Award to Frank Sinatra |
| Melvyn Douglas | Presenter of the Academy Honorary Award to Lillian Gish |
| Gig Young | Presenter of the award for Best Supporting Actress |
| Richard Benjamin; Paula Prentiss | Presenters of the award for Best Documentary Short Subject and Best Documentary Feature |
| Jim Brown; Sally Kellerman | Presenters of the award for Best Short Subject – Cartoons and Best Live Action Short Subject |
| Merle Oberon; George Segal | Presenter of the award for Best Costume Design |
| Lola Falana; Juliet Prowse | Presenters of the award for Best Special Visual Effects |
| Geneviève Bujold; James Earl Jones | Presenters of the award for Best Cinematography and Best Film Editing |
| Petula Clark | Presenter of the award for Best Art Direction |
| Ricardo Montalbán; Jeanne Moreau | Presenters of the award for Best Foreign Language Film |
| Joan Blondell; Glen Campbell | Presenters of the award for Best Original Score and Best Original Song Score |
| Burt Lancaster | Presenter of the Irving G. Thalberg Memorial Award to Ingmar Bergman |
| Burt Bacharach; Angie Dickinson | Presenters of the award for Best Original Song |
| Janet Gaynor; Ryan O'Neal | Presenters of the award for Best Director |
| Harry Belafonte; Eva Marie Saint | Presenters of the award for Best Screenplay Based on Material from Another Medium |
| Sarah Miles; George Segal | Presenters of the award for Best Screenplay Based on Factual Material or Material Not Previously Produced or Published |
| Goldie Hawn | Presenter of the award for Best Actor |
| Walter Matthau | Presenter of the award for Best Actress |
| Steve McQueen | Presenter of the award for Best Picture |

=== Performers ===
| Name(s) | Role | Performed |
|---|---|---|
| Glen Campbell | Performer | "Pieces of Dreams" from Pieces of Dreams |
| Petula Clark | Performer | "For All We Know" from Lovers and Other Strangers |
| Petula Clark; Sally Kellerman; Burt Lancaster; Ricardo Montalbán | Performers | "Thank You Very Much" from Scrooge |
| Lola Falana | Performer | "Till Love Touches Your Life" from Madron |
| Shirley Jones | Performer | "Whistling Away the Dark" from Darling Lili |

== See also ==
- 28th Golden Globe Awards
- 1970 in film
- 13th Grammy Awards
- 22nd Primetime Emmy Awards
- 23rd Primetime Emmy Awards
- 24th British Academy Film Awards
- 25th Tony Awards
