= Whistling Away the Dark =

- 1970 US single

Single by Julie Andrews

from the album Darling Lili
- B-side: "Smile Away Each Rainy Day"
- Released: 1970
- Genre: Musical, show tune
- Length: 2:33
- Label: RCA
- Songwriters: Henry Mancini, Johnny Mercer

Julie Andrews singles chronology
"Don't Go in the Lion's Cage Tonight" (1967)	"Whistling Away the Dark" (1970)	"Feed the Birds" (1973)

"Whistling Away the Dark" is a song composed by Henry Mancini with lyrics by Johnny Mercer, written for the 1970 musical film Darling Lili starring Julie Andrews. The song was released as a single by RCA Records to promote the film and the album Julie Andrews / Henry Mancini Perform Music from the Film Score Darling Lili. Featured in the movie's opening scene, the waltz accompanies Andrews' performance amid wartime imagery, blending intimacy with broader themes of deception.

In 1971, the song won Best Original Song – Motion Picture at the 28th Golden Globe Awards, and was nominated for Best Song – Original for the Picture at the 43rd Academy Awards. The track remains one of Mancini and Mercer's most acclaimed collaborations.

== Overview ==
"Whistling Away the Dark" was released as a single by RCA Records in the same year together with "Smile Away Each Rainy Day" as a B-side (catalog numer: 47-9851), to promote the movie and the studio album Julie Andrews / Henry Mancini Perform Music from the Film Score Darling Lili. Although the songs on the cited album were not taken directly from the film's soundtrack, Mancini's arrangements closely resemble the film versions. "Whistling Away the Dark" appears in two different versions.

Featured prominently in the film's opening scene, the waltz "Whistling Away the Dark" accompanies Andrews' performance as her character, Lili, sings onstage amid wartime tensions. It contrasts intimate vulnerability with the film's broader themes of deception and genre-blending, underscored by Blake Edwards' direction, which intercuts Andrews' rendition with wartime imagery like zeppelins and submarines.

In her memoir Home Work: A Memoir of My Hollywood Years (2019), Andrews recounted that filming the song was both demanding and deeply rewarding. Director Blake Edwards, her husband at the time, envisioned the scene as a single continuous take, which required extensive rehearsals, special lighting effects, and highly disciplined camera work involving complex focus changes and cable-pulling. Andrews noted that she "danced with the camera", moving in sync with it and having to hit her marks precisely while lip-syncing flawlessly from beginning to end. Although the shoot took an entire day, Andrews described the result as "a beautiful piece of filmmaking on Blake's part".

== Critical reception ==
The song was featured in Record World's "Single Reviews: Four Star Picks" section. The publication highlighted their collaboration as an element of added appeal. The review described the track as having a "sweet sound". In its review of the Darling Lili soundtrack, Cashbox highlighted "Whistling Away the Dark" as a standout track. The song was described as a "pretty number" that recalls the earlier Mancini-Mercer waltz "Charade". The review noted that both Julie Andrews and Henry Mancini delivered the material effectively, and concluded with the expectation that the song "should be big".

In The Invisible Art of Film Music: A Comprehensive History, Laurence E. MacDonald praises Julie Andrews' rendition as a standout moment in both her career and Henry Mancini's compositions. He describes her performance as "beguiling", particularly for its emphasis on the lower register of her voice—a rare showcase at the time. MacDonald highlights the song's "wonderfully melancholy" tone and its Oscar-nominated quality, noting that it remains one of Mancini's finest works, enhanced by Johnny Mercer's lyrics. While he critiques the film's spy plot for weighing it down, he emphasizes how the music, especially this piece, elevates the production, calling it a brilliant collaboration between Andrews, Mancini, and Mercer.

In Henry Mancini: Reinventing Film Music, John Caps analyzes "Whistling Away the Dark" as a hauntingly beautiful waltz that stands out for its emotional depth and cinematic presentation. He highlights its melancholic E-minor melody—sadder than Mancini's "Charade"—and Johnny Mercer's poignant lyrics, which reflect heartache and longing. Caps also praises Blake Edwards' direction, particularly the intimate, single-take performance by Julie Andrews, where dreamy lighting and her solitary waltz amplify the song's wistful tone. According to the author, the abrupt shift from the song's tender ending to wartime chaos underscores its bittersweet impact, making it a defining moment in the film.

== Accolades ==
At the 28th Golden Globe Awards in 1971, "Whistling Away the Dark" won the award for Best Original Song – Motion Picture. The other nominees included "Ballad of Little Fauss and Big Halsey" from Little Fauss and Big Halsy, composed by Johnny Cash and Carl Perkins; "Till Love Touches Your Life" from Madron, by Shirley Bassey, Riz Ortolani and Arthur Hamilton; "Pieces of Dreams" from the film of the same name, by Johnny Mathis, Marvin Hamlisch, Alan and Marilyn Bergman; and "Thank You Very Much" from Scrooge, written by James Head and Leslie Bricusse.

In addition, it was nominated for the Academy Award for Best Song – Original for the Picture at the 43rd Oscars, held in 1971. The winning song that year was "For All We Know" from Lovers and Other Strangers, composed by Fred Karlin with lyrics by Jimmy Griffin and Robb Royer. Other nominees included "Till Love Touches Your Life" from Madron (music by Riz Ortolani, lyrics by Arthur Hamilton), "Pieces of Dreams" from the film of the same name (music by Michel Legrand, lyrics by Alan and Marilyn Bergman), and "Thank You Very Much" from Scrooge (music and lyrics by Leslie Bricusse).

Awards and nominations for "Thoroughly Modern Millie"
Year	Award	Category	Result	Ref.
1971	28th Golden Globe Awards	Best Original Song	Won	
1971	43rd Academy Awards	Best Original Song	Nominated	
