= Julie Andrews / Henry Mancini Perform Music from the Film Score Darling Lili =

Studio album by Julie Andrews, Henry Mancini
- Released: 1969
- Genre: Pop
- Label: RCA Victor

Julie Andrews chronology
Star! (1968)	Darling Lili (1969)	A Little Bit In Love (1970)

Singles from Julie Andrews / Henry Mancini Perform Music from the Film Score Darling Lili
- 1. "Whistling Away the Dark" Released: 1970; 2. "Darling Lili" Released: 1970

Julie Andrews / Henry Mancini Perform Music from the Film Score Darling Lili (later retitled simply as Darling Lili (Music from the Film Score)) is a studio album released in 1969 by RCA Victor featuring songs performed by Julie Andrews and composed by Henry Mancini with lyrics by Johnny Mercer. The album is based on the film Darling Lili, directed by Blake Edwards and starring Andrews and Rock Hudson. Rather than serving as a traditional soundtrack, the album was produced as a separate studio recording inspired by the film's score.

The project includes a selection of vocal and instrumental pieces that capture the World War I era atmosphere through orchestration and lyrical themes and continues the creative collaboration between Andrews, Mancini, and Mercer. The album was part of a larger promotional effort connected to the film's release, and expectations were high due to the past commercial success of similar musical ventures involving the same artists.

Upon release, the album was supported by singles and gained some recognition on the music charts. It was reviewed by contemporary music publications and maintained modest visibility during its initial run. Decades later, interest in the material led to expanded editions, featuring remastered tracks and previously unreleased content.

== Background and release ==
Released in 1969 by RCA Victor, the album includes songs from the Blake Edwards film Darling Lili. Despite its connection to the movie, it is not a traditional soundtrack but a separate studio recording of the film's music. The film Darling Lili, co-starring Rock Hudson, was an ambitious but troubled production. A hybrid of wartime melodrama and musical comedy, its lengthy production strained the long-standing partnership between Edwards and Mancini. Paramount Pictures later took control of the final edit, removing Edwards from the process—an experience that would inspire his later Hollywood satire S.O.B. (1981).

The album contains compositions reflective of the World War I era. The project marked a continuation of Mancini's collaboration with Edwards and featured contributions from renowned lyricist Johnny Mercer. RCA Records had significant commercial expectations for the album, banking on Julie Andrews' star power following the success of The Sound of Music soundtrack, which had sold over 12 million copies worldwide at the time. Mancini prioritized the project, canceling $150,000 worth of concert engagements, to dedicate himself entirely to composing the score.

In 2024, an expanded edition of the album was released by Quartet Records which included the original RCA album remastered, previously unreleased demos performed by Johnny Mercer, and Mancini’s complete instrumental underscore.

== Singles ==
The song "Whistling Away the Dark" was released as a single and received a favorable review from Record World magazine. In addition, it won the Best Original Song – Motion Picture at the 28th Golden Globe Awards, and was nominated for Best Song – Original for the Picture at the 43rd Academy Awards.

"Darling Lili"—performed by Henry Mancini, His Orchestra and Chorus—was released as a single (catalog number 47-9857), paired with "Love Theme from Sunflower (Loss of Love)" as the B-side. The song debuted on Billboard's Adult Contemporary chart on June 13, 1970, peaked at number 26, and remained on the chart for a total of six weeks.

== Critical reception ==
Billboard called it a "winning album" and commended Andrews' interpretation of tracks such as "I'll Give You Three Guesses" and "Smile Away Each Rainy Day".

Cash Box described the album as "appropriately reflective of a period when sentiment and a stiff-upper-lip went with war", referred to "Whistling Away the Dark" as a "pretty number", and noted that "both Miss Andrews and Mancini present the material winningly".

== Commercial performance ==
Julie Andrews / Henry Mancini Perform Music from the Film Score Darling Lili debuted on the Billboard 200 chart on August 1, 1970, at position #197. The album saw a modest rise, reaching its peak at #113 on August 8, 1970. Despite not breaking into the top 100, it managed to stay on the chart for a total of seven weeks.

== Track listing ==
No.	Title	Writer(s)	Performer(s)	Length
1.	"Overture"	Henry Mancini, Johnny Mercer	Chorus	4:02
2.	"Whistling Away the Dark"	Henry Mancini, Johnny Mercer	Julie Andrews	3:43
3.	"The Little Birds (Les P'tits Oiseaux)"	Henry Mancini, Johnny Mercer	Le Lycée Francais De Los Angeles Children's Choir	2:55
4.	"The Girl In No Man's Land"	Henry Mancini, Johnny Mercer	Chorus, Julie Andrews	3:32
5.	"Gypsy Violin"			3:16
6.	"I'll Give You Three Guesses"	Henry Mancini, Johnny Mercer	Chorus, Julie Andrews	3:32
7.	"Darling Lili"	Henry Mancini, Johnny Mercer	Chorus	2:47
8.	"Smile Away Each Rainy Day"	Henry Mancini, Johnny Mercer	Chorus, Julie Andrews	2:25
9.	"The Can-Can Cafe"			2:02
10.	"I'll Give You Three Guesses"	Henry Mancini, Johnny Mercer	Chorus, Julie Andrews	2:03
11.	"Skäl (Let's Have Another On Me)"			1:40
12.	"Your Good-Will Ambassador"	Henry Mancini, Johnny Mercer	Chorus	2:10
13.	"Whistling Away The Dark"	Henry Mancini, Johnny Mercer		3:40

== Personnel ==
Credits adapted from the liner notes of Julie Andrews / Henry Mancini Perform Music from the Film Score Darling Lili record.

- Orchestrated by Henry Mancini and His Orchestra
- Produced by Joe Reisman
- Scored by Henry Mancini
- Written by Henry Mancini, Johnny Mercer

== Charts ==
Weekly chart performance for Julie Andrews / Henry Mancini Perform Music from the Film Score Darling Lili
Chart (1969)	Peak position
U.S. Top LPs (Billboard)	113
U.S. Top 100 Albums (Cashbox)	70
U.S. 100 Top LP's (Record World)	73
