= Bramall =

Bramall may refer to:

People:

- Edwin Bramall, Baron Bramall (1923–2019) British field marshal
- John Bramall (1923–2000), English sound engineer

Other uses:

- Bramall Hall, a manor house in Greater Manchester, England
- Bramall Lane, a football stadium in Sheffield, England

== See also ==
- Bramhall
