= Robert Cartwright =

English art director

- Born: August 1930; Ludgershall, Wiltshire, England
- Occupation: Art director
- Years active: 1952–1991

Robert Cartwright (born August 1930) is an English art director. He was nominated for four Academy Awards (all shared) in the category Best Art Direction.

== Partial filmography ==
Academy Award nominations in bold

- **Becket** (1964) (nominated with John Bryan, Maurice Carter and Patrick McLoughlin)
- A Countess from Hong Kong (1967)
- **Scrooge** (1970) (with Terence Marsh and Pamela Cornell)
- The Devils (1971)
- **Mary, Queen of Scots** (1971) (with Terence Marsh and Peter Howitt)
- Follow Me! (1972)
- The Optimists of Nine Elms (1973)
- Hanover Street (1979)
- **The Elephant Man** (1980) (with Stuart Craig and Hugh Scaife)
- Five Days One Summer (1982)
- Lifeforce (1985)
