= Deadly Harvest =

Deadly Harvest may refer to:

- Deadly Harvest (1972 film), American TV movie directed by Michael O'Herlihy and produced by CBS (1972)
- Deadly Harvest (1977 film), Canadian science-fiction film directed by Timothy Bond(1977)
