= Richard Boone =

American actor (1917–1981)

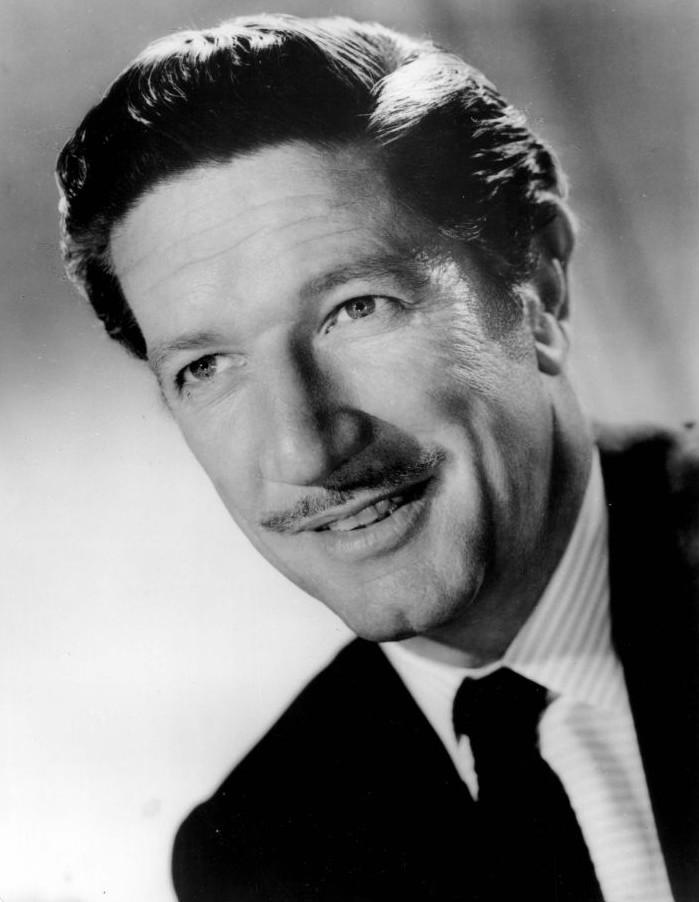
- Boone in 1959
- Born: Richard Allen Boone; June 18, 1917; Los Angeles, California, U.S.
- Died: January 10, 1981 (aged 63); St. Augustine, Florida, U.S.
- Occupation: Actor
- Years active: 1947–1981
- Spouses: Jane H. Hopper (m. 1937; div. 1940) Mimi Kelly (m. 1949; div. 1950) Claire McAloon (m. 1951)
- Children: 1
- Military career
- Allegiance: United States of America
- Branch: United States Navy
- Service years: 1941–1945
- Rank: Petty officer first class
- Conflicts: World War II

Richard Allen Boone (June 18, 1917 – January 10, 1981) was an American actor who starred in over 50 films and was notable for his roles in Westerns, including a starring role in the television series Have Gun – Will Travel.

== Background ==
Boone was born in Los Angeles the middle child of Cecile (née Beckerman) and Kirk E. Boone, a corporate lawyer and great-great-great-great-grandson of Squire Boone, frontiersman Daniel Boone's brother. His mother was Jewish, the daughter of immigrants from Russia.

Richard Boone graduated from Hoover High School in Glendale, California. He attended Stanford University in Palo Alto, California, where he was a member of Theta Xi fraternity. He dropped out of Stanford prior to graduation and then worked as an oil rigger, bartender, painter, and writer. In 1941, Boone joined the United States Navy and served on three ships in the Pacific during World War II, seeing combat as an aviation ordnanceman, aircrewman, and tail gunner on Grumman TBF Avenger torpedo bombers, and ended his service with the rank of petty officer first class.

== Acting career ==
=== Instruction ===
In his youth, Boone had attended the San Diego Army and Navy Academy in Carlsbad, California, where he was introduced to theater under the tutelage of Virginia Atkinson. After the war, Boone used the G.I. Bill to study acting at the Actors Studio in Manhattan, New York.

=== Broadway ===
"Serious" and "methodical", Boone debuted on the Broadway theatrical scene in 1947 with Medea, starring Judith Anderson and John Gielgud; it ran for 214 performances. Next, he was in a production of Macbeth (1948). Boone appeared in a short-lived TV series based on the play The Front Page (1949–50), and in Actors Studio and Suspense, two anthology series. He returned to Broadway in The Man (1950), directed by Martin Ritt, with Dorothy Gish; it ran for 92 performances.

Elia Kazan used Boone to feed lines to an actress for a film screen-test done for director Lewis Milestone. Milestone was not impressed with the actress, but he was impressed enough with Boone's voice to summon him to Hollywood, where he was given a seven-year contract with Fox.

=== 20th Century Fox ===
In 1950, Boone made his screen debut as a Marine officer in Milestone's Halls of Montezuma (1951). Fox used him in military parts in Call Me Mister (1951) and The Desert Fox: The Story of Rommel (1951). He had bigger roles in Red Skies of Montana (1952), Return of the Texan (1952), Kangaroo (1952; directed by Milestone), and Way of a Gaucho (1952). His role in Kangaroo was greatly expanded from what it was in the original script.

Elia Kazan directed him in Man on a Tightrope (1953). He had solid parts in Vicki (1953) and City of Bad Men (1953). In 1953, he played Pontius Pilate in The Robe, the first Cinemascope film. He had only one scene in the film, in which he gives instructions to Richard Burton, who plays the centurion ordered to crucify Christ. Boone also appeared in the second Cinemascope film, Beneath the 12-Mile Reef (1953). Boone made two films for Panoramic, which distributed through Fox: The Siege at Red River (1954) and The Raid (1954). He then left the studio, breaking his contract.

=== Medic ===
During the filming of Halls of Montezuma, he befriended Jack Webb, who was then producing and starring in Dragnet. Boone appeared in the film version of Dragnet (1954). Webb was preparing a series about a doctor for NBC. From 1954–56, Boone became a familiar face in the lead role of that medical drama, titled Medic, and in 1955 received an Emmy nomination for Best Actor Starring in a Regular Series.

While on Medic, Boone continued to appear in films and guest-star on television shows. He was cast in Westerns such as Ten Wanted Men (1955) with Randolph Scott, Man Without a Star (1955) with Kirk Douglas, Robbers' Roost (1955) with George Montgomery, Battle Stations (1955) with John Lund, Star in the Dust (1956) with John Agar, and Away All Boats (1956) with Jeff Chandler. Boone also guest-starred on General Electric Theater, Matinee Theatre (a production of Wuthering Heights), Lux Video Theatre, The Ford Television Theatre, Studio One in Hollywood, and Climax!

Boone had one of his best roles in The Tall T (1957) with Randolph Scott. He co-starred with Eleanor Parker in Lizzie (1957) and was a villain in The Garment Jungle (1957).

=== Have Gun – Will Travel ===
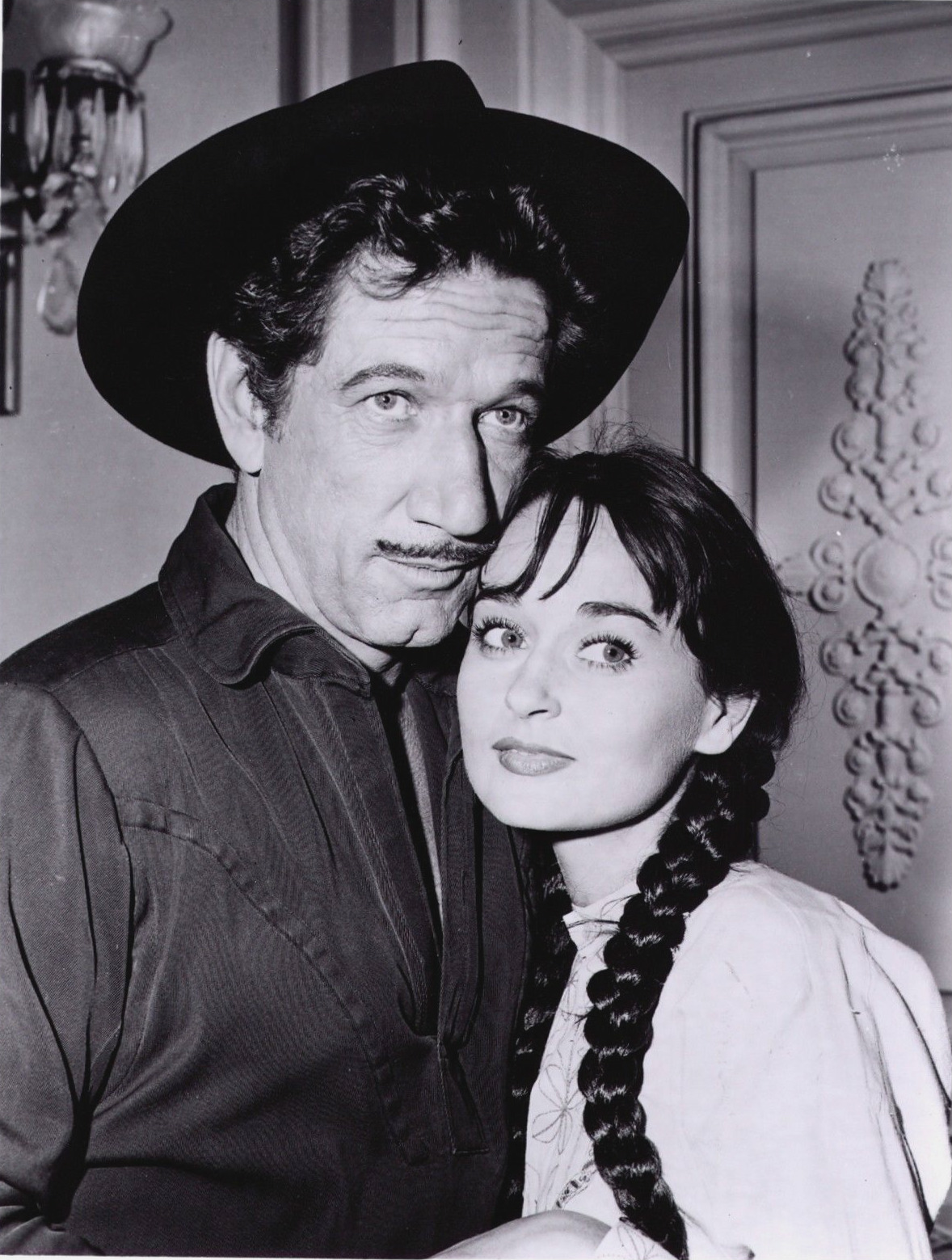
Boone and Roxane Berard, who guested on Have Gun – Will Travel three times

Boone's next television series, Have Gun – Will Travel, made him a national star because of his role as Paladin, the intelligent and sophisticated, but tough gun-for-hire in the late 19th-century American West. The show had first been offered to actor Randolph Scott, who turned it down and gave the script to Boone while they were making Ten Wanted Men. The show ran from 1957 to 1963, with Boone receiving more Emmy nominations in 1959 and 1960.

During the show's run, Boone starred in the film I Bury the Living (1958) and appeared on Broadway in 1959, starring as Abraham Lincoln in The Rivalry, which ran for 81 performances.

He occasionally did other acting appearances such as episodes of Playhouse 90 and The United States Steel Hour and TV movie The Right Man (1960). He had a cameo as Sam Houston in The Alamo (1960), a starring role in A Thunder of Drums (1961) and narrated a TV version of John Brown's Body. Boone was an occasional guest panelist and also a mystery guest on What's My Line?, the Sunday-night CBS-TV quiz show. On that show, he talked with host John Charles Daly about their days working together on the TV show The Front Page.

=== The Richard Boone Show ===
Boone had his own television anthology, The Richard Boone Show. Although it aired only from 1963 to 1964, he received his fourth Emmy nomination for it in 1964 along with The Danny Kaye Show and The Dick Van Dyke Show. The Richard Boone Show won a Golden Globe for Best Show in 1964.

=== Hawaii ===
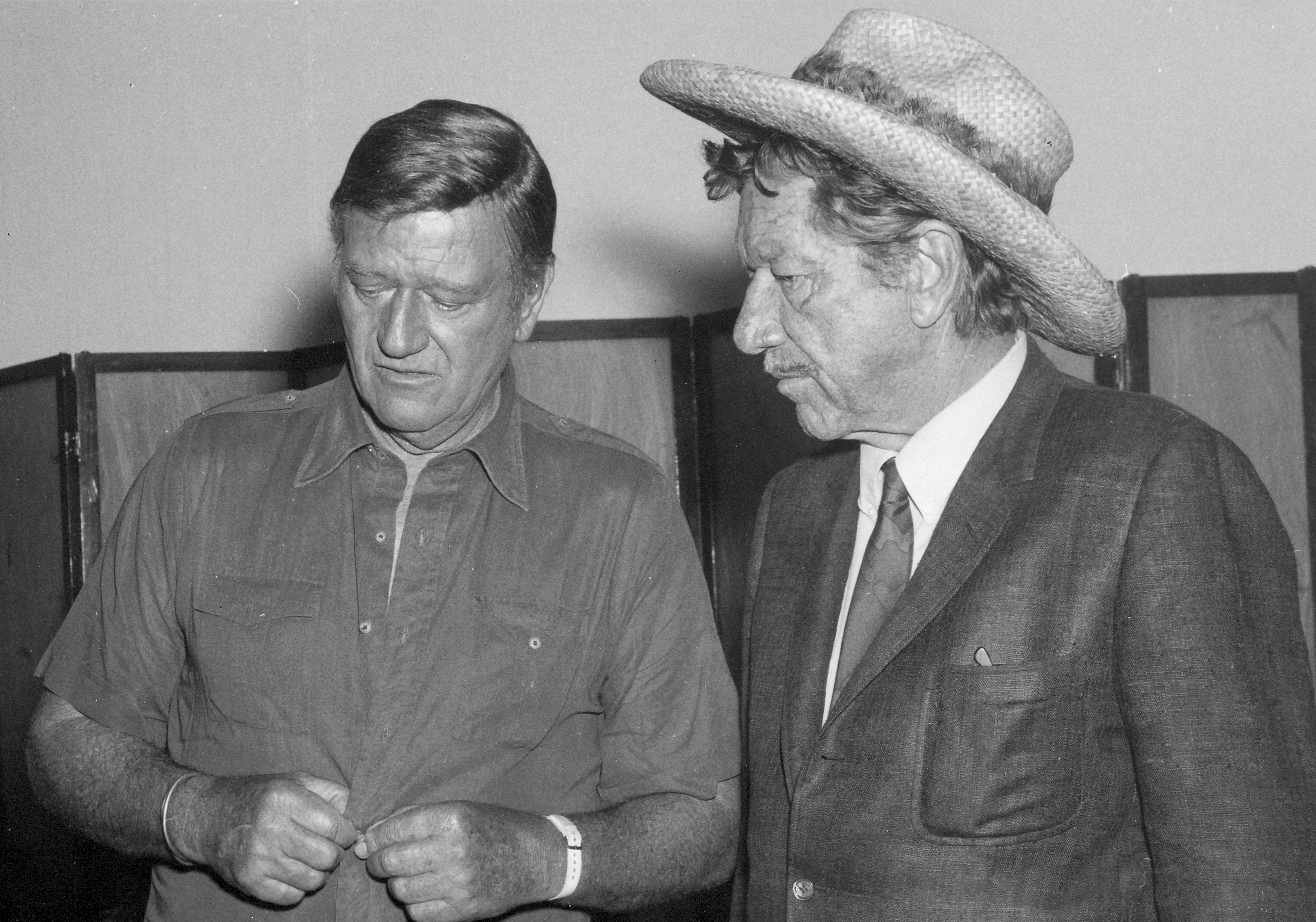
John Wayne and Boone at the premiere of Big Jake, 1971

After the end of the run of his weekly show, Boone and his family moved to Honolulu, Hawaii. He returned to the mainland to appear in films including Rio Conchos (1964), The War Lord (1965) with Charlton Heston, Hombre (1967) with Paul Newman, and an episode of Cimarron Strip. The latter was the first time he guest-starred on someone else's show and he did it as a favor for the director, friend Lamont Johnson. "It's harder and harder to do your best work on TV," he said.

In 1965, he came in third in the Laurel Award for Rio Conchos in Best Action Performance; Sean Connery won first place with Goldfinger and Burt Lancaster won second place with The Train.

While he was living on Oahu, Boone helped persuade Leonard Freeman to film Hawaii Five-O exclusively in Hawaii. Prior to that, Freeman had planned to do "establishing" location shots in Hawaii, but principal production in Southern California. Boone and others convinced Freeman that the islands could offer all necessary support for a major TV series and would provide an authenticity otherwise unobtainable. Freeman, impressed by Boone's love of Hawaii, offered him the role of Steve McGarrett; Boone turned it down, however, and the role went to Jack Lord, who shared Boone's enthusiasm for the state, which Freeman considered vital. Lord had appeared alongside Boone in the first episode of Have Gun – Will Travel, titled "Three Bells to Perdido".

At the time, Boone had shot a pilot for CBS called Kona Coast (1968), which he hoped CBS would adopt as a series ("I really don't want to do another series," he said "but I've been battling for three years to get production going in Hawaii and if a series will do it, I'll do it."), but the network went instead only with Hawaii Five-O. Kona Coast – which Boone co produced – was released theatrically.

=== Films ===
Boone then focused on films: The Night of the Following Day (1969) with Marlon Brando, The Arrangement (1969) with Douglas for Elia Kazan, The Kremlin Letter (1970) for John Huston, and Big Jake (1971) with John Wayne.

Boone did some TV movies, In Broad Daylight (1971), Deadly Harvest (1972), and Goodnight, My Love (1972). Around this time he moved to Florida.

=== Hec Ramsey ===
In the early 1970s, Boone starred in the short-lived TV series Hec Ramsey, which Jack Webb produced for Mark VII Limited Productions. It was about a turn-of-the-20th-century Western-style police detective who preferred to use his brain and criminal forensic skills instead of his gun. The character Ramsey's back story had him as a frontier lawman and gunman in his younger days. Older now, he was the deputy chief of police of a small city in Oklahoma, still a skilled shooter, and carrying a short-barreled Colt Single Action Army revolver. Boone said to an interviewer in 1972, "You know, Hec Ramsey is a lot like Paladin, only fatter."

=== Israel ===
Boone starred in the film Madron (1970), the first Israeli-produced film shot outside Israel, set in the American West of the 1800s. Also in 1970, he accepted an invitation from Israel's Commerce Ministry to provide the Israeli film industry with "Hollywood know-how". In 1979, he received an award from Israeli Prime Minister Yitzhak Rabin "for his contribution to Israeli cinema".

=== Final performances ===
He starred in The Great Niagara (1974) and Against a Crooked Sky (1975) and supported John Wayne a third time, in Wayne's final film, The Shootist (1976). In the mid-1970s, Boone returned to The Neighborhood Playhouse in New York City, where he had once studied acting, to teach.

Boone did God's Gun (1976) with Leif Garrett, Lee Van Cleef, and Jack Palance. He appeared in The Last Dinosaur (1977) and The Big Sleep (1978), and provided the character voice of the dragon Smaug in the 1977 animated film version of J. R. R. Tolkien's The Hobbit. Boone's last roles were in Winter Kills (1979) and The Bushido Blade (1979).

== Personal life ==
Boone was married three times: to Jane Hopper (1937–1940), Mimi Kelly (1949–1950), and Claire McAloon (from 1951 until his death). His son with McAloon, Peter Boone, worked as a child actor in several Have Gun – Will Travel episodes. In 1963, Boone was injured in a car accident.

Boone moved to St. Augustine, Florida from Hawaii in 1970 and worked with the annual local production of Cross and Sword, when he was not acting on television or in movies, until shortly before his death in 1981. In the last year of his life, Boone was appointed Florida's cultural ambassador.

During the 1970s, he wrote a newspaper column, called "It Seems to Me", for a small, free publication called The Town and Traveler. Some paper copies are in his biographical file at the St. Augustine Historical Society. He gave acting lectures at Flagler College in the city in 1972–1973.

== Death ==
Boone died at his home in St. Augustine due to complications from throat cancer. His ashes were scattered in the Pacific Ocean off Hawaii.

== Filmography ==
=== Film ===
Year	Title	Role	Notes
1951	Halls of Montezuma	Lt. Col. Gilfillan	
1951	Call Me Mister	Mess Sergeant	
1951	The Desert Fox: The Story of Rommel	Captain Hermann Aldinger	
1952	Red Skies of Montana	Richard "Dick" Dryer	
1952	Return of the Texan	Rod Murray	
1952	Kangaroo	John W. Gamble	
1952	Way of a Gaucho	Major Salinas	
1952	Pony Soldier		Uncredited
1953	Man on a Tightrope	Krofta	
1953	Vicki	Lt. Ed Cornell	
1953	The Robe	Pontius Pilate	
1953	City of Bad Men	John Ringo	
1953	Beneath the 12-Mile Reef	Thomas Rhys	
1954	Siege at Red River	Brett Manning	
1954	The Raid	Captain Lionel Foster	
1954	Dragnet	Captain Jim Hamilton	
1955	Ten Wanted Men	Wick Campbell	
1955	Man Without a Star	Steve Miles	
1955	Robbers' Roost	Hank Hays	
1955	The Big Knife	Narrator	Uncredited
1956	Battle Stations	The Captain	
1956	Star in the Dust	Sam Hall	
1956	Away All Boats	Lieutenant Fraser	
1957	The Tall T	Frank Usher	
1960	The Alamo	General Sam Houston	
1961	A Thunder of Drums	Captain Stephen Maddocks	
1964	Rio Conchos	James Lassiter	
1965	The War Lord	Bors	
1967	Hombre	Grimes	
1968	Kona Coast	Captain Sam Moran	
1968	The Night of the Following Day	Leer	
1969	The Arrangement	Sam Arness	
1970	The Kremlin Letter	Ward	
1970	Madron	Madron	
1971	Big Jake	John Fain	
1975	Against a Crooked Sky	Russian	
1976	Diamante Lobo	The Sheriff	
1976	The Shootist	Mike Sweeney	
1977	The Last Dinosaur	Maston Thrust Jr.	
1978	The Big Sleep	Lash Canino	
1979	Winter Kills	Keifitz	
1981	The Bushido Blade	Commodore Matthew C. Perry	

=== TV ===
Year	Title	Role	Notes
1949–1950	Actors Studio	Various	3 episodes
1949–1950	The Front Page	Various	10 episodes
1950	Suspense	Mercer	Episode: "Photo Finish"
1954-1956	Medic	Dr. Konrad Styner	
1955-1957	Climax!	Various	4 episodes
1955	Matinee Theatre	Heathcliff	Episode: "Wuthering Height"
1955	General Electric Theater	Abraham Lincoln	Episode: "Love is Eternal"
1955-1956	Lux Video Theatre	Saxon/Vincent Giel	2 episodes
1956	The Ford Television Theatre	Local Press Man	Episode: "Catch at Straws"
1957	Studio One in Hollywood	John Wesley Hardin	Episode: "Dead of Noon"
1957–1963	Have Gun – Will Travel	Paladin	
1958-1960	Playhouse 90	Various	3 episodes
1959-1960	The United States Steel Hour	Various	2 episodes
1963-1964	The Richard Boone Show	Various	
1967	Cimarron Strip	Sergeant Bill Disher	Episode: "The Roarer"
1971	In Broad Daylight	Tony Chappel	TV film
1972	Deadly Harvest	Anton Solca	TV film
1972	Goodnight, My Love	Francis Hogan	TV film
1972-1974	Hec Ramsey	Deputy Police Chief Hec Ramsey	
1977	The Hobbit	Smaug	

== Bibliography ==
- Rothel, David (2001). Richard Boone: A Knight Without Armor in a Savage Land. Madison, NC: Empire Publishing, ISBN 978-0944019368
