= A Christmas Treasure =

Studio album by Julie Andrews
- Released: 1967
- Genre: Christmas
- Label: RCA Victor

Julie Andrews chronology
Thoroughly Modern Millie (1967)	A Christmas Treasure (1967)	Star! (1968)

A Christmas Treasure (official title with subtitle: A Christmas Treasure: Julie Andrews with the Orchestra, Harpsichord & Arrangements of André Previn) is the sixth studio album and first Christmas album by English singer and actress Julie Andrews. It was released in 1967 by RCA Victor and features the participation of André Previn's orchestra. Music on the album is made up of British, Welsh, Scottish and Irish Christmas songs. Initially released in collaboration with Firestone, the album was later reissued by RCA as part of a larger holiday campaign, gaining visibility in both the United States and international markets.

In promotional materials and press coverage, Andrews' association with successful films like The Sound of Music was often emphasized to boost visibility. The album received generally positive reviews from critics, who praised Andrews' vocal performance and the orchestral arrangements by André Previn. Commercially, the album performed well during the holiday season, charting on Billboard's Christmas LPs list and appearing among RCA's top-selling releases of the year in several markets, including Australia.

== Background ==
The album was recorded in the summer of 1966 at the RCA studios in Beverly Hills, and was merchandised through Firestone outlets in the US and Canada, initially titled Your Favorite Christmas Carols, Volume 5. The track listing of the Firestone release is shortened by two songs, "The Lamb of God" and "Greensleeves", resulting in a total of 12 tracks. Rights to the Firestone record have reverted to RCA Victor, and the album was one of the seven new Christmas albums released by the company in 1967, as part of a major Christmas advertising campaign, which included newspaper ads, promotional materials for stores, and prominent placement at points of sale.

The album was expected to be a major success, as Andrews had recently achieved great acclaim with both the soundtrack and the film The Sound of Music, released in 1965. The original Firestone album, Your Favorite Christmas Carols Volume 5, was one of the largest sellers in the company's history of similarly handled recordings.

== Critical reception ==
Professional ratings
Review scores
Source	Rating
AllMusic	4/5 stars

In a contemporary review, Billboard praised it as "a Christmas treasure, indeed", noting that "her voice is sweet and joyful which befits the spirit of the season" and that André Previn's arrangements are "in keeping with the holiday mood". The same opinion was shared by Record World which described it as "a stunning, beautiful Christmas gift", praising Andrews for "singing like the angel on the highest bough" and highlighting the "gorgeous Christmas cantata" arrangements by André Previn. The StarPhoenix considered A Christmas Treasure a "highly enjoyable Christmas record".

In a retrospective review William Ruhlmann of AllMusic noted Andrews' "proper, if warm, vocals" and the "unusual arrangements" by André Previn, and described it as "an appealing but somewhat formal Christmas album".

== Commercial performance ==
On November 18, 1967, Cashbox featured the album in its review section, highlighting its strong selection of musical tracks and predicting its presence on the charts. The same magazine published in July 1967, a list of the best-selling albums in Australia over the past 12 months, and A Christmas Treasure was featured among RCA's top-selling albums.

The album performed well on Billboard's charts. However, since it was a Christmas release, it was not eligible to appear on the Billboard 200 and was instead featured on the Christmas LP's chart, peaking at #9.

== CD release ==
In 2000, a new CD by Andrews titled Greatest Christmas Songs was released with the same track listing of A Christmas Treasure plus three new songs that came from Andrews's 1958's album Julie Andrews Sings: "It Might As Well Be Spring", "Cheek to Cheek" and "Falling in Love with Love". Heather Phares from AllMusic rated this album three out of five stars.

== Track listing ==
No.	Title	Writer(s)	Length
1.	"Joy to the World"	Lowell Mason / Isaac Watts	2:56
2.	"Irish Carol"	Traditional	3:19
3.	"O Little Town of Bethlehem"	Phillips Brooks / Lewis Redner	2:46
4.	"Deck the Halls"	Thomas Oliphant	2:26
5.	"Angels from the Realms of Glory"	James Montgomery	2:33
6.	"The Lamb of God"		3:27
7.	"Away in a Manger"	James R. Murray / Traditional	3:32
8.	"Sunny Bank (I Saw Three Ships)"		2:29
9.	"It Came Upon a Midnight Clear"	Edmund Sears / Richard Storrs Willis	3:15
10.	"Greensleeves (What Child Is This?)"	William Chatterton Dix / Traditional	3:06
11.	"The Bells of Christmas"	Traditional	3:01
12.	"God Rest Ye Merry Gentlemen"	Traditional	3:05
13.	"Wexford Carol"		3:46
14.	"Jingle Bells"	James Pierpont	3:04

== Personnel ==
Credits adapted from the liner notes of A Christmas Treasure record.

- Arranged and Harpsichord by André Previn
- Produced by Neely Plumb, Richard M. Bradshaw
- Engineered by Dick Bogart
- Liner Notes by André Previn
- Photographed (the album cover) by Ken Whitmore

== Charts ==
Weekly chart performance for A Christmas Treasure
Chart (1967)	Peak position
US Top Holiday Albums (Billboard)	9
