= In Broad Daylight (1971 film) =

- Genre: Thriller
- Written by: Larry Cohen
- Directed by: Robert Day
- Starring: Richard Boone; Suzanne Pleshette; Stella Stevens
- Theme music composer: Leonard Rosenman
- Country of origin: United States
- Original language: English

Production
- Executive producer: Aaron Spelling
- Producer: Robert Mirisch
- Cinematography: Archie R. Dalzell
- Editor: Edward Mann
- Running time: 75 minutes
- Production company: Aaron Spelling Productions

Original release
- Network: ABC
- Release: October 16, 1971

In Broad Daylight is a 1971 American television film starring Richard Boone, Stella Stevens and Suzanne Pleshette. It was directed by Robert Day and written by Larry Cohen.

== Plot ==
A blind actor comes up with an elaborate scheme to murder his wife and her lover.

== Cast ==
- Richard Boone as Anthony Chapel
- Suzanne Pleshette as Kate
- Stella Stevens as Elizabeth
- John Marley as Bergman
- Fred Beir as Alex
- Whit Bissell as Moss
- Paul Smith as Charles
- Ken Sansom as Dr. Grant

== Production ==
Cohen thought "it wasn't a bad movie" except for the casting of Boone; Cohen felt Boone's face was so distinctive the concept of the film did not work. Cohen says there was some talk of remaking the film years later as a vehicle for Andrea Bocelli but it did not proceed because of concerns over Bocelli's acting ability. The film was executive produced by Aaron Spelling.

== Reception ==
Academic Tony Williams called the film "one of Cohen's most innovative works" despite the miscasting of Boone.
