= Jack Bear =

American costume designer (1920–2007)

- Born: October 19, 1920; Indianapolis, Indiana, USA
- Died: November 10, 2007 (aged 87); Ferndale, California, USA
- Occupation: Costume designer
- Years active: 1956–1989

Jack Bear (October 19, 1920 – November 10, 2007) was an American costume designer. He was nominated at the 43rd Academy Awards for Best Costumes for the film Darling Lili. The nomination was shared with Donald Brooks.

He was also known for doing costumes on TV shows such as Dallas.

He won an Emmy Award for the costumes on The Julie Andrews Hour.

== Selected filmography ==
- Star Trek: The Motion Picture (1979)
- Darling Lili (1970)
- The Odd Couple (1968)
- Inside Daisy Clover (1965)
