= Norman Savage =

English film editor

- Born: 1930
- Died: 1973 (aged 42–43)
- Occupation: Film editor

Norman Savage (1930–1973) was an English film editor. He is credited as the principal editor on seven feature films, and as the sound editor on another four. He worked with the director David Lean on four films that spanned Savage's entire career. Lean has been noted as possibly "the best British film director ever", and was himself a masterful editor. Savage started his career as an assistant editor on Lean's Hobson's Choice (1954). Savage was Anne V. Coates' first assistant editor for Lean's Lawrence of Arabia (1962). He was nominated for an Academy Award for Best Film Editing for Lean's 1965 film Doctor Zhivago, and was nominated for the BAFTA Award for Best Editing for Lean's 1970 film Ryan's Daughter. Savage died of leukemia while editing the film Lady Caroline Lamb (1972). That film is the only one directed by Robert Bolt, a playwright and screenwriter who had worked on several films directed by Lean.

== Filmography as Editor ==
This partial filmography is based on the complete filmography listed as the Internet Movie Database.

Year	Title	Director(s)	Notes
1965	The Wild Affair	John Krish	Co-editing with Russell Lloyd
1965	Doctor Zhivago	David Lean	Nominated for an Academy Award for Best Film Editing
1967	Three Bites of the Apple	Alvin Ganzer	
1968	Prudence and the Pill	Fielder Cook and Ronald Neame (uncredited)	
1969	The Prime of Miss Jean Brodie	Ronald Neame	
1970	Ryan's Daughter	David Lean	Nominated for a BAFTA Award for Best Editing
1972	Lady Caroline Lamb	Robert Bolt	
