= Ryan's Daughter =

1970 film by David Lean

- UK theatrical release poster
- Directed by: David Lean
- Written by: Robert Bolt
- Produced by: Anthony Havelock-Allan
- Starring: Robert Mitchum; Trevor Howard; Christopher Jones; John Mills; Leo McKern; Sarah Miles
- Cinematography: Freddie Young
- Edited by: Norman Savage
- Music by: Maurice Jarre
- Production company: Faraway Productions
- Distributed by: Metro-Goldwyn-Mayer (through MGM-EMI Distributors)
- Release date: 9 November 1970
- Running time: 195 minutes; 206 minutes (DVD release)
- Country: United Kingdom
- Language: English
- Budget: $13.3 million
- Box office: $30.8 million; $14.6 million (rentals)

Ryan's Daughter is a 1970 British epic romantic drama film directed by David Lean, written by Robert Bolt and starring Robert Mitchum and Sarah Miles. The film, set between August 1917 and January 1918, tells the story of a married Irish woman who has an affair with a British officer during World War I, despite moral and political opposition from her nationalist neighbours. The supporting cast features John Mills, Christopher Jones, Trevor Howard and Leo McKern. The film is a re-telling of the plot of Gustave Flaubert's 1857 novel Madame Bovary.

The score was written by Maurice Jarre and the movie was photographed in Super Panavision 70 by Freddie Young. In its initial release, Ryan's Daughter was harshly received by critics but was a box office success, grossing $30.8 million on a budget of $13.3 million, making the film the eighth-highest-grossing picture of 1970. It was nominated for four Academy Awards and won in two categories.

== Plot ==
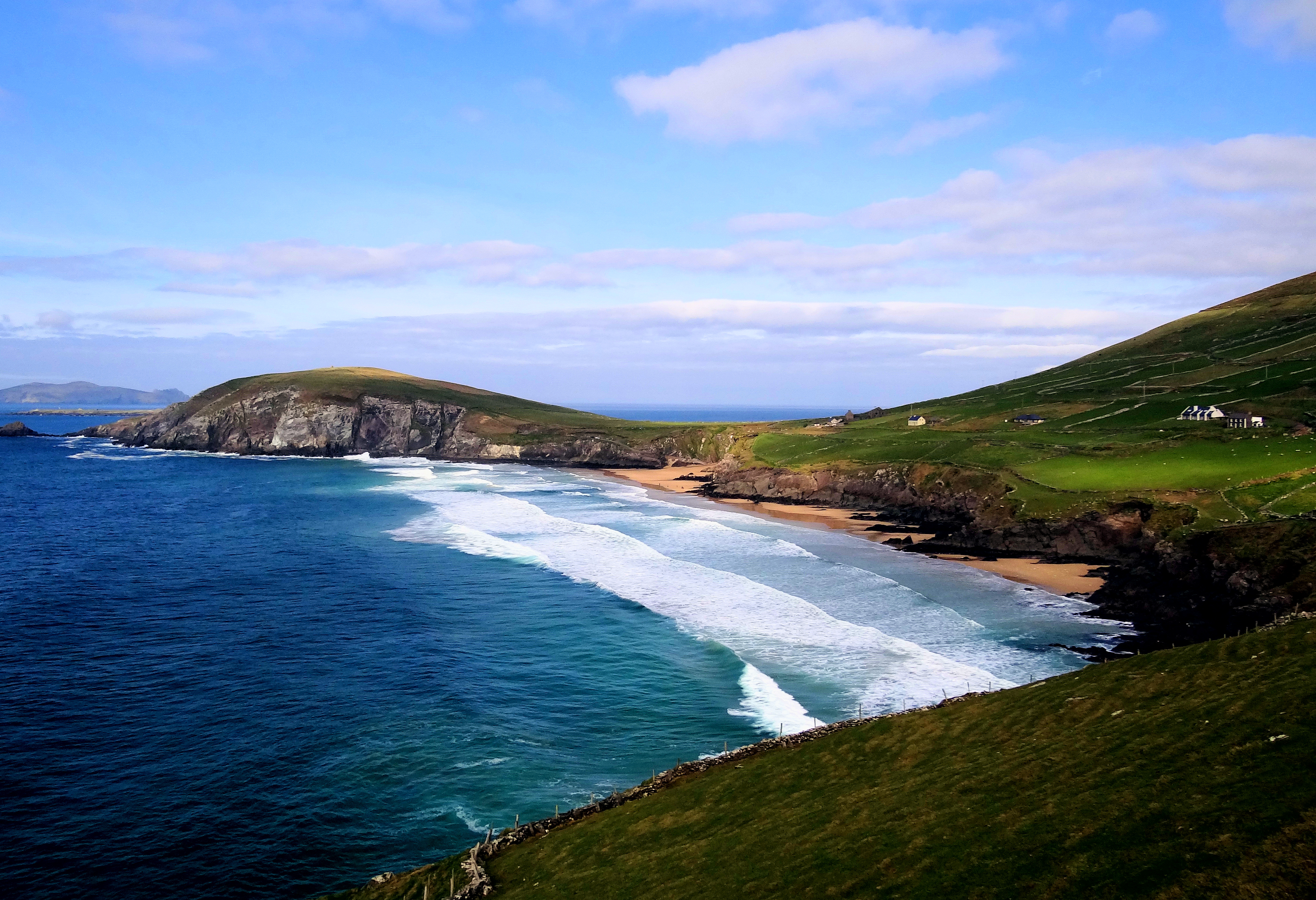
The beach between Slea Head and Dunmore Head on the Dingle Peninsula in County Kerry, Ireland, a location where scenes for Ryan's Daughter were filmed.

In August 1917, Rosy Ryan, only daughter of the local publican, widower Thomas Ryan, is bored with life in Kirrary, an isolated village on the Dingle Peninsula in County Kerry in the south-west of Ireland. The villagers are Irish nationalists, taunting British soldiers from a nearby army camp. Tom Ryan publicly supports the recently suppressed Easter Rising, but secretly serves the British as an informer. Rosy falls in love with the village schoolmaster, widower Charles Shaughnessy. She imagines, though he tries to convince her otherwise, that he will somehow add excitement to her life. They marry and settle in the schoolhouse, but he is a quiet man uninterested in physical love.

Major Randolph Doryan arrives in October 1917 to take command of the army camp. After winning a Victoria Cross on the Western Front, he has a crippled leg and is suffering from shell shock. When he visits the pub where Rosy is serving alone, he collapses under a flashback to the trenches and is comforted by her. The two kiss passionately until they are interrupted by the arrival of Ryan and others. Next day, the two ride to a forest for a passionate liaison and make love for the first time. Charles becomes suspicious of Rosy, but keeps his thoughts to himself.

Charles takes his schoolchildren to the beach, where he notices Doryan's telltale footprints accompanied by a woman's in the sand. He tracks the prints to a cave and imagines Doryan and Rosy conducting an affair. Local halfwit Michael notices the footprints as well and searches the cave, finding one of Major Doryan's gold coat buttons. He pins it on his lapel on a scarlet ribbon like the Major’s Victoria Cross and proudly parades through the village, but suffers abuse from the villagers. When Rosy comes riding past, Michael approaches her tenderly. Between Rosy's dismay and Michael's pantomime, the villagers surmise that she is having an affair with Doryan.

One night in January 1918, during a fierce storm, IRB leader Tim O'Leary and a small band of his men arrive in Ryan's pub seeking help to recover a shipment of German arms being floated from a ship towards the beach. When they leave, Ryan tips off the British. The entire village turns out to help the rebels, with Ryan the most outwardly devoted to the task, wading into the breakers repeatedly to salvage boxes of weapons and explosives. O'Leary is overwhelmed by Ryan's devotion, and the villagers are ebullient. They gleefully free the rebels' loaded truck from the wet sand and follow it up the hill. Doryan, waiting at the top with his troops, captures the men and arms. O'Leary tries to flee, but Doryan climbs atop the truck and brings him down with a single rifle shot. Then he suffers a flashback and collapses. Rosy presses through the crowd in concern, outraging the villagers.

Charles tells Rosy that he had let her affair run its course, hoping that the infatuation would pass, but now wants a separation. Rosy says the affair is over, but that night she leaves their bed in her nightdress to meet Doryan. In dismay, Charles wanders in his nightclothes to the beach, where the parish priest Father Collins finds him. The villagers, led by Mr. McCardle, storm into the schoolhouse and seize Rosy, convinced that she informed the British of the arms shipment. Thomas watches in shame and horror the mob humiliating her by stripping her clothes off and Mrs. McCardle shearing her hair until Father Collins intervenes.

Doryan walks along the beach and gives his cigarette case to Michael. In gratitude, Michael leads Doryan to a cache of arms, including dynamite, that was not recovered. After Michael runs off, Doryan commits suicide by detonating the explosives. The next day, Rosy and Charles leave for Dublin, while Father Collins and Michael help carry their luggage to the bus stop. Before they leave, Father Collins says to Charles that his only doubt is the same as Charles's: if he and Rosy should separate.

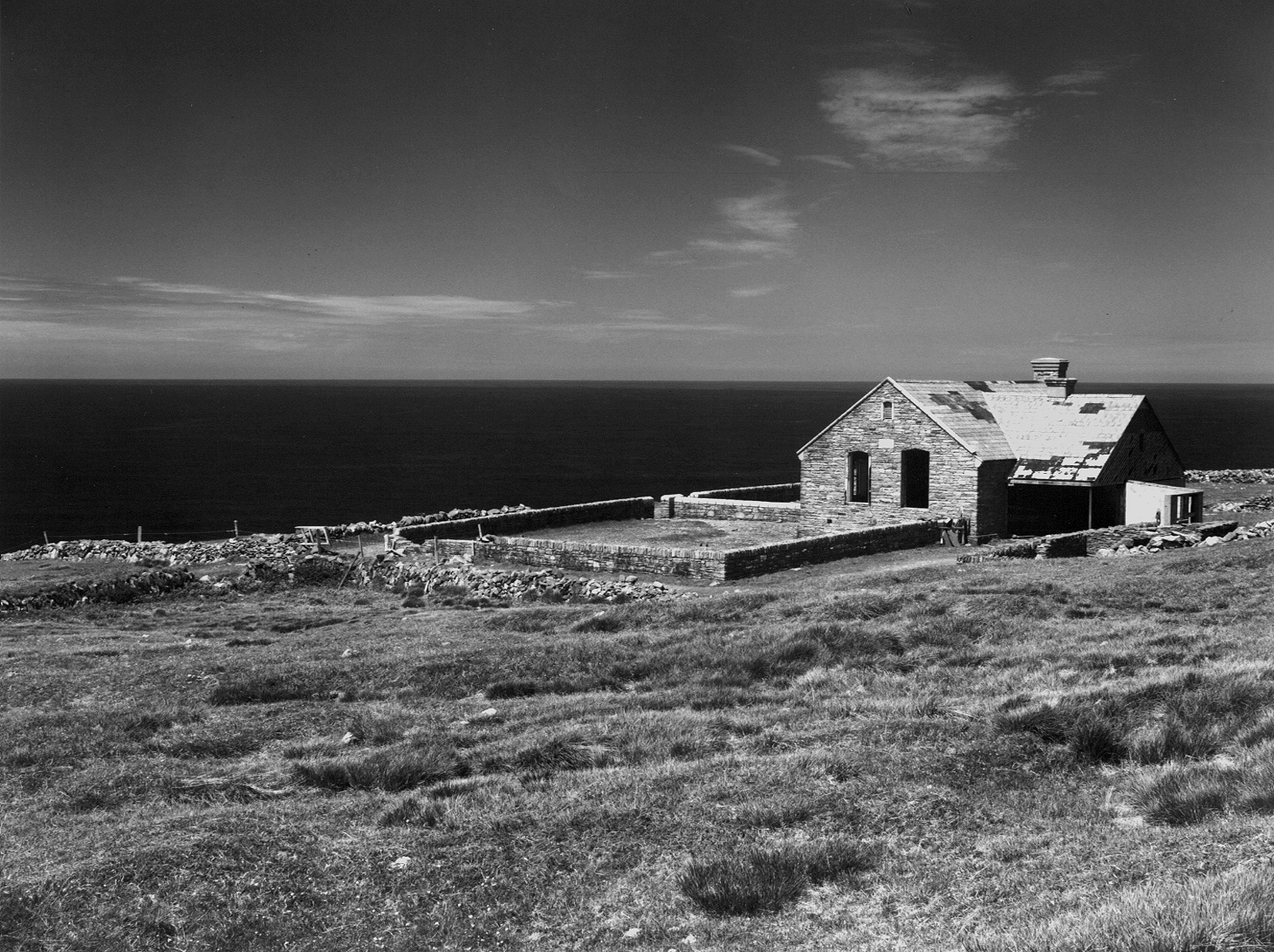
Schoolhouse Ryan's Daughter, 1986

== Cast ==
- Robert Mitchum as Charles Shaughnessy
- Sarah Miles as Rosy Ryan
- Trevor Howard as Father Hugh Collins
- John Mills as Michael
- Christopher Jones as Major Randolph Doryan
- Leo McKern as Thomas Ryan
- Barry Foster as Tim O'Leary
- Gerald Sim as Captain Smith
- Evin Crowley as Maureen Cassidy
- Marie Kean as Mrs. McCardle
- Arthur O'Sullivan as Joe McCardle
- Brian O'Higgins as Constable O'Connor
- Barry Jackson as a Corporal

== Production ==
The production was largely filmed on the Dingle Peninsula in County Kerry, Ireland, in the spring and summer of 1969. However, due to poor weather, many of the beach scenes were filmed at Arniston in South Africa, easily identified by the nearby beach's white sand. The shipwreck where Doryan detonates the explosives is that of the SS Kakapo which can be found just south of Cape Town.

=== Development ===
Robert Bolt's original idea was to make a film of Madame Bovary, starring Miles. Lean read the script and said that he did not find it interesting, but suggested to Bolt that he would like to rework it into another setting. The film still retains parallels with Flaubert's novel – Rosy parallels Emma Bovary, Charles is her husband, and Major Doryan is analogous to Rodolphe and Leon, Emma's lovers.

=== Casting ===
Alec Guinness turned down the role of Father Collins; it had been written with him in mind, but Guinness, a Roman Catholic convert, objected to what he felt was an inaccurate portrayal of a Catholic priest. His conflicts with Lean while making Doctor Zhivago also contributed. Paul Scofield was Lean's first choice for the part of Shaughnessy, but he was unable to leave a theatre commitment. George C. Scott, Anthony Hopkins, and Patrick McGoohan were considered but not approached, and Gregory Peck lobbied for the role but gave up after Robert Mitchum was approached.

Reportedly, Mitchum initially was reluctant to take the role. While he admired the script, he was undergoing a personal crisis at the time and when pressed by Lean as to why he would not be available for filming, told him: "I was actually planning on committing suicide." Upon hearing of this, scriptwriter Bolt told him, "Well, if you just finish working on this wretched little film and then do yourself in, I'd be happy to stand the expenses of your burial."

The role of Major Doryan was written for Marlon Brando, who initially accepted, but problems with the production of Burn! forced him to drop out. Peter O'Toole, Richard Harris and Richard Burton also were considered. Lean then saw Christopher Jones in The Looking Glass War (1969) and decided he had to have Jones for the part, and so cast him without ever meeting him. He thought Jones had that rare Brando/Dean quality he wanted on film.

=== Filming ===
Lean had to wait a year before a suitably dramatic storm appeared. The image was kept clear of spray by a glass disk spinning in front of the lens, known as a Clear View screen.

Mitchum clashed with Lean, saying that "Working with David Lean is like constructing the Taj Mahal out of toothpicks"; despite this, Mitchum confided to friends and family that he felt Ryan's Daughter was among his best roles and he regretted the negative response the film received. In a radio interview, Mitchum said that, despite the difficult production, Lean was one of the best directors he had worked with.

Jones claimed to have had an affair with Sharon Tate, who was killed by Charles Manson and his followers during filming, which devastated Jones. Miles and Jones also grew to dislike one another, leading to trouble when filming the love scenes. Jones was engaged to Olivia Hussey, and he was not attracted to Miles. He even refused to do the forest love scene with her, which prompted Miles to conspire with Mitchum. It was Mitchum who settled on the idea of drugging Jones by sprinkling an unspecified substance on his cereal. Mitchum overdosed Jones, however, and the actor was nearly catatonic during the love scene.

Jones and Lean clashed frequently. Due to Jones's inability to do a convincing British accent and because Lean thought that Jones's voice was too flat to be compelling, he decided to have all of Jones's lines overdubbed by Carry On actor Julian Holloway. Lean was not alone in his disappointment with the actor; Jones's retirement from acting was purportedly due to the bad reviews he received for Ryan's Daughter.

The film was more than 185 days over schedule.

== Release ==
=== MPAA rating ===
The Motion Picture Association of America originally gave Ryan's Daughter an "R" rating. A nude scene between Miles and Jones, as well as its themes involving infidelity, were the primary reasons for the decision. At the time, MGM was having financial trouble and appealed the rating not due to artistic but financial reasons.

At the appeal hearing, MGM executives explained that they needed the less restrictive rating to allow more audience into the theatres; otherwise the company would not be able to survive financially. The appeal was granted and the film received a "GP" rating, which later became "PG". American political adviser Jack Valenti considered this to be one of the tarnishing marks on the rating system. When MGM resubmitted the film to the MPAA in 1996, it was re-rated "R."

=== Theatrical release ===
Ryan's Daughter opened at the Ziegfeld Theatre in New York City on 9 November 1970 and grossed $50,050 in its opening week.

After two months of release, it had grossed over $2 million worldwide.

=== Reception ===
Upon its initial release, Ryan's Daughter received a hostile reception from many film reviewers. Roger Ebert gave it two stars out of four and wrote that "Lean's characters, well written and well acted, are finally dwarfed by his excessive scale." Vincent Canby of The New York Times called the screenplay "the kind of book-club fiction that should be read under a hair-dryer, a fact that cannot be disguised by the elaborate production (Mr. Lean built his own, brand-new Irish village for the film) and the almost metaphysical style." Arthur D. Murphy of Variety called the film a "brilliant enigma, brilliant, because David Lean achieved to a marked degree the daring and obvious goal of intimate romantic tragedy along the rugged geographical and political landscape of 1916 Ireland; an enigma, because overlength of perhaps 30 minutes serves to magnify some weaknesses of Robert Bolt's original screenplay, to dissipate the impact of the performances, and to overwhelm outstanding photography and production." Gene Siskel of the Chicago Tribune gave the film one-and-a-half stars out of four and wrote, "Poor casting, heavy-handed direction that becomes comical during the big love scene and empty-headed characters make David Lean's 'Ryan's Daughter' an epic disappointment." Charles Champlin of the Los Angeles Times wrote, "The original love story which Robert Bolt has set in these desolate seascapes seems both too frail and too banal to sustain the crushing weight of 3 hours and 18 minutes of Super Panavision." Pauline Kael of The New Yorker wrote, "There is no artistic or moral rationale for this movie—only expediency ... The emptiness of 'Ryan's Daughter' shows in practically every frame." According to James Wolcott, at a gathering of the National Society of Film Critics, Time critic Richard Schickel asked Lean "how someone who made Brief Encounter could make a piece of bullshit like Ryan's Daughter."

Some attribute the negative reviews to critics' expectations being too high, following the three epics Lean had directed in a row before Ryan's Daughter. The preview cut ran for over 220 minutes and was criticised for its length and poor pacing. Lean felt obliged to remove up to 17 minutes of footage before the film's wide release. The missing footage has not been restored or located. Lean took these criticisms very personally, claiming at the time that he would never make another film. (Others dispute this, citing the fact that Lean tried but was unable to get several projects off the ground, including The Bounty.) The film was moderately successful worldwide at the box office and was one of the most successful films of 1970 in Britain, where it ran at a West End cinema for almost two years straight.

The film was also criticised for its alleged depiction of the Irish proletariat as uncivilised. An Irish commentator in 2008 called them "the local herd-like and libidinous populace who lack gainful employment to keep them occupied".

Since the film's release on DVD, Ryan's Daughter has retained its reputation as one of Lean's weakest films, critics finding it "overlong" (Variety), "a weary Madame Bovary rehash" (The Times) and "a lush and overblown self-indulgence in which David Lean has given us a great deal less than meets the eye" (Roger Ebert). Other elements, like John Mills' caricature of "the village idiot" (an Oscar-winning performance), have been met with ambivalence. A 2020 review of an account of the film's production, Making Ryan’s Daughter: The Myths, Madness and Mastery in The Irish Times characterises its extravagances and personality clashes in much the same way as critics of the film itself, "a fascinating but ultimately indulgent and doomed enterprise."

On the review aggregator website Rotten Tomatoes, 47% of 19 critics' reviews are positive, with an average rating of 5.6/10.

=== Accolades ===
Award	Category	Nominee(s)	Result	Ref.
Academy Awards	Best Actress	Sarah Miles	Nominated	
Academy Awards	Best Supporting Actor	John Mills	Won	
Academy Awards	Best Cinematography	Freddie Young	Won	
Academy Awards	Best Sound	Gordon McCallum and John Bramall	Nominated	
British Academy Film Awards	Best Film	David Lean	Nominated	
British Academy Film Awards	Best Direction	David Lean	Nominated	
British Academy Film Awards	Best Actress in a Leading Role	Sarah Miles	Nominated	
British Academy Film Awards	Best Actor in a Supporting Role	John Mills	Nominated	
British Academy Film Awards	Best Actress in a Supporting Role	Evin Crowley	Nominated	
British Academy Film Awards	Best Cinematography	Freddie Young	Nominated	
British Academy Film Awards	Best Costume Design	Jocelyn Rickards	Nominated	
British Academy Film Awards	Best Editing	Norman Savage	Nominated	
British Academy Film Awards	Best Production Design	Stephen B. Grimes	Nominated	
British Academy Film Awards	Best Sound	Gordon McCallum	Nominated	
British Society of Cinematographers Awards	Best Cinematography in a Theatrical Feature Film	Freddie Young	Won	
David di Donatello Awards	Best Foreign Production	Anthony Havelock-Allan	Won	
Directors Guild of America Awards	Outstanding Directorial Achievement in Motion Pictures	David Lean	Nominated	
Evening Standard British Film Awards	Best Film	David Lean	Won	
Golden Globe Awards	Best Actress in a Motion Picture – Drama	Sarah Miles	Nominated	
Golden Globe Awards	Best Supporting Actor – Motion Picture	Trevor Howard	Nominated	
Golden Globe Awards	Best Supporting Actor – Motion Picture	John Mills	Won	
Grammy Awards	Best Original Score Written for a Motion Picture or a Television Special	Maurice Jarre	Nominated	
Kansas City Film Circle Critics Awards	Best Supporting Actor	John Mills	Won	
Laurel Awards	Best Picture		6th Place	
Laurel Awards	Top Female Dramatic Performance	Sarah Miles	Nominated	
Laurel Awards	Top Male Supporting Performance	Trevor Howard	5th Place	
Laurel Awards	Top Cinematographer	Freddie Young	Nominated	
Laurel Awards	Top Composer	Maurice Jarre	5th Place	
Laurel Awards	Star of Tomorrow – Male	Christopher Jones	Won	
National Board of Review Awards	Top Ten Films		5th Place	

==== Others ====
The film is recognized by American Film Institute in these lists:

- 2005: AFI's 100 Years of Film Scores – Nominated
