= Star! (soundtrack) =

Soundtrack album by Julie Andrews
- Released: 1968
- Genre: Jazz
- Label: 20th Century Fox Records

Julie Andrews chronology
| A Christmas Treasure (1967) | Star! (1968) | Darling Lili (1969) |

Singles from Star!
- 1. "Star!" Released: 1968

Star! is the soundtrack album to the 1968 musical film of the same name, released by the label 20th Century Fox Records. The film, directed by Robert Wise, is a biographical portrayal of the life of British actress and singer Gertrude Lawrence, played by Julie Andrews. The soundtrack features Andrews performing a collection of classic songs from the early 20th century, including works by Noël Coward, George Gershwin, Cole Porter, and Kurt Weill, among others associated with Lawrence's career.

Despite the film's underwhelming box office performance, the album earning praise for its musical arrangements. The album includes fourteen tracks by Julie Andrews, with performances such as "Someone to Watch Over Me" "My Ship" and "Limehouse Blues".

Andrews' performances received mixed reactions from critics, with some praising her delivery of ballads and vaudeville numbers, while others noted her limitations in more suggestive or dramatic pieces. The soundtrack was initially released as an LP and later reissued on CD with extended versions of select tracks.

== Promotion ==
A significant promotional campaign was launched to market the album, particularly in Japan, where a major advertising push was planned to coincide with the film’s theatrical release in August 1968. Additionally, ABC's national distribution meeting in Los Angeles focused on promoting the soundtrack alongside other ABC releases. ABC Records announced the release for June 1968, with a deluxe double-folded jacket containing a booklet with information about the songs and film.

=== Single ===
The song "Star!" was released as a single on a 7-inch vinyl record issued by 20th Century Fox Records (catalog number 45-6712 in both the US and the UK) as part of the promotional material for the film. The single features two tracks: the title song "Star!", written by Sammy Cahn and Jimmy Van Heusen, with a runtime of 2:19, and the B-side "Someone to Watch Over Me," composed by George and Ira Gershwin, running 3:14.

== Critical reception ==
Professional ratings
Review scores
| Source | Rating |
|---|---|
| AllMusic | 3.5/5 stars |
| Record Mirror | 5/5 stars |

Billboard wrote that Julie Andrews "brilliantly brings the standard gems of the Gershwins to Coward, Weill and Porter to life all over again", with "exceptional musical arrangements by Lennie Hayton". The Record Mirror praised the album as "a tremendous score and a handful of songs which move straight into the standard category".

In a retrospective review, William Ruhlmann of AllMusic wrote that "although Andrews dominates the disc, she does share the spotlight here and there, notably on "Dear Little Boy (Dear Little Girl)", joining Daniel Massey". He added that she's terrific on the ballad 'Someone to Watch Over Me' and some of the vaudeville songs.

== Commercial performance ==
Star! debuted on the Billboard 200 chart on October 26, 1968, and slowly climbed the rankings before reaching its peak position at number 98 on January 18, 1969. It remained on the chart for a total of 20 weeks. In the United Kingdom, the album peaked at number 36 on September 21, 1968, managing to stay on the chart for a single week.

== Track listing ==
| No. | Title | Writer(s) | Performer (s) | Length |
|---|---|---|---|---|
| 1. | "Overture (Medley) Star!, Someone To Watch Over Me, Jenny, Dear Little Boy (Dear Little Girl), Limehouse Blues" | Various | Conductor – Lennie Hayton Orchestra – 20th Century Fox Orchestra | 3:02 |
| 2. | "Star!" | Kahn, Van Heusen | Julie Andrews | 1:16 |
| 3. | "Piccadilly" | Sievier, Morande, Williams | Beryl Reid, Bruce Forsyth, Julie Andrews | 2:00 |
| 4. | "In My Garden Of Joy" | Chaplin | The Daffodils | 1:28 |
| 5. | "Oh, It's A Lovely War" | Long, Scott | Julie Andrews, The Daffodils | 1:42 |
| 6. | "'N' Everything" | Jolson, De Sylva, Kahn | Garrett Lewis | 1:44 |
| 7. | "Burlington Bertie From Bow" | Hargreaves | Julie Andrews | 2:00 |
| 8. | "Parisian Pierrot" | Coward | Julie Andrews | 2:24 |
| 9. | "Limehouse Blues" | Furber, Braham | Julie Andrews | 4:15 |
| 10. | "Someone to Watch Over Me" | G. & I. Gershwin | Julie Andrews | 3:11 |
| 11. | "Do, Do, Do" | G. & I. Gershwin* | Julie Andrews | 1:36 |
| 12. | "Dear Little Boy (Dear Little Girl)" | G. & I. Gershwin | Daniel Massey, Julie Andrews | 1:57 |
| 13. | "Has Anybody Seen Our Ship?" | Coward | Julie Andrews | 1:35 |
| 14. | "Someday I'll Find You" | Coward | Julie Andrews | 1:39 |
| 15. | "The Physician" | Porter | Julie Andrews | 3:08 |
| 16. | "My Ship" | Gershwin, Weill | Julie Andrews | 2:15 |
| 17. | "Jenny" | Gershwin, Weill | Julie Andrews | 5:28 |

== Personnel ==
Credits adapted from the liner notes of Star! record.

- Arranged and conducted by Lennie Hayton
- Directed by Robert Wise
- Producer by Saul Chaplin
- Written by William Fairchild

== Charts ==
Weekly chart performance for Star!
| Chart (1968) | Peak position |
|---|---|
| UK Albums (OCC) | 36 |
| U.S. (Billboard 200) | 98 |
