= Darling Lili =

1970 film by Blake Edwards

- Theatrical release poster
- Directed by: Blake Edwards
- Written by: William Peter Blatty; Blake Edwards
- Produced by: Owen Crump
- Starring: Julie Andrews; Rock Hudson; Jeremy Kemp; Lance Percival; Michael Witney; Jacques Marin; André Maranne; Gloria Paul
- Cinematography: Russell Harlan
- Edited by: Peter Zinner
- Music by: Henry Mancini
- Production company: Geoffrey Productions
- Distributed by: Paramount Pictures
- Release dates: June 23, 1970 (Premiere); June 24, 1970 (Los Angeles)
- Running time: 136 minutes (original roadshow release); 107 min (director's cut)
- Country: United States
- Language: English
- Budget: $25 million
- Box office: $3.25 million (Distributor rentals)

Darling Lili is a 1970 American romantic-musical spy film, written by William Peter Blatty and Blake Edwards, the latter also directing the film. It stars Julie Andrews, Rock Hudson, and Jeremy Kemp, with music by Henry Mancini and lyrics by Johnny Mercer. This was the last full musical to have song lyrics written by Mercer.

== Plot ==
During World War I, Lili Smith is a beloved English musical star and a secret German spy, much admired by the French and British pilots who she mixes with at the Cafe Can-Can. One American, Major Larrabee, woos her with a gypsy serenade outside her window inviting her to a night-time champagne picnic. She is soon passing information gleaned from Larrabee to Colonel Kurt Von Ruger, the German liaison masquerading as her uncle.

Larrabee showers her with red roses and they begin a courtship. The French authorities think Larrabee is the spy and ask Lili to keep an eye on him. While out at dinner together a drunken fellow pilot, Lieutenant Carstairs, asks Larrabee about "Operation" Crepe Suzette, and he deflects by reminding Carstairs the "operation" is top secret, which Lili reports to Von Ruger, who tells her to find out more.

The French authorities, Duvalle and Liggett, spy on both Larrabee and Lili at a hotel getaway where they share a room. As they begin to make love Lili suddenly accuses Larrabee of calling her Suzette, and in a panic he again tries to deflect by saying he said "my pet", which she rejects. He soon admits Operation Crepe Suzette is a military operation and teases a few more details she reports to Von Ruger.

With Larrabee away on a mission the French tell Lili they now suspect the German spy is Crepe Suzette, a burlesque dancer, and she goes to weigh up the competition. In a fury Lili then does her own striptease to a song that seemed demure before. When Larrabee returns and tells her the true story of his encounter with the Red Baron, she mocks him - until Von Ruger calls and confirms it. But when Larrabee leaves Lili follows him despite assuring him she now believes him.

Lili plants her code book in Suzette's rooms to get Larrabee and Suzette arrested for treason after she sees them together. While Lili is awarded the Legion of Honour at a huge ceremony, the evening paper reveals Suzette's claim that Larrabee met her to end the relationship because he was in love with another woman.

Lili goes to the French to confess in an attempt to save Larrabee from the firing squad, evading a German assassin after they send her away in disbelief. Von Ruger plans an escape to Switzerland but the assassin captures them on the train. The assassin dies in a German aerial attack on the train, while Larrabee's squadron defends it successfully. He sees Lili on the ground and tips his wing in salute.

The war ends and Lili sings on a dark stage in Geneva surrounded by pilots looking on from the wings. Larrabee comes out and kisses her and the crowd cheers.

== Cast ==
- Julie Andrews as Lili Smith/Schmidt
- Rock Hudson as Major William Larrabee
- Jeremy Kemp as Colonel Kurt Von Ruger
- Gloria Paul as Crepe Suzette
- Lance Percival as Lieutenant Carstairs, aka TC
- Michael Witney as Youngblood Carson
- Jacques Marin as Captain Duvalle
- André Maranne as Lieutenant Liggett
- Bernard Kay as Bedford the chauffeur
- Doreen Keogh as Emma the maid
- Carl Duering as General Kessler
- Vernon Dobtcheff as Otto Kraus
- Laurie Main as French General
- Arthur Gould-Porter as Sgt. Wells
- Ingo Mogendorf as Baron Manfred von Richtofen

== Production ==
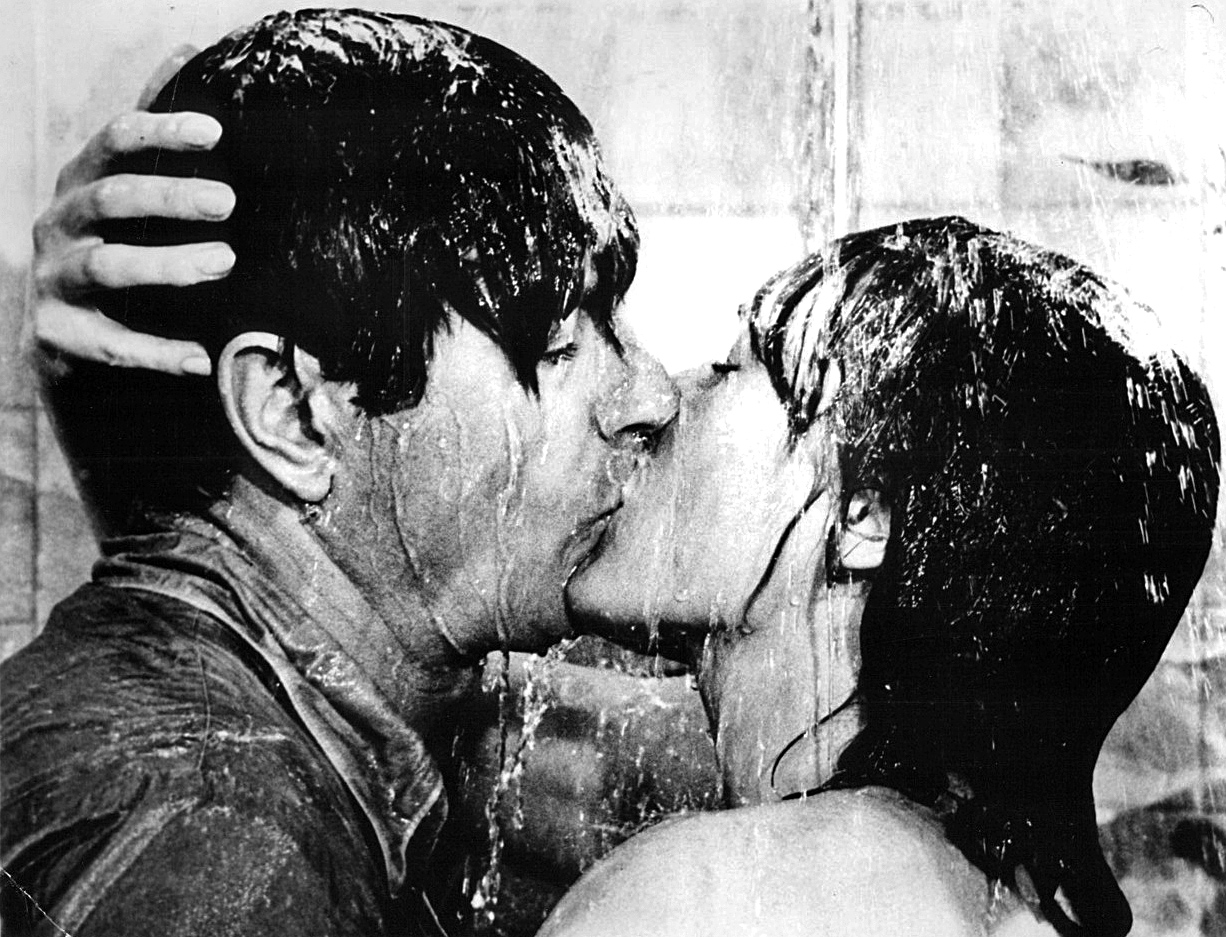
Rock Hudson and Andrews kissing in Darling Lili (1970)

In 1967, Blake Edwards signed a four-picture deal with Paramount Pictures. The projects he would make were Waterhole No. 3, Gunn, the television series Mr. Lucky and Darling Lili. Julie Andrews signed to play the lead in Darling Lili. Production was to start late in 1967. Executive producer Owen Crump began shooting second unit in 1967.

The film was given a budget of $6 million and Andrews was paid $1.1 million and promised 10% of the film's profits. Edwards wanted to film the aerial dogfight scenes in South Carolina, but was forced to film them in Ireland, with planes from The Blue Max, due to studio demand despite it costing $70,000 per day. Edwards later claimed Darling Lili was budgeted at $11.5 million, but ended up costing $16 million with half of the cost coming from the second unit filming in Ireland. Filming was later moved to Belgium, where filming cost $50,000 per day. The final budget for the film was $25 million, making it one of the most-expensive musicals made by Paramount.

Edwards courted British comedian Benny Hill for a supporting role in the movie. During the audition, he asked Hill if he could do a Paris accent. Being a perfectionist, Hill asked Edwards if he wanted an east side or west side accent, but Edwards was not impressed by his attention to detail and recast the role of Captain Duvalle with Jacques Marin.

Edwards suffered continual interference from Paramount executives while making Darling Lili, and it was eventually edited by the studio largely without his input. The director later satirized the problems he faced in the film S.O.B. (1981), which was also distributed by Paramount theatrically.

Problems with the May 1968 protests in France led to much of the planned Parisian shooting to be done in Brussels, Belgium.

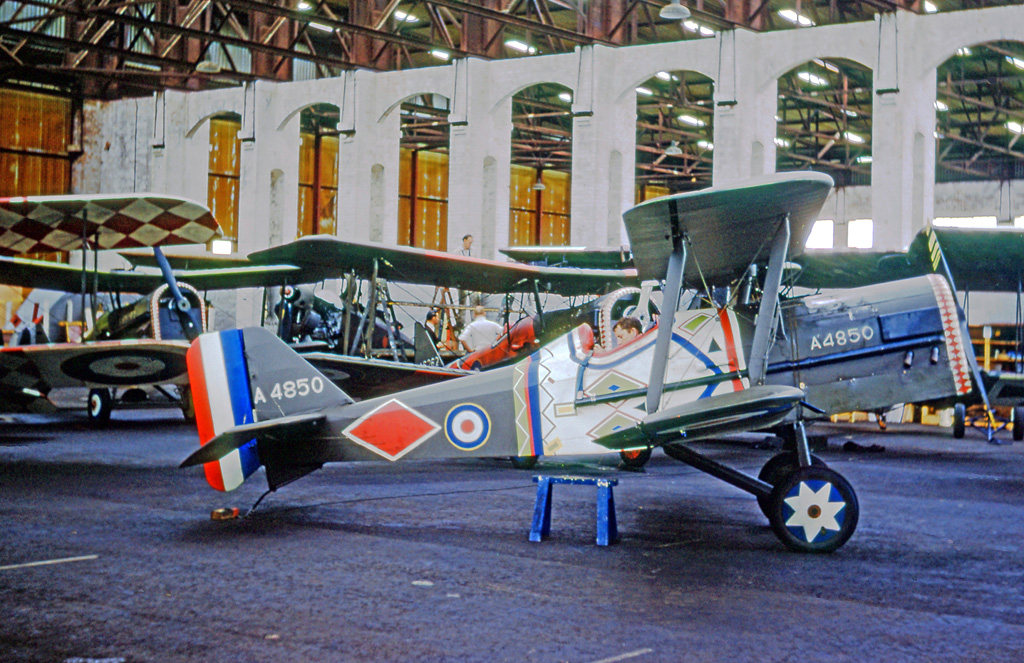
Slingsby Aircraft-built SE.5A scale replica during filming in Ireland in 1967

Darling Lili made use of Lynn Garrison’s aviation facility at Weston Aerodrome in Leixlip, Ireland. This collection of World War I replica fighter aircraft, facilities and support equipment was originally put together in support of 20th Century Fox’s 1966 film The Blue Max. The aerial fleet included a Caudron 277, two Fokker DR 1s, three Fokker D VIIs, two Se 5as and two Pfalz D IIIs (all full-scale replicas). In addition, the studio contracted with Slingsby Aircraft Ltd to build six 7/8th scale SE 5s (the "Mini SE 5"). The Paramount production utilized the assembled aircraft for thousands of flying hours and accumulated hundreds of hours of aerial footage. Pilots were drawn from the Irish Air Corps and civilian circles. Charles Boddington and Derek Piggott did many of the more spectacular stunts.

== Music ==
The original score for Darling Lili was composed by Henry Mancini. He and Johnny Mercer wrote the title tune, as well as "Whistling Away the Dark" and "Your Good-Will Ambassador". Songs from the era were performed in the film, including "It's a Long Way to Tipperary", "Pack Up Your Troubles in Your Old Kit-Bag", "Keep the Home Fires Burning", and "Mademoiselle from Armentières".

== Release ==
The film had its premiere at the Cinerama Dome in Los Angeles on June 23, 1970, before opening to the public the following day. The film's distribution was badly managed by Paramount executives and Darling Lili barely got a release in most of the United States.

== Reception ==
=== Critical response ===
On the review aggregator website Rotten Tomatoes, 40% of 5 critics' reviews are positive, with an average rating of 4.8/10.

Stefan Kanfer, reviewing the film for Time, called it a "common, overproduced, underinspired feature".

=== Box office ===
The film was a box-office bomb, earning only $3.2 million in distributor rentals, against a final estimated budget of $25 million.

== Accolades ==
Despite being a financial failure, the film was nominated for a number of awards.

| Award | Category | Nominee(s) | Result |
|---|---|---|---|
| Academy Awards | Best Costume Design | Donald Brooks and Jack Bear | Nominated |
| Academy Awards | Best Original Song Score | Music by Henry Mancini; Lyrics by Johnny Mercer | Nominated |
| Academy Awards | Best Song – Original for the Picture | "Whistling Away the Dark"; Music by Henry Mancini; Lyrics by Johnny Mercer | Nominated |
| Golden Globe Awards | Best Motion Picture – Musical or Comedy | | Nominated |
| Golden Globe Awards | Best Actress in a Motion Picture – Musical or Comedy | Julie Andrews | Nominated |
| Golden Globe Awards | Best Original Song – Motion Picture | "Whistling Away the Dark"; Music by Henry Mancini; Lyrics by Johnny Mercer | Won |
| Grammy Awards | Best Original Score Written for a Motion Picture or a Television Special | Henry Mancini and Johnny Mercer | Nominated |
| Laurel Awards | Top Composer | Henry Mancini | 4th Place |

== Director's cut ==
In 1991, at the behest of Michael Schlesinger, then the head of Paramount's Repertory division, Edwards was invited to recut Darling Lili to his original intentions. This director's cut was 29 minutes shorter than the original release. A fully restored, new Dolby SR 35mm print premiered at the 1992 Cannes Film Festival and was attended by Edwards and Andrews; the U.S. premiere was at the Directors Guild theater in Los Angeles shortly thereafter, again with both in attendance. Then, after a brief domestic theatrical reissue, it was released to home video and television; this version was released on Region 1 DVD. The original roadshow version, complete with overture and exit music, has aired on Turner Classic Movies as well as receiving commercial release on Region 2 DVD in Europe.

== See also ==
- List of American films of 1970

== Works cited ==
- Medved, Harry; Medved, Michael (1984). "Star-Crossed Lovers | Darling Lili (1970)". The Hollywood Hall of Shame: The Most Expensive Flops in Movie History. London: Angus & Robertson. pp. 88–93. ISBN 0-207-14929-1 – via Internet Archive Book Reader.
- Boddington, Matthew. "Shooting Lili: Flying for the Silver Screen." Aeroplane, Volume 37, No. 8, August 2009.
- Wojcik, Pamela Robertson, ed. New Constellations: Movie Stars of the 1960s (Star Decades: American Culture/American Cinema). Piscataway Township, New Jersey: Rutgers University Press, 2011. ISBN 978-0-81355-172-2.
