= The Gifts =

1970 film

- Produced by: Robert McBride
- Narrated by: Lorne Greene
- Music by: Skitch Henderson
- Production company: Richter Productions
- Distributed by: Water Quality Office of the Environmental Protection Agency
- Release date: 1970
- Running time: 28 minutes
- Country: United States
- Language: English

The Gifts is a 1970 American short documentary film about water pollution in the United States. The film was produced by Robert McBride for the United States Environmental Protection Agency. It was nominated for an Academy Award for Best Documentary Short.
