= Deadly Harvest (1972 film) =

1972 American made-for-television film

- Written by: Geoffrey Household; Daniel B. Ullman
- Directed by: Michael O'Herlihy
- Country of origin: United States
- Original language: English

Production
- Running time: 90 minutes

Original release
- Network: CBS
- Release: September 26, 1972

Deadly Harvest is a made for TV movie produced by CBS. It was shown in September 1972 and in July 1973, and not to be confused with Deadly Harvest (2008), a German / South African remake of the German cult film Fleisch (1979).

== Plot ==
Richard Boone, Patty Duke and Michael Constantine star in this suspense drama of a man whose past as a freedom fighter who has defected from an Iron Curtain country, finally catches up with him.

After living quietly in California's wine country under an assumed name, Anton Solea, played by Boone, is suddenly the target of a would be assassin. Patty Duke plays a peace activist who tags along with Solea as he is pursued by the unknown enemy. Constantine plays a neighboring grape grower who lends Solea a helping hand.

== Cast ==
- Richard Boone... Anton Solca
- Patty Duke ... Jenny
- Michael Constantine ... Stefan Groza
- Jack Kruschen... Vartanian
- Murray Hamilton ... Sheriff Bill Jessup
- Jack De Mave ... Franklin
- Bill McKeever ...Deputy Charley
- Richard Roat ... Peterson
- Richard Turner ... Roger
- Fred Maio ... Caretaker
- Josef Rodriquez ... Attendant

== Production ==
Director: Michael O'Herlihy

Writers: Geoffrey Household (1960 novel - Watcher in the Shadows), Daniel B. Ullman

Release Date: 26 September 1972 (USA)

Filmed in the Napa Valley in California.
