= Time Is Running Out (film) =

1970 film

- Directed by: Robert Ménégoz
- Produced by: Horst Dallmayr; Robert Ménégoz
- Production company: Gesellschaft für bildende Filme
- Release date: 1970
- Running time: 33 minutes
- Country: West Germany
- Language: German

Time Is Running Out is a 1970 West German short documentary film directed by Robert Ménégoz. It was nominated for an Academy Award for Best Documentary Short.
