= A Long Way from Nowhere =

1970 film

- Directed by: Bob Aller
- Written by: Jascha Kessler
- Produced by: Bob Aller
- Narrated by: Paul Newman
- Cinematography: Vilmos Zsigmond
- Music by: Lalo Schifrin
- Release date: 1970
- Country: United States
- Language: English

A Long Way from Nowhere is a 1970 American short documentary film produced by Bob Aller. The film traces the progress of four autistic children over one year in a behavioral modification program conducted by psychologist Ivar Lovaas. The sound recording and design was by Gloria Aller. The film was nominated for an Academy Award for Best Documentary Short.
