= Scrooge (1970 film) =

1970 film by Ronald Neame

- Theatrical release poster by Joseph Bowler
- Directed by: Ronald Neame
- Written by: Leslie Bricusse
- Based on: A Christmas Carol; 1843 novella by Charles Dickens
- Produced by: Robert H. Solo
- Starring: Albert Finney; Edith Evans; Kenneth More; Laurence Naismith; Michael Medwin; David Collings; Anton Rodgers; Suzanne Neve; Alec Guinness
- Cinematography: Oswald Morris
- Edited by: Peter Weatherley
- Music by: Leslie Bricusse
- Production company: Cinema Center Films
- Distributed by: National General Pictures (United States); 20th Century Fox (United Kingdom)
- Release date: 5 November 1970
- Running time: 113 minutes
- Countries: United Kingdom; United States
- Language: English
- Budget: $5 million
- Box office: $3 million (rentals)

Scrooge is a 1970 musical film adaptation of Charles Dickens' A Christmas Carol (1843). It was directed by Ronald Neame, and starred Albert Finney as Ebenezer Scrooge. The film's score was composed by Leslie Bricusse and arranged and conducted by Ian Fraser.

The film was a follow-up to another Dickens musical adaptation, 1968's award-winning Oliver!. Both films were shot by Oswald Morris and many of the sets at Shepperton Studios were reused for Scrooge. The posters for Scrooge included the tagline, "What the dickens have they done to Scrooge?", designed to head off any criticism of an all-singing, all-dancing old skinflint. Finney won the Golden Globe Award for Best Actor in a Motion Picture – Musical or Comedy in 1971, and the film received four Academy Award nominations, including for Best Original Song (for "Thank You Very Much").

== Plot ==
On Christmas Eve 1860, in London, mean-spirited sour stingy money-lender Ebenezer Scrooge declines his nephew Harry's invitation for Christmas dinner and reluctantly gives his loyal employee Bob Cratchit Christmas Day off. As Scrooge leaves his office, he declines two gentlemen's offer to collect money for charity. Returning home, Scrooge encounters the ghost of his seven-year-dead business partner Jacob Marley, who reveals that if Scrooge continues his miserly ways, he will be condemned in the afterlife as Marley was, carrying a heavy chain forged by his own selfishness and greed. Before leaving, Marley says that three spirits will visit Scrooge that night.

At one o'clock, Scrooge is visited by the Ghost of Christmas Past, who takes him back in time to Scrooge's childhood and early adult life. They visit his lonely school days, where he is ultimately taken back home by his beloved sister, and then his time as an employee under Mr. Fezziwig. At Fezziwig's Christmas party, Scrooge falls in love with Isabel, Fezziwig's daughter. Scrooge recalls that Isabel had left him when he chose money over her, and asks the spirit to return him.

At two o'clock, Scrooge is visited by the Ghost of Christmas Present and they visit Bob's house to observe the family's Christmas dinner. The spirit hints that Tiny Tim, Bob's ill son, might die. They next visit Harry's Christmas party, where he defends his uncle from his guests' snide remarks, hoping to know a better side to Scrooge. Scrooge is returned home.

At three o'clock, Scrooge is visited by the Ghost of Christmas Yet to Come, who shows him Christmas 1861, and the citizens rejoicing at Scrooge's death. Bob mourns at Tim's grave. Scrooge vows to change his ways as the ghost forces him to fall through his own grave into the caverns of Hell. There, Marley shows him to his ice-bound "office", where he will be "the only man in Hell who's chilly" to serve as Lucifer's personal clerk, just as Scrooge had forced Bob to work in a cold office. Scrooge is adorned with a large chain by four masked devils. He cries for help before waking up in his bedroom.

Scrooge is now gleeful, realizing it is Christmas Day. He decides to bring happiness to London's citizens and goes on a shopping spree, buying food and presents, with the help of children. He runs into Harry and his wife, giving them presents, and accepts their invitation to Christmas dinner. Dressed as "Father Christmas", Scrooge delivers a giant turkey, presents and toys to the Cratchits, promises to double Bob's salary, and pledges to find the best doctors to make Tim better. Scrooge frees his clients from their debts and promises to donate to the portly gentlemens' charity. Scrooge returns home and prepares for dinner with his family.

== Cast ==
- Albert Finney as Ebenezer Scrooge
- Alec Guinness as Jacob Marley
- Edith Evans as the Ghost of Christmas Past
- Kenneth More as the Ghost of Christmas Present
- Paddy Stone as the Ghost of Christmas Yet to Come
- David Collings as Bob Cratchit
- Frances Cuka as Mrs. Cratchit
- Richard Beaumont as "Tiny Tim" Cratchit
- Karen Scargill as Kathy Cratchit
- Michael Medwin as Harry, Scrooge's nephew (In the book he is Fred)
- Mary Peach as Harry's wife
- Gordon Jackson as Tom, Harry's friend
- Anton Rodgers as Tom Jenkins, one of Scrooge's debtors
- Laurence Naismith as Mr. Fezziwig
- Kay Walsh as Mrs. Fezziwig
- Suzanne Neve as Isabel Fezziwig (In the book her name is Belle & is not Fezziwig's daughter)
- Derek Francis as a charity gentleman
- Roy Kinnear as a charity gentleman
- Geoffrey Bayldon as Pringle, the toyshop owner
- Molly Weir as a woman debtor
- Helena Gloag as a woman debtor
- Reg Lever as Miller, the puppeteer
- Keith Marsh as a well-wisher
- Marianne Stone as a party guest

== Musical numbers ==
1. "Overture" (removed from 2011 Blu-ray release)
2. "A Christmas Carol" – Chorus
3. "Christmas Children" – David Collings, Richard Beaumont, & Karen Scargill
4. "I Hate People" – Albert Finney
5. "Father Christmas" – Urchins
6. "See the Phantoms" – Alec Guinness
7. "December the 25th" – Laurence Naismith, Kay Walsh & Ensemble
8. "Happiness" – Suzanne Neve
9. "A Christmas Carol (Reprise)" – Chorus
10. "You...You" – Albert Finney
11. "I Like Life" – Kenneth More & Albert Finney
12. "The Beautiful Day" – Richard Beaumont
13. "Happiness (Reprise)" – Suzanne Neve & Albert Finney
14. "Thank You Very Much" – Anton Rodgers & Ensemble
15. "I'll Begin Again" – Albert Finney
16. "I Like Life (Reprise)" – Albert Finney
17. Finale: "Father Christmas (Reprise)" / "Thank You Very Much (Reprise)" – All
18. "Exit Music" (not included on LP)

A soundtrack album containing all of the songs from the film was issued on Columbia Records in 1970. The album peaked at No. 29 on Billboard's Best Bets For Christmas album chart on 19 December 1970. Due to legal complications, however, the soundtrack has never been re-released in the CD format. The 2011 Paramount Blu-ray release of the film has removed the "Overture" (which is intact on previous VHS and DVD releases).

== Production ==
Finance came from Cinema Center Films.

Albert Finney was offered the lead role but initially turned it down. Richard Harris signed to make the film but then was held up on filming Bloomfield. Rex Harrison was then signed although it meant the producer had to buy him out of a contract for a stage play he was in. Finney then read the script and said he wanted to do the film. The filmmakers wanted Finney rather than Harrison so told Harrison they could not afford to buy him out of the stage contract and went with Finney.

Filmed in London and on location in Buckinghamshire between January and May 1970, the film sets at Shepperton Studios included fully reconstructed Victorian streets. Finney was in his mid-thirties and wore makeup to look older and was able to draw effectively upon his theatrical training and incorporate various vocal inflections and physical mannerisms as the old miser.

=== Title sequence ===
The film features an opening title sequence of hand-painted backgrounds and overlays by British illustrator Ronald Searle. Art of the Title described it, saying, "As is often the case with Searle’s illustrations, the forms jump and squiggle into shape, the strokes loose and sprightly. In each scene, swaths of colour and life pour out, white snowflakes dotting the brush strokes." The illustrations later appeared in the book Scrooge by Elaine Donaldson, published in 1970 by Cinema Center Films.

== Reception ==
=== Box office ===
Scrooge opened on two screens in Los Angeles and Chicago, grossing $36,000 in its opening week. The release expanded two weeks later, including an opening at Radio City Music Hall in New York City, and moved up to second place at the US box office behind Lovers and Other Strangers. The following week it became number one but again fell to second place behind Lovers and Other Strangers for one week before returning to number one for two weeks before Christmas. In its sixth week at Radio City Music Hall it grossed $375,095 for the week, which Variety believed to be the biggest ever single week gross for a theatre worldwide surpassing the record set the previous Christmas by A Boy Named Charlie Brown. Over the course of its initial theatrical release, the film earned $3 million in distributor rentals in the United States and Canada. It was considered a disappointment financially.

=== Critical reception ===
Gene Siskel of The Chicago Tribune awarded the film three-and-a-half stars out of four and praised Finney's "masterful performance". Arthur D. Murphy for Variety called Scrooge "a most delightful film in every way" and praised Finney as "remarkable". He also complimented Bricusse's "unobtrusive complementary music and lyrics; and Ronald Neame's delicately controlled direction which conveys, but does not force, all the inherent warmth, humor and sentimentality." Charles Champlin of the Los Angeles Times applauded Scrooge as a "lovely movie, one of the few genuinely family-wide attractions of the whole year, calculated to please equally all those who have loved the Dickens work forever, and all those enviable youngsters who are about to discover it for the first time."

Roger Ebert of the Chicago Sun-Times gave the film three stars out of four, feeling it "works very nicely on its intended level and the kids sitting near me seemed to be having a good time." However, he criticized Bricusse's songs, writing that they "fall so far below the level of good musical comedy that you wish Albert Finney would stop singing them, until you realize he isn't really singing." Reviewing for the New York Daily News, Ann Guarino wrote Scrooge was "bright with humor and moves along at a lively pace in 19th Century settings." She further praised the cast as "excellent," but described Bricusse's songs as being "pleasant, but unfortunately forgettable with the exception of 'Thank You Very Much'". Vincent Canby of The New York Times called Finney's performance "absurd, sentimental, pretty, never quite as funny as it intends to be, but quite acceptable, if only as a seasonal ritual." Overall, Canby felt the adaptation was "surprisingly faithful", and he complimented Ronald Neame for directing "the movie with all of the delicacy possible after a small story has been turned into a comparatively large, conventional musical. The settings—London streets and interiors, circa 1860 (updated from the original 1843)—are very attractive, somewhat spruced-up variations on the original John Leech illustrations."

Pauline Kael of The New Yorker found Scrooge to be an "innocuous musical version of A Christmas Carol, starring Albert Finney looking glum. The Leslie Bricusse music is so forgettable that your mind flushes it away while you're hearing it." Jay Cocks of Time magazine derided Finney's performance as "drastically disappointing. [He] grumbles and hobbles through his part, employing mannerism instead of nuance." Cocks was also critical of Bricusse's songs, and summarized the film as "a high-budget holiday spectacular, a musical extracted from Dickens' A Christmas Carol that turns out to be a curdled cup of holiday cheer [...] First frame to last, Scrooge is a mechanical movie made with indifference to every quality but the box office receipts."

Among retrospective reviews, James Berardinelli of ReelViews called Scrooge "a harmless, fitfully enjoyable version of the timeless classic". He felt Finney belonged "somewhere in the middle of the pack with this hammy, albeit enjoyable, portrayal", but nevertheless felt Alec Guinness gave a "standout performance". Derek Winnert noted that the "lame script but thoughtful handling produce an upmarket, good-looking film that impresses without exciting greatly." Author Fred Guida called it one of the most underrated adaptions of the book.

On the review aggregator website Rotten Tomatoes, 74% of 19 critics' reviews are positive. Metacritic, which uses a weighted average, assigned the film a score of 58 out of 100, based on 8 critics, indicating "mixed or average" reviews.

== Accolades ==
The film was nominated for Best Original Song Score, and "Thank You Very Much" for Best Original Song, though it failed to win in either category. It also received nominations, but no Oscars, for Best Art Direction/Set Decoration and Best Costume Design.

Award	Category	Nominee(s)	Result
Academy Awards	Best Art Direction	Art Direction: Terence Marsh and Robert Cartwright; Set Decoration: Pamela Cornell	Nominated
Academy Awards	Best Costume Design	Margaret Furse	Nominated
Academy Awards	Best Original Song Score	Music and Lyrics by Leslie Bricusse; Adapted by Ian Fraser and Herbert W. Spencer	Nominated
Academy Awards	Best Song – Original for the Picture	"Thank You Very Much"; Music and Lyrics by Leslie Bricusse	Nominated
British Academy Film Awards	Best Art Direction	Terence Marsh	Nominated
Golden Globe Awards	Best Motion Picture – Musical or Comedy	Scrooge	Nominated
Golden Globe Awards	Best Actor in a Motion Picture – Musical or Comedy	Albert Finney	Won
Golden Globe Awards	Best Screenplay	Leslie Bricusse	Nominated
Golden Globe Awards	Best Original Score – Motion Picture	Leslie Bricusse	Nominated
Golden Globe Awards	Best Original Song – Motion Picture	"Thank You Very Much"; Music and Lyrics by Leslie Bricusse	Nominated
Laurel Awards	Best Male Comedy Performance	Albert Finney	Nominated

== Adaptations ==
=== Stage ===
In 1992, a stage musical adapted from the film, featuring Bricusse's songs and starring Anthony Newley, was mounted in the UK under the title Scrooge: The Musical. "I Hate People" was re-written as "I Hate Christmas", and a cast recording was released.

The stage adaptation was mounted in Melbourne, Australia, in 1993, starring Keith Michell, Max Gillies, Tony Taylor, William Zappa, Dale Burridge, Emma Raciti, Ross Hannaford, Paul Cheyne, and Glenda Walsh.

The show was revived in 2003 on a tour of the UK by British song and dance man Tommy Steele, and he reprised the role at the London Palladium in 2004, making him the performer to have done the most shows at the Palladium. In 2007, Shane Richie starred at the Manchester Palace. It was revived once more at the London Palladium from October 2012 to 5 January 2013, with Steele again in the title role.

=== Animated film ===
In 2022, following a limited theatrical release in the United States, an animated remake, titled Scrooge: A Christmas Carol, was released by Netflix. Produced by Timeless Films (Monster Family), and written and directed by Stephen Donnelly, the remake incorporates many of Bricusse's songs from the 1970 film, but has a newly-written book. It features the vocal talents of Luke Evans as Scrooge, Johnny Flynn as Bob Cratchit, Fra Fee as Harry, Giles Terera as Tom, Olivia Colman as the Ghost of Christmas Past, James Cosmo as Fezziwig, Jessie Buckley as Isabel, Trevor Dion Nicholas as the Ghost of Christmas Present, and Jonathan Pryce as Jacob Marley.

== See also ==
- List of A Christmas Carol adaptations
- List of Christmas films
- List of ghost films
- Pickwick, a 1963 musical with lyrics by Bricusse, also based on Dickens
