= John Bramall =

English sound engineer

- Born: John Ewart Bramal; 18 August 1923; Stoke-on-Trent, England
- Died: 13 June 2000 (aged 76); Somerset, England
- Occupation: Sound engineer
- Years active: 1951 – 1986

John Bramall (18 August 1923 – 13 June 2000) was an English sound engineer. He was nominated for an Academy Award in the category Best Sound for the film Ryan's Daughter.

== Selected filmography ==
- Ryan's Daughter (1970; co-nominated with Gordon McCallum)
