= Terence Marsh =

British production designer

- Born: 14 November 1931; London, England
- Died: 9 January 2018 (aged 86); Pacific Palisades, California, U.S.
- Other name: Terry Marsh
- Occupation: Production designer
- Years active: 1955–2001

Terence Marsh (14 November 1931 – 9 January 2018) was a British production designer. He won two Academy Awards and was nominated for another two in the category of Best Art Direction.

== Production designer ==
- Rush Hour 2 (2001)
- The Green Mile (1999)
- The Shawshank Redemption (1994)
- Clear and Present Danger (1994)
- Basic Instinct (1992)
- Havana (1990)
- The Hunt for Red October (1990)
- Bert Rigby, You're a Fool (1989)
- Haunted Honeymoon (1986) (also co-writer)
- To Be or Not to Be (1983)
- The World's Greatest Lover (1977)
- A Bridge Too Far (1977)
- The Adventure of Sherlock Holmes' Smarter Brother (1975)
- The Glass Menagerie (1973) (TV)
- The MacKintosh Man (1973) (as Terry Marsh)
- A Touch of Class (1973)
- Perfect Friday (1970)

== Awards ==
Marsh won two Academy Awards for Best Art Direction and was nominated for two more:

Won

- Doctor Zhivago (1965)
- Oliver! (1968)

Nominated

- Scrooge (1970)
- Mary, Queen of Scots (1971)

He has also been nominated for three BAFTA Awards for Best Production Design:

- Scrooge (1970)
- A Bridge Too Far (1977)
- The Hunt for Red October (1990)
