= 28th Golden Globe Awards =

Film award ceremony in 1971

- Date: February 5, 1971

The 28th Golden Globe Awards, honoring the best in film and television for 1970, were held on February 5, 1971.

== Winners and nominees ==
=== Film ===
Best Motion Picture
Drama	Comedy or Musical
Love Story; Airport; Five Easy Pieces; I Never Sang for My Father; Patton	M*A*S*H; Darling Lili; Diary of a Mad Housewife; Lovers and Other Strangers; Scrooge
Best Performance in a Motion Picture – Drama
Actor	Actress
George C. Scott – Patton as George S. Patton; Melvyn Douglas – I Never Sang for My Father as Tom Garrison; James Earl Jones – The Great White Hope as Jack Jefferson; Jack Nicholson – Five Easy Pieces as Robert Eroica Dupea; Ryan O'Neal – Love Story as Oliver Barret IV	Ali MacGraw – Love Story as Jennifer Cavalleri; Faye Dunaway – Puzzle of a Downfall Child as Lou Andreas Sand; Glenda Jackson – Women in Love as Gudrun Brangwen; Melina Mercouri – Promise at Dawn as Nina Kacew; Sarah Miles – Ryan's Daughter as Rosy Ryan
Best Performance in a Motion Picture – Comedy or Musical
Actor	Actress
Albert Finney – Scrooge as Ebenezer Scrooge; Richard Benjamin – Diary of a Mad Housewife as Jonathan Balser; Elliott Gould – M*A*S*H as Captain John "Trapper" McIntyre; Jack Lemmon – The Out-of-Towners as George Kellerman; Donald Sutherland – M*A*S*H as Captain Benjamin "Hawkeye" Pierce	Carrie Snodgress – Diary of a Mad Housewife as Tina Balser; Julie Andrews – Darling Lili as Lili Smith; Sandy Dennis – The Out-of-Towners as Gwen Kellerman; Angela Lansbury – Something for Everyone as Countess Erthe Van Orstein; Barbra Streisand – The Owl and the Pussycat as Doris
Best Supporting Performance in a Motion Picture – Drama, Comedy or Musical
Supporting Actor	Supporting Actress
John Mills – Ryan's Daughter as Michael; Chief Dan George – Little Big Man as Old Lodge Skins; Trevor Howard – Ryan's Daughter as Father Collins; George Kennedy – Airport as Joe Patroni; John Marley – Love Story as Phil Cavalleri	Karen Black – Five Easy Pieces as Rayette Dipesto; Maureen Stapleton – Airport as Inez Guerrero; Tina Chen – The Hawaiians as Nyuk Tsin; Lee Grant – The Landlord as Joyce Enders; Sally Kellerman – M*A*S*H as Margaret O'Houlihan
Other
Best Director	Best Screenplay
Arthur Hiller – Love Story; Robert Altman – M*A*S*H; Bob Rafelson – Five Easy Pieces; Ken Russell – Women in Love; Franklin J. Schaffner – Patton	Love Story – Erich Segal; Five Easy Pieces – Carole Eastman and Bob Rafelson; Husbands – John Cassavetes; M*A*S*H – Ring Lardner, Jr.; Scrooge – Leslie Bricusse
Best Original Score	Best Original Song
Love Story – Francis Lai; Airport – Alfred Newman; Cromwell – Frank Cordell; Scrooge – Leslie Bricusse, Ian Fraser and Herbert W. Spencer; Wuthering Heights – Michel Legrand	"Whistling Away the Dark" (Henry Mancini, Johnny Mercer) – Darling Lili; "Ballad of Little Fauss and Big Halsy" (Carl Perkins, Johnny Cash) – Little Fauss and Big Halsy; "Pieces of Dreams" (Michel Legrand, Alan and Marilyn Bergman) – Pieces of Dreams; "Thank You Very Much" (Leslie Bricusse) – Scrooge; "Till Love Touches Your Life" (Riz Ortolani, Arthur Hamilton) – Madron
Best Foreign Film (English Language)	Best Foreign Film (Foreign Language)
Women in Love (United Kingdom); The Act of the Heart (Canada); Bloomfield (United Kingdom/Israel); One Soldier's Gamble (Japan); The Virgin and the Gypsy (United Kingdom)	Rider on the Rain (France); Borsalino (France/Italy); The Confession (France); Customer of the Off Season (France/Israel); Investigation of a Citizen Above Suspicion (Italy)
New Star of the Year – Actor	New Star of the Year – Actress
James Earl Jones – The Great White Hope as Jack Jefferson; Assaf Dayan – Promise at Dawn as Romain (age 25); Frank Langella – Diary of a Mad Housewife as George Prager; Joe Namath – Norwood as Joe; Kenneth Nelson – The Boys in the Band as Michael	Carrie Snodgress – Diary of a Mad Housewife as Tina Balser; Jane Alexander – The Great White Hope as Eleanor Bachman; Anna Calder-Marshall – Pussycat, Pussycat, I Love You as Millie; Marlo Thomas – Jenny as Jenny; Angel Tompkins – I Love My Wife as Helene Donnelly

The following films received multiple nominations:

Nominations	Title
7	Love Story
6	M*A*S*H
5	Diary of a Mad Housewife
5	Five Easy Pieces
5	Scrooge
4	Airport
3	Darling Lili
3	Patton
3	Ryan's Daughter
3	Women in Love
2	The Great White Hope
2	I Never Sang for My Father
2	The Out-of-Towners
2	Promise at Dawn

The following films received multiple wins:

Wins	Title
5	Love Story
2	Diary of a Mad Housewife

=== Television ===
Best Television Series
Drama	Musical or Comedy
Medical Center: The Bold Ones: The Senator; Marcus Welby, M.D.; The Mod Squad; The Young Lawyers	The Carol Burnett Show: The Courtship of Eddie's Father; Family Affair; The Glen Campbell Goodtime Hour; The Partridge Family
Best Performance in a Television Series Drama
Actor	Actress
Peter Graves - Mission: Impossible as Jim Phelps: Mike Connors - Mannix as Joe Mannix; Chad Everett - Medical Center as Dr. Joe Gannon; Burt Reynolds - Dan August as Lt. Dan August; Robert Young - Marcus Welby, M.D. as Dr. Marcus Welby	Peggy Lipton - The Mod Squad as Julie Barnes: Amanda Blake - Gunsmoke as Miss Kitty Russell; Linda Cristal - The High Chaparral as Victoria Montoya; Yvette Mimieux - The Most Deadly Game as Vannessa Smith; Denise Nicholas - Room 222 as Miss Liz McIntyre
Best Performance in a Television Series – Musical or Comedy
Actor	Actress
Flip Wilson - The Flip Wilson Show as Various Characters: Herschel Bernardi - Arnie as Arnie Nuvo; David Frost - The David Frost Show as Himself; Merv Griffin - The Merv Griffin Show as Himself; Danny Thomas - Make Room for Granddaddy as Danny Williams	Mary Tyler Moore - The Mary Tyler Moore Show as Mary Richards: Carol Burnett - The Carol Burnett Show as Various Characters; Shirley Jones - The Partridge Family as Shirley Partridge; Juliet Mills - Nanny and the Professor as Nanny Phoebe Figgalily; Elizabeth Montgomery - Bewitched as Samantha Stephens
Best Supporting Performance in a Series, Miniseries or Television Film
Supporting Actor	Supporting Actress
James Brolin - Marcus Welby, M.D. as Dr. Steven Kiley: Tige Andrews - The Mod Squad as Captain Adam Greer; Michael Constantine - Room 222 as Seymour Kaufman; Henry Gibson - Rowan & Martin's Laugh-In as Various Characters; Zalman King - The Young Lawyers as Aaron Silverman	Gail Fisher - Mannix as Peggy Fair: Sue Ane Langdon - Arnie as Lilian Nuvo; Miyoshi Umeki - The Courtship of Eddie's Father as Mrs. Livingston; Karen Valentine - Room 222 as Miss Alice Johnson; Lesley Ann Warren - Mission: Impossible as Dana Lambert

The following programs received multiple nominations:

Nominations	Title
3	Marcus Welby, M.D.
3	The Mod Squad
3	Room 222
2	Arnie
2	The Carol Burnett Show
2	The Courtship of Eddie's Father
2	Mannix
2	Medical Center
2	Mission: Impossible
2	The Partridge Family
2	The Young Lawyers

=== Cecil B. DeMille Award ===
Frank Sinatra
