= Pamela Cornell =

British set decorator (1928–1987)

Pamela Joyce Cornell
- Born: 28 November 1928; Headington, England
- Died: 1987; London, England
- Occupation: Set decorator
- Years active: 1960–1985

Pamela Cornell (28 November 1928 – January 1987) was a British set decorator. She was nominated for an Academy Award in the category Best Art Direction for the film Scrooge.

Cornell was also an artist, with many of her works being displayed overseas.

Cornell died in London in January 1987, aged 58.

== Selected filmography ==
- Scrooge (1970)
