= Madron (film) =

1970 film

- Directed by: Jerry Hopper
- Screenplay by: Leo McMahon; Edward Chappell
- Story by: Leo McMahon
- Produced by: Emanuel Henigman; Eric Weaver; Zev Braun (executive producer)
- Starring: Richard Boone; Leslie Caron
- Cinematography: Adam Greenberg; Marcel Grignon
- Edited by: Renzo Lucidi
- Music by: Riz Ortolani
- Production company: G.B.C.-Edric-Isracine Productions
- Distributed by: Four Star-Excelsior
- Release date: December 1970
- Running time: 90 minutes
- Country: United States
- Language: English

Madron is a 1970 Western film directed by Jerry Hopper, his final film before his death. Filmed in Israel, the first feature shot in Israel that was set in a non-Israeli location, it was nominated for an Academy Award for Best Original Song and a Golden Globe Award for Best Original Song in 1971 for the song "Till Love Touches Your Life" by Riz Ortolani (music) and Arthur Hamilton.

== Plot ==
A nun, the only survivor of an Indian massacre of a wagon train, is taken in by a cantankerous old gunfighter who helps her to evade the marauding Indians during her attempt to reach Santa Fe. During the arduous journey they slowly develop an unlikely friendship and respect for each other despite Madron (Richard Boone) initially treating Sister Mary (Leslie Caron) very badly.

== Cast ==
- Richard Boone as Madron
- Leslie Caron as Sister Mary
- Gabi Amrani (credited as Gabi Armani) as Angel
- Paul L. Smith as Gabe Price
- Aharon Ipalé as Singer
