= List of Academy Award winners and nominees from Japan =

List of Japanese Academy Award winners and nominees
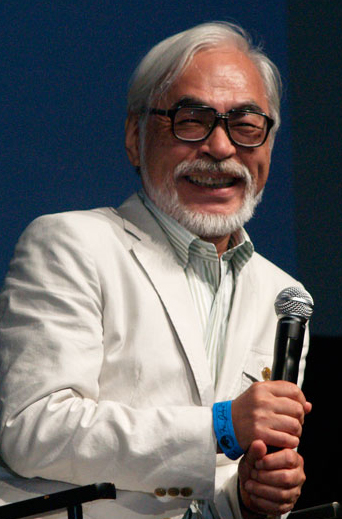
- Hayao Miyazaki (pictured in 2012) has won two Academy Awards for Best Animated Feature category.
Awards and nominations
Award	Wins	Nominations
Picture	0	1
Director	0	3
Supporting Actor	0	4
Supporting Actress	1	2
Adapted Screenplay	0	1
Animated Feature	2	9
Animated Short Film	1	5
International Feature Film	5	18
Cinematography	0	2
Production Design	0	6
Costume Design	3	7
Makeup and Hairstyling	2	5
Original Score	1	2
Original Song	0	1
Visual Effects	1	1

Totals
- Wins: 16
- Nominations: 67
- Honours: 2

This article is a list of Japanese people working in the cinema industry who have been nominated for or won an Academy Award. These include artists and filmmakers, both naturalized and international co-citizenship, or Japanese film production companies are awarded or honored by the Academy.

In the 1950s, just as after the second World War ended prior in five years, Akira Kurosawa was recognized by the Academy for his contribution as a writer/director of Rashomon (1951), which was received Best Foreign Language Film, and again in 1954 and 1955, Gate of Hell and Samurai, The Legend of Musashi also won the same category; it wasn't established yet as competitive until 1956; Departures (2008) and Drive My Car (2021) ultimately won that category in competitive, making it the most wins and nominations of any Asian countries.

In addition of Japanese people aside from Best Foreign Language Film category, these were the first-time winners for each respective categories: Sanzō Wada is the first Japanese and Asian to be nominated for and to win Best Costume Design in 1954, Miyoshi Umeki is the first Japanese and Asian to be nominated for and to win Best Supporting Actress in 1957, Ryuichi Sakamoto is the first Japanese and Asian to win Best Original Score in 1987, Hayao Miyazaki is the first Japanese and Asian animator to be nominated for and to win Best Animated Feature in 2002, Kunio Katō is the first Japanese to win Best Animated Short Film in 2008, Kazu Hiro is the first and only Japanese to be nominated for and to win Best Makeup and Hairstyling between 2006 and 2017, and Takashi Yamazaki and his Shirogumi crew (consists Kiyoko Shibuya, Masaki Takahashi, and Tatsuji Nojima) were the first Japanese crew to be nominated for and to win Best Visual Effects in 2023.

As of 2024, Miyazaki and Hiro are the only two-time competitive winners for their respective categories.

Drive My Car is the first Japanese film to be nominated for the Academy Award for Best Picture.

== Production ==
=== Best Picture ===
Best Picture
Year	Film	Nominee	Status	Notes
2021	Drive My Car	Teruhisa Yamamoto	Nominated	First Japanese film to be nominated for Best Picture.

=== Best Animated Feature ===
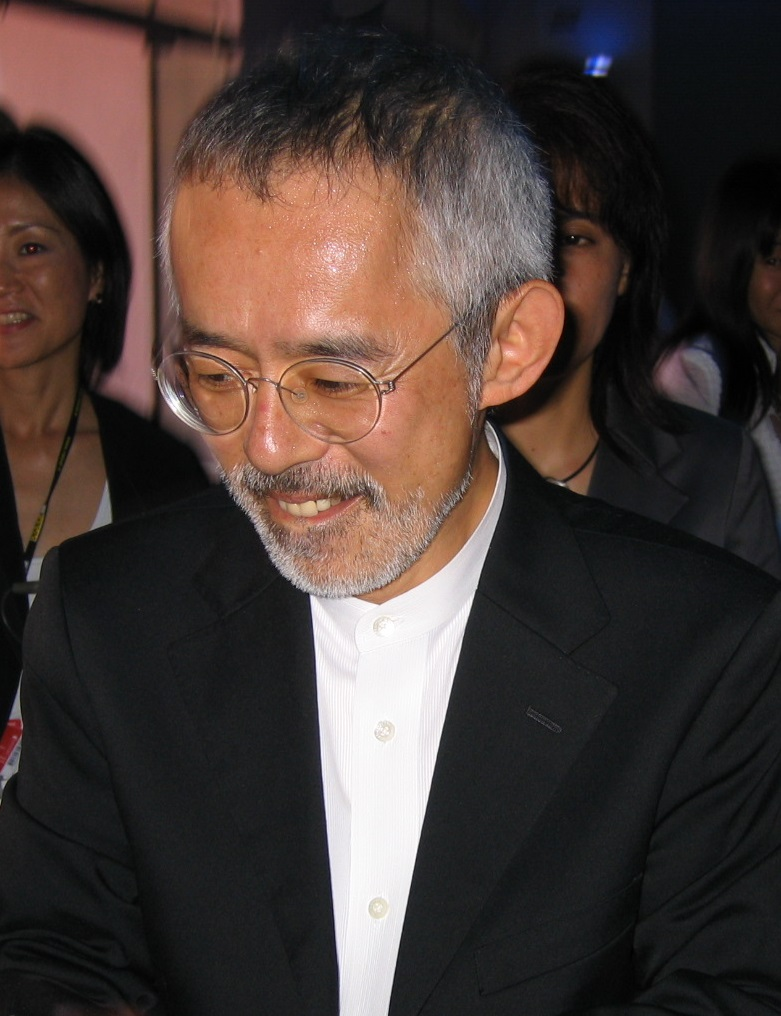
Toshio Suzuki won Best Animated Feature (with Hayao Miyazaki) in 2023, following two earlier nominations.

Best Animated Feature
Year	Name	Film	Status	Notes
2002	Hayao Miyazaki	Spirited Away	Won	Japanese descent. First Asian nominated for Best Animated Feature. First Asian to win Best Animated Feature. First hand drawn film to win Best Animated Feature.
2005	Hayao Miyazaki	Howl's Moving Castle	Nominated	
2013	Hayao Miyazaki; Toshio Suzuki	The Wind Rises	Nominated	Suzuki is of Japanese descent.
2014	Isao Takahata; Yoshiaki Nishimura	The Tale of the Princess Kaguya	Nominated	Both are of Japanese descent.
2015	Hiromasa Yonebayashi; Yoshiaki Nishimura	When Marnie Was There	Nominated	Yonebayashi is of Japanese descent.
2016	Toshio Suzuki	The Red Turtle	Nominated	(Shared with Michael Dudok de Wit.)
2017	Ramsey Naito	The Boss Baby	Nominated	Japanese father. (Shared with Tom McGrath.)
2018	Mamoru Hosoda; Yuichiro Saito	Mirai	Nominated	
2023	Hayao Miyazaki; Toshio Suzuki	The Boy and the Heron	Won	At age 83, Hayao Miyazaki is the oldest winner of Best Animated Feature. Miyazaki is the first Japanese person to win in the category twice. Tied (with Pete Docter) for the most nominations in this category, with four.

=== Best Animated Short Film ===
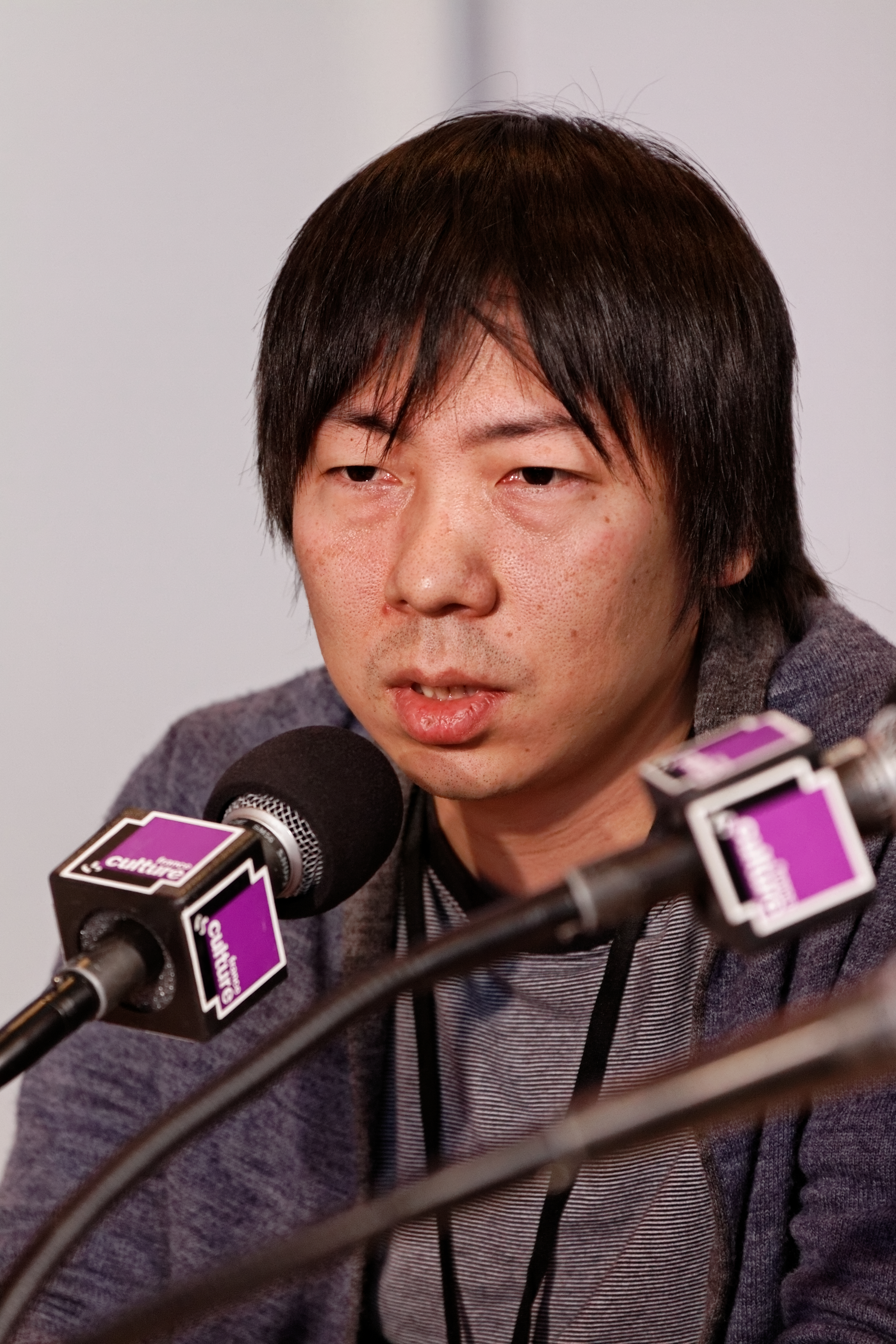
Kunio Katô won the Best Animated Short Film category.

Animated Short Film
Year	Name	Film	Status	Notes
2002	Kōji Yamamura	Mt. Head	Nominated	Japanese descent.
2008	Kunio Katō	La Maison En Petits Cubes	Won	Japanese descent. First Asian to win Best Animated Short Film.
2013	Shuhei Morita	Possessions	Nominated	Japanese descent.
2014	Daisuke Tsutsumi	The Dam Keeper	Nominated	(Shared with Robert Kondo.)
2018	Ru Kuwahata	Negative Space	Nominated	(Shared with Max Porter.)
2024	Daisuke Nishio; Takashi Washio	Magic Candies	Nominated	

=== Best Documentary Feature FIlm ===
Documentary Feature Film
Year (Ceremony)	Film	Director	Result
2024 (97th)	Black Box Diaries	Shiori Itō	Nominated

=== Best Documentary Short Film ===
Documentary Short Film
Year (Ceremony)	Film	Director	Result
2024 (97th)	Instruments of a Beating Heart	Ema Ryan Yamazaki	Nominated

=== International Feature Film ===
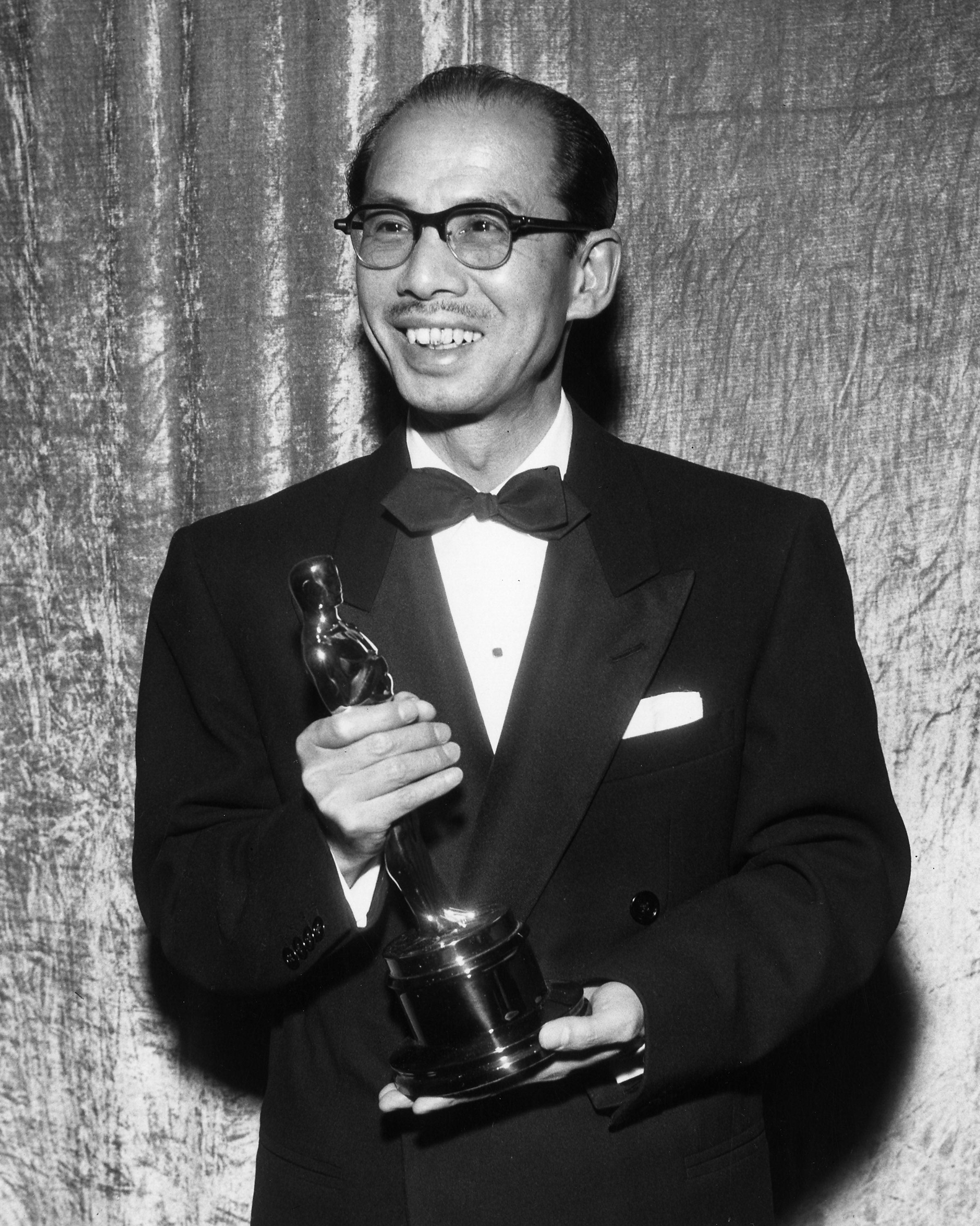
Masaichi Nagata received the Best Foreign Language Film category for Gate of Hell at the 27th Academy Awards.

This category is awarded to countries, not individuals. This list contains directors of nominated films who typically accept the award on behalf of their country.

International Feature Film
Year	Film	Original title	Director	Result
1951 (24th)	Rashomon	Rashōmon (羅生門)	Akira Kurosawa	Honorary Award
1954 (27th)	Gate of Hell	Jigokumon (地獄門)	Teinosuke Kinugasa	Honorary Award
1955 (28th)	Samurai, The Legend of Musashi	Miyamoto Musashi (宮本武蔵)	Hiroshi Inagaki	Honorary Award
1956 (29th)	Harp of Burma	Biruma no Tategoto (ビルマの竪琴)	Kon Ichikawa	Nominated
1961 (34th)	Immortal Love	Eien no Hito (永遠の人)	Keisuke Kinoshita	Nominated
1963 (36th)	Twin Sisters of Kyoto	Koto (古都)	Noboru Nakamura	Nominated
1964 (37th)	Woman in the Dunes	Suna no Onna (砂の女)	Hiroshi Teshigahara	Nominated
1965 (38th)	Kwaidan	Kaidan (怪談)	Masaki Kobayashi	Nominated
1967 (40th)	Portrait of Chieko	Chieko-sho (智恵子抄)	Noboru Nakamura	Nominated
1971 (44th)	Dodes'ka-den	Dodes'ka-den (どですかでん)	Akira Kurosawa	Nominated
1975 (48th)	Sandakan No. 8	Sandakan Hachibanshokan Bohkyo (サンダカン八番娼館 望郷)	Kei Kumai	Nominated
1980 (53rd)	Kagemusha (The Shadow Warrior)	Kagemusha (影武者)	Akira Kurosawa	Nominated
1981 (54th)	Muddy River	Doro no Kawa (泥の河)	Kōhei Oguri	Nominated
2003 (76th)	The Twilight Samurai	Tasogare Seibei (たそがれ清兵衛)	Yoji Yamada	Nominated
2008 (81st)	Departures	Okuribito (おくりびと)	Yōjirō Takita	Won
2018 (91st)	Shoplifters	Manbiki Kazoku (万引き家族)	Hirokazu Kore-eda	Nominated
2021 (94th)	Drive My Car	Doraibu mai kā (ドライブ・マイ・カー)	Ryusuke Hamaguchi	Won
2023 (96th)	Perfect Days		Wim Winders	Nominated

== Performance ==
=== Best Supporting Actor ===
Best Actor in a Supporting Role
Year	Name	Film	Role	Status	Milestone / Notes
1957	Sessue Hayakawa	The Bridge on the River Kwai	Colonel Saito	Nominated	Japanese descent. First Asian man to be nominated for an acting Academy Award.
1966	Mako Iwamatsu	The Sand Pebbles	Po-Han	Nominated	Japanese descent.
1985	Pat Morita	The Karate Kid	Mr. Miyagi	Nominated	Japanese descent.
2003	Ken Watanabe	The Last Samurai	Lord Katsumoto	Nominated	Japanese descent.

=== Best Supporting Actress ===
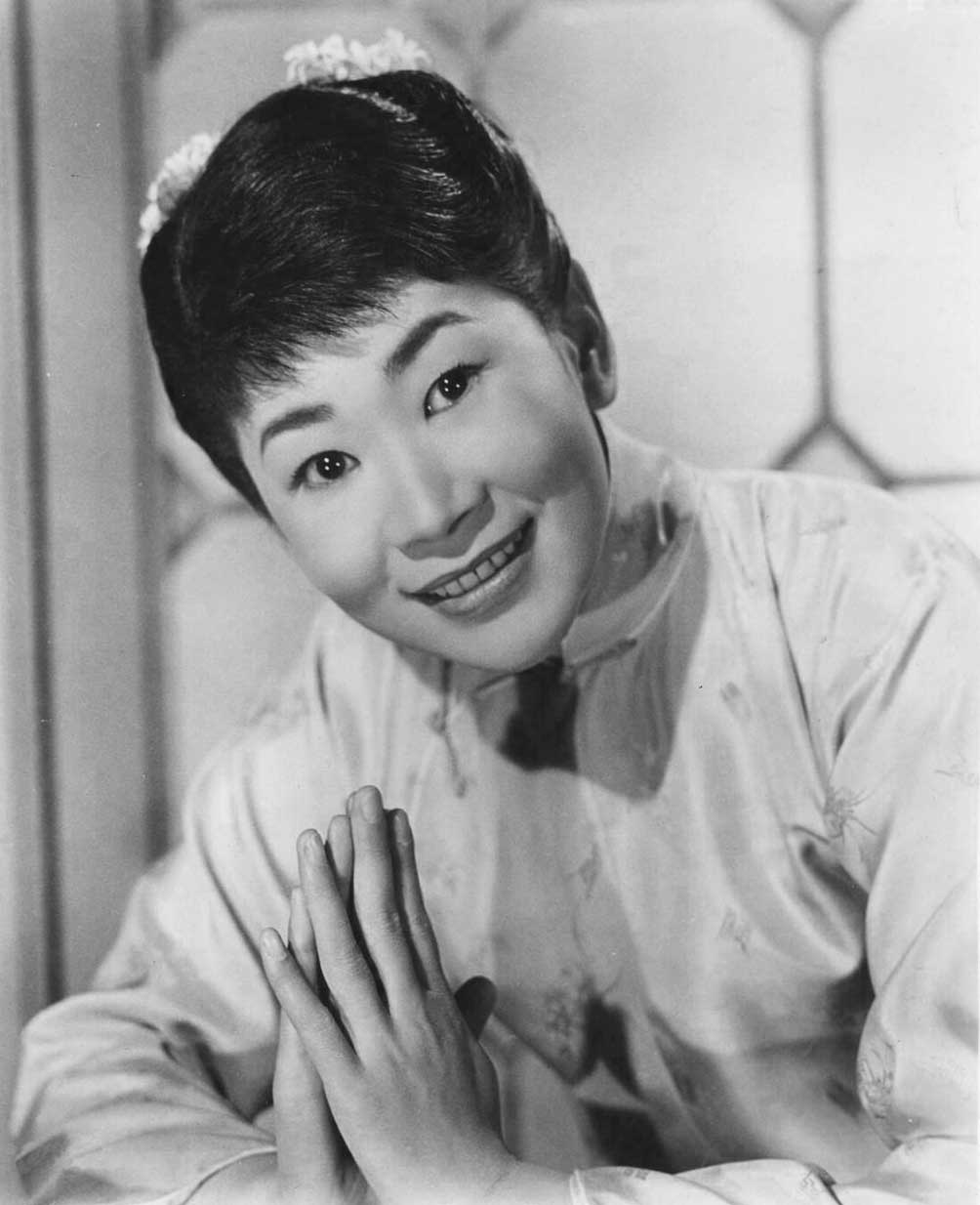
Miyoshi Umeki was the first Japanese and Asian to win in any acting category.

Best Actress in a Supporting Role
Year	Name	Film	Role	Status	Milestone / Notes
1957	Miyoshi Umeki	Sayonara	Katsumi Kelly	Won	Japanese descent. First Asian nominated for Best Supporting Actress; First East Asian to win an acting award.
2006	Rinko Kikuchi	Babel	Chieko Wataya	Nominated	Japanese descent. First role that used Japanese sign language to ever be nominated.

== Craft ==
=== Best Director ===
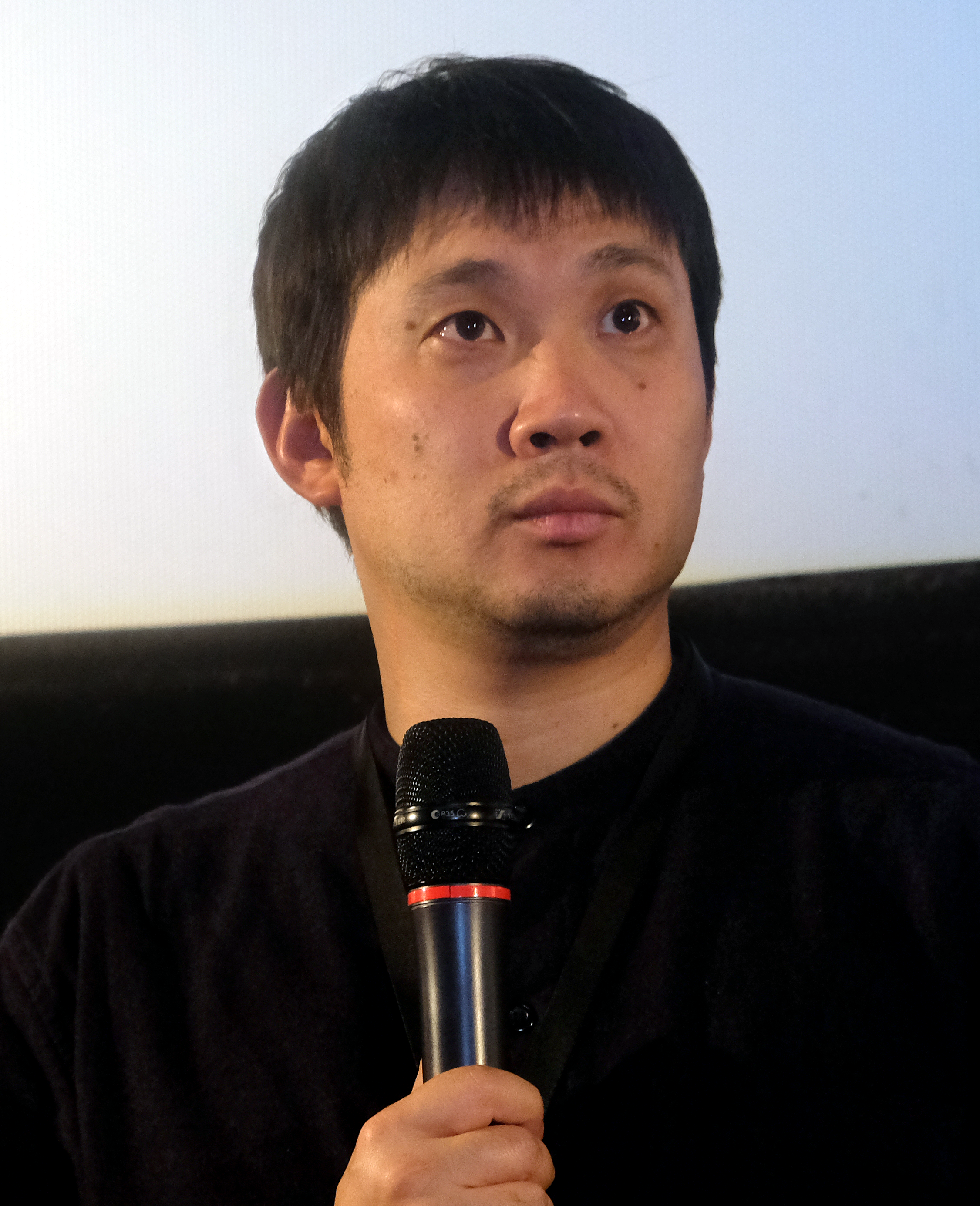
Ryusuke Hamaguchi was nominated for Best Director.

Director
Year	Name	Film	Status	Notes
1965	Hiroshi Teshigahara	Woman in the Dunes	Nominated	Japanese descent. First Asian nominated for Best Director. Film was nominated in previous year for Best Foreign Language Film.
1985	Akira Kurosawa	Ran	Nominated	
2021	Ryusuke Hamaguchi	Drive My Car	Nominated	

=== Best Adapted Screenplay ===
Adapted Screenplay
Year	Name	Film	Status	Notes
2021	Ryusuke Hamaguchi; Takamasa Oe	Drive My Car	Nominated	First Japanese film nominated in a screenplay category.

=== Best Cinematography ===
Cinematography
Year	Name	Film	Status	Notes
1970	Osamu Furuya; Shinsaku Himeda; Masamichi Satoh	Tora! Tora! Tora!	Nominated	All three are of Japanese descent. (Shared with Charles F. Wheeler.)
1985	Takao Saito; Masaharu Ueda; Asakazu Nakai	Ran	Nominated	All three are of Japanese descent

=== Best Production Design ===
Production Design
Year	Name	Film	Status	Notes
1952	So Matsuyama; H. Motsumoto	Rashomon	Nominated	Both are of Japanese descent. First Asians nominated for Best Art Direction.
1956	Albert Nozaki	The Ten Commandments	Nominated	Japanese descent. (Shared with Hal Pereira, Walter H. Tyler, Samuel M. Comer, and Ray Moyer.)
1956	So Matsuyama	Seven Samurai	Nominated	
1970	Yoshirō Muraki; Taizô Kawashima	Tora! Tora! Tora!	Nominated	Both are of Japanese descent. (Shared with Jack Martin Smith, Richard Day, Walter M. Scott, Norman Rockett, and Carl Biddiscombe.)
1980	Yoshirō Muraki	Kagemusha	Nominated	
1985	Yoshirō Muraki; Shinobu Muraki	Ran	Nominated	Muraki is of Japanese descent.

=== Best Costume Design ===
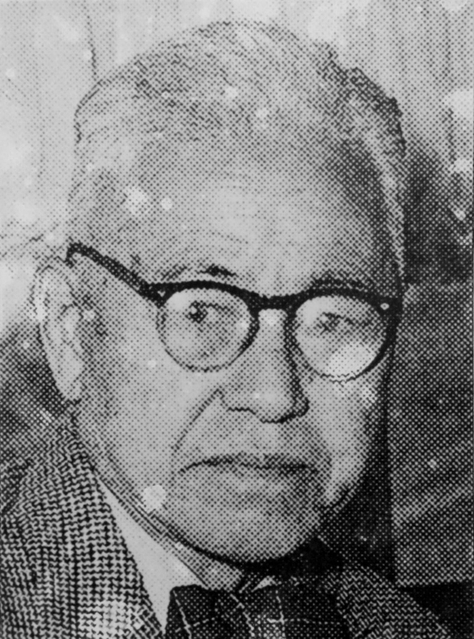
Sanzō Wada won the Best Costume Design category.

Costume Design
Year	Name	Film	Status	Notes
1954	Sanzo Wada	Gate of Hell	Won	Japanese descent. First Asian nominated for Best Costume Design. First Asian to win Best Costume Design.
1955	Tadaoto Kainosho	Ugetsu	Nominated	Japanese descent.
1956	Kohei Ezaki	Seven Samurai	Nominated	Japanese descent.
1961	Yoshirō Muraki	Yojimbo	Nominated	Tied for third most Oscar-nominated Asian of all time, with four nominations.
1985	Emi Wada	Ran	Won	Japanese descent.
1992	Eiko Ishioka	Bram Stoker's Dracula	Won	Japanese descent.
2012	Eiko Ishioka	Mirror Mirror	Nominated	Posthumous nomination.

=== Best Makeup and Hairstyling ===
Best Makeup and Hairstyling
Year	Name	Film	Status	Notes
2006	Kazu Hiro	Click	Nominated	Japanese descent. First Asian nominated for Best Makeup and Hairstyling. (Shared with Bill Corso.)
2007	Kazu Hiro	Norbit	Nominated	(Shared with Rick Baker.)
2017	Kazu Hiro	Darkest Hour	Won	First Asian to win for Best Makeup and Hairstyling. (Shared with David Malinowski and Lucy Sibbick.)
2019	Kazu Hiro	Bombshell	Won	(Shared with Anne Morgan and Vivian Baker.)
2023	Kazu Hiro	Maestro	Nominated	(Shared with Kay Georgiou and Lori McCoy-Bell.)
2025	Kazu Hiro	The Smashing Machine	Nominated	(Shared with Glen Griffin and Bjoern Rehbein.)
2025	Kyoko Toyokawa; Naomi Hibino; Tadashi Nishimatsu	Kokuho	Nominated	

=== Best Original Score ===
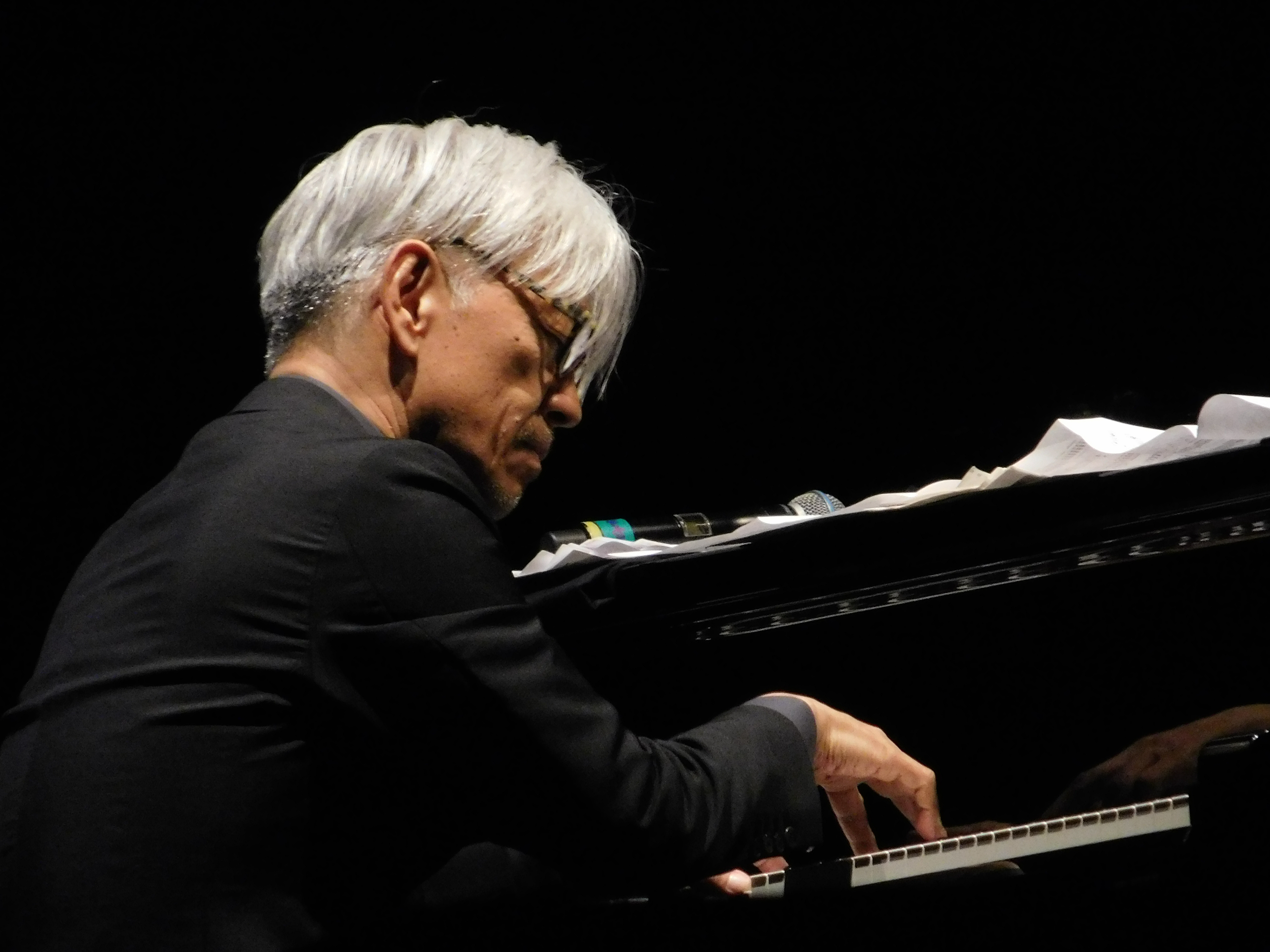
Ryuichi Sakamoto is the first Japanese to win Best Original Score category.

Best Original Score
Year	Name	Film	Status	Notes
1966	Toshiro Mayuzumi	The Bible	Nominated	Japanese descent First Asian nominated for Best Original Score.
1987	Ryuichi Sakamoto	The Last Emperor	Won	(Shared with Cong Su and David Byrne); Japanese descent Sakamoto and Su were the first Asians to win Best Original Score

=== Best Original Song ===
Best Original Song
Year	Name	Film	Song	Status	Notes
2022	Mitski	Everything Everywhere All at Once	"This is a Life"	Nominated	Japanese descent (Shared with Ryan Lott & David Byrne)

=== Best Visual Effects ===
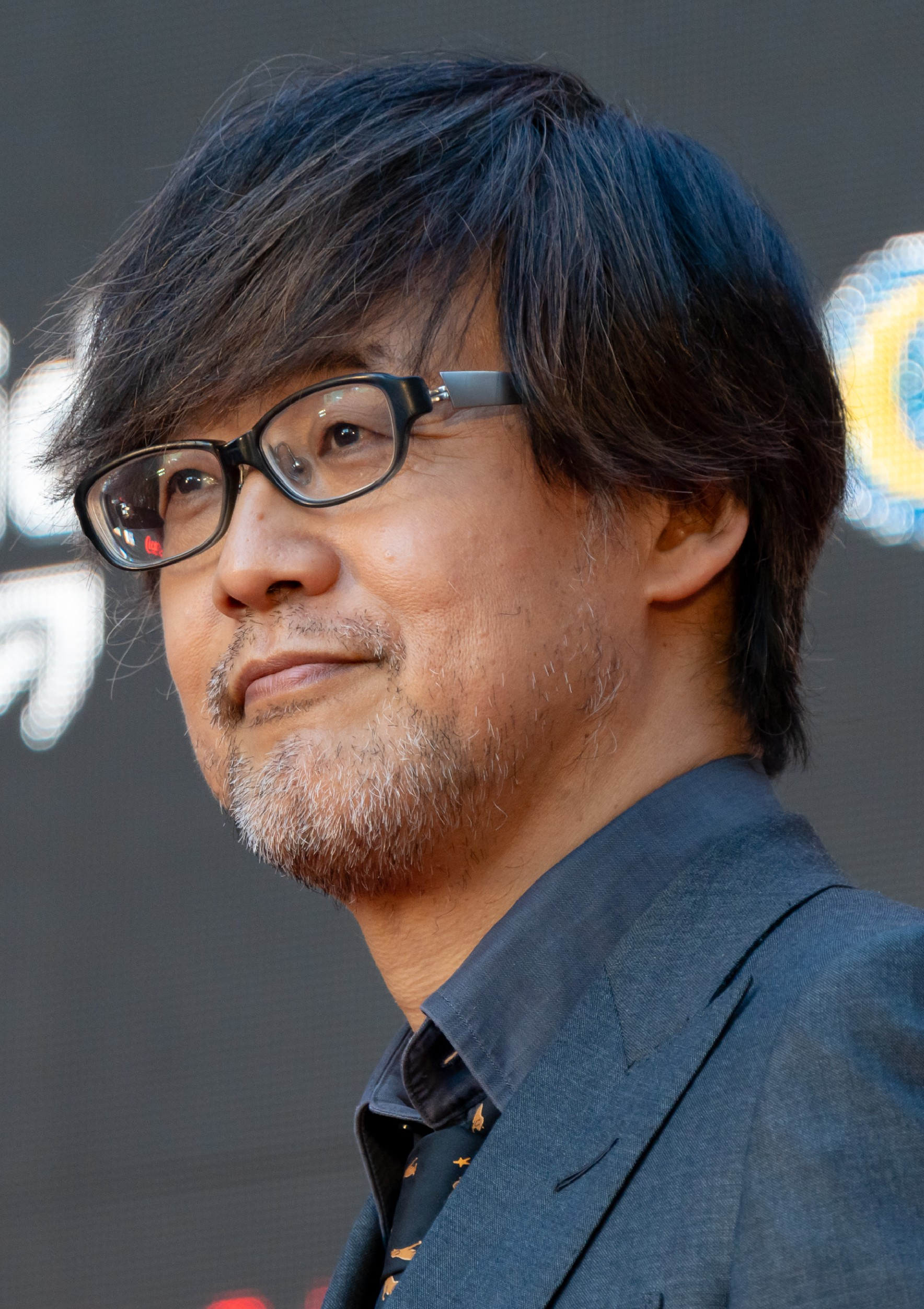
Takashi Yamazaki, one of the visual team members behind Godzilla Minus One, the first non-English language film to win Best Visual Effects

Best Visual Effects
Year	Name	Film	Status	Notes
2023	Takashi Yamazaki; Kiyoko Shibuya; Masaki Takahashi; Tatsuji Nojima	Godzilla Minus One	Won	First Japanese production to be nominated and win for Best Visual Effects.

== Honorary Award ==
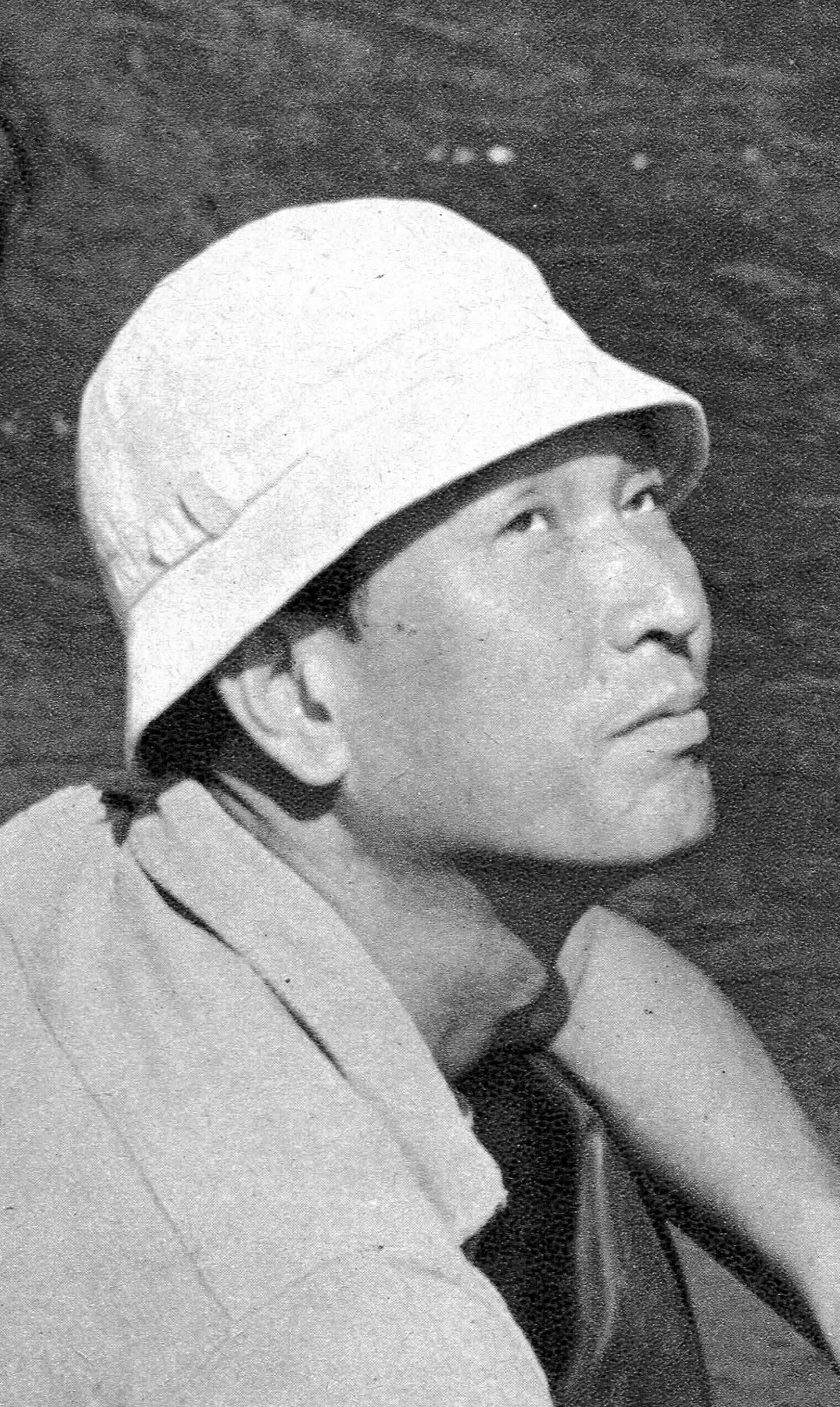
Akira Kurosawa was received an Honorary Academy Award for his work.

Honorary Award
Year	Name	Notes
1989	Akira Kurosawa	"for accomplishments that have inspired, delighted, enriched and entertained audiences and influenced filmmakers throughout the world."
2014	Hayao Miyazaki	"a master storyteller whose animated artistry has inspired filmmakers and audiences around the world."

== See also ==
- Cinema of Japan
- List of Japanese films
