= Carl Biddiscombe =

Canadian-American set decorator

- Born: Carl Francis Biddiscombe; June 22, 1924; Saint John, New Brunswick, Canada
- Died: November 4, 2000 (aged 76); Laguna Niguel, California, U.S.
- Occupation: Set decorator
- Years active: 1959–1987
- Spouse: Phylis Ruth Biddiscombe (m. 1964)

Carl Francis Biddiscombe (June 22, 1924 – November 4, 2000) was a Canadian-American set decorator. He was nominated for two Academy Awards in the category Best Art Direction for the films Gaily, Gaily and Tora! Tora! Tora!.

Biddiscombe died in Laguna Niguel, California on November 4, 2000, at the age of 76. He was buried at Pacific View Memorial Park along with his wife who died in 2018.

== Selected filmography ==
- Gaily, Gaily (1969; co-nominated with Robert F. Boyle, George B. Chan and Edward G. Boyle)
- Tora! Tora! Tora! (1970; co-nominated with Jack Martin Smith, Yoshirō Muraki, Richard Day, Taizô Kawashima, Walter M. Scott and Norman Rockett)
