= American Cinema Editors Awards 1971 =

21st ACE Eddie Awards
- Presented by: American Cinema Editors
- Date: March 13, 1971
- Site: Century Plaza Hotel, Los Angeles, California
- Hosted by: Martha Raye

Highlights
- Best Film: Patton

The 21st American Cinema Editors Awards, which were presented on Saturday, March 13, 1971, at The Century Plaza Hotel, honored the best editors in films and television. The award was hosted by actress Martha Raye. Editor and director Elmo Williams won the "ACE Golden Eddie Filmmaker of the Year Award" for "outstanding achievements in filmmaking, climaxing a career which began in film editing." Actor Lee J. Cobb handed the award to Williams.

== Nominees ==
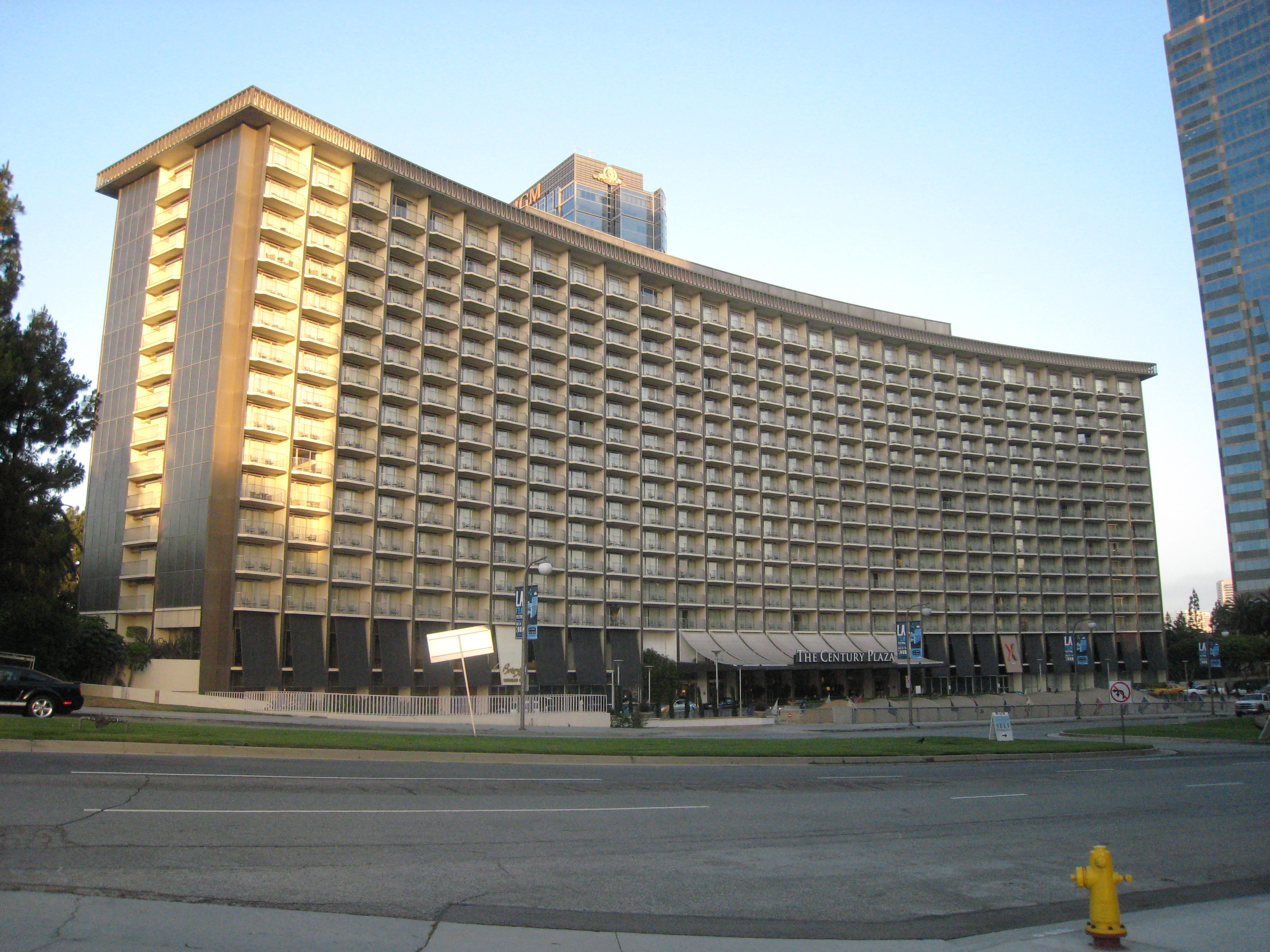
The Century Plaza Hotel, the site of the 1971 Eddies.

Best Edited Feature Film	Best Edited Television Program
Patton – Hugh S. Fowler; Airport – Stuart Gilmore; The Great White Hope – William H. Reynolds; M*A*S*H – Danford B. Greene; Tora! Tora! Tora! – Inoue Chikaya, Pembroke J. Herring, and James E. Newcom	Medical Center: "Death Grip" – Richard Cahoon; Gunsmoke: "Snow Train: Part 1" – Thomas J. McCarthy; Storefront Lawyers: "A Man's Castle" – Ira Heymann; The Tragedy of the Red Salmon – David Blewitt; The Young Lawyers: "The Glass Prison – Joseph Dervin
