= Shinya Inoue =

Shinya Inoue may refer to:

- Shinya Inoué, professor
- Inoue Chikaya, film editor
