= Tora! Tora! Tora! =

1970 film about the attack on Pearl Harbor

- Theatrical release poster
- Directed by: American sequences Richard Fleischer; Japanese sequences Toshio Masuda; Kinji Fukasaku
- Screenplay by: American sequences Larry Forrester; Japanese sequences Hideo Oguni; Ryūzō Kikushima
- Based on: Tora! Tora! Tora! (1969 book) by Gordon W. Prange; The Broken Seal (1967 book) by Ladislas Farago
- Produced by: Elmo Williams
- Starring: Martin Balsam; So Yamamura; Joseph Cotten; Tatsuya Mihashi; E.G. Marshall; James Whitmore; Takahiro Tamura; Eijirō Tōno; Jason Robards
- Cinematography: American sequences Charles F. Wheeler; Japanese sequences Shinsaku Himeda; Masamichi Satoh; Osamu Furuya
- Edited by: James E. Newcom; Pembroke J. Herring; Inoue Chikaya
- Music by: Jerry Goldsmith
- Production companies: Williams-Fleischer Productions; Toei Company
- Distributed by: 20th Century-Fox (United States); Toei Company (Japan)
- Release dates: September 23, 1970 (U.S.); September 25, 1970 (Japan)
- Running time: 144 minutes
- Countries: United States; Japan
- Languages: English; Japanese
- Budget: $25 million
- Box office: $37 million (rentals)

Tora! Tora! Tora! (Japanese: トラ・トラ・トラ！) is a 1970 Japanese-American war film that dramatizes the events leading up to the Japanese attack on Pearl Harbor in 1941, from both American and Japanese positions. The film was produced by Elmo Williams and directed by Richard Fleischer, Toshio Masuda and Kinji Fukasaku. It features an ensemble cast, including Martin Balsam, Joseph Cotten, So Yamamura, E.G. Marshall, James Whitmore, Tatsuya Mihashi, Takahiro Tamura, Wesley Addy, and Jason Robards. It was both Masuda's and Fukasaku's first English-language film and first international co-production.

The tora of the title, although literally meaning "tiger", is actually a two-syllable codeword that abbreviated the longer phrase totsugeki raigeki 突撃雷撃 ("lightning attack"), used by the invaders to indicate that complete surprise had been achieved.

The film was released in the United States by 20th Century-Fox on September 23, 1970, and in Japan by the Toei Company on September 25. It received mixed reviews from American critics, but was praised for its historical accuracy and attention to detail, its visual effects, and its action sequences.

Tora! Tora! Tora! was nominated for five Oscars at the 43rd Academy Awards, including Best Cinematography and Best Film Editing, winning Best Visual Effects (L.B. Abbott and A.D. Flowers). The National Board of Review ranked it in its Top Ten Films of 1971. A 1994 survey at the USS Arizona Memorial determined that for Americans the film was the most common source of popular knowledge about the Pearl Harbor attack.

== Plot ==
In September 1940, following a severe trade embargo imposed on belligerent Japan by the United States a year earlier, influential Japanese army figures and politicians push through an alliance with Germany and Italy, despite opposition from the Japanese navy, and prepare for war. Newly appointed Commander-in-Chief of the Combined Fleet Admiral Isoroku Yamamoto reluctantly plans a pre-emptive strike, believing Japan's best chance of controlling the Pacific Ocean is to quickly destroy the American Pacific fleet at Pearl Harbor. Air Staff Officer Minoru Genda is chosen to mastermind the operation, while his old Naval Academy classmate Mitsuo Fuchida is selected to lead the attack.

In Washington, U.S. military intelligence has broken the Japanese Purple Code, allowing it to intercept secret radio transmissions indicating increased Japanese naval activity. U.S. Army Colonel Rufus S. Bratton and U.S. Navy Lieutenant Commander Alwin Kramer monitor the transmissions. At Pearl Harbor, Admiral Husband E. Kimmel increases defensive naval and air patrols around Hawaii. General Walter Short orders aircraft concentrated on the airfield runways to prevent sabotage, while some planes are dispersed to other airfields on Oahu.

Diplomatic tensions escalate as the Japanese ambassador to Washington continues negotiations to stall for time. Bratton and Kramer learn from intercepted messages that Japan plans to send 14 messages from Tokyo to its embassy in Washington, with orders to destroy its code machines after the final message. Deducing that the messages signal an impending surprise attack, Bratton tries to warn his superiors. However, Chief of Naval Operations Harold R. Stark hesitates to alert Hawaii without first notifying President Franklin D. Roosevelt. Meanwhile, Army Chief of Staff General George Marshall orders Pearl Harbor warned, but poor atmospheric conditions prevent radio transmission, and the warning telegram is not marked urgent.

The Japanese fleet launches its aircraft at dawn on December 7, 1941. Two radar operators detect the approaching planes, but duty officer Lieutenant Kermit Tyler dismisses their concerns. The destroyer USS Ward likewise reports sinking a Japanese miniature submarine near the entrance to Pearl Harbor, but the report is dismissed. The Japanese achieve complete surprise, signaled by Commander Fuchida's code phrase, "Tora! Tora! Tora!"

The attack inflicts catastrophic damage and severe casualties. Several battleships are sunk or heavily damaged, while General Short's anti-sabotage measures leave American aircraft vulnerable on the ground. In Washington, a stunned Secretary of State Cordell Hull receives the Japanese ambassador Kichisaburō Nomura. Japan's 14-part message, including a declaration that peace negotiations have ended, was intended to reach the Americans thirty minutes before the attack, but the Japanese embassy fails to decode and transcribe it in time. The attack therefore begins while the two nations are technically still at peace. Distraught and unaware of the ongoing assault, Nomura is unable to explain the delay, and Hull rebuffs him.

Vice-Admiral Chūichi Nagumo, commander of the Japanese fleet, refuses to launch a scheduled third wave of aircraft, fearing that doing so would expose his fleet to U.S. submarines. Hours after the attack ends, General Short and Admiral Kimmel finally receive Marshall's warning. Aboard his flagship, Yamamoto learns that the primary targets—the American aircraft carriers—were absent from Pearl Harbor, having departed days earlier. Lamenting that the declaration of war arrived only after the attack began, Yamamoto concludes that the assault will provoke a powerful American response: "I fear all we have done is to awaken a sleeping giant and fill him with a terrible resolve."

== Cast ==
=== Americans ===
Actor	Role	Notes
Joseph Cotten	Secretary Henry Stimson	Secretary of War
George Macready	Secretary Cordell Hull	Secretary of State
Leon Ames	Secretary Frank Knox	Secretary of the Navy
Meredith Weatherby	Ambassador Joseph Grew	US Ambassador to Japan
Harold Conway	Eugene Dooman	US Embassy counselor, Tokyo
Martin Balsam	Admiral Husband E. Kimmel	Commander-in-Chief, U.S. Pacific Fleet
Edward Andrews	Admiral Harold Rainsford Stark	Chief of Naval Operations
Bill Zuckert	Admiral James O. Richardson	Commander, United States Fleet
Keith Andes	General George C. Marshall	Chief of Staff of the U.S. Army
James Whitmore	Vice Admiral William F. Halsey	Commander, Aircraft Battle Force, U.S. Pacific Fleet
Walter Reed	Vice Admiral William S. Pye	Interim Commander, Aircraft Battle Force, U.S. Pacific Fleet
Edmon Ryan	Rear Admiral Patrick Bellinger	Commander, Patrol Wing Two
Ken Lynch	Rear Admiral John H. Newton	Commander, USS Lexington
Jason Robards	Major General Walter Short	Commander-in-Chief, U.S. Army Forces Hawaii
Larry Thor	Major General Frederick L. Martin	Commander, Hawaiian Air Force
Harlan Warde	Brigadier General Leonard T. Gerow	Commander, 29th Infantry Division
Edward Sheehan	Brigadier General Howard C. Davidson	Commander, 14th Pursuit Wing
Richard Erdman	Colonel Edward F. French	Chief, War Department Signal Center
Bill Edwards	Colonel Kendall J. Fielder	Assistant Chief of Staff, Intelligence, Hawaiian Department
Richard Anderson	Captain John Earle	Chief of Staff, 14th Naval District
Walter Brooke	Captain Theodore Wilkinson	Director of Naval Intelligence
Karl Lukas	Captain Harold C. Train	Chief of Staff, Battle Force, U.S. Pacific Fleet
Francis De Sales	Captain Arthur H. McCollum	Naval Intelligence officer
G.D. Spradlin	Commander Maurice E. Curts	Communications Officer, U.S. Pacific Fleet
Robert Shayne	Commander William H. Buracker	Operations Officer, Aircraft Battle Force, U.S. Pacific Fleet
E.G. Marshall	Lieutenant Colonel Rufus S. Bratton	Chief, Far Eastern Section, Military Intelligence Division, War Department
Dick Fair	Lieutenant Colonel Carrol A. Powell	Radar officer
Wesley Addy	Lieutenant Commander Alwin Kramer	Cryptographer, OP-20-G
Frank Aletter	Lieutenant Commander Francis Thomas	Command Duty Officer, USS Nevada
Jerry Fogel	Lieutenant Commander William W. Outerbridge	Commanding Officer, USS Ward
Dick Cook	Lieutenant Commander Logan C. Ramsey	Operations Officer, Patrol Wing Two
Norman Alden	Major Truman Landon	Commanding Officer, 38th Reconnaissance Squadron
Dave Donnelly	Major Gordon Blake	Hickam Field Operations Officer
Robert Karnes	Major John H. Dillon	Knox's aide
Neville Brand	Lieutenant Harold Kaminski	Duty Officer, 14th Naval District
Ron Masak	Lieutenant Lawrence E. Ruff	Communications Officer, USS Nevada
Jerry Cox	1st Lieutenant Kermit Tyler	Pilot, 78th Pursuit Squadron
Rick Cooper	2nd Lieutenant George Welch	Pilot, 47th Pursuit Squadron
Carl Reindel	2nd Lt. Kenneth Taylor	Pilot, 47th Pursuit Squadron
David Westberg	Ensign Edgar M. Fair	Officer, USS California
Elven Havard	Messman 3rd Class Doris Miller	Crew member, USS West Virginia
Bruce Wilson	Private Joseph Lockard	Radarman at Opana Point

=== Japanese ===
Actor	Role	Notes
Koreya Senda	Fumimaro Konoe	Prime Minister of Japan
Hiroshi Akutagawa	Marquis Koichi Kido	Lord Keeper of the Privy Seal
Kazuo Kitamura	Shigenori Tōgō	Foreign Minister
Sō Yamamura	Admiral Isoroku Yamamoto	Commander-in-Chief, Combined Fleet
Bontaro Miyake	Admiral Koshirō Oikawa	Minister of the Navy
Asao Uchida	General Hideki Tojo	Minister of War
Eijirō Tōno	Vice Admiral Chūichi Nagumo	Commander-in-Chief, 1st Air Fleet
Junya Usami	Vice Admiral Zengo Yoshida	Minister of the Navy
Susumu Fujita	Rear Admiral Tamon Yamaguchi	Commander, Second Carrier Division
Ichiro Reuzaki	Rear Admiral Ryūnosuke Kusaka	Chief of Staff, 1st Air Fleet
Kan Nihonyanagi	Rear Admiral Chūichi Hara	Commander, 5th Carrier Division
Tōru Abe	Rear Admiral Takijirō Ōnishi	Chief of Staff, 11th Air Fleet
Shunichi Nakamura	Captain Kameto "Gandhi" Kuroshima	Senior Staff Officer, Combined Fleet
Tatsuya Mihashi	Commander Minoru Genda	Air Staff, 1st Air Fleet
Takahiro Tamura	Lieutenant Commander Mitsuo Fuchida	Commander, Air Group, Akagi
Toshio Hosokawa	Lieutenant Commander Shigeharu Murata	Commander, 1st Torpedo Attack Unit, Akagi
Hisashi Igawa	Lieutenant Mitsuo Matsuzaki	Fuchida's pilot
Hideo Murota	Lieutenant Zenji Abe	Pilot, Air Group, Akagi
Shōgo Shimada (Note: Voice dubbed by Paul Frees.)	Ambassador Kichisaburo Nomura	Japanese Ambassador to the United States
Hisao Toake	Saburō Kurusu	Diplomat

=== Civilians ===
Actor	Role	Notes
Leora Dana	Ileana Kramer	Lt. Cdr. Kramer's wife
June Dayton	Ray Cave	Secretary
Akira Kume	Katsuzo Okumura	Japanese embassy secretary
Jeff Donnell	Cornelia Fort	Civilian flying instructor
Hank Jones	Davey	Civilian student pilot
Andrew Hughes	Minister Joachim von Ribbentrop	German Minister for Foreign Affairs
Kiyoshi Atsumi	Japanese messman	

== Production ==
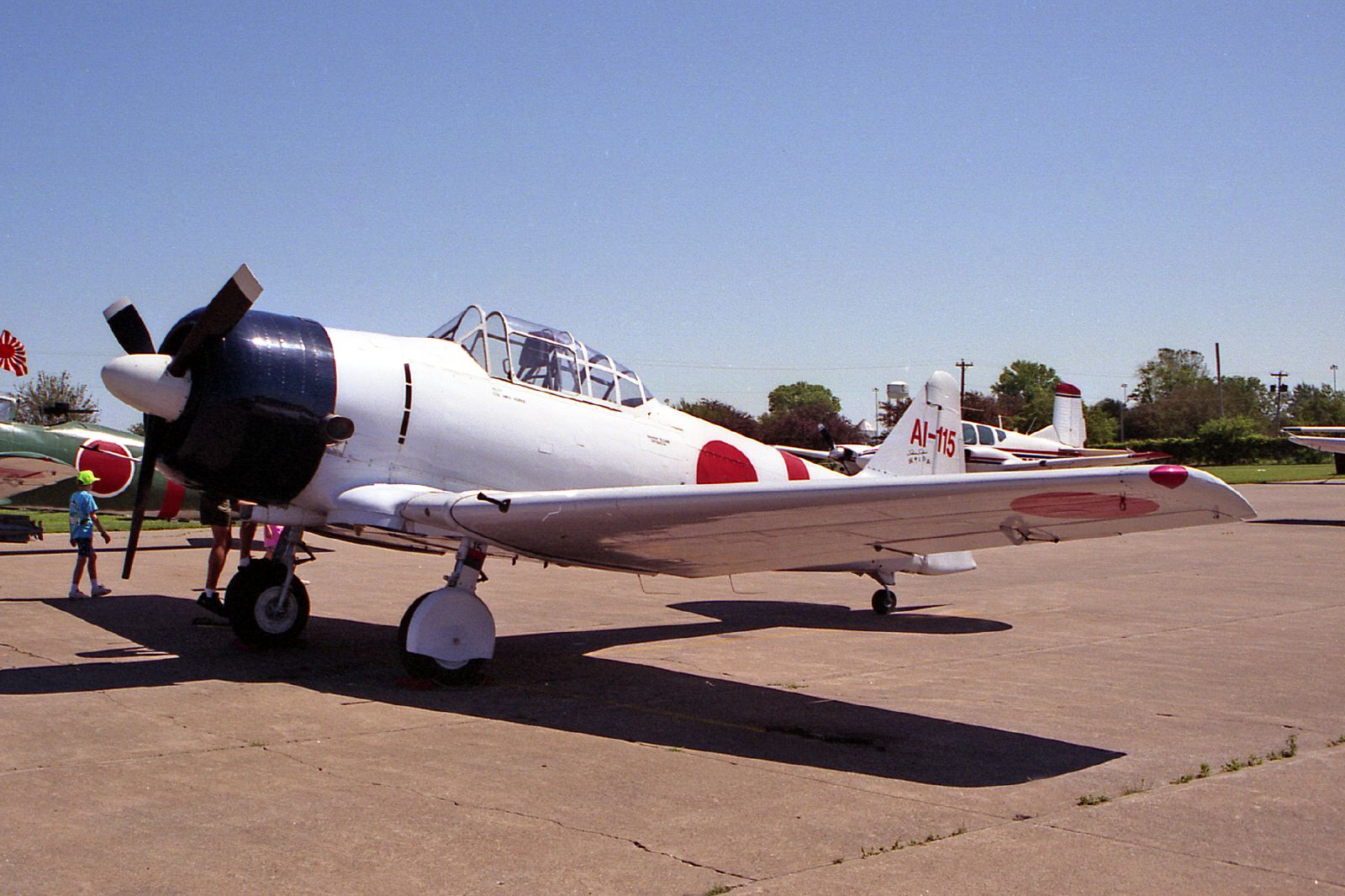
The North American T-6 Texan stood in for the Mitsubishi A6M Zero as there were no airworthy types at that time. Only Zeros from the carrier Akagi were depicted, identifiable by the single red band on the rear fuselage.

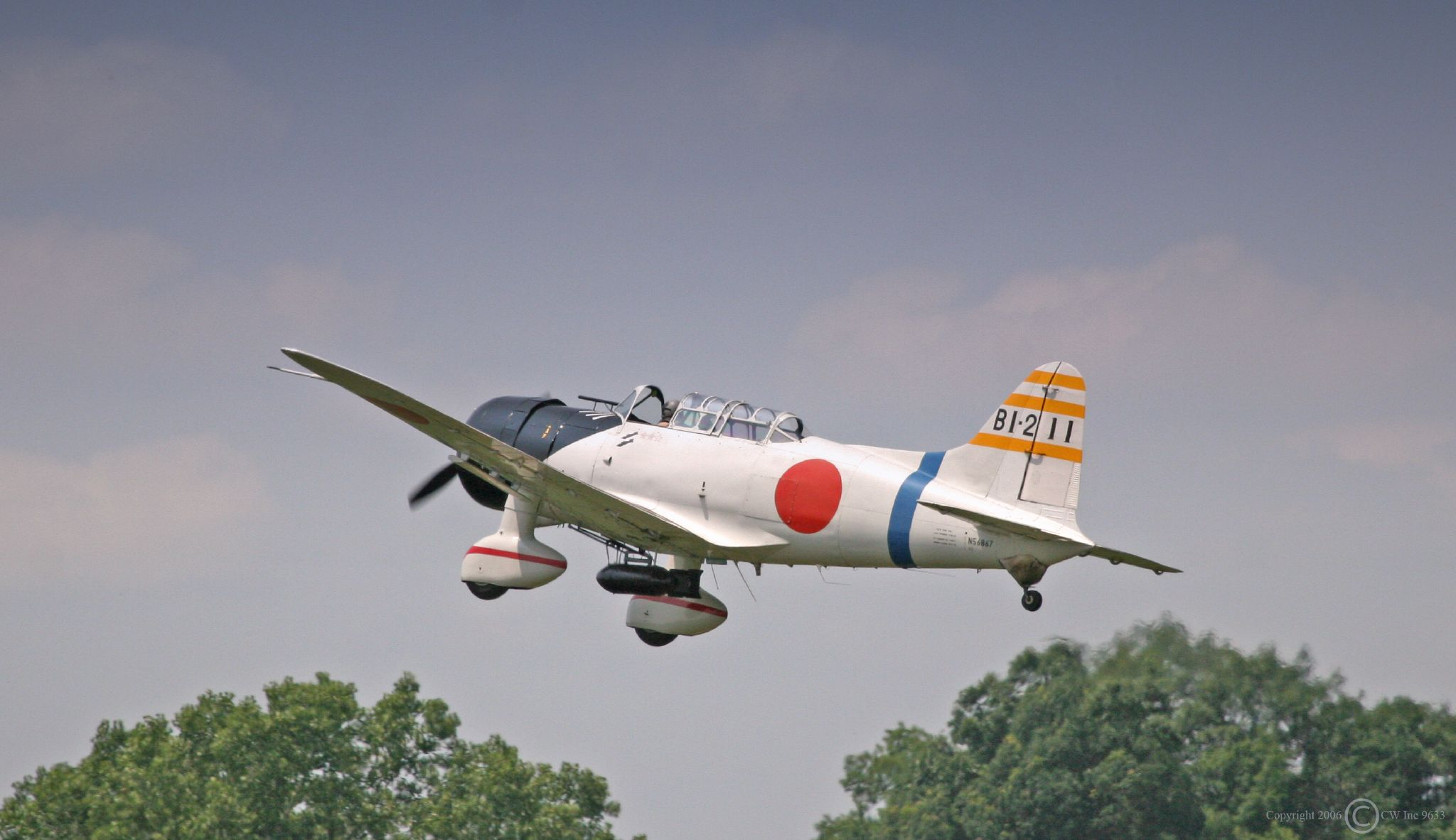
Aichi D3A replica at the Geneseo Airshow. In 1968 a Vultee BT-13 Valiant (N56867) was converted to a Val replica for use in the filming of the movie Tora! Tora! Tora!, flown as Val "AI-244" from the carrier Akagi.

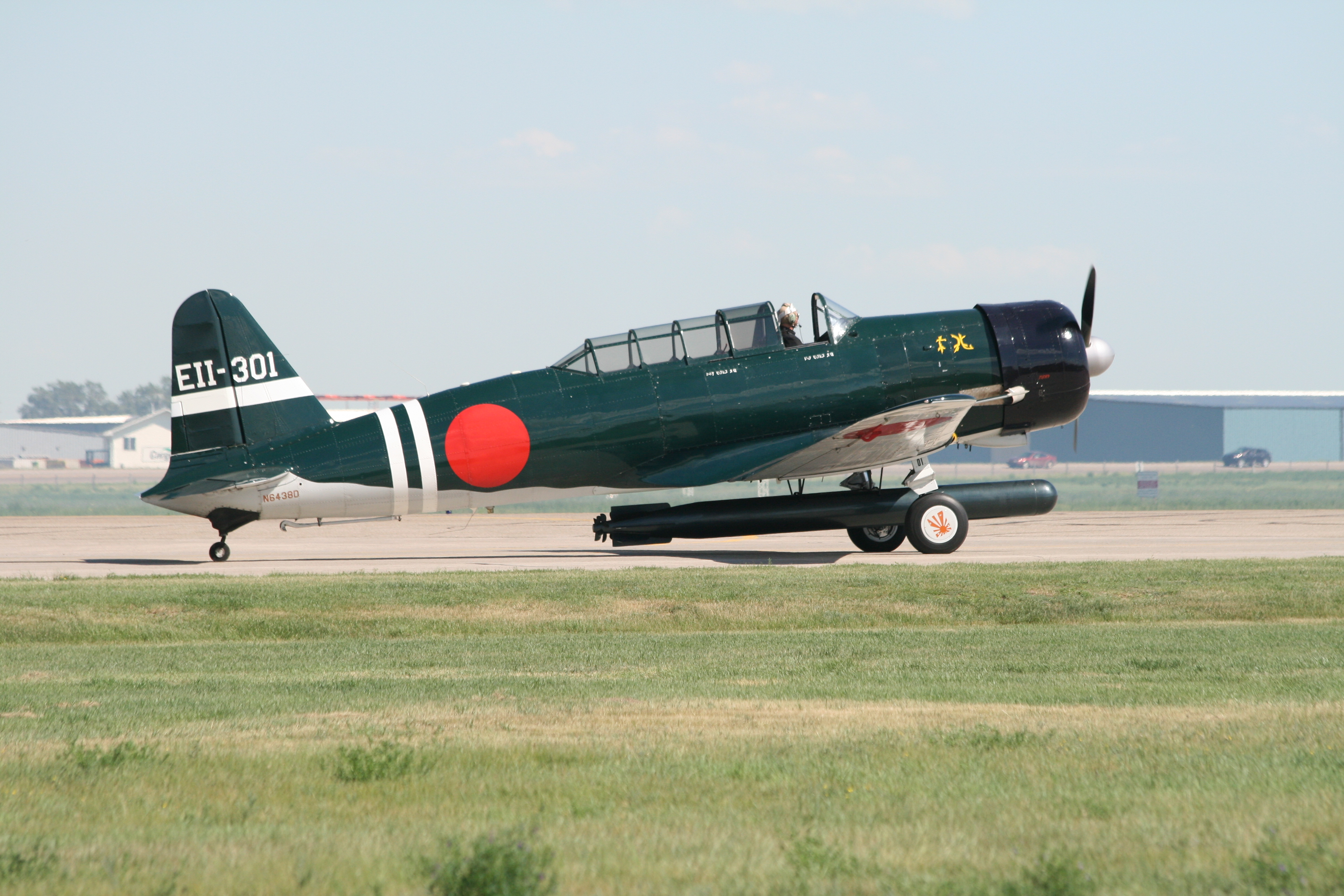
Nakajima B5N replica modified from a T-6 for the movie Tora! Tora! Tora!

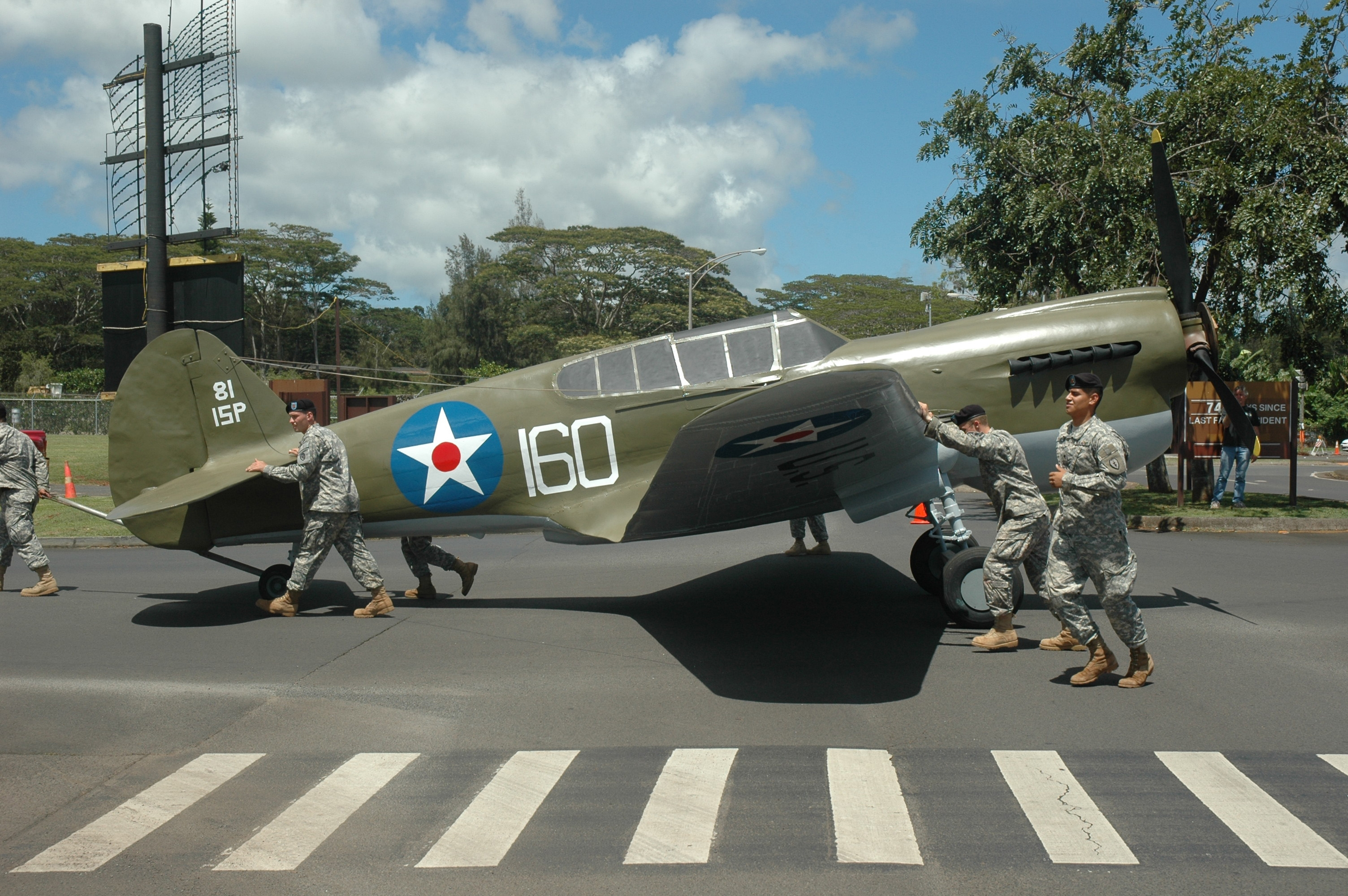
A number of Curtiss P-40 Warhawk mockups were blown up during filming. This example, which was spared destruction, is currently on display at Wheeler Army Airfield, with markings identical to those of 2nd Lt George Welch.

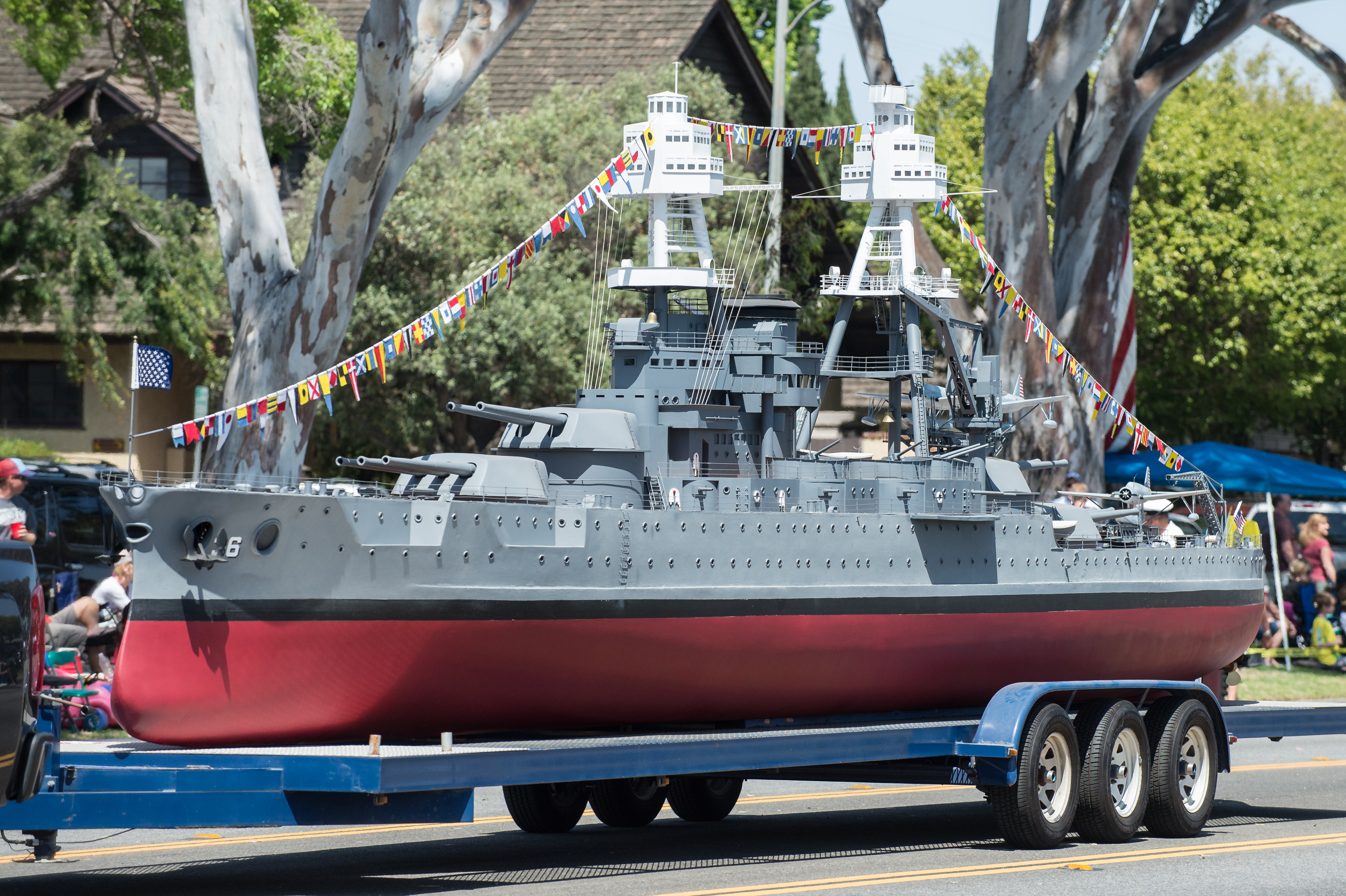
Replica models like this 1/15 scale USS Nevada were used for the overhead shots of Battleship Row. The model survives today in Los Angeles and often appears at local parades.

Veteran 20th Century-Fox executive Darryl F. Zanuck, who had earlier produced The Longest Day (1962), wanted to create an epic that depicted what "really happened on December 7, 1941", with a "revisionist's approach". He believed that the commanders in Hawaii, General Walter Short and Admiral Husband E. Kimmel, though scapegoated for decades, provided adequate defensive measures for the apparent threats, including relocation of the fighter aircraft at Pearl Harbor to the middle of the base, in response to fears of sabotage from local Japanese. Despite a breakthrough in intelligence, they had received limited warning of the increasing risk of aerial attack. Recognizing that a balanced and objective recounting was necessary, Zanuck developed an American-Japanese co-production, allowing for "a point of view from both nations". He was helped out by his son, Richard D. Zanuck, who was chief executive at Fox during this time.

Production on Tora! Tora! Tora! took three years to plan and prepare for the eight months of principal photography. The film was created in two separate productions, one based in the United States, directed by Richard Fleischer, and one based in Japan. The Japanese side was initially to be directed by Akira Kurosawa, who worked on script development and pre-production for two years. However, after two weeks of shooting, he was replaced by Toshio Masuda and Kinji Fukasaku, who directed the Japanese sections. Toshiro Mifune reportedly had been scheduled to play Isoroku Yamamoto but withdrew when Kurosawa left the project.

Richard Fleischer said of Akira Kurosawa's role in the project:

Well, I always thought that even though Kurosawa was a genius at film-making and indeed he was, I sincerely believe that he was miscast for this film, this was not his type of film to make, he never made anything like it and it just wasn't his style. I felt he was not only uncomfortable directing this kind of movie but also he wasn't used to having somebody tell him how he should make his film. He always had complete autonomy, and nobody would dare make a suggestion to Kurosawa about the budget, or shooting schedule, or anything like that. And then here he was, with Darryl Zanuck on his back and Richard Zanuck on him and Elmo Williams and the production managers, and it was all stuff that he never had run into before, because he was always untouchable. I think he was getting more and more nervous and more insecure about how he was going to work on this film. And of course, the press got a hold of a lot of this unrest on the set and they made a lot out of that in Japan, and it was more pressure on him, and he wasn't used to that kind of pressure.

Larry Forrester and frequent Kurosawa collaborators Hideo Oguni and Ryūzō Kikushima wrote the screenplay, based on the books The Broken Seal: "Operation Magic" and the Secret Road to Pearl Harbor (1967) by Ladislas Farago and Tora! Tora! Tora! (1963) by Gordon Prange of University of Maryland, who served as a technical consultant. Numerous technical advisors on both sides, some of whom had participated in the battle and/or planning, were crucial in maintaining the accuracy of the film. Minoru Genda, the man who largely planned and led the attack on Pearl Harbor, was an uncredited technical advisor for the film.

Four cinematographers were involved in the main photography: Charles F. Wheeler, Shinsaku Himeda, Masamichi Satoh, and Osamu Furuya. They were jointly nominated for the Academy Award for Best Cinematography. A number of well-known cameramen also worked on the second units without credit, including Thomas Del Ruth and Rexford Metz. The second unit doing miniature photography was directed by Ray Kellogg, while the second unit doing aerial sequences was directed by Robert Enrietto.

Noted composer Jerry Goldsmith composed the film score and Robert McCall painted several scenes for various posters of the film.

The carrier entering Pearl Harbor towards the end of the film was in fact the Essex-class aircraft carrier USS Kearsarge, returning to port. The "Japanese" aircraft carrier was the anti-submarine carrier USS Yorktown, fitted with a false bow to disguise the catapults. The Japanese A6M Zero fighters and the somewhat longer "Kate" torpedo bombers or "Val" dive bombers were heavily modified Royal Canadian Air Force Harvard (T-6 Texan) and BT-13 Valiant pilot training aircraft. The large fleet of Japanese aircraft was created by Lynn Garrison, a well-known aerial action coordinator, who produced a number of conversions. Garrison and Jack Canary coordinated the actual engineering work at facilities in the Los Angeles area. These aircraft still make appearances at air shows.

For the parallel filming in Japan, full-scale mock-ups of the Japanese battleship Nagato and aircraft carrier Akagi were built from the waterline up on shore, with about 90 feet (27 m) of their bows extending out over the ocean on stilts. These were used for much of the Japanese scenes on ship's decks. The one error introduced, however, was that the model Akagi's bridge was built on the starboard side instead of the port side. Only two Japanese carriers were built in this fashion, with bridges on the port side: Akagi and Hiryū. This was done because it was known that for the launching scenes filmed in the US, a US carrier would be used, and the islands of US carriers were always on the starboard side. A few of the modified aircraft were also converted in Japan for the flight scenes filmed there.

In preparation for filming, Yorktown was berthed at NAS North Island in San Diego to load all the aircraft, maintenance, and film crew prior to sailing to Hawaii. The night before filming the "Japanese" take-off scenes, she sailed to a spot a few miles west of San Diego, and at dawn the film crew filmed the launches of all the aircraft. Since these "Japanese" aircraft were not actual carrier-based aircraft, they did not have arresting gear with which to land back on the carrier and so continued on to land at North Island Naval Air Station. Yorktown sailed back to North Island and re-loaded the aircraft. She then sailed to Hawaii, where the aircraft were off-loaded and used to film the attack scenes in and around Pearl Harbor. Aircraft Specialties of Mesa, Arizona performed maintenance on the aircraft while in Hawaii.

The actual crash landing of a Boeing B-17 Flying Fortress during filming, a result of a jammed landing gear, was used in the final cut. The film crew received word that one of the B-17s could not lower its starboard landing gear, so they quickly set up to film the "single gear" landing. The aircraft stayed aloft to use up as much fuel as possible prior to landing, which gave the film crew some time to prepare. After viewing the "single gear" landing footage, they decided to include it in the movie. In the sequence depicting the crash, only the final crash was actual footage. For the scenes leading up to the crash, they manually retracted the starboard landing gear on a functioning B-17 and filmed the scenes of its final approach. After touching down on one wheel, the pilot simply applied power and took off again. The B-17 that actually landed with one gear up sustained only minor damage to the starboard wing and propellers and was repaired and returned to service. A total of five Boeing B-17s were obtained for filming. Other U.S. aircraft included the Consolidated PBY Catalina and, especially, the Curtiss P-40 Warhawk (two flyable examples were used). Predominantly, P-40 fighter aircraft were used to depict the U.S. defenders with a full-scale P-40 used as a template for fiberglass replicas (some with working engines and props) that were strafed and blown up during filming. Fleischer also said a scene involving a P-40 model crashing into the middle of a line of P-40s was unintended, as it was supposed to crash at the end of the line. The stuntmen involved in the scene were actually running for their lives. The B-17 crash along with several other scenes were reused in the 1976 film Midway.

With over 30 aircraft in the air, the flying scenes were complex to shoot, comparable to the 1969 film Battle of Britain where large formations of period-specific aircraft were filmed in staged aerial battles. The 2001 film Pearl Harbor would use some of the same modified aircraft.

=== Casting ===
The film was deliberately cast with actors who were not true box-office stars, including many Japanese amateurs, in order to place the emphasis on the story rather than the actors who were in it.

Several members of the cast had themselves served in World War II.

Actor	Service	Notes
Martin Balsam	Army Air Forces	B-24 radio operator
James Whitmore	Marine Corps	Lieutenant
Jason Robards	Navy	USS Northampton and USS Nashville
Wesley Addy	Army	
Norman Alden	Army	
Frank Aletter	Army	
Richard Anderson	Army	
Keith Andes	Army Air Forces	
Edward Andrews	Army	Captain, awarded Bronze Star Medal
Neville Brand	Army	Earned a Purple Heart and Silver Star
Walter Brooke	Army	
Paul Frees	Army	Wounded in combat on D-Day
G.D. Spradlin	Army Air Forces	
Arthur Tovey	Army	
Harlan Warde	Army	Special Forces
Bill Zuckert	Navy	Construction Battalion ("Seabees")

Some crew members also served in the war.

Crew member	Credited as	Service	Notes
Richard Fleischer	Director / Producer	Army	
Darryl F. Zanuck	Executive producer	Army	Colonel, Army Signal Corps. Also served in World War I.
Charles F. Wheeler	Cinematographer	Navy	Combat photographer
Gordon W. Prange	Author / Technical consultant	Navy	Chief Historian in General Douglas MacArthur's staff

Some cast members served before or after World War II.

Actor	Service	Engagements	Notes
Leon Ames	Army / Army Air Service	World War I	Field artillery and later in the flying corps
Ron Masak	Army		
Jamie Farr (uncredited voice acting)	Army	Korean War	Armed Forces Radio Service (AFRS)

== Historical accuracy ==
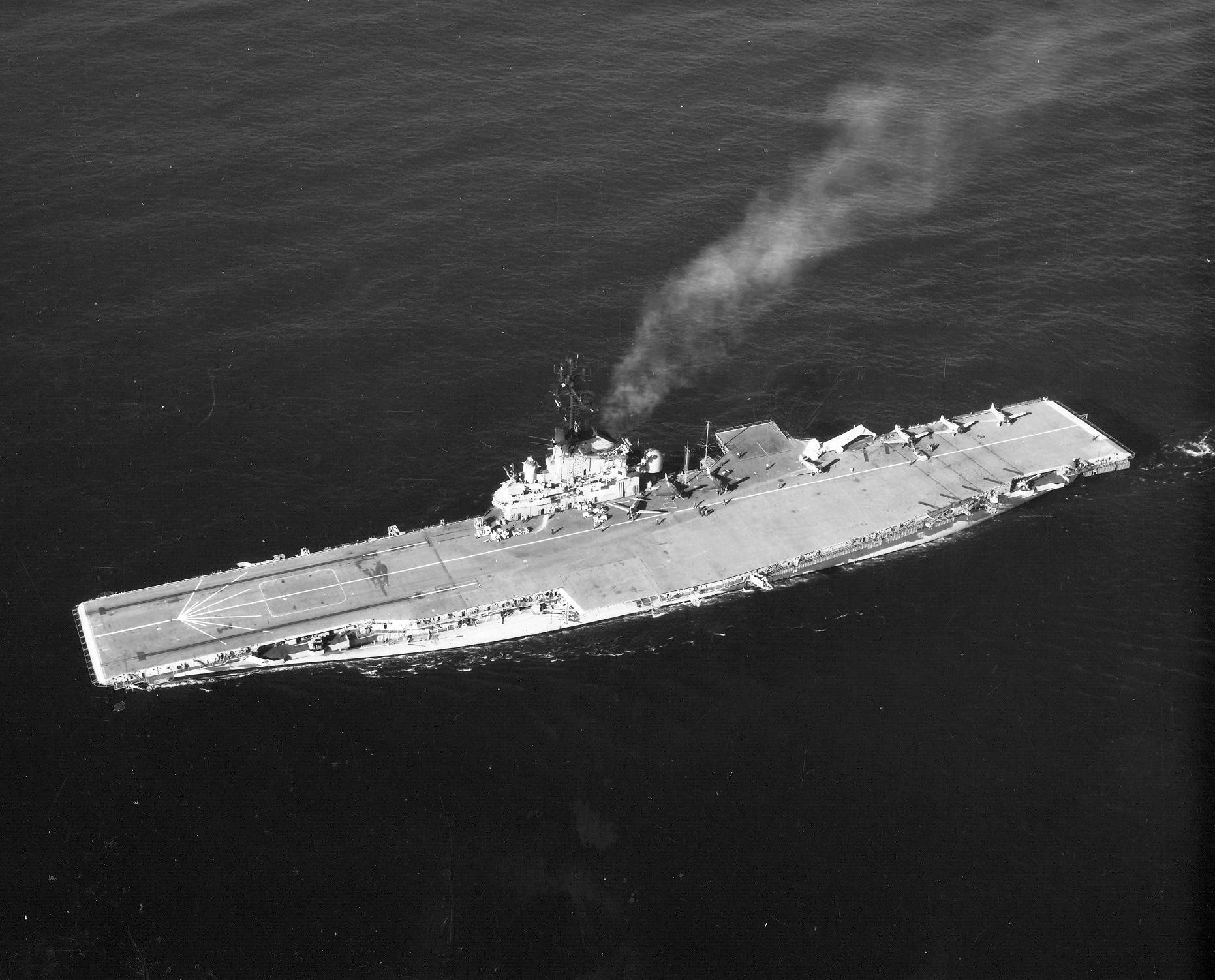
USS Yorktown during the filming of Tora! Tora! Tora!, 1968.

Tora! Tora! Tora! is regarded highly by Pearl Harbor historians and survivors for its accuracy.

Parts of the film showing the takeoff of the Japanese aircraft utilize an Essex-class aircraft carrier, Yorktown, which was commissioned in 1943 and modernized after the war to have a very slightly angled flight deck. The ship was leased by the film producers, who needed an aircraft carrier for the film, and as Yorktown was scheduled to be decommissioned in 1970, the Navy made her available. She was used largely in the takeoff sequence of the Japanese attack aircraft. The sequence shows interchanging shots of models of the Japanese aircraft carriers and Yorktown. She does not look like any of the Japanese carriers involved in the attack, due to her large bridge island and her angled landing deck. The Japanese carriers had small bridge islands, and it was not until after the war that angled flight decks were developed. In addition, during the scene in which Admiral Halsey is watching bombing practice, an aircraft carrier with the hull number 14 is shown. Admiral Halsey was on USS Enterprise, not the Essex-class carrier USS Ticonderoga, which would not be commissioned until 1944. This is understandable, however, as Enterprise and all six of the Japanese carriers from the attack had been scrapped or sunk.

Another error involves the model of the Japanese aircraft carrier Akagi. In the film, Akagi's bridge island is positioned on the starboard side of the ship, which is typical on most aircraft carriers. However, Akagi was an exception; her bridge island was on the port side of the ship. Despite this, the bridge section appeared accurately as a mirrored version of Akagi's real port-side bridge. Secondly, all of the Japanese aircraft in the footage bear the markings of Akagi's aircraft (a single vertical red stripe following the red sun symbol of Japan), even though five other aircraft carriers participated, each having its own markings. In addition, the markings do not display the aircraft's identification numbers as was the case in the actual battle. The white surround on the roundel on the Japanese aircraft was only used from 1942 onwards. Prior to this, the roundel was red only.

USS Ward (DD-139) was an old "4-piper" destroyer commissioned in 1918; the ship used in the movie, USS Finch (DE-328), which portrays Ward, looked far different from the original destroyer. In addition, in the movie, she fired two shots from her #1 gun turret. In reality, Ward fired the first shot from the #1 4-inch (102 mm) un-turreted gunmount and the second shot from the #3 wing mount. The attack on the midget submarine by USS Ward was previously mentioned in the film In Harm's Way.

A full-scale set was built representing the stern section of a U.S. Navy Standard-type battleship showing two aft gun turrets each with three gun barrels. It was used to portray both USS Arizona and USS Nevada and other battleships. It was correct for USS Arizona but incorrect for USS Nevada, which had lower triple and upper twin gun turrets. The 1/15 scale model of USS Nevada used to portray the whole ship in wide shots displayed the fore and aft turrets accurately in a 3-2-2-3 arrangement. A lattice mast (or cage mast) section representing a Tennessee-class or Colorado-class battleship was built on the ground behind the full-scale stern set to give the appearance that the set was on Battleship Row. The USS Arizona/USS Nevada stern section set was used for the explosion that destroyed USS Arizona, although the explosion took place in the forward #2 magazine and Arizona's stern section remained essentially intact.

The film has a Japanese Zero fighter being damaged by U.S. Navy CPO John William Finn at Naval Air Station at Kāneʻohe Bay and then deliberately crashing into a hangar. This is actually a composite of three incidents during the Pearl Harbor attack: in the first wave, a Japanese Zero crashed into Fort Kamehameha's ordnance building; in the second wave, a Japanese Zero deliberately crashed into a hillside after Finn shot and damaged the aircraft; also during the second wave, a damaged Japanese aircraft crashed into the seaplane tender USS Curtiss.

During a number of shots of the attack squadrons traversing across Oahu, a white cross can be seen standing on one of the mountainsides. The cross was actually erected after the attack as a memorial to the victims.

The film also featured Mitsuo Fuchida (Takahiro Tamura) and Minoru Genda (Tatsuya Mihashi) asking Admiral Chūichi Nagumo (Eijirō Tōno) for a third strike, but like many of Fuchida's post war claims this has been called into question. Genda denied making such a request and he and Admiral Ryūnosuke Kusaka both denied that Fuchida did.

In the final scene, Admiral Isoroku Yamamoto (Sō Yamamura) says: "I fear all we have done is to awaken a sleeping giant". An abridged version of this quotation is featured in the 2001 film Pearl Harbor. The 2019 film Midway also features Yamamoto (Etsushi Toyokawa) speaking aloud the "sleeping giant" quote. Although the quotation may well have encapsulated many of his real feelings about the attack, there is no printed evidence to prove Yamamoto made this statement or wrote it down. Director Richard Fleischer stated that while Yamamoto may never have said those words, the film's producer, Elmo Williams, had found the line written in Yamamoto's diary. Williams, in turn, has stated that Larry Forrester, the screenwriter, found a 1943 letter from Yamamoto to the Admiralty in Tokyo containing the quotation. However, Forrester cannot produce the letter, nor can anyone else, American or Japanese, recall it or find it.

== Release ==
The film had its world premiere on September 23, 1970, in New York, Tokyo, Honolulu and Los Angeles.

== Reception ==
=== Box office ===
At the time of its initial release, Tora! Tora! Tora! was thought to be a box office disappointment in North America. Its domestic box office of $29,548,291 made it the ninth-highest-grossing film of 1970, with distributor rentals of $14.53 million.

It was a major hit in Japan, and over the years, home media releases provided a larger overall profit. The film had earned ¥194.22 million in Japanese distributor rentals by 1971, becoming the sixth-highest-grossing film of 1971 in Japan. The film grossed a total of $3.15 million in Japan.

According to Fox records, the film required $37.15 million in rentals to break even, and had done so by December 11, 1970.

=== Critical response ===
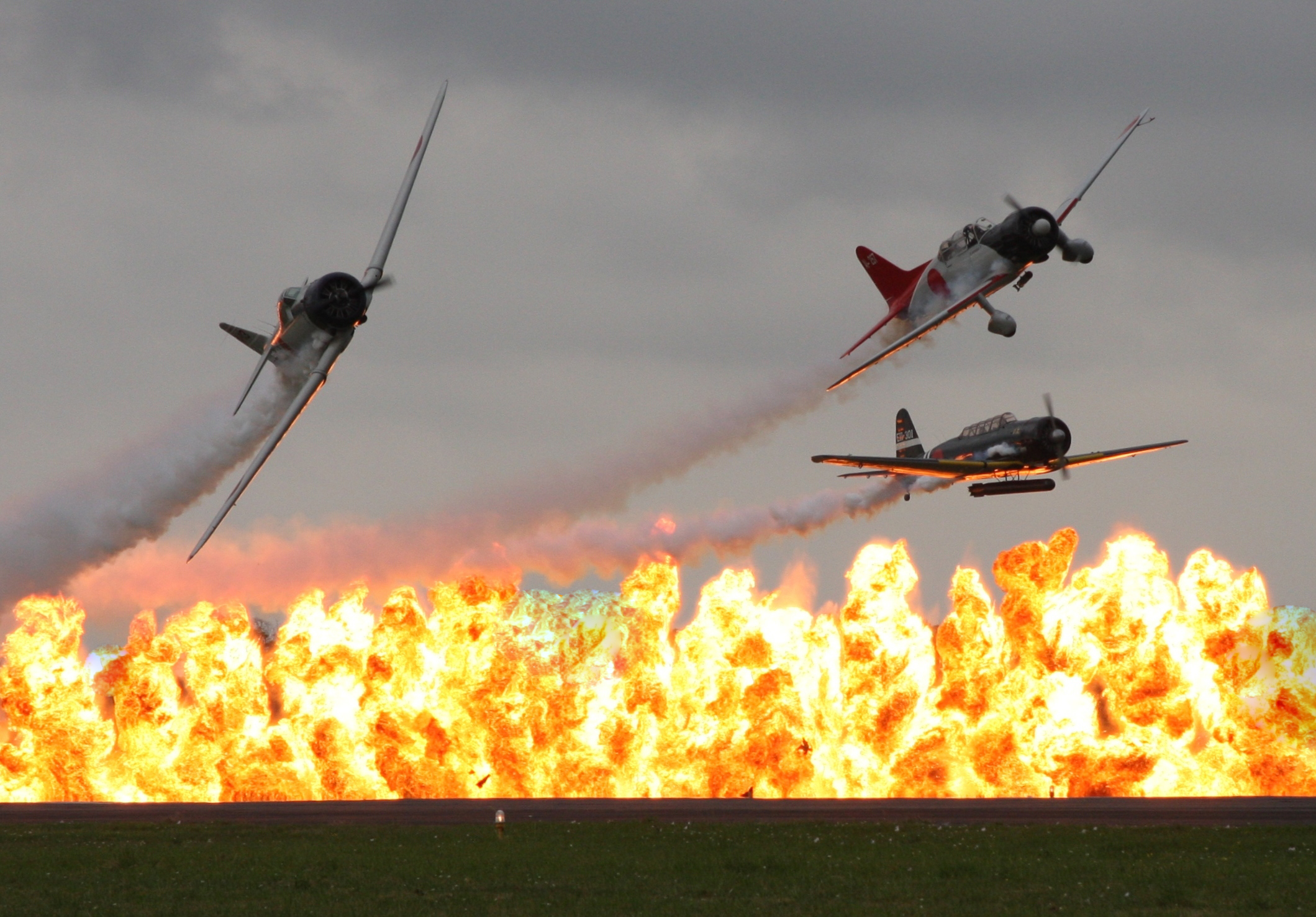
The Commemorative Air Force's Gulf Coast Wing's Tora! Tora! Tora! team still fly the movie's aircraft simulating the attack at airshows.

On Rotten Tomatoes, the film holds a 59% rating based on 27 reviews. The site's consensus states: "Tora! Tora! Tora! is scrupulously accurate and lays out of the tragedy of Pearl Harbor with intricate detail, but the film's clinical approach to the sound and fury signifies little feeling." On Metacritic it has a score of 46% based on reviews from 8 critics, indicating "mixed or average reviews".

Roger Ebert gave the film one star and felt that Tora! Tora! Tora! was "one of the deadest, dullest blockbusters ever made" and suffered from not having "some characters to identify with." In addition, he criticized the film for poor acting and special effects in his 1970 review. Vincent Canby, reviewer for The New York Times, was similarly unimpressed, noting the film was "nothing less than a $25-million irrelevancy." Variety also found the film to be boring; however, the magazine praised the film's action sequences and production values. Charles Champlin in his review for the Los Angeles Times on September 23, 1970, considered the movie's chief virtues as a "spectacular", and the careful recreation of a historical event.

Despite the initial negative reviews, the film was critically acclaimed for its vivid action scenes and found favor with aviation aficionados. However, even the team of Jack Hardwick and Ed Schnepf, who had been involved in research on aviation films, relegated Tora! Tora! Tora! to the "also-ran" status due to its slow-moving plotline.

Several later films and TV series relating to World War II in the Pacific have used footage from Tora! Tora! Tora!. These productions include the films Midway (1976; in the Tora! Tora! Tora! DVD commentary, Fleischer expressed anger that Universal used the footage), All This and World War II (film 1976), Pearl (TV mini-series 1978), From Here to Eternity (TV mini-series 1979), The Final Countdown (1980), and Australia (2008) as well as the Magnum, P. I. television series episode titled "Lest We Forget" (first airdate February 12, 1981).

In 1994, a survey at the USS Arizona Memorial in Honolulu determined that for Americans the film was the most common source of popular knowledge about the Pearl Harbor attack.

Clark Collis of Empire gave the film three out of five stars, writing that the film "is high on historical veracity but low on drama". In 2016, Cinema Retro released a special issue dedicated to Tora! Tora! Tora! which detailed the Blu-ray release of the film. Stating that the film "has only grown in stature over the decades", it praises the attack sequences, calling them "quite spectacular", and commends the portrayal of the Japanese as "anything but ethnic stereotypes, which adds immensely to the impact of their side of the story". It also praises the "innovative, pulse-pounding" soundtrack. Reviewers called the film as being "meticulous" in its approach to dissecting the situation leading up to the attack. A reviewer called Tora! Tora! Tora! a fine documentary-style film about the Japanese attack on Pearl Harbor. The usage of both American and Japanese filmmakers provides an unbiased film and unique viewing experience, and is uncommon in the genre. A 2018 article described the film as doing "a most memorable job in portraying the whole Pearl Harbor experience".

In 2025, The Hollywood Reporter listed Tora! Tora! Tora! as having the best stunts of 1970.

=== Awards and nominations ===
Ceremony	Category	Nominee(s)	Result
43rd Academy Awards	Best Cinematography	Charles F. Wheeler, Shinsaku Himeda, Osamu Furuya and Masamichi Satoh	Nominated
43rd Academy Awards	Best Film Editing	James E. Newcom, Pembroke J. Herring and Inoue Chikaya	Nominated
43rd Academy Awards	Best Art Direction	Art Direction: Jack Martin Smith, Yoshirō Muraki, Richard Day and Taizô Kawashima; Set Decoration: Walter M. Scott, Norman Rockett and Carl Biddiscombe	Nominated
43rd Academy Awards	Best Special Visual Effects	L. B. Abbott and A. D. Flowers	Won
43rd Academy Awards	Best Sound	Murray Spivack and Herman Lewis	Nominated
1971 American Cinema Editors Awards	Best Edited Feature Film – Dramatic	James E. Newcom, Pembroke J. Herring, Inoue Chikaya	Nominated
1971 Laurel Awards	Best Picture		8th place
1971 Laurel Awards	Best Cinematographer	Charles F. Wheeler, Shinsaku Himeda, Osamu Furuya, Masamichi Satoh	4th place
National Board of Review Awards 1970	Top Ten Films		10th place

== See also ==
- List of American films of 1970
- Attack on Pearl Harbor
- Pearl Harbor (film)
- List of historical drama films
- List of historical drama films of Asia

== Sources ==
- Agawa, Hiroyuki. The Reluctant Admiral: Yamamoto and the Imperial Navy. Tokyo: Kodansha International, 2000. ISBN 4-7700-2539-4.
- Dolan, Edward F. Jr. Hollywood Goes to War. London: Bison Books, 1985. ISBN 0-86124-229-7.
- Galbraith, Stuart, IV. The Emperor and the Wolf: The Lives and Films of Akira Kurosawa and Toshiro Mifune. New York: Faber & Faber, Inc., 2002. ISBN 0-571-19982-8.
- Hardwick, Jack and Ed Schnepf. "A Viewer's Guide to Aviation Movies." The Making of the Great Aviation Films. General Aviation Series, Volume 2, 1989.
- Hathaway, John. "Tora! Tora! Tora!" Flying Review, Vol. 25, No. 3, July 1969.
- O'Hara, Bob. "Tora Tora Tora: A great historical flying film." Air Classics, Volume 6, No. 1, October 1969.
- Carnes, Mark C. "Tora! Tora! Tora!" Past Imperfect: History According to the Movies. New York: Holt, 1996. ISBN 978-0-8050-3760-9.
- Orriss, Bruce. When Hollywood Ruled the Skies: The Aviation Film Classics of World War II. Hawthorn, California: Aero Associates Inc., 2014, first edition 1984. ISBN 978-0-692-02985-5.
- Parish, James Robert. The Great Combat Pictures: Twentieth-Century Warfare on the Screen. Metuchen, New Jersey: The Scarecrow Press, 1990. ISBN 978-0-8108-2315-0.
- Prange, Gordon. "Tora! Tora! Tora!" Reader's Digest, November 1963 and December 1963.
- Robertson, Bruce. Aircraft Camouflage and Markings, 1907–1954. London: Harleyford Publications, 1961. ISBN 978-0-8168-6355-6.
- Shinsato, Douglas and Tadanori Urabe. For That One Day: The Memoirs of Mitsuo Fuchida, Commander of the Attack on Pearl Harbor. Kamuela, Hawaii: eXperience, inc., 2011. ISBN 978-0-9846745-0-3.
- Thorsten, Marie and Geoffrey White. "Binational Pearl Harbor?: Tora! Tora! Tora! and the Fate of (Trans)national Memory." The Asia-Pacific Journal: Japan Focus, December 27, 2010.
