= George B. Chan =

American art director

- Born: November 5, 1921
- Died: March 27, 1998 (aged 76)
- Occupation: Art director
- Years active: 1964–1989

George B. Chan (November 5, 1921 – March 27, 1998) was an American art director. He was nominated for an Academy Award in the category Best Art Direction for the film Gaily, Gaily.

== Selected filmography ==
- Gaily, Gaily (1969; co-nominated with Robert F. Boyle, Edward G. Boyle and Carl Biddiscombe)
