= Pembroke J. Herring =

American film editor (1930–2020)

- Born: Pembroke Jones Herring; April 15, 1930
- Died: May 19, 2020 (aged 90)
- Other names: Pembroke Herring; Pem Herring
- Occupation: Film editor
- Years active: 1966–1996
- Spouse: Barbara
- Children: Laurie Holland, Craig Herring, Robert Herring

Pembroke Jones Herring (April 15, 1930 – May 19, 2020) was an American film editor who has three Oscar nominations for the category of Best Film Editing. He often worked with Sidney Poitier on the films that Poitier directed, editing nearly all of them. Herring's son, Craig Herring, is also a film editor.

== Oscar nominations ==
- 1970 Academy Awards-Nominated for Tora! Tora! Tora!, along with Inoue Chikaya and James E. Newcom. Lost to Patton.
- 1976 Academy Awards-Nominated for Bound for Glory, along with Robert C. Jones. Lost to Rocky.
- 1985 Academy Awards-Nominated for Out of Africa, along with Sheldon Kahn, Fredric Steinkamp and William Steinkamp. Lost to Witness.

== Filmography ==
Editor
Year	Film	Director	Notes
1970	Tora! Tora! Tora!	Richard Fleischer; Toshio Masuda; Kinji Fukasaku; Akira Kurosawa	
1972	Buck and the Preacher	Sidney Poitier	First collaboration with Sidney Poitier
1973	A Warm December	Sidney Poitier	Second collaboration with Sidney Poitier
1974	Uptown Saturday Night	Sidney Poitier	Third collaboration with Sidney Poitier
1975	Let's Do It Again	Sidney Poitier	Fourth collaboration with Sidney Poitier
1976	Bound for Glory	Hal Ashby	
1977	A Piece of the Action	Sidney Poitier	Fifth collaboration with Sidney Poitier
1978	Foul Play	Colin Higgins	First collaboration with Colin Higgins
1979	The Runner Stumbles	Stanley Kramer	
1980	Little Darlings	Ronald F. Maxwell	
1980	9 to 5	Colin Higgins	Second collaboration with Colin Higgins
1982	The Best Little Whorehouse in Texas	Colin Higgins	Third collaboration with Colin Higgins
1983	Vacation	Harold Ramis	First collaboration with Harold Ramis
1984	Johnny Dangerously	Amy Heckerling	First collaboration with Amy Heckerling
1985	European Vacation	Amy Heckerling	Second collaboration with Amy Heckerling
1985	Out of Africa	Sydney Pollack	
1986	Legal Eagles	Ivan Reitman	
1987	Who's That Girl	James Foley	
1988	Last Rites	Donald P. Bellisario	
1989	Great Balls of Fire!	Jim McBride	
1990	Ghost Dad	Sidney Poitier	Sixth collaboration with Sidney Poitier
1993	Groundhog Day	Harold Ramis	Second collaboration with Harold Ramis
1993	Sister Act 2: Back in the Habit	Bill Duke	
1994	Clifford	Paul Flaherty	
1994	The Scout	Michael Ritchie	
1995	Stuart Saves His Family	Harold Ramis	Third collaboration with Harold Ramis
1996	Multiplicity	Harold Ramis	Fourth collaboration with Harold Ramis

Editorial department
Year	Film	Director	Role
1981	Zorro, The Gay Blade	Peter Medak	Supervising editor
1993	Blood In Blood Out	Taylor Hackford	Additional film editor

Producer
Year	Film	Director	Credit
1974	Uptown Saturday Night	Sidney Poitier	Associate producer
1975	Let's Do It Again	Sidney Poitier	Associate producer
1977	A Piece of the Action	Sidney Poitier	Associate producer

TV movies

Editor
Year	Film	Director
1971	Maybe I'll Come Home in the Spring	Joseph Sargent
1972	Fireball Forward	Marvin J. Chomsky
1974	Panic on the 5:22	Harvey Hart
1977	SST: Death Flight	David Lowell Rich

TV series

Editor
Year	Title	Notes
1966−68	Daniel Boone	9 episodes
1973−75	Barnaby Jones	12 episodes

TV specials

Thanks
Year	Title	Role
2021	93rd Academy Awards	In memoriam
