= Osamu Furuya =

Japanese cinematographer

- Occupation: Cinematographer

Osamu Furuya is a Japanese cinematographer. He was nominated for an Academy Award in the category Best Cinematography for the film Tora! Tora! Tora!.

== Selected filmography ==
- Brave Records of the Sanada Clan (1963)
- The Valiant Red Peony (1968)
- Tora! Tora! Tora! (1970; co-nominated with Shinsaku Himeda, Masamichi Satoh and Charles F. Wheeler)
