= Masamichi Satoh =

Japanese cinematographer

- Occupation: Cinematographer

Masamichi Satoh is a Japanese cinematographer. He was nominated for an Academy Award in the category Best Cinematography for the film Tora! Tora! Tora!.

== Selected filmography ==
- Tora! Tora! Tora! (1970; co-nominated with Osamu Furuya, Shinsaku Himeda and Charles F. Wheeler)
