= Charles F. Wheeler =

American cinematographer

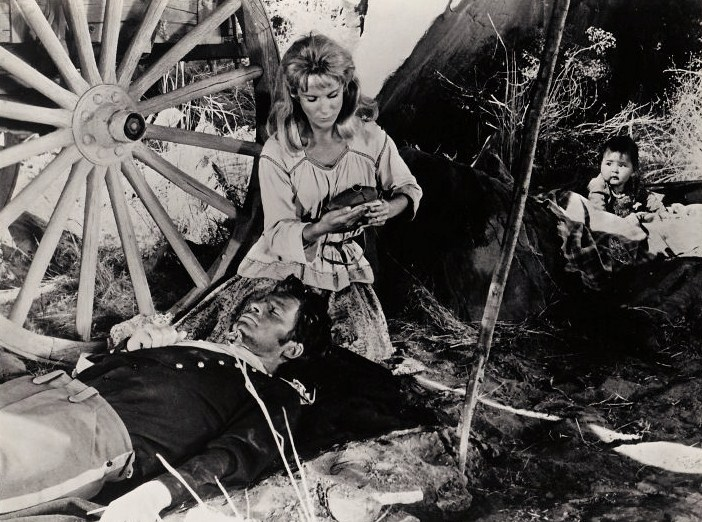
- Born: December 15, 1915; Memphis, Tennessee, U.S.
- Died: October 28, 2004 (aged 88); Orange, California, U.S.
- Occupation: Cinematographer

Charles F. Wheeler (December 15, 1915 – October 28, 2004) was an American cinematographer.

== Biography ==
Wheeler did much of his work for Walt Disney. He served as a combat photographer in the United States Navy during World War II. He died in 2004 after developing Alzheimer's disease. In 1970 he was nominated for the Academy Award for Best Cinematography; along with Osamu Furuya, Shinsaku Himeda, and Masamichi Satoh; for Tora! Tora! Tora!. He had also been nominated for a Primetime Emmy Award for Babe, a biopic about Babe Zaharias.

== Partial filmography ==
Director of photography

=== Film ===
Year	Film	Director	Notes
1966	Duel at Diablo	Ralph Nelson	
1966	The Bubble	Arch Oboler	
1968	Yours, Mine and Ours	Melville Shavelson	First collaboration with Melville Shavelson
1969	Che!	Richard Fleischer	First collaboration with Richard Fleischer
1970	Pieces of Dreams	Daniel Haller	
1970	C.C. and Company	Seymour Robbie	
1971	Cold Turkey	Norman Lear	
1971	The Barefoot Executive	Robert Butler	
1972	Silent Running	Douglas Trumbull	
1972	The War Between Men and Women	Melville Shavelson	Second collaboration with Melville Shavelson
1972	Limbo	Mark Robson	
1972	Molly and Lawless John	Gary Nelson	First collaboration with Gary Nelson
1973	Charley and the Angel	Vincent McEveety	First collaboration with Vincent McEveety
1973	One Little Indian	Bernard McEveety	
1973	Slaughter's Big Rip-Off	Gordon Douglas	
1973	The Mystery in Dracula's Castle	Robert Totten	
1974	Truck Turner	Jonathan Kaplan	
1976	Freaky Friday	Gary Nelson	Second collaboration with Gary Nelson
1978	The Cat from Outer Space	Norman Tokar	
1979	C.H.O.M.P.S.	Don Chaffey	
1980	The Last Flight of Noah's Ark	Charles Jarrott	First collaboration with Charles Jarrott
1981	Condorman	Charles Jarrott	Second collaboration with Charles Jarrott
1981	The Pursuit of D. B. Cooper	Roger Spottiswoode	First collaboration with Roger Spottiswoode
1986	The Best of Times	Roger Spottiswoode	Second collaboration with Roger Spottiswoode

Camera and electrical department

Year	Film	Director	Role	Notes	Other notes
1959	Catch Me If You Can	Don Weis	Camera operator		
1960	Inherit the Wind	Stanley Kramer	Camera operator	First collaboration with Stanley Kramer	
1961	Three Blondes in His Life	Leon Chooluck	Camera operator		
1961	Judgment at Nuremberg	Stanley Kramer	Camera operator	Second collaboration with Stanley Kramer	
1963	A Child Is Waiting	John Cassavetes	Camera operator		
1963	It's a Mad, Mad, Mad, Mad World	Stanley Kramer	Camera operator	Third collaboration with Stanley Kramer	
1965	The Hallelujah Trail	John Sturges	Photographer: Second unit		Uncredited
1966	Hawaii	George Roy Hill	Camera operator: Prologue sequence		
1970	Tora! Tora! Tora!	Richard Fleischer	Director of photography: American episodes	Second collaboration with Richard Fleischer	
1977	Herbie Goes to Monte Carlo	Vincent McEveety	Additional photography	Second collaboration with Vincent McEveety	
1979	Star Trek: The Motion Picture	Robert Wise	Additional photography		
1980	The Watcher in the Woods	John Hough	Additional photography		
1985	Brewster's Millions	Walter Hill	Additional photographer		

=== Shorts ===
Year	Film	Director
1972	Serta Perfect Sleeper	Lateef Ahmad

=== TV movies ===
Year	Film	Director
1972	She Waits	Delbert Mann
1973	The Mystery in Dracula's Castle	Robert Totten
1973	Incident on a Dark Street	Buzz Kulik
1973	Pioneer Woman	Buzz Kulik
1974	The Whiz Kid and the Mystery at Riverton	Tom Leetch
1974	Alvin the Magnificent	Tom Leetch
1974	A Tree Grows in Brooklyn	Joseph Hardy
1974	The Day the Earth Moved	Robert Michael Lewis
1974	Bad Ronald	Buzz Kulik
1974	The Red Badge of Courage	Lee Philips
1975	Lucy Gets Lucky	Jack Donohue
1975	Cage Without a Key	Buzz Kulik
1975	Babe	Buzz Kulik
1975	Three for Two	Charles Walters
1976	The Lindbergh Kidnapping Case	Buzz Kulik
1976	State Fair	David Lowell Rich
1976	Crunch	E. W. Swackhamer
1978	Lassie: A New Beginning	Don Chaffey
1978	The Gift of Love	Don Chaffey
1979	Like Normal People	Harvey Hart
1979	Valentine	Lee Philips
1982	The Renegades	Roger Spottiswoode
1983	Thursday's Child	David Lowell Rich
1983	The Fighter	David Lowell Rich
1983	I Want to Live!	David Lowell Rich
1984	His Mistress	David Lowell Rich
1985	The Hearst and Davies Affair	David Lowell Rich

=== TV pilots ===
Year	Film	Director
1968	Missy's Men	William D. Russell
1981	Revenge of the Gray Gang	Gary Nelson
1984	London and Davis in New York	Robert Day
1990	Close Encounters	David Trainer

=== TV series ===
Year	Title	Notes
1964	The Twilight Zone	2 episodes
1967−71	Gunsmoke	2 episodes
1971	Storefront Lawyers	2 episodes
1974	Hawkins	1 episode
1975	Matt Helm	1 episode
1977	James at 16	1 episode
1973−78	The Wonderful World of Disney	5 episodes
1978	The Paper Chase	1 episode
1978−79	Sesame Street	24 episodes
1983	The New Odd Couple	3 episodes
1986	Life with Lucy	13 episodes
1988	Blue Skies	1 episode

Camera and electrical department

Year	Title	Role	Notes	Other notes
1956	Science Fiction Theatre	Second cameraman	2 episodes	Uncredited

=== TV specials ===
Year	Film	Director	Notes
1978	Christmas Eve on Sesame Street	Jon Stone	Uncredited
