= James E. Newcom =

American film editor (1905–1990)

- Born: James Edward Newcom; August 29, 1905; Wayne, Indiana, U.S.
- Died: October 6, 1990 (aged 85); San Diego, California, U.S.
- Occupation: Film editor
- Years active: 1933–1970

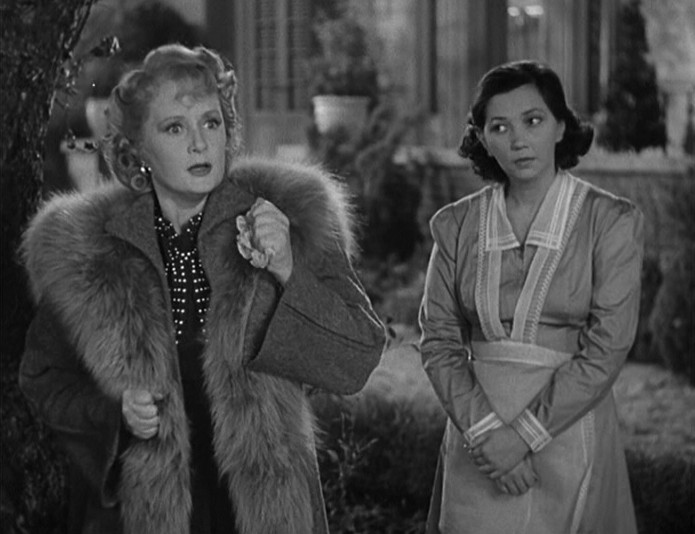
Billie Burke and Patsy Kelly in Topper Returns.jpg

James E. Newcom (August 29, 1905 – October 6, 1990) was an American film editor who had over 40 films during his long career.

== Academy Awards ==
Newcom received one Academy Award and three further nominations in the category of Best Film Editing:

- 12th Academy Awards – Won for Gone with the Wind, shared with Hal C. Kern.
- 17th Academy Awards – Nominated for Since You Went Away with Hal C. Kern. Lost to Wilson.
- 23rd Academy Awards – Nominated for Annie Get Your Gun, lost to King Solomon's Mines.
- 43rd Academy Awards – Nominated for Tora! Tora! Tora! with Inoue Chikaya and Pembroke J. Herring. Lost to Patton.

== Selected filmography ==
- Tora! Tora! Tora! (1970)
- The Impossible Years (1968)
- Scent of Mystery (1960)
- A Farewell to Arms (1957)
- Prisoner of War (1954)
- Rogue Cop (1954)
- Scaramouche (1952)
- Cause for Alarm! (1951)
- Go for Broke! (1951)
- The Law and the Lady (1951)
- Westward the Women (1951)
- Annie Get Your Gun (1950)
- Key to the City (1950)
- Right Cross (1950)
- The Red Danube (1949)
- Texas, Brooklyn & Heaven (1948)
- Walk a Crooked Mile (1948)
- Lured (1947)
- Paris Underground (1945)
- Guest in the House (1944)
- Since You Went Away (1944)
- Up in Arms (1944)
- Cairo (1942)
- Tortilla Flat (1942)
- The Vanishing Virginian (1942)
- The Chocolate Soldier (1941)
- Topper Returns (1941)
- Captain Caution (1940)
- Rebecca (1940)
- Gone with the Wind (1939)
- The Prisoner of Zenda (1937)
- A Star Is Born (1937)
- The Murder Man (1935)
