= Sanzo Wada =

Japanese painter and costume designer (1883–1967)

- 和田 三造
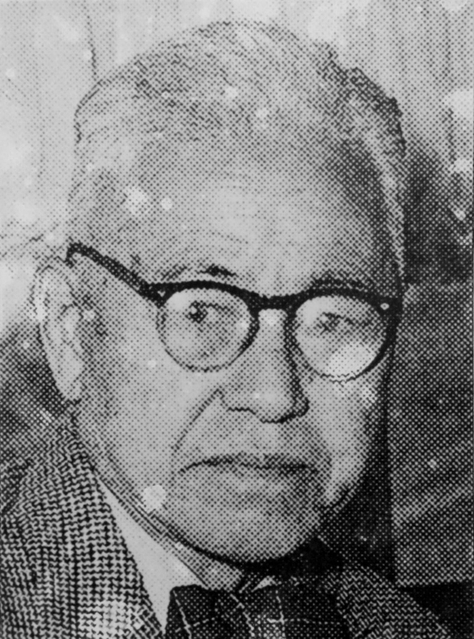
- Born: March 3, 1883; Ikuno, Hyōgo, Japan
- Died: August 22, 1967 (aged 84); Tokyo, Japan
- Education: Tokyo University of the Arts
- Known for: A Dictionary of Color Combinations
- Awards: Academy Award for Best Costume Design (1954); Person of Cultural Merit (1958)

Sanzo Wada (和田 三造, Wada Sanzō; 3 March 1883 – 22 August 1967) was a Japanese painter and costume designer who won the Academy Award for Best Costume Design for his work on the jidaigeki film Gate of Hell (1953). Wada reorganized the Japan Standard Color Association into the Japan Color Research Laboratory in 1945, and served as its president.

He was a member of the Japan Art Academy.

His painting South Wind and other works are part of the National Museum of Modern Art, Tokyo collection.

== Biography ==
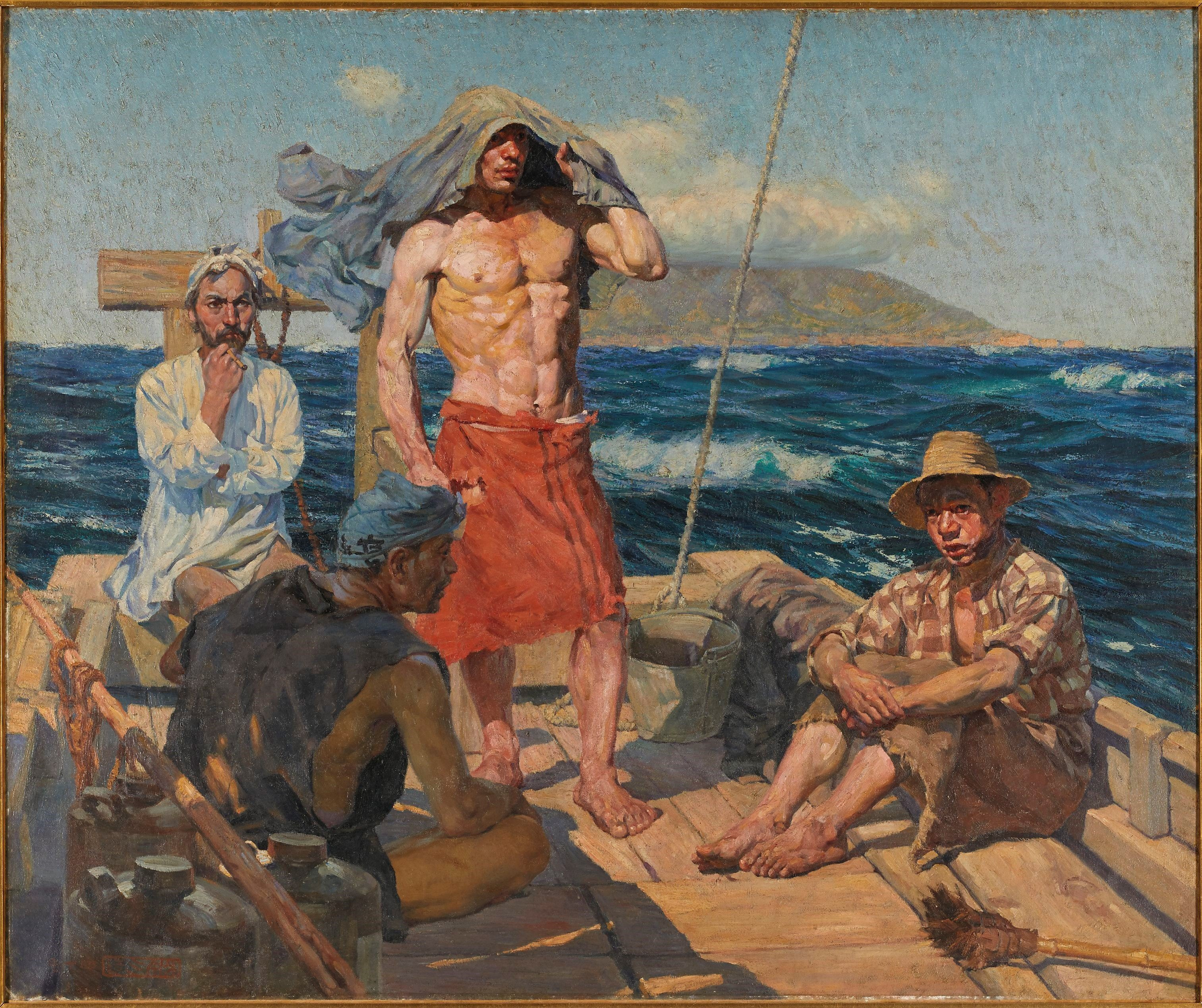
South Wind (1907)

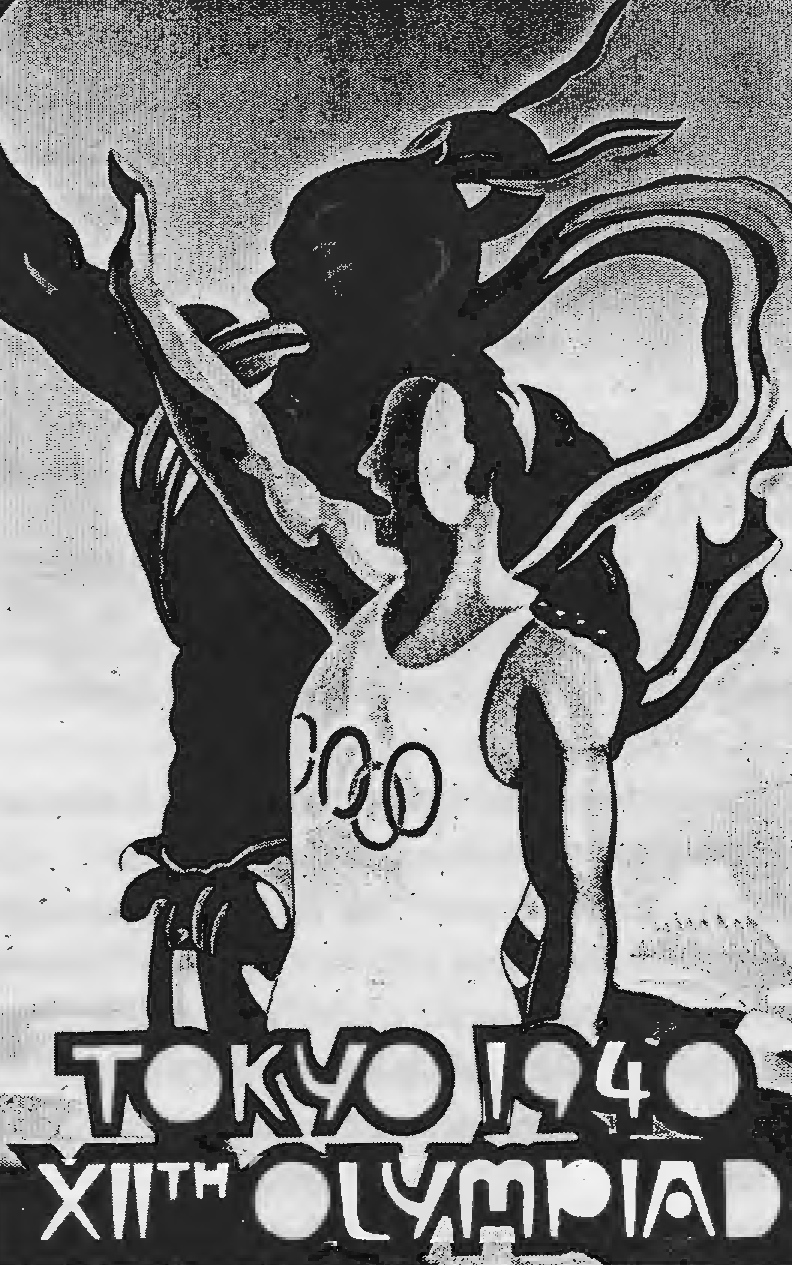
Black and white photograph of Wada's poster for the 1940 Summer Olympics

Wada was born in Hyogo Prefecture, moving to Fukuoka with his family at age 13, and moved again to Tokyo at age 16 with the intention of becoming a painter. He began studying painting in 1899 with the famous painter Kuroda Seiki. In July 1904, he graduated from Tokyo School of Fine Arts. After graduating, he continued his studies in Europe between 1907 and 1915 as a Ministry of Education-sponsored art student. He traveled mainly to France, and studied Western painting as well as craft designs.

In 1932, he became a professor of design at the Tokyo School of Fine Arts, a position he held until 1944. In 1936, he designed the poster for the 1940 Summer Olympics in Tokyo, which was later canceled. The poster depicts athletes with a Nio statue in the background.

In 1945, he reorganized the Japan Standard Color Association into the Japan Color Research Institute and became its chairman. In 1951, he completed Japan's first comprehensive standard color chart, "Color Standards."

In 1953, he was in charge of color design and costume design for the Daiei film Gate of Hell, for which he won the Academy Award for Best Costume Design at the 27th Academy Awards in 1954. Gate of Hell was also highly praised for its beautiful colors at the 7th Cannes Film Festival in the same year, where it won the Palme d'Or.

He was named a Person of Cultural Merit in 1958.

Wada died of aspiration pneumonia on August 22, 1967 at the Tokyo Teishin Hospital at the age of 84.

=== A Dictionary of Color Combinations ===
Between 1933 and 1934, Sanzo Wada published 6-volumes of color studies called Haishoku Soukan (配色総監), documenting over a thousand color combinations. The books were intended to capture traditional Japanese perceptions of color, which differed from Western approaches, and included a wide range of subtle shades and hues.

In 2011, Seigensha published A Dictionary of Color Combinations, a book based on Wada’s original 6-volume work, containing 348 color combinations.

== Bibliography ==
- A Dictionary of Color Combinations (2011)
- A Dictionary of Color Combinations, Volume II (2020)
