= Inoue Chikaya =

Japanese film editor

- Occupation: Film editor

Inoue Chikaya, also known as Shinya Inoue, is a Japanese film editor. He was nominated for an Academy Award in the category Best Film Editing for the film Tora! Tora! Tora!.

== Selected filmography ==
- Tokyo Drifter (1966)
- Tora! Tora! Tora! (1970; co-nominated with James E. Newcom and Pembroke J. Herring)
- G.I. Samurai (1979)
