= Richard Day (art director) =

Canadian art director

- Born: 9 May 1896; Victoria, British Columbia, Canada
- Died: 23 May 1972 (aged 76); Hollywood, California, United States
- Occupation: Art director
- Years active: 1923–1970

Richard Day (9 May 1896 – 23 May 1972) was a Canadian art director in the film industry. He won seven Academy Awards and was nominated for a further 13 in the category of Best Art Direction. He worked on 265 films between 1923 and 1970. He was born in Victoria, British Columbia, Canada, and died in Hollywood, California.

== Early life ==
Day was born on 9 May 1896 in Victoria, British Columbia, to Patience Day and Robert Scott. He was the grandson of Irish antiquarian Robert Day. His father was an architect who began his career in South Africa. As a child, Day developed a spinal curvature that prevented him from attending school and was instead home-schooled. He never graduated from high school or pursued higher education.

Day was a captain in the Canadian Expeditionary Force during World War I. While stationed in London, he met his future wife, who was a nurse's aide. The couple married in London in 1918.

== Career ==
After the war, Day returned to Canada and attempted to begin a career as a commercial artist. In 1920, his father financed a trip to Hollywood in hopes that Day would find a job in the film industry. He was unsuccessful until a chance encounter with director Erich von Stroheim in a hotel lobby led von Stroheim to offer Day work on the film Foolish Wives (1922). Day served as art director on all of von Stroheim's films thereafter, apart from von Stroheim's only sound film, Walking Down Broadway (eventually released as Hello, Sister! in 1933).

Day followed von Stroheim to MGM, working there through most of the 1920s. In 1929, he left MGM to join Samuel Goldwyn. He served as Golywyn's principal art director throughout most of the 1930s. During that time, he won Academy Awards for his production design for The Dark Angel (1935) and Dodsworth (1936). Other films during this period include Dead End (1937) and John Ford's The Hurricane (1937). He then moved to 20th Century Fox, where he was Supervising Art Director. He personally worked on selected films such as How Green Was My Valley (1941), for which he won his third Academy Award.

During World War II, Day independently developed camouflage designs and relief mapping techniques. He was eventually inducted into the United States Marine Corps as a Major. Day became a U.S. citizen in 1942 as a prerequisite to joining the Marines. Once in the service, he devised a technique to make relief models of assault landing sites out of mud and other available materials.

== Academy Awards ==
=== Won ===
Day won seven Academy Awards for Best Art Direction:

- The Dark Angel (1935)
- Dodsworth (1936)
- How Green Was My Valley (1941)
- My Gal Sal (1942)
- This Above All (1942)
- A Streetcar Named Desire (1951)
- On the Waterfront (1954)

=== Nominated ===
He was nominated in the same category for a further 13 films:

- Whoopee! (1931)
- Arrowsmith (1931)
- The Affairs of Cellini (1934)
- Dead End (1937)
- The Goldwyn Follies (1938)
- Down Argentine Way (1940)
- Lillian Russell (1940)
- Blood and Sand (1941)
- The Razor's Edge (1946)
- Joan of Arc (1948)
- Hans Christian Andersen (1952)
- The Greatest Story Ever Told (1965)
- Tora! Tora! Tora! (1970)

== See also ==
- Art Directors Guild Hall of Fame
- Richard Day papers, Margaret Herrick Library, Academy of Motion Picture Arts and Sciences
