= Norman Rockett =

American set decorator

- Born: August 8, 1911; Los Angeles, California, U.S.
- Died: April 5, 1996 (aged 84); Los Angeles, California, U.S.
- Occupation: Set decorator
- Years active: 1953–1988

Norman Rockett (August 8, 1911 – April 5, 1996) was an American set decorator. He was nominated for two Academy Awards in the category Best Art Direction.

== Selected filmography ==
- The Greatest Story Ever Told (1965)
- Planet of the Apes (1968)
- Tora! Tora! Tora! (1970)
