= Taizô Kawashima =

Japanese production designer

Taizō Kawashima
- Other names: Taiji Kawashima; Taizoh Kawashima
- Occupations: Production designer Art director
- Years active: 1946-1992

Taizō Kawashima is a Japanese production designer and art director. He was nominated for an Academy Award in the category Best Art Direction for the film Tora! Tora! Tora!.

== Selected filmography ==
- Tora! Tora! Tora! (1970)
