= Yoshirō Muraki =

Japanese production designer (1924–2009)

Yoshirō Muraki (村木 与四郎, Muraki Yoshirō, August 15, 1924 – October 26, 2009) was a Japanese production designer, art director, and costume designer. Muraki joined Toho Film studio in 1944. He was nominated three times for the Academy Award for Best Art Direction for his work in the films Tora! Tora! Tora! (1970), Kagemusha (1980), and Ran (1985). He was also nominated for the Academy Award for Best Costume Design for his work in Yojimbo (1961). He is most well known for his collaborations with director Akira Kurosawa, having done work on all of Kurosawa's films from Record of a Living Being (1955) onward, with the exception of Dersu Uzala (1975). He was married to Shinobu Muraki.

== Award ==
- Medal with Purple Ribbon (1994)
- The Order of the Rising Sun 4th class. (1999)
