= Jack Martin Smith =

American art director (1911–1993)

- Born: January 2, 1911
- Died: November 7, 1993 (aged 82)
- Occupation: art director
- Years active: 1937-1977
- Employer(s): Metro-Goldwyn-Mayer (1937-1955); 20th Century Fox (1956-1977)

Jack Martin Smith (January 2, 1911 - November 7, 1993) was a highly successful Hollywood art director with over 130 films to his credit and nine Academy Award nominations which ultimately yielded three Oscars.

== Career ==
=== MGM ===
He made his debut in 1937 and two years later found himself working as a production designer on The Wizard of Oz. Smith spent most of his working life at MGM where he worked on such films as Easter Parade (1948), On the Town (1949), and the 1951 version of Show Boat. His first Oscar nomination came in 1949 for his work on Vincente Minnelli's adaptation of Madame Bovary.

=== 20th Century Fox ===
Later, he moved to 20th Century Fox, where he was one of the art directors on the 1956 film version of Carousel. Other big productions to bear his name there include Peyton Place (1957), Return to Peyton Place (1961), Cleopatra (1963, his first Oscar win), Von Ryan's Express (1965), the science fiction epic Fantastic Voyage (1966, which earned him his second Oscar), Planet of the Apes (1968)(with William J. Creber), Butch Cassidy and the Sundance Kid (1969) and MASH (1970). His third Oscar was for Hello, Dolly! in 1969.

=== Television ===
Smith also worked frequently in television on such series as Voyage to the Bottom of the Sea, Lost in Space and Batman.

=== Disney ===
His last film before retirement was the Disney part-animated film Pete's Dragon in 1977.
