= Walter M. Scott =

American set decorator

- Born: November 7, 1906; Cleveland, Ohio, US
- Died: February 2, 1989 (aged 82); Los Angeles, California, US
- Occupation: Set decorator

Walter M. Scott (November 7, 1906 – February 2, 1989) was an American set decorator who worked on films such as The Sound of Music and Butch Cassidy and the Sundance Kid.

Scott enjoyed a spectacular career in Hollywood, working on over 280 films. He won six Academy Awards for set decoration, and was nominated for an additional fifteen.

He started off working in B-movies in 1939, and by 1945 he had graduated to higher profile projects such as The Dolly Sisters.

His first Academy Award nomination came in 1950 for Joseph L. Mankiewicz's drama All About Eve.

Scott's six Academy Awards were for the elaborate reconstruction of Ancient Rome in both The Robe (1953) and the big-budget Cleopatra (1963), for his equally elaborate recreation of the Siamese royal household for The King and I in 1956, for a much starker portrayal of the tiny cramped spaces occupied by a Dutch Jewish family in wartime Holland in The Diary of Anne Frank (1959), for the futuristic settings of Fantastic Voyage in 1966, and for a rich tapestry of turn-of-the-century colour in Hello, Dolly! in 1969.

His last film was Ace Eli and Rodger of the Skies in 1973.
