= List of Gene Hackman performances =

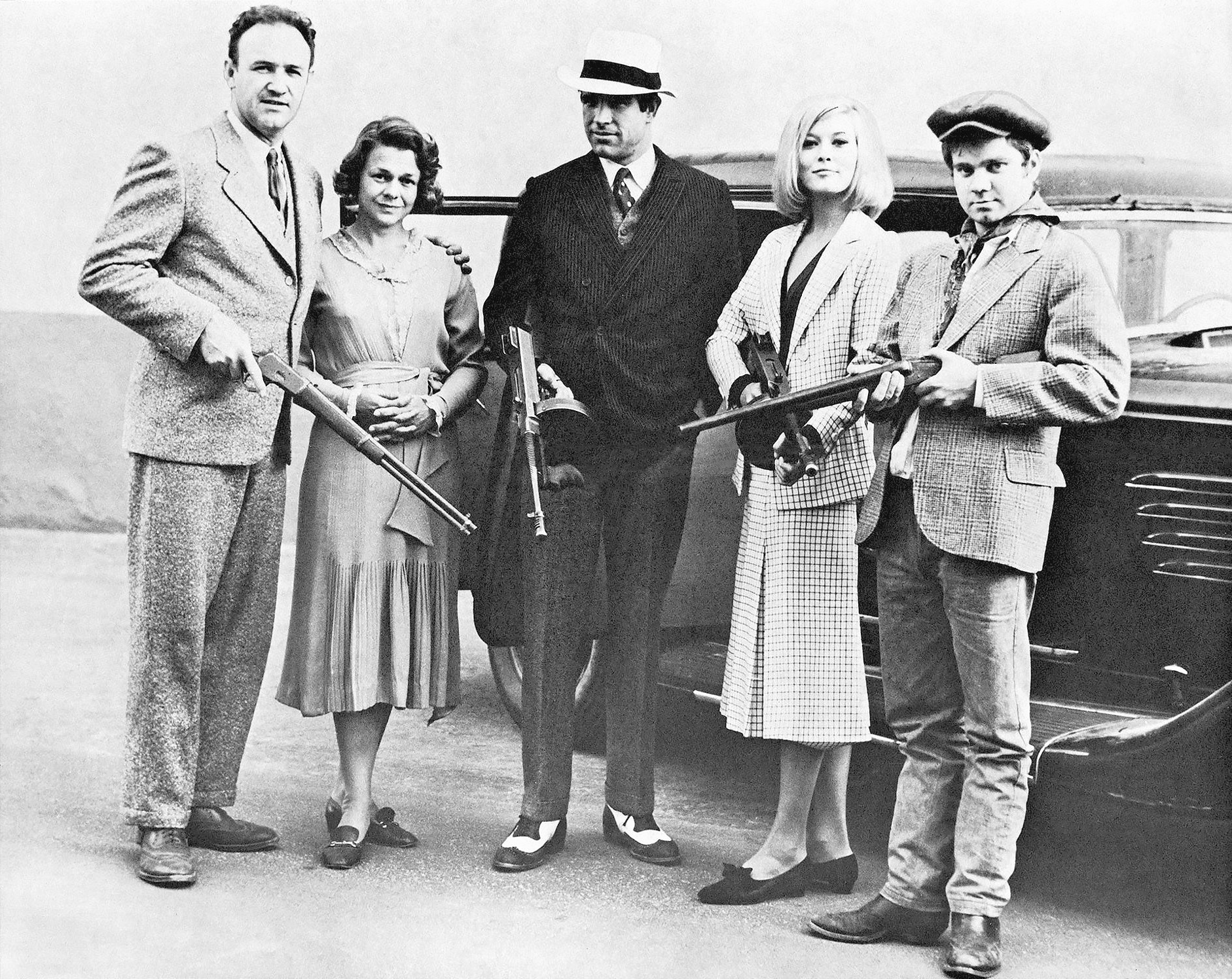
Cast of Bonnie and Clyde (1967); from L to R: Gene Hackman, Estelle Parsons, Warren Beatty, Faye Dunaway, and Michael J. Pollard.

Gene Hackman (January 30, 1930 – c. February 18, 2025) was an American actor. Considered one of the greatest actors of his generation and a paragon of the New Hollywood movement, Hackman's mainstream acting career spanned over four decades. He received multiple accolades.

His cinematic debut was as an uncredited policeman in Mad Dog Coll (1961), but he and fellow newcomer Jessica Walter received recognition for their cameo appearances in the film Lilith (1964), which Hackman succeeded with Hawaii (1966). However, his breakout film role was that of Buck Barrow, a member of the notorious bank robbing Barrow Gang, in Arthur Penn's groundbreakingly violent Bonnie and Clyde (1967). All five main cast members earned nominations at the Academy Awards, including Hackman for Best Supporting Actor (sharing the same category as co-star Michael J. Pollard). Hackman followed this up with several 1969 films, including Downhill Racer and Marooned; as well as the drama I Never Sang for My Father (1970), which reunited him with his Bonnie and Clyde on-screen wife, Estelle Parsons. For this film, he earned his second Supporting Actor Oscar nomination.

Hackman next portrayed what was to become one of his signature roles—the iconic Det. Jimmy "Popeye" Doyle—in William Friedkin's The French Connection (1971). For this, he received the Academy Award for Best Actor, Golden Globe Award for Best Actor in a Motion Picture – Drama, BAFTA Award for Best Actor in a Leading Role, and several others. He subsequently began starring in a number of primarily lead roles, such as The Hunting Party (1971); The Poseidon Adventure and Prime Cut (both 1972); Scarecrow (1973); The Conversation and Young Frankenstein (both 1974); and Night Moves (1975). Also in 1975, he reprised his role as Popeye Doyle in the sequel French Connection II.

By the end of the decade his output began to slow down, but nevertheless still featured him in a variety of supporting and leading parts. Such films during this stretch include A Bridge Too Far (1977); Superman (1978); Superman II (1980); Reds (1981); Under Fire, Eureka, and Uncommon Valor (all 1983); Twice in a Lifetime (1985); Hoosiers and Power (both 1986); No Way Out (1987); Another Woman (1988); The Package (1989); and Postcards from the Edge (1990). He also returned to the Superman franchise, after being absent from the third film, in Superman IV: The Quest for Peace (also 1987). The following year, he earned his fourth overall Academy Award nomination, once again for Leading Actor, for Mississippi Burning (1988).

Heading into the 1990s, Hackman was more ubiquitous and prolific than ever. He also co-starred in Clint Eastwood's neo-western Unforgiven (1992), which earned him his fifth and final Oscar nomination and his second Academy Award win—this time for Supporting Actor, making him one of the few actors to win Oscars in both the leading and supporting categories. Just as with his first Academy Award win, he also won the BAFTA Award for Best Actor in a Supporting Role and the Golden Globe Award for Best Supporting Actor – Motion Picture, in addition to sweeping the majority of critics' prizes. This led to an increase in western villain and other tough guy roles, such as in the films The Firm (1993); Wyatt Earp (1994); The Quick and the Dead, Crimson Tide, and Get Shorty (all 1995).

The remainder of his career saw him tackling a variety of genres, including comedy more frequently. These penultimate films include The Birdcage (1996); Absolute Power (1997); Enemy of the State and a voice role in Antz (both 1998); The Replacements (2000); Heartbreakers, Behind Enemy Lines, and The Mexican (all 2001); and Runaway Jury (2003). One of his last, and most acclaimed roles, was as the patriarch in the ensemble allegory dramedy The Royal Tenenbaums (2001), which garnered him the Golden Globe Award for Best Actor in a Motion Picture – Musical or Comedy. (He also received the honorary Cecil B. DeMille Award the following year.) His final film was the comedy Welcome to Mooseport (2004), after which Hackman retired from acting until his death in 2025.

== Acting credits ==
=== Film ===
Year	Title	Role	Notes	Ref.
1961	Mad Dog Coll	Policeman	Uncredited	
1964	Lilith	Norman		
1966	Hawaii	John Whipple		
1967	Banning	Tommy Del Gaddo		
1967	Community Shelter Planning	Donald Ross	Short film	
1967	A Covenant with Death	Alfred Harmsworth		
1967	First to Fight	Sergeant Tweed		
1967	Bonnie and Clyde	Buck Barrow		
1968	The Split	Lt. Walter Brill		
1969	Riot	"Red" Fraker		
1969	The Gypsy Moths	Joe Browdy		
1969	Downhill Racer	Eugene Claire		
1969	Marooned	"Buzz" Lloyd		
1970	I Never Sang for My Father	Gene Garrison		
1971	Doctors' Wives	Dave Randolph		
1971	The Hunting Party	Brandt Ruger		
1971	The French Connection	Jimmy "Popeye" Doyle		
1972	Prime Cut	Mary Ann		
1972	The Poseidon Adventure	Rev. Frank Scott		
1972	Cisco Pike	Sergeant Leo Holland		
1973	Scarecrow	Max Millan		
1974	The Conversation	Harry Caul		
1974	Young Frankenstein	Harold, The Blind Man	Cameo	
1974	Zandy's Bride	Zandy Allan		
1975	French Connection II	Jimmy "Popeye" Doyle		
1975	Lucky Lady	Kibby Womack		
1975	Night Moves	Harry Moseby		
1975	Bite the Bullet	Sam Clayton		
1977	The Domino Principle	Roy Tucker		
1977	A Bridge Too Far	Stanisław Sosabowski		
1977	March or Die	Major William Sherman Foster		
1978	Superman	Lex Luthor		
1980	Superman II	Lex Luthor		
1981	All Night Long	George Dupler		
1981	Reds	Pete Van Wherry		
1983	Under Fire	Alex Grazier		
1983	Two of a Kind	God	Voice; uncredited	
1983	Uncommon Valor	Col. Jason Rhodes, USMC (Ret.)		
1983	Eureka	Jack McCann		
1984	Misunderstood	Ned Rawley		
1985	Twice in a Lifetime	Harry MacKenzie		
1985	Target	Walter Lloyd / Duncan "Duke" Potter		
1986	Power	Wilfred Buckley		
1986	Hoosiers	Coach Norman Dale		
1987	No Way Out	David Brice		
1987	Superman IV: The Quest for Peace	Lex Luthor, Voice of Nuclear Man		
1988	Bat*21	Lt. Col Iceal Hambleton, USAF		
1988	Split Decisions	Danny McGuinn		
1988	Another Woman	Larry Lewis		
1988	Full Moon in Blue Water	Floyd		
1988	Mississippi Burning	Rupert Anderson		
1989	The Package	Sergeant Johnny Gallagher		
1990	Loose Cannons	Det. MacArthur "Mac" Stern		
1990	Postcards from the Edge	Lowell Kolchek		
1990	Narrow Margin	Robert Caulfield		
1991	Class Action	Jedediah Tucker Ward		
1991	Company Business	Sam Boyd		
1992	Unforgiven	Sheriff Bill "Little Bill" Daggett		
1993	The Firm	Avery Tolar		
1993	Geronimo: An American Legend	Brigadier General George Crook		
1994	Wyatt Earp	Nicholas Porter Earp		
1995	The Quick and the Dead	John Herod		
1995	Crimson Tide	Captain Frank Ramsey		
1995	Get Shorty	Harry Zimm		
1996	The Birdcage	Senator Kevin Keeley		
1996	Extreme Measures	Dr. Lawrence Myrick		
1996	The Chamber	Sam Cayhall		
1997	Absolute Power	President Alan Richmond		
1998	Twilight	Jack Ames		
1998	Antz	General Mandible	Voice	
1998	Enemy of the State	Edward "Brill" Lyle		
2000	Under Suspicion	Henry Hearst	Also executive producer	
2000	The Replacements	Coach Jimmy McGinty		
2001	The Mexican	Arnold Margolese		
2001	Heartbreakers	William B. Tensy		
2001	Heist	Joe Moore		
2001	Behind Enemy Lines	Admiral Leslie Reigart		
2001	The Royal Tenenbaums	Royal Tenenbaum		
2003	Runaway Jury	Rankin Fitch		
2004	Welcome to Mooseport	Monroe "Eagle" Cole	Final film role	

=== Television ===
Year	Title	Role	Notes	Ref.
1959–1962	The United States Steel Hour	Various characters	8 episodes	
1959–1964	Brenner	Officer Richard Clayburn / Patrolman Claibourne	3 episodes	
1961	Tallahassee 7000	Joe Lawson	Episode: "The Fugitive"	
1961–1963	The Defenders	Jerry Warner / Stanley McGuirk	2 episodes	
1963	Look Up and Live	Frank Collins	Episode: "Look Up and Live"	
1963	Naked City	Mr. Jasper	Episode: "Prime of Life"	
1963	Route 66	Motorist	Episode: "Who Will Cheer My Bonny Bride?"	
1963	The DuPont Show of the Week	Douglas McCann	Episode: "Ride with Terror"	
1963	East Side West Side	Policeman	Episode: "Creeps Live Here"	
1966	The Trials of O'Brien	Roger Nathan	Episode: "The Only Game in Town"	
1966	Hawk	Houston Worth	Episode: "Do Not Mutilate or Spindle"	
1967	The F.B.I.	Herb Kenyon	Episode: "The Courier"	
1967	The Invaders	Tom Jessup	Episode: "The Spores"	
1967	Iron Horse	Harry Wadsworth	Episode: "Leopards Try, But Leopards Can't"	
1967	CBS Playhouse	Ned	Episode: "My Father and My Mother"	
1967	I Spy	Frank Hunter	Episode: "Happy Birthday Everybody"	
1967	Insight	Holt	Episode: "Confrontation"	
1968	Shadow on the Land	Reverend Thomas Davis	Television film	
2007	America's Game: The Super Bowl Champions	Narrator	4 episodes	
2008	Diners, Drive-Ins and Dives	Himself	Episode: "What's for Breakfast?"	
2016	The Unknown Flag Raiser of Iwo Jima	Narrator	Voice; documentary	
2017	We, the Marines	Narrator	Voice; documentary	

=== Theatre ===
Year	Title	Role	Notes	Ref.
1960–1961	The Premise	Various roles	The Premise, Bleecker Street	
1963	Children from Their Games	Charles Widgin Rochambeau	Morosco Theatre, Broadway	
1963	A Rainy Day in Newark	Sidney Rice	Belasco Theatre, Broadway	
1963	Come to the Palace of Sin	Performer	Lucille Lortel Theatre, Off-Broadway	
1964–1965	Any Wednesday	Cass Henderson	Music Box Theatre / George Abbott Theatre	
1964–1965	Poor Richard	Sydney Caroll	Helen Hayes Theatre, Broadway	
1967	The Natural Look	Dr. Barney Harris	Longacre Theatre, Broadway	
1967	Fragments / The Basement	Baxter / Zach	Cherry Lane Theatre, Off-Broadway	
1992	Death and the Maiden	Roberto Miranda	Brooks Atkinson Theatre, Broadway	

== See also ==
- List of awards and nominations received by Gene Hackman
