= List of awards and nominations received by Gene Hackman =

Gene Hackman awards and nominations
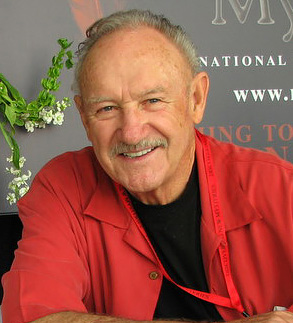
- Hackman in 2008
Awards and nominations
Award	Wins	Nominations
Academy Awards	2	5
Actor Awards	1	2
BAFTA Awards	2	7
Golden Globes	3	8

Totals (Note: Certain award groups do not simply award one winner. They acknowledge several different recipients, have runners-up, and have third place. Since this is a specific recognition and is different from losing an award, runner-up mentions are considered wins in this award tally. For simplification and to avoid errors, each award in this list has been presumed to have had a prior nomination.)
- Wins: 78
- Nominations: 170

American actor Gene Hackman was known for his distinctive and authoritative leading roles on stage and screen. Over his four decade long career he received two Academy Awards, an Actor Award, two BAFTA Awards, and three Golden Globe Awards.

Hackman's two Academy Award wins were for Best Actor for his role as Jimmy "Popeye" Doyle in William Friedkin's action thriller The French Connection (1971) and for Best Supporting Actor for his role as a villainous Sheriff in Clint Eastwood's Western film Unforgiven (1992). He was also Oscar-nominated for three other roles: that of Buck Barrow in the crime drama Bonnie and Clyde (1967); a college professor in the drama I Never Sang for My Father (1970); and an FBI agent in the historical drama Mississippi Burning (1988).

He won two Golden Globes for both The French Connection (1971) and Unforgiven (1992) as well as the Golden Globe Award for Best Actor – Motion Picture Musical or Comedy for his comedic role as the family patriarch in the Wes Anderson comedy-drama film The Royal Tenenbaums (2001). He was Globe-nominated for his roles in The Conversation (1974), French Connection II (1975), Under Fire (1983), Twice in a Lifetime (1985), and Mississippi Burning (1988). Hackman received the Golden Globe Cecil B. DeMille Award in 2003.

== Major associations ==
=== Academy Awards ===
Year	Category	Nominated work	Result	Ref.
1968	Best Supporting Actor	Bonnie & Clyde	Nominated	
1971	Best Supporting Actor	I Never Sang for My Father	Nominated	
1972	Best Actor	The French Connection	Won	
1989	Best Actor	Mississippi Burning	Nominated	
1993	Best Supporting Actor	Unforgiven	Won	

=== Actor Awards ===
Year	Category	Nominated work	Result	Ref.
1996	Outstanding Cast in a Motion Picture	Get Shorty	Nominated	
1997	Outstanding Cast in a Motion Picture	The Birdcage	Won	

=== BAFTA Awards ===
Year	Category	Nominated work	Result	Ref.
British Academy Film Awards
1973	Best Actor in a Leading Role	The French Connection / The Poseidon Adventure	Won	
1975	Best Actor in a Leading Role	The Conversation	Nominated	
1976	Best Actor in a Leading Role	French Connection II / Night Moves	Nominated	
1978	Best Actor in a Supporting Role	Superman	Nominated	
1992	Best Actor in a Supporting Role	Unforgiven	Won	

=== Golden Globe Awards ===
Year	Category	Nominated work	Result	Ref.
1972	Best Actor – Motion Picture Drama	The French Connection	Won	
1975	Best Actor – Motion Picture Drama	The Conversation	Nominated	
1976	Best Actor – Motion Picture Drama	French Connection II	Nominated	
1984	Best Supporting Actor – Motion Picture	Under Fire	Nominated	
1986	Best Actor – Motion Picture Drama	Twice in a Lifetime	Nominated	
1989	Best Actor – Motion Picture Drama	Mississippi Burning	Nominated	
1993	Best Supporting Actor – Motion Picture	Unforgiven	Won	
2002	Best Actor – Motion Picture Musical or Comedy	The Royal Tenenbaums	Won	
2003	Cecil B. DeMille Award		Honored	

== Miscellaneous awards ==
Year	Association	Category	Project	Result	Ref.
1988	Berlin International Film Festival	Silver Bear for Best Actor	Mississippi Burning	Won	
1988	David di Donatello Award	Best Foreign Actor	Mississippi Burning	Nominated	
1971	National Board of Review	Best Actor	The French Connection	Won	
1974	National Board of Review	Best Actor	The Conversation	Won	
1988	National Board of Review	Best Actor	Mississippi Burning	Won	
1996	Satellite Award	Best Supporting Actor – Motion Picture	The Birdcage	Nominated	
2001	Satellite Award	Best Actor – Motion Picture Musical or Comedy	The Royal Tenenbaums	Nominated	

== Film critic awards ==
Year	Association	Category	Project	Result
1967	National Society of Film Critics	Best Supporting Actor	Bonnie & Clyde	Won
1969	New York Film Critics Circle	Best Actor	Downhill Racer	3rd place
1971	Kansas City Film Critics Circle Award	Best Actor	The French Connection	Won
1971	National Society of Film Critics	Best Actor	The French Connection	3rd place
1971	New York Film Critics Circle	Best Actor	The French Connection	Won
1974	New York Film Critics Circle	Best Actor	The Conversation	2nd Place
1981	National Society of Film Critics	Best Actor	All Night Long	2nd Place
1988	Los Angeles Film Critics Association	Best Actor	Bat*21	2nd Place
1988	Los Angeles Film Critics Association	Best Actor	Mississippi Burning	2nd Place
1988	National Society of Film Critics	Best Actor	Mississippi Burning	2nd Place
1988	Chicago Film Critics Association	Best Actor	Mississippi Burning	Nominated
1988	Los Angeles Film Critics Association	Best Actor	Another Woman	2nd Place
1988	Los Angeles Film Critics Association	Best Actor	Full Moon in Blue Water	2nd Place
1988	Los Angeles Film Critics Association	Best Actor	Split Decisions	2nd Place
1992	Boston Society of Film Critics	Best Supporting Actor	Unforgiven	Won
1992	Kansas City Film Critics Circle	Best Supporting Actor	Unforgiven	Won
1992	Los Angeles Film Critics Association	Best Supporting Actor	Unforgiven	Won
1992	National Society of Film Critics	Best Supporting Actor	Unforgiven	Won
1992	New York Film Critics Circle	Best Supporting Actor	Unforgiven	Won
1992	Chicago Film Critics Association	Best Supporting Actor	Unforgiven	Nominated
1995	Chicago Film Critics Association	Best Supporting Actor	Get Shorty	Nominated
2001	Boston Society of Film Critics	Best Actor	The Royal Tenenbaums	2nd Place
2001	Chicago Film Critics Association	Best Actor	The Royal Tenenbaums	Won
2001	National Society of Film Critics	Best Actor	The Royal Tenenbaums	Won
2001	Phoenix Film Critics Society	Best Acting Ensemble	The Royal Tenenbaums	Nominated
2001	Phoenix Film Critics Society	Best Actor	The Royal Tenenbaums	Nominated

== Military awards ==
Gene Hackman's military decorations and medals include:

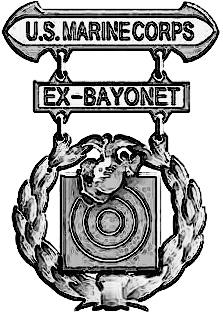
