= Gene Hackman =

American actor (1930–2025)

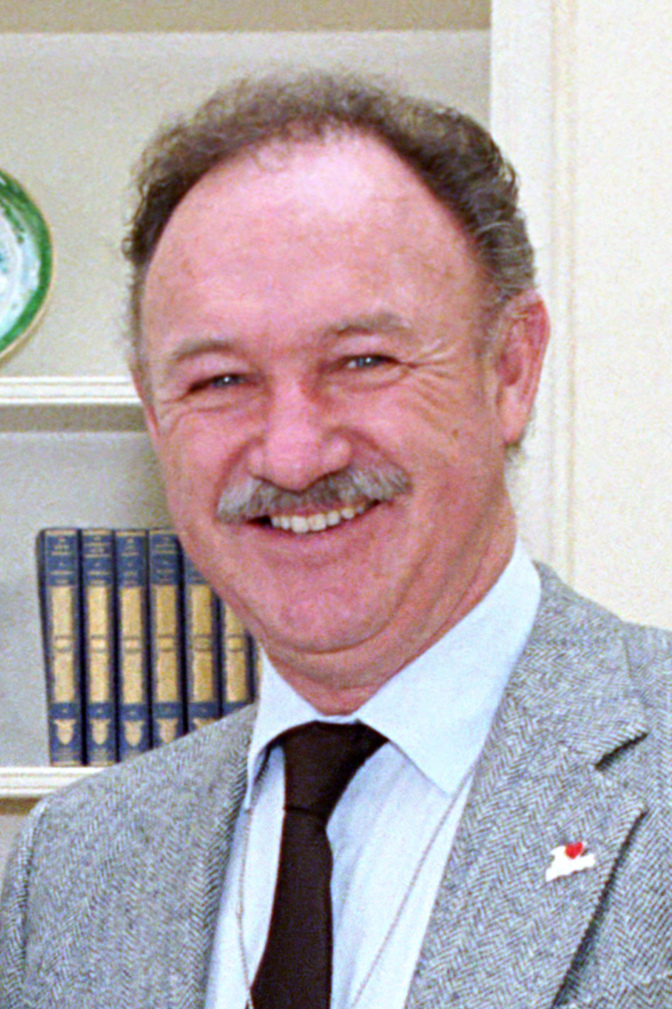
- Hackman at the White House in 1987
- Born: Eugene Allen Hackman; January 30, 1930; San Bernardino, California, U.S.
- Died: c. February 18, 2025 (aged 95); Santa Fe, New Mexico, U.S.
- Occupation: Actor
- Years active: 1956–2004
- Works: Full list
- Spouses: Faye Maltese (m. 1956; div. 1986) Betsy Arakawa (m. 1991; died 2025)
- Children: 3
- Awards: Full list

Eugene Allen Hackman (January 30, 1930 – c. February 18, 2025) was an American actor. Considered one of the greatest actors of his generation and a paragon of the New Hollywood movement, Hackman's mainstream acting career spanned over four decades. He received several accolades, including two Academy Awards, two British Academy Film Awards, one Screen Actors Guild Award, one Silver Bear and four Golden Globe Awards.

Born in San Bernardino, California, Hackman developed an interest in acting from a very young age. He made his credited film debut in the drama Lilith (1964). He later won two Academy Awards; his first for Best Actor for his role as Jimmy "Popeye" Doyle in William Friedkin's action thriller The French Connection, and his second for Best Supporting Actor for playing a cruel sheriff in Clint Eastwood's western Unforgiven. He was Oscar-nominated for playing Buck Barrow in the crime drama Bonnie and Clyde, a college professor in I Never Sang for My Father, and an FBI agent in the historical drama Mississippi Burning.

Hackman gained further fame for his portrayal of Lex Luthor in three of the Superman films. His other notable roles include The Conversation, Night Moves, Hoosiers, No Way Out, Crimson Tide, The Quick and the Dead, Get Shorty, Enemy of the State, and The Royal Tenenbaums. He retired from acting in 2004, writing novels and occasionally narrating television documentaries, up until 2017. Hackman's health declined in his final years. He was found dead, along with his wife, at his home in Santa Fe, New Mexico. His cause of death was deemed a combination of Alzheimer's disease, severe heart disease, and kidney disease.

== Early life and military service ==
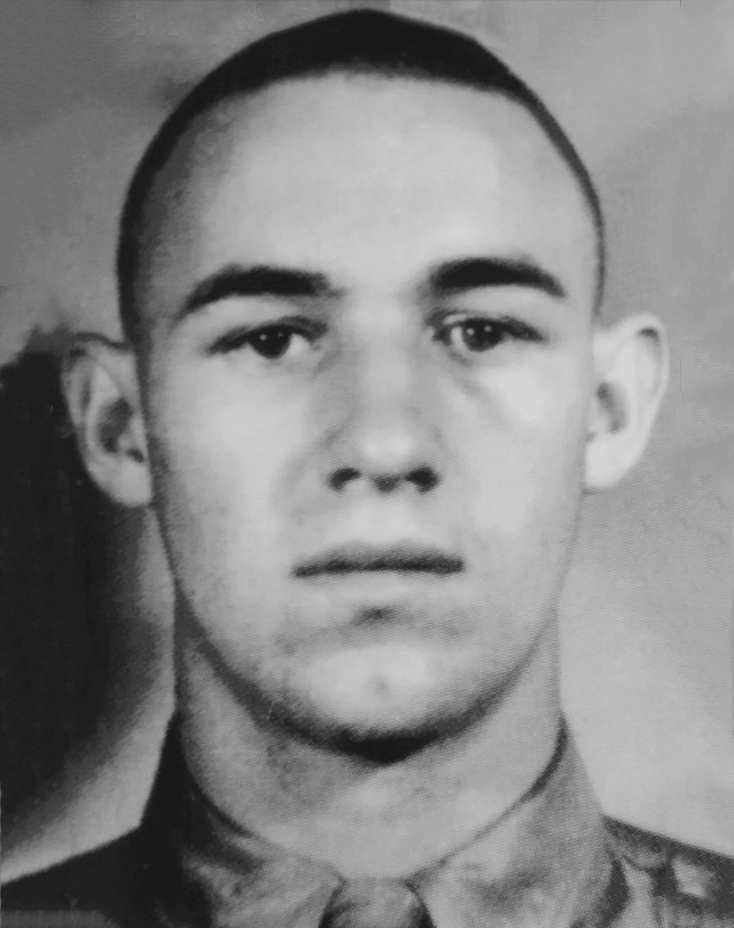
Hackman in the U.S. Marine Corps

Eugene Allen Hackman was born on January 30, 1930, in San Bernardino, California, to Anna Lyda Elizabeth (née Gray) and Eugene Ezra Hackman. He also had a brother named Richard. Anna was an actress, painter, pianist, and waitress, from Sarnia, Ontario, Canada. Eugene Sr. operated the printing press for the local newspaper, the Commercial-News. The family moved frequently before eventually settling in Danville, Illinois, where they lived in the house of Anna's English-born mother, Beatrice. Hackman later stated that he decided to become an actor at the age of 10. When Hackman was 13 years old, Eugene Sr. divorced Anna, and left the family.

Hackman spent his sophomore year at Storm Lake High School in Storm Lake, Iowa. He left home at the age of 16, lied about his age to enlist in the U.S. Marine Corps, and served four and a half years as a field radio operator. Hackman was stationed in China (Qingdao and later in Shanghai) as part of Operation Beleaguer, the US occupation of parts of China. He later stated that part of his role there was destroying Japanese military equipment so that Communist revolutionaries did not capture it. After the Communists conquered the mainland in 1949, he was reassigned to Hawaii and Japan.

After his discharge in 1951, Hackman moved to New York City, where he worked at various jobs. He later began studying journalism and television production at the University of Illinois under the G.I. Bill, but left before graduating, and moved back to California. In 1962, Anna died in a fire she had accidentally started while smoking.

== Career ==
=== 1956–1969: Career beginnings ===
Acting was something I wanted to do since I was 10 and saw my first movie, I was so captured by the action guys. Jimmy Cagney was my favorite. Without realizing it, I could see he had tremendous timing and vitality.

— Gene Hackman

In 1956, Hackman began pursuing an acting career. He joined the Pasadena Playhouse in California, where he befriended another aspiring actor, Dustin Hoffman. Seen as outsiders by their classmates, Hackman and Hoffman were voted "the least likely to succeed", and Hackman got the lowest score the Pasadena Playhouse had yet to give. Determined to prove them wrong, Hackman moved to New York City. A 2004 article in Vanity Fair described Hackman, Hoffman, and Robert Duvall as struggling California-born actors and close friends, sharing New York apartments in various two-person combinations in the 1960s.

To support himself between acting jobs, Hackman worked at Howard Johnson's., There, he was encountered by an instructor from the Pasadena Playhouse, who said that Hackman's job at the restaurant proved that he "wouldn't amount to anything." A Marine officer who saw him as a doorman said, "Hackman, you're a sorry son of a bitch."

Hackman's response was:

It was more psychological warfare, because I wasn't going to let those fuckers get me down. I insisted with myself that I would continue to do whatever it took to get a job. It was like me against them, and in some way, unfortunately, I still feel that way. But I think if you're really interested in acting there is a part of you that relishes the struggle. It's a narcotic in the way that you are trained to do this work and nobody will let you do it, so you're a little bit nuts. You lie to people, you cheat, you do whatever it takes to get an audition, get a job.

Hackman began performing in several off-Broadway plays, starting with Witness for the Prosecution in 1957 at the Gateway Playhouse in Bellport, New York, and Come to the Palace of Sin in 1963. He got various bit roles in the film Mad Dog Coll, and on multiple television series: Tallahassee 7000, The United States Steel Hour, Route 66, Naked City, The Defenders, The DuPont Show of the Week, East Side/West Side, and Brenner. In 1963, he made his Broadway debuts in the short-running Children From Their Games and A Rainy Day in Newark. However, Any Wednesday with actress Sandy Dennis was a huge Broadway success in 1964. This opened the door to film work. His first credited role was in Lilith, with Jean Seberg and Warren Beatty in the leading roles.

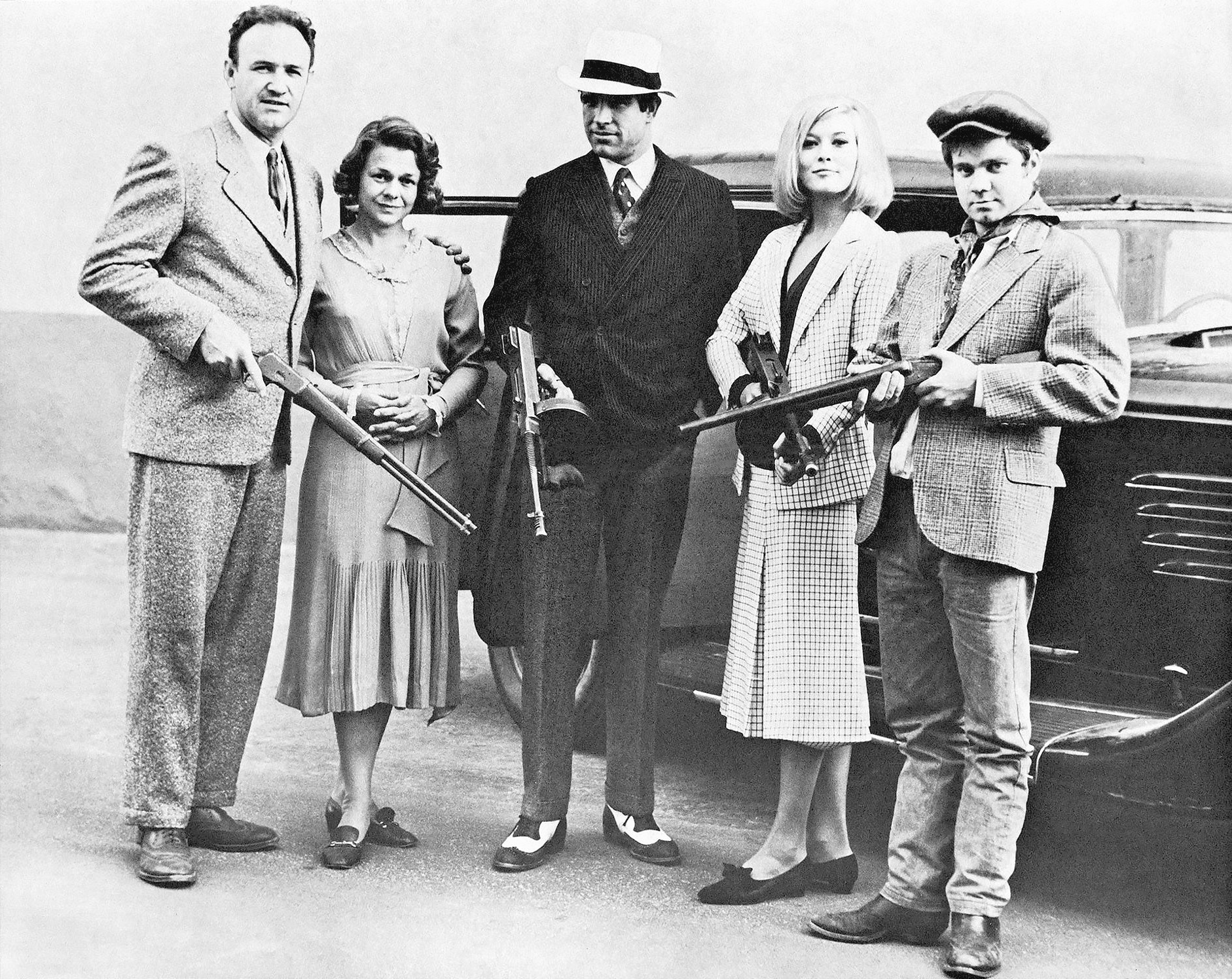
Hackman (left) with the cast of Bonnie and Clyde in 1967

Hackman returned to Broadway in Poor Richard (1964–65) by Jean Kerr, which ran over a hundred performances. He continued to do television – The Trials of O'Brien, Hawk, and The F.B.I. – and had a small part as Dr. John Whipple in the epic film Hawaii. He had small roles in features like First to Fight (1967), A Covenant with Death (1967), and Banning (1967). Hackman was originally cast as Mr. Robinson in the 1967 Mike Nichols independent romantic comedy film The Graduate, but Nichols fired him three weeks into rehearsal for being "too young" for the role. He was replaced by Murray Hamilton. Also in 1967, he appeared in an episode of the television series The Invaders, titled "The Spores", and as Buck Barrow in 1967's biographical crime drama Bonnie and Clyde, which earned him an Academy Award nomination for Best Supporting Actor.

A return to Broadway that same year in The Natural Look, ran for just one performance. Additionally, he performed off-Broadway in Fragments and the Basement. Hackman was in episodes of Iron Horse ("Leopards Try, But Leopards Can't") and Insight ("Confrontation"). In 1968, he appeared in an episode of I Spy, in the role of Hunter, in the episode "Happy Birthday... Everybody". That same year, he starred in the CBS Playhouse episode "My Father and My Mother" and the dystopian television film Shadow on the Land. In 1969, he played a ski coach in Downhill Racer and an astronaut in Marooned. Also that year, he played a member of a barnstorming skydiving team that entertained mostly at county fairs, a film which also inspired many to pursue skydiving and has a cult-like status amongst skydivers as a result: The Gypsy Moths. Hackman supported Jim Brown in two films, The Split (1968) and Riot (1969). Hackman nearly accepted the role of Mike Brady for the TV series The Brady Bunch, but his agent advised that he decline it in exchange for a more promising role, which he did, but this story is said to have been exaggerated.

=== 1970–1979: Breakthrough and stardom ===
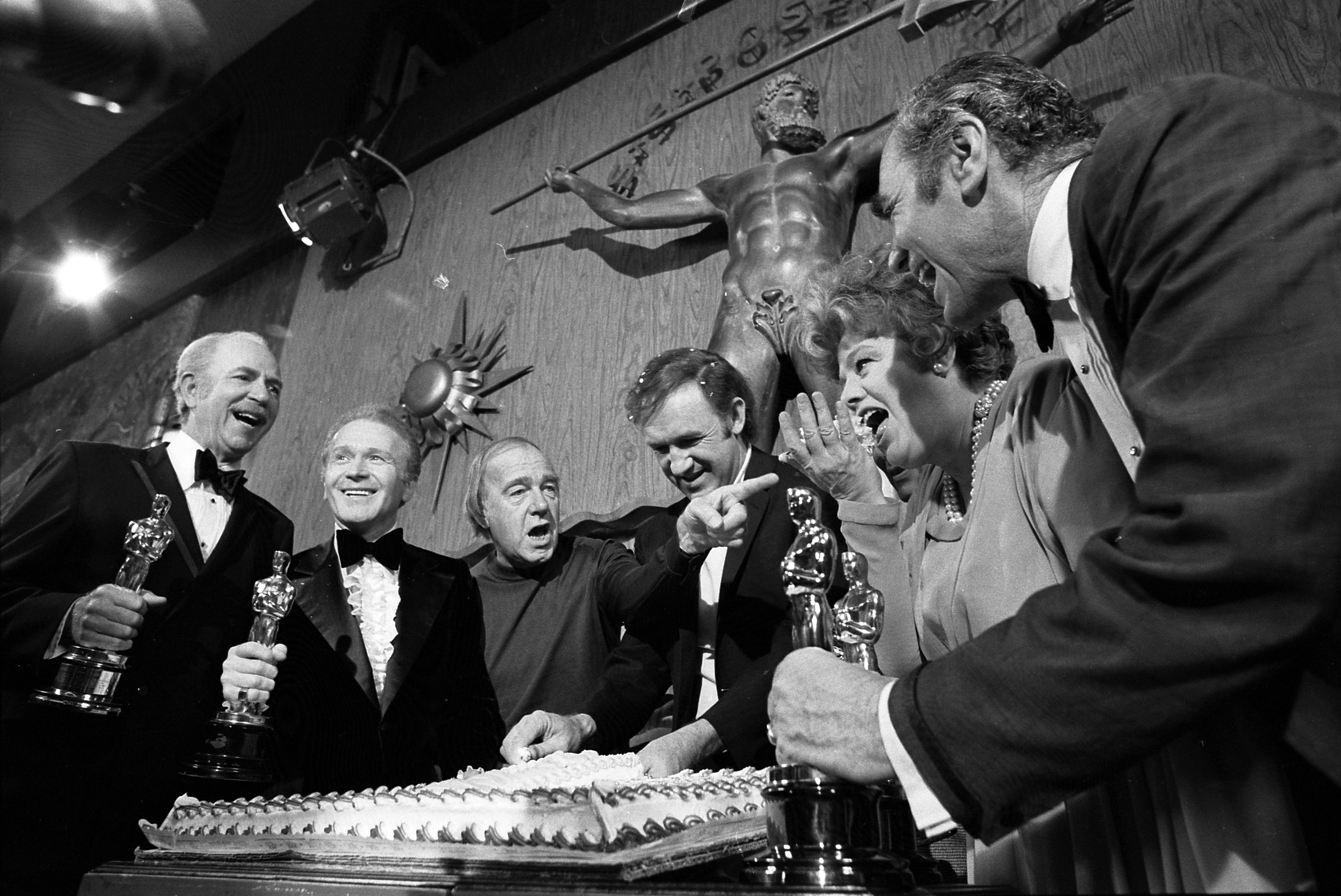
Hackman (4th from the left) while celebrating the Academy Awards with cast members of The Poseidon Adventure in 1972

Hackman was nominated for a second Oscar for an Academy Award for Best Supporting Actor for his role in the drama film I Never Sang for My Father (1970), directed by Gilbert Cates. Hackman acted opposite Melvyn Douglas, where they played father and son who are unable to communicate. Roger Ebert wrote of his performance, "Much of the film is just between the two of them and the characters seem to work so well because Douglas and Hackman respond to each other in every shot; the effect is not of acting, but as if the story were happening right now while we see it." He starred in the drama Doctors' Wives (1971) and the western film The Hunting Party (1971). He won his first Academy Award for Best Actor for his performance as New York City Police Detective Jimmy "Popeye" Doyle in the crime drama The French Connection (1971), directed by William Friedkin. This film marked his graduation to stardom. Robert B. Frederick of Variety praised the performances of Hackman and Roy Scheider, writing, "They are very believable as two hard-nosed narcotics officers" who are also "overworked, tired and mean".

After The French Connection, Hackman starred in ten films (not including his cameo as a blind man in the Mel Brooks-directed satirical horror comedy film Young Frankenstein in 1974) over the next three years, making him the most prolific actor in Hollywood during that time frame. He followed The French Connection with leading roles in the drama Cisco Pike (1972), the action crime thriller Prime Cut (1972), and the disaster film The Poseidon Adventure (1972). He also starred in the road comedy-drama Scarecrow (1973) alongside Al Pacino, which was Hackman's favorite role of his career and won the Palme d'Or at the Cannes Film Festival. The following year, he starred as a surveillance expert in the neo-noir mystery thriller The Conversation (1974), directed by Francis Ford Coppola, which was nominated for several Oscars and also won the Palme d'Or at Cannes. That same year, Hackman appeared in what would become one of his most famous comedic roles, as Harold the Blind Man in Young Frankenstein. Hackman also appeared in the western Zandy's Bride (1974) and the neo-noir film Night Moves (1975) for director Arthur Penn.

Hackman played one of Teddy Roosevelt's former Rough Riders in the Western horse-race saga Bite the Bullet (1975). He reprised his Oscar-winning role as Doyle in the sequel French Connection II (1975), for which he was nominated for the BAFTA Award for Best Actor in a Leading Role and the Golden Globe Award for Best Actor in a Motion Picture – Drama. He co-starred with Burt Reynolds and Liza Minnelli in the musical Lucky Lady (1975), directed by Stanley Donen, a notorious flop. After making the neo-noir thriller The Domino Principle (1977) for Stanley Kramer, Hackman was part of an all-star cast in the war film A Bridge Too Far (1977), playing Polish General Stanisław Sosabowski, and was an officer in the French Foreign Legion in March or Die (1977). Hackman was required to shave his head and shave off his mustache to play the character, but he refused to do either. So Richard Donner, who had a mustache but had shaved it off, put on a fake mustache and challenged Hackman to shave off both of their mustaches. Hackman agreed and shaved his off, so Donner calmly removed the fake mustache and Hackman went into a full-blown rage in the makeup room, followed by a fit of laughter at Donner's wit. Hackman showed a talent for both comedy and the "slow burn" as criminal mastermind Lex Luthor opposite Christopher Reeve in the leading role in the superhero film Superman: The Movie (1978). Ron Pennington of The Hollywood Reporter wrote of his performance, "Hackman plays Lex Luthor, 'the greatest criminal mind of our time,' with an effective light touch, making him humorous but not out-and-out comical." He reprised the role for two of its sequels, Superman II (1980) and Superman IV: The Quest for Peace (1987).

=== 1980–1999: Established career and acclaim ===
Gene is someone who is a very intuitive and instinctive actor ... The brilliance of Gene Hackman is that he can look at a scene and he can cut through to what is necessary, and he does it with extraordinary economy – he's the quintessential movie actor. He's never showy ever, but he's always right on.

— Alan Parker
director of Mississippi Burning (1988)

Hackman alternated between leading and supporting roles during the 1980s. He appeared opposite Barbra Streisand in All Night Long (1981) and supported Warren Beatty in Reds (1981). He played the lead in Eureka (1983) and a supporting role in Under Fire (1983). Hackman provided the voice of God in Two of a Kind (1983) and starred in Uncommon Valor (1983), Misunderstood (1984), Twice in a Lifetime (1985), Target (1985) for Arthur Penn, and Power (1986). Between 1985 and 1988, he starred in nine films, making him the busiest actor, alongside Steve Guttenberg. Hackman played a high school basketball coach in Hoosiers (1986), which a 2008 American Film Institute poll named the fourth-greatest sports film of all time. After Superman IV: The Quest for Peace (1987), he also voiced Nuclear Man (who was portrayed by Mark Pillow) and was in No Way Out (1987), Split Decisions (1988), Bat*21 (1988), and Full Moon in Blue Water (1988).

Hackman acted opposite Gena Rowlands in the Woody Allen drama Another Woman (1988). Hackman starred in the Alan Parker-directed crime drama Mississippi Burning (1988), costarring Willem Dafoe, where they portrayed FBI agents investigating the murder of 3 civil rights student activists. He earned acclaim for the role, with Roger Ebert praising his performance for his subtlety. He was nominated for a second Academy Award for Best Actor, losing to Dustin Hoffman for Rain Man. After this he appeared in The Package (1989). Hackman starred in Loose Cannons (1990) with Dan Aykroyd, and he had a supporting role in Postcards from the Edge (1990). He appeared with Anne Archer in Narrow Margin (1990), a remake of the 1952 film The Narrow Margin. After Class Action (1991) and Company Business (1991), Hackman played the sadistic sheriff "Little Bill" Daggett in the Western Unforgiven, directed by Clint Eastwood and written by David Webb Peoples. Hackman had pledged to avoid violent roles, but Eastwood convinced him to take the part, which earned him a second Oscar, this time for Best Supporting Actor. The film also won Best Picture.

Hackman returned to Broadway, starring in the 1992 Ariel Dorfman play Death and the Maiden, acting opposite Glenn Close and Richard Dreyfus at the Brooks Atkinson Theater. In 1993, he appeared in Geronimo: An American Legend as Brigadier General George Crook and co-starred with Tom Cruise as a corrupt lawyer in The Firm, a legal thriller based on the John Grisham novel of the same name. Hackman would appear in two other films based on John Grisham novels, playing Sam Cayhall, a Klansman on death row, in The Chamber (1996), and jury consultant Rankin Fitch in Runaway Jury (2003). Other films Hackman appeared in during the 1990s include Wyatt Earp (1994) (as Nicholas Porter Earp, Wyatt Earp's father), The Quick and the Dead (1995) opposite Sharon Stone, Leonardo DiCaprio, and Russell Crowe, and as submarine Captain Frank Ramsey alongside Denzel Washington in Crimson Tide (1995).

Hackman played film producer Harry Zimm alongside John Travolta in the comedy-drama Get Shorty (1995). In 1996, he took a comedic turn as conservative Senator Kevin Keeley in The Birdcage with Robin Williams and Nathan Lane. He co-starred with Hugh Grant in Extreme Measures (1996) and reunited with Clint Eastwood in Absolute Power (1997). Hackman did Twilight (1998) with Paul Newman for director Robert Benton, voiced the villain in the DreamWorks' animated film Antz (1998), and co-starred with Will Smith in Enemy of the State (1998), his character reminiscent of the one he had portrayed in The Conversation, but with a comedic twist and a relaxed presence on screen.

=== 2000–2004: Final films and retirement ===
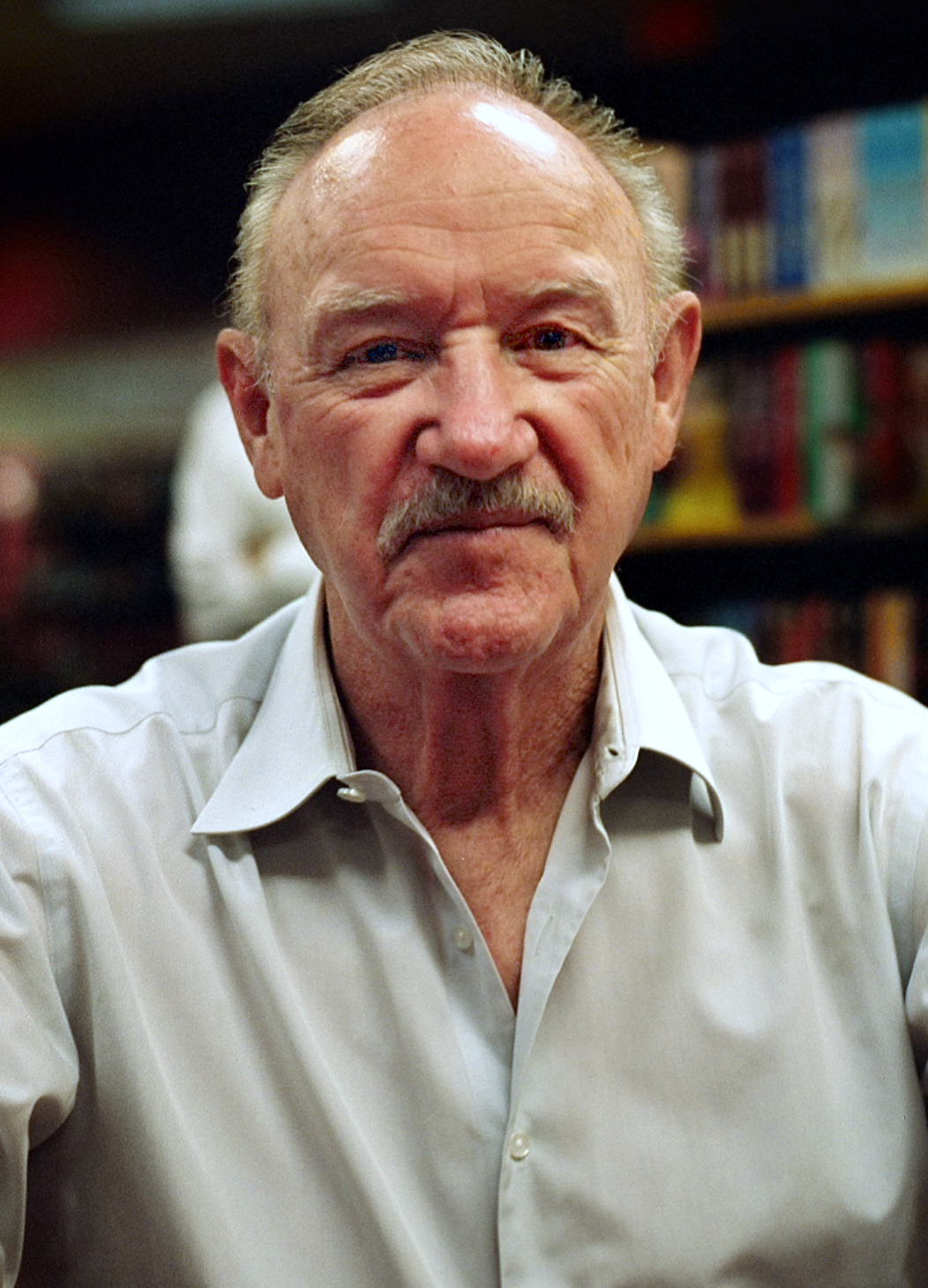
Hackman in 2008

Hackman co-starred with Morgan Freeman in Under Suspicion (2000), Keanu Reeves in The Replacements (2000), Owen Wilson in Behind Enemy Lines (2001), and Sigourney Weaver in Heartbreakers (2001) and appeared in the David Mamet crime thriller Heist (2001) as an aging professional thief of considerable skill who is forced into one final job. He made a cameo in The Mexican (2001). Hackman gained much critical acclaim playing against type as the head of an eccentric family in Wes Anderson's comedy film The Royal Tenenbaums (2001). Frank Scheck of The Hollywood Reporter wrote, "Hackman is utter perfection as the misbegotten paterfamilias, conveying beautifully Royal's underlying decency and love for his family as well as his con-man slickness." For his performance, he received the Golden Globe Award for Best Actor in a Motion Picture Musical or Comedy.

In 2003, he also starred in another John Grisham legal drama, Runaway Jury, at long last getting to make a picture with his long-time friend Dustin Hoffman. In 2004, Hackman appeared alongside Ray Romano in the comedy Welcome to Mooseport, his final film acting role. Hackman was honored with the Cecil B. DeMille Award from the Golden Globe Awards for his "outstanding contribution to the entertainment field" in 2003. Michael Caine and Robin Williams presented him with the award.

In July 2004, Hackman gave a rare interview to Larry King, where he announced that he had no future film projects lined up and believed his acting career was over. In 2008, while promoting his third novel, he confirmed that he had retired from acting. That year, Hackman made his last televised appearance in Diners, Drive-Ins, and Dives, as Guy Fieri went to a Santa Fe diner where Hackman was eating. Speaking on his retirement in 2009, Hackman said, "The straw that broke the camel's back was actually a stress test that I took in New York. The doctor advised me that my heart wasn't in the kind of shape that I should be putting it under any stress." When asked during a GQ magazine interview in 2011 if he would ever come out of retirement to do one more film, he said he might consider it "if I could do it in my own house, maybe, without them disturbing anything and just one or two people."

== Other work ==
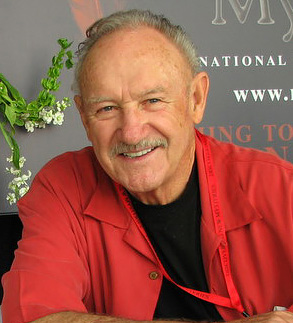
Hackman at a book signing in 2008

Together with undersea archaeologist Daniel Lenihan, Hackman wrote three historical fiction novels: Wake of the Perdido Star (1999), a sea adventure of the 19th century; Justice for None (2004), a Depression-era tale of murder based on a real-life crime in his boyhood town of Danville; and Escape from Andersonville (2008), about a prison escape during the American Civil War. His first solo effort, a story of love and revenge set in the Old West titled Payback at Morning Peak, was released in 2011. His final novel, Pursuit, a police thriller, followed in 2013.

After retiring from acting, Hackman narrated four episodes of the NFL Films sports documentary series America's Game: The Super Bowl Champions in 2007. He later narrated two documentaries related to the United States Marine Corps: The Unknown Flag Raiser of Iwo Jima (2016) and We, the Marines (2017).

== Personal life ==
=== Marriages and family ===
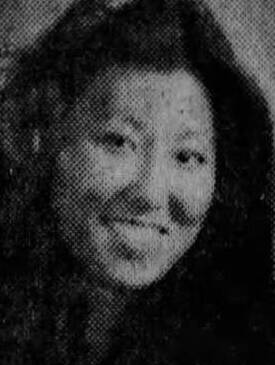
Hackman married classical pianist Betsy Arakawa in 1991.

In 1956, Hackman married Faye Maltese (1928–2017), with whom he had one son and two daughters: Christopher Allen, Elizabeth Jean, and Leslie Anne Hackman. He was often out on location making films while the children were growing up. The couple divorced in 1986, after three decades of marriage.

On December 1, 1991, Hackman married classical pianist Betsy Arakawa (1959–2025) after they had dated for seven years. They shared a Santa Fe, New Mexico, home, which Architectural Digest featured in 1990. At the time, the home blended Southwestern styles and was at the crest of a 12-acre hilltop, with a 360-degree view that stretched to the Jemez, Sangre de Cristo, and Sandia mountains.

=== Views and interests ===
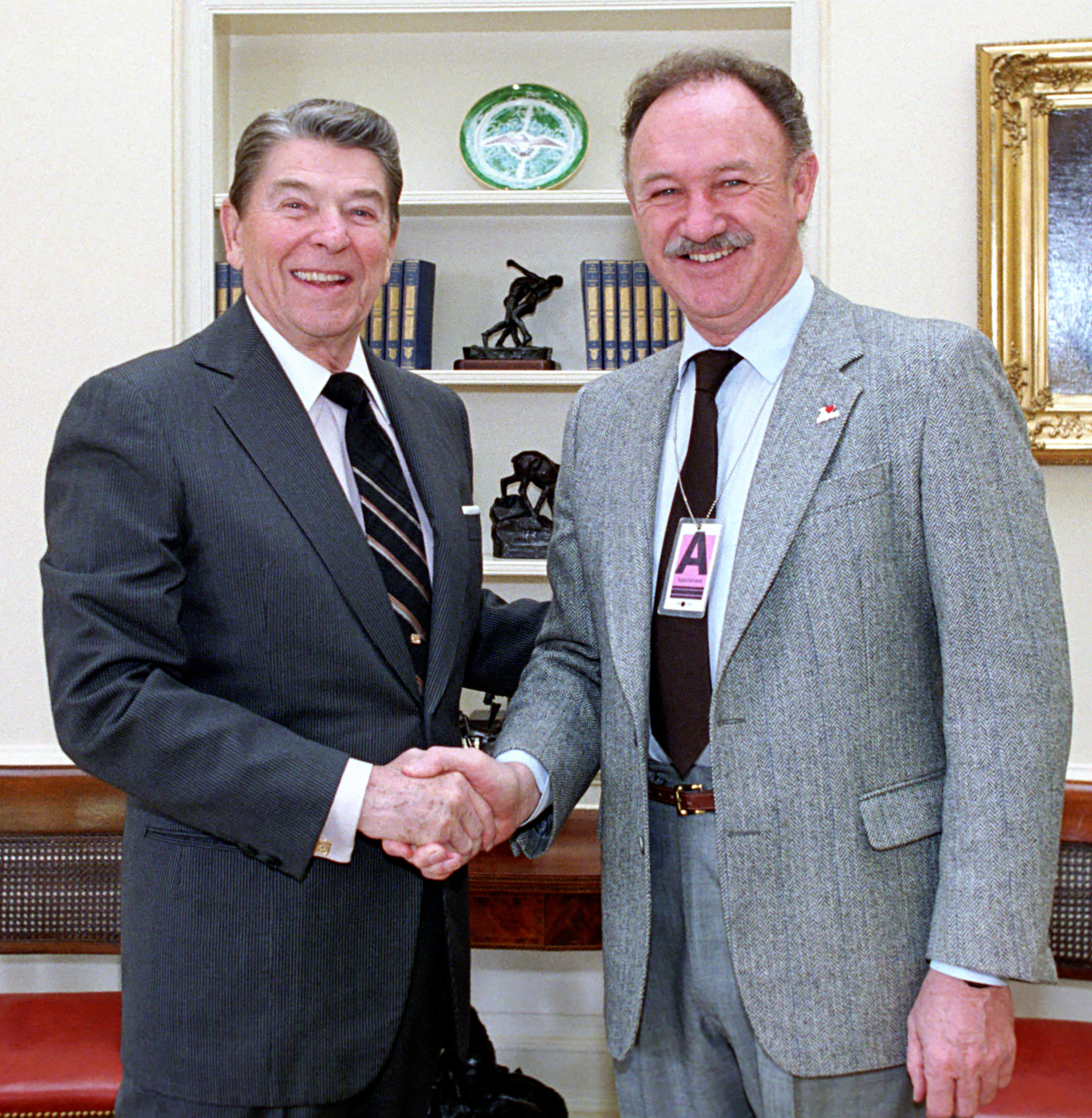
Hackman (right) with President Ronald Reagan in 1987

Hackman was a supporter of the Democratic Party and said he was "proud" to be included on Nixon's Enemies List. However, he spoke fondly about Republican president Ronald Reagan.

In the late 1970s, Hackman competed in Sports Car Club of America races, driving an open-wheeled Formula Ford. In 1980, he won the Long Beach Toyota Pro/Celebrity Race. He also drove a Dan Gurney Team Toyota in the 24 Hours of Daytona Endurance Race in 1983.

Hackman was a fan of the Jacksonville Jaguars, an NFL football team based in Jacksonville, Florida, and regularly attended Jaguars games as a guest of former head coach Jack Del Rio. Their friendship went back to Del Rio's playing days at the University of Southern California.

Hackman was also interested in architecture and design. As of 1990, he had created ten homes, two of which were featured in Architectural Digest. After a period of time, he moved on to another house restoration. "I don't know what's wrong with me," he remarked. "I guess I like the process, and when it's over, it's over." Hackman was an active cyclist well into his 90s.

=== Health ===
In 1990, Hackman underwent an angioplasty. In 2012, Hackman was struck by a pickup truck while he was cycling in the Florida Keys. It was initially reported that he had suffered serious head trauma; however, his publicist stated that his injury was nothing more than "bumps and bruises". Hackman attended an event in Santa Fe in late 2022. He was last seen in public in March 2024. After his death, autopsy reports revealed Hackman had Alzheimer's disease, which contributed to his death.

== Death ==
In the final months of his life, Hackman's neighbors in Santa Fe, New Mexico, noticed that his health appeared to be declining, and he ceased communicating with family and friends, although any health concerns were denied by his daughter, Leslie Ann. Betsy Arakawa, Hackman's wife and sole caregiver, was last seen alive at a CVS Pharmacy on February 11, 2025, and returned to their gated community at 5:15 p.m. On February 12, Arakawa telephoned a private physician and made an appointment for that afternoon, complaining of respiratory problems, but did not arrive for the appointment. Arakawa died in their home a short time later from hantavirus pulmonary syndrome; she was 65 years old. Hackman did not seek help; authorities believe he was unable to comprehend her death due to Alzheimer's disease. Hackman died in the home around February 18, at which point his pacemaker recorded an abnormal rhythm. He died from severe heart disease, complicated by advanced Alzheimer's disease and kidney disease, at the age of 95.

On February 26, two maintenance and security workers found Hackman dead in the house's mudroom. Arakawa's body was found in a separate room on the floor of a bathroom next to a space heater, along with an open prescription bottle with pills scattered on the countertop. Their dog, an Australian kelpie mix named Zinfandel (nicknamed Zinna) was found dead inside a crate in a bathroom closet, about 10 to 15 feet from Arakawa's body, which led investigators to determine that she likely died from dehydration and starvation. The 12-year-old dog had recently undergone major surgery involving her small intestine and spleen removal, and veterinary instructions required keeping her crated. Their other two dogs were found alive in the home. Although foul play was not suspected, the deaths were deemed suspicious enough to warrant an investigation.

Hackman's estate requested that the courts block images and videos related to the investigation, such as police body camera footage. Arakawa's will stated that if they were to die within 90 days of each other, the proceeds would go to charity; Hackman's will, created in 1995, listed Arakawa as his sole inheritor. The Mercury News reported that Hackman's children were not listed in the will because they had already been "adequately provided for" in financial trusts. In October 2025, it was announced that Bonhams would auction off Hackman's personal belongings, including his art collection, personal artworks, scripts, film memorabilia, and three of his Golden Globe Awards.

=== Tributes and legacy ===
Numerous members of the film industry paid tribute to Hackman following his death. Clint Eastwood, who directed Hackman in the films Unforgiven (1992) and Absolute Power (1997), wrote in a statement: "There was no finer actor than Gene. Intense and instinctive. Never a false note. He was also a dear friend whom I will miss very much." Francis Ford Coppola, who directed him in The Conversation (1974), wrote: "Gene Hackman [was] a great actor, inspiring and magnificent in his work and complexity. I mourn his loss, and celebrate his existence and contribution."

Morgan Freeman paid tribute to Hackman at the 97th Academy Awards, saying, "Like everyone who ever shared a scene with him, I learned he was a generous performer whose gifts elevated everyone's work" and that he would be "remembered [as someone who did good work] and so much more." Others who paid tribute included Dustin Hoffman, Glenn Close, Tom Hanks, Viola Davis, Bill Murray, Mel Brooks, Alec Baldwin, Gwyneth Paltrow, Barbra Streisand, Nathan Lane, Josh Brolin, John Cusack, Ben Stiller, Antonio Banderas, Hank Azaria, George Takei, and Jennifer Love Hewitt. The Guardian film critic Peter Bradshaw wrote that Hackman's death marked the end of American new wave cinema. He described Hackman as "really a star; in fact the star of every scene he was in – that tough, wised-up, intelligent, but unhandsome face perpetually on the verge of coolly unconcerned derision, or creased in a heartbreakingly fatherly, pained smile."

== Selected filmography ==
- Mad Dog Coll (1961)
- Lilith (1964)
- Hawaii (1966)
- Bonnie and Clyde (1967)
- Downhill Racer (1969)
- Marooned (1969)
- I Never Sang for My Father (1970)
- The French Connection (1971)
- The Hunting Party (1971)
- Cisco Pike (1971)
- The Poseidon Adventure (1972)
- Prime Cut (1972)
- Scarecrow (1973)
- The Conversation (1974)
- Young Frankenstein (1974)
- Night Moves (1975)
- A Bridge Too Far (1977)
- Superman (1978)
- Superman II (1980)
- Reds (1981)
- Eureka (1983)
- Uncommon Valor (1983)
- Under Fire (1983)
- Twice in a Lifetime (1985)
- Hoosiers (1986)
- Power (1986)
- Superman IV: The Quest for Peace (1987)
- No Way Out (1987)
- Another Woman (1988)
- Mississippi Burning (1988)
- The Package (1989)
- Narrow Margin (1990)
- Postcards from the Edge (1990)
- Class Action (1991)
- Unforgiven (1992)
- The Firm (1993)
- Wyatt Earp (1994)
- Crimson Tide (1995)
- Get Shorty (1995)
- The Quick and the Dead (1995)
- The Birdcage (1996)
- Absolute Power (1997)
- Antz (1998)
- Enemy of the State (1998)
- The Replacements (2000)
- Heist (2001)
- Behind Enemy Lines (2001)
- Heartbreakers (2001)
- The Mexican (2001)
- The Royal Tenenbaums (2001)
- Runaway Jury (2003)
- Welcome to Mooseport (2004)

== Awards and nominations ==
Hackman received two Academy Awards, an Actor Award, two British Academy Film Awards, four Golden Globe Awards. He was recognized by the Academy of Motion Picture Arts and Sciences for the following performances:

- 40th Academy Awards (1967): Best Supporting Actor, nomination, Bonnie & Clyde
- 43th Academy Awards (1970): Best Supporting Actor, nomination, I Never Sang for My Father
- 44th Academy Awards (1971): Best Actor, win, The French Connection
- 61st Academy Awards (1988): Best Actor, nomination, Mississippi Burning
- 65th Academy Awards (1992): Best Supporting Actor, win, Unforgiven

Asteroid 55397 Hackman, discovered by Roy Tucker in 2001, was named in his honor. The official naming citation was published by the Minor Planet Center on May 18, 2019 (M.P.C. 114954).

== Publications ==
- Hackman, Gene, and Daniel Lenihan (1999). Wake of the Perdido Star. New York: Newmarket Press. ISBN 978-1-557-04398-6. OCLC 42027535.
- Hackman, Gene, and Daniel Lenihan (2004). Justice for None. New York: St. Martin's Press. ISBN 978-0-312-32425-4. OCLC 54035033.
- Hackman, Gene, and Daniel Lenihan (2008). Escape from Andersonville: A Novel of the Civil War. New York: St. Martin's Press. ISBN 978-0-312-36373-4. OCLC 191865890.
- Hackman, Gene (2011). Payback at Morning Peak: A Novel of the American West. New York: Simon & Schuster. ISBN 978-1-451-62356-7. OCLC 798634411.
- Hackman, Gene (2013). Pursuit. New York: Pocket Books. ISBN 978-1-451-62357-4. OCLC 857568111.

== See also ==
- List of actors who have appeared in multiple Palme d'Or winners
