= Harris Yulin =

American actor (1937–2025)

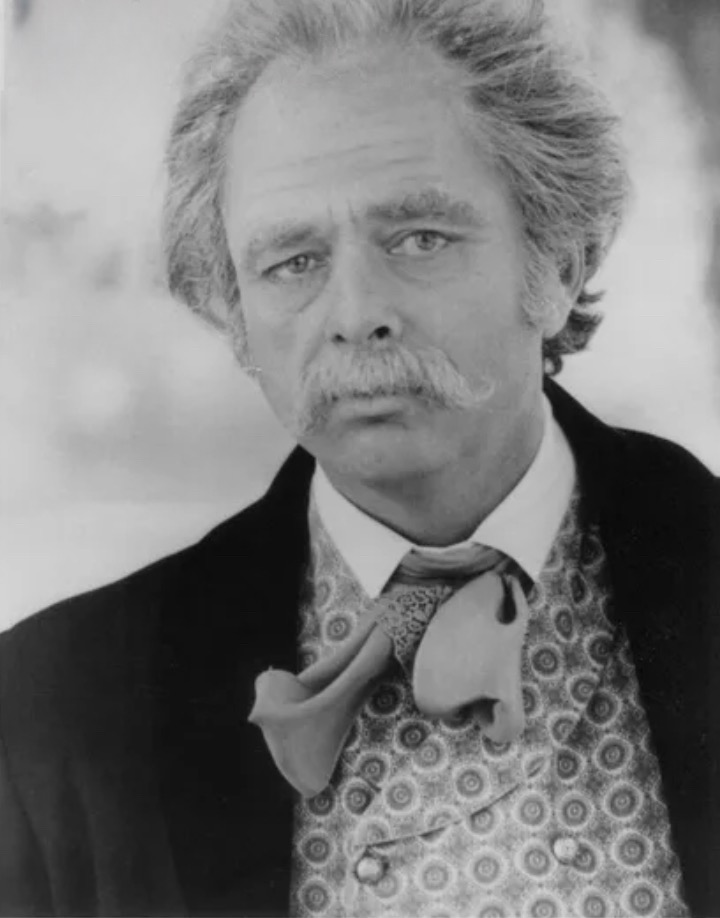
- Yulin in Dynasty (1976)
- Born: November 5, 1937; Los Angeles, California, U.S.
- Died: June 10, 2025 (aged 87); New York City, U.S.
- Occupation: Actor
- Years active: 1963–2025
- Spouses: Gwen Welles (m. 1975; died 1993) Kristen Lowman (m. 2005)
- Children: 1

Harris Bart Goldberg (November 5, 1937 – June 10, 2025), known professionally as Harris Yulin, was an American actor who appeared in over a hundred film and television series roles including Night Moves (1975), St. Ives (1976), Scarface (1983), Ghostbusters II (1989), Clear and Present Danger (1994), Looking for Richard (1996), Bean (1997), The Hurricane (1999), Training Day (2001), Ozark (2017–2018) and Frasier, which earned him a Primetime Emmy Award nomination in 1996.

== Early life and education ==
Yulin was born in Los Angeles on November 5, 1937. Abandoned at an orphanage as an infant, he was adopted by dentist Isaac Goldberg and his wife Sylvia when he was four months old, and given the name Harris Bart Goldberg. When he began a performing career, he took the stage surname "Yulin" from his adoptive father's extended Russian Jewish family.

Yulin attended the University of Southern California, but did not graduate. He enlisted in the United States Army for a year and then moved to Florence, Italy, where he tried working as a painter, saying in 2000 he was "extremely bad at it." In 1962, he was living in Tel Aviv, Israel when his friends encouraged him to try acting and he began appearing in small shows. When he returned to the United States, he met acting coach Jeff Corey with connections from his father's dental career and began studying acting.

== Career ==
=== Acting ===
Yulin made his New York debut in 1963 in Next Time I'll Sing to You by James Saunders and continued to work frequently in theater throughout his career. His Broadway debut came in the 1980s Watch on the Rhine. He returned to Broadway multiple times in productions of The Visit, The Diary of Anne Frank, The Price, and Hedda Gabler. In 2010, he played Willy Loman in Death of A Salesman at the Gate Theatre in Dublin, Ireland.

His first film role was his portrayal of Wyatt Earp in Doc (1971), starring Stacy Keach as Doc Holliday. He appeared in the Brian De Palma film Scarface (1983) as corrupt cop Mel Bernstein. In 1989, he played the role of Judge Stephen Wexler in Ghostbusters II. He portrayed a corrupt national security advisor in the 1994 Harrison Ford thriller Clear and Present Danger. In 1997, he played the role of George Grierson in Bean. He appeared as Leon Friedman, a lawyer of Rubin Carter, in the 1999 film, The Hurricane. In 2001, he portrayed Secret Service Agent Sterling in Rush Hour 2.

Film critic Jim Emerson once quipped that Yulin "should be in every movie ever made".

On television, Yulin appeared in Star Trek: Deep Space Nine in the episode "Duet". During the second season of the television series 24, he played the Director of the National Security Agency, Roger Stanton. He was nominated for a 1996 Emmy Award for his portrayal of crime boss Jerome Belasco in the sitcom Frasier. In the series Buffy the Vampire Slayer, he played Quentin Travers, head of the Watchers' Council. Yulin also appeared in Season 3 of Entourage in the episode "Return of the King" as studio head Arthur Gadoff. In 2009, he performed in The People Speak, a documentary feature film that uses dramatic and musical performances of the letters, diaries, and speeches of everyday Americans, based on historian Howard Zinn's A People's History of the United States. In 2010 he appeared in the AMC series Rubicon. In 2017 to 2018 he appeared in 12 episodes of Ozark.

At the time of his death, Yulin had been cast in the MGM+ comedy series American Classic in the role of Linus; he died days before he was scheduled to begin filming his scenes.

=== Beyond acting ===
Yulin won the Lucille Lortel Award for directing The Trip to Bountiful at the Signature Theatre in New York with Lois Smith. He directed and taught in New York City: at Juilliard for eight years; at Columbia University's The Graduate School of the Arts; and at HB Studio.

== Personal life and death ==
Yulin dated Faye Dunaway from 1971 to 1972. He and actress Gwen Welles were married until her death in 1993. Yulin's daughter, Claire Lucido, was the wife of artist Ted Mineo. Lucido died January 31, 2021.

His second marriage was to Kristen Lowman, an actress; they lived in Bridgehampton, New York. Yulin died from cardiac arrest in New York City, on June 10, 2025 at 87.

== Filmography ==
=== Film ===
Film appearances of Harris Yulin
Year	Title	Role	Notes
1970	Maidstone		
1970	End of the Road	Joe Morgan	
1971	Doc	Wyatt Earp	
1972	The Legend of Hillbilly John	Zebulon Yandro	
1974	The Midnight Man	Casey	
1974	Watched!	Gordon Rankey	
1975	Night Moves	Marty Heller	
1976	St. Ives	Detective Carl Oller	
1977	Prime Time a.k.a. American Raspberry	Charles Conlin	
1979	Steel	Eddie Cassidy	
1983	Scarface	Chief Detective Mel Bernstein	
1986	Short Fuse	Chief Harrigan	
1987	Candy Mountain	Elmore Silk	
1987	The Believers	Robert Calder	
1987	Fatal Beauty	Conrad Kroll	
1988	Bad Dreams	Dr. Berrisford	
1988	Judgment in Berlin	Bruno Ristau	
1988	Another Woman	Paul	
1989	Ghostbusters II	Judge Stephen Wexler	
1990	Narrow Margin	Leo Watts	
1992	Final Analysis	Prosecuting Attorney	Uncredited
1992	There Goes the Neighborhood	Marvin Goes	
1994	Clear and Present Danger	James Cutter	
1995	Stuart Saves His Family	Dad	
1995	The Baby-Sitters Club	Harold	
1995	Cutthroat Island	Black Harry	
1996	Looking for Richard	Himself / King Edward	Documentary
1996	Loch Ness	Dr. Bob Mercer	
1996	Multiplicity	Dr. Leeds	
1997	Murder at 1600	General Clark Tully	
1997	Bean	George Grierson	
1999	Cradle Will Rock	Chairman Martin Dies	
1999	The Hurricane	Leon Friendman	
2000	The Million Dollar Hotel	Stanley Goldkiss	
2000	75 Degrees in July	Rick Anderson	
2001	Perfume	Phillip	
2001	Rush Hour 2	Agent Sterling	
2001	American Outlaws	Thaddeus Rains	
2001	Training Day	Detective Doug Roselli	
2001	Chelsea Walls	Bud's Editor	
2001	The Emperor's Club	Senator Bell	
2004	King of the Corner	Peter Hargrove	
2005	Game 6	Peter Redmond	
2006	The Treatment	Dr. Arnold Singer	
2006	Fur: An Imaginary Portrait of Diane Arbus	David Nemerov	
2009	The People Speak	Himself	
2010	My Soul to Take	Dr. Blake	
2012	The Place Beyond the Pines	Judge Albert Cross	
2014	A Short History of Decay	Bob Fisher	
2015	The Family Fang	Hobart Waxman	
2016	The American Side	Tom Soberin	
2016	Norman	Joe Wilf	
2017	The Sounding	Lionel	
2018	All Square	Bob	
2018	Wanderland	Charles	
2024	Omni Loop	Professor Duselberg	

=== Television ===
Television appearances of Harris Yulin
Year	Title	Role	Notes
1970	Neither Are We Enemies	Barabbas	Television film
1973	Incident at Vichy	Doctor Leduc	Television film
1973	The ABC Afternoon Playbreak	John Connors	Episode: "The Mask of Love"
1974	The American Short Story	Parker Adderson	Episode: "Parker Adderson, Philosopher"
1974	Kojak	Bert Podis	Episode: "Die Before They Wake"
1974	Barnaby Jones	Porter Long	Episode: "Conspiracy of Terror"
1974	Melvin Purvis: G-Man	George "Machine Gun" Kelly	Television film
1974	The Greatest Gift	Hog Yancy	Television film
1974	The Missiles of October	Alexander Fomin	Television film
1975	Ironside	Sam North	Episode: "A Matter of Life of Death"
1975	The Trial of Chaplain Jensen	Lieutenant Kastner	Television film
1975	Little House on the Prairie	John Stewart	Episode: "Child of Pain"
1975	Caribe	Peter Brady	Episode: "The Assassin"
1975	Baretta	Detective Grissom	Episode: "The Glory Game"
1975	The Kansas City Massacre	John Lazia	Television film
1975	S.W.A.T.	Paul Julian	Episode: "Vigilante"
1975	Police Woman	Benny Hummel	Episode: "The Hit"
1976	Dynasty	John Blackwood	Television film
1976	Insight	Bradley Knight	Episode: "His Feet Don't Stink"
1976	Most Wanted	Billy Wilcox	Episode: "The Skykiller"
1976	Victory at Entebbe	General Dan Shomron	Television film
1977	Wonder Woman	Mark Bremer	Episode: "Wonder Woman in Hollywood"
1978	When Every Day Was the Fourth of July	Prosecutor Joseph T. Antonelli	Television film
1978–1979	How the West Was Won	Deek Peasley	6 episodes
1979	The Thirteenth Day: The Story of Esther	Haman	Television film
1979–1981	Meeting of Minds	Leonardo da Vinci/William Shakespeare	4 episodes
1984–1985	As the World Turns	Michael Christopher	
1985	Robert Kennedy and His Times	Senator Joseph McCarthy	Episode: "#1.1"
1986	Cagney & Lacey	Ross O'Brien	Episode: "Revenge"
1989	Tailspin: Behind the Korean Airliner Tragedy	Gen. Tyson	Television film
1990	Daughter of the Streets	John Franco	Television film
1990–1991	WIOU	Neal Frazier	16 episodes
1991	Face of a Strangers	David	Television film
1992	The Heart of Justice	Keneally	Television film
1992	Civil Wars	Nicolo Nicolai	Episode: "Dan Boat House"
1993	The Last Hit	Wilbur Bryant	Television film
1993	Star Trek: Deep Space Nine	Aamin Marritza	Episode: "Duet"
1994, 2008	Law & Order	Stanley Devon / Edward Manning	Episode S4:E16: "Big Bang" Episode S19:E2: "Challenged"
1995	Truman	General George C. Marshall	Television film
1996	Frasier	Jerome Belasco	Episode: "A Word to the Wiseguy"
1996	If These Walls Could Talk	Professor Speras	Segment "1974"
1997	Murphy Brown	The Jackal	Episode: "You Don't Know Jackal"
1997	La Femme Nikita	Gregory Kessler / Norris Gaines	Episode: "Gambit"
1997	Hostile Waters	Admiral Quinn	Television film
1997–2001	American Experience	Narrator	Documentary; 2 episodes
1998	American Masters	Narrator	Episode: "Leonard Bernstein: Reaching for the Note"
1999	Vengeance Unlimited	Judge Harold Wabash	Episode: "Judgment"
1999–2002	Buffy the Vampire Slayer	Quentin Travers	3 episodes
2000	The Virginian	Judge Henry	Television film
2000	The X-Files	Cardinal O'Fallon	Episode: "Hollywood A.D."
2002–2003	24	Roger Stanton	9 episodes
2003	Mister Sterling	Chairman Wilson	3 episodes
2005	Third Watch	Jonathan Turner	2 episodes
2007	Law & Order: Criminal Intent	Thomas M. Grady Sr.	Episode: "Players"
2007	Entourage	Arthur Gatoff	Episode: "The Return of the King"
2008	Cashmere Mafia	Rafe Gropman	2 episodes
2008	Canterbury's Law	Chris Canterbury	Episode: "Trade-Off"
2009	Loving Leah	Rabbi Belsky	Television film
2009	Damages	Claire's father	Episode: "Uh Oh, Out Come the Skeletons"
2010	Rubicon	Tom Rhumor	2 episodes
2010	Madso's War	Jim O'Connor	Television film
2011	Pan Am	Henry Belsen	Episode: "Unscheduled Departure"
2011–2012	Nikita	Admiral Bruce Winnick	3 episodes
2013	Muhammad Ali's Greatest Fight	William O. Douglas	Television film
2015	Forever	Eli Swier	Episode: "Hitler on the Half-Shell"
2015	The Blacklist	Sir Crispin Crandall	1 episode
2016	Veep	James Whitman	2 episodes
2016–2017	Unbreakable Kimmy Schmidt	Orson Snyder	5 episodes
2017–2018	Ozark	Buddy Dieker	12 episodes
2018–2019	Billions	Leonard Funt	3 episodes
2018	Murphy Brown	Professor Talbot	2 episodes
2019	For the People	Peter Daum	Episode: "Minimum Continuing Legal Education"
2019	Divorce	Gordon	4 episodes
2020	I Know This Much Is True	Father LaVie	1 episode
2022	FBI: Most Wanted	Grant Moore	Episode: "Karma"
2025	And Just Like That...	Pop Pop	Episode: "Apples to Apples"
