= Prime Cut =

1972 film by Michael Ritchie

- Theatrical release poster by Tom Jung
- Directed by: Michael Ritchie
- Written by: Robert Dillon
- Produced by: Joe Wizan
- Starring: Lee Marvin; Gene Hackman; Gregory Walcott; Angel Tompkins
- Cinematography: Gene Polito
- Edited by: Carl Pingitore
- Music by: Lalo Schifrin
- Production company: Cinema Center Films
- Distributed by: National General Pictures
- Release date: June 28, 1972
- Running time: 88 minutes
- Country: United States
- Language: English
- Budget: $3,500,000
- Box office: $1,500,000 (US/Canada theatrical rentals)

Prime Cut is a 1972 American action thriller crime film produced by Joe Wizan, directed by Michael Ritchie from a screenplay written by Robert Dillon, and starring Lee Marvin as Nick Devlin, a mob enforcer from the Chicago Irish Mob sent to Kansas to collect a debt from a meatpacker boss played by Gene Hackman. The picture co-stars Sissy Spacek in her first credited on-screen role as Poppy, a young orphan being sold into prostitution as well as Angel Tompkins and Eddie Egan.

The film was considered highly risqué for its time based on its violence and the hint of a homosexual relationship between two brothers. Its graphic depiction of female slavery includes a scene depicting naked young women (including Sissy Spacek and Janit Baldwin) in pens being auctioned like cattle. It is also noted for its depiction of the beef slaughtering process and for a chase scene involving a combine harvester in an open field.

== Plot ==
A slaughterhouse process follows the unloading of cattle to the making of sausages. A wristwatch and a shoe appear on a conveyor line, making it clear that a human cadaver is processed among the cattle. A woman operating the sausage machine is interrupted by "Weenie", who has timed the machine using his watch. He wraps up a string of sausages, then marks the package with an address in Chicago.

Weenie is the brother of "Mary Ann", the crooked operator of the slaughterhouse in Kansas City, Kansas. The particular sausages that Weenie was wrapping were made from the remains of an enforcer from the Chicago Irish Mob sent to Kansas City to collect $500,000 from Mary Ann.

After the head of the Irish Mob in Chicago receives the package, he contacts Nick Devlin, a WWII veteran and enforcer with whom he has worked previously, to go to Kansas City to collect the debt. He tells Devlin about the sausages and that another enforcer sent to Kansas City was found floating in the Missouri River.

Devlin agrees to the fee of $50,000 and asks for some additional muscle. He gets a driver, Shay, and three other younger members of the Irish Mob as help, including the young O'Brien, who makes Devlin meet his mother as he leaves Chicago. It is later revealed that Devlin and Mary Ann have a shared history involving Mary Ann's wife Clarabelle, who previously had an affair with Devlin. In Kansas City at a flophouse, Devlin finds Weenie in an upstairs room. He beats him up and tells him to inform Mary Ann that he is in town to collect the debt.

The next day, Devlin and his men drive to the prairie and find Mary Ann in a barn, where he is entertaining guests at a white slave (prostitute) auction. Devlin demands the money from Mary Ann, who tells him to come to the county fair the next day to get it and states that Chicago is "an old sow, begging for cream" that should be melted down.

As they are standing by a cattle pen with naked young women offered for auction, one of them, Poppy, begs Devlin for help. Devlin takes her with him "on account." Back at the hotel, she tells Devlin her history of growing up at an orphanage in Missouri with her close friend, Violet, before they were brought to the slave auction.

At the county fair, in the midst of a livestock judging competition, Mary Ann gives Devlin a box that supposedly contains the money. When Devlin cracks the box open, he finds it contains only beef hearts. Devlin is able to escape with Poppy after Violet distracts Weenie, who claimed her after the auction. Mary Ann's men chase Devlin, his men and Poppy through the fair. O'Brien is killed underneath a viewing stand for a shooting range. Devlin and Poppy run into a nearby wheat field, where they escape detection. When they try to leave the field, they are chased by a combine harvester operator until Devlin's men arrive in their car, which they ram into the front of the combine, and shoot the operator.

With the car demolished, the group hitches a ride back into Kansas City on a truck. Devlin jumps off near the river and sends the rest of them with Poppy back into town. He enters a houseboat, the luxurious accommodation of Clarabelle, purchased for her by Mary Ann; she is there alone. He gets information on the whereabouts of Mary Ann while surmising that she was the one pushing Mary Ann to cut out Chicago. Clarabelle attempts to seduce him, but he rebuffs her. Clarabelle tells him she would be perfectly happy being a widow and joining Devlin again. He responds by setting the houseboat adrift on the river, with an angry Clarabelle aboard.

When he returns to the hotel, Devlin finds an ambulance taking Delaney, one of his men, away. He learns that Mary Ann's men ambushed them and took Poppy. When he returns to Weenie's hotel to look for him, he finds that Violet has been gang-raped, apparently as a warning of what will happen to Poppy.

Devlin and his two remaining men, Shay and Shaughnessy, drive out to Mary Ann's farm to finally take care of business. They approach the farm through a sunflower field and engage in a gun battle with Mary Ann's men. Both of Devlin's men are hit, and he tells them to stay behind while he advances with a submachine gun. Unable to get past Mary Ann's men, he commandeers a truck hauling livestock and uses it to ram the gate and smash into the greenhouse on the farm, demolishing it.

Devlin kills several of Mary Ann's men, then advances into the barn where Mary Ann and Weenie are holding Poppy. He hits Mary Ann, who falls down into a pig pen. Enraged at seeing his brother shot, Weenie runs toward Devlin, who kills him; Weenie tries to stab Devlin with a sausage until he dies. As Devlin and Poppy leave the barn, they pass the mortally wounded Mary Ann, who taunts Devlin to finish him off like he would an animal. Devlin refuses and walks away, leaving Mary Ann to die on his back.

In the final scene, Devlin and Poppy go back to the Missouri orphanage and demand the release of the rest of the girls. When the matron resists, Poppy knocks her out, to the approval of Devlin. As they walk away, Devlin tells her they're going back to Chicago, and when Poppy asks what it's like, he replies it's "as peaceful as anyplace anywhere".

== Cast ==
- Lee Marvin as Nick Devlin
- Gene Hackman as Mary Ann
- Angel Tompkins as Clarabelle
- Gregory Walcott as Weenie
- Sissy Spacek as Poppy
- Janit Baldwin as Violet
- William Morey as Shay
- Clint Ellison as Delaney
- Howard Platt as Shaughnessy
- Hugh Gillin as Hotel Desk Clerk
- Les Lannom as O'Brien
- Eddie Egan as Jake
- Therese Reinsch as Jake's Girl
- Bob Wilson as Reaper Driver
- Gordon Signer as Brockman
- Gladys Watson as Milk Lady
- Wayne Savagne as Freckle Face

== Production ==
Finance came from Cinema Center Films.

== Reception ==
On the review aggregator website Rotten Tomatoes, 71% of 14 critics' reviews are positive. Roger Ebert gave a mostly positive review to Prime Cut, rating the film 3 stars out of a possible 4. He wrote, "Prime Cut is very different from the usual gangster movie; it's put together almost like a comic strip, with all of the good and bad things that implies..."

== See also ==
- List of American films of 1972
