= Power (1986 film) =

1986 American drama film directed by Sidney Lumet

- Theatrical release poster
- Directed by: Sidney Lumet
- Written by: David Himmelstein
- Produced by: Reene Schisgal; Mark Tarlov; Kenneth Utt; Wolfgang Glattes
- Starring: Richard Gere; Julie Christie; Gene Hackman; Kate Capshaw; Denzel Washington; E.G. Marshall; Beatrice Straight
- Cinematography: Andrzej Bartkowiak
- Edited by: Andrew Mondshein
- Music by: Cy Coleman
- Production company: Lorimar Productions
- Distributed by: 20th Century Fox
- Release dates: January 19, 1986 (United States Film Festival); January 31, 1986 (United States)
- Running time: 111 minutes
- Language: English
- Budget: $14 million
- Box office: $3,800,000

Power is a 1986 American thriller political drama film directed by Sidney Lumet and starring Richard Gere. The original screenplay by David Himmelstein focuses on political corruption and how power affects both those who wield it and the people they try to control.

Denzel Washington's performance in the film as public relations expert Arnold Billings earned him the 1987 NAACP Image Award for Outstanding Supporting Actor in a Motion Picture. Beatrice Straight's performance as Claire Hastings earned her a nomination for the Golden Raspberry Award for Worst Supporting Actress at the 7th Golden Raspberry Awards.

== Plot ==
Pete St. John, a ruthless and highly successful media consultant, is juggling a couple of political candidates when he is asked to join the campaign of wealthy but little-known businessman Jerome Cade, who hopes to win the Senate seat being vacated by St. John's friend Sam Hastings.

St. John comes into conflict with Arnold Billings, a public relations expert whose firm Cade has hired. St. John's investigation into Cade's background prompts Billings to retaliate by bugging St. John's office phones, flooding the basement of his headquarters, tampering with his private jet and interfering with his other clients.

These actions force St. John to examine himself and what he has become and to decide whether his ex-wife Ellen Freeman and his former partner Wilfred Buckley are right in believing that his success is due primarily to the exploitation of others.

== Cast ==
- Richard Gere as Pete St. John
- Julie Christie as Ellen Freeman
- Gene Hackman as Wilfred Buckley
- Kate Capshaw as Sydney Betterman
- Denzel Washington as Arnold Billings
- E. G. Marshall as Senator Sam Hastings
- Beatrice Straight as Claire Hastings
- Fritz Weaver as Wallace Furman
- Kevin Hagen as Cop
- Michael Learned as Governor Andrea Stannard
- J. T. Walsh as Jerome Cade
- Matt Salinger as Phillip Aarons
- Margaret Barker as Wealthy Matron

== Production ==
David Himmelstein, a former political journalist from the East Coast turned screenwriter, drew inspiration for his screenplay by observing political television ads. With a background of fifteen years covering political campaigns, he conducted thorough research by consulting various prominent media strategists.

Burt Reynolds was initially cast as Pete St. John but had to undergo dental surgery after experiencing nausea and dizziness from a previously fractured jaw, aggravated during a fight scene in City Heat (1984). Although it was anticipated that Reynolds would recover in time for filming, he advised director Sidney Lumet to have a backup plan just in case. The role went to Richard Gere.

Principal photography commenced on April 1, 1985, at Stage G in Kaufman Astoria Studios in Astoria, Queens, with plans for additional shooting at Modern Telecommunications Inc.'s uptown television studio in late April. To capture a pivotal moment where St. John urges political candidate Phillip Aaarons (Matt Salinger) to speak authentically, filmmakers utilized a makeup room. Studio 1 was utilized for filming the televised debate scenes, while location shooting occurred in Pittsburgh, Philadelphia, Santa Fe, New Mexico, and Seattle, Washington. Sheraton Hotel venues served as filming locations for interior scenes, including the office of Jerome Cade (J. T. Walsh) and a bar where Pete St. John meets Ellen Freeman (Julie Christie).

== Release ==
The film opened the United States Film Festival on January 19, 1986, at the Egyptian Theatre, Park City. 84 minutes into the premiere, the screening stopped as it was realized that the reels had been shown out of order. The audience were invited to stay and watch the rest of the film or return for a later screening.

== Critical reception ==
Vincent Canby of The New York Times, described the film as "a well-meaning, witless, insufferably smug movie that ... suffers from the total lack of a comic imagination."

Roger Ebert of Chicago Sun-Times, gave it a positive but qualified review and wrote, "Because these relationships are so well-written and acted, and because Power seems based on a wealth of research about the world of campaign professionals, the movie builds up considerable momentum during its first hour. There's a sense of excitement, of identification with this man who is being driven by his own energy, ambition and cynicism ... During the second half of the movie, however, a growing disappointment sets in. Power is too episodic. It doesn't really declare itself to be about any particular story, any single clear-cut issue ... The climax is a pointless, frustrating montage of images. It's a good montage, but it belongs somewhere in the middle of the movie; it states the problem, but not the solution or even the lack of a solution. The movie seems to be asking us to walk out of the theater shaking our heads in disillusionment, but I was more puzzled than disillusioned ... It's smart, it's knowledgeable, sometimes it's funny, occasionally it is very touching, and I learned something from it. That is almost enough, I suppose; it's more than most movies provide."

On Rotten Tomatoes, it has 50% score based on 12 reviews. On Metacritic it has a 50% score, indicating "mixed or average reviews".

== See also ==
- List of American films of 1986
