= Louis Auriacombe =

French conductor

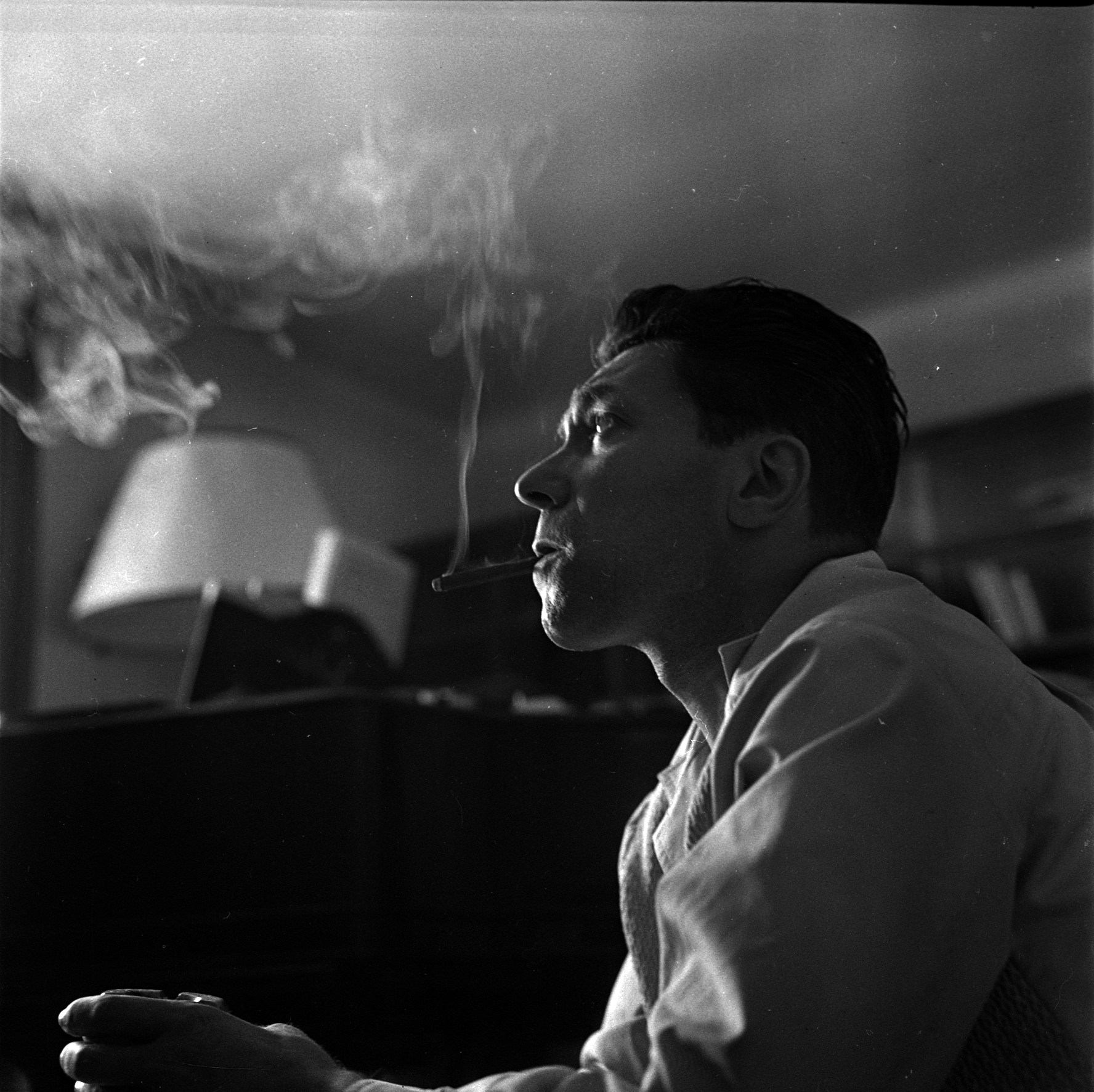
Louis Auriacombe in 1961

Louis Auriacombe (22 February 1917 – 12 March 1982) was a French conductor, active from 1956 to 1971.

== Career ==
Born in Pau, Auriacombe studied music at the Conservatoire de Toulouse where he won the prizes for violin (1931), singing and declamation (1937), and harmony (1939). He then studied conducting with Igor Markevitch in Salzbourg from 1951 to 1956. He first appeared in public in Linz in 1956 and assisted Markevitch in Salzburg and Mexico City (1957), Compostela (1966), Madrid (1967) and Monte Carlo (1968).

In 1953, he founded the Orchestre de chambre de Toulouse, which was composed of twelve strings and the harpsichord, and conducted until 1971. The ensemble specialized in Baroque music, but also performed contemporary music. He regularly performed with the Jeunesses musicales de France. In addition to his chamber orchestra, he conducted major orchestras, including the Théâtre du Capitole in Toulouse, the Orchestre de Radio France, and the Orchestre de la Société des Concerts du Conservatoire.

Following a stroke, he remained in a coma for eleven years until his death. He died on March 12, 1982 at age 65.

== Premieres ==
- Maurice Ohana, Font aux cabres (1957)
- André Boucourechliev, Ombres, Hommage à Beethoven (1970)
- Ligeti, Ramifications (Washington, 1970).

== Discography ==
Auriacombe mainly recorded for the EMI/His Master's Voice/Pathé-Marconi/Angel labels, but also for Nonesuch/Elektra and Véga. Some have received the Grand Prix du Disque award.

- Satie, Parade - (26 June 1967, EMI) BnF 38179720t
- Vivaldi, Concertos, including The Four Seasons, Concertos for flute and mandolin etc. - Georges Armand, violin; Michel Debost, flute - Orchestre de chambre de Toulouse, dir. Louis Auriacombe (10-12 June/26-28 September 1967/9-11 April 1969, 5CD EMI 229234 2) BnF 413308259 OCLC 221824241
- Ligeti, Ramifications (27-28 April/4 September 1970, EMI) OCLC 646103849
- Guézec, Successif-simultané and Boucourechliev, Ombres - Orchestre de chambre de Toulouse, dir. Louis Auriacombe (27 April 1970/3 November 1971, EMI) BnF 38182198m
- Mozart, Concerto for flute and harp, Kv.299 - Lily Laskine, harp; Michel Debost, flute; Orchestre de chambre de Toulouse, dir. Louis Auriacombe (EMI)
- Haendel, Concerto for harp, op. 4 n°6, Concerto for oboe, HWV 287 - Pierre Pierlot, oboe; Lily Laskine, harp; Orchestre de chambre de Toulouse, dir. Louis Auriacombe (July 1963, EMI 5653352) OCLC 659284870
- Hindemith, Thème et variations : les quatre tempéraments pour orchestre à cordes et piano - Samson François, piano; Orchestre de chambre de Toulouse, dir. Louis Auriacombe (EMI)

== Bibliography ==
- Pâris, Alain (2015). Dictionnaire des interprètes et de l'interprétation musicale au XX. Bouquins (in French). Paris: Éditions Robert Laffont. pp. 44–45. ISBN 978-2-221-08064-1. OCLC 901287624. Pâris 2015.
- Spieth-Weissenbacher, Christiane (2001). "Auriacombe, Louis". The New Grove Dictionary of Music and Musicians. London: Macmillan Publishers. pp. 25, 000. ISBN 9780195170672.
