= Another Woman (1988 film) =

Film by Woody Allen

- Theatrical release poster
- Directed by: Woody Allen
- Written by: Woody Allen
- Produced by: Robert Greenhut
- Starring: Philip Bosco; Betty Buckley; Blythe Danner; Sandy Dennis; Mia Farrow; Gene Hackman; Ian Holm; John Houseman; Martha Plimpton; Gena Rowlands; David Ogden Stiers; Harris Yulin
- Cinematography: Sven Nykvist
- Edited by: Susan E. Morse
- Distributed by: Orion Pictures
- Release date: October 14, 1988
- Running time: 77 minutes
- Country: United States
- Language: English
- Box office: $1,562,749

Another Woman is a 1988 American drama film written and directed by Woody Allen. It stars Gena Rowlands as a philosophy professor who accidentally overhears the private analysis of a stranger, and finds the woman's regrets and despair awaken something personal in her.

Modern film critics view Another Woman favorably.

== Plot ==
Marion Post is a New York philosophy professor over 50 on a leave of absence to write a new book. Due to construction work in her building, she sublets a furnished apartment downtown for peace and quiet.

Her work there is interrupted by voices from a neighboring office in the building where a therapist conducts his analysis. She quickly realizes that she is privy to the despairing sessions of another woman, Hope, who is disturbed by a growing feeling that her life is false and empty. Her words strike a chord in Marion, who begins to question herself in the same way.

Marion comes to realize that, like her father, she has been unfair, unkind and judgmental to the people closest to her: her unsuccessful brother Paul and his wife Lynn, who feel they embarrass her; her best friend from high school Claire, who feels eclipsed by her; her first husband Sam, who eventually committed suicide; and her stepdaughter Laura, who admires her but resents her high-handedness.

She also realizes that her marriage to her second husband, Ken, is unfulfilling and that she missed her one chance at love with his best friend, Larry. She finally manages to meet the woman in therapy as she contemplates a Klimt painting called "Hope". Although she wants to know more about the woman, she ends up talking more about herself, realizing that she made a mistake by having an abortion years ago and that at her age there are many things in life she will not have anymore.

Marion leaves Ken after catching him in an affair. She resolves to change her life for the better, and takes steps to repair her relationship with Paul and Laura. By the end of the film, she reflects that, for the first time in years, she feels hopeful.

== Cast ==
- Gena Rowlands as Marion Post
- Mia Farrow as Hope
- Ian Holm as Ken Post
- Blythe Danner as Lydia
- Betty Buckley as Kathy
- John Houseman as Marion's Father
- Sandy Dennis as Claire
- Frances Conroy as Lynn
- Philip Bosco as Sam
- Martha Plimpton as Laura
- Harris Yulin as Paul
- Gene Hackman as Larry Lewis
- David Ogden Stiers as Young Marion's Father

== Background ==
Another Woman borrows heavily from the films of Allen's idol Ingmar Bergman, particularly Wild Strawberries, whose main character is an elderly professor who learns from a close relative that his family hates him. Allen also recreates some of Wild Strawberries's dream sequences, and puts Marion into a similar situation as Isak Borg: both characters reexamine their life after friends and family accuse them of being cold and unfeeling. The film has many of Allen's signature features, particularly the New York City setting; only a few scenes are shot outside the city, in the Hamptons. It also uses classical music (Claude Debussy's orchestral arrangement of Erik Satie's Gymnopédie No. 1, renamed Gymnopédie No. 3), and poetry (Rainer Maria Rilke's "Archaic Torso of Apollo") to serve its narrative, as do earlier and later films such as Hannah and Her Sisters, Crimes and Misdemeanors, and Husbands and Wives. It focuses primarily on upper middle class intellectuals, as nearly all of Allen's 1980s films do.

== Reception ==
Another Woman received mixed reviews from critics upon its release. On the review aggregator website Rotten Tomatoes, 59% of 27 critics' reviews are positive, with an average rating of 6.5/10.

Tim Robey of The Daily Telegraph called the film "one of [Allen's] shortest, least funny, and very best films". Roger Ebert of the Chicago Sun-Times similarly praised the film, awarding it a full four stars and writing, "Allen's film is not a remake of Wild Strawberries in any sense, but a meditation on the same theme: the story of a thoughtful person, thoughtfully discovering why she might have benefitted from being a little less thoughtful." Variety praised the film as "brave, in many ways fascinating, and in all respects of a caliber rarely seen."

Vincent Canby of The New York Times was more critical of the film, remarking, "Everyone speaks slightly stilted, epistolary dialogue. The rounded sentences sound as if they'd been written in a French influenced by Flaubert, then translated into English by a lesser student of Constance Garnett." He added, "Mr. Allen is becoming an immensely sophisticated director, but this screenplay is in need of a merciless literary editor. It's full of an earnest teen-age writer's superfluous words, in addition to flashbacks and a dream sequence that contain material better dealt with in the film's contemporary narrative."

Modern reception is often more favorable. It was ranked 13th among Allen's works in a Time Out contributors' poll, with editor Dave Calhoun considering it "further proof that some of Woody’s finest films are those that drop the kvetching men to explore troubled women". It was 19th in Chris Nashawaty's list for Entertainment Weekly. The Daily Telegraph film critics Robbie Collin and Tim Robey named Another Woman the director's fourth-greatest film, praising its "remarkably elegant hold on tone" and lauding Rowlands's performance as one of the finest in any film directed by Allen.

== Soundtrack ==
- Gymnopédie No 1 (1888) - Music by Erik Satie - Performed by Orchestre de la Société des Concerts du Conservatoire - Conducted by Louis Auriacombe
- The Bilbao Song (1929) - Music by Kurt Weill and Bertolt Brecht - Performed by Bernie Leighton
- Unaccompanied Cello Suite in D Major - Written by Johann Sebastian Bach - Performed by Yo-Yo Ma
- Ecuatorial (1934) - Music by Edgard Varèse - Performed by Ensemble Intercontemporain - Conducted by Pierre Boulez
- Perdido (1941) - Written by Juan Tizol - Performed by Dave Brubeck Quartet
- You'd Be So Nice to Come Home To (1943) - Written by Cole Porter - Performed by Jim Hall
- Lovely to Look At (1935) - Music by Jerome Kern - Performed by Bernie Leighton
- A Fine Romance (1936) - Music by Jerome Kern - Performed by Erroll Garner
- Make Believe (1927) - Music by Jerome Kern - Performed by Erroll Garner
- Symphony No.4 in G Major (1901) - Written by Gustav Mahler - Performed by New York Philharmonic - Directed by Leonard Bernstein
- Smiles (1917) - Music by Lee S. Roberts - Performed by Teddy Wilson
- On the Sunny Side of the Street( 1930) - Music by Jimmy McHugh - Performed by Teddy Wilson
- Sonata for Cello and Piano No.2 BWV 1028 (1721) - Music by Johann Sebastian Bach - Performed by Mischa Maisky & Martha Argerich
- Roses of Picardy (1916) - Music by Haydn Wood - Performed by Frankie Carle
- Sonata for Cello and Piano No.3 BWV 1029 (1721) - Music by Johann Sebastian Bach - Performed by Mischa Maisky & Martha Argerich
