= Tallahassee 7000 =

1961 American TV series

Tallahassee 7000 is a 1961 American syndicated TV series starring Walter Matthau as Special Agent Lex Rogers of the Florida Sheriffs Bureau. It consists of 26 episodes in 30-minute time slots.

The Bureau (the only one of its kind in the United States) helped sheriffs in Florida's 67 counties. The show's title is the alpha-numeric phone number of the Bureau, for example: TA 7000. Rogers's headquarters are in Miami Beach, and episodes focus on his investigations.

The program was filmed on location in Florida, and was produced for syndication by Screen Gems. Herbert B. Leonard was executive producer. Matthau disliked television and says he took the job "only for the minor inconvenience of making a living".

Matthau's biographers called it "another Matthau career nadir".
