= Night Moves (1975 film) =

American thriller film by Arthur Penn

- Theatrical release poster
- Directed by: Arthur Penn
- Written by: Alan Sharp
- Produced by: Robert M. Sherman
- Starring: Gene Hackman; Susan Clark
- Cinematography: Bruce Surtees
- Edited by: Dede Allen; Stephen A. Rotter
- Music by: Michael Small
- Production companies: Hiller Productions, Ltd. – Layton
- Distributed by: Warner Bros.
- Release dates: June 11, 1975 (New York City); July 2, 1975 (Los Angeles)
- Running time: 99 minutes
- Country: United States
- Language: English

Night Moves is a 1975 American neo-noir thriller film directed by Arthur Penn from a screenplay by Alan Sharp. It stars Gene Hackman as an ex-professional football player turned Los Angeles private investigator, who uncovers a series of sinister events while searching for the missing teenaged daughter of a former film actress. The cast also features Susan Clark, Edward Binns, Jennifer Warren, James Woods, and Melanie Griffith in her film debut.

The film was released by Warner Bros. on June 11, 1975. It received positive reviews from critics, but a lukewarm commercial reception. Hackman was nominated for a BAFTA Award for Best Actor for his performance. In the years since its release, Night Moves has attracted viewers and significant critical attention following its home media releases. It has been called "a seminal modern noir work from the 1970s."

== Plot ==
Harry Moseby is an ex-professional football player working as a private investigator in Los Angeles. He learns through his friend Nick that a fortune can be made in Mexican artifacts, as the country is cracking down on the theft of its Native American legacy, but is not interested. He later accidentally learns his wife Ellen is having a love affair with a man named Marty Heller.

Aging former actress Arlene Iverson hires Harry to find her 16-year-old daughter Delly Grastner. Arlene's only source of income is her daughter's trust fund, but it requires Delly to be living with her. Arlene gives Harry the name of one of Delly's friends in Los Angeles, a mechanic and spurned paramour named Quentin. Quentin tells Harry that he last saw Delly at a New Mexico film location, where she flirted with one of Arlene's old flames, stuntman Marv Ellman. Harry realizes that the injuries to Quentin's face are from fighting the stuntman. He talks with Ellman and stunt coordinator Joey Ziegler. Before returning to Los Angeles, Harry is surprised to see Quentin working on Ellman's stunt plane.

Harry travels to the Florida Keys, where Delly's stepfather Tom Iverson lives, and finds Delly staying with Tom and his girlfriend Paula. Harry shows Paula a famous series of chess game turns in a match which involved a coup-de-grace of three knight moves. Tom admits to having been intimate with Delly, and agrees she should return to her mother. Harry, Paula, and Delly take a boat trip to go swimming, but Delly becomes distraught when she finds the submerged wreckage of a small plane with the decomposing body of the pilot inside. Paula marks the spot with a buoy. They return to the shore and Paula makes a telephone call to report the find to the Coast Guard. She later visits Harry's bungalow and the two have sex.

Delly agrees to return to her mother; Harry delivers her to Arlene and picks up his check. As he leaves, he sees them arguing. Harry gets together with Nick and Joey to go to a football game in LA, where Joey indicates he has arranged for Delly to get a SAG card as a favor to Arlene. Harry later listens to an answering-machine message from Delly apparently offering a tip, but he turns it off mid-message to focus on his marriage. He tells Ellen he will give up his occupation, which has come between them.

Harry learns from Ellen that Delly has been killed in a car accident on a movie set. Harry questions the driver of the car, Joey, who is in a cast. Joey lets him view footage of the crash, raising Harry's suspicions about Quentin the mechanic. Harry goes to the home of Arlene, who now stands to inherit her daughter's wealth, and finds her drunk by the pool. He tracks down Quentin, who denies being the killer but reveals that the dead pilot is Ellman, who was involved in smuggling. Quentin flees before Harry can learn more.

Harry and Ellen attempt to reconcile. He decides to pursue the case and returns to Florida, where he finds Quentin's dead body floating in Tom's dolphin atrium. He accuses Tom of the murder; Tom confesses, they fight, and Tom is knocked unconscious. Paula admits she did not report the dead body in the plane to the Coast Guard because the aircraft contained a valuable relic they were smuggling in from the Yucatán.

Harry and Paula set off in a boat to retrieve the relic. They arrive at its location, marked by a buoy, and Paula dives to retrieve it. A floatplane flies by the boat. Its pilot strafes the boat with a submachine gun, wounding Harry in the leg. The plane lands and taxies towards the boat. As Paula surfaces with the sculpture buoyed up by an inflatable life raft, the pilot taxies over and kills her, but also, the plane crashes into the large stone sculpture before flipping over next to the boat. As the cockpit sinks, Harry is able to see the drowning pilot through the plane's windshield, recognizing Joey Ziegler. Bleeding profusely, Harry starts one engine of the boat, but collapses in pain as the boat idly circles on the spot.

== Cast ==
- Gene Hackman as Harry Moseby
- Susan Clark as Ellen Moseby
- Jennifer Warren as Paula
- Edward Binns as Joey Ziegler
- Harris Yulin as Marty Heller
- Kenneth Mars as Nick
- Janet Ward as Arlene Iverson
- Melanie Griffith as Delly Grastner
- James Woods as Quentin
- Anthony Costello as Marvin "Marv" Ellman
- John Crawford as Tom Iverson
- Ben Archibek as Charles
- Dennis Dugan as Boy
- C.J. Hincks as Girl
- Maxwell Gail, Jr. as Stud

== Production ==
Night Moves was shot in the fall of 1973, but since Melanie Griffith was just 16 at the time her underwater nude scenes were filmed, the movie was not released until 1975. The role of Ellen, played by Susan Clark, was originally offered to Faye Dunaway, who turned it down to star in Chinatown. Dunaway had just split from one of the film's stars, Harris Yulin, after a two-year relationship. Night Moves's original title, Dark Tower, had to be changed so as to not confuse the film with the 1974 blockbuster hit The Towering Inferno.

Composer Michael Small developed music from the film's score into a song with lyrics by Michael Franks. Small later recalled that Franks adapted the film's recurring theme for the song. Franks said in 2026 that it had originally been intended as an end-title number to be recorded by Roberta Flack. The plan was abandoned, and Franks subsequently recorded the song, "Nightmoves", for his 1976 album The Art of Tea.

Director Arthur Penn suggested that Small incorporate Latin jazz elements into the score to foreshadow the story's Florida Keys setting. Small used percussion and Latin inflections even in the Los Angeles scenes, and described the recurring theme as serving both the film's mystery and Moseby's loneliness. Played on vibraphone with a Bossa nova feel, the theme is transformed into a samba during the final sequence, which Small associated with the unresolved mystery and the image of the boat circling without a captain.

The house belonging to James Woods' character Quentin was owned by Phil Kaufman, road manager for Gram Parsons at the time of Parsons's death. Kaufman's subsequent actions became the basis for the 2003 film Grand Theft Parsons. The cast and crew of Night Moves were shooting at the house on the day the police came to question Kaufman, and as they were taking him away, Arthur Penn turned to Gene Hackman and said, "Man, we're shooting the wrong movie".

According to Arthur Penn, he intended to create a "countergenre film" about a "mystery for which no solution exists or can be found."

=== My Night at Maud's ===
A line from Night Moves occurs when Moseby declines an invitation from his wife to see the movie My Night at Maud's (1970): "I saw a Rohmer film once. It was kinda like watching paint dry." The exchange from Night Moves was quoted in director Éric Rohmer's New York Times obituary in 2010. Arthur Penn was an admirer of Rohmer's films; Bruce Jackson has written an extended discussion of the role of My Night at Maud's in Night Moves; its protagonist and Moseby have related opportunities for infidelity, but respond differently.

== Release ==
=== Home media ===
Night Moves was released in 1992 in the U.S. as a LaserDisc and as a VHS-format videotape. In 2005, it was released as a DVD in the U.S. and Canada (region 1). The DVD was favorably reviewed by Walter Chaw, who writes, "Shot through with grain and a certain, specific colour blanch I associate with the best movies from what I believe to be the best era in film history, Night Moves looks on Warner's DVD as good as it ever has, or, I daresay, should." A region 2 DVD was released in 2007. The film was released on Blu-ray in 2017 by Warner Archive Collection. A Criterion Collection 4k/Blu-ray edition was released on March 25, 2025.

== Reception ==
=== Box office ===
Night Moves was not a commercial success at the time of its 1975 theatrical release.

=== Critical response ===
On the review aggregator website Rotten Tomatoes, 78% of 90 critics' reviews are positive. The website's consensus reads: "A neo-noir that favors rich psychological depth and mood over suspense, Night Moves is elevated by Arthur Penn's introspective direction and Gene Hackman's brooding performance." Metacritic, which uses a weighted average, assigned the film a score of 82 out of 100, based on nine critics, indicating "universal acclaim".

Roger Ebert gave the film a full four stars and called it "one of the best psychological thrillers in a long time, probably since Don't Look Now. It has an ending that comes not only as a complete surprise — which would be easy enough — but that also pulls everything together in a new way, one we hadn't thought of before, one that's almost unbearably poignant." Ebert ranked Night Moves at No. 2 on his year-end list of the best films of 1975, behind only Nashville. Vincent Canby of The New York Times wrote that he had "mixed feelings" about the film, elaborating that the characters "seem to deserve better than the quality of the narrative given them. I can't figure out whether the screenplay by Alan Sharp was worked on too much or not enough, or whether Mr. Penn and his actors accepted the screenplay with more respect than it deserves." Gene Siskel of the Chicago Tribune gave the film three stars out of four and stated that the protagonist is the "kind of mixed-up character" that "seems to be Hackman's specialty", while Alan Sharp's screenplay "provides the character of Paula (Jennifer Warren) with some of the best scripting for any woman this year". Arthur D. Murphy of Variety called the film "a paradox. A suspenseless suspenser, very well cast with players who lend sustained interest to largely theatrical characters ... There's little rhyme or reason for the plot's progression, and the climax is far from stunning. But the curious aspect about the Warner Bros. release is that it plays well." Kevin Thomas of the Los Angeles Times described the film as "a stunning, stylish detective mystery in the classic Raymond Chandler-Ross Macdonald mold," as well as "a fast, often funny movie with lots of compassionately observed real, living, breathing people. This handsome Warners presentation is still another triumph for ever-busy, ever-versatile Gene Hackman, director Arthur Penn and writer Alan Sharp."

Gary Arnold of The Washington Post was negative, stating, "The fatal weakness is Alan Sharp's screenplay, a pointlessly murky, ambiguous variation on conventional private-eye themes ... we're supposed to be so impressed by the dolorous, world-weary tone that we overlook some pretty awesome loopholes and absurdities in the story itself, which never generates much mystery, suspense or credible human interest."

=== Retrospective reviews ===
Night Moves continues to attract critical attention long after its release. Film critic Michael Sragow included the film in his 1990 review collection entitled Produced and Abandoned: The Best Films You've Never Seen. Stephen Prince has written, "Penn directed a group of key pictures in the late 1960s and early 1970s (Bonnie and Clyde (1967), Alice's Restaurant (1969), Little Big Man (1970), Night Moves [1975]) that captured the verve of the counterculture, its subsequent collapse, and the ensuing despair of the post-Watergate era."

Robert P. Kolker writes, in his monograph, The Cinema of Loneliness: Penn, Stone, Kubrick, Scorsese, Spielberg, Altman, "Night Moves was Penn's point of turning, his last carefully structured work, a strong and bitter film, whose bitterness emerges from an anxiety and from a loneliness that exists as a given, rather than a loneliness fought against, a fight that marks most of Penn's best work. Night Moves is a film of impotence and despair, and it marks the end of a cycle of films."

Dennis Schwartz characterizes the film as "a seminal modern noir work from the 1970s" and adds, "This is arguably the best film that Arthur Penn has ever done." This remark is telling in the context of Penn's earlier film, Bonnie and Clyde (1967), which is now considered a classic by most critics.

Roger Ebert added the film to his "Great Movies" list in 2006. Jack Hawkins of Slash Film listed Night Moves among the most underrated films of the 1970s, describing the film as "a brilliant neo-noir that teems with salacious, jaded energy."

In 2010, Manohla Dargis described it as "the great, despairing Night Moves (1975), with Gene Hackman as a private detective who ends up circling the abyss, a no‑exit comment on the post-1968, post-Watergate times."

Griffith's appearance in the film garnered particular controversy for one nude scene that was shot when she was only 16 years old, though she also appeared nude in other films such as Smile, which was released the same year.

Night Moves has been classified by some critics as a "neo-noir" film, representing a further development of the film noir detective story. Ronald Schwartz summarizes its role: "Harry Moseby is a man with limitations and weaknesses, a new dimension for detectives in the 1970s. Gone are the Philip Marlowes and tough-guy private investigators who have tremendous insight into crime and can triumph over criminals because they carry within them a code of honor. Harry cannot fathom what honor is, much less be subsumed by it."

=== Awards and nominations ===
Award	Year	Category	Nominee	Result
British Academy Film Award	1976	Best Actor in a Leading Role	Gene Hackman	Nominated (shared with French Connection II)
New York Film Critics Circle Award	1975	Best Actor	Gene Hackman	Nominated

== See also ==
- List of American films of 1975
- Florida locations where filming took place:

- Sanibel
- Wakulla Springs

== Sources ==
- Ebert, Roger (2006). Awake in the Dark: The Best of Roger Ebert. University of Chicago Press. ISBN 978-0-226-18201-8.
- Kolker, Robert (2000). The Cinema of Loneliness: Penn, Stone, Kubrick, Scorsese, Spielberg, Altman (3rd ed.). Oxford. ISBN 978-0-19-512350-0.
- Penn, Arthur; Chaiken, Michael; Cronin, Paul (2008). Arthur Penn: Interviews. Univ. Press of Mississippi. ISBN 978-1-60473-105-7.
- Prince, Stephen (2002). A New Pot of Gold: Hollywood Under the Electronic Rainbox (1980–1989). University of California. p. 232. ISBN 978-0-520-23266-2.
- Sanders, Steven; Skoble, Aeon J. (2008). The Philosophy of TV Noir. University of Kentucky Press. ISBN 978-0813172620.
- Slifkin, Irv (2004). VideoHound's groovy movies: far-out films of the psychedelic era. Visible Ink Press. ISBN 978-1-57859-155-8.
- Schwartz, Ronald (2005). Neo-noir: The New Film Noir Style from Psycho to Collateral. Rowman & Littlefield. ISBN 978-0-8108-5676-9.
- Sragow, Michael (1990). Produced and Abandoned: The Best Films You've Never Seen. Mercury House. ISBN 978-0-916515-84-3.
