= I Never Sang for My Father =

1970 film by Gilbert Cates

- film poster
- Directed by: Gilbert Cates
- Screenplay by: Robert Anderson
- Based on: I Never Sang for My Father; 1968 play by Robert Anderson
- Produced by: Gilbert Cates
- Starring: Melvyn Douglas; Gene Hackman; Dorothy Stickney; Estelle Parsons; Elizabeth Hubbard
- Cinematography: Morris Hartzband; George Stoetzel
- Edited by: Angelo Ross
- Music by: Al Gorgoni; Barry Mann
- Distributed by: Columbia Pictures
- Release date: October 18, 1970
- Running time: 92 minutes
- Country: United States
- Language: English

I Never Sang for My Father is a 1970 American drama film. It tells the story of a widowed college professor who feels dominated by his aging father, yet still has regrets about his plan to leave him behind when he remarries and moves to California. It stars Melvyn Douglas, Gene Hackman, Dorothy Stickney, Estelle Parsons, and Elizabeth Hubbard.

The film was produced and directed by Gilbert Cates, and Robert Anderson adapted the screenplay from his 1968 Broadway play.

It was nominated for Academy Awards for Best Actor in a Leading Role (Melvyn Douglas), Best Actor in a Supporting Role (Gene Hackman), and Best Writing, Screenplay Based on Material from Another Medium (Robert Anderson).

== Plot ==
At the airport, college professor Gene Garrison meets his parents, who have returned from Florida. After driving them home, he takes them out to dinner. Back home, he spends the evening with them. The barbs of his father, Tom, run through his mind as he drives home. Gene seeks solace in the arms of Norma, a woman he's been seeing, who pines for a more serious relationship. Soon after, his mother, Margaret, suffers a heart attack and is hospitalized. Upon visiting her at the hospital, Gene finds Tom pacing in the waiting room. Tom asks Gene to go to the Rotary Club with him, though Gene was expecting not to leave his mother's side.

When Margaret dies, Gene helps his father shop for a casket. His sister, Alice, arrives without her husband and children. She explains to Gene that Tom's failing memory and health will require constant care either in a nursing home or with live-in assistance. She broaches the idea with their father, who rejects it outright. The conversation brings up old tensions about Tom's disinheritance of Alice over her taking a Jewish spouse. Alice leaves Gene to deal with their father by himself.

Gene's girlfriend Peggy arrives for a visit. She is charmed by Tom and offers to relocate to New York to live with Gene and his father. That night, Gene and Tom reminisce together over old photographs. Tom's love for his son comes shining through in their conversation and he asks about a tune that Gene used to sing for him as a boy. Gene confesses that he never sang the tune for his father, but Tom recalls otherwise. Gene tells Tom that he is thinking about moving to California to be with Peggy, where she has a successful gynecological practice. Tom becomes irate at the notion, feeling abandoned. After a bitter argument between the two men, in which Tom in rage tells Gene that he is dead to him and that he doesn't need him, slams the door shut after him. The frame freezes and in the narration, Gene comments that he did move to California and marry Peggy and there were a few visits back and forth between Gene and his family and Tom. He ends the movie by stating that Tom ended up in a hospital, unaware of his surroundings and died by himself without an "orange" referring back to how Tom's father died by himself in a hospital the day after he asked him for some fruit and he sent him oranges.

== Cast ==
- Melvyn Douglas as Tom Garrison - Father
- Gene Hackman as Gene Garrison - Son
- Estelle Parsons as Alice - Sister
- Dorothy Stickney as Margaret Garrison - Mother
- Elizabeth Hubbard as Doctor Margaret 'Peggy' Thayer
- Lovelady Powell as Norma
- Daniel Keyes as Dr. Mayberry
- Conrad Bain as Rev. Sam Pell
- Jon Richards as Marvin Scott
- Nikki Counselman as Waitress
- Carol Peterson as Nurse #1
- Sloane Shelton as Nurse #2
- James Karen as Mr. Tucker (old age home director)
- Gene Williams as Dr. Jensen (state hospital director)

== Production ==
=== Original play ===
Gilbert Cates had been one of the producers of the original stage play together with Doris Warner Vidor. Directed by Alan Schneider and starring Alan Webb, Lillian Gish and Hal Holbrook, it initially ran for 124 performances in New York in 1968 and lost most of its $195,000 investment. The story was widely considered to be quasi-autobiographical.

The play was profiled in the William Goldman book The Season: A Candid Look at Broadway.

=== Filming ===
The film was shot at several locations, including Southern California and the Great Neck-Douglaston area of New York. Applauded by critics and viewers, the film (and play) predicted the coming of the sandwich generation, in this case, grown children and other family members helping their elderly parents who are up in age.

== Critical reception ==
Roger Ebert summarized the film in his review: "These bare bones of plot hardly give any hint of the power of this film. I've suggested something of what it's about, but almost nothing about the way the writing, the direction, and the performances come together to create one of the most unforgettably human films I can remember."

Vincent Canby, in his review for The New York Times, was far less complimentary, writing "(The film) does the human spirit a disservice in the way it pleads for sympathy for people who are small and flat, like comic strip characters, without sweetness, without imagination, without any suspected reserves of emotion. Indeed, it almost becomes ridiculous when you realize that it is without any honest problem, either psychological or economic." Murf. of Variety called it " dull, distended, and lacking clear point of view"; however, he called the performances of the lead actors "superb".

=== Awards and nominations ===
Award	Category	Nominee(s)	Result	Ref.
Academy Awards	Best Actor	Melvyn Douglas	Nominated	
Academy Awards	Best Supporting Actor	Gene Hackman	Nominated	
Academy Awards	Best Screenplay – Based on Material from Another Medium	Robert Anderson	Nominated	
Golden Globe Awards	Best Motion Picture – Drama		Nominated	
Golden Globe Awards	Best Actor in a Motion Picture – Drama	Melvyn Douglas	Nominated	
Laurel Awards	Top Male Dramatic Performance	Melvyn Douglas	5th Place	
National Board of Review Awards	Top Ten Films		6th Place	
New York Film Critics Circle Awards	Best Actor	Melvyn Douglas	Runner-up	
Writers Guild of America Awards	Best Drama – Adapted from Another Medium	Robert Anderson	Won	

== See also ==
- List of American films of 1970
