= Twice in a Lifetime (film) =

1985 film by Bud Yorkin

- Theatrical release poster
- Directed by: Bud Yorkin
- Screenplay by: Colin Welland
- Produced by: David Salven; Bud Yorkin
- Starring: Gene Hackman; Ann-Margret; Ellen Burstyn; Amy Madigan; Ally Sheedy; Brian Dennehy
- Cinematography: Nick McLean
- Edited by: Robert C. Jones
- Music by: Pat Metheny
- Distributed by: Bud Yorkin Productions
- Release dates: 9 May 1985 (Seattle International Film Festival); 23 October 1985 (New York City)
- Running time: 111 minutes
- Countries: United Kingdom; United States
- Language: English
- Budget: $8 million
- Box office: $8,402,424

Twice in a Lifetime is a 1985 American drama film directed by Bud Yorkin and starring Gene Hackman as a married steelworker in a mid-life crisis who becomes attracted to another woman, played by Ann-Margret. Ellen Burstyn, Amy Madigan, Ally Sheedy, and Brian Dennehy co-star. The film is a remake of the 1973 Play for Today episode "Kisses at Fifty", by the same writer.

Paul McCartney composed and performed the theme song to the film, heard over the end credits. It remained commercially unavailable as a recording until 1993 when it was included as a bonus track on a reissue of McCartney's album Pipes of Peace.

== Plot ==
Harry Mackenzie works in a steel mill factory during the day and returns to a comfortable marriage each night, which, while lacking excitement and passion, is stable. His wife Kate and their adult daughters, Helen and Sunny, celebrate Harry's 50th birthday. Kate encourages him to visit his favorite corner tavern and enjoy himself. There, his friends, including Nick, hold a birthday celebration and gift him a Seattle Seahawks jacket. Harry meets Audrey Minelli, a newly hired barmaid, who captures his interest. Harry flirts endlessly and dances with her.

The next day, Harry sees Audrey again. He drives her to a nearby restaurant, where she states she has been recently widowed. As Harry has a second date, Kate's coworker Susie witnesses Harry kiss Audrey, and then tells Kate about the affair. When Kate returns home, she questions Harry about Audrey. Harry confesses to the affair, and tells Audrey that Kate knows about their relationship. Audrey responds that for the affair to continue, he needs to choose either her or Kate.

Harry's affair infuriates Sunny, who is having a difficult marriage herself with her husband Keith. Harry's adult son Jerry arrives into town and scolds his father for having an affair. As Harry has drinks with Nick, Sunny brings her mother into the tavern to confront her father. Harry tries to quiet his daughter but it escalates into an argument, in which Harry leaves the bar with Kate. Sunny tells Audrey to leave her father alone. Audrey is then fired from her job.

Audrey approaches Harry when he leaves work and suggests they should end their affair. Harry however is unconcerned about his family's reaction to their affair. He returns home and tells Kate he wants a divorce. Kate mourns the end of their marriage, and Harry consoles her. With a new direction in life, Harry moves into his own apartment and resumes his relationship with Audrey. Meanwhile, Helen and Sunny encourage their mother to move on, but Kate yells at them and demands more time to cope.

As Harry and Audrey enjoy life together, Helen tells Sunny she will not attend college and instead marry her boyfriend, Tim. Sunny however disapproves, stating that married life is difficult. Before long, Kate strives to start a new chapter in life, in which she changes her hair, gets her ears pierced, and returns to her salon workplace. As Kate prepares for Helen's wedding, Sunny questions her mother if she would hypothetically take Harry back. Kate replies she is unsure, but if she did, it would be her decision.

The night before the wedding, Harry visits Helen at the house. He tells Helen not to rush into marriage too early, but Helen reassures him that her marriage will succeed. Harry attends the wedding, and afterwards, he congratulates Tim as his new son-in-law. Harry tries to make amends with Sunny, but she refuses. The family takes a photo together before Tim and Helen drive away for their honeymoon. However, Kate does not invite Harry to the reception, though Harry remains cordial with Jerry. Harry leaves the church with a bouquet of wedding flowers, certain in his new future with Audrey.

== Cast ==
- Gene Hackman as Harry Mackenzie
- Ann-Margret as Audrey Minelli
- Ellen Burstyn as Kate Mackenzie
- Amy Madigan as Sunny Mackenzie-Sobel
- Ally Sheedy as Helen Mackenzie
- Brian Dennehy as Nick
- Stephen Lang as Keith Sobel
- Darrell Larson as Jerry Mackenzie

== Release ==
The film premiered at the Seattle International Film Festival on 9 May 1985. It opened on Wednesday, 23 October 1985, at the Beekman Theatre in New York, grossing $68,039 in its opening week, and then it opened in Los Angeles, Seattle and Toronto the following week.

== Reception ==
On the review aggregator website Rotten Tomatoes, 83% of 6 critics' reviews are positive. Audiences polled by CinemaScore gave the film an average grade of "C+" on an A+ to F scale.

=== Awards ===
Hackman received a Golden Globe nomination for Best Performance by an Actor in a Motion Picture - Drama. Amy Madigan received nominations from both the Golden Globes and the Oscars for Best Supporting Actress.

Year	Award	Category/Recipient(s)	Result	Reference
1986	58th Academy Awards	Best Supporting Actress (Amy Madigan)	Nominated	
1986	43rd Golden Globe Awards	Best Actor – Motion Picture Drama (Gene Hackman)	Nominated	
1986	43rd Golden Globe Awards	Best Supporting Actress – Motion Picture (Amy Madigan)	Nominated	
