= Under Fire (1983 film) =

1983 film by Roger Spottiswoode

- Theatrical release poster by Drew Struzan
- Directed by: Roger Spottiswoode
- Screenplay by: Clayton Frohman; Ron Shelton
- Story by: Clayton Frohman
- Produced by: Jonathan Taplin
- Starring: Nick Nolte; Gene Hackman; Joanna Cassidy; Jean-Louis Trintignant; Richard Masur; Ed Harris
- Cinematography: John Alcott
- Edited by: Mark Conte; John Bloom
- Music by: Jerry Goldsmith
- Distributed by: Orion Pictures
- Release date: October 21, 1983
- Running time: 128 minutes
- Country: United States
- Languages: English; Spanish
- Budget: $9.5 million
- Box office: $5,696,391

Under Fire is a 1983 American political thriller film set during the last days of the Nicaraguan Revolution that ended the Somoza regime in 1979. Directed by Roger Spottiswoode, it stars Nick Nolte, Gene Hackman and Joanna Cassidy. The musical score by Jerry Goldsmith, which featured jazz guitarist Pat Metheny, was nominated for an Oscar for Best Original Score. The editing by Mark Conte and John Bloom was nominated for a BAFTA Award for Best Editing. The film was shot in the Mexican states of Chiapas and Oaxaca.

== Plot ==
Russell Price is a photojournalist covering a military conflict in Chad, where he runs into Oates, a mercenary he knows. Russell then returns to his hotel, where he attends a "Bon Voyage" party for his friend Alex Grazier, who is giving up covering foreign conflicts to take a lucrative job as a news anchor in New York. It is revealed that Russell is having an affair with Alex's girlfriend, fellow journalist Claire Stryder. Alex's article about the conflict in Chad is paired with Russell's photography to land a cover story in Time magazine.

The journalists then travel to Nicaragua to join the international press corps covering a conflict between the government of President Somoza and rebels led by Rafael, an underground figure who has never been photographed. Russell is arrested for no legitimate reason and spends a night in jail. He and Claire meet Marcel Jazy, a French spy who is closely connected to Somoza, who tips them off that they might find Rafael in León, even though the press corps believes the fighting is shifting to Masaya.

They go to León and cover an intense rooftop gun battle between rebels and government troops. Russell meets rebels led by Pedro who gives him a baseball to take to Dennis Martinez. After more fighting, Russell again meets Oates, who is now fighting for the Nicaraguan government. Afterwards, Oates shoots Pedro in the back, killing him, but Russell does not reveal Oates' location, in order to avoid picking a side in the conflict.

Claire and Russell attend a press conference where President Somoza announces that Rafael has been killed. They then meet rebels who promise to take them to meet Rafael. Led to a remote rebel stronghold, they realize that Rafael is indeed dead, and the rebels ask Russell to fake a living photo of their leader, believing this will sustain the movement long enough to win a victory. Although conflicted, Claire and Russell agree to help the rebels.

The photo is a success, and Alex comes to Nicaragua to get Russell to arrange an interview with Rafael. Alex learns of Russell's affair with his girlfriend, but does not sever his relationship with the photographer. The two go to find Rafael as the war escalates. They are detained and again meet Oates, who this time is with government troops who are conducting a mass execution. Russell learns from Oates that Jazy has been using him to get photographs of rebel leaders, who are then targeted for assassination.

Alex learns that Rafael is dead and Claire and Russell have violated journalistic ethics. Nevertheless, he agrees to not expose them, and will do a fluff piece on Jazy instead. Russell tries to arrange the interview, but fighting has become even more intense as the government is losing the war. Lost on their way back to the hotel, Alex asks government troops for assistance, but they are paranoid and execute him in the street while Russell takes pictures. Russell then escapes from the troops with the help of a local woman who hides him in her home.

Realizing it will end his regime if it is revealed that government troops killed a famous American journalist, President Somoza reports that rebels killed Alex and troops desperately search for Russell to kill him and destroy the pictures. Russell witnesses rebels killing Jazy. Claire is able to get the negatives back to the hotel, then goes to find Russell.

Russell's photographs are broadcast worldwide and Somoza flees to Miami. With the rebels victorious, Claire and Russell are reunited and leave the country. In the final scene, she asks "Do you think we fell in love with too much?", and he replies "I'd do it again."

== Cast ==
- Nick Nolte as Russell Price
- Gene Hackman as Alex Grazier
- Joanna Cassidy as Claire Stryder
- Ed Harris as Oates
- Jean-Louis Trintignant as Marcel Jazy
- Richard Masur as Hub Kittle
- René Enríquez as Anastasio Somoza Debayle
- Hamilton Camp as Regis
- Alma Martínez as Isela
- Eloy Casados as Pedro
- Jenny Gago as Miss Panama
- Jorge Zepeda as Rafael
- Elpidia Carrillo as a Sandinista

== Historical basis ==
Though the film is largely fictional, it was inspired by the murder of ABC reporter Bill Stewart and his translator Juan Espinoza by Nicaraguan National Guard troops on June 20, 1979. ABC cameraman Jack Clark was shooting "incidental" footage, and caught the entire episode on tape. The footage was shown on national television in the United States and became a major international incident, undermining what remained of dictator Anastasio Somoza's support. The US Government had already stopped military aid to Nicaragua and its National Guard in 1978, but the incident was the final straw for the Carter Administration's relationship with Somoza, whose regime fell on July 19.

== Reception ==
=== Box office ===
Under Fire opened October 21, 1983 in 816 theaters, earning $1,837,768 ($2,252 average per theater) its opening weekend. The film went on to gross a total of $5,696,391 in North America.

=== Critical response ===
Under Fire received a positive response from critics and holds a 91% "Fresh" rating on the review aggregator Rotten Tomatoes from 22 reviews.

Roger Ebert of the Chicago Sun-Times awarded the film three and a half out of four stars, praising the performances and declaring it one of the year's best films, saying, "The actors in Under Fire never step wrong. Nolte is great to watch as the seedy photographer with the beer gut. Hackman never really convinced me that he could be an anchorman, but he did a better thing. He convinced me that he thought he could be one. Joanna Cassidy takes a role that could have been dismissed as 'the girl' and fills it out as a fascinating, textured adult. Under Fire surrounds these performances with a vivid sense of place and becomes, somewhat surprisingly, one of the year's best films." Geoff Andrew of Time Out praised the film as "tak[ing] an honourable place alongside classic war-torn romance pictures like Casablanca and To Have and Have Not" and concluded by calling it "a thrilling film, with a head, a heart, and muscle."

John Simon of National Review wrote: "Under Fire is no masterpiece, but it gives you plenty to absorb and think about. How many films nowadays can make that claim?"

Vincent Canby of The New York Times, however, viewed the film less favorably, saying "Under Fire, which was written by Ron Shelton and Clayton Frohman, from a story by Mr. Frohman, means well but it is fatally confused. It's silly enough to use a real, bloody war as the backdrop - the excuse, really - for the raising of the consciousnesses of a couple of mini-characters."

== See also ==
- Salvador – 1986 war drama film directed by Oliver Stone
