= Julie Andrews discography =

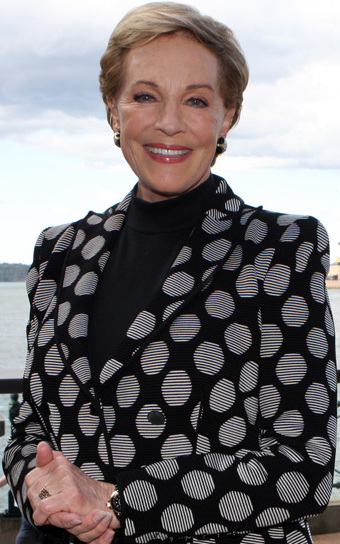
- Andrews in An Evening with Julie Andrews media conference at Park Hyatt, Sydney, Australia – 16th May 2013
- Studio albums: 13
- Soundtrack albums: 11
- Live albums: 1
- Compilation albums: 16
- Singles: 16
- Cast recordings: 15

The discography of Julie Andrews, an English actress, singer, and author, encompasses a wide range of recordings spanning over six decades. Her work includes studio albums, live albums, soundtracks, cast recordings, compilations, and singles, contemplating her extensive career in musical theater, film, and television.

Julie Andrews' earliest recordings trace back to 1947, when she appeared on Starlight Roof, a West End revue. Her first recorded performance was the "Polonaise" from Mignon, issued as a two-record 78 RPM set. This release features an introduction and conversation with a twelve-year-old Andrews conducted by Vic Oliver, followed by her performance. In 1948, Columbia issued several additional 78 RPM records featuring Andrews. Among them is the single "Je Veux Vivre"/"Come to the Fair", which includes a rendition of the waltz from Gounod's Romeo and Juliet and an English air, performed as a duet with her stepfather, Ted Andrews, with piano accompaniment by her mother. Another 1948 release, "Ah! Vous Dirai–Je Mama"/"The Wren", presents Andrews performing works by Mozart and traditional songs, accompanied on piano by her mother and introduced by her stepfather.

Andrews also participated in several radio and television-related recordings. In 1950, she took part in Jack and the Beanstalk, a 12-inch 78 RPM record from the British radio series Educating Archie, issued by His Master's Voice. Her first long-playing (LP) album was released in 1955 and titled The Boy Friend. In 1956, Decca released the music from the television special High Tor, in which Andrews performed alongside Bing Crosby. Andrews' first solo studio effort was The Lass with the Delicate Air (1957) and the singer progressed through notable soundtrack releases tied to her iconic film roles, alongside cast recordings from Broadway and West End productions. Her discography is documented across various labels, including RCA Victor, Columbia, and Philips, with formats evolving from LP to CD over time.

Andrews achieved significant chart success, particularly with soundtracks like Mary Poppins (1964) and The Sound of Music (1965), both of which topped the US and UK charts and earned multi-platinum certifications from the RIAA. Other notable entries include the cast recording of My Fair Lady (1956), which also reached number one in both regions, and studio albums such as Love Me Tender (1982), peaking at number 63 on the UK Albums Chart. Her singles, including "Supercalifragilisticexpialidocious" (US #66, 1964) and "Thoroughly Modern Millie" (US AC #3, 1967), further highlight her presence on the charts. This article details her discography, incorporating peak chart positions and certifications as reported by sources such as the Official Charts Company and Billboard.

== Albums ==
=== Studio albums ===
Year	Title	Album details	Peak chart positions	
Year	Title	Album details	US	UK
1957	Tell It Again – Songs of Sense & Nonsense (Julie Andrews & Martyn Green)	Released: 1957; Label: Angel Records (#65041); Format: LP, CD	—	—
1957	The Lass with the Delicate Air	Released: 1957; Label: RCA Victor (# LPM-1403); Format: LP, CD	—	—
1958	Julie Andrews Sings	Released: 1958; Label: RCA Victor (# LSP-1681); Format: LP, CD	—	—
1961	Broadway's Fair Julie	Released: 1961; Label: Columbia (#CS 8512); Format: LP, CD	—	—
1962	Don't Go in the Lion's Cage Tonight and Other Heartrending Ballads and Raucous Ditties	Released: 1962; Label: Columbia (#CL 1886); Format: LP, CD	—	—
1967	A Christmas Treasure	Released: 1967; Label: RCA Victor (# LSP-3829); Format: LP, CD	— (Note: A Christmas Treasure was not eligible to appear on the Billboard 200 because it is a christmas album, and was instead featured on the Christmas LP's chart, peaking at #9.)	—
1969	Julie Andrews / Henry Mancini Perform Music from the Film Score Darling Lili	Released: 1969; Label: RCA Victor (#LSPX-1000); Format: LP, CD	113	—
1975	The Secret of Christmas	Released: 1975; Label: Embassy (#EMB 31237); Format: LP, CD	—	—
1982	Love Me Tender	Released: 1982; Label: Bainbridge Records (#BT 6260); Format: LP, CD	—	63
1987	Love, Julie	Released: 1987; Label: USA Music Group (#USALP-539); Format: LP, CD	—	—
1990	The Sounds of Christmas from Around the World	Released: 1990; Label: Hallmark (#620XPR9705); Format: CD	—	—
1994	Broadway: The Music of Richard Rodgers	Released: 1994; Label: Philips (#442 603–2); Format: CD	—	—
1996	Broadway: Here I'll Stay — The Words of Alan Jay Lerner	Released: 1996; Label: Philips (#446 219–2); Format: CD	—	—
"—" denotes items which were not released in that country or failed to chart.

=== Live albums ===
Year	Title	Album details
1977	An Evening with Julie Andrews	Released: 1977; Label: RCA (#SX-281); Format: LP

=== Soundtracks ===
Year	Title	Album details	Peak chart positions		Certification
Year	Title	Album details	US	UK	Certification
1956	High Tor	Released: 1956; Label: Decca (#DL 8272); Format: LP, CD	—	—	
1964	Mary Poppins	Released: 1964; Label: Buena Vista Records (#BVS-4026); Format: LP, CD	1	2	RIAA: Gold; BPI: Gold
1965	The Sound of Music	Released: 1965; Label: RCA Victor (#LSOD-2005); Format: LP, CD	1	1	RIAA: Gold; BPI: 8× Platinum
1967	Thoroughly Modern Millie	Released: 1967; Label: Columbia Masterworks (#OL 5190); Format: LP, CD	16	9	RIAA: Gold
1968	Star!	Released: 1968; Label: 20th Century Fox Records (#DTCS 5102); Format: LP, CD	98	36	
1976	The Pink Panther Strikes Again	Released: 1976; Label: United Artists Records (#UA-LA694-G); Format: LP, CD	—	—	
1979	10	Released: 1979; Label: Warner Brothers (#BSK 3399); Format: LP, CD	80	—	
1982	Victor/Victoria	Released: 1982; Label: MGM Records (#MG-1-5407); Format: LP, CD	174	—	
2000	Relative Values	Released: 2000; Label: Silva Screen (#FILMCD 337); Format: CD	—	—	
2004	The Princess Diaries 2: Royal Engagement	Released: 2004; Label: Walt Disney (#61192-7); Format: CD	15	—	RIAA: Gold
2017	Julie's Greenroom	Released: 2017; Label: Varèse Sarabande (#030206748789); Format: CD	—	—	
"—" denotes items which were not released in that country or failed to chart.

=== Cast recordings ===
Year	Title	Album details	Peak chart positions		Certifications
Year	Title	Album details	US	UK	Certifications
1954	The Boy Friend	Released: 1954; Label: RCA Victor (#LOC-1018); Format: LP, CD	—	—	
1956	My Fair Lady (Broadway cast recording)	Released: 1956; Label: Columbia Masterworks (#OL 5090); Format: LP, CD	1	1	RIAA: Gold
1958	Rose-Marie	Released: 1958; Label: RCA Victor (#LOP-1001); Format: LP, CD	—	—	
1957	Cinderella	Released: 1957; Label: Columbia Masterworks (#OL 5190); Format: LP, CD	15	—	
1959	My Fair Lady (London cast recording) (Note: The musical was transferred to London in April 1958, and the renewed success sent Andrews, Harrison, and the London cast to the recording studio in 1959 to capture the score in stereo: the London cast recording shares all the same principals as the Broadway cast.)	Released: 1959; Label: Columbia Masterworks (#OS 2015); Format: LP, LP, CD	—	—	RIAA: 3× Platinum
1960	Camelot	Released: 1960; Label: Columbia Masterworks (#OS 2031); Format: LP, CD	1	10	RIAA: Gold
1962	Julie and Carol at Carnegie Hall	Released: 1962; Label: Columbia Masterworks (#OS 2240); Format: LP	85	—	
1971	Julie and Carol at Lincoln Center	Released: 1971; Label: Columbia Masterworks (#S 31153); Format: LP	—	—	
1992	The King and I	Released: 1992; Label: Philips (#438 007–2); Format: CD	135	57	
1993	Putting It Together	Released: 1993; Label: RCA Victor (#09026-61729-2); Format: CD	—	—	
1995	Victor/Victoria: A New Musical Comedy	Released: 1995; Label: Philips (#446 919–2); Format: CD	—	—	
1998	Doctor Dolittle	Released: 1998; Label: First Night Records (#CASTCD 68); Format: CD	—	—	
1998	Hey, Mr. Producer!	Released: 1998; Label: First Night Records (#314 538 030–2); Format: CD	—	42	
1999	My Favourite Broadway: The Leading Ladies	Released: 1999; Label: TVT Soundtrax (#TVT 2010–2); Format: CD	—	—	
2000	My Favourite Broadway: The Love Songs	Released: 2000; Label: Hybrid Recordings (#HY-20020); Format: CD	—	—	
"—" denotes items which were not released in that country or failed to chart.

=== Compilations ===
Year	Title	Album details	Peak chart positions	
Year	Title	Album details	US	UK
1965	Firestone Presents Your Favorite Christmas Music Volume 4	Released: 1965; Label: Forrell & Thomas (#SLP 7011); Format: LP	—	—
1966	Firestone Presents Your Favorite Christmas Carols Volume 5 (Note: The album was recorded in the summer of 1966 and released in the same year by Firestone. The following year, RCA issued the album as A Christmas Treasure with two more songs in the track listing.)	Released: 1966; Label: Forrell & Thomas (#SLP-7012); Format: LP	—	—
1969	Christmas with Julie Andrews	Released: 1969; Label: RCA (#PRS-290); Format: LP	—	—
1970	A Little Bit in Love	Released: 1970; Label: Harmony (#H 30021); Format: LP	—	—
1972	The Best of Julie Andrews	Released: 1972; Label: Columbia (#KG 31970); Format: LP	—	—
1975	Julie Andrews	Released: 1975; Label: RCA (#ANL1-1098); Format: LP	—	—
1978	Julie Andrews Signature Album	Released: 1978; Label: Franklin Mint (#FM2001/2002); Format: 2xLP (Limited Edition)	—	—
1978	Songs for Christmas	Released: 1978; Label: Columbia (#P 14824); Format: LP	—	—
1988	A Little Bit of Broadway	Released: 1988; Label: Columbia (#CK 44375, DIDP-071184); Format: CD	—	—
1994	Julie Andrews Sings for You	Released: 1994; Label: Sony Music Entertainment; Format: Cassette (2 Volumes)	—	—
1996	The Best of Julie Andrews: Thoroughly Modern Julie	Released: 1996; Label: Sony (#R2 72281, A 26680, DIDP-089079); Format: CD	—	—
1996	The Sound of Julie Andrews: 22 Classic Songs	Released: 1996; Label: Sony (#A 26718); Format: CD	—	—
2001	Classic Julie, Classic Broadway	Released: 2001; Label: Decca; Format: CD	—	—
2005	Julie Andrews Selects Her Favourite Disney Songs	Released: 2005; Label: Walt Disney (#050086129171); Format: CD	—	—
2006	At Her Very Best	Released: 2006; Label: Universal Classics & Jazz (#9842693); Format: CD	—	70
2012	The CBS Television Specials	Released: 2012; Label: Masterworks Broadway (#88691939572); Format: CD	—	—
"—" denotes items which were not released in that country or failed to chart.

== Audiobooks and spoken word ==
Year	Title
1959	The Story Behind My Fair Lady as Told by the Original Cast
1965	Special Radio Programming Material: The Sound of Music
1965	Julie Andrews Introduces The Happiest Sound In All The World
1986	Mandy
1996	The Summer Friend: Special stories for special children
1999	Mother Goose & More: A collection of stories with music
2000	Little Bo
2003	Simeon's Gift
2004	The Little Gray Men
2008	Home: A Memoir of My Early Years
2009	Julie Andrews' Collection of Poems, Songs and Lullabies
2009	Julie Andrews' Collection of Poems, Songs and Lullabies
2012	Julie Andrews' Treasury for All Seasons: Poems and Songs to Celebrate the Year

== Singles ==
Title	Year	Peak chart positions			Certifications	Album
Title	Year	US	US AC	UK	Certifications	Album
"I Could Have Danced All Night"	1956	—	—	—		My Fair Lady (Broadway cast recording)
"Tom Pillibi"	1960	—	—	—		Non-album single
"A Spoonful of Sugar"	1964	—	—	—	BPI: Silver; RIAA: Gold	Mary Poppins (soundtrack)
"Supercalifragilisticexpialidocious"	1964	66	14	—	BPI: Silver; RIAA: Gold	Mary Poppins (soundtrack)
"Stay Awake"	1964	—	—	—	BPI: Silver	Mary Poppins (soundtrack)
"He Loves Me"	1964	—	—	—		Non-album single
"Chim Chim Cher-ee"	1965	—	—	—		Mary Poppins (soundtrack)
"Thoroughly Modern Millie"	1967	—	3	—		Thoroughly Modern Millie (soundtrack)
"Don't Go in the Lion's Cage Tonight"	1967	—	—	—		Don't Go in the Lion's Cage Tonight
"Star!"	1968	—	—	—		Star! (soundtrack)
"Whistling Away the Dark"	1970	—	—	—		Julie Andrews / Henry Mancini Perform Music from the Film Score Darling Lili
"Feed the Birds"	1973	—	—	—		Mary Poppins (soundtrack)
"It's Easy To Say" (Japan Only)	1980	—	—	—		10 (soundtrack)
"Le Jazz Hot!"	1982	—	—	—		Victor/Victoria (soundtrack)
"Love Me Tender"	1983	—	—	—		Love Me Tender
"Some Days Are Diamonds"	1983	—	—	—		Love Me Tender
"Getting to Know You"	1993	—	—	—		The King and I (cast recording)
"Living In The Shadows"	1996	—	—	—		Victor/Victoria (cast recording)
"—" denotes items which were not released in that country or failed to chart.
