= My Fair Lady (soundtrack) =

Soundtrack album
- Released: 1964
- Genre: Show tunes
- Label: Columbia Masterworks

Professional ratings
Review scores
Source	Rating
Billboard	positive ("Spotlight" pick)
AllMusic	(CD, 1994 reissue)

The original soundtrack to the 1964 film My Fair Lady was released by Columbia Records.

Billboard reviewed the album in its issue from 3 October 1964, writing: "A blockbuster! Cast is excellent. Performance is outstanding. Sound is great. This movie soundtrack album of the Warner Bros. picture "My Fair Lady," with Rex Harrison and Audrey Hepburn, with music supervised and conducted by Andre Previn, will sell and sell. Makes the ideal gift for Christmas or anytime. De luxe packaging with four-color photos on two pages in the center of the album. Columbia has the original Broadway show album and now the motion picture album. A pair of aces!"

The album peaked at number 6 on the U.S. Billboard Top LPs chart for two consecutive weeks in December 1964 and continued to sell well into 1965. It finished 1965 as the fourth-best-selling album of the year in the United States according to Billboard.

== Track listing ==
LP (Columbia KOL 8000, KOS 2600)

Side 1
No.	Title	Length
1.	"Overture"
2.	"Why Can't the English"
3.	"Wouldn't It Be Loverly"
4.	"I'm Just an Ordinary Man"
5.	"With a Little Bit of Luck"
6.	"Just You Wait"
7.	"The Rain in Spain"
8.	"I Could Have Danced All Night"

Side 2
No.	Title	Length
1.	"Ascot Gavotte"
2.	"On the Street Where You Live"
3.	"You Did It"
4.	"Show Me"
5.	"Get Me to the Church on Time"
6.	"A Hymn to Him"
7.	"Without You"
8.	"I've Grown Accustomed to Her Face"

== Charts ==
=== Weekly charts ===
Chart (1964–1965)	Peak position
West German Albums	19
UK Albums (OCC)	9
US Billboard Top LPs	6

=== Year-end charts ===
Chart (1965)	Position
US Billboard 200	4

== Certifications ==
Region	Certification	Certified units/sales
United States (RIAA)	Gold	500,000^{^}
^{^} Shipments figures based on certification alone.
