= The Best of Julie Andrews: Thoroughly Modern Julie =

Compilation album by Julie Andrews
- Released: 25 March 1996
- Recorded: 1956–1967
- Genre: Show tune, pop
- Label: Rhino

Julie Andrews chronology
Here I'll Stay (1996)	The Best of Julie Andrews: Thoroughly Modern Julie (1996)	Doctor Dolittle (1998)

The Best of Julie Andrews: Thoroughly Modern Julie is a compilation album by English singer and actress Julie Andrews, released by Rhino Records in 1996. The collection includes 19 tracks recorded between 1956 and 1967, encompassing highlights from Andrews' Broadway, film, and studio recording career. The selections draw from her work with multiple labels such as RCA Victor, Columbia, Decca and Buena Vista, and feature songs from her most iconic roles, including My Fair Lady, The Sound of Music, and Mary Poppins. Due to licensing restrictions, later material such as Victor/Victoria, released by MGM Records, was excluded. The title references her 1967 film Thoroughly Modern Millie, directed by George Roy Hil.

Remastered and issued on compact disc (CD), the compilation was praised for its sound quality and detailed liner notes, which include archival photographs and commentary on each track. Critics generally viewed the album as a well-curated retrospective of Andrews' peak years, while other lamented the absence of post-1967 recordings.

== Album details ==
The Best of Julie Andrews: Thoroughly Modern Julie features 19 tracks spanning Andrews' career from 1956 to 1967, sourced from Broadway cast recordings, film soundtracks, and solo studio albums. During this period, the artist was signed to four different record labels: RCA Victor, Columbia, Decca and Buena Vista. Due to licensing restrictions, the album excludes material from her later works, including Victor/Victoria, which was released by MGM Records. The album's subtitle references Andrew's 1967 film Thoroughly Modern Millie, directed by George Roy Hill.

The album primarily draws from Andrews' work in musical theater and film adaptations, omitting her later stage performances and non-soundtrack recordings. The selection features her collaborations with composers like Lerner and Loewe (My Fair Lady, Camelot) and the Sherman Brothers (Mary Poppins) and Andrews' most well-known roles, such as "I Could Have Danced All Night" and "Wouldn't It Be Loverly" from My Fair Lady, "The Sound of Music" and "My Favorite Things" from the 1965 film The Sound of Music, and "Supercalifragilisticexpialidocious" from Mary Poppins. Lesser-known selections include "We'll Gather Lilacs in the Spring" from Perchance to Dream (recorded for her Julie Andrews Sings album) and "Big D", a duet with Carol Burnett from a 1962 television special titled Julie and Carol at Carnegie Hall.

The album was remastered by Rhino Records, and the CD release included liner notes with background information on the tracks, as well as archival photographs. Critics noted the absence of post-1967 material but acknowledged the compilation's focus on Andrews' peak commercial period.

== Critical reception ==
Professional ratings
Review scores
Source	Rating
AllMusic	5/5 stars
Entertainment Weekly	B
Los Angeles Times	2.5/5 stars
San Francisco Chronicle	5/5 stars

Robert Hilburn of the Los Angeles Times wrote that while devoted fans would appreciate the collection, some songs lost "its charm when separated from the context of the shows". He also pointed out the absence of later hits due to licensing issues. The Atlanta Journal-Constitution celebrated Andrews' "glassy, crystalline-voiced" performances, calling the album "Julie frozen in time", as well as her "puckish sense of humor" and effortless high notes.

Steven McDonald of AllMusic called the album a "typically excellent mastering job from Rhino" but lamented the lack of post-1967 material. Still, he acknowledged that "for the average Julie Andrews fan, there's nothing here to disagree with, and a lot to be delighted about". Entertainment Weekly described Andrews as "a traditionalist in a world of calculated emotionalism". The San Francisco Chronicle praised its timing as Andrews dazzled Broadway in Victor/Victoria. The reviewer called the compilation "simply supercalifragilisticexpialidocious".

== Track listing ==
The Best of Julie Andrews: Thoroughly Modern Julie
No.	Title	Writer(s)	Original album	Length
1.	"I Could Have Danced All Night"	Lerner, Loewe	My Fair Lady	3:31
2.	"Wouldn't It Be Loverly"	Lerner, Loewe	My Fair Lady	3:57
3.	"Show Me"	Lerner, Loewe	My Fair Lady	2:13
4.	"O the Days of the Kerry Dancing"	Molloy, Hugo Frey	The Lass with the Delicate Air	3:55
5.	"Falling in Love with Love"	Hart, Rodgers	Julie Andrews Sings	2:23
6.	"We'll Gather Lilacs in the Spring"	Novello	Julie Andrews Sings	2:53
7.	"Matelot"	Coward	Julie Andrews Sings	3:47
8.	"The Simple Joys of Maidenhood"	Lerner, Loewe	Camelot	3:02
9.	"What Do the Simple Folk Do"	Lerner, Loewe	Camelot	5:02
10.	"I Loved You Once in Silence"	Lerner, Loewe	Camelot	3:07
11.	"This Is New"	Gershwin, Weill	Broadway's Fair Julie	2:33
12.	"If Love Were All"	Coward	Broadway's Fair Julie	2:19
13.	"Baubles, Bangles and Beads"	Forrest, Wright	Broadway's Fair Julie	2:27
14.	"Big D"	Loesser	Julie and Carol at Carnegie Hall	4:01
15.	"Feed the Birds"	Sherman, Sherman	Mary Poppins	3:52
16.	"Supercalifragilisticexpialidocious"	Sherman, Sherman	Mary Poppins	2:03
17.	"Prelude/The Sound of Music"	Hammerstein, Rodgers	The Sound of Music	3:31
18.	"My Favorite Things"	Hammerstein, Rodgers	The Sound of Music	2:20
19.	"Prelude/Thoroughly Modern Millie"	Cahn, Van Heusen	Thoroughly Modern Millie	2:46

== Personnel ==
Adapted from the album's liner notes.

- Compilation: David Weiner
- Project Supervision: James Austin
- Creative Consultants: Ken Bloom, Tony Natelli, Will Friedwald
- Project Assistance: Ted Myers
- Discographical Annotation: Gary Peterson
- Licensing: Mark Pinkus, Steve Poltorak
- Remastering: Chris Clarke & Dan Hersch/DigiPrep
- Art Direction: Monster X
- Design: Julie Vlasak
- Inside Photos: Michael Ochs Archives
