= At Her Very Best =

Compilation album by Julie Andrews
- Released: 2006
- Genre: Show tune, pop
- Label: Universal Classics & Jazz

Julie Andrews chronology
Julie Andrews Selects Her Favourite Disney Songs (2005)	At Her Very Best (2006)	Julie's Greenroom (2017)

At Her Very Best is a compilation album by English singer and actress Julie Andrews, released in 2006 by Universal Classics & Jazz. The collection brings together 19 tracks sourced from four of Andrews' albums released during the 1990s: The King and I (cast recording, 1992), Broadway: The Music of Richard Rodgers (1994), Victor/Victoria (original cast recording, 1995) and Broadway: Here I'll Stay — The Words of Alan Jay Lerner (1996). Issued as a double CD set, the compilation showcases Andrews' interpretations of various classic songs from American musical theatre.

The first disc features selections such as "The Sound of Music", "Getting to Know You", and a suite from My Fair Lady, among others. Songs written by Oscar Hammerstein II and Richard Rodgers are prominently featured, alongside works by Alan Jay Lerner, Frederick Loewe, Leslie Bricusse, Henry Mancini, Frank Wildhorn, and Kurt Weill. The second disc continues with pieces like "Edelweiss", "I Whistle a Happy Tune", "My Funny Valentine", and a medley titled "A Waltz Carousel", highlighting compositions from well-known Broadway musicals.

Commercially, At Her Very Best appeared on the Official Albums Chart Top 100 in the United Kingdom, reaching number 70 during the week of 27 August to 2 September 2006. This marked Andrews' only compilation album to enter the UK charts and was her second solo album to do so; the first was Love Me Tender in 1982, which peaked at number 63. No singles were released from the compilation, and it did not chart outside of the United Kingdom.

The album features a track selection similar to that of the 2001 compilation Classic Julie, Classic Broadway, which brought together 15 tracks from the same four previously mentioned albums.

== Track listing ==
Disc 1
No.	Title	Writer(s)	Original Album	Length
1.	"The Sound of Music"	Oscar Hammerstein II, Richard Rodgers	The Music of Richard Rodgers	5:09
2.	"Getting to Know You"	Oscar Hammerstein II, Richard Rodgers	The King and I	4:43
3.	"My Fair Lady Suite: Overture / Wouldn't It Be Loverly / Let a Woman in Your Life / Just You Wait / Poor Professor Higgins / The Rain in Spain / You Did It / Show Me / I Could Have Danced All Night / I've Grown Accustomed to Her Face"	Alan Jay Lerner, Frederick Loewe	Here I'll Stay	12:27
4.	"I Wish I Were in Love Again"	Lorenz Hart, Richard Rodgers	The Music of Richard Rodgers	3:32
5.	"A Cockeyed Optimist"	Oscar Hammerstein II, Richard Rodgers	The Music of Richard Rodgers	4:26
6.	"Bewitched, Bothered and Bewildered"	Lorenz Hart, Richard Rodgers	The Music of Richard Rodgers	4:57
7.	"Hello, Young Lovers"	Oscar Hammerstein II, Richard Rodgers	The King and I	3:12
8.	"Crazy World"	Leslie Bricusse, Henry Mancini	Victor/Victoria	3:22
9.	"Living in the Shadows"	Leslie Bricusse, Frank Wildhorn	Victor/Victoria	3:31
10.	"Camelot Suite: Camelot / The Simple Joys of Maidenhood / How to Handle a Woman / If Ever I Would Leave You / What The Simple Folks Do / I Loved You Once In Silence / Guinevere / Camelot"	Alan Jay Lerner, Frederick Loewe	Here I'll Stay	9:11

Disc 2
No.	Title	Writer(s)	Original Album	Length
1.	"Edelweiss"	Oscar Hammerstein II, Richard Rodgers	The Music of Richard Rodgers	3:54
2.	"I Whistle a Happy Tune"	Oscar Hammerstein II, Richard Rodgers	The King and I	2:27
3.	"My Funny Valentine"	Lorenz Hart, Richard Rodgers	The Music of Richard Rodgers	3:32
4.	"Shall We Dance?"	Oscar Hammerstein II, Richard Rodgers	The King and I	4:25
5.	"I Have Dreamed"	Oscar Hammerstein II, Richard Rodgers	The Music of Richard Rodgers	4:36
6.	"On a Clear Day"	Burton Lane, Alan Jay Lerner	Here I'll Stay	3:37
7.	"Here I'll Stay"	Alan Jay Lerner, Kurt Weill	Here I'll Stay	4:23
8.	"If I Loved You"	Oscar Hammerstein II, Richard Rodgers	The Music of Richard Rodgers	3:59
9.	"A Waltz Carousel: The Carousel Waltz / Do I Hear a Waltz? / It's A Grand Night For Singing / A Wonderful Guy / Out of My Dreams / Oh What A Beautiful Morning / This Nearly Was Mine"	Oscar Hammerstein II, Richard Rodgers	The Music of Richard Rodgers	15:01

== Personnel ==
Credits adapted from AllMusic.

- Design by Stuart Wilson

== Charts ==
Weekly chart performance for At Her Very Best
Chart (2006)	Peak position
UK Albums (OCC)	70
