= Classic Julie, Classic Broadway =

Compilation album by Julie Andrews
- Released: 2001
- Recorded: 1992–1996
- Genre: Show tune, pop
- Label: Decca

Julie Andrews chronology
My Favourite Broadway: The Love Songs (2001)	Classic Julie, Classic Broadway (2001)	The Princess Diaries 2 (2004)

Classic Julie, Classic Broadway is a compilation album released in 2001 by English actress and singer Julie Andrews through Decca Records. The compilation bringing together recordings made by Julie Andrews during the 1990s, a period marked by her return to the studio to revisit Broadway repertoire. The album features interpretations of iconic roles as well as lesser-known songs, preserving the traditional orchestral style associated with the artist.

Critical reception was mixed, with some reviewers praising her vocal elegance and the quality of her interpretations, while others pointed to limitations in the arrangement choices and overall result. The compilation ultimately stands as a retrospective record of her final studio phase before her recording career was interrupted due the singer's irreversible vocal cord damage.

== Background and content ==
The collection draws material from four previously released projects recorded between 1992 and 1996, during Andrews' late-career resurgence as a recording artist under the Philips label. These include the studio cast recording of The King and I (1992), where Andrews portrayed Anna Leonowens, as well as two songwriter tribute albums: Broadway: The Music of Richard Rodgers (1994) and Broadway: Here I'll Stay — The Words of Alan Jay Lerner (1996). Additionally, selections from the original Broadway cast recording of Victor/Victoria (1995) were incorporated.

The compilation was assembled five years after Andrews' final studio recordings for the Broadway series, which was discontinued due to the singer's irreversible vocal cord damage. Prior to this, Andrews had announced plans to expand the series with tributes to composers such as George Gershwin, Stephen Sondheim, Irving Berlin, and Cole Porter.

Musically, the album features Andrews reinterpreting signature roles from My Fair Lady, Camelot, and The Sound of Music, alongside lesser-known Broadway material she had never previously recorded, such as "On a Clear Day" from On a Clear Day You Can See Forever and "A Cock-Eyed Optimist" from South Pacific. The arrangements predominantly adhere to traditional orchestral Broadway styles. The album excludes material from Andrews' earlier film soundtracks, such as Mary Poppins or The Sound of Music. (Note: The album does not feature any songs taken from The Sound of Music soundtrack, but it does include two songs from the original stage musical. These are recordings sourced from the 1996 album Broadway: Here I'll Stay — The Words of Alan Jay Lerner, "Edelweiss" and "The Sound of Music".)

== Critical reception ==
Professional ratings
Review scores
Source	Rating
AllMusic	4/5 stars

William Ruhlmann from AllMusic praised Andrews' "famous poise and precise intonation" as well as her "wonderful voice" even in her later years. He highlighted standout moments, such as her renditions of "On a Clear Day" and "A Cock-Eyed Optimist", while acknowledging occasional missteps like the overly bombastic orchestrations and unsuitable song choices (e.g., "Bewitched"). Ruhlmann's review struck a bittersweet tone, noting that the compilation seemed to capture the "best of Andrews' final recordings", making it a poignant listen for fans.

Christie Leo's review from New Straits Times was notably critical, describing the album as "overripe with orchestral bloat and portentous arrangements". While acknowledging Andrews' sincerity, Leo argued that her interpretations lacked the subtlety and nuance of the original versions, calling her a "hopelessly shallow interpreter". The review dismissed the collection as a "monumental ego trip" rather than a heartfelt tribute, concluding that listeners would be better off revisiting The Sound of Music soundtrack for Andrews at her best.

== Track listing ==
Classic Julie, Classic Broadway tracks
No.	Title	Writer(s)	Musical	Length
1.	"On a Clear Day"	Burton Lane, Alan Jay Lerner	On a Clear Day You Can See Forever	3:37
2.	"A Cock-Eyed Optimist"	Oscar Hammerstein II, Richard Rodgers	South Pacific	4:25
3.	"Hello Young Lovers"	O. Hammerstein II, R. Rodgers	The King and I	3:12
4.	"Here I'll Stay"	Alan Jay Lerner, Kurt Weill	Love Life	4:23
5.	"Overture / Wouldn't It Be Loverly / Let a Woman / Just You Wait / Poor Professor Higgins / The Rain in Spain / You Did It / Show Me / I Could Have Danced All Night / I've Grown Accustomed to His Face"	Alan Jay Lerner, Frederick Loewe	My Fair Lady	12:28
6.	"Getting to Know You"	Oscar Hammerstein II, Richard Rodgers	The King and I	5:07
7.	"Living in the Shadows"	Leslie Bricusse, Henry Mancini	Victor/Victoria	3:28
8.	"Bewitched"	R. Rodgers, Lorenz Hart	Pal Joey	4:55
9.	"I Have Dreamed"	O. Hammerstein II, R. Rodgers	The King and I	4:34
10.	"My Funny Valentine"	R. Rodgers, L. Hart	Babes in Arms	3:32
11.	"Camelot Suite: Camelot / The Simple Joys Of Maidenhood / How to Handle a Woman / If I Ever Would Leave You / What The Simple Folks Do / I Loved You Once In Silence / Guinevere / Camelot"	A. J. Lerner, F. Loewe	Camelot	9:09
12.	"Crazy World"	L. Bricusse, H. Mancini	Victor/Victoria	3:19
13.	"If I Loved You"	O. Hammerstein II, R. Rodgers	Carousel	3:58
14.	"Edelweiss"	O. Hammerstein II, R. Rodgers	The Sound of Music	3:51
15.	"The Sound of Music"	O. Hammerstein II, R. Rodgers	The Sound of Music	5:07

== Personnel ==
Credits adapted from the liner notes of Classic Julie, Classic Broadway.

- Art Direction and Design (Reissue) – Carla Leighton
- Compilation Producers – Brian Drutman, Denis McNamara
- Original Concept and Compilation – Bill Holland, Mark Wilkinson
- Cover Photo – CBS Photo Archive
- Creative Director – Penny Bennett
- Management – Steve Sauer
- CD Mastering – U.E. Nastasi
