= Broadway: Here I'll Stay — The Words of Alan Jay Lerner =

Here I'll Stay

Studio album by Julie Andrews
- Released: 1996
- Genre: Show tune
- Label: Philips

Julie Andrews chronology
Victor/Victoria (1995)	Here I'll Stay (1996)	The Best of Julie Andrews: Thoroughly Modern Julie (1996)

Here I'll Stay (official title including subtitle: Broadway: Here I'll Stay — The Words of Alan Jay Lerner) is the tenth studio album by English singer Julie Andrews. It was released in 1996 by Philips Records. The album was the second and final installment in Julie Andrews' Broadway-themed series, following Broadway: The Music of Richard Rodgers. Focused on Alan Jay Lerner's compositions, it features full suites from Brigadoon, Paint Your Wagon, My Fair Lady, and Camelot, with arrangements by Ian Fraser.

The recording includes orchestral and choral sections, as well as an unplugged segment with Andrews accompanied only by piano. Plans for further tributes to Gershwin, Sondheim, Berlin, and Porter were canceled due to Andrews' vocal cord issues. The album songs were later included in compilations like Classic Julie, Classic Broadway (2001) and At Her Very Best (2006).

The album earned a Grammy nomination for Best Traditional Pop Vocal Album in 1998. The album was praised for delivering a "wonderful listening experience" through its "crisp" production and "lively" music. Critics highlighted Julie Andrews' vocal performance, for the "low notes full of human warmth" and for performances that struck a perfect balance between "the actress, the singer, and the interpreter".

== Background and release ==
The album was the second (and last to date) in a series of Broadway-themed records that Philips proposed for the singer. The first one was The Music of Richard Rodgers, a tribute to Richard Rodgers, whom Andrews admires.

This second album features a repertoire centered on the compositions of Alan Jay Lerner, with songs from Brigadoon, Paint Your Wagon, My Fair Lady, and Camelot. The CD is structured into four suites, each based on a specific soundtrack, allowing the full performance of each song. The musical structure features instrumental segments interspersed with solo and choral singing. There is also an unplugged section, in which Julie Andrews performs some songs accompanied only by piano, including a recording made in London. The arrangements were created by Ian Fraser, who had worked with Julie since she was 24 years old. According to Andrews, the album includes all the people Lerner ever worked with, such as Kurt Weill, Frederick Loewe, and Leonard Bernstein".

As a promotional effort, the singer appeared in a record store, in October 1996, showcasing and speaking to the public about her new CD and the cast recording of the musical Victor/Victoria (1995). At that time, the singer mentioned that the upcoming albums in the Broadway series would include tributes to George Gershwin, Stephen Sondheim, Irving Berlin, and Cole Porter. However, due to a problem with her vocal cords, the artist was unable to sing again, and the project was abandoned. Two compilations featuring the best moments from the two released albums in the Broadway series, along with the cast recordings of The King and I (1992) and Victor/Victoria (1995), were released in 2001, under the title Classic Julie, Classic Broadway, and in 2006, At Her Very Best.

== Critical reception ==
Professional ratings
Review scores
Source	Rating
AllMusic	4.5/5 stars

Rodney Batdorf of AllMusic wrote "production is crisp, the music is lively and she sings with theatrical conviction, providing a wonderful listening experience for dedicated fans of Julie and showtunes".

The Billboard critic praised the album for Julie Andrews' "sure-handed appeal" and for presenting a selection of Lerner's lesser-known collaborations of "uncommon beauty", while also highlighting her "saucy turn" on one of the tracks.

Flávio Marinho of Jornal do Brasil praised the album for its innovative format, which offers suites of Lerner's soundtracks instead of simple medleys, resulting in arrangements described as "majestosos" (majestic). Julie Andrews' vocal evolution is also highlighted, with the singer demonstrating "graves cheios de calor humano" (low notes full of human warmth) and a performance that perfectly balances "a atriz, a cantora e a intérprete" (the actress, the singer, and the interpreter), especially in tracks like "My Love Is a Married Man".

== Accolades ==
The album was nominated for a Grammy Award for Best Traditional Pop Vocal Album at the 40th Grammy Awards, held in 1998. The other nominees in the category included Mothers & Daughters by Rosemary Clooney, Sondheim, etc. by Bernadette Peters, Film Noir by Carly Simon, and Tony Bennett for his album Tony Bennett on Holiday, the winner of the category.

Awards and nominations for Here I'll Stay
Year	Award	Category	Result	Ref.
1998	40th Grammy Awards	Best Traditional Pop Vocal Album	Nominated	

== Track listing ==
- All lyrics by Alan Jay Lerner

No.	Title	Writer(s)	Length
1.	"On a Clear Day"	Burton Lane	3:37
2.	"Brigadoon Suite: Brigadoon (Overture) / Almost Like Bein' in Love / Waitin' For My Dearie / The Heather on the Hill / Come To Me, Bend To Me / From This Day On"	Frederick Loewe	10:21
3.	"My Love Is a Married Man"	F. Loewe	6:12
4.	"Here I'll Stay"	Kurt Weill	4:23
5.	"Paint Your Wagon Suite: Paint Your Wagon / They Call the Wind Maria / I Talk To The Trees / Another Autumn"	F. Loewe	5:38
6.	"Someone on Your Side"	André Previn	2:59
7.	"One More Walk Aroun the Garden"	B. Lane	4:11
8.	"My Fair Lady Suite: Overture / Wouldn't It Be Loverly / Let a Woman in Your Life / Just You Wait / Poor Professor Higgins / The Rain in Spain / You Did It / Show Me / I Could Have Danced All Night / I've Grown Accustomed to Her Face"	F. Loewe	12:28
9.	"Take Care of This House"	Leonard Bernstein	3:55
10.	"What Did I Have That I Don't Have?"	B. Lane	4:19
11.	"Camelot Suite: Camelot / The Simple Joys of Maidenhood / How to Handle a Woman / If Ever I Would Leave You / What The Simple Folks Do / I Loved You Once In Silence / Guinevere / Camelot"	F. Loewe	9:09
12.	"There's Always One You Can't Forget"	Charles Strouse	3:44

== Personnel ==
Credits adapted from the liner notes of Here I'll Stay record.

- Chorus Master – John McCarthy
- Conductor, Arranged By, Other [Conceived By] – Ian Fraser
- Featuring – Ambrosian Singers, London Musicians Orchestra
- Producer – Jay David Saks
