= With a Little Bit of Luck =

Song from My Fair Lady

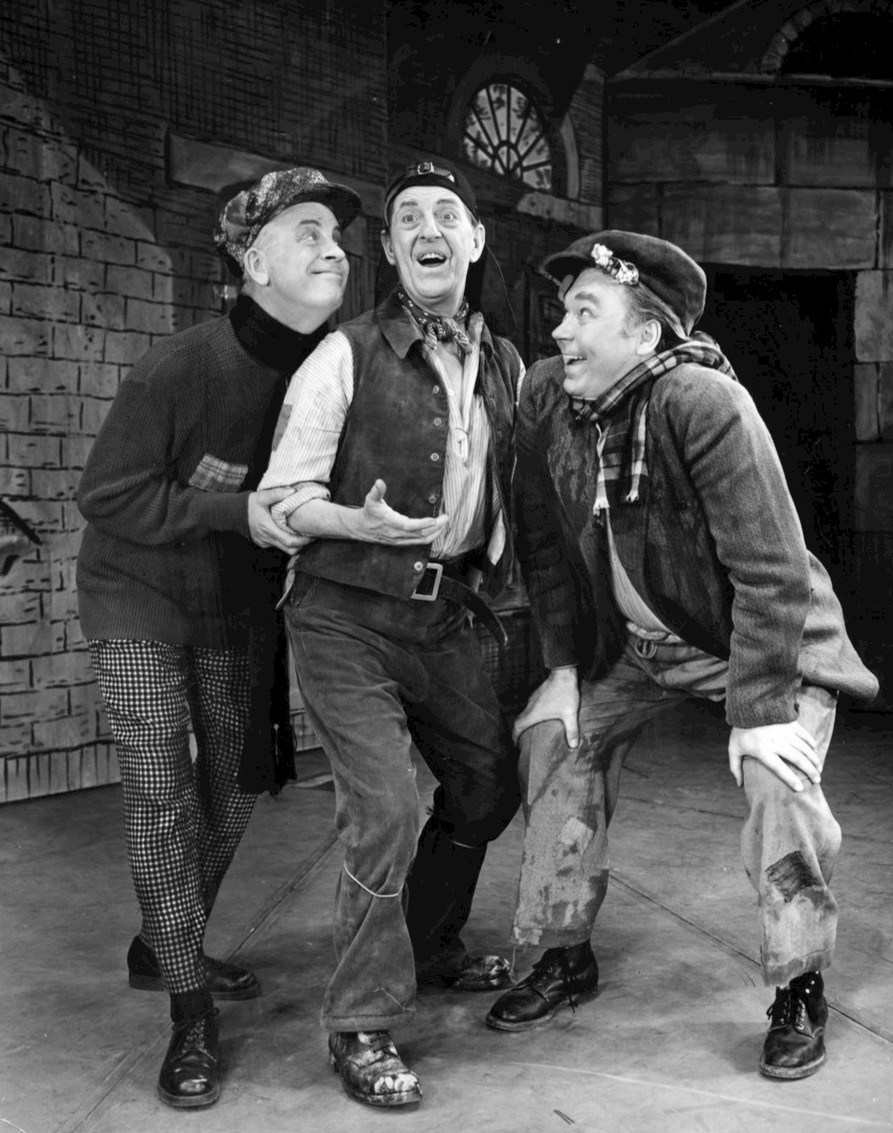
- Holloway as Doolittle (center), Dilworth as Harry (left), McLennan as Jamie (right) in "With a Little Bit of Luck" segment, 1957

Song
- Published: 1956
- Genre: Showtune
- Composer: Frederick Loewe
- Lyricist: Alan Jay Lerner

"With a Little Bit of Luck" is a popular song by Alan Jay Lerner and Frederick Loewe, written for the 1956 Broadway play My Fair Lady.

It was sung by Stanley Holloway as Alfred P. Doolittle in both the original stage and film versions.

It is sung by Eliza's bin man father, Alfred P. Doolittle and is about a list of everyday situations which one finds themselves in, and a desire to take the easy way out as "With a Little Bit of Luck" one's fate might change, thus avoiding any responsibility. The song is traditionally sung in a deep Cockney accent.

The song occurs twice at Act 1 in the musicals. Both "With a Little Bit of Luck" scenes are at the same tenement in Tottenham Court Road, London in 1912. Firstly, Alfred P. Doolittle sings along with bin men Harry and Jamie who are his drinking companions after the scene Eliza's "Wouldn't It Be Loverly?" and secondly (reprise), three days later, with new verses to hear of Eliza he sings along with all the common people there (ensemble) after Prof. Higgins' "I'm an Ordinary Man". However in the 1964 film version, this song occurred only after "I'm an Ordinary Man" and some verses were omitted.

When Alfred P. Doolittle sang the other of his two songs "Get Me to the Church on Time" (Act 2), he was not an impoverished workingman but rich middle-class owing to Higgins' recommendation to an American millionaire, although Doolittle was a man who didn't want "middle-class morality". Clearly, "With a Little Bit of Luck" and "Get Me to the Church on Time" are related and similar to each other as music hall-style songs.

== Recordings in 1956 ==
In 1956, Jo Stafford released a cover version of "With a Little Bit of Luck". On Billboard's review, she scored 78 out of 100 points and the review said: "Stafford's reading of the “Fair Lady” tune sparkles with style and verve. A fine side for deejays."

To accept the requests from customers and radio stations, Columbia Records released "The Rain in Spain" backed with "With a Little Bit of Luck" in 1956 (Columbia 4-40696) from Percy Faith's My Fair Lady album (Columbia CL-895) as an instrumental single record of My Fair Lady music. Both of Faith's tunes were the first single versions. When the original cast album already sold more than 250,000 copies, Billboard anticipated the dollar volume from non original music including Faith's "The Rain in Spain" and "With a Little Bit of Luck". Billboard's review scored his "With a Little Bit of Luck" 76 out of 100 points and described: "Another excellent Faith treatment of another tune from the “My Fair Lady” score. This one's a catchy little ditty with a folksy, lilting tempo."

== Various usage ==
In the US, the TV crime drama Magnum, P.I. season 6 episode 19 entitled "A Little Bit of Luck... a Little Bit of Grief" was named after "With a Little Bit of Luck".

In Netherlands, the TV situation comedy Zeg 'ns Aaa's soundtrack "Liefde op het eerste gezicht" was based on "With a Little Bit of Luck".

South Fremantle, an Australian Rules club in the WAFL, bases its club song on this tune.

In Japan, "With a Little Bit of Luck" was adopted as the commercial song for an energy drink ZENA featuring George Tokoro singing the changed phrase "Fine by ZENA" (Japanese: ゼナで元気, Hepburn: Zena de genki), launched in the mid-1990s. On horse racing in Japan, Sonoda and Himeji racecourses have used Percy Faith's "With a Little Bit of Luck" and a disco style tune "Summer Place '76" (from the film A Summer Place, 1959) in their betting booths as BGM a few minutes before the end of the tickets sales of every races. The usage of these two Faith's tunes in Sonoda racecourse was referred in a horse racing web novel that appeared serially in a daily sports newspaper Tokyo Sports news site in 2014, as tunes that were popular among middle-aged men in Sonoda racecourse.

Sometimes My Fair Lady music is used for figure skating programs. The US ice dance team Meryl Davis & Charlie White used it for their short dance during the 2013–14 figure skating season, including the Sochi Olympics where they were ranked #1. They studied the 1964 film of My Fair Lady. Davis said: "Our characters very much interact in a way that resembles Eliza Doolittle and Professor Higgins, but we've taken some liberties". White said: "The songs ("I Could Have Danced All Night" and "With a Little Bit of Luck") are recognizable and, obviously, there is singing. Meryl does such a great job of interpreting that, it sort of makes the program become more alive." Their version of "With a Little Bit of Luck" was some instrumental one and was played immediately in succession after "Get Me to the Church on Time" (instrumental) that started at the middle of their program, although their theme music "I Could Have Danced All Night" was with vocal version of 2001 London revival arranged. The other teams that used "With a Little Bit of Luck" were Marina Klimova & Sergei Ponomarenko during the 1989–90 season (free dance, instrumental), Ekaterina Riazanova & Ilia Tkachenko during the 2012–13 season (short dance, with vocal), and so forth.

A one-man show "With A Little Bit O' Luck" was written and performed by Dave Sealey who was known as a member of a "music hall" type duo Cosmotheka along with his brother Al Sealey and had a son Dan Sealey who is the former bass guitarist for Ocean Colour Scene. Dave Sealey performed Stanley Holloway in this one-man show bringing Holloway story vividly to life. The Sealey's show was released as the album entitled With A Little Bit O' Luck in 2007, including the song "With a Little Bit of Luck" at the end of the tracks. Also, Joseph Sirola known by more than 10,000 commercials and 600 TV shows has a one-man show entitled "With A Little Bit Of Luck".

== See also ==
- Black Cats, an Iranian band which sang this song in Iranian.
