= My Fair Lady (Broadway cast recording) =

Cast recording by the original Broadway cast
- Released: April 2, 1956
- Recorded: March 24, 1956
- Studios: Columbia 30th Street, New York City
- Genre: Show tunes
- Length: 53:44
- Label: Columbia Records

Julie Andrews chronology
| High Tor (1956) | My Fair Lady (1956) | Cinderella (1957) |

My Fair Lady is the original studio cast recording of the 1956 Broadway musical of the same name, released by Columbia Records (catalog #OL 5090). The musical is based on George Bernard Shaw's Pygmalion, with music by Frederick Loewe and lyrics and book by Alan Jay Lerner, and introduced songs like "I Could Have Danced All Night", "The Rain in Spain" and "On the Street Where You Live" to a global audience.

The album captures the performances of the original Broadway cast, including Rex Harrison, Julie Andrews, and Stanley Holloway, and was rushed to market to capitalize on the show's immediate success. Produced by Goddard Lieberson, it was recorded with the original cast and a full orchestra. in a single marathon session on March 25, 1956, at Columbia's 30th Street Studio in New York.

Commercially, it became Billboard's number one bestseller for fifteen weeks and spent a total of 480 weeks on the Billboard 200. Decades later, the album earnead inductions into the Grammy Hall of Fame (1977) and the Library of Congress National Recording Registry (2007).

== Background and recording ==
The original Broadway production of My Fair Lady opened on March 15, 1956, at the Mark Hellinger Theatre and became an instant sensation. CBS, Columbia Records' parent company, had invested between 360,000 and 400,000 in the show in exchange for ownership stakes and the rights to produce the cast recording. Goddard Lieberson, president of Columbia Records and a visionary advocate for musical theatre, spearheaded the project.

The album was recorded at Columbia's famed 30th Street Studio, a deconsecrated church known for its superb acoustics. The sessions took place in late March 1956, just over a week after the Broadway premiere, and were described as an intense, all-day affair. In the recording, most of the spoken dialogue was omitted and several songs underwent structural changes, including the removal of verses, reduction of instrumental sections, and the combination of musical numbers. For example, "Wouldn't It Be Loverly" had its spoken lines omitted and its dance break reduced; "With a Little Bit of Luck" combined both stage versions into a single number; "The Rain in Spain" featured reduced dialogue; "I've Grown Accustomed to Her Face" had the string section reduced to a solo violin in the first chorus; and the lyrics in "Get Me to the Church on Time" were altered, with "For Gawd’s sake" changed to "Be sure and get me".

Columbia's engineering team used a three-microphone setup, one for vocals, one for the orchestra, and one for ambient tone, to balance clarity with theatrical energy. Fred Plaut, Columbia's senior engineer, oversaw the final mastering, making adjustments for vinyl limitations. Lieberson's team edited and mastered the album, which shipped within days to meet 100,000 advance orders.

== Releases ==
The first LP was released on April 2, 1956, in mono sound by Columbia Masterworks. On October 17, 1988, it was released on compact disc (CD), coinciding with the increasing popularity of the compact disc (CD) format, as well as on cassette. In 1994, Sony Classical and Legacy released a new special edition "Gold CD" (#SK 66128) which includes a recording-studio conversation among the performers.

In 2002, the album was reissued by Sony Classical/Columbia/Legacy under catalog number SK 89997. The reissue was produced by Didier C. Deutsch and Darcy M. Proper, and the liner notes were authored by Dick Scanlan. This release also includes two brief conversations between Goddard Lieberson and the show's original creators and leading performers. According to Wayne Hoffman of Billboard, this edition was remastered with "astonishing clarity".

The LP was reissued in 2016 by Analog Spark, featuring replica of Columbia and RCA labels and packaging. This newly remastered, 180-gram deluxe audiophile vinyl edition presented the original mono recording, cutted directly from the original tapes by Ryan Smith at Sterling Sound.

== Critical reception ==
Professional ratings
Review scores
| Source | Rating |
|---|---|
| AllMusic | 3/5 stars |
| Cast Albums Reviews | 5/5 stars |

In his five-star review for Cast Album Reviews, Michael Portantiere described the recording as "stunningly well done" and said it "should be a cornerstone of every cast album collection". He also called "The Rain in Spain" "an electrifying moment of joyful triumph".

Writing for Musicals101.com, theatre writer John Kenrick described the Original 1956 Broadway Cast recording as "legendary", thanks to its definitive performances, and called the regular CD release "a keystone in any cast recording collection".

=== Accolades ===
This album was released before the Grammy Awards began in 1958, but it was later inducted into the Grammy Hall of Fame in 1977 and added to the Library of Congress' National Recording Registry in 2007.

== Commercial performance ==
The album debuted on April 28, 1956, at position number 30 and reached the number one spot on July 14, 1956. It remained on the Billboard 200 chart for a total of 480 weeks, making it one of the longest-charting albums in U.S. chart history. By 1994, it had the best performance of a cast recording album on Billboard charts.

According to Joe Whitburn's op Pop Albums 1955–2001 book, the album spent 292 weeks within the Billboard Top 40, 173 weeks in the Top 10, and a total of 15 weeks at number one. As a result of this sustained success, it was ranked as the 21st most successful album in the history of Billboard magazine. On the magazine's year-end album charts, it placed second in 1956 and secured the number one position in both 1957 and 1958.

The recording also made history by becoming the first LP record to sell one million copies in the United States. Its chart-topping performance was not limited to a single year, as it reached number one on the Billboard chart across multiple years: 1956, 1957, 1958, and 1959, accumulating a total of 15 weeks in the top position, including a stretch of eight consecutive weeks.

Following the London premiere of the musical in April 1958, the recording held the top spot on the UK Albums Chart for 19 consecutive weeks, making it the best-selling album in the United Kingdom for that year.

== Track listing ==
Side one
| No. | Title | Performed by | Length |
|---|---|---|---|
| 1. | "Overture" / "Why Can't the English?" | Rex Harrison, Robert Coote and Julie Andrews | 3:09 |
| 2. | "Wouldn't It Be Loverly?" | Julie Andrews and Ensemble | 3:55 |
| 3. | "With a Little Bit of Luck" | Stanley Holloway, Gordon Dilworth, Rod McLennan and Chorus | 3:55 |
| 4. | "I'm an Ordinary Man" | Rex Harrison | 4:38 |
| 5. | "Just You Wait" | Julie Andrews | 2:41 |
| 6. | "The Rain in Spain" | Rex Harrison, Julie Andrews, Robert Coote and Ensemble | 2:39 |
| 7. | "I Could Have Danced All Night" | Julie Andrews, Philippa Bevans and Ensemble | 3:28 |

Side two
| No. | Title | Performed by | Length |
|---|---|---|---|
| 1. | "Ascot Gavotte" | Chorus | 3:13 |
| 2. | "On the Street Where You Live" | John Michael King | 2:56 |
| 3. | "You Did It" | Rex Harrison, Robert Coote, Philippa Bevans and Ensemble | 4:25 |
| 4. | "Show Me" | Julie Andrews and John Michael King | 2:10 |
| 5. | "Get Me to the Church on Time" | Stanley Holloway, Gordon Dilworth, Rod McLennan and Chorus | 2:42 |
| 6. | "A Hymn to Him" | Rex Harrison | 3:28 |
| 7. | "Without You" | Julie Andrews | 2:01 |
| 8. | "I've Grown Accustomed to Her Face" | Rex Harrison | 5:14 |

== Personnel ==
Credits adapted from the liner notes of My Fair Lady record.

Cast

- Julie Andrews
- Rex Harrison
- Gordon Dilworth
- Michael King
- Robert Coote
- Rod McLennan
- Stanley Holloway

Production

- Arranged (dance music) by Trude Rittman
- Choreography (& musical numbers) by Hanya Holm
- Production staged by Moss Hart
- Presenter: Herman Levin
- Producer: Goddard Lieberson

Design

- Costume designer: Cecil Beaton
- Set designer (production design): Oliver Smith
- Illustration: Hirschfeld
- Liner notes: George B. Dale

Musicians

- Music by Frederick Loewe
- Lyrics by, adapted by (book) Alan Jay Lerner
- Music director: Franz Allers
- Orchestrated by Phil Lang, Robert Russell Bennett
- Ensemble (singing):
- Colleen O'Connor
- David Thomas
- Glenn Kezer
- Gloria Van Dorpe
- Gordon Ewing
- Herb Surface
- James Morris
- Lola Fisher
- Maribel Hammer
- Melisande Congdon
- Muriel Shaw
- Patti Spangler
- Paul Brown
- Reid Shelton
- Rosemary Gaines
- William Krach

== Charts ==
=== Weekly charts ===
Weekly chart performance for My Fair Lady
| Chart (1956) | Peak position |
|---|---|
| German Albums (Offizielle Top 100) | 6 |
| UK Albums Chart | 1 |
| U. S. (Cash Box Top 20 Selling Pop Albums) | 1 |
| U. S. (Billboard Best Selling Pop Albums) | 1 |

=== Year-end charts ===
| Chart (1956) | Position |
|---|---|
| US Billboard 200 | 2 |

| Chart (1957) | Position |
|---|---|
| US Billboard 200 | 1 |

| Chart (1958) | Position |
|---|---|
| US Billboard 200 | 1 |

== Certifications and sales ==
| Region | Certification | Certified units/sales |
|---|---|---|
| Australia (ARIA) | Gold | 250,000 |
| Canada | — | 250,000 |
| Germany (BVMI) | Gold | 125,000 |
| New Zealand (RMNZ) | Silver | 100,000 |
| Norway | — | 5,000 |
| United Kingdom | — | 750,000 |
| United States (RIAA) | Gold | 2,000,000 |
Summaries
| Worldwide as of 1970 | — | 8,000,000 |

== See also ==
- My Fair Lady (London cast recording)
