= My Favourite Broadway: The Love Songs =

Live album by Various artists
- Released: 27 February 2001
- Recorded: 16 October 2000
- Genres: Show tune, pop
- Label: Hybrid Recordings

Julie Andrews chronology
| Relative Values (2000) | My Favourite Broadway: The Love Songs (2001) | Classic Julie, Classic Broadway (2001) |

My Favourite Broadway: The Love Songs is a cast live album recorded during a special Broadway concert at New York's City Center in October 2000. The event brought together several notable Broadway performers, and the album was released on compact disc (CD) by Hybrid Recordings on February 27, 2001. The concert, recorded live under the musical direction of Paul Gemignani, was released on VHS and DVD by Image Entertainment.

The concert featured a variety of musical theater love songs, performed by an all-star lineup, and served as a benefit for Broadway Cares/Equity Fights AIDS. Critics highlighted the album's emotional and standout performances, praised its nostalgic and "magical" moments, but also noted that some tracks felt like pop versions that prioritized the performers over the songs.

== Background and release ==
The special Broadway concert My Favourite Broadway: The Love Songs, held at New York's City Center in October 2000, was a benefit event for Broadway Cares/Equity Fights AIDS. Julie Andrews served as host for the concert, introducing many of the acts and even performing a brief duet of "The Rain in Spain" with Michael Crawford. The show featured selections from a wide array of musical theater classics, with songs drawn from productions such as My Fair Lady, Funny Lady, The Music Man, West Side Story, Sweet Charity, Guys and Dolls, and Camelot. Featured performers included Bebe Neuwirth ("I'm a Brass Band"), Nathan Lane ("Sue Me"), Heather Headley ("He Touched Me"), Linda Eder ("What Kind of Fool Am I?"), Marin Mazzie ("What Did I Have That I Don’t Have?", "Not a Day Goes By"), Chita Rivera ("How Lucky Can You Get?"), Michael Crawford ("The Music of the Night"), and Peter Gallagher ("Too Late Now").

Some performers delivered one-time renditions of relatively obscure or underperformed songs from Broadway's past. For instance, Rebecca Luker performed "Too Late Now", a piece less commonly heard. Robert Goulet contributed "If Ever I Would Leave You", and Adam Pascal offered "Seasons of Love". Barry Manilow and Tom Wopat also made appearances, adding variety to the tracklist.

The CD was edited under the musical direction of Paul Gemignani. The entire project was recorded live, capturing audience reactions and stage interactions. A portion of the proceeds from CD sales supported AIDS-related charities and services.

In addition to the performances, the event highlighted the legacy of Broadway music and its impact. Julie Andrews's introduction and participation was seen as especially significant given her vocal limitations following past throat surgery.

== Critical reception ==
Professional ratings
Review scores
| Source | Rating |
|---|---|
| AllMusic | 4/5 stars |
| Entertainment Weekly | B− |

William Ruhlmann of AllMusic highlighted the emotional impact of the performances, noting that the moment when Julie Andrews sings a few bars of "The Rain in Spain" after her throat surgery "will bring a tear to the eye of any fan of musical theater". It concluded that this moment stands as "the highlight of an album that… features some wonderful performances".

Back Stage called the album "a new must-have CD for any musical theatre enthusiast's collection" and stated that listening to the album offers "a similar remembrance of the magic and wonder that classic composers and performers brought to the medium".The Hour wrote that "many of the cuts are strictly pop versions of show tunes that won't recall the contexts in which they were first heard", suggesting that they "seem designed to boost not the songs but their interpreters’ egos". However, the newspapper emphasized that these tracks should be "contrast[ed] with distinctive character-laden numbers by Marin Mazzie, Robert Goulet, Peter Gallagher and Chita Rivera".

== DVD release ==
The album was also released on VHS and DVD by Image Entertainment, with a runtime of 1 hour and 44 minutes, featuring highlights from the event. Regarding the DVD, John Kenrick of Musicals101.com wrote that "serious fans will enjoy wallowing in this showtune-fest".

== Track listing ==
| No. | Title | Writer(s) | Performer(s) | Length |
|---|---|---|---|---|
| 1. | "Introduction" | | Julie Andrews | 1:15 |
| 2. | "Lullaby of Broadway" (From 42nd Street) | Al Dubin, Harry Warren | Tom Wopat | 3:47 |
| 3. | "Sue Me" (From Guys and Dolls) | Frank Loesser | Nathan Lane | 2:41 |
| 4. | "He Touched Me" (From Drat! The Cat!) | Milton Schafer, Ira Levin | Heather Headley | 3:25 |
| 5. | "Gigi" (From Gigi) | Alan Jay Lerner, Frederick Loewe | Ron Raines | 5:38 |
| 6. | "When Did I Fall in Love?" (From Fiorello!) | Jerry Bock, Sheldon Harnick | Marin Mazzie | 3:43 |
| 7. | "If Ever I Would Leave You" (From Camelot) | Alan Jay Lerner, Frederick Loewe | Robert Goulet | 2:25 |
| 8. | "Love Song Medley I: Come Rain or Come Shine / I Don't Know How to Love Him / What Kind of Fool Am I?" (From St. Louis Woman / Jesus Christ Superstar / Stop the World – I Want to Get Off) | Harold Arlen, Johnny Mercer / Andrew Lloyd Webber, Tim Rice / Leslie Bricusse, Anthony Newley | Linda Eder | 4:54 |
| 9. | "Seasons of Love" (From Rent) | Jonathan Larson | Adam Pascal | 3:53 |
| 10. | "The Music of the Night" (From The Phantom of the Opera) | Andrew Lloyd Webber, Charles Hart, Richard Stilgoe | Michael Crawford | 5:40 |
| 11. | "Every Single Day" (From Harmony) | Barry Manilow, Bruce Sussman | Barry Manilow | 2:44 |
| 12. | "Love Song Medley II: Too Late Now / Sometimes a Day Goes By / Not a Day Goes By" (From Royal Wedding / Woman of the Year / Merrily We Roll Along) | Burton Lane, Alan Jay Lerner / John Kander, Fred Ebb / Stephen Sondheim | Rebecca Luker, Peter Gallagher, Marin Mazzie | 6:44 |
| 13. | "I'm a Brass Band" (From Sweet Charity) | Cy Coleman, Dorothy Fields | Bebe Neuwirth | 3:38 |
| 14. | "How Lucky Can You Get?" (From Funny Lady) | Fred Ebb, John Kander | Chita Rivera | 4:26 |
| 15. | "My Fair Lady Medley: I've Grown Accustomed to Her Face / The Rain in Spain" (From My Fair Lady) | Alan Jay Lerner, Frederick Loewe | Julie Andrews, Michael Crawford | 2:49 |
| 16. | "Finale: Lullaby of Broadway" (From 42nd Street) | Harry Warren, Al Dubin | Company | 1:38 |

== Personnel ==
Credits adapted from the liner notes of My Favorite Broadway - The Love Songs.

- Music director – Paul Gemignani
- Orchestra – The American Theater Orchestra
- Recorded live at City Center, New York City, on 16 October 2000
