= My Fair Lady (film) =

1964 American film by George Cukor

- Theatrical release poster by Bill Gold original illustration by Bob Peak
- Directed by: George Cukor
- Screenplay by: Alan Jay Lerner
- Based on: My Fair Lady by Alan Jay Lerner; Pygmalion by George Bernard Shaw
- Produced by: Jack L. Warner
- Starring: Audrey Hepburn; Rex Harrison; Stanley Holloway; Wilfrid Hyde-White; Gladys Cooper; Jeremy Brett; Theodore Bikel
- Cinematography: Harry Stradling
- Edited by: William H. Ziegler
- Music by: Frederick Loewe
- Production company: Warner Bros.
- Distributed by: Warner Bros. (Note: CBS gained the rights to the film in 1971. Paramount Pictures (through former parent company Viacom's acquisition of CBS in 2000) owned the overall film distribution rights until 2026 when CBS' parent Paramount Skydance merged with Warner Bros.' parent Warner Bros. Discovery to create Skydance Corporation, reuniting the film with its producer and distributor Warner Bros.)
- Release date: October 21, 1964
- Running time: 173 minutes
- Country: United States
- Language: English
- Budget: $17 million
- Box office: $72.7 million

My Fair Lady is a 1964 American musical comedy drama film adapted from Lerner and Loewe's 1956 stage musical based on George Bernard Shaw's 1913 stage play Pygmalion. With a screenplay by Alan Jay Lerner and directed by George Cukor, the film depicts a poor Cockney flower-seller named Eliza Doolittle who overhears phonetics scholar Henry Higgins casually wager that he could teach her to speak English so well she could pass for a duchess in Edwardian-era London, or (better yet, from Eliza's viewpoint) secure employment in a flower store. It stars Audrey Hepburn as Doolittle, replacing Julie Andrews from the stage musical, and Rex Harrison as Higgins, reprising his role from the stage, with Stanley Holloway, Gladys Cooper and Wilfrid Hyde-White in supporting roles.

A critical and commercial success, it became the second-highest-grossing film of 1964, after Mary Poppins, and won eight Academy Awards, including Best Picture, Best Director and Best Actor. The American Film Institute included the film as #91 in its 1998 AFI's 100 Years...100 Movies, as #12 in its 2002 AFI's 100 Years...100 Passions, and as #8 in its 2006 AFI's Greatest Movie Musicals. In 2018, the film was selected for preservation in the United States National Film Registry by the Library of Congress as being "culturally, historically, or aesthetically significant."

== Plot ==
In London, Professor Henry Higgins, a scholar of phonetics, believes that a person's accent determines their prospects in society ("Why Can't the English?"). At the Covent Garden fruit-and-vegetable market one evening, he listens to Eliza Doolittle, a young flower seller with a strong Cockney accent, and makes notes. This causes others to suspect he is a detective. Eliza protests that she has done nothing wrong and asks Colonel Pickering, himself a phonetics expert, to confirm this. Pickering and Higgins are delighted to become acquainted; in fact, Pickering had come from India just to meet Higgins. Higgins boasts he could teach even someone like Eliza to speak so well he could pass her off as a duchess at an embassy ball. Eliza wants to work in a flower shop, but her accent makes that impossible ("Wouldn't It Be Loverly"). The following morning, Eliza shows up at Higgins's home, seeking lessons. Pickering is intrigued and offers to cover all the attendant expenses if Higgins succeeds. Higgins agrees and describes how women ruin lives ("I'm an Ordinary Man").

Eliza's father, Alfred P. Doolittle, a dustman, learns of his daughter's new residence ("With a Little Bit of Luck"). He shows up at Higgins's house three days later, ostensibly to protect his daughter's virtue, but in reality to extract some money from Higgins, and is bought off with £5. Higgins is impressed by the man's honesty, his natural gift for language, and especially his brazen lack of morals. Higgins recommends Alfred to a wealthy American who is interested in morality.

Eliza endures Higgins's demanding teaching methods and harsh treatment ("Just You Wait"), while the servants feel both annoyed with the noise as well as pity for Higgins ("Servants' Chorus"). She makes no progress, but just as she, Higgins, and Pickering are about to give up, Eliza finally "gets it" ("The Rain in Spain"); she instantly begins to speak with an impeccable upper-class accent, and is overjoyed at Higgins having danced with her ("I Could Have Danced All Night").

As a trial run, Higgins takes her to Ascot Racecourse ("Ascot Gavotte"), where she makes a good impression initially, only to shock everyone by a sudden lapse into vulgar Cockney while cheering on a horse. Higgins is amused. There, she meets Freddy Eynsford-Hill, a young upper-class man who becomes infatuated with her ("On the Street Where You Live").

Higgins then takes Eliza to an embassy ball, where she dances with a foreign prince. Zoltan Karpathy, a Hungarian former pupil of Higgins, watches, listens, dances with Eliza, and finally declares she is a Hungarian princess.

Afterwards, Eliza's hard work is ignored, with all the praise going to Higgins ("You Did It"). This and his callous treatment of her, especially his indifference to her future, causes her to walk out on him, but not before she throws his slippers at him, leaving him mystified by her ingratitude ("Just You Wait [Reprise]"). Outside, Freddy is waiting ("On the Street Where You Live [Reprise]") and greets Eliza, who is irritated by him as all he does is talk ("Show Me"). She tries to return to her old life, but finds that she no longer fits in. She meets her father, who has been left a generous income by the wealthy American to whom Higgins had recommended him and is resigned to marrying Eliza's stepmother. Doolittle feels that Higgins has ruined him, lamenting that he is now bound by "middle-class morality" ("Get Me to the Church On Time"). Eliza eventually visits Higgins's mother, who is outraged at her son's behavior.

The next day, Higgins finds Eliza gone and searches for her ("A Hymn to Him"), eventually finding her at his mother's house. He attempts to talk her into coming back to him. He becomes angered when she announces that she is going to marry Freddy and become Karpathy's assistant ("Without You"). She says: “Goodbye, Professor Higgins. You shall not be seeing me again.” He goes home, predicting that she will come crawling back. However, he comes to the realization that she has become important to him ("I've Grown Accustomed to Her Face"). He turns on his gramophone and listens to her voice. Suddenly, she appears in the doorway, halting the recording. She says: “I washed my face and 'ands before I come, I did.” He nonchalantly replies, while slouching in his chair and tipping back his hat, "Eliza, where the devil are my slippers?" She simply smiles.

== Cast ==
- Audrey Hepburn as Eliza Doolittle
- Rex Harrison as Professor Henry Higgins
- Stanley Holloway as Alfred P. Doolittle
- Wilfrid Hyde-White as Colonel Hugh Pickering
- Gladys Cooper as Mrs. Higgins
- Jeremy Brett as Freddy Eynsford-Hill
- Theodore Bikel as Zoltan Karpathy
- Mona Washbourne as Mrs. Pearce, Higgins' housekeeper
- Isobel Elsom as Mrs. Eynsford-Hill
- John Holland as the Butler

Uncredited:

- John Alderson as Jamie
- Marjorie Bennett as Cockney with pipe
- Betty Blythe as Lady at the ball
- Walter Burke as Cockney bystander telling Eliza about Higgins taking notes about her
- Henry Daniell as the British ambassador (in his last film role)
- Charles Fredericks as George V in Eliza's fantasy
- Jack Greening as George, the bartender
- Lillian Kemble-Cooper as Female Ambassador (in yellow dress) at the ball
- Queenie Leonard as Cockney bystander
- Moyna Macgill as Lady Boxington
- Philo McCullough as Ball Guest
- John McLiam as Harry
- Alan Napier as Gentleman who escorts Eliza to the Queen of Transylvania
- Marni Nixon dubbed in as Eliza Doolittle's voice when singing
- Barbara Pepper as Doolittle's dancing partner
- Olive Reeves-Smith as Mrs. Hopkins
- Bina Rothschild as the Queen of Transylvania
- Bill Shirley dubbed in as Freddy Eynsford-Hill's voice when singing (his last film role)
- Grady Sutton as Ball Guest
- Ben Wright as Footman at the ball

== Musical numbers ==
1. "Overture" – played by orchestra
2. "Why Can't the English?" – performed by Rex Harrison, Wilfrid Hyde-White and Audrey Hepburn
3. "Wouldn't It Be Loverly?" – performed by Audrey Hepburn (dubbed by Marni Nixon) and chorus
4. "An Ordinary Man" – performed by Rex Harrison
5. "With a Little Bit of Luck" – performed by Stanley Holloway, John Alderson, John McLiam, and chorus
6. "Just You Wait" – sung by Audrey Hepburn (partially dubbed by Nixon) and Charles Fredericks
7. "Servants Chorus" – sung by Mona Washbourne and chorus
8. "The Rain in Spain" – performed by Rex Harrison, Wilfrid Hyde-White, and Audrey Hepburn (partially dubbed by Nixon)
9. "I Could Have Danced All Night" – performed by Audrey Hepburn (dubbed by Nixon), Mona Washbourne and chorus
10. "Ascot Gavotte" – sung by chorus
11. "Ascot Gavotte (Reprise)" – sung by chorus
12. "On the Street Where You Live" – sung by Jeremy Brett (dubbed by Bill Shirley)
13. "Intermission" – played by orchestra
14. "Transylvanian March" – played by orchestra
15. "Embassy Waltz" – played by orchestra
16. "You Did It" – performed by Rex Harrison, Wilfrid Hyde-White, and chorus
17. "Just You Wait (Reprise)" – sung by Audrey Hepburn
18. "On the Street Where You Live" (reprise) – sung by Jeremy Brett (dubbed by Shirley)
19. "Show Me" – performed by Audrey Hepburn (dubbed by Marni Nixon) and Jeremy Brett (dubbed by Shirley)
20. "Wouldn't It Be Loverly" (reprise) – performed by Audrey Hepburn (dubbed by Marni Nixon) and chorus
21. "Get Me to the Church on Time" – performed by Stanley Holloway, John Alderson, John McLiam, and chorus
22. "A Hymn to Him (Why Can't A Woman Be More Like a Man?)" – performed by Rex Harrison and Wilfrid Hyde-White
23. "Without You" – performed by Audrey Hepburn (dubbed by Nixon) and Rex Harrison
24. "I've Grown Accustomed to Her Face" – performed by Rex Harrison
25. "Finale" – played by orchestra

The partly-spoken delivery of the songs given by Harrison is a well-known example of sprechstimme.

== Production ==
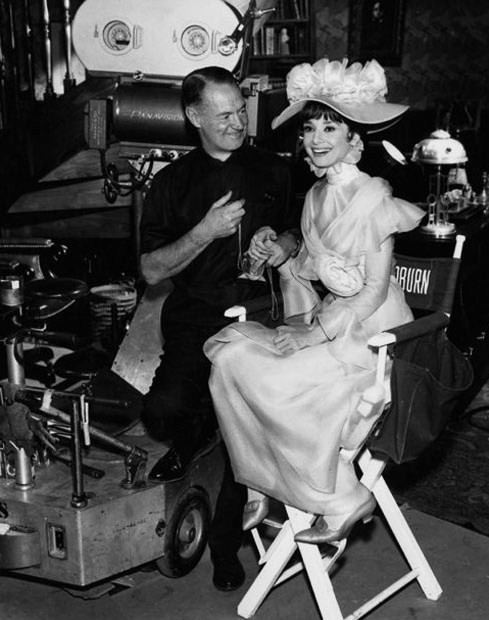
Cinematographer Harry Stradling and Audrey Hepburn as Eliza Doolittle on set of the film

CBS head William S. Paley made an arrangement where CBS would finance the original Broadway production in exchange for the rights to the cast album (through Columbia Records). Warner Bros. then purchased the film rights from CBS in February 1962 for the then-unprecedented sum of $5.5 million (equivalent to $59 million in 2025) plus 47.25% of the gross over $20 million. Paley added a condition to the Warner contract that ownership of the film negative would revert to CBS seven years following release.

In spite of her success playing Eliza Doolittle on Broadway, when Jack L. Warner acquired the film rights he replaced Julie Andrews (who had never been in film) in the role with Audrey Hepburn. Alan Jay Lerner broke the news to Andrews when she had moved to his production of Camelot: "I so wanted you to do it, Julie, but they wanted a name."

The entire movie was filmed at Warner Bros. Studios Burbank from August to December 1963. Principal filming took place on six stages of the studio, specifically 4, 7, 8, 11, 16, and 26. Though Hepburn was 34 years old during filming, in the movie she portrays a 21 year old Eliza.

With a production budget of $17 million, My Fair Lady was the most expensive film shot in the United States up to that time.

=== Order of musical numbers ===
The order of the songs in the Broadway show was followed faithfully with the exception of "With a Little Bit of Luck"; the song is listed as the third musical number in the play, but in the film it is the fourth. On stage, the song is split into two parts sung in two different scenes. Part of the song is sung by Doolittle and his cronies just after Eliza gives him part of her earnings, immediately before she goes to Higgins to ask for speech lessons. The second half of the song is sung by Doolittle just after he discovers that Eliza is now living with Higgins. In the film, the entire song is sung in one scene that takes place just after Higgins has sung "I'm an Ordinary Man." However, the song does have a dialogue scene (Doolittle's conversation with Eliza's landlady) between verses.

The instrumental "Busker Sequence", which opens the play immediately after the overture, is the only musical number from the play omitted in the film version. However, several measures from the piece may be heard when Eliza is in the rain, making her way through Covent Garden.

All of the songs in the film were performed in their entirety, except that some verses were omitted. For example, in the song "With a Little Bit of Luck", the verse "He does not have a tuppence in his pocket," which was sung with a chorus, was omitted because of its space and length; the original verse in "Show Me" was used instead.

The stanzas of "You Did It" that come after Higgins says "She is a princess" were originally written for the stage, but Harrison hated the lyrics and refused to perform the song unless the lyrics were omitted, as they were in most Broadway versions. However, when Cukor threatened to leave the production if the omitted lyrics were not restored for the film version, Harrison obliged. The omitted lyrics end with the words "Hungarian rhapsody" followed by the servants shouting "Bravo" three times, to the strains of Liszt's "Hungarian Rhapsody", before the servants sing "Congratulations, Professor Higgins."

=== Dubbing ===
During the autumn 1963 filming, the New York Times announced that "Miss Hepburn has a vocal coach and will do her own singing; the high notes may be dubbed." Hepburn's singing, however, was judged inadequate, and she was dubbed by Marni Nixon, who sang all songs except "Just You Wait", in which Hepburn's voice was preserved during the harsh-toned chorus, with Nixon on the melodic bridge section. Hepburn sang the brief reprise of the song in tears. Some of Hepburn's original vocal performances were released in the 1990s. Less well known is the fact that Jeremy Brett's songs (as Freddy) were dubbed by Bill Shirley.

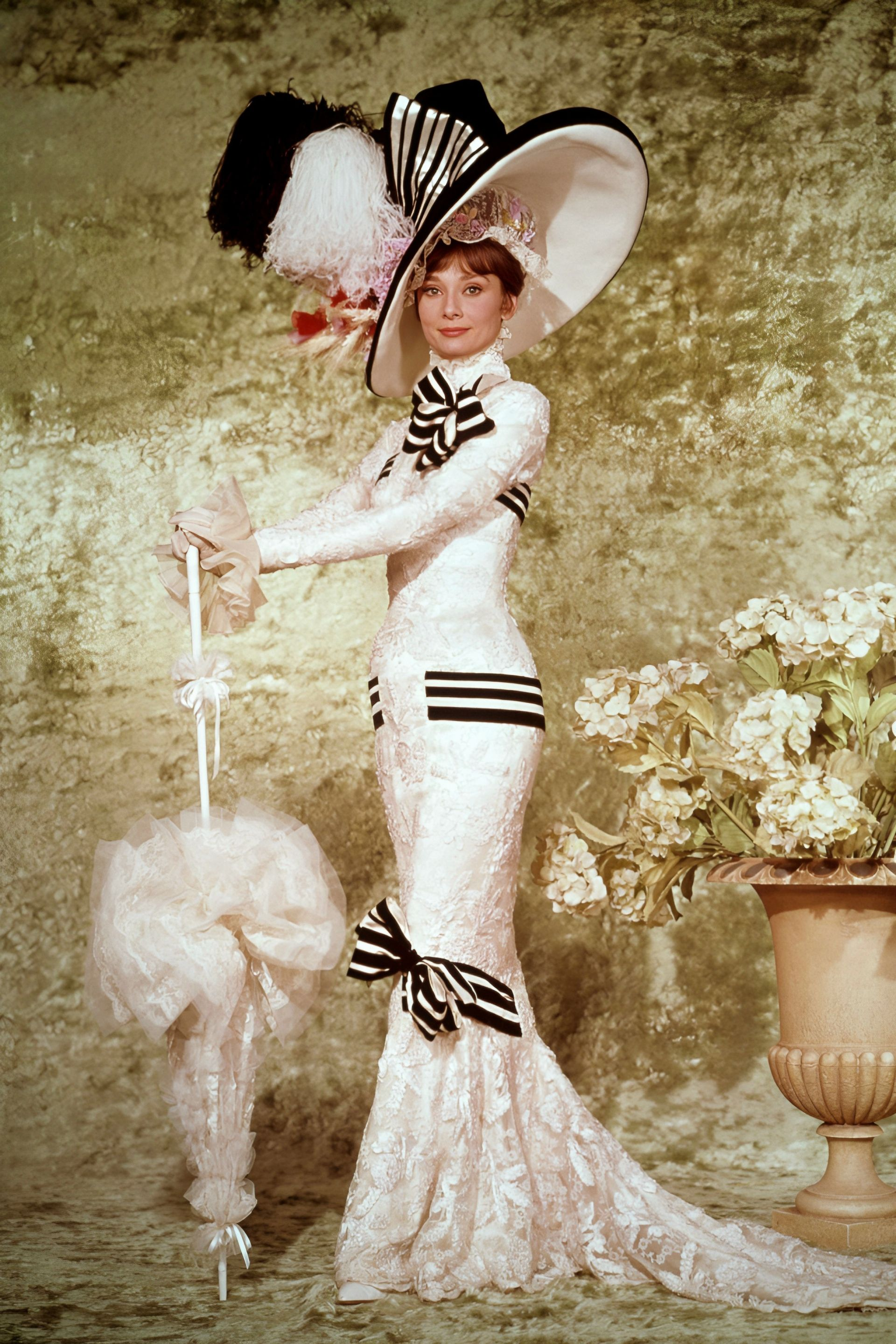
A publicity still of Hepburn wearing a costume designed by Cecil Beaton for the film

Harrison declined to prerecord his musical numbers, explaining that he had never talked his way through the songs the same way twice and thus could not convincingly lip-sync to a playback recording during filming (according to Jack L. Warner, dubbing had been commonplace for years, stating, "We even dubbed Rin Tin Tin."). George Groves equipped Harrison with a wireless microphone hidden in the knot of his necktie, the first such use during filming of a motion picture. The sound department earned an Academy Award for its efforts.

=== Intermission ===
One of the few differences in structure between the stage version and the film is the placement of the intermission. In the stage play, the intermission occurs after the embassy ball at which Eliza dances with Karpathy. In the film, the intermission comes before the ball as Eliza, Higgins and Pickering are seen departing for the embassy.

=== Art direction ===
Gene Allen, Cecil Beaton and George James Hopkins won an Academy Award for Best Production Design. Beaton's inspiration for Higgins' library was a room at the Château de Groussay, Montfort-l'Amaury, in France, which had been decorated opulently by its owner, Carlos de Beistegui. Hats were created by Parisian milliner Madame Paulette at Beaton's request.

== Release ==
The film had its premiere at the Criterion Theatre in New York on Wednesday, October 21, 1964, with its regular run starting the following day with a $500,000 advance. It ran for 87 weeks at the theatre.

=== Later releases ===
The film was re-released on January 21, 1971, at the Criterion and earned rentals of $2 million in the United States and Canada. Prior to the re-release, Warner Bros. claimed that the film had grossed over $100 million worldwide. Its gross in the United States and Canada after the re-release was an estimated $72 million. The rights to the film reverted to CBS from Warner Bros. after the re-release. By October 2026, the film have been reunited when CBS' parent Paramount Skydance had acquired Warner Bros. Discovery alongside its former distributor that produced and distributed the film, Warner Bros. Pictures, to form Skydance Corporation, bringing the film back with its former distributor Warner Bros. Pictures.

The film was restored in 1994 for its 30th anniversary by James C. Katz and Robert A. Harris, who had restored Spartacus three years earlier, at a cost of $700,000. The restoration was commissioned and financed by CBS, to which the film rights reverted from Warner Bros. in 1971. It premiered at the Toronto International Film Festival on September 10, 1994. At the end of the gala premiere, Marni Nixon introduced a version of "Wouldn't It Be Loverly" sung by Hepburn, reconstructed from outtakes. The restoration was to be released by 20th Century Fox in five cities prior to a video/laserdisc release in October 1994. CBS later hired Harris to lend his expertise to a new 4K restoration of the film for a 2015 Blu-ray release, working from 8K scans of the original camera negative and other surviving 65 mm elements.

In 2019, the film was given a limited theatrical re-release through Turner Classic Movies and Fathom Events on February 17 and 20 as part of TCM Big Screen Classics. In 2024, the film was given another limited theatrical re-release through Fathom Events on February 4 and 5 to celebrate its 60th anniversary.

=== Home media ===
A restored version of My Fair Lady was released on VHS and LaserDisc by CBS/Fox Video for its 30th anniversary in October 1994. A THX certified VHS release premiered two years later on October 1, 1996. It was released in Ultra HD Blu-ray on May 25, 2021, by CBS's sister company and existing rights holder, Paramount Home Entertainment. In March 2021, Paramount Home Entertainment also released My Fair Lady on a ten film Blu-ray set. The set featured nine other Paramount-owned films which won Academy Award for Best Picture, including an additional three titles which were originally released by other studios (DreamWorks Pictures and Miramax, respectively).

== Critical reception ==
=== Contemporary ===
Bosley Crowther of The New York Times opened his contemporary review: "As Henry Higgins might have whooped, 'By George, they've got it!' They've made a superlative film from the musical stage show My Fair Lady—a film that enchantingly conveys the rich endowments of the famous stage production in a fresh and flowing cinematic form." Philip K. Scheuer of the Los Angeles Times reported from the New York premiere that "when the curtains came together at the finish of just three hours, three hours of Technicolored entertainment, I heard myself all but echoing Col. Pickering's proud summation of Eliza Doolittle's performances as a duchess at the Embassy Ball, 'a total triumph.'"

Robert J. Landry of Variety wrote: "It has riches of story, humor, acting and production values far beyond the average big picture. It is Hollywood at its best, Jack L. Warner's career capstone and a film that will go on without now-forseeable [sic?] limits of playoff in reserved seat policy and world rentals."

The Monthly Film Bulletin of the UK declared that "with the range of talent, taste and sheer professionalism at work, from Shaw onwards, Warners could hardly have made a film which would do less than please most of the people most of the time. Their $17,000,000 investment looks as safe as houses." The review opined that Cukor directed with "great tact" but "a rather unnecessary circumspection. Scenes move at a steady, even pace, as though every word were worth its weight in gold (perhaps, in view of the price paid for the rights, it very nearly was). Especially, the decor tends to inhibit rather than release the film."

Brendan Gill of The New Yorker wrote that the film "has survived very nearly intact the always risky leap from stage to screen," adding, "Miss Hepburn isn't particularly convincing as a Cockney flower girl, but, having mastered her vowels and consonants in the 'rain in Spain' scene, she comes into her own." Richard L. Coe of The Washington Post also suggested that Hepburn's casting was the film's "basic flaw", describing her as "recognizably exquisite—but not 21—as the flower girl and to the later scenes she brings a real flirtatiousness quite un-Shavian." Nevertheless, Coe remarked that "there are some marvelous things which will make this a long-loved film," including Rex Harrison giving "one of the classic screen performances" that he correctly predicted was "an absolute certainty for next year's Oscars."

=== Retrospective ===
Chicago Sun-Times critic Roger Ebert gave the film four stars out of four, and, in 2006, he put it on his "Great Movies" list, praising Hepburn's performance, and calling the film "the best and most unlikely of musicals."

James Berardinelli wrote in a 2018 retrospective review, "Few genres of films are as magical as musicals, and few musicals are as intelligent and lively as My Fair Lady. It's a classic not because a group of stuffy film experts have labeled it as such, but because it has been, and always will be, a pure joy to experience."

Dave Whitaker of DavesMovieDatabase, a film aggregator site that combines other lists with box-office, ratings, and awards, listed My Fair Lady in 2020 as the 100th-greatest movie of all time, as the 9th-greatest musical of all time, and as the 30th-most-awarded movie of all time.

Some analysis of My Fair Lady has been more mixed, with disagreement between reviewers about whether the movie critiques or affirms misogynistic and classist tropes.

My Fair Lady holds a 95% approval rating on Rotten Tomatoes based on 91 reviews, with an average rating of 8.6/10. The consensus states: "George Cukor's elegant, colorful adaptation of the beloved stage play is elevated to new heights thanks to winning performances by Audrey Hepburn and Rex Harrison." On Metacritic, the film holds a weighted average score of 95 out of 100 based on 15 critics, indicating "universal acclaim".

=== Awards and nominations ===
| Award | Category | Nominee(s) | Result | Ref. |
|---|---|---|---|---|
| Academy Awards | Best Picture | Jack L. Warner | Won | |
| Academy Awards | Best Director | George Cukor | Won | |
| Academy Awards | Best Actor | Rex Harrison | Won | |
| Academy Awards | Best Supporting Actor | Stanley Holloway | Nominated | |
| Academy Awards | Best Supporting Actress | Gladys Cooper | Nominated | |
| Academy Awards | Best Screenplay – Based on Material from Another Medium | Alan Jay Lerner | Nominated | |
| Academy Awards | Best Art Direction – Color | Art Direction: Gene Allen and Cecil Beaton; Set Decoration: George James Hopkins | Won | |
| Academy Awards | Best Cinematography – Color | Harry Stradling | Won | |
| Academy Awards | Best Costume Design – Color | Cecil Beaton | Won | |
| Academy Awards | Best Film Editing | William Ziegler | Nominated | |
| Academy Awards | Best Scoring of Music – Adaptation or Treatment | André Previn | Won | |
| Academy Awards | Best Sound | George R. Groves | Won | |
| American Cinema Editors Awards | Best Edited Feature Film | William Ziegler | Nominated | |
| Boxoffice Magazine Awards | Best Picture of the Month for the Whole Family (December) | George Cukor | Won | |
| British Academy Film Awards | Best Film | George Cukor | Won | |
| British Academy Film Awards | Best British Actor | Rex Harrison | Nominated | |
| Cinema Writers Circle Awards | Best Foreign Film | | Won | |
| David di Donatello Awards | Best Foreign Manufacturer | Jack L. Warner | Won | |
| David di Donatello Awards | Best Foreign Actor | Rex Harrison | Won | |
| David di Donatello Awards | Best Foreign Actress | Audrey Hepburn | Won | |
| Directors Guild of America Awards | Outstanding Directorial Achievement in Motion Pictures | George Cukor | Won | |
| Golden Globe Awards | Best Motion Picture – Musical or Comedy | | Won | |
| Golden Globe Awards | Best Director – Motion Picture | George Cukor | Won | |
| Golden Globe Awards | Best Actor in a Motion Picture – Musical or Comedy | Rex Harrison | Won | |
| Golden Globe Awards | Best Actress in a Motion Picture – Musical or Comedy | Audrey Hepburn | Nominated | |
| Golden Globe Awards | Best Supporting Actor – Motion Picture | Stanley Holloway | Nominated | |
| Laurel Awards | Top Road Show | | Won | |
| Laurel Awards | Top Male Musical Performance | Rex Harrison | Won | |
| Laurel Awards | Top Female Musical Performance | Audrey Hepburn | Nominated | |
| Laurel Awards | Top Male Supporting Performance | Stanley Holloway | Nominated | |
| National Board of Review Awards | Top Ten Films | | 2nd Place | |
| National Film Preservation Board | National Film Registry | | Inducted | |
| New York Film Critics Circle Awards | Best Film | | Won | |
| New York Film Critics Circle Awards | Best Director | George Cukor | Nominated | |
| New York Film Critics Circle Awards | Best Actor | Rex Harrison | Won | |
| New York Film Critics Circle Awards | Best Actress | Audrey Hepburn | Nominated | |
| Online Film & Television Association Awards | Film Hall of Fame: Productions | | Inducted | |
| Writers Guild of America Awards | Best Written American Musical | Alan Jay Lerner | Nominated | |

== Soundtrack ==
Original Columbia Records LP

All tracks played by the Warner Bros. Studio Orchestra conducted by André Previn. Between brackets the singers.

1. "Overture"
2. "Why Can't the English Learn to Speak?" (Rex Harrison, Audrey Hepburn, Wilfrid Hyde-White)
3. "Wouldn't It Be Loverly?" (Marni Nixon (for Hepburn))
4. "I'm an Ordinary Man" (Harrison)
5. "With a Little Bit of Luck" (Stanley Holloway)
6. "Just You Wait" (Hepburn, Nixon)
7. "The Rain in Spain" (Harrison, Hepburn, Nixon, Hyde-White)
8. "I Could Have Danced All Night" (Nixon, Hepburn (one line))
9. "Ascot Gavotte"
10. "On the Street Where You Live" (Bill Shirley (for Jeremy Brett))
11. "You Did It" (Harrison, Hyde-White) (without the choir "Congratulations")
12. "Show Me" (Nixon, Shirley)
13. "Get Me to the Church on Time" (Holloway)
14. "A Hymn to Him (Why Can't a Woman Be More Like a Man?)" (Harrison, Hyde-White)
15. "Without You" (Nixon, Harrison)
16. "I've Grown Accustomed to Her Face" (Harrison)

Previously unreleased on LP, though included on the CD

1. "The Flower Market"
2. "Servants' Chorus"
3. "Ascot Gavotte (Reprise)"
4. "Intermission"
5. "The Transylvanian March"
6. "The Embassy Waltz"
7. "You Did It" (Harrison, Hyde-White) (with the servant's final choir "Congratulations")
8. "Just You Wait (Reprise)" (Audrey Hepburn)
9. "On the Street Where You Live (Reprise)" (Shirley)
10. "The Flowermarket" (containing the reprise of "Wouldn't It Be Loverly?") (Nixon)
11. "End Titles"
12. "Exit Music"

=== Certifications ===
| Region | Certification | Certified units/sales |
|---|---|---|
| Netherlands | — | 25,000 |
| Norway | — | 14,000 |
| South Africa | — | 100,000 |
| United Kingdom | — | 180,000 |
| United Kingdom (BPI) Studio Cast Recording | Gold | 100,000^{^} |
| United States (RIAA) Original Cast | 3× Platinum | 3,000,000^{^} |
| United States (RIAA) | Gold | 500,000^{^} |
Summaries
| Scandinavia | — | 90,000 |
| Worldwide sales up to 1966 | — | 6,000,000 |
^{^} Shipments figures based on certification alone.

== See also ==
- List of American films of 1964

== Bibliography ==
- Lees, Gene (2005). The Musical Worlds of Lerner and Loewe. Bison Books. ISBN 978-0-8032-8040-3.
- Green, Benny, ed. (1987). A Hymn to Him: The Lyrics of Alan Jay Lerner. Hal Leonard Corporation. ISBN 0-87910-109-1.
- Lerner, Alan Jay (1985). The Street Where I Live. Da Capo Press. ISBN 0-306-80602-9.
