= Julie's Greenroom (soundtrack) =

Soundtrack album by Julie Andrews
- Released: 5 May 2017
- Genre: Children's music, pop
- Label: Varèse Sarabande

Julie Andrews chronology
At Her Very Best (2006)	Julie's Greenroom (2017)

Julie's Greenroom is the soundtrack album for the children's television series of the same name, starring Julie Andrews. The soundtrack was released digitally by Varèse Sarabande on April 14, 2017, and on CD on May 5, 2017. The album features performances by Julie Andrews, Giullian Yao Gioiello, and several guest stars, including Alec Baldwin, Carol Burnett, Ellie Kemper, Tituss Burgess, and David Hyde Pierce. The original score was composed by Ryan Shore.

The show, produced by The Jim Henson Company, focuses on teaching preschoolers about different aspects of the performing arts, using a mix of live-action, puppetry, and musical elements. All of the puppet characters, known as the Greenies, are guided by Julie Andrews' character, Miss Julie, and her assistant Gus, played by Giullian Yao Gioiello. Guest stars appear in various episodes, teaching lessons and often performing songs specifically crafted for the show.

The soundtrack consists of 27 tracks that blend original songs with instrumental pieces. Some songs were performed by the human cast alongside the Greenies' puppeteers, while others are purely instrumental to support storytelling moments in the show. Throughout the series, music is used not only for entertainment but also to reinforce educational themes related to acting, singing, dancing, and other performing arts disciplines.

== Background ==
Julie's Greenroom is an educational series designed to introduce preschoolers to the performing arts through a creative curriculum crafted by The Jim Henson Company and executive producer Julie Andrews. The concept was inspired by the long legacy of educational puppet shows like Sesame Street and The Muppet Show, with the Greenies being a new generation of Muppet-style characters. Each episode of the 13-episode series features a specific topic, such as acting, singing, or improvisation, paired with a musical number to help reinforce the lesson. The album's score was composed by Ryan Shore, who brought an energetic and whimsical touch to the soundtrack, blending traditional musical theater sounds with playful children's melodies.

Julie Andrews, despite losing her original singing voice following vocal surgery in 1997, participated in singing on the album, with much of the vocal heavy lifting carried out by Giullian Yao Gioiello. Following the series' release, it became available on digital platforms, and physical copies were distributed via Varèse Sarabande.

== Production and recording ==
The soundtrack was produced alongside the production of Julie's Greenroom itself by The Jim Henson Company, with Julie Andrews serving as executive producer alongside Emma Walton Hamilton, Steve Sauer, Lisa Henson, and Halle Stanford. Joey Mazzarino, a veteran writer and actor, co-produced and directed episodes, while Tom Keniston and Bill Sherman contributed as producers and music supervisors respectively. Shore's score and the original songs were developed closely with the show's writing team to ensure musical numbers fit seamlessly into the narrative and educational goals.

The recording process for the soundtrack was intended to match the live, organic feel of the show, with emphasis on accessibility and relatability for the young audience. Care was taken to avoid overproduction. Several guest stars were involved in the recording sessions, often performing alongside Julie Andrews and Giullian Yao Gioiello. Puppeteers voicing the Greenies also contributed musically.

== Songs and lyrics ==
The soundtrack features a wide variety of songs covering different artistic disciplines, such as acting, singing, painting, and improvisation. Each song is integrated into the storyline of an episode, often used to motivate the Greenies or illustrate a key lesson. Tracks like "Mash-Up (Theme Song)" and "Anything Can Happen in the Theater" serve as the musical anchors of the show, recurring throughout the series in different versions and reprises. Some songs highlight individual performances, like Idina Menzel's "I Know That You'll Get There Somehow" and Chris Colfer's contribution to "Let Your Voice Be Heard". Others are ensemble pieces that feature the whole cast, such as "You Gotta Bring the Wow" and "Take a Leap", which emphasize collaboration and creativity. The final songs, "Anything Can Happen in the Theater (Part 2)" and "Mash-Up (Reprise Finale)", bring together the themes of the season, celebrating the Greenies' completed musical production.

In addition to vocal numbers, the soundtrack includes several instrumental tracks that reflect moments of drama, humor, or reflection within the series. Examples include "Runaway Cart", "Costume Workshop", and "Fizz Breaks Joshua's Violin", each representing specific narrative moments.

== Critical reception ==
In his review for The Reviews Hub, Mark Clegg wrote that the soundtrack "sadly doesn't quite hit the mark", noting that many instrumental tracks are "generally short and rather dull" and that several songs become "repetitive, overly simple". He concluded that the album appears "simply be a massive cash grab", summarizing his assessment as "Far from practically perfect".

Tall Writer of Seattle Post-Intelligencer stated that "the Broadway songs blend well with the original songs, as all showcase the show's singing, performing, dancing, and artwork". He also recommended the album, stating that it "resonates beyond the short running times", which "fits the target child audience perfectly".

== Track listing ==
Julie's Greenroom [Music From The Netflix Original Series]
No.	Title	Writer(s)	Performer(s)	Length
1.	"Mash-Up (Theme Song)"	Shaina Taub	Giullian Yao Gioiello	0:44
2.	"Anything Can Happen in the Theater"	Zina Goldrich, Marcy Heisler	Julie Andrews, G. Y. Gioiello	1:42
3.	"Hugo"	Eli Bolin, Joey Mazzarino	Ryan Shore	0:18
4.	"Shakespeare Shakes"	E. Bolin, J. Mazzarino	J. Barnhart, T. Bunch, F. Cordero, S. D'Abruzzo, D. Davies, G. Y. Gioiello, J. Tartaglia	1:04
5.	"Spike's Despair"	R. Shore	R. Shore	0:49
6.	"Let Your Voice Be Heard"	C. Jackson, J. Mazzarino	J. Barnhart, F. Cordero, S. D'Abruzzo, D. Davies, G. Y. Gioiello, J. Tartaglia	1:35
7.	"Cheering"	R. Shore	R. Shore	0:43
8.	"When You Act"	Wayne Kirkpatrick, Karey Kirkpatrick	J. Andrews, A. Baldwin	1:42
9.	"Fizz Breaks Joshua's Violin"	R. Shore	R. Shore	0:52
10.	"Julie & Gus"	R. Shore	R. Shore	0:32
11.	"Yes And"	Z. Goldrich, M. Heisler	J. Barnhart, F. Cordero, S. D'Abruzzo, D. Davies, G. Y. Gioiello, E. Kemper, J. Tartaglia	2:06
12.	"Circus Day: Clown Skills, Clown Lesson, Riley's Jester"	R. Shore	R. Shore	1:46
13.	"You Gotta Bring the Wow"	Mike Himelstein	J. Barnhart, T. Bunch, F. Cordero, S. D'Abruzzo, D. Davies, G. Y. Gioiello, J. Tartaglia	1:29
14.	"Sticky Handshake"	R. Shore	R. Shore	0:39
15.	"Juggling & Handstands"	R. Shore	R. Shore	0:25
16.	"Cirque Du Soleil"	Bill Sherman, J. Mazzarino	R. Shore	0:41
17.	"Snap It"	J. Mazzarino, B. Sherman	J. Barnhart, F. Cordero, S. D'Abruzzo, D. Davies, G. Y. Gioiello, J. Tartaglia	0:55
18.	"Runaway Cart"	R. Shore	R. Shore	0:33
19.	"Costume Workshop"	R. Shore	R. Shore	1:57
20.	"Someone Else's Shoes"	J. Mazzarino, B. Sherman	J. Barnhart, T. Burgess, F. Cordero, S. D'Abruzzo, D. Davies, G. Y. Gioiello, J. Tartaglia	1:04
21.	"A Scarftacular Day"	R. Shore	R. Shore	0:30
22.	"Wheelchair Steed"	R. Shore	R. Shore	0:52
23.	"Circle Up Greenies"	R. Shore	R. Shore	0:52
24.	"Take a Leap"	R. Shore	J. Andrews, J. Barnhart, F. Cordero, S. D'Abruzzo, D. Davies, D. H. Pierce, J. Tartaglia	1:47
25.	"Mash-Up (The Musical): Overture and Opening, The Arts and the Ogre, Your Horse Awaits, The Quest Begins, Princess Apple to the Rescue, Dance for Me, Come Home With Us, Finale and Bows"	Z. Goldrich, M. Heisler	R. Shore	6:27
26.	"Anything Can Happen in the Theater, Pt. 2"	Z. Goldrich, M. Heisler	J. Andrews, J. Barnhart, T. Bunch, Carol Burnett, F. Cordero, S. D'Abruzzo, D. Davies, G. Y. Gioiello, J. Tartaglia	1:51
27.	"Mash-Up (Reprise) [Finale]"	S. Taub	J. Tartaglia, J. Barnhart, F. Cordero, S. D'Abruzzo, D. Davies, T. Bunch	1:14

== Personnel ==
Credits adapted from the liner notes of Julie's Greenroom record and AllMusic.

- Directed by: Joey Mazzarino
- Produced by: Joey Mazzarino, Bill Sherman, Tom Keniston
- Executive Producers: Andy Yeatman, Dominque Bazay, Emma Walton Hamilton, Halle Stanford, Lisa Henson, Steve Sauer, Julie Andrews
- Creation by: Julie Andrews, Emma Walton Hamilton, Judy Rothman Rofé
- Music Composed by: Bill Sherman, Chris Jackson, Eli Bolin, Joey Mazzarino, Karey Kirkpatrick, Marcy Heisler, Mike Himelstein, Shaina Taub, Wayne Kirkpatrick, Zina Goldrich
- Music Arranged and Scored by: Ryan Shore
- Music Consultant: Larry Grossman
- Music Clearance: Ilyse Wolfe Tretter
- Music Editor: Anastassios "Tass" Filipos
- Soundtrack Producer: Cary E. Mansfield
- Mastering and Mixing: Chas Ferry, Daren Chadwick
- Post Producer: Cory McCrum
- Production Executive: Jessica Mansour
- Art Direction: Bill Pitzonka
- Primary Artists:
- Alec Baldwin, Carol Burnett, David Hyde Pierce, Dorien Davies, Ellie Kemper, Frankie Cordero, Giullian Yao Gioiello, Jennifer Barnhart, John Tartaglia, Julie Andrews, Stephanie D'Abruzzo, Tituss Burgess, Tyler Bunch
