= Julie Andrews Selects Her Favourite Disney Songs =

Compilation album by Julie Andrews
- Released: 10 May 2005
- Genre: Show tune, pop
- Label: Walt Disney

Julie Andrews chronology
The Princess Diaries 2: Royal Engagement (2004)	Julie Andrews Selects Her Favourite Disney Songs (2005)	At Her Very Best (2006)

Julie Andrews Selects Her Favourite Disney Songs is a compilation album released by Walt Disney Records on 10 May 2005 to commemorate the 50th anniversary of Disneyland. The album was released as part of the larger 50th Anniversary: A Musical History of Disneyland celebration. Featuring 15 tracks chosen by Andrews, the compilation spans multiple eras of Disney music, from early animated classics to the studio's late-20th-century Renaissance period. Some songs are tied directly to her Mary Poppins role, while others highlight the broader range of Disney's musical legacy.

Reception was generally favorable.

== Background and release ==
The album is part of a larger celebratory release titled 50th Anniversary: A Musical History of Disneyland. Julie Andrews, who famously portrayed Mary Poppins in the 1964 Disney film, was invited to curate a personal selection of her favorite Disney songs for this project.

The album contains 15 tracks that span various eras of Disney films, including early classics such as Snow White and the Seven Dwarfs, Cinderella, and Lady and the Tramp, as well as more modern entries from Disney's late '80s and early '90s Renaissance period, like The Lion King and Tarzan. Andrews performs or introduces several classic songs, including "Chim Chim Cher-ee", "Feed the Birds", both associated with her role as Mary Poppins. While some tracks are love songs like "Can You Feel the Love Tonight" or "You'll Be in My Heart" others are more playful or nostalgic in tone, such as "He's a Tramp" and "The Bare Necessities" the latter performed by Peggy Lee and Phil Harris.

The release was promoted as part of a broader set of musical tributes celebrating Disneyland's history. Alongside this compilation, Disney released a 6-CD box set, a 72-page collectible book titled The Sounds of Disneyland, and a limited-edition gold vinyl of Walt Disney Takes You to Disneyland, among other materials. The Julie Andrews album was available both individually and as part of this box set collection.

== Critical reception ==
Professional ratings
Review scores
Source	Rating
AllMusic	3.5/5 stars

Heather Phares from AllMusic described it as "a welcome sampling of beloved Disney characters and the singers who gave voices to them", noting the collection's diversity and highlighting Andrews' "charming" and "wistful" performances.

Erika Milvy of Parenting described the compilation as "one-stop shopping at its best". The New York Times noted that the album "hardly strays from the tasteful mainstream her reputation connotes", describing it as "so of another time (...) so polished and cinematic".

The album was also featured in lists and reviews on some journals, such as the Herald Sun, and Milwaukee Journal Sentinel.

== Track listing ==
Julie Andrews Selects Her Favourite Disney Songs
No.	Title	Writer(s)	Performer(s)	Length
1.	"Beauty and the Beast" (From Beauty and the Beast 1991 soundtrack)	Howard Ashman, Alan Menken	Angela Lansbury	2:46
2.	"Chim Chim Cher-ee" (From Mary Poppins 1964 soundtrack)	Richard M. Sherman, Robert B. Sherman	Julie Andrews, Karen Dotrice, Dick Van Dyke, Matthew Garber	2:48
3.	"Part of Your World" (From The Little Mermaid 1989 soundtrack)	Howard Ashman, Alan Menken	Jodi Benson	3:14
4.	"Some Day My Prince Will Come" (From Snow White and the Seven Dwarfs 1937 soundtrack)	Frank Churchill, Larry Morey	Adriana Caselotti	1:55
5.	"Can You Feel the Love Tonight" (From The Lion King 1994 soundtrack)	Elton John, Tim Rice	Sally Dworsky, Kristle Edwards, Nathan Lane, Ernie Sabella, Joseph Williams	3:00
6.	"The Bare Necessities" (From The Jungle Book 1967 soundtrack)	Terry Gilkyson	Phil Harris, Bruce Reitherman	4:51
7.	"He's a Tramp" (From Lady and the Tramp 1955 soundtrack)	Sonny Burke, Peggy Lee	Peggy Lee	2:02
8.	"A Whole New World" (From Aladdin 1992 soundtrack)	Alan Menken, Tim Rice	Brad Kane, Lea Salonga	2:41
9.	"A Dream Is a Wish Your Heart Makes" (From Cinderella 1950 soundtrack)	Mack David, Al Hoffman, Jerry Livingston	Mice Chorus, Ilene Woods	4:37
10.	"Bella Notte" (From Lady and the Tramp 1955 soundtrack)	Sonny Burke, Peggy Lee	Disney Studio Chorus, George Givot, Bill Thompson	2:41
11.	"Baby Mine" (From Dumbo 1941 soundtrack)	Frank Churchill, Ned Washington	Betty Noyes	2:08
12.	"You'll Be in My Heart" (From Tarzan 1999 soundtrack)	Phil Collins	Glenn Close, Phil Collins	1:38
13.	"The Second Star to the Right" (From Peter Pan 1953 soundtrack)	Sammy Cahn, Sammy Fain	The Jud Conlon Chorus	2:22
14.	"Feed the Birds" (From Mary Poppins 1964 soundtrack)	Richard M. Sherman, Robert B. Sherman	Julie Andrews, Disney Studio Chorus	3:50
15.	"When You Wish Upon a Star" (From Pinocchio 1940 soundtrack)	Leigh Harline, Ned Washington	Disney Studio Chorus, Cliff Edwards	3:16

== Personnel ==
Credits adapted from the liner notes of Julie Andrews Selects Her Favourite Disney Songs record.

- Compilation Producer: Jay Landers
- Executive Producer: Chris Montan
- Art Direction: Steve Gerdes
- Mastered by Stephen Marcussen
- Artist Coordination: Dani Markman
