= Thoroughly Modern Millie (soundtrack) =

Soundtrack album by Various artists
- Released: 1967
- Genre: Jazz
- Label: Decca

Julie Andrews chronology
The Sound of Music (1965)	Thoroughly Modern Millie (1967)	A Christmas Treasure (1967)

Singles from Thoroughly Modern Millie
- 1. "Thoroughly Modern Millie" Released: 1967

Thoroughly Modern Millie is the original soundtrack of the 1967 musical comedy film of the same name, directed by George Roy Hill and produced by Ross Hunter for Universal Pictures. The soundtrack, released by Decca Records in February 1967, blends 1920s jazz standards with new compositions to capture the spirit of the film's Roaring Twenties setting. Featuring Julie Andrews in her return to recording, alongside Carol Channing and Mary Tyler Moore, the album includes tracks like "Thoroughly Modern Millie", "Jimmy", and Channing's renditions of "Jazz Baby" and "Do It Again" .

Despite criticism for its short runtime and repeated medleys, the soundtrack was praised for its nostalgic energy, vibrant arrangements by André Previn, and contributions from Sammy Cahn and James Van Heusen.

Commercially, the album reached no. 16 on the Billboard 200, earning gold certification within a month, and achieving Top 10 in the UK.

== Background ==
The film Thoroughly Modern Millie set in the 1920s, stars Julie Andrews as the titular Millie Dillmount, alongside Carol Channing, Mary Tyler Moore, and James Fox. The soundtrack, released by Decca Records in February 1967 as the inaugural entry in their "1500 Deluxe Album Series", blends period jazz standards with original compositions, aiming to evoke the spirit of the Roaring Twenties.

The album marked Julie Andrews' return to recording after her performances in Mary Poppins (1964) and The Sound of Music (1965). Notably, Andrews had no exclusive recording contract at the time. The LP featured Carol Channing (fresh from her Broadway triumph in Hello, Dolly! ) singing two numbers, "Jazz Baby" and "Do It Again". The musical team included composer Elmer Bernstein (who won an Academy Award for his film score, though it was excluded from the album), arranger André Previn, and the songwriting duo Sammy Cahn and James Van Heusen, who contributed the title track and "The Tapioca".

== Promotion ==
Decca promoted the album aggressively, and packaged it with a deluxe color booklet containing behind-the-scenes photos and production notes.

=== Singles ===
The song "Thoroughly Modern Millie" was released as a single and reached number 3 on Billboard's Easy Listening (currently called Adult Contemporary) music chart, and number 5 at the Record World Top Non-Rock.

== Critical reception ==
Professional ratings
Review scores
Source	Rating
AllMusic	3.5/5 stars
NME	4/4 stars
Cast Album Reviews	1/5 stars

Cash Box described the album as "a potpourri of new songs and old favorites", praising its "bouncy, rollicking quality" and predicting it would be a commercial success. Variety focused on the performances of Julie Andrews and Carol Channing, calling the soundtrack "the best part of the production". Billboard emphasized the album's nostalgic appeal, calling it a return to the "wild, thrilling days of the 1920s". The review suggested that the high-energy performances would drive sales.

In a retrospective review, William Ruhlmann of AllMusic offered a more critical perspective. While praising Andrews' and Channing's performances, he noted that the album was "heavily padded" with repetitions and medleys. He also pointed out the absence of Elmer Bernstein's Academy Award-winning score.

Allen Evans of NME praised the album, calling it a strong follow-up to Andrews' previous hits like The Sound of Music and My Fair Lady. He highlighted the mix of nostalgic 1920s tunes ("Baby Face", "Poor Butterfly") and new songs ("Thoroughly Modern Millie", "Jimmy"), predicting they'd be popular. He also applauded Carol Channing's performances ("Jazz Baby", "Do It Again") and the orchestral arrangements by André Previn and Elmer Bernstein.

David Barbour of Cast Album Reviews dismissed the soundtrack as a "bizarre camp exercise" spoofing the 1920s with little coherence. He criticized its disjointed structure (more a "mishmash of old and new numbers" than a proper musical) and noted the album's padding with excessive instrumentals like the overture and exit music. While he admitted the title track was "catchy" and praised Jay Thompson's ballad "Jimmy", Barbour lambasted Carol Channing's over-the-top "Jazz Baby" ("studied by drag queens," he quipped) and Julie Andrews' inexplicable "Jewish Wedding Song" ("beyond description").

== Commercial performance ==
The Thoroughly Modern Millie soundtrack debuted at No. 155 on the Billboard 200 (April 15) before climbing to No. 16 (3 June) and staying on the chart for 48 weeks. Its strong sales earned it a gold certification in under a month, for more than a million dollars in sales.

In the UK, the album entered at No. 31 (October 28), peaked at No. 9 (November 18), and remained on the chart for 16 weeks.

== Track listing ==
No.	Title	Writer(s)	Performer(s)	Length
1.	"Prelude / Thoroughly Modern Millie"	Jimmy Van Heusen, Sammy Cahn	Julie Andrews	2:42
2.	"Overture: Baby Face / Do It Again / Poor Butterfly / Stumbling / Japanese Sandman"	Benny Davis, Buddy DeSylva, George Gershwin, Harry Akst, John Golden, Raymond Egan, Raymond Hubbell, Richard A. Whiting, Zez Confrey	Orchestra	3:34
3.	"Jimmy"	Jay Thompson	Julie Andrews	3:05
4.	"The Tapioca"	Jimmy Van Heusen, Sammy Cahn	Orchestra, Julie Andrews & James Fox	2:57
5.	"Jazz Baby"	Bianche Merrill, M. K. Jerome	Carol Channing	2:41
6.	"Jewish Wedding Song "Trinkt Le Chaim""	Julie Andrews	Julie Andrews	3:43
7.	"Intermission Medley: Thoroughly Modern Millie / Jimmy / Jewish Wedding Song (Trinkt Le Chaim) / Baby Face"	Benny Davis, Harry Akst, Jay Thompson, Jimmy Van Heusen, Julie Andrews Sammy Cahn	Orchestra	3:40
8.	"Poor Butterfly"	John Golden	Julie Andrews	3:32
9.	"Rose Of Washington Square - Ann Dee"	James F. Hanley	Elmer Bernstein	1:15
10.	"Baby Face"	Benny Davis, Harry Akst	Julie Andrews	2:43
11.	"Do It Again!"	Buddy DeSylva, George Gershwin	Carol Channing	2:01
12.	"Reprise: Thoroughly Modern Millie"	Jimmy Van Heusen, Sammy Cahn	Julie Andrews	0:58
13.	"Exit Music: Jazz Baby / Jimmy / Thoroughly Modern Millie"	E. Y. "Yip" Harburg, Blanche Merrill, Jay Thompson, Jimmy Van Heusen, M. K. Jerome, Sammy Cahn	Orchestra	2:36

== Personnel ==
Credits adapted from the liner notes of Thoroughly Modern Millie record.

- Conduction & Musical Arrangements by Andre Previn
- Produced by Charles "Bud" Dant
- Score Produced by Elmer Bernstein

== Charts ==
Weekly chart performance for Thoroughly Modern Millie
Chart (1967)	Peak position
Canada Top Albums/CDs (RPM)	17
UK Albums (Official Charts)	9
US (Billboard Top LP's)	16
US (Cash Box Top 100 Albums)	14
US (Record World Top 100 LP's)	5

== Certifications ==
Region	Certification	Certified units/sales
United States (RIAA)	Gold	500,000^{^}
^{^} Shipments figures based on certification alone.
