= Victor/Victoria (cast recording) =

Cast recording by Julie Andrews
- Released: 1995
- Genre: Show tune
- Label: Philips

Julie Andrews chronology
The Music of Richard Rodgers (1994)	Victor/Victoria (1995)	Here I'll Stay (1996)

Singles from Victor/Victoria
- 1. "Living in the Shadows" Released: 1996

Victor/Victoria is the original Broadway cast recording of the 1995 musical, starring Julie Andrews and released by Philips Records. The album captures Julie Andrews' performance in the Broadway musical adaptation of Blake Edwards' 1982 film. With music by Henry Mancini (completed by Frank Wildhorn after Mancini's death) and lyrics by Leslie Bricusse, the album blends songs from the film with new material, including Wildhorn's "Living in the Shadows", released as a charity single. The 27-track recording incorporates dialogue to clarify the story, following a struggling singer who poses as a male female impersonator in Paris.

Nominated for a 1997 Grammy (Best Musical Show Album), the release received mixed reviews, while some praised Andrews' vocal warmth and numbers like "Le Jazz Hot!", others found the score uneven.

== Background and release ==
The musical features a book by Blake Edwards (who also directed), music by Henry Mancini, lyrics by Leslie Bricusse, and additional music and lyrics by Frank Wildhorn. It is based on Edwards' 1982 film of the same name, which itself was a remake of the 1933 German comedy Viktor und Viktoria by Reinhold Schünzel. Henry Mancini passed away before completing the score, and Wildhorn was brought in to finish the music.

At the heart of the plot is a penniless songstress who reinvents herself under the guidance of a shrewd showman, pretending to be a man performing as a woman. The deception leads to stardom in the Parisian entertainment scene, until a smitten but dangerous crime lord complicates everything.

The album featured 27 tracks, with a notable inclusion of dialogue (12 cuts contained speeches to help listeners fully understand the story and how the songs functioned in the stage adaptation). The album showcased music from both the 1982 film and the stage version, with rearrangements of Mancini's original melodies, alongside new material, including three songs by Wildhorn.

== Single ==
The song "Living in the Shadows" was released as a Special Limited Edition single (Philips – SACD 1199) for Broadway Cares/Equity Fights AIDS. The song is one of three new tracks not included on the Victor/Victoria (1982) soundtrack or in the movie, and was composed by Wildhorn in collaboration with Bricusse after Mancini's death. It appears in the musical beginning with a very long piano solo, where Andrews' character just stood onstage and ruminated while the piano accompanied her musing. The song became the stage production's signature tune.

== Critical reception ==
Professional ratings
Review scores
Source	Rating
AllMusic	4.5/5 stars

Sara Sytsma from AllMusic rated it four and a half out of five stars, while the Tulsa World review celebrated Andrews' commanding presence, particularly in numbers like "Le Jazz Hot" and "Living in the Shadows", also praising Rachel York's comedic standout "Paris Makes Me Horny".

Jack Zink of the Sun Sentinel praised the cast album for its "interesting and valuable addition" of dialogue. He highlighted Andrews' voice for bringing "warmth and suppleness" to the music, elevating tracks like "Trust Me", "Le Jazz Hot", and Tony Roberts' "Paris by Night". He also contrasted the album's "crystal clear" sound favorably against the "muddy, slurry" mixes of modern rock-pop operas like Evita and Rent, calling Victor/Victoria "bright, intelligible, and splendidly listenable".

Everett Evans from Houston Chronicle called the album a highlight of Broadway's "season of the diva", praising Julie Andrews' triumphant return despite her slightly lowered top notes. While deeming the Bricusse/Mancini score "merely middling", he applauded "Le Jazz Hot" and "Louis Says" as spirited numbers, and highlighted "Almost a Love Song" and "Living in the Shadows" for finally letting Andrews showcase emotional depth. The album, he noted, remains essential for fans.

The Orange County Register's Clifford A. Ridley acknowledged Victor/Victoria as Broadway's newest hit but found the show problematic, questioning Julie Andrews' ability to convincingly portray a man or a tuxedo-clad femme fatale. He pointed out the same issue carried over to the album, with Andrews' "aristocratic diction" overshadowing her character. However, if listeners overlooked the plot and Bricusse's "puerile lyrics", Ridley argued they'd discover Henry Mancini's "surprisingly good" music—brassy, upbeat, and nostalgically reminiscent of classic Broadway sophistication.

== Accolades ==
In 1997, the cast album earned a nomination for the 39th Annual Grammy Awards in the Best Musical Show Album category. The other nominees were Riverdance: Music from the Show by Bill Whelan (who served as both composer/lyricist and producer); Bring in 'da Noise, Bring in 'da Funk with music by Ann Duquesnay, Zane Mark and Daryl Waters, lyrics by Duquesnay, Reg E. Gaines and George C. Wolfe, produced by James P. Nichols and performed by the Original Broadway Cast with Savion Glover; the 1996 Broadway revival of A Funny Thing Happened on the Way to the Forum produced by Phil Ramone with music and lyrics by Stephen Sondheim; and Rent with music and lyrics by Jonathan Larson, produced by Arif Mardin and Steve Skinner. The award ultimately went to Bill Whelan for Riverdance.

Awards and nominations for Victor/Victoria
Year	Award	Category	Result	Ref.
1997	39th Grammy Awards	Best Musical Show Album	Nominated	

== Track listing ==
No.	Title	Writer(s)	Performer(s)	Length
1.	"Overture"	Leslie Bricusse / Henry Mancini		3:13
2.	"Paris by Night"	Leslie Bricusse / Henry Mancini	Carole Todd	5:01
3.	"Scene: Chez Lui"	Leslie Bricusse / Henry Mancini	Julie Andrews / Adam Heller / Carole Todd	2:46
4.	"Scene: Small Square"	Leslie Bricusse / Henry Mancini	Julie Andrews / Carole Todd	2:15
5.	"If I Were a Man"	Leslie Bricusse / Henry Mancini	Julie Andrews	2:46
6.	"Scene: Toddy's Flat"	Leslie Bricusse / Henry Mancini	Julie Andrews / Michael Cripe / Carole Todd	0:46
7.	"Trust Me"	Frank Wildhorn	Julie Andrews / Carole Todd	4:17
8.	"Scene: Cassell's Nightclub: Le Jazz Hot!"	Leslie Bricusse / Henry Mancini	Julie Andrews / Richard B. Shull	7:47
9.	"Scene: Backstage at Cassell's"	Leslie Bricusse / Henry Mancini	Julie Andrews / Gregory Jbara / Michael Nouri / Carole Todd / Rachel York	0:15
10.	"Scene: Left Bank Cafe"	Leslie Bricusse / Henry Mancini	Julie Andrews / Michael Nouri / Carole Todd / Rachel York	0:24
11.	"Tango-Paris by Night"	Leslie Bricusse / Henry Mancini	Julie Andrews / Rachel York	2:21
12.	"Scene: Paris Hotel Suites: Paris Makes Me Horny"	Leslie Bricusse / Henry Mancini	Michael Nouri / Rachel York	3:42
13.	"Scene: Paris Hotel Suites"	Leslie Bricusse / Henry Mancini	Julie Andrews / Carole Todd	2:23
14.	"Crazy World"	Leslie Bricusse / Henry Mancini	Julie Andrews	3:19
15.	"Louis Says"	Frank Wildhorn	Julie Andrews	4:00
16.	"King's Dilemma"	Leslie Bricusse / Henry Mancini	Julie Andrews	4:38
17.	"Cat and Mouse"	Leslie Bricusse / Henry Mancini		2:25
18.	"Apache"	Leslie Bricusse / Henry Mancini		0:37
19.	"You and Me"	Leslie Bricusse / Henry Mancini	Julie Andrews / Carole Todd	2:50
20.	"Scene: Small Square: Paris by Night (Reprise)"	Leslie Bricusse / Henry Mancini	Tara O'Brien	3:09
21.	"Scene: Paris Hotel Suites: Almost a Love Song"	Leslie Bricusse / Henry Mancini	Julie Andrews / Michael Nouri	4:42
22.	"Chicago, Illinois"	Leslie Bricusse / Henry Mancini	Rachel York	4:37
23.	"Scene: Chicago Speakeasy"	Leslie Bricusse / Henry Mancini	Ken Land / Rachel York	0:49
24.	"Living in the Shadows"	Frank Wildhorn	Julie Andrews	3:29
25.	"Scene: Paris Hotel Suites"	Leslie Bricusse / Henry Mancini	Julie Andrews / Ken Land / Michael Nouri / Carole Todd / Rachel York	1:01
26.	"Living in the Shadows (Reprise)"	Frank Wildhorn	Julie Andrews	1:23
27.	"Victor/Victoria"	Leslie Bricusse / Henry Mancini	Julie Andrews / Carole Todd	5:27

== Personnel ==
Adapted from the album's liner notes.

Production

- Lyrics by Leslie Bricusse
- Music by Henry Mancini
- Additional Musical Material by Frank Wildhorn
- Music Direction and Vocals Arrangement by Ian Fraser
- Orchestrated by Billy Byers
- Produced by Thomas Z. Shepard
- Written (book) by Blake Edwards

Musicians

- Vocals [André Cassell] – Richard B. Shull
- Vocals [Carroll Todd] – Tony Roberts
- Vocals [Henri Labisse] – Adam Heller
- Vocals [Jazz Singer] – Devin Richards
- Vocals [King Marchan] – Michael Nouri
- Vocals [Norma Cassidy] – Rachel York
- Vocals [Richard Di Nardo] – Michael Cripe
- Vocals [Sal Andretti] – Ken Land
- Vocals [Squash Bernstein] – Gregory Jbara
- Vocals [Street Singer] – Tara O'Brien
- Vocals [Victoria Grant] – Julie Andrews
- Accordion – Charlie Giordano
- Bass – Richard Sarpola
- Cello – Diane Barere, Jeanne Le Blanc*, Jesse Levy
- Concertmaster – Dale Stuckenbruck
- Conductor – Ian Fraser
- Conductor [Associate] – Joseph Thalken
- Coordinator [Music] – John Miller
- Drums – Perry Cavari
- Guitar – Bob Rose
- Keyboards – Joseph Thalken
- Percussion – Benjamin Herman
- Trombone – George Flynn, Jim Pugh
- Trumpet – Danny Cahn, Hollis Burridge, John Frosk
- Viola – Alfred Brown, Anne-Marie Bedney, Jean Dane*, Jessy Levine, Olivia Koppell, Richard Spencer
- Violin – Barry Finclair, Belinda Whitney-Barratt, Charles Libov*, David Nadien, Gerald Tarack, Karen Karlsrud, Karl Kawahara, Laura Seaton, Martin Agee, *Rebekah Johnson, Sanford Allen
- Woodwind – Albert Regni, Dan Wieloszynski, Edward Joffe*, John Campo, Kenneth Dybisz*

Design

- Photography by Francesco Scavullo
- Liner Notes by André Previn
