= The Sound of Music (song) =

Song from the musical by Rodgers and Hammerstein

Song
- Published: 1959
- Composer: Richard Rodgers
- Lyricist: Oscar Hammerstein II

"The Sound of Music" is the title song from the musical of the same name that premiered in 1959. It was composed by Richard Rodgers with lyrics written by Oscar Hammerstein II. The song introduces the character of Maria, a young novice in an Austrian abbey.

== Performances ==
In 1959, Rodgers and Hammerstein asked singer Patti Page to record the title song of their forthcoming musical, The Sound of Music, hoping for some national attention. A week before the opening of the Broadway production, she recorded the song for Mercury Records. The disc debuted at No. 99 on the Billboard Hot 100 on the day that the musical opened on Broadway. She featured the song on her national TV variety show sponsored by Oldsmobile, The Patti Page Olds Show.

The song was sung by Mary Martin in the 1959 original Broadway production and by Julie Andrews in the 1965 film version, with a reprise by the Von Trapp family later in the film. The song was ranked tenth in the American Film Institute's list of the 100 Greatest Songs in Movie History.

=== Cues ===
The stage version of the song has a four-line verse ("My day in the hills has come to an end I know...") followed by the familiar chorus "The hills are alive with the sound of music...". The film soundtrack and the soundtrack album have two different instrumental preludes to "The hills are alive..." both of which contain portions of the music of the original verse. The cast album to the 1998 Broadway revival contains the four-line verse as well as the instrumental prelude present in the film version. This version is in the same key as the film version.

== In popular culture ==
The opening line, "the hills are alive with the sound of music" appears in the 1968 Beatles movie Yellow Submarine and the TV show Friends in Season 1 Episode 22 (1995). The song is referenced many times in the film Moulin Rouge! (2001). The Julie Andrews recording from the film features in the 1993 film Addams Family Values. Renée Zellweger performs the song in the 2004 film Bridget Jones: The Edge of Reason.

A Simpsons comic book has a section in which Sideshow Bob and his brother Cecil sing parodies of musicals. Some of the songs are based on The Sound of Music, with the original lyrics replaced by ones about killing Bart Simpson. One example: "The hills are alive and they ate Bart Simpson."

In 2013, Carrie Underwood performed this song while portraying Maria in the television broadcast The Sound of Music Live!, which was seen live by more than 18 million viewers. JLS sampled the song on their 2010 single "The Club Is Alive". The single debuted on the UK Singles Chart at number one.
