= Victor/Victoria (soundtrack) =

Soundtrack album by Henry Mancini, Julie Andrews, and various artists
- Released: 1982
- Genre: Jazz, Show tune
- Label: MGM Records

Julie Andrews chronology
10 (1979)	Victor/Victoria (1982)	Love Me Tender (1982)

Singles from Victor/Victoria
- 1. "Le Jazz Hot!" Released: 1982

Victor/Victoria is the soundtrack album of the film of the same name released in 1982 by MGM Records. The score was composed by Henry Mancini, with lyrics by Leslie Bricusse, and performed by Henry Mancini & His Orchestra, featuring vocals by Julie Andrews. The album accompanies the film directed by Blake Edwards, a musical comedy set in 1930s Paris.

The original release was a deluxe gatefold album with 12 tracks. In 1994, a Compact disc (CD) edition was released, expanding the selection to 16 tracks by adding instrumental pieces and Robert Preston's performance of "Shady Dame from Seville" in drag. In 2002, the album was remastered and expanded edition with 31 tracks in total, featuring 13 previously unreleased tracks. The liner notes provided insights into the production process.

Regarding the music critics, Richie Unterberger from AllMusic rated the album three and a half out of five stars and described Henry Mancini and Leslie Bricusse's compositions as a stylistic throwback to the stage and screen sound of the 1930s and 1940s, albeit with better fidelity than contemporary recordings from that era. He considered that the film's slightly more risqué plotline set it apart from traditional musicals of its kind. He also said that the extensive instrumental interludes in the 2002 edition might disrupt the flow of Preston and Andrews' performances. The critic and author John Kenrick praised the 2002 remastered edition in his review for the expanded material and superior sound quality. He lauded Julie Andrews, Robert Preston, and Leslie Ann Warren's performances, considering the film Hollywood's last great live-action musical. According to the author the morable moments included the full "Cherry Ripe" aria and Preston's playful "Shady Dame" reprise.

At the 25th Annual Grammy Awards, the album was nominated for Best Album of Original Score Written for a Motion Picture or a Television Special but lost to E.T. the Extra-Terrestrial by John Williams.

Commercially, the album managed to chart on the Billboard 200 in 1982. It debuted on June 5, at No. 183 and peaked at No. 174 on June 12, the following week. In total, it remained on the chart for four weeks.

== Track listing ==
No.	Title	Writer(s)	Performer(s)	Length
1.	"Main Title "Crazy World""	L. Bricusse, H. Mancini	Orchestra	2:07
2.	"You and Me"	L. Bricusse, H. Mancini	Julie Andrews, Robert Preston	2:52
3.	"The Shady Dame from Seville"	L. Bricusse, H. Mancini	Julie Andrews	4:29
4.	"Alone in Paris"	L. Bricusse, H. Mancini	Orchestra	2:52
5.	"King's Can-Can"	L. Bricusse, H. Mancini	Orchestra	1:57
6.	"Le Jazz Hot!"	L. Bricusse, H. Mancini	Julie Andrews	4:22
7.	"Crazy World"	L. Bricusse, H. Mancini	Julie Andrews	2:30
8.	"Chicago, Illinois"	L. Bricusse, H. Mancini	Lesley Ann Warren	2:46
9.	"Cat and Mouse"	L. Bricusse, H. Mancini	Orchestra	3:13
10.	"You and Me"	L. Bricusse, H. Mancini	Orchestra	2:42
11.	"Gay Paree"	L. Bricusse, H. Mancini	Robert Preston
12.	"Finale"	L. Bricusse, H. Mancini	Orchestra	4:50

== Personnel ==
Credits adapted from the liner notes of Victor/Victoria record.

- Lyrics by Leslie Bricusse
- Music by Henry Mancini
- Produced by Joe Reisman
- Engineered by Dick Bogert, John Richards, Richard Simpson
- Recorded at The Music Centre, Wembley, England
- Remixed at A&M Studios, Hollywood, California.
- Mastered at the Reference Point, Burbank, California
- Pressed by PRC Recording Company, Richmond, IN

== Charts ==
Weekly chart performance for Victor/Victoria
Chart (1982)	Peak position
U.S. Billboard Top LPs & Tape	174
