= I've Grown Accustomed to Her Face =

Song composed by Frederick Loewe with lyrics by Alan Jay Lerner

Song
- Published: 1956 by Chappell & Co.
- Genre: Show tune
- Composer: Frederick Loewe
- Lyricist: Alan Jay Lerner

"I've Grown Accustomed to Her Face" is a song from the 1956 musical My Fair Lady, with music by Frederick Loewe and lyrics by Alan Jay Lerner. It was originally performed by Rex Harrison as Professor Henry Higgins who also performed it in the 1964 film version.

== Background ==
The song expresses Professor Henry Higgins's sentimental and wistful sadness for his pupil Eliza Doolittle who has chosen to walk out of his life, a sudden realization of how much he will miss her, and, in passing, his sadness for her life in a chosen marriage.

== Rosemary Clooney cover ==
Singer Rosemary Clooney released a version titled "I've Grown Accustomed to Your Face" as the B-side to her single "I Could Have Danced All Night". "I've Grown Accustomed to Your Face" managed to reach No. 70 on the Billboard Top 100 that year, while the A-side climbed to No. 49.
