= Wouldn't It Be Loverly =

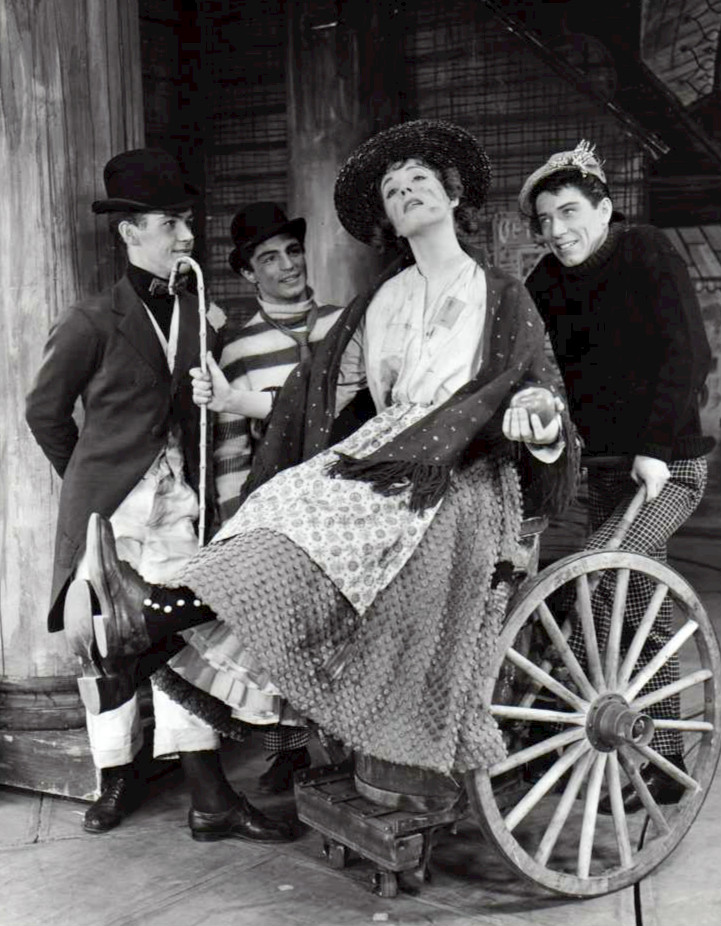
- Julie Andrews as Eliza in "Wouldn't It Be Loverly" segment, 1957

Song
- Written: 1956
- Published: 1956
- Genre: Showtune
- Composer(s): Frederick Loewe
- Lyricist(s): Alan Jay Lerner

"Wouldn't It Be Loverly" is a popular song by Alan Jay Lerner and Frederick Loewe, written for the 1956 Broadway play My Fair Lady.

The song is sung by Cockney flower girl Eliza Doolittle and her street friends. It expresses Eliza's wish for a better life. In addition to pronouncing "lovely" as "loverly", the song lyrics highlight other facets of the Cockney accent that Professor Henry Higgins wants to refine away as part of his social experiment.

In the stage version it was sung by Julie Andrews. In the 1964 film version, Marni Nixon dubbed the song for Audrey Hepburn. Both Andrews' and Nixon's versions are available on the original cast and soundtrack albums, respectively, and Hepburn's original version is available in the specials for the DVD of the film.

Andy Williams released a version of the song on his 1964 album, The Great Songs from "My Fair Lady" and Other Broadway Hits.

In the late 1980s and early 1990s the song was used in television advertisements for Commonwealth Bank of Australia home mortgages.
