= The Rain in Spain =

Song from the musical My Fair Lady

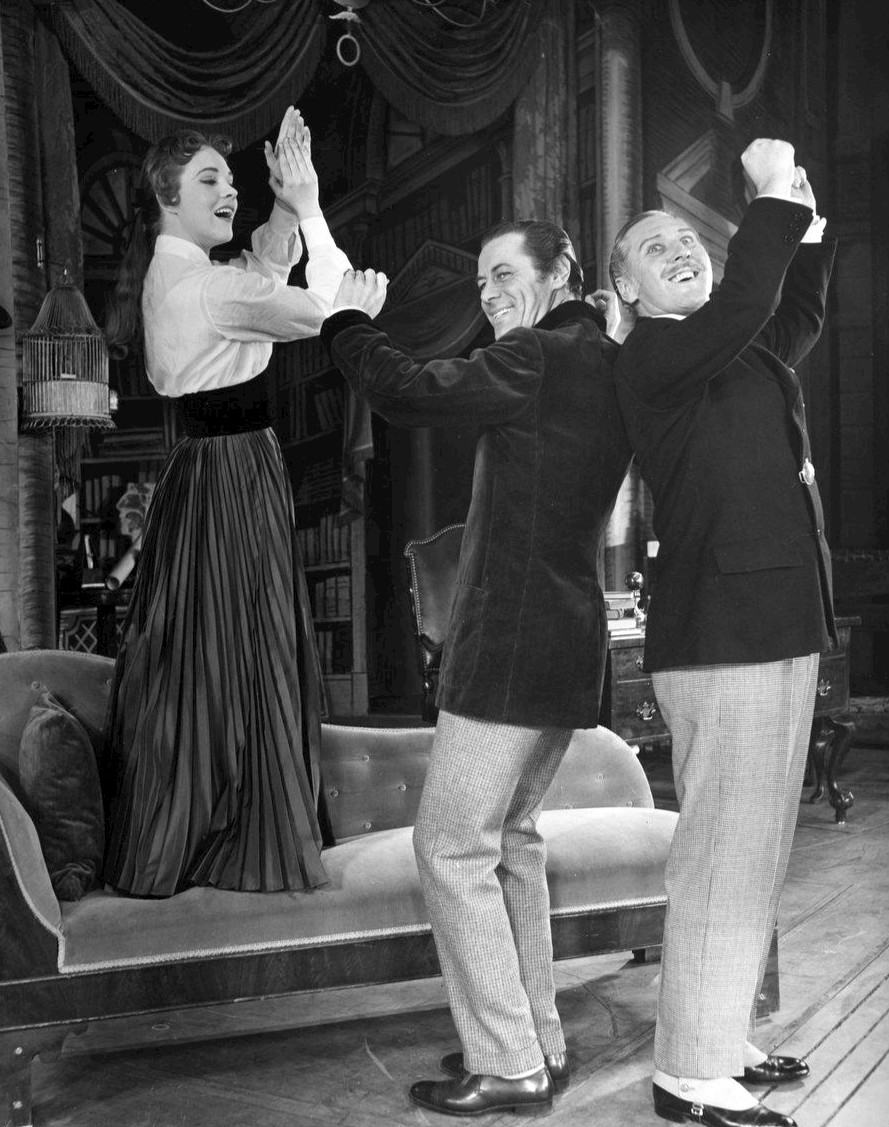
- Julie Andrews as Eliza, Rex Harrison as Higgins, Robert Coote as Pickering in "The Rain in Spain" segment, 1957

Song
- Published: 1956
- Genre: Musical theatre
- Composer: Frederick Loewe
- Lyricist: Alan Jay Lerner

"The Rain in Spain" is a song from the musical My Fair Lady, with music by Frederick Loewe and lyrics by Alan Jay Lerner, published in 1956.

The song is a turning point in the plotline of the musical. Professor Higgins and Colonel Pickering have been drilling Eliza Doolittle incessantly with speech exercises, trying to break her Cockney accent speech pattern. The key lyric in the song is "the rain in Spain stays mainly in the plain", which contains five words that a Cockney would pronounce with [æɪ] or [aɪ] – more like "eye" [aɪ] than the Received Pronunciation diphthong [eɪ].

With the three of them nearly exhausted, Eliza finally "gets it", and recites the sentence with all "proper" long-As. The trio breaks into song, repeating this key phrase as well as singing other exercises correctly, such as "In Hertford, Hereford, and Hampshire, hurricanes hardly ever happen", which Eliza had failed before by H-dropping.

== Origin ==
The phrase does not appear in Shaw's original play Pygmalion, on which My Fair Lady is based, but it is used in the 1938 film of the play. According to The Disciple and His Devil, the biography of Gabriel Pascal by his wife Valerie, it was he who introduced the famous phonetic exercises "The rain in Spain stays mainly in the plain" and "In Hertford, Hereford, and Hampshire, hurricanes hardly ever happen" into the script of the film, both of which were later used in the song in My Fair Lady.

== In other languages ==
Versions of "The rain in Spain stays mainly in the plain" in various languages include:

- Danish: "En snegl på vejen er tegn på regn i Spanien" ("A snail on the road is a sign of rain in Spain")
- Dutch: "Het Spaanse graan heeft de orkaan doorstaan" ("The Spanish wheat has survived the hurricane")
- Finnish: "Käy fiestaan hienon miekkamiehen tie" ("The road of the fine swordsman goes to a fiesta"). Also: "En säiden tähden lähde fandangoon" ("Because of the weather, I won't do the fandango").
- French: "Le ciel serein d'Espagne est sans embruns ("The clear Spanish sky is free of sea spray")
- German: "Es grünt so grün, wenn Spaniens Blüten blüh'n" ("it turns green so green when Spain's blossoms bloom")
- Hebrew: "ברד ירד בדרום ספרד" ("Barad yarad bidrom sfarad haerev": Hail fell in southern Spain this evening.)
- Hungarian: "Lenn délen édes éjen édent remélsz" ("On a sweet night in the south, you hope for Eden".)
- Italian: "La rana in Spagna gracida in campagna" ("The frog in Spain croaks in the country side") and "Nei Pirenei c'è aria di nevai" ("In the Pyrenees there are blizzards brewing")
- Polish: "W Hiszpanii mży, gdy dżdżyste przyjdą dni" ("It drizzles in Spain when come the rainy days")
- Portuguese: "O rei de Roma ruma a Madrid" ("The king of Rome heads to Madrid") emphasizing the correct pronunciation of the voiced alveolar trill
- Russian: "Карл у Клары украл кораллы" ("Karl u Klary ukral korally" - "Carl has stolen corals from Clara")
- Spanish: "La lluvia en Sevilla es una pura maravilla" ("The rain in Seville is truly a marvel", playing with the sound of the "ll").
- Swedish: "Den spanska räven rev en annan räv" ("The Spanish fox tore another fox")

== Glee cover ==
In 2012, a punk rock version of "The Rain in Spain" was performed in the comedy-musical TV series Glee, episode "Choke", by Mark Salling (as his character Puck) with his fictional glee club, New Directions.
