= I Could Have Danced All Night =

1956 song from My Fair Lady

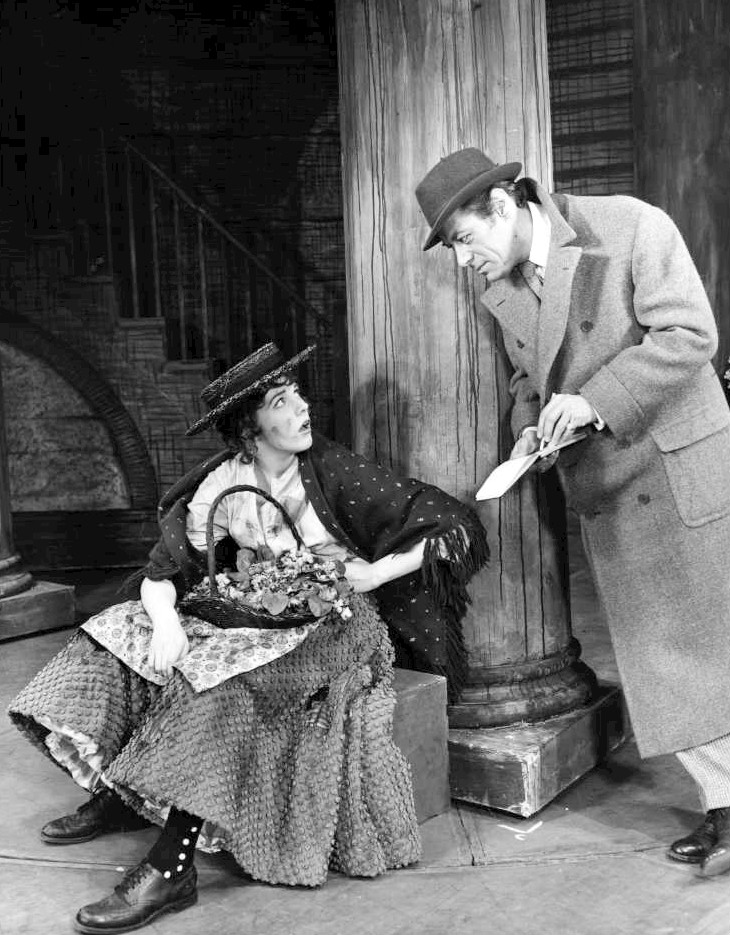
- Julie Andrews (Eliza), Rex Harrison (Higgins) in My Fair Lady

Song by Julie Andrews (Broadway) Audrey Hepburn (film- dubbed by:) Marni Nixon
- Published: 1956
- Genre: Musical theatre
- Songwriter(s): Composer: Frederick Loewe; Lyricist: Alan Jay Lerner

"I Could Have Danced All Night" is a song from the musical My Fair Lady, with music written by Frederick Loewe and lyrics by Alan Jay Lerner, published in 1956. The song is sung by the musical's heroine, Eliza Doolittle, expressing her exhilaration and excitement after an impromptu dance with her tutor, Henry Higgins, in the small hours of the morning. In a counterpoint during the second of 3 rounds, two maids and the housekeeper, Mrs. Pearce, urge Eliza to go to bed, but she ignores them.

It was first performed by Julie Andrews in the original Broadway production of My Fair Lady. In the 1964 film adaptation of the musical, the song was sung by Marni Nixon, dubbing the singing voice of Audrey Hepburn, who played Eliza Doolittle. In 2004, Nixon's version finished at #17 on AFI's 100 Years...100 Songs survey of top tunes in American cinema.

== Notable recordings ==
Hit versions of the song were recorded by Sylvia Syms, Dinah Shore, Angélica María, Ben E. King as an ATCO single, Frank Sinatra, Rosemary Clooney, and Jamie Cullum. It was featured in The Birdcage sung by Nathan Lane, Hank Azaria, Gene Hackman, Robin Williams and Dianne Wiest. Many actresses have also sung the song in the stage version of the musical including Martine McCutcheon, Laura Michelle Kelly, Amy Nuttall, Lisa O'Hare, and Lauren Ambrose.

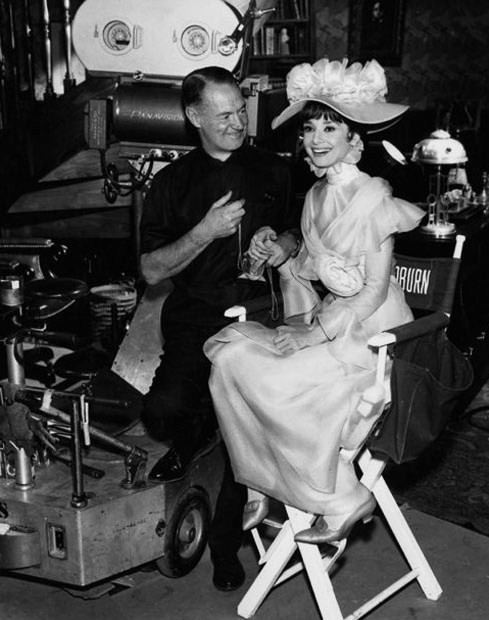
Audrey Hepburn in My Fair Lady

Peggy Lee recorded a Cha-cha-cha version on her 1960 album Latin ala Lee!.

Andy Williams covered the song on his 1964 album The Great Songs from My Fair Lady and Other Broadway Hits. Shirley Bassey recorded and released this song on two 1965 albums, including "Shirley Stops The Shows" released in the UK, and 'Shirley Bassey Belts The Best' released in the USA. Petula Clark recorded a version for her 1968 album The Other Man's Grass Is Always Greener.

The song was performed by Jane Powell in the 1959 NBC television special Sunday Showcase "Give My Regards to Broadway", for which a kinescope recording still exists.

In 1976, Florence Henderson performed the song on The Brady Bunch Variety Hour.

The song was performed by Jayma Mays as her character Emma Pillsbury on the FOX television show Glee in the episode "Mash-Up".

I Could Have Danced All Night was performed by young British soprano Hollie Steel during her audition on Britain's Got Talent. She later recorded the song on her debut album.

Noted Wagnerian soprano Birgit Nilsson recorded the song for the 1960 gala performance recording of Johann Strauss's operetta Die Fledermaus on the Decca/London label. Herbert von Karajan conducted the recording of the operetta, but the conductor of this excerpt, as well as that of most of the other gala excerpts included, is not identified.

Jane Ira Bloom included the song in her 2011 album Wingwalker.

== Covers and parodies ==
- On the children's show Sesame Street, Count von Count, his wife the Countess, and her mother Mama Countess sing a song called "I Could Have Counted All Night", which spoofs "I Could Have Danced All Night".
- On the 2006 Doctor Who episode "The Girl in the Fireplace", the Tenth Doctor (played by David Tennant) drunkenly sings a few lines from the chorus.
