= The Best of Julie Andrews =

Compilation album by Julie Andrews
- Released: 1972
- Genres: Show tune, pop
- Label: Columbia/CBS

Julie Andrews chronology
Julie and Carol at Lincoln Center (1971)	The Best of Julie Andrews (1972)	The Secret of Christmas (1975)

The Best of Julie Andrews (released in the US as The World of Julie Andrews) is a compilation album released in 1972 (1973 in US) by English actress and singer Julie Andrews, on CBS label. The album brings together recordings made by Andrews for Columbia Records during the late 1950s and early 1960s. It includes a selection of songs drawn from both her theatrical performances and her studio albums.

The album release coincided with a period of renewed public attention in the United States, prompted by The Julie Andrews Show broadcast on ABC. The record label strategically utilized this moment of heightened visibility to enhance commercial interest in her earlier works.

== Recording history ==
The collection features four tracks from the 1956 original London cast recording of My Fair Lady: "I Could Have Danced All Night", "Just You Wait", "Without You", and "Wouldn't It Be Loverly?". These recordings originate from Andrews' role as Eliza Doolittle and represent her early work on the theatrical stage. Other tracks are drawn from two studio albums released by Andrews in 1962: Broadway's Fair Julie and Don't Go in the Lion's Cage Tonight and Other Heartrending Ballads and Raucous Ditties. The first includes songs by composers such as Irving Berlin, George and Ira Gershwin, and Rodgers and Hart. The second features English music hall material, including titles like "The Honeysuckle and the Bee", "Burlington Bertie from Bow", "Don't Go in the Lion's Cage Tonight" and "Who Threw the Overalls in Mrs. Murphy's Chowder".

== Releases ==
The album was originally released under different titles and configurations. The U.S. edition is part of a series of double albums titled "The World of..." featuring CBS label artists such as Dolly Parton, Johnny Cash and Lynn Anderson. In 1980, it was re-released by Harmony Records under the title Souvenir Album (#CSP 125) with new cover art. The CD version of this edition (#471122 2) excluded six songs: "If Love Were All", "I Don't Care", "Oh Dear What Can The Matter Be", "She Is More To Be Pitied Than Censured", "Wouldn't It Be Loverly" and "Burlington Bertie From Bow". In 1994, The Best of Julie Andrews was released in CD by Columbia (#983403 2) with the original 20 tracks included.

== Critical reception ==
Professional ratings
Review scores
Source	Rating
AllMusic	3.5/5 stars
Hi-Fi News & Record Review	A:2
Stereo Review	Performance: Distant; Record: Variable

Billboard praised the album as "a good selection", while Gramophone contrasted Andrews' "clinically formal to the point of primness" soprano with the "extrovert vitality" of Liza Minnelli, noting that the material did not always suit her style, although there was "adequate redemption" in some performances.

Arthur Jackson of Hi-Fi News & Record Review wrote: "I know there are many worse things in the world of music, but Julie's eternal prissy soubrette approach does get me down a bit". He admitted this view might not be widely shared and noted that her recent TV series could help the album gain more attention. Peter Reilly of Stereo Review wrote that Julie Andrews' album felt like a cash-in on her TV show and lacked emotional connection. He observed that while she was a "relentless performer", she had limited "feel for the microphone or its possibilities".

Reviewing the Souvenir Album edition William Ruhlmann of AllMusic wrote that "Andrews' versatility is demonstrated abundantly, but the album veers from one style to another", pointing out a lack of cohesive flow between the Broadway and novelty selections.

== Track listing ==
No.	Title	Writer(s)	Original Album	Length
1.	"I Could Have Danced All Night"	Alan Jay Lerner, Frederick Loewe	My Fair Lady	3:43
2.	"If Love Were All"	Noël Coward	Broadway's Fair Julie	2:17
3.	"I Don't Care"	Jean Lenox, Harry O. Sutton	Don't Go in the Lion's Cage Tonight	2:51
4.	"Oh Dear What Can The Matter Be"	Traditional	Julie and Carol at Carnegie Hall	4:20
5.	"Alexander's Ragtime Band"	Irving Berlin	Don't Go in the Lion's Cage Tonight	2:21
6.	"Without You"	A. J. Lerner, F. Loewe	My Fair Lady	2:05
7.	"This Is New"	Ira Gershwin, Kurt Weill	Broadway's Fair Julie	2:31
8.	"Don't Go In The Lion's Cage Tonight"	E. Ray Goetz, John Gilroy	Don't Go in the Lion's Cage Tonight	2:48
9.	"By The Light Of The Silvery Moon"	Edward Madden, Gus Edwards	Don't Go in the Lion's Cage Tonight	2:59
10.	"Burlington Bertie from Bow"	William Hargreaves	Don't Go in the Lion's Cage Tonight	3:15
11.	"Wouldn't It Be Loverly"	A. J. Lerner, F. Loewe	My Fair Lady	3:58
12.	"The Honeysuckle And The Bee"	Albert Henry Fitz, William H. Penn	Don't Go in the Lion's Cage Tonight	3:36
13.	"Baubles, Bangles And Beads"	George Forrest, Robert Wright	Broadway's Fair Julie	2:25
14.	"Everybody's Doin' It Now"	I. Berlin	Don't Go in the Lion's Cage Tonight	2:04
15.	"Smarty"	Albert Von Tilzer, Jack Norworth	Don't Go in the Lion's Cage Tonight	2:40
16.	"How Long Has This Been Going On?"	I. Gershwin, G. Gershwin	Broadway's Fair Julie	2:28
17.	"Who Threw The Overalls In Mistress Murphy's Chowder?"	George L. Geifer	Don't Go in the Lion's Cage Tonight	2:24
18.	"Just You Wait"	A. J. Lerner, F. Loewe	My Fair Lady	2:48
19.	"I Didn't Know What Time It Was"	Lorenz Hart, Richard Rodgers	Broadway's Fair Julie	2:35
20.	"She Is More To Be Pitied Than Censured"	William B. Gray	Don't Go in the Lion's Cage Tonight	3:55

== Personnel ==
Credits adapted from the liner notes of The Best of Julie Andrews record.

- Arranged and conducted by Robert Mersey (tracks: A3, A5, B3 to B5, C2, C4, C5, D2, D5)
- Photography by (album Cover) Bruce McBroom
- Photography by (inside cover] Zoë Dominic
- Produced by: Goddard Lieberson (tracks: A1, B1, C1, D3), Jim Foglesong (tracks: A2 to A5, B2 to B5, C2, C3, C5, D2, D4, D5)
- Sleeve notes by Dom Cerulli
