= A Little Bit of Broadway =

Compilation album by Julie Andrews
- Released: October 1988
- Recorded: 1956–1962
- Genres: Show tune, pop
- Label: Columbia

Julie Andrews chronology
Love, Julie (1987)	A Little Bit of Broadway (1988)	The Sounds of Christmas from Around the World (1990)

A Little Bit of Broadway is a compilation album by English singer and actress Julie Andrews, released by Columbia Records in October 1988. The album brings together recordings from Andrews' tenure with the label, sourced from a variety of soundtracks, solo projects, and studio albums. This collection does not follow a single Broadway show but instead showcases her interpretations of classic songs from musicals like West Side Story and South Pacific.

The compilation is notable for including the previously unreleased track "I'll Follow My Secret Heart". Its release coincided with the industry's shift to the compact disc (CD) format, which allowed labels like Columbia to reissue and preserve historical recordings, making this diverse collection of performances widely available for the first time. The album received positive critical reception, with praise for Andrews' vocal performances, though some reviewers noted its nature as a compilation lacked the cohesion of a traditional cast album.

== Album details ==
The album features recordings from Broadway musicals that Andrews performed during her tenure at Columbia between 1957 and 1962. These recordings originate from multiple sources, including the television soundtrack of Cinderella (1957), the London cast album of My Fair Lady (1959), the original Broadway cast album of Camelot (1960), and two solo studio albums: Broadway's Fair Julie (1962) and Don't Go in the Lion's Cage Tonight and Other Heartrending Ballads and Raucous Ditties (1962). The selection does not strictly follow the original Broadway recordings but instead compiles various performances that reflect Andrews' extensive engagement with musical theater during that period.

The compilation includes well-known Broadway songs such as "I Feel Pretty" from West Side Story and "A Wonderful Guy" from South Pacific. Additionally, the album features Andrews' rendition of "How Are Things in Glocca Morra?" from Finian's Rainbow and "I Didn't Know What Time It Was" from Too Many Girls. A notable inclusion is the previously unreleased recording of "I'll Follow My Secret Heart" from Noël Coward's Conversation Piece, an unreleased track from Broadway's Fair July. The album thus brings together a variety of Andrews' performances in a way that was not previously accessible in a single collection.

== Release ==
The release coincided with the increasing popularity of the compact disc (CD) format. CDs had started replacing LP records and cassette tapes due to their improved sound quality, durability, and convenience. Record labels like RCA and Columbia capitalized on the shift to CDs by reissuing long-unavailable Broadway and film soundtracks, with Columbia alone releasing 17 cast and soundtrack recordings in 1988, signaling renewed industry interest in preserving musical theater catalogs

== Critical reception ==
Professional ratings
Review scores
Source	Rating
AllMusic	4.5/5 stars
Los Angeles Times	3.5/5 stars

William Ruhlmann of AllMusic commended Andrews' vocal precision and the historical significance of the recordings. He emphasized the compilation's ability to highlight Andrews' range, from her early Broadway performances to independent recordings that showcased her versatility.

Don Heckman of the Los Angeles Times acknowledged the value of the collection but pointed out that the mix of different recordings resulted in a compilation that lacked the cohesion of a traditional Broadway cast album. He also noted that while the CD format allowed for better preservation of these recordings, some listeners might have preferred the original cast versions rather than a selection from different projects.

In a report on the release of CDs by artists linked to Broadway, David Patrick Stearns of USA Today considered Andrews' collection "a terrific anthology" and stated that the singer shows surprising range and depth in the songs.

== Track listing ==
No.	Title	Writer(s)	Original album	Length
1.	"In My Own Little Corner"	Oscar Hammerstein II / Richard Rodgers	Cinderella	3:42
2.	"I Feel Pretty"	Leonard Bernstein / Stephen Sondheim	Broadway's Fair Julie	2:56
3.	"By the Light of the Silvery Moon"	Gus Edwards / Edward Madden	Don't Go in the Lion's Cage Tonight	2:59
4.	"The Lusty Month of May"	Alan Jay Lerner / Frederick Loewe	Cinderella	2:57
5.	"Baubles, Bangles and Beads"	Alexander Borodin / George Forrest / Robert Wright	Broadway's Fair Julie	2:25
6.	"I'll Follow My Secret Heart"	Noël Coward	Previously unreleased*	2:15
7.	"Wouldn't It Be Loverly?"	Alan Jay Lerner / Frederick Loewe	My Fair Lady	3:57
8.	"Alexander's Ragtime Band"	Irving Berlin	Don't Go in the Lion's Cage Tonight	2:20
9.	"A Little Bit in Love"	Betty Comden / Adolph Green	Broadway's Fair Julie	3:37
10.	"How Are Things in Glocca Morra?"	E.Y. "Yip" Harburg / Burton Lane	Broadway's Fair Julie	2:43
11.	"How Can I Wait?"	Frederick Loewe	Broadway's Fair Julie	2:02
12.	"A Lovely Night"	Oscar Hammerstein II / Richard Rodgers	Broadway's Fair Julie	2:08
13.	"Burlington Bertie from Bow"	William Hargreaves	Don't Go in the Lion's Cage Tonight	3:14
14.	"I Loved You Once in Silence"	Alan Jay Lerner / Frederick Loewe	Camelot	3:03
15.	"I Didn't Know What Time It Was"	Lorenz Hart / Richard Rodgers	Broadway's Fair Julie	2:35
16.	"I Could Have Danced All Night"	Alan Jay Lerner / Frederick Loewe	My Fair Lady	3:45

== Personnel ==
Adapted from the album's liner notes.

- Produced by Didier C. Deutsch
- Digitally mixed and mastered by Mark Wilder
- Executive producer: Mike Berniker
- Project coordinator: Gary Pacheco
- Art direction: Rico Lins
- Photographs courtesy of Stanley Green, Lester Glassner, Friedman-Abeles, Don Hustein.
