= A Little Bit in Love (Julie Andrews album) =

Compilation album by Julie Andrews
- Released: September 1970
- Genre: Show tune, pop
- Label: Harmony

Julie Andrews chronology
Darling Lili (1969)	A Little Bit in Love (1970)	Julie and Carol at Lincoln Center (1971)

A Little Bit in Love is a compilation album released in September 1970 by English actress and singer Julie Andrews, under Columbia Records' budget label Harmony. The album compiles recordings made by Andrews for Columbia Records in the early 1960s. The album predominantly features songs from Broadway musicals, although not specifically from productions in which Julie Andrews performed. The songs were occasionally accompanied by a barbershop quartet.

== Recording history ==
The compilation assembles a discerning selection of performances drawn from two prior studio albums: Broadway's Fair Julie and Don't Go in the Lion's Cage Tonight and Other Heartrending Ballads and Raucous Ditties. The tracks "A Little Bit in Love", "I Feel Pretty", "How Can I Wait", "If Love Were All", "This Is New", and "Looking for a Boy" first appeared on Broadway's Fair Julie (1962), illustrating Andrews's engagement with the Broadway musical canon.

In parallel, the selections "Burlington Bertie from Bow", "Waiting at the Church (My Wife Won't Let Me)", and "By the Light of the Silvery Moon", originating from Don't Go in the Lion's Cage Tonight and Other Heartrending Ballads and Raucous Ditties (1962), reflect a turn towards traditional British music hall and vaudeville traditions.

== Critical reception ==
Professional ratings
Review scores
Source	Rating
AllMusic	4/5 stars
Billboard	4/4 stars

AllMusic critic William Ruhlmann wrote that the combined album "provides a well-rounded look at a major talent in her prime", noting that Julie Andrews “"rendered such material effectively in her warm voice with its precise intonation", even if she was "a bit less effective"” on some character songs.

== Commercial performance ==
The album appeared in the September 12, 1970, edition of Billboard, in the 4 Stars section for Low Price Popular albums. This section highlights promising releases recommended by the magazine. Despite this, the album failed to appear on the magazine's charts.

== Track listing ==
No.	Title	Writer(s)	Original Album	Length
1.	"A Little Bit in Love"	Betty Comden, Adolph Green, Leonard Bernstein	Broadway's Fair Julie	3:33
2.	"I Feel Pretty"	Leonard Bernstein, Stephen Sondheim	Broadway's Fair Julie	1:56
3.	"How Can I Wait"	Alan Jay Lerner, Frederick Loewe	Broadway's Fair Julie	2:03
4.	"Burlington Bertie from Bow"	William Hargreaves	Don't Go in the Lion's Cage Tonight	3:15
5.	"If Love Were All"	Noël Coward	Broadway's Fair Julie	2:17
6.	"This Is New"	Ira Gershwin, Kurt Weill	Broadway's Fair Julie	2:30
7.	"Waiting at the Church (My Wife Won't Let Me)"	Fred W. Leigh, Henry E. Pether	Don't Go in the Lion's Cage Tonight	2:38
8.	"Looking for a Boy"	Ira Gershwin, George Gershwin	Broadway's Fair Julie	2:53
9.	"By the Light of the Silvery Moon"	Edward Madden, Gus Edwards	Don't Go in the Lion's Cage Tonight	2:59

== Personnel ==
Credits adapted from the liner notes of A Little Bit In Love record.

- Liner Notes – Shaun Considine
- Photography by (Cover Photo) – James Moore
