= Don't Go in the Lion's Cage Tonight and Other Heartrending Ballads and Raucous Ditties =

Studio album by Julie Andrews
- Released: 1962
- Genre: Show tune
- Length: 34:42
- Label: Columbia
- Producer: Jim Foglesong

Julie Andrews chronology
Broadway's Fair Julie (1961)	Don't Go in the Lion's Cage Tonight and Other Heartrending Ballads and Raucous Ditties (1962)	Julie and Carol at Carnegie Hall (1962)

Don't Go in the Lion's Cage Tonight and Other Heartrending Ballads and Raucous Ditties (It's also called simply Don't Go in the Lion's Cage Tonight by most media outlets or even Heartrending Ballads and Raucous Ditties) is the forth solo studio album by English actress and singer Julie Andrews, released in 1962 by Columbia Records. The album features a collection of vaudeville and music hall songs dating from the 1890s to the 1910s. Recorded while Andrews was expecting her first child, the project marked a moment when she was temporarily absent from stage and film work. It presented a different musical direction from her previous release, Broadway's Fair Julie drawing inspiration from early 20th-century popular entertainment.

The tracklist spans sentimental ballads and comic pieces, including "By the Light of the Silvery Moon", "She is More to Be Pitied than Censured", and "The Honeysuckle and the Bee". Songs such as "Mother Was a Lady" and "Who Threw the Overalls in Mrs. Murphy's Chowder?" evoke the humor and character of the music hall era, while "Waiting at the Church" and "Burlington Bertie from Bow" feature Andrews performing with a Cockney accent. The album also includes two compositions by Irving Berlin, "Everybody’s Doin' It Now" and "Alexander's Ragtime Band", arranged by Robert Mersey, who provided the orchestral and vocal settings throughout the record.

Upon its release, Don't Go in the Lion's Cage Tonight received attention for its distinctive concept and period material. Publications such as Billboard and Cash Box remarked on the arrangements and Andrews's vocal delivery, while Record World later commented on the title track's release as a single in 1967. The album did not charted.

== Album details ==
The album features a collection of vaudeville and music hall songs, with copyright dates ranging from the 1890s to the 1910s. Andrews, who was expecting her first child at the time, turned to the recording studio as she was unavailable for stage or screen performances. The album showcases her versatility, moving away from the theater ballads of her previous album, Broadway's Fair Julie, to embrace a more playful and comedic style.

The tracklist includes songs that explore a variety of themes, such as the "lively" "By the Light of the Silvery Moon" (1909), the "dramatic" "She is More to Be Pitied Than Censured", which tells the story of a young woman fallen from grace, and the "comedic" "The Honeysuckle and the Bee" (1901), featuring playful brass arrangements. Also notable are "Mother Was a Lady" (1896), a parody of the "good-girl song" style, and the politically incorrect "Who Threw the Overalls in Mrs. Murphy's Chowder?" (1898). Andrews adopts a cockney accent in "Waiting at the Church," a song about a bride left at the altar, and delivers spirited performances of "Smarty" (1908) and "Burlington Bertie from Bow", the latter being a parody of a 1900 song titled "Burlington Bertie". The album also features two compositions by Irving Berlin: "Everybody's Doin' It Now" and "Alexander's Ragtime Band", the latter showcasing an arrangement by Mersey.

== Single ==
The title track of the album was released as a single only in 1967. Record World magazine gave it a four-star rating, describing it as "a marvelous tongue-in-cheek recording", while also considering the album itself to be "great". The same magazine noted that Andrews had other albums on the market, but as she never had a fixed contract with any record company, Columbia decided to release the single. By 1962, Andrews recorded for several major labels, including Decca, RCA Victor, Columbia, and Angel Records.

== CD releases ==
The album was re-released on CD twice. The first reissue (released only in Spain) came in 1995 under the Sony Music Special Marketing label, part of CBS/Sony. This edition was a 2-in-1 compilation, featuring Julie Andrews' previous album, Broadway's Fair Julie, on the same CD. In 2015, Él Records, a subsidiary of Cherry Red Records, reissued the compilation once again, adding four bonus tracks from the 1954 cast recording The Boy Friend, starring Andrews. In total, this version contains 28 tracks. Ten of the album's twelve songs were included on the compilation The Best of Julie Andrews (1972), released on CD in 1994 (#983403 2).

== Critical reception ==
Professional ratings
Review scores
Source	Rating
AllMusic	4/5 stars

Cash Box highlighted Andrews' "electrifying, wide-range delivery" and the "first-rate arrangements" that backed her performance. Billboard echoed this sentiment, describing Andrews as "gushing talent" on the "wonderful" tracks, and emphasized the "standout backing" provided by Bob Mersey's arrangements.

William Ruhlmann of AllMusic described the album as "a delightful collection" that "must have been as much of a hoot to record as it was to listen to", highlighting Julie Andrews' evident "feel for this kind of material". In his Playbill article titled "From 'Mary Poppins' to 'Victor/Victoria': The Julie Andrews Albums Every Fan Should Own", Ben Rimalower noted the album as "something more unique and surprising", praising how Julie Andrews "brings a joyous bite along with her luscious voice to every tune".

== Commercial performance ==
According to Robert Windeler, writer of Julie Andrews — A Biography, Andrews's solo albums released between the late 1950s and early 1960s, like Don't Go in the Lion's Cage Tonight and Other Heartrending Ballads and Raucous Ditties, did not chart, which prevented her from making more albums later on.

== Track listing ==
No.	Title	Writer(s)	Length
1.	"I Don't Care"	H. O. Sutton, Jean Lenox	2:52
2.	"The Honeysuckle And The Bee"	Albert Henry Fitz, William H. Penn	3:38
3.	"Mother Was A Lady (If Jack Were Only Here)"	Edward B. Marks, Joseph W. Stern	3:30
4.	"Who Threw The Overalls In Mistress Murphy's Chowder?"	George L. Geifer	2:25
5.	"Everybody's Doin' It Now"	Irving Berlin	2:04
6.	"Waiting At The Church (My Wife Won't Let Me)"	Fred W. Leigh, Henry E. Pether	2:38
7.	"Don't Go In the Lion's Cage Tonight"	E. Ray Goetz, John Gilroy	2:47
8.	"Burlington Bertie From Bow"	William Hargreaves	3:15
9.	"Alexander's Ragtime Band"	I. Berlin	2:20
10.	"By The Light Of The Silvery Moon"	Edward Madden, Gus Edwards	2:59
11.	"Smarty"	Albert Von Tilzer, Jack Norworth	2:40
12.	"She Is More To Be Pitied Than Censured"	William B. Gray	3:54

== Personnel ==
Credits adapted from the liner notes of Rose-Marie cast record.

- Arranged and conducted by Robert Mersey
- Produced by Jim Foglesong
- Album cover photography by Bob Cato
- Artwork by Chas B Slackman
- Backing Vocals by The Quartones
