= The Sounds of Christmas from Around the World =

Studio album by Julie Andrews
- Released: 1990
- Genre: Christmas
- Label: Hallmark

Julie Andrews chronology
A Little Bit of Broadway (1988)	The Sounds of Christmas from Around the World (1990)	The King and I (1992)

The Sounds of Christmas from Around the World is a 1990 Christmas album by Julie Andrews, released as a limited edition through Hallmark stores. Recorded in London with the London Symphony Orchestra, the Ambrosian Boys Choir, and guitarist Christopher Parkening, the album was Hallmark's first choice for their annual seasonal offering. Its tracklist reflects the title by featuring a collection of traditional Christmas music and carols originating from various countries.

The album was the sixth in Hallmark's series of Christmas music releases and was sold exclusively to their customers. As a result, it did not appear on standard music charts, but sold nearly two million copies, representing a significant increase over the sales of the series' first album. It received a favorable review and sold nearly 2 million copies.

== Album details ==
Recorded in London in April 1989, it marked Andrews as Hallmark's first choice for their annual seasonal offering. Featuring collaborations with Christopher Parkening, the Ambrosian Boys Choir, and the London Symphony Orchestra, the album blends traditional favorites with lesser-known international carols, including a medley of European lullabies. The phrase from Around the World in the title reflects the album's tracklist, which features Christmas songs and carols from various countries. Exclusively available to Hallmark customers as an add-on purchase, the album was offered on vinyl, cassette, and CD formats.

"The Sound of Christmas" was also the title of Andrews' 1987 ABC Christmas special, which won an award as best "Lighting Direction for a Variety-Music or Drama Series, Miniseries or Special" at the 40th Primetime Emmy Awards. However, none of the songs from The Sounds of Christmas from Around the World album were featured in the special. That same year, her 1975 album The Secret of Christmas was reissued as The Sound of Christmas. This re-release included two tracks—"Silent Night" and "The Sound of Christmas"—which had previously appeared on the 1982 U.S. reissue titled Christmas with Julie Andrews. While these songs were similar to the versions on Hallmark's album, they were different recordings.

== Critical reception ==
The Northwest Florida Daily News's music critic highlighted The Sounds of Christmas from Around the World in his newspaper column, writing that the 1990 Hallmark release offers something for everyone, since the album includes beloved classics like "Have Yourself a Merry Little Christmas" (USA), "Silent Night" (Austria), and "Jesu, Joy of Man's Desiring" (Germany), as well as festive tunes from Russia, France, and a European medley.

== Commercial performance ==
The album is the sixth edition in the Hallmark series of Christmas music albums, and since it was released exclusively in Hallmark stores, it did not appear on the Billboard music charts. However, according to RPM magazine, by November 16, 1991, The Sounds of Christmas from Around the World had sold nearly 2 million copies—a 300% increase compared to Hallmark's first Christmas album, released in 1984, which sold over 500,000 copies.

== Track listing ==
The Sounds of Christmas from Around the World
No.	Title	Writer(s)	Length
1.	"The Sound of Christmas"
2.	"Noel Nouvelet / Il est né, le divin Enfant"	Traditional French carols
3.	"Silent Night"	Franz Xaver Gruber, Joseph Mohr
4.	"A European Lullaby Medley"	Traditional (various European origins)
5.	"Ding Dong Merrily on High"	Traditional French melody, English lyrics by George Ratcliffe Woodward
6.	"This Is Christmas"
7.	"Jesu, Joy of Man's Desiring"	Johann Sebastian Bach (arranged from Herz und Mund und Tat und Leben, BWV 147)
8.	"Sweet Little Jesus Boy"	Robert MacGimsey
9.	"The Dance of the Sugar Plum Fairy"	Pyotr Ilyich Tchaikovsky (from The Nutcracker)
10.	"Have Yourself a Merry Little Christmas"	Hugh Martin, Ralph Blane
11.	"Sleigh Ride"	Leroy Anderson, lyrics by Mitchell Parish

== Personnel ==
Credits adapted from the liner notes of The Sounds Of Christmas from Around The World record.

- Arranged by Ian Fraser
- Conducted by Ian Fraser
- Music supervised by Fred Salem
- Executive produced by Dick Carter
- Choir by Ambrosian Boys' Choir
- Orchestra by London Symphony Orchestra
- Acoustic guitar by Christopher Parkening
- Design by David Reynolds
- Typography by Kevin Horvath
