= Broadway's Fair Julie =

Studio album by Julie Andrews
- Released: 1961
- Genre: Show tune
- Label: Columbia

Julie Andrews chronology
Camelot (1960)	Broadway's Fair Julie (1961)	Don't Go in the Lion's Cage Tonight (1962)

Broadway's Fair Julie is the third solo studio album by English actress and singer Julie Andrews, released in 1961 by Columbia Records. The album features Andrews performing a curated selection of Broadway show tunes, accompanied by Henri René & His Orchestra. Recorded during a transitional phase in her career, it followed her acclaimed stage successes in My Fair Lady and Camelot and coincided with her pregnancy with her daughter, Emma.

The record comprises twelve tracks which includes both celebrated and lesser-known songs from the Broadway repertoire, such as West Side Story, Kismet and Finian's Rainbow. Upon release, it received favorable notices from critics, who praised Andrews's vocal precision and the orchestral production. Commercially, it failed to chart.

== Background and recording ==
Broadway's Fair Julie features Andrews performing a selection of Broadway show tunes, accompanied by Henri René & His Orchestra. The project followed her success in the Broadway musicals My Fair Lady and Camelot and coincided with her pregnancy, as she gave birth to her daughter, Emma Kate Walton, later that year.

The album was produced during a time when Andrews was exploring opportunities beyond the stage, as she transitioned toward film roles. It allowed her to record songs she had not performed in her stage career. The orchestral arrangements by Henri René provide a backdrop to the selections, which range from upbeat show tunes to more introspective ballads.

== Album details ==
The album showcase the diversity of mid-20th century Broadway, including songs by composers such as Leonard Bernstein, Richard Rodgers, and Kurt Weill, among others. It consists of 12 tracks, drawing from a variety of musicals, like West Side Story, Kismet, and Finian's Rainbow, among others.

The tracklist includes both well-known and lesser-known songs from the Broadway repertoire. Andrews opens the album with "Looking for a Boy" from Tip-Toes, followed by renditions of songs such as "I Feel Pretty" from West Side Story and "Baubles, Bangles and Beads" from Kismet. Also featuring is "How Are Things in Glocca Morra" from Finian's Rainbow and "A Sleepin’ Bee" from House of Flowers, the latter of which was originally performed in a West Indian dialect that Andrews adapted to her own vocal style. The closing track, "If Love Were All," is from Noël Coward's Bitter Sweet. A previously unreleased track, "I'll Follow My Secret Heart", can be found in Andrew's compilation album A Little Bit of Broadway (1988).

== Releases ==
In Japan, where Broadway's Fair Julie was not released, CBS issued a compilation album in 1965 titled Broadway's Hits (#YS-495-C), featuring twelve tracks. This collection included ten of the twelve songs from the original album, replacing "Looking for a Boy" and "If Love Were All" with "Wouldn't It Be Loverly" and "I Could Have Danced All Night", taken from the original cast recording of My Fair Lady. In 1972, Harmony Records re-released the album, now titled T.V.'s Fair Julie, with two fewer songs: "This Is New" and "If Love Were All" (#KH 31958).

The album was re-released on CD three times. The first reissue (released only in Spain) came in 1995 under the Sony Music Special Marketing label, part of CBS/Sony. This edition was a 2-in-1 compilation, featuring Julie Andrews' later album, Don't Go in the Lion's Cage Tonight and Other Heartrending Ballads and Raucous Ditties, on the same CD. William Ruhlmann from AllMusic rated the album four out five stars and wrote a favorable review. In 2015, Él Records, a subsidiary of Cherry Red Records, reissued the compilation once again, adding four bonus tracks from the 1954 cast recording The Boy Friend, starring Andrews. In total, this version contains 28 tracks. In 2012, Hallmark Records released the album in its entirety and individually, with the original cover art.

== Critical reception ==
Professional ratings
Review scores
Source	Rating
AllMusic	3/5 stars

Billboard praised Julie Andrews's performance for "excellent results" and highlighted Henri René's "neatly" filled orchestration, also noting that the album cover was "a solid asset". Similarly, Cash Box described it as an "excellent Columbia package", praising Julie Andrews' "perfectly-accentuated tones" and noting her voice is "in superb form" with "exceptional orchestral backing". Star-News considered the album a "fine record" and highlighted the "warmth and tenderness" Andrews brings to her performances, especially in "Looking for a Boy" and "I Didn't Know What Time It Was".

William Ruhlmann of AllMusic concluded that the album was "a successful outing on the whole", noting Julie Andrews brought her "customary warmth and sympathy" despite "her familiar style, with the proper British accent, the precise intonation, and the ease of phrasing, was better suited to some of these songs than it was to others". The Second Disc described the album as "a title which describes the legendary performer, then and now", praising Julie Andrews as "a bit more refined [than in her previous album]", while delivering "elegantly-sung takes on theatre songs".

In his Playbill article titled "From 'Mary Poppins' to 'Victor/Victoria': The Julie Andrews Albums Every Fan Should Own", Ben Rimalower praised the album as a "handsome 1961 solo album production", noting that Andrews "proves once again to be in a class by herself" with "sumptuous arrangements of Broadway standards".

== Commercial performance ==
According to Robert Windeler, writer of Julie Andrews — A Biography, Andrews's solo albums released between the late 1950s and early 1960s, like Broadway's Fair Julie, did not do well in sales. The singer said in a Music-Business magazine's interview: "I love recording and I want to do a lot more of it. But the problem is to find a happy medium between what you as an artist want to do and what your public wants you to do. It seems I'm lucky with the show albums but I'll have to keep looking for an answer on the kind where I'm alone". According to Windeler, the limited sales prevented the singer from making more albums later on.

== Track listing ==
Side A
No.	Title	Writer(s)	Length
1.	"Looking for a Boy" (from Tip-Toes)	Ira Gershwin, George Gershwin	2:53
2.	"How Long Has This Been Going On?" (from Rosalie)	I. Gershwin, G. Gershwin	2:26
3.	"I Feel Pretty" (from West Side Story)	Leonard Bernstein, Stephen Sondheim	1:56
4.	"A Sleepin' Bee" (from House of Flowers)	Harold Arlen, Truman Capote	3:04
5.	"Baubles, Bangles and Beads" (from Kismet)	George Forrest, Robert Wright	2:25
6.	"How Are Things in Glocca Morra?" (from Finian's Rainbow)	Burton Lane, Yip Harburg	2:34

Side B
No.	Title	Writer(s)	Length
1.	"A Little Bit in Love" (from Wonderful Town)	Betty Comden, Adolph Green	3:33
2.	"This Is New" (from Lady in the Dark)	I. Gershwin, Kurt Weill	2:30
3.	"A Fellow Needs A Girl" (from Allegro)	Oscar Hammerstein II, Richard Rodgers	2:19
4.	"How Can I Wait" (from Paint Your Wagon)	Alan Jay Lerner, Frederick Loewe	2:03
5.	"I Didn't Know What Time It Was" (from Too Many Girls)	Lorenz Hart, R. Rodgers	2:34
6.	"If Love Were All" (from Bitter Sweet)	Noël Coward	2:17

== Personnel ==
Credits adapted from the liner notes of Broadway's Fair Julie.

- Featuring [With] – Henri René And His Orchestra
- Photography By [Photo] – Richard Avedon
- Producer – James Foglesong*
