= Julie and Carol at Lincoln Center (album) =

Cast recording by Julie Andrews, Carol Burnett
- Released: 1971
- Genre: Show tune, folk
- Label: Columbia Masterworks

Julie Andrews chronology
A Little Bit in Love (1970)	Julie and Carol at Lincoln Center (1971)	The Best of Julie Andrews (1972)

Julie and Carol at Lincoln Center is a live cast album released by Columbia Masterworks documenting the 1971 CBS television special featuring Julie Andrews and Carol Burnett.

The recording features a combination of musical numbers and comedy sketches, including a medley of 1960s pop, soul, and Broadway songs, performed in a live, vaudeville-style format. Critics noted the duo's dynamic chemistry and energetic delivery, highlighting the medley of '60s songs as a central feature.

In 2012, the album was reissued as part of a remastered double-CD edition alongside Julie and Carol at Carnegie Hall, marking its first official CD release.

== Album details ==
The album preserves the 1971 television special as a live album, capturing Andrews and Burnett in a brisk, vaudeville-style performance. The recording features a mix of scripted comedy bits and musical numbers, anchored by a sprawling 46-song medley of 1960s pop hits—ranging from rock ("Sgt. Pepper's Lonely Hearts Club Band") to soul ("Son of a Preacher Man") and Broadway ("Aquarius").

The arrangements, overseen by Ken and Mitzi Welch, lean toward light orchestral pop, with Andrews' polished soprano contrasting Burnett's looser, comedic delivery. Outside the medley, the tracklist includes nostalgic detours like the Tin Pan Alley standard "Wait 'Till the Sun Shines, Nellie and a reprise of "I Could Have Danced All Night" from My Fair Lady. While the album documents the duo's Emmy-nominated chemistry, its appeal hinges largely on nostalgia for the era’s variety-show aesthetics, with minimal studio embellishment to the live recordings.

== CD release ==
While the original cast album Julie and Carol at Carnegie Hall was briefly issued on CD in 1989, Julie and Carol at Lincoln Center remained unreleased in the format till a remastered double-CD edition was released in 2012, combining both performances for the first time. The 2012 reissue, titled The CBS Television Specials: Live at Carnegie Hall/Live at Lincoln Center, marked the CD debut of the Lincoln Center concert and restored the original recordings. This compilation preserved the duo's legacy, offering a comprehensive look at their collaborative work.

== Critical reception ==
Professional ratings
Review scores
Source	Rating
AllMusic	3/5 stars

Billboard noted that "the highly rated television special that teamed these two super stars will be kept alive with this recording", adding that "the musical material brilliantly pays them, which is delivered brilliantly by the team". Record World noted that "the girls are effervescent throughout", highlighting a "terrific, all-encompassing medley of '60s songs" and concluding that the album is "full of cheer". Cash Box highlighted "a 47 song medley of the top songs of the '60s" as the album's centerpiece, calling it "a flattering reminder of the Mary Martin–Ethel Merman TV medley" and praising the duo as "two talented charmers in comedy and song".

== Track listing ==
No.	Title	Writer(s)	Performer(s)	Length
1.	"Opening"		Julie Andrews and Carol Burnett	1:04
2.	"Our Classy, Classical Show"	Ken Welch, Mike Welch	Julie Andrews and Carol Burnett	5:04
3.	"Girls In The Band"	Ken Welch, Mike Welch	Julie Andrews and Carol Burnett	6:16
4.	"Madame Abernall's / I Could Have Danced All Night"	Ken Welch, Mike Welch / Frederick Loewe, Alan Jay Lerner	Julie Andrews and Carol Burnett	8:21
5.	"He's Gone Away"	Ken Welch, Mike Welch	Julie Andrews	4:08
6.	"Medley of The '60s"	Various	Julie Andrews and Carol Burnett	14:17
7.	"Wait Till The Sun Shines Nellie"	Harry Von Tilzer, Andrew B. Sterling	Julie Andrews and Carol Burnett	3:34
8.	"Finale"		Julie Andrews and Carol Burnett	2:02

== Personnel ==
Credits adapted from the liner notes of Julie and Carol at Carnegie Hall record.

- Producer: Joe Hamilton
- Director: Dave Powers
- Conductor/Arranger: Peter Matz
- Associate Producer: Bob Wright
- Musical treatments and special material: Ken and Mitzie Welch
- Art director: Paul Barnes
- Music cordinator: Dick DeBenedictis
- Audio: B. A. Taylor and Art Shine
- For Philharmonic Hall: Patrick McGuinnes
- Cover photo: Irv Haberman
