= Ella Shields =

American singer

- Shields c. 1928

Background information
- Also known as: Burlington Bertie
- Born: Ella Catherine Buscher; September 27, 1879; Baltimore, Maryland, U.S.
- Died: August 5, 1952 (aged 72) Lancaster, Lancashire, England
- Genre: Music hall
- Years active: 1898–1952
- Spouse(s): John Thomas Keaveney (m. 1895, divorced) Theodore Darwin Middaugh (m. 1900; div. 1904) William Hargreaves (m. 1906; div. 1923) Frederick S. Buck (m. 1924)
- Children: 1; Susan Catherine Middaugh

Ella Shields (born Ella Catherine Buscher; 27 September 1879 – 5 August 1952) was a music hall singer and male-impersonator. Her famous signature song, "Burlington Bertie from Bow", a parody of Vesta Tilley's "Burlington Bertie", written by her third husband, William Hargreaves, was an immediate hit. Though American-born, Shields achieved her greatest success in England.

== Background and early life ==
Ella Catherine Buscher was born in Baltimore, Maryland, on September 26, 1879. She was educated in South Bend, Indiana. She adopted the stage name, "Ella Shields," around 1898.

She married John Thomas Keaveney on November 24, 1895 in Manhattan. That marriage ended in divorce. Her second marriage was to Theodore Darwin Middaugh, a theatrical tour manager and musician from Friendship, New York. She gave birth to a daughter, Susan Catherine Middaugh on September 15, 1899 in Friendship.

She and Middaugh divorced on April 13, 1904. Susan Middaugh was raised in Friendship. Ella made fairly regular trips back to Buffalo, New York to perform and visit her throughout her life. Ella's third marriage, to composer William Hargreaves, was in 1906 after she moved to England. She divorced Hargreaves in 1923. Her fourth marriage, on March 7, 1924, was to a man 20+ years her junior, Frederick S. Buck, in New York, during a short 3 city tour of Philadelphia, New York and Buffalo. She may have still been married to Buck at the time of her death in 1952. There are two other marriages mentioned in newspaper articles (Army Officer Archibald Christie, Chandler Andrew Sharpe) but they are in error.

== Career ==
Ella Shields performing her signature song "Burlington Bertie from Bow"

Shields began her career in 1898, doing a vaudeville song-and-dance act with her sisters. In 1904 a talent scout lured her to London, where she was billed as the "Southern Nightingale". In 1906 she married the songwriter William Joseph Hargreaves in Lambeth, London. In 1910 she appeared at the opening night of the London Palladium. It was at this time that she became a male impersonator. The story goes that one night in 1910 Shields was attending a party at which music-hall performers did their acts for one another. Half of a two-man musical act was out sick, and Shields put on trousers to fill in for him. This impromptu turn in trousers proved to be the turning point of her career and she rarely wore dresses on stage again.

With wavy auburn hair and dressed as a young man in evening dress, nervously fingering his white tie, she made a very charming and gay figure ... and though she adopted the tattered clothes and worn top hat of the traditional "broken down swell" act she did so with a difference, making of what might have been ordinary broad comedy something delicate and, in its way, almost moving.

— Obituary, The Times

In 1915 Hargreaves wrote "Burlington Bertie from Bow", a comic ditty about a penniless Londoner who affects the manner of a well-heeled gentleman. It was a parody of an earlier song, simply called "Burlington Bertie", written by Harry B. Norris and made famous by Vesta Tilley. Shields sang the song, dressed up in slightly battered top hat and tails, in the role of Burlington Bertie "himself". She toured the world in this role, including appearances at Baltimore's now-demolished Maryland Theatre in 1924 and 1926. The persona of Bertie haunted the rest of her life and she was known as Bertie as much as Ella. She and Hargreaves had separated in 1916 and they divorced in 1923.

The Depression brought difficult times for many entertainers, and Shields announced her retirement in 1929. She spent time working at a Macy's jewellery counter in New York. After a period of performing in obscurity, a music-hall reunion show called Thanks for the Memory put "Bertie" back in the spotlight. This show ran throughout England for over three years from 1947 to 1952.

Shields worked with many stars over the years, including a very young Julie Andrews in the late 1940s with whom she shared the same bill of a Royal Command Performance. Julie Andrews pays tribute to Shields in her own one-woman show and has recorded Shields' famous song "Burlington Bertie from Bow". It is possible that Julie Andrews used Shields as her role model for "Victor" in the film and stage musical Victor/Victoria.

== Death ==
In August 1952, a septuagenarian Shields performed in northern England. Her death was dramatic. Singing her trademark song, in what would be her final show, instead of the traditional opening line "I'm Burlington Bertie", she began with "I was Burlington Bertie". After finishing the song she collapsed on stage and died three days later, without regaining consciousness, at Lancaster in Lancashire, on 5 August 1952. Her body was cremated at Golders Green Crematorium in London. In the crematorium courtyard she shares a memorial plaque with music hall star Nellie Wallace.

== Repertoire ==
Her repertoire of songs was related to her male-impersonation act, which was often in military attire. They included:

- "Burlington Bertie from Bow"
- "Baa Lambs"
- "I'm Walking 'round the World"
- "I Don't Admire the Girl in White (In the Army)"
- "Oh! It's a Lovely War"
- "Coo-ee"
- "Stick to London Town"
- "Adeline"
- "The King's Navee"
- "What a Difference the Navy's Made to Me"
- "Why Did You Creep into My Heart?"
- "Why Did I Kiss That Girl?"
- "I'm Not There At All"
- "All the Nice Girls Are in the Ballroom"
- "Show Me the Way to Go Home"
- "When the Bloom Is on the Heather"
- "If You Knew Susie (Like I Know Susie)"
- "San Francisco"
- "Jolly Good Fellows"
- "I'd Do It All Over Again"
- "Everybody's Singing"
- "Nelly Grey"
