= 10 (soundtrack) =

Soundtrack album by Various artists
- Released: 1979
- Genre: Easy listening
- Label: Warner Bros.

Julie Andrews chronology
An Evening with Julie Andrews (1977)	10 (1979)	Victor/Victoria (1982)

Singles from 10
- 1. "Ravel's Bolero" Released: 1979; 2. "It's Easy to Say (Japan Only)" Released: 1980

10 is an original soundtrack recording of the movie with the same name released in 1979 by Warner Bros. Records. The album was produced by Joe Reisman and features compositions by Henry Mancini. It includes vocal performances by Julie Andrews, such as the track "He Pleases Me", and a duet with Dudley Moore titled "It's Easy to Say". The soundtrack also showcases Moore's piano solo on the latter track and an instrumental version of "Don't Call It Love". The album closes with "Ravel's Bolero", which was released as a single (#WBS 49139) and reached massive sales, generated an estimated $1 million in royalties, and briefly made its composer, Maurice Ravel, the best-selling classical composer 40 years after his death.

The Cash Box review highlighted several key aspects of the 10 soundtrack in their 1979 review. They noted Henry Mancini's memorable theme music, describing it as fitting for the film's "male menopause fantasy" tone. The review singled out Julie Andrews' vocal performance on "He Pleases Me" as suitable for Adult Contemporary (A/C) radio, while also praising the instrumental version of "Don’t Call It Love" and Dudley Moore's piano solo on "It's Easy To Say" as ideal for Beautiful Music stations. The review framed the album as a commercially viable release with crossover appeal across different radio formats.

From a commercial standpoint, 10 debuted at number 104 on the Billboard Top LPs & Tape chart dated January 5, 1980, and peaked at number 80 on January 26. It remained on the chart for a total of nine weeks. On the Cash Box Top Albums chart, the album entered at number 197 on December 22, 1979, and reached a peak position of number 120 on March 1, 1980. It also appeared on the Record World Albums chart, where it peaked at number 177 on February 23, 1980.

In his 2013 article for The Second Disc, Joe Marchese expressed surprise that Henry Mancini's 10 soundtrack had never received a proper U.S. compact disc (CD) release, noting it was only briefly available in Europe in a subpar edition. Marchese highlighted Real Gone Music's reissue as a long-overdue correction, praising its inclusion of Ravel's "Bolero" (a key track from the film) and new liner notes by Frank DeWald. He framed the CD release as essential for Mancini fans, who consider the 10 score among the composer's finest work.

== Track listing ==
10 - Original Motion Picture Sound Track
No.	Title	Writer(s)	Performer(s)	Length
1.	"Don't Call It Love (Main Title) (Instrumental)"	Henry Mancini, Carole Bayer Sager		1:19
2.	"He Pleases Me"	H. Mancini, Robert Wells	Julie Andrews	3:27
3.	"Keyboard Harmony"	H. Mancini		3:14
4.	"It's Easy To Say (With Chorus)"	H. Mancini, R. Wells		2:42
5.	"Something For Jenny"	H. Mancini		2:48
6.	"Don't Call It Love (With Chorus)"	H. Mancini, C. B. Sager		2:58
7.	"Get It On"	H. Mancini		5:13
8.	"It's Easy To Say (Duet)"	H. Mancini	Dudley Moore, Julie Andrews	3:02
9.	"The Hot Sand Mexican Band"	H. Mancini		3:03
10.	"I Have An Ear For Love"	H. Mancini, R. Wells	Max Showalter	2:06
11.	"It's Easy To Say (Instrumental)"	H. Mancini, R. Wells	Dudley Moore (piano)	3:40
12.	"Ravel's Bolero"	M. Ravel		4:58
Total length:				38:30

== Personnel ==
Credits adapted from the liner notes of 10 record.

- Original music composed and conducted by Henry Mancini
- Produced by Joe Reisman

== Charts ==
Weekly chart performance for 10
Chart (1980)	Peak position
US (Billboard Top LPs & Tape)	80
US (Cash Box Top Albums)	120
US (Record World Albums)	177
