= The Pink Panther Strikes Again (soundtrack) =

Soundtrack album by Henry Mancini
- Released: 1976
- Genre: Film score
- Label: United Artists Records
- Producer: Henry Mancini

Henry Mancini chronology
The Cop Show Themes (1975)	The Pink Panther Strikes Again (1976)	Mancini's Angels (1976)

Julie Andrews chronology
The Secret of Christmas (1975)	The Pink Panther Strikes Again (1976)	An Evening with Julie Andrews (1977)

The Pink Panther Strikes Again is the soundtrack album for the 1976 comedy film of the same name, composed and conducted by Henry Mancini. The film is the fifth installment in the Pink Panther series directed by Blake Edwards and starring Peter Sellers as Inspector Jacques Clouseau. The album was originally released in 1976 by United Artists Records and includes a mixture of original compositions and variations on established themes from earlier entries in the series.

As with previous Pink Panther scores, the album builds upon musical themes introduced in The Pink Panther (1963) and A Shot in the Dark (1964), while introducing new material composed specifically for this installment. Among these, Mancini reintroduced "The Inspector Clouseau Theme" and developed new motifs to accompany recurring characters and situations. The score was conceived to match the film's blend of slapstick comedy and spy parody, incorporating jazz, orchestral, and pop elements.

Over the years, The Pink Panther Strikes Again gained attention from soundtrack collectors, particularly due to the partial nature of its original LP release and the absence of a comprehensive edition. Expanded editions were released in 1998, and 2015, by Rykodisc and Quartet Records, respectively, featuring unreleased cues, alternate takes, and improved audio quality.

== Background and development ==
The production of The Pink Panther Strikes Again occurred during a period of creative reconciliation between composer Henry Mancini and director Blake Edwards. As detailed in Mancini's biography, the two had previously experienced tensions during Darling Lili (1969) due to studio interference, but repaired their working relationship through open communication. This collaboration proved vital, as the film demanded a score that could accommodate both the series' traditional jazz sophistication and the need for more overtly comedic musical support.

Mancini faced unique compositional challenges with this installment. While earlier Panther films like A Shot in the Dark (1964) used music sparingly during Clouseau's physical comedy, Strikes Again required a continuous musical presence to underscore its elaborate gags - including slow-motion kung fu fights and a ray gun that makes the United Nations disappear. The composer noted this shift in approach: "I did a little theme for Clouseau, a kind of French melody to lay very noncommittally behind some of his routines". This marked the first time Clouseau received his own dedicated musical identity in the series.

The film's narrative - which involves Chief Inspector Dreyfus (Herbert Lom) escaping an asylum to orchestrate Clouseau's assassination - provided Mancini with opportunities to create diverse musical set pieces. These ranged from German castle intrigue to international espionage, allowing for everything from oompah rhythms to suspenseful action cues.

== Musical style and themes ==
Henry Mancini's score for The Pink Panther Strikes Again represents a careful balancing act between maintaining the series' musical identity and innovating to serve the film's broader comedy. The famous "Pink Panther Theme" returns in an opening credits sequence animated by Richard Williams, where the Panther and Clouseau parody classic films. Mancini cleverly interpolates snippets from "The Sound of Music", "Singin' in the Rain", and even the 1960s "Batman Theme" into his melody.

The introduction of "The Inspector Clouseau Theme" marked a significant development in Mancini's comedy scoring philosophy. As the composer explained, he sought to create "something that is warm and humorous, but that doesn't say, 'Here I am, look at me, I'm funny'". The resulting theme features a slow 4/4 tempo with tuba and trombone alternating with marimba notes, creating what reviewer Paul Tonks described as "a ridiculous tiptoe feeling" perfectly synchronized with Clouseau's physical comedy. This theme appears throughout the score, most notably during an extended sequence where Clouseau attempts to cross a castle moat using increasingly absurd methods.

For the film's romantic elements, Mancini composed "Come to Me", an Oscar-nominated ballad with lyrics by Don Black. Performed by Tom Jones in the film (including a special cameo by Peter Sellers as Clouseau), the song represents Mancini's ability to write sincere love themes amidst the comedy. The soundtrack also features "Until You Love Me", a campy cabaret number performed in the film by drag entertainer Ainsley Jarvis. Notably, the vocals were provided by an uncredited Julie Andrews, using a deep alto register quite different from her usual soprano. Julie Andrews' involvement connects to the film's production team, as she was married to director Blake Edwards. The name Ainsley Jarvis contains the reversed initials of the actress and singer's name.

The score's dramatic highlights include "The Evil Theme", which Film Music on the Web's reviewer praised as "an almost subterranean crime reverberation" featuring Dick Abel's guitar work. This track accompanies Clouseau's sneaking sequences with perfect comic timing. Other cues include "The Great Quasimodo Disguise", where Mancini's escalating "herring" melody mirrors Clouseau's ridiculous costume attempts, and "Blue Feet Picker", which matches the onscreen slapstick with contrapuntal musical chaos.

== Release ==
The original soundtrack was issued by United Artists Records in 1976 on vinyl. Due to the limited nature of the original release, several musical cues composed for the film were either edited or omitted entirely. Fans and collectors of Mancini's work noted the absence of some material that appeared in the film, especially shorter transitional pieces and alternate versions of recurring themes. The album remained out of print for many years, and its availability was restricted to secondary markets.

Rykodisc reissued The Pink Panther Strikes Again in 1998 (#RCD 10739), in a deluxe edition with six bonus tracks including an alternate instrumental of "Until You Love Me" and the film's end credits sequence. In 2014, Quartet Records issued an expanded and remastered edition of The Pink Panther Strikes Again that includes cues that had not been previously released, as well as alternate takes and extended versions of several tracks. The label remixed the entire score from the 16-track masters recorded at C.T.S. Studios in London by John Richards, making this new version in full stereo. The reissue was accompanied by a 24-page full-color booklet, with extensive liner notes by Daniel Schweiger.

== Critical reception ==
Professional ratings
Review scores
Source	Rating
AllMusic	3/5 stars
Film Music on the Web	5/5 stars

AllMusic's review highlighted Mancini's "light, playful touch" throughout the album, particularly praising how the composer's music remained "buoyant and characteristically suggestive" even when supporting the film's most outrageous comedy sequences. The review also noted the value of the Rykodisc reissue, which restored nearly ten minutes of previously unreleased music along with extensive liner notes and the film's trailer.

Film Music on the Web's Paul Tonks declaring it "one of the most successful comedy scores from Mancini". His detailed review particularly praised the "exquisite" Clouseau theme and its perfect synchronization with the actor's physical comedy. Tonks also highlighted Mancini's creative instrumentation choices, noting how "marimba, keyboard, and glockenspiel" created the theme's distinctive sound. While generally enthusiastic, the review did note one production flaw - a noticeable edit in "His Doomsday Machine" at approximately 2:44 that briefly disrupts the musical flow.

== Accolades ==
At the 49th Academy Awards, held on March 28, 1977, the song "Come to Me" from The Pink Panther Strikes Again received a nomination in the category of Best Music (Original Song). The music was composed by Henry Mancini, with lyrics by Don Black. The song competed alongside "Evergreen (Love Theme from A Star Is Born)" by Barbra Streisand and Paul Williams, which ultimately won the award, as well as "Ave Satani" from The Omen by Jerry Goldsmith, "Gonna Fly Now" from Rocky by Bill Conti, Carol Connors, and Ayn Robbins, and "A World That Never Was" from Half a House by Sammy Fain and Paul Francis Webster.

Awards and nominations for The Pink Panther Strikes Again
Year	Award	Category	Result	Ref.
1977	49th Academy Awards	Best Music (Original Song)	Nominated	

== Track listing ==
No.	Title	Writer(s)	Performer(s)	Length
1.	"Main Title From The Pink Panther Strikes Again" (The Pink Panther Theme / Funeral March of a Marionette / Batman / The Sound of Music / Singin' in the Rain / Big Spender)			2:36
2.	"The Inspector Clouseau Theme"			3:10
3.	"The Great Quasimodo Disguise"			3:35
4.	"Bier Fest Polka"			2:43
5.	"Come To Me (Instrumental)"			2:55
6.	"Until You Love Me"	Don Black	Ainsley Jarvis	2:38
7.	"Come To Me"	Don Black	Tom Jones, Jacques Clouseau (cameo)	4:35
8.	"Along Came Omar"			2:20
9.	"Until You Love Me (Instrumental)"			3:17
10.	"The Inspector Clouseau Theme (Reprise)"			3:08
11.	"The Evil Theme"			2:59
12.	"Exodus From The Castle"			3:05

== Personnel ==
Credits adapted from the liner notes of The Pink Panther Strikes Again.

- Composed By, Conductor – Henry Mancini
- Mixed By (Remixing), Engineer – Mickey Crofford
- Producer – Joe Reisman
- Recorded By, Engineer – John Richards
- Concertmaster – Sidney Sax
- Bassoon, Soloist – Howard Etherton
- Guitar, Soloist – Dick Abell
- Keyboards, Soloist – Steve Gray
- Tenor Saxophone, Soloist – Tony Coe
- Trombone, Soloist – Don Lusher
- Tuba, Soloist – Stephen Wick
- Vibraphone, Soloist – Eric Allen
- Violin, Soloist – Johnny Van Derrick
