= An Evening with Julie Andrews =

Live album by Julie Andrews
- Released: 1977
- Genre: Pop, show tune
- Label: RCA Victor

Julie Andrews chronology
The Pink Panther Strikes Again (1976)	An Evening with Julie Andrews (1977)	10 (1979)

An Evening with Julie Andrews is a live album by Julie Andrews recorded during the English star's 1977 concert at Osaka Festival Hall in Japan. The performance came at a transitional moment in Andrews' career—after her peak Hollywood years but before her later resurgence on stage. The album captures her signature blend of Broadway and film classics, though its reception and legacy remain somewhat niche.

Andrews initially hesitated to tour Japan, as revealed in a 1977 interview, but ultimately accepted a $1 million offer on the condition that her family could join her. The concerts, held in four cities, were part of a brief return to live performance after she had scaled back work in the 1970s. Originally announced in Billboard as Julie Andrews On Tour, the record would include performances in Japan, Hong Kong, Australia and New Zealand, but RCA Records released only the Japanese performance with its present title. The phrase "An Evening with Julie Andrews" had previously appeared as part of the title of an unrelated NBC television special broadcast on 9 November 1969, An Evening with Julie Andrews and Harry Belafonte.

The music critic from The Age wrote that the track listing leans heavily on nostalgia, featuring staples like "Do-Re-Mi", "I Could Have Danced All Night", and "Supercalifragilisticexpialidocious", alongside Stephen Sondheim's "Being Alive" and Peter Allen's "Everything Old Is New Again". The critic noted the crowd's enthusiasm but also highlighted the album's safe, familiar approach, describing it as "musical memories of her past" rather than a reinvention.

RCA Records never released the album in the United States due to a decline in Ms. Andrew's popularity there. However, copies of the album were being sold in the US for as much as $1,000 by 1994. RCA never issued the album on compact disc anywhere in the world.

== Track listing ==
Side 1
No.	Title	Writer(s)	Length
1.	"Overture"
2.	"I'll Play for You"	Jim Seals, Dash Crofts
3.	"I'm Old Fashioned"	Jerome Kern, Johnny Mercer
4.	"Wouldn't It Be Loverly"	Alan Jay Lerner, Frederick Loewe
5.	"This Is My Beloved"	Wright, Forest
6.	"Being Alive"	Stephen Sondheim
7.	"Medley: a) Everything Old Is New Again / b) My Melancholy Baby / c) Bye Bye Blues / d) Everybody Loves My Baby / e) Thoroughly Modern Millie"	Peter Allen, B. Sager / George Norton, Ernie Burnett, Maybelle Watson / Fred Hamm, Dave Bennett, Bert Lown, Chauncey Gray / Palmer, Spencer Williams / Sammy Cahn, Jimmy Van Heusen

Side 2
No.	Title	Writer(s)	Length
1.	"Whistling Away the Dark"	Henry Mancini, Johnny Mercer
2.	"Medley: a) My Favorite Things / b) Do-Re-Mi / c) Supercalifragilisticexpialidocious"	Richard Rodgers, Oscar Hammerstein II / R. Rodgers, O. Hammerstein II / Richard M. Sherman, Robert B. Sherman
3.	"Medley: a) Camelot / b) Show Me / c) I Could Have Danced All Night"	Alan Jay Lerner, Frederick Loewe / A. J. Lerner, F. Loewe / A. J. Lerner, F. Loewe
4.	"The Sound of Music"	Richard Rodgers, Oscar Hammerstein II
5.	"I'd Rather Leave While I'm in Love"	Peter Allen, B. Sager

== Personnel ==
Credits adapted from the liner notes of An Evening with Julie Andrews record.

- Recorded Live at Osaka Festival Hall
- Date: September 21, 1977
- Producer: Tony Adams
- Co-Producer: Gerry Kurting
- Music Director: Jack Elliott
- Musicians: Jack Elliott (piano), Bob Badgley (bass), Douglas Dean (drums), Marion Children (trumpet), Joseph Capet (sax), Deb Dennis (violin), Nobuo Hara with Kit Shami & Fiat, Swing Fantastic Orchestra
- Stage: Michael Kidd
- American Sound Engineers: Kevin Tyrrell, Geoff Edwards
- Recording Director: Molgo Romero
- Recording and Remixing Engineer: Egt LUvinuma
- Assistant Engineers: Magas'Ohno, Tomotzu Yosinda
- Photographer: Masoni Hotta
- Designer: Takashi Murak
