= Edward M. Favor =

American vaudeville performer (1856–1936)

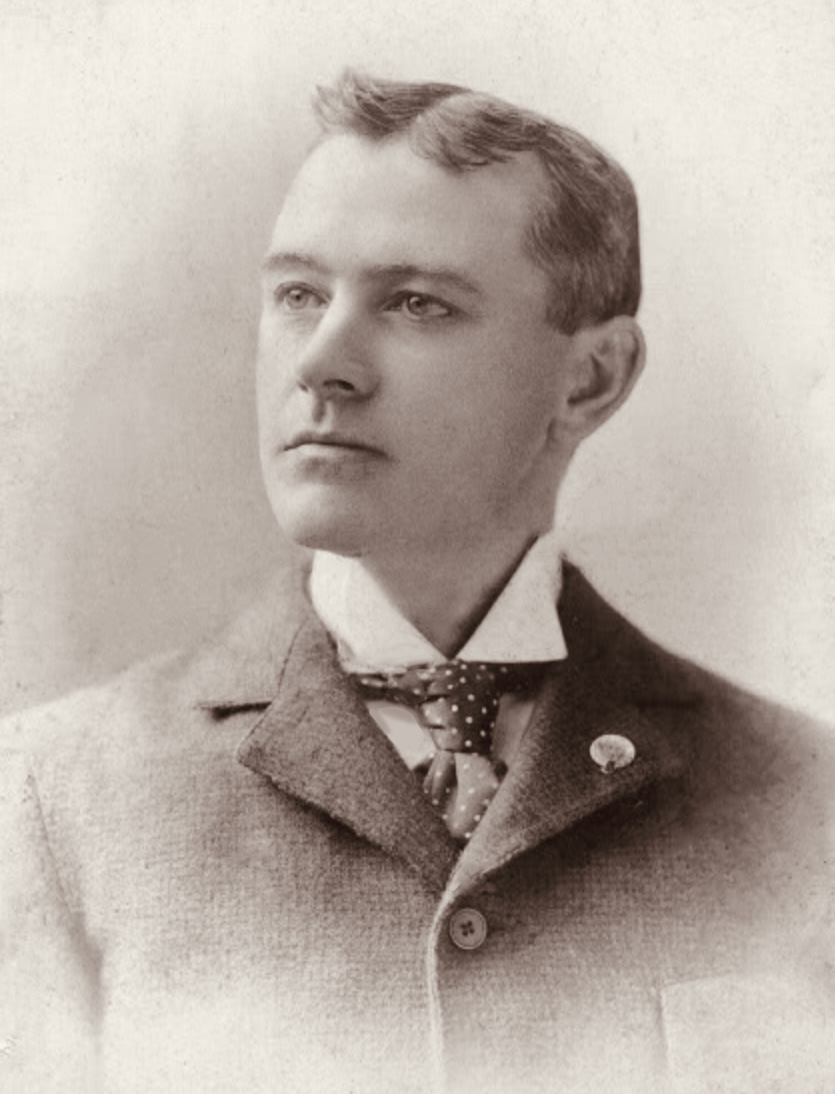
- Edward M. Favor, c. 1900

Background information
- Born: August 29, 1856; New York City, New York, U.S.
- Died: January 10, 1936 (aged 79) Brooklyn, New York City, U.S.
- Occupations: comedian; singer; musical theatre performer

Edward Addison Favor (August 29, 1856 – January 10, 1936), who was billed as Edward M. Favor or Ed. M. Favor, was an American vaudeville comedian, singer and musical theatre performer who was one of the most popular stars of the late nineteenth and early twentieth centuries.

== Biography ==
He was born in New York City, the son of Franklin Cushman Favor and his wife Lydia, née Lowe. Suggestions that the family name was originally LeFevre have been proved to be incorrect, as the family bible states his last name as Favor.

He began working in vaudeville as a light comedian in about 1876, and in or before 1877 married Edith Sinclair (1857-1942), who had been a child actress. Billed as Favor and Sinclair, the couple worked together as a duo and in musical comedies. In 1887 they appeared together as members of the Edith Sinclair Comedy Company in A Box of Cash, in which he played an Irish-American character. Despite the popularity of his Irish character roles, there is no evidence that he had any Irish ancestry. In 1893 he and his wife appeared on Broadway in Edward E. Rice's long-running burlesque 1492 Up to Date.

He made one of his first recordings in 1893, of "The Commodore Song", taken from his previous show, Ship Ahoy. Among his other early successes were "Say Au Revoir, But Not Goodbye" (North American, 1894), "Daisy Bell (Bicycle Built for Two)" (Edison, 1894), and "My Best Girl's a New Yorker" (Columbia, 1895). By the late 1890s, Favor had recorded for most of the major recording companies, in between his vaudeville commitments. In 1899, he was one of the first to record on the Zonophone label, and in 1900 recorded for the first time for Eldridge R. Johnson's "Improved" record label, later to become Victor Records the next year. He continued to appear on stage and, in 1900, was described in Broadway magazine as "one of the best light comedians on the stage" and, with his wife, as "one of the big attractions in vaudeville."

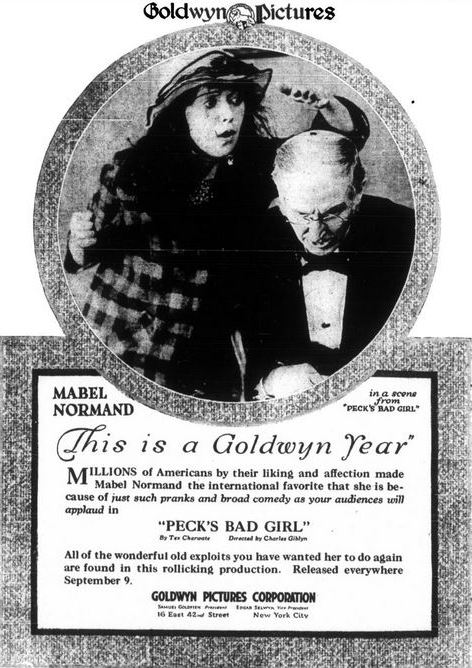
Ad for Peck's Bad Girl (1918) with Mabel Normand and Edward M. Favor

He continued to make recordings for the next decade, sung in his "Irish-American piping tenor". These included comic numbers for Edison, Columbia and other companies, such as "Hamlet Was A Melancholy Dane", "Who Threw the Overalls in Mrs. Murphy's Chowder?" (1901), "On a Sunday Afternoon" (1902), "Bedelia (The Irish Coon Song Serenade)" (1903), "I Think I Hear a Woodpecker Knocking at My Family Tree", and "Pocahontas" (1906). He also made recordings with his wife, Steve Porter, and the American Quartet.

He and his wife toured in South Africa and Australia in 1906. He appeared in shows thereafter; the Boston Globe stated that "While [Favor and Sinclair] were rehearsing with The Blue Moon in New York City they were appearing in one of the vaudeville houses in a sketch called 'The Maguires', which they have played at least 10,000 times." However, his career as a recording artist was in decline by 1908. He made his final recordings for Victor in 1911, and for Edison in 1914 when he recorded "On the 7:28" and "Indoor Sports".

Favor appeared in theatrical shows through the 1920s and into the early 1930s. In 1933, he appeared in the Broadway productions of John Ferguson and Merton of the Movies, and in 1934 in America - Very Early.

He died at the age of 79 in Brooklyn in 1936, of peritonitis.

Daisy Bell sung by Edward M. Favor
1894 Edison Phonograph Company brown wax cylinder recording of "Daisy Bell", composed by Harry Dacre.

How can they tell that I'm Irish?
1910 Edison Records recording of part of Edward M. Favor's vaudeville act. Song composed by Clarence Wainwright Murphy.
