= Julie and Carol at Carnegie Hall (original cast recording) =

Studio album by Julie Andrews, Carol Burnett
- Released: 1962
- Recorded: June 1962
- Genre: Show tune, folk
- Label: Columbia Masterworks

Julie Andrews chronology
Don't Go in the Lion's Cage Tonight (1962)	Julie and Carol at Carnegie Hall (1962)	Mary Poppins (1964)

Julie and Carol at Carnegie Hall is a live cast album documenting the pre-taping performance of Julie Andrews and Carol Burnett's 1962 CBS television special. The album features a combination of musical numbers, comedy sketches, and medleys, including the "History of Musical Comedy", along with Broadway songs, folk tunes, and original duets performed before a live audience. The production involved director Joe Hamilton, writer Mike Nichols, and musical director Irwin Kostal.

The album charted on U.S. music rankings, spending nine weeks on Billboard’s Best-Selling Monaural LPs chart and reaching number 85, while also appearing on Cash Box's Stereo LPs chart at number 26. Columbia Records issued promotional singles to radio stations featuring selections from the album. Over the years, the recording has been reissued in various formats, including a remastered double-CD edition in 2012 that combined the Carnegie Hall performance with another television special, preserving the original recordings for modern audiences.

== Overview ==
The album is a live recording documenting the pre-taping performance of Julie Andrews and Carol Burnett's 1962 CBS television special. Recorded with an audience prior to the actual broadcast, it preserves the same material as the televised version, though with minor performance variations. Released in 1962 by Columbia Records, it captures the duo's musical and comedic routines, including their signature "History of Musical Comedy" medley.

The production team included director Joe Hamilton (Burnett's future husband), writer Mike Nichols, and musical director Irwin Kostal, known for his work on West Side Story and Mary Poppins. The album features a mix of Broadway showtunes, folk songs, and original comedy sketches. Highlights include Frank Loesser's "Big D" from The Most Happy Fella, the English folk song "Oh Dear, What Can the Matter Be", and their extended "History of Musical Comedy" medley tracing Broadway hits from 1910 to 1957. A notable segment is "From Switzerland: The Pratt Family," a parody of the von Trapp family singers.

Columbia Records issued the tracks "Meantime" (Side A, vocals by Carol Burnett) and "You're So London" (Side B, vocals by Carol Burnett and Julie Andrews) together as a promotional 7-inch vinyl single, identified by the catalog number JZSP 57713. The release was intended primarily for radio stations and music industry professionals rather than for commercial sale.

While the original album was briefly issued on CD in 1989, a remastered double-CD edition was released in 2012, combining both performances for the first time. The 2012 reissue, titled The CBS Television Specials: Live at Carnegie Hall/Live at Lincoln Center, marked the CD debut of the Lincoln Center concert and restored the original recordings. This compilation preserved the duo's legacy, offering a comprehensive look at their collaborative work.

== Critical reception ==
Professional ratings
Review scores
Source	Rating
AllMusic	4.5/5 stars

Music Vendor praised the duo's "sparkling songs, dances and satire",calling the album a "captivating wax reprisal of that memorable hour". Similarly, Cash Box described it as a "double-barreled treat" and a "quality package" sure to please a wide range of record buyers. Billboard described it as a "warm and delightful listening experience" and "a credit to everyone associated with the show", highlighting the dramatic tracks Burnett's "Meantime" and Andrews' "I Have a Love".

Melody Maker reviewer considered the album "corny, but often clever", while Peter Aldersley from Pop Weekly magazine wrote: "There is lots of comedy and much melody throughout-both extremely well done".AllMusic rated the album four and a half out of five stars but did not include a written review for it.

== Commercial performance ==
The album managed to chart on US music charts. On September 1, 1962, it debuted at number 126 on the 150 Best-Selling Monaural LPs chart In total, it spent nine weeks on the chart. and peaked at number 85 on 6 October 1962. On Cash Box magazine's music chart, it reached number 26 on the Stereo LPs chart.

== Track listing ==
No.	Title	Writer(s)	Performer(s)	Length
1.	"No Mozart Tonight"	Ken Welch, Mike Nichols	Carol Burnett	1:38
2.	"You're So London"	K. Welch, M. Nichols	Carol Burnett, Julie Andrews	3:58
3.	"Oh Dear What Can The Matter Be"	Traditional	Julie Andrews	4:14
4.	"From Russia: The Nausiev Ballet — "There's No Business Like Show Business", "The Girl That I Marry", "Doin' What Comes Natur'lly""	Irving Berlin	Julie Andrews, Carol Burnett	9:12
5.	"Meantime"	Al Stillman, Robert Allen	Carol Burnett	4:34
6.	"From Switzerland: The Pratt Family — "Pratt Family Tree", "The Things We Like Best", "Ding Dong Yum Yum Yum""	K. Welch, M. Nichols	Carol Burnett, Julie Andrews	8:00
7.	"History Of Musical Comedy: "Every Little Movement" / "Ah! Sweet Mystery of Life" / "Tramp, Tramp, Tramp" / "Look for the Silver Lining" / "Limehouse Blues" / "Funny Face" / "Fidgety Feet" / "'S Wonderful" / "Hallelujah!" / "Why Was I Born?" / "Don't Ever Leave Me" / "Dancing in the Dark" / "I Get a Kick Out of You" / "Night and Day" / "Where or When" / "Lucky Day" / "Yesterdays" / "Get Out of Town" / "Glad to Be Unhappy" / "I've Got You Under My Skin" / "Begin the Beguine" / "I Cain't Say No" / "Wouldn't It Be Loverly" / "A Boy Like That" / "I Have a Love""	Karl Hoschna, Otto Harbach / Victor Herbert, Rida Johnson Young / V. Herbert, R. J. Young / Jerome Kern, Buddy DeSylva / Douglas Furber, Philip Braham / George Gershwin, Ira Gershwin / G. Gershwin, I. Gershwin / G. Gershwin, I. Gershwin / Vincent Youmans, Clifford Grey, Leo Robin / Jerome Kern, Oscar Hammerstein II / J. Kern, O. Hammerstein II / Arthur Schwartz, Howard Dietz / Cole Porter / C. Porter / Richard Rodgers, Lorenz Hart / B. DeSylva, L. Brown, R. Henderson / J. Kern, Otto Harbach / C. Porter / R. Rodgers, L. Hart / C. Porter / C. Porter / R. Rodgers, O. Hammerstein II / Alan Jay Lerner, Frederick Loewe / Leonard Bernstein, Stephen Sondheim / L. Bernstein, S. Sondheim	Julie Andrews, Carol Burnett	9:52
8.	"From Texas: Big D"	F. Loesser	Carol Burnett, Julie Andrews	5:39

== Personnel ==
Credits adapted from the liner notes of Julie and Carol at Carnegie Hall record.

- Executive-produced by Bob Banner
- Produced by Jim Foglesong
- Produced and directed by Joe Hamilton
- Music directed by Irwin Kostal
- Choral music directed by George Becker
- Associate produced and choreographed by Ernest Flatt

== Charts ==
Weekly chart performance for Julie and Carol at Carnegie Hall
Chart (1962)	Peak position
US 150 Best-Selling Monaural LPs (Billboard)	85
US (Cash Box Best Selling Albums - Stereo)	26
