= The Secret of Christmas (Julie Andrews album) =

Studio album by Julie Andrews
- Released: 1975
- Genre: Christmas
- Label: Embassy; Columbia (U.S.)

Julie Andrews chronology
| The Best of Julie Andrews (1972) | The Secret of Christmas (1975) | The Pink Panther Strikes Again (1976) |

The Secret of Christmas is the second Christmas album by English singer actress Julie Andrews. After an eight-year hiatus from solo albums, and having previously worked with various record labels, Andrews released this collection on budget record label Embassy Records in 1975. Originally consisting of twelve holiday carols, it received rave reviews in England for the exquisite arrangements tailored to Andrews' vocal performance.

Augmented by two additional tracks, the album was released in the U.S. as Christmas with Julie Andrews in 1982, and the expanded collection was reissued in the U.K. as The Julie Andrews Christmas Album in 1984.

== Background and releases ==
Embassy Records was known for producing affordable cover versions of popular songs, sold exclusively at Woolworths variety stores. Initially active from 1954 to 1965, it ceased operations when its parent company, Oriole, was acquired by CBS Records. The label was revived by CBS between 1973 and 1980 to release budget-friendly versions of albums by Columbia Records artists in the UK and Europe.

Building on this partnership, CBS decided to release Julie Andrews' album in the United States in 1982, seven years after its original UK launch. This new edition, retitled Christmas with Julie Andrews, featured new cover art and included two additional tracks. The first was "The Secret of Christmas", which originally appeared on Christmas Greetings: Volume 4, an album produced by Columbia for A&P supermarkets in 1973. The second was her recording of "Silent Night" from The Great Songs of Christmas: Album Three, which Columbia produced for Goodyear Tire in 1963.

In 1984, Reader's Digest, a division of The Reader's Digest Association, Inc., publisher of Reader's Digest magazine, released a new edition of the album, now titled The Julie Andrews Christmas Album, with the songs in the track listing in a different order.

== Critical reception ==
Professional ratings
Review scores
| Source | Rating |
|---|---|
| AllMusic | 4/5 stars |
| Records.Christmas | 9/10 stars |

Robert Lovering of AllMusic observed that thealbum occasionally suffers from "overly considered and clean arrangements", but praised Andrews's "graceful vocals" and the album's "excellent selection of material". Johan Palme, in his review for Records.Christmas website described Julie Andrews' The Secret of Christmas as a masterclass in "overproduction" done right, describing Ian Fraser's arrangements as "an amazing artifice" filled with "harps, choirs, strings, glockenspiels", while praising Andrews as “"the perfect serene vocal beacon in the middle".

Bill Ervolino of The Record praised Christmas With Julie Andrews as "a winner" album, highlighting Andrews' "lovely, lucid voice" on classics like "It Came Upon a Midnight Clear" and "Away in a Manger". Similarly, Richard Harrington of The Washington Post commended the album for its "clear, clean vocals" and "nuanced readings", particularly on lesser-known tracks such as "In the Bleak Midwinter" and "The Holy Boy". However, Kris Teo of the Sunday Mail offered a more tempered view, noting that while Andrews "can hit the high notes" on traditional carols like "O Little Town of Bethlehem", the album's "by-the-numbers arrangements" limit its appeal, confining it to a quiet, after-dinner ambiance.

The album was featured in a list of Christmas albums by USA Today, with Edna Gundersen writing that it "finds the silver-throated singer in orchestral arrangements of both holiday chestnuts and such less familiar fare". Regarding The Julie Andrews Christmas Album, critic Steve Metcalf, writing for the Hartford Courant, praised the album, noting that every track stands out and describing it as "a work that always knocks me out".

== Track listing ==
Christmas with Julie Andrews
| No. | Title | Writer(s) | Length |
|---|---|---|---|
| 1. | "Oh Come All Ye Faithful" | Frederick Oakeley / John Reading / John Francis Wade | 2:22 |
| 2. | "In the Bleak Midwinter" | Ian Fraser / Traditional | 3:51 |
| 3. | "The Holy Boy" | Traditional | 3:28 |
| 4. | "It Came Upon a Midnight Clear" | Edmund Sears / Richard Storrs Willis | 3:37 |
| 5. | "See Amid the Winter's Snow" | Traditional | 3:57 |
| 6. | "O Little Town of Bethlehem" | Phillips Brooks / Lewis Redner | 3:07 |
| 7. | "What Child Is This?" | William Chatterton Dix / Traditional | 3:32 |
| 8. | "Hark! The Herald Angels Sing" | Felix Mendelssohn / Charles Wesley | 3:32 |
| 9. | "Rocking" | Traditional | 2:22 |
| 10. | "Away in a Manger" | James R. Murray / Traditional | 3:55 |
| 11. | "I Wonder as I Wander" | John Jacob Niles / Traditional | 3:58 |
| 12. | "Patapan" | Bernard de la Monnoye / Traditional | 2:50 |
| 13. | "The Secret of Christmas" | Sammy Cahn / James Van Heusen | 3:21 |
| 14. | "Silent Night, Holy Night" | Franz Gruber / Joseph Mohr | 2:23 |

== Personnel ==
Credits adapted from the liner notes of The Secret Of Christmas record.

- All titles arranged and conducted by Ian Fraser.
