= Camelot (Broadway cast recording) =

Cast recording by Various artists
- Released: 1960
- Genre: Show tune
- Label: Columbia Masterworks

Julie Andrews chronology
My Fair Lady (1959)	Camelot (1960)	Broadway's Fair Julie (1961)

Camelot is the original cast recording of the musical with the same name, released in 1960 by Columbia Records. With a book and lyrics by Alan Jay Lerner and music by Frederick Loewe, the musical is based on T.H. White's novel The Once and Future King, which reinterprets the Arthurian legend. The original Broadway production starred Richard Burton as King Arthur, Julie Andrews as Guenevere, and Robert Goulet as Lancelot. The album includes some of the show’s most celebrated songs, such as "Camelot", "How to Handle a Woman", and "If Ever I Would Leave You", which have since become standards in the musical theater repertoire.

Produced by Goddard Lieberson, who had previously supervised Lerner and Loewe's successful recordings for My Fair Lady and Gigi, the album was issued in both stereo and monaural formats. Columbia Records employed an innovative marketing campaign that included the use of collectible "Camelot tokens" redeemable for the album, generating significant anticipation before its release. The label invested approximately $400,000 in the project.

Upon its release, the album received strong critical acclaim for its performances and musical quality. Publications such as Billboard, Cash Box, and Variety praised the cast's vocal delivery and the lush orchestral arrangements, describing it as a distinguished addition to the Broadway canon. The album achieved major commercial success, reaching number one on both the Billboard and Cash Box album charts in 1961, where it remained for several weeks, and selling over one million copies by 1965. It was later certified Gold by the Recording Industry Association of America (RIAA). Camelot also received a nomination for Best Musical Show Album at the 3rd Annual Grammy Awards and was inducted into the Grammy Hall of Fame. Its cultural impact was sealed when it became associated with the idealism of President John F. Kennedy's administration.

== Background and recording ==
The musical, with a book by Alan Jay Lerner and music by Frederick Loewe, is based on the Arthurian legend as depicted in T.H. White's novel The Once and Future King. The original Broadway production starred Richard Burton as King Arthur, Julie Andrews as Guenevere, and Robert Goulet as Lancelot. The album features iconic songs such as "Camelot," "How to Handle a Woman," and "If Ever I Would Leave You," which have become staples in the musical theater repertoire.

The recording was produced by Goddard Lieberman, who was also responsible for other successful Lerner and Loewe productions like My Fair Lady and Gigi. The album was released in both stereo and monaural formats, with Columbia Records implementing innovative marketing strategies, such as issuing "Camelot tokens" that could be redeemed for the album. This pre-release promotion helped generate significant interest and sales even before the album hit the market. Columbia with CBS was backed entirely by record company money, they put up $400,000 for the "Camelot" album.

== Release ==
The album's release coincided with the Broadway production's run, which began in December 1960 at the Majestic Theatre in New York. Despite mixed initial reviews for the stage production, the cast recording was well-received and contributed to the musical's enduring popularity.

In 1998, Columbia/Legacy released a digitally remastered version of the album in compact disc (CD), which included extensive liner notes, original playbill reproductions, reviews, photos, and an essay by Marc Kirkeby. This reissue aimed to preserve the historical significance of the recording while introducing it to a new generation of listeners. The 1998 CD reissue was commended for its additional content and remastered sound quality.

== Critical reception ==
Professional ratings
Review scores
Source	Rating
AllMusic	4.5/5 stars

Cash Box described the album as a "top sales bonanza", emphasizing the charming collection of songs and the delightful performances by the cast. While the review wrote that the songs might not have the immediate show-stopping quality of Lerner and Loewe's previous work, My Fair Lady, it still celebrated the addition of lovely ballads to their catalog.

Billboard highlighted the "brilliant" performances of Julie Andrews and Richard Burton, as well as Robert Goulet's fine vocal style. The review also praised the album's packaging, which included colorful photos of the cast and notes on the leading players, making it an attractive purchase for fans of the musical. Variety referred to it as "a delightful work with plenty of rewarding moments".

LIFE magazine described Camelot as a "lovely spell" cast and praised the musical's blend of old English legends and enchanting new melodies, brought to life by the performers.

William Ruhlmann of AllMusic praised the album as a "Broadway landmark", highlighting the performances of Richard Burton, Julie Andrews, and Robert Goulet. He wrote that the music, composed by Lerner and Loewe, was both delightful and significant in the context of Broadway history.

== Awards and nominations ==
The album received a nomination for Best Musical Show in the 3rd Annual Grammy Awards and was inducted into the Grammy Hall of Fame in 2006.

Awards and nominations for Camelot
Year	Award	Category	Result	Ref.
1961	3rd Annual Grammy Awards	Best Musical Show	Nominated	

== Commercial performance ==
The album reached No. 1 on the Billboard Top LP's - 150 Best-Selling Monaural LP's chart on June 5, 1961, and stayed at the top for six weeks. it also reached No. 1 on The Cash Box Best Selling Monaural & Stereo Albums chart on July 1, 1961, and stayed at the top for five weeks. By May 1965, it had sold 1,236,000 copies in the United States alone. It was later certified Gold by the Recording Industry Association of America (RIAA) for its performance in the country.

The album's success was further bolstered by its association with President John F. Kennedy, who was fond of the musical and its themes, often referencing the "Camelot" concept as a metaphor for his administration. In an interview with historian Theodore White, published in LIFE magazine, on November 29, 1963, Jacqueline Kennedy likened the Kennedy era to the myth of Camelot, referencing a song from the album that JFK loved. She quoted the lyrics, "Don't let it be forgot, that once there was a spot, for one brief shining moment that was known as Camelot", and expressed that while there would be other great presidents, there would never be another Camelot.

== Track listing ==
No.	Title	Writer(s)	Performer(s)	Length
1.	"Overture"	Lerner and Loewe	Orchestra*	3:13
2.	"I Wonder What The King Is Doing Tonight"	Lerner and Loewe	Richard Burton	1:28
3.	"The Simple Joys Of Maidenhood"	Lerner and Loewe	Julie Andrews	2:02
4.	"Camelot"	Lerner and Loewe	Richard Burton	2:30
5.	"Follow Me"	Lerner and Loewe	Mary Sue Berry	3:02
6.	"The Lusty Month Of May"	Lerner and Loewe	Julie Andrews, Ensemble	2:12
7.	"C'Est Moi"	Lerner and Loewe	Robert Goulet	3:29
8.	"The Lusty Month Of May"	Lerner and Loewe	Julie Andrews, Ensemble	3:00
9.	"Then You May Take Me To The Fair"	Lerner and Loewe	Julie Andrews, Bruce Yarnell, James Gannon, John Cullum	4:29
10.	"How to Handle a Woman"	Lerner and Loewe	Richard Burton	2:37
11.	"Before I Gaze At You Again"	Lerner and Loewe	Julie Andrews	1:59
12.	"If Ever I Would Leave You"	Lerner and Loewe	Robert Goulet	3:11
13.	"The Seven Deadly Virtues"	Lerner and Loewe	Roddy McDowall	1:26
14.	"What Do The Simple Folk Do?"	Lerner and Loewe	Richard Burton, Julie Andrews	5:01
15.	"Fie On Goodness!"	Lerner and Loewe	Knights	3:35
16.	"I Loved You Once In Silence"	Lerner and Loewe	Julie Andrews	3:07
17.	"Guenevere"	Lerner and Loewe	Ensemble	3:19
18.	"Finale Ultimo (Camelot Reprise)"	Lerner and Loewe	Richard Burton	2:04

== Personnel ==
Credits adapted from the liner notes of Camelot: Original Broadway Cast.

- Original Broadway Cast: Richard Burton and Julie Andrews in Camelot
- Book & Lyrics by Alan Jay Lerner
- Music by Frederick Lowe
- Production staged by Moss Hart
- Co-starring Roddy McDowall and Robert Goulet
- Musical Direction: Franz Allers
- Production by Jenny Productions
- Record production by Goddard Lieberson
- Arranged by Trude Rittman
- Photography by Maynard Frank Wolfe, Milton H. Greene

== Charts ==
Weekly chart performance for Camelot
Chart (1960–1968)	Peak position
Norwegian Albums (VG-lista)	20
UK Albums (Official Charts)	10
U.S. Top LP's - 150 Best-Selling Monaural LP's (Billboard)	1
U.S. The Cash Box Best Selling Monaural & Stereo Albums	1

== Certifications and sales ==
Certifications for Camelot original cast recording
Region	Certification	Certified units/sales
United States (RIAA) Sales as of May 1965	Gold	1,236,000
