= Tip-Toes =

- 2001 studio cast recording
- Music: George Gershwin
- Lyrics: Ira Gershwin
- Book: Guy Bolton; Fred Thompson
- Productions: 1925 Broadway; 2007 Sherman Oaks, California

Tip-Toes is a musical with a book by Guy Bolton and Fred Thompson, lyrics by Ira Gershwin, and music by George Gershwin. It centers on a vaudeville act composed of Tip-Toes, her brother and her uncle, who try to pass her off as an aristocrat to snare a millionaire husband. Farcical complications ensue involving Tip-Toes' temporary amnesia and a marital infidelity subplot.

The musical was modestly successful on Broadway in 1925 and in London in 1926. It was quickly adapted as a silent film starring Dorothy Gish and Will Rogers.

== Production history ==
Tip-Toes was produced by Alex A. Aarons and Vinton Freedley, to satirise the Florida land boom, which was then at its peak. They reunited the creative team of Lady, Be Good!, which had been a hit the previous year with Fred and Adele Astaire. The Broadway production opened at the Liberty Theatre on December 28, 1925, and ran for 192 performances. It was directed by John Harwood, and the dance numbers were staged by Sammy Lee and Earl Lindsay. The cast included Queenie Smith as Tip-Toes, Allen Kearns as Steve Burton, Jeanette MacDonald as Sylvia Metcalf, Andrew Tombes as Al, and Harry Watson Jr. as Hen.

A West End production featuring Dorothy Dickson, Laddie Cliff, Allan Kearns, John Kirby, Vera Bryer, Peggy Beaty and Evan Thomas opened at the Winter Garden Theatre on August 31, 1926, and ran for 182 performances.

An Australian production opened at the Victoria Theatre in Newcastle, New South Wales, on May 4, 1927, before a national tour. Also in 1927, the show was made into one of the last silent films, starring Dorothy Gish as Tip-Toes (spelled Tiptoes in the film) and Will Rogers as Hen.

In 1982, original orchestra books for the show were among many documents unearthed in a warehouse in Secaucus, New Jersey, and in 1989 two concerts were presented at the Library of Congress to celebrate the discovery. In 1998, Carnegie Hall decided to present the show as part of its two-year Gershwin Centenary program, and a full restoration of the project was undertaken by reconciling original programs and scripts with the existing musical materials. Of this performance, Stephen Holden of the New York Times said, "the songs and orchestrations have that irresistible fizz that at its perkiest conveys a compressed frenzy of euphoria." In 2001, New World Records released a CD with the scores for both Tip-Toes and Tell Me More, another 1925 musical by the Gershwin brothers, which included the cast from the Carnegie Hall concert.

In 2007, the musical was given its first full staging following its 1998 restoration by the Whitefire Theatre in Sherman Oaks, California. Variety described the production as "an exuberant reminder of the let's-put-on-a-show spirit characterizing the best musical productions of any era."

== Plot summary ==
Act I

There is a land boom in Florida in roaring 1925. At the train station in upscale Palm Beach, flirtatious Rollo Fish Metcalf is surprised to see his socialite wife, Sylvia, planning to give a party for her millionaire brother, Steve, who is coming to visit her. Steve is set to inherit the family glue factory. Rollo agrees to wait for the vaudevillian entertainers, the "Komical Kayes" (Tip-Toes, her brother Al and Uncle Hen), who are arriving to entertain at Steve's bash. It turns out that Rollo once had a flirtation with Tip-Toes Kaye, who was not at all pleased to find out that he is married, and Sylvia has seen an incriminating photo of the pair. When Rollo sees that Tip-Toes is one of the performers, he pays the troupe to leave. The Kayes are so poor that Tip-Toes had to travel in the luggage to avoid paying for a ticket. They stay in Palm Beach to see if they can find a millionaire for Tip-Toes to marry (they are socially ambitious). Tip-Toes runs into Steve at the station, as he helps her avoid the porter who was trying to get her to pay her fare. She thinks he's swell.

Later, people are happily gambling at the Palm Beach Surf Club. Sylvia wants to make Steve appear more sophisticated, so she introduces him to two young ladies, Binnie and Denise, who are to give him lessons at dancing, elocution, music, golf and bridge. Meanwhile, Tip-Toes (pretending to be a wealthy girl, "Roberta Van Renssalaer") plays a game at the club that leads to her being kissed by Steve, who she remembered from the station. The two are immediately and powerfully attracted to each other. Al meets Binnie and Denise, and they all decide to go to the Blues Café. Al and Uncle Hen quarrel after Tip-Toes tells them that she doesn't want to trick Steve now that she really likes him. Tip-Toes is nearly run down by a car. Although she is not seriously injured, she develops amnesia and thinks that she is really Roberta Van Renssalaer. Al and Uncle Hen are happy about this.

Act II

Everyone is getting ready for the party on Steve's yacht the next evening. "Roberta" and Steve are very happy to have found each other. However, since she thinks she is rich, she is spending more money than Al and Uncle Hen have. Rollo discloses Tip-Toes' real identity to Steve, in order to protect his secret, but Steve is despondent. He confronts Tip-Toes, who now remembers who she is, but she tells him that she really loves him and is not after his fortune. Steve reveals that he is bankrupt. He tells her to go after one of the other millionaires at the bash and storms off. Tip-Toes stays aboard the yacht all evening, and when Steve returns, she insists that she loves him and will stay aboard all night "without a chaperone". He is persuaded that she is telling the truth.

Back at the hotel the following day, Tip-Toes pays her family's hotel bill by performing one of her dances for the guests. Steve proposes and gives her an engagement ring. She is delighted, even though she assumes that it is a fake, since Steve has no money. But it turns out to be real, because Steve is really still a millionaire.

== Song list ==
Act I

- Waiting for the Train – Company
- Nice Baby – Sylvia, Rollo, Chorus
- Looking For a Boy – Tip-Toes
- Lady Luck – Guests
- When Do We Dance? – Steve, Binnie, Denise, Guests
- These Charming People – Tip-Toes, Al, Hen
- That Certain Feeling – Tip-Toes, Steve
- Sweet and Low Down – Al, Denise, Binnie, Peggy, Guests
- Finale – Company

Act II

- Our Little Captain – Tip-Toes, Boys
- Looking for a Boy (Reprise) – Tip-Toes, Steve
- It's a Great Little World – Steve, Sylvia, Al, Binnie, Denise, Chorus
- Nighty-Night – Tip-Toes, Steve
- Tip-Toes – Tip-Toes, Chorus
- Finale – Company
