= Oh Dear! What Can the Matter Be? =

Song

"Oh, Dear! What Can the Matter Be?", also known as "Johnny's So Long at the Fair", is a traditional nursery rhyme that can be traced back as far as the 1770s in England. There are several variations on its lyrics. It has Roud Number 1279.

== History ==
The Oxford Dictionary of Nursery Rhymes by Iona and Peter Opie traces this song back to an earlier folk ballad, recorded between 1770 and 1780, whose lyrics are:

O what can the matter be
And what can the matter be
O what can the matter be
Johnny bydes lang at the fair

He'll buy me a twopenny whistle
He'll buy me a threepenny fair
He'll buy me a Bunch o' Blue Ribbons
To tye up my bonny Brown Hair

O saw ye him coming
And saw ye him coming
O saw ye him coming
Hame frae the Newcastle fair

== Tune ==
The tune was first published in British Lyre, or Muses' Repository (1792), and two years later in the James Evan's Ladies Memorandum for 1794. Older versions are likely to have existed, perhaps in 9/8 time rather than the usual 6/8. There are records of it being used as a popular duet by Samuel Harrison and his wife, the soprano Miss Cantelo, from 1776.

== Lyrics ==
The following are given as the traditional lyrics (being chorus and verse) in Cuddon's and Preston's A Dictionary of Literary Terms and Literary Theory:

Oh, dear! What can the matter be?
Dear, dear, what can the matter be?
Oh, dear! What can the matter be?
Johnny's so long at the fair.

He promised he'd buy me a fairing should please me,
And then for a kiss, oh, he vowed he would tease me.
He promised he'd bring me a bunch of blue ribbons
To tie up my bonny brown hair.

Cohen's Folk Music gives a different version of the lyrics:

Oh, dear! What can the matter be?
Oh, dear! What can the matter be?
Oh, dear! What can the matter be?
Johnny's so long at the fair.

He promised he'd bring me a bunch of blue ribbons,
He promised he'd bring me a bunch of blue ribbons,
He promised he'd bring me a bunch of blue ribbons
To tie up my bonny brown hair.

Raph's American Song Treasury uses the traditional lyrics and adds a second verse:

He promised he'd buy me a basket of posies
A garland of lilies, a garland of roses;
A little straw hat to set off the blue ribbons
That tie up my bonny brown hair.

Raph dates this version of the song to 1795, and notes that while it has been popular in the United States for over 200 years, having made its way across the Atlantic shortly after American Independence, it is really English, having achieved widespread popularity in England around 1792, from being performed as a duet at Samuel Harrison concerts. It was performed in concerts in New York and Philadelphia within a decade of arriving in the U.S.

The Oxford Dictionary of Nursery Rhymes dates the song to a manuscript compiled some time between 1770 and 1780. Chappell's Popular Music dates the song to 1792, when it was first published as sheet music. The notes by Stenhouse in the second volume of Johnson's Scots Musical Museum record a concurrent Anglo-Scottish publication.

== Parodies ==
The song has been parodied several times, the best known of which is the American bawdy song "Seven Old Ladies," sung to the same tune but with different lyrics. Here are the chorus and the first two verses, of seven, as published in Ed Cray's The Erotic Muse:

Oh, dear, what can the matter be,
Seven old ladies were locked in the lavatory,
They were there from Monday till Saturday,
And nobody knew they were there.

The first old lady was 'Lizabeth Porter,
She was the deacon of Dorchester's daughter,
Went there to relieve a slight pressure of water,
And nobody knew she was there.

The second old lady was Abigail Splatter.
She went there 'cause something was definitely the matter.
But when she got there, it was only her bladder,
And nobody knew she was there.

One suggested precursor to the bawdy song, recorded in William's Upper Thames collection, is the following "old morris fragment":

Oh, dear, what can the matter be?
Three old women tied to an apple tree!
One ran away, the others stopped till Saturday.
Oh, dear, what can the matter be?

As with many folk songs and tall tales, each verse exaggerates one common trait (one so thin she falls through a knot-hole). Suggested alternate lyrics include:

Oh, dear, what can the matter be,
Six old maids were stuck in the lavatory,
They were there from Sunday till Saturday,
Nobody knew they were there
The first one in was fat lady Humphreys - squeezed herself down and she said "it's quite comfy"
but when she was through she could not get her bum free – and nobody knew she was there.
Refrain
The next one there was old lady Grayson – she couldn't get in so she peed in the basin
it was the same water the next washed her face in – and nobody knew they were there.

"Seven Old Ladies" was not the first parody, however. Long before that parody, the song had been parodied for political purposes. One such parody can be found in the Wisconsin State Journal of 1 March 1864. It was written to exhort parents, who during the U.S. Civil War had not taken much interest in public schooling in Madison, to visit the schools of their children. Its lyrics were:

Oh, dear, what can the matter be?
Oh, dear, what can the matter be?
Oh, dear, what can the matter be?
Parents don't visit the school.

They visit the circus, they visit their neighbors;
They visit their flocks and the servant who labors;
They visit the soldiers with murderours sabers;
Now, why don't they visit the school?

(Chorus)

They care for their horses, they care for their dollars;
They care for their parties and fancy fine collars;
But little, we think, do they care for their scholars;
Because they don't visit the school.

(Chorus)

We know we from hunger and cold are protected;
In virtue and knowledge our minds are directed;
But still we do think that we are sadly neglected;
Because they don't visit the school.

(Chorus)

The Kidsongs Kids also made a version of the song called "Oh Dear, What Should the Color Be?" for their video "Play-Along Songs", about an artist named Pierre not knowing what colors to use for his painting of horses on a carousel.

Barney and Friends also made a version of the song called, "Oh Dear, What Can the Matter Be?" with different version from the episode of What's That Shadow when everyone learns not to be afraid in Season 1.

The Huggabug Club also made a version of the song called "Please, Please Don't Be a Litterbug" for the episode "This Land is Your Land" about picking up trash and protecting our earth.
