= Looking for a Boy =

"Looking For a Boy" is a song composed by George Gershwin, with lyrics by Ira Gershwin.

It was introduced in their 1925 musical Tip-Toes when it was performed by Queenie Smith as Tip-Toes.

== Other recordings ==
- 1958 Connie Stevens - Conchetta
- 1959 Ella Fitzgerald - Ella Fitzgerald Sings the George and Ira Gershwin Song Book (Verve)
- 1960 Rosemary Clooney - Rosie Swings Softly (MGM)
- 1960 June Christy - The Cool School
- 1968 Helen Merrill - A Shade of Difference (Milestone]
