= My Fair Lady (London cast recording) =

Cast recording by the original Broadway cast
- Released: 1959
- Recorded: 1 February 1959
- Genre: Show tunes
- Label: Columbia Records

Julie Andrews chronology
Rose-Marie (1958)	My Fair Lady (1959)	Camelot (1960)

My Fair Lady is the original cast recording of the musical with the same name, released in 1959 by Columbia Records. The album features performances by the original Broadway cast, including Rex Harrison, Julie Andrews, and Stanley Holloway. Composed by Frederick Loewe with lyrics by Alan Jay Lerner, the musical was a major success on Broadway.

Produced by Goddard Lieberson and conducted by Cyril Ornadel, the album was praised praised by the critics. Commercially, it topped Billboard's Best-Selling Stereophonic LPs chart for three weeks in 1959 and later earned multiple certifications, including Gold in the 1960s and 3× Platinum in 1986. It was reissued several times over the decades, notably on CD in 1998 by Columbia Legacy with bonus tracks and archival material.

== Album details ==
The album features the performances of the original Broadway cast, including Rex Harrison, Julie Andrews, and Stanley Holloway. The musical, composed by Frederick Loewe with lyrics by Alan Jay Lerner, was a success on Broadway. The London cast recording, which moved into the Drury Lane Theatre in April 1958, is very similar to the original Broadway recording. The production was conducted by Cyril Ornadel, and the recording was produced by Goddard Lieberson.

The stereo version of the album, recorded in London with the original cast, was released as Columbia OS 2015 and was praised for its high-quality sound and packaging. It was completed in London in February 1959, featuring the original New York cast, and was noted for opening up a new market for the original cast LP.

The recording was later reissued in various formats, including a compact disc (CD) version in 1998 by Columbia Legacy, which included bonus tracks such as "The Embassy Waltz" and extensive liner notes with memorabilia and previously unpublished photos.

== Critical reception ==
Professional ratings
Review scores
Source	Rating
AllMusic	4.5/5 stars

Billboard wrote that the album is "splendid" and it "greatly fulfills all expectations" adding that "worth waiting for". The Dispatch wrote "if you have the original monophonne recording of the Broadway show you will want the stereo counterpart which Laeberson recorded in 1959. Cash Box magazine pointed out that the recording retained all the "original charm and wit" of the musical.Sunday Herald wrote that "Ornadel conducts with conviction and the recording is topnotch" and "a real triumph for its producer".

== Commercial performance ==
The album spent three weeks at number one on the Billboard chart Best-Selling Stereophonic LPs in 1959. Starting May 25, 1959, separate charts were listed for albums in mono and stereo formats, called Best-Selling Monophonic LPs and Best-Selling Stereophonic LPs, respectively. In 1962, the album peaked at number 49 on the Cash Box chart.

It was certified Gold by the Recording Industry Association of America (RIAA) in the 1960s, and later 3× Platinum in November 21, 1986.

== Track listing ==
My Fair Lady (1959)
No.	Title	Writer(s)	Performer(s)	Length
1.	"Overture"	Lerner, Loewe	My Fair Lady Orchestra (1959), Cyril Ornadel, Franz Allers	2:45
2.	"Why Can't the English?"	Lerner, Loewe	Rex Harrison	2:46
3.	"Wouldn't It Be Loverly"	Lerner, Loewe	Julie Andrews	3:57
4.	"With a Little Bit of Luck"	Lerner, Loewe	Stanley Holloway	4:05
5.	"I'm an Ordinary Man"	Lerner, Loewe	Rex Harrison	4:33
6.	"Just You Wait"	Lerner, Loewe	Julie Andrews	2:48
7.	"The Rain in Spain"	Lerner, Loewe	Julie Andrews, Rex Harrison, Robert Coote	2:49
8.	"I Could Have Danced All Night"	Lerner, Loewe	Julie Andrews, Betty Woolfe	3:42
9.	"Ascot Gavotte"	Lerner, Loewe	My Fair Lady Ensemble	3:06
10.	"On the Street Where You Live"	Lerner, Loewe	Leonard Weir	2:54
11.	"You Did It"	Lerner, Loewe	Robert Coote, Rex Harrison, Betty Woolfe	4:04
12.	"Show Me"	Lerner, Loewe	Julie Andrews, Leonard Weir	2:08
13.	"Get Me to the Church on Time"	Lerner, Loewe	Stanley Holloway	2:42
14.	"A Hymn to Him"	Lerner, Loewe	Rex Harrison	3:15
15.	"Without You"	Lerner, Loewe	Julie Andrews	2:05
16.	"I've Grown Accustomed to Her Face"	Lerner, Loewe	Rex Harrison	5:21
17.	"Embassy Waltz (Bonus Track)"	Lerner, Loewe	Percy Faith	2:46

== Personnel ==
Credits adapted from the liner notes of My Fair Lady original cast recording.

- Book and Lyrics by Alan Jay Lerner
- Music by Frederick Loewe
- Musical arrangements by Robert Russell Bennett and Phil Lang
- Musical Director, Cyril Ornadel

Cast

- Julie Andrews
- Rex Harrison
- Stanley Holloway
- Robert Coote
- Betty Woolf
- Leonard Weir

== Charts ==
Weekly chart performance for My Fair Lady: Original Cast
Chart (1959-1962)	Peak position
US Best-Selling Stereophonic LPs (Billboard)	1
US Best Selling Albums (Cashbox)	49

== Certifications and sales ==
Region	Certification	Certified units/sales
Canada	—	250,000
United States (RIAA)	3× Platinum	3,000,000^{^}
^{^} Shipments figures based on certification alone.
