= Who Threw the Overalls in Mrs. Murphy's Chowder =

1898 novelty song written by George L. Geifer

"Who Threw the Overalls in Mrs. Murphy's Chowder?"

Song by Edward M. Favor
- Published: 1898
- Released: 1901
- Songwriter: George L. Geifer

Who Threw the Overalls in Mrs. Murphy's Chowder? is a popular song, sometimes known as "Who Threw the Overalls in Mistress Murphy's Chowder". It was written by George L. Geifer in 1898 and originally recorded by Edward M. Favor in 1901. It was later recorded by Bing Crosby on December 6, 1945 and included in his album St. Patrick's Day. Julie Andrews included the song in her album Don't Go in the Lion's Cage Tonight (1962).

The song describes an incident in which a pair of worn-out overalls are found in a batch of Mrs. Murphy's large pot of chowder. Tim Nolan, who discovered the overalls, immediately assumes it was a prank, and promises to inflict pain on "the mick that threw the overalls ... ". Mistress Murphy, upon realizing the ruckus, admits that she forgot to take the overalls out of the pot after she had been using it for laundry earlier in the day, at which point Nolan apologizes and the group puts music to his words and sing (the chorus).

The song has enjoyed some popularity with Irish-Americans and association with the Saint Patrick's Day holiday and is sometimes played during the holiday. Some versions of the song have been edited to remove elements of the song that can be construed to disparage the Irish. The author Ronald W. Detwiler writes that the song "is considered a classic Irish folk and drinking song due, in large part, to the early recording by Edward M. Favor in 1901 on Edison Records."

The song was used in the 1943 film Coney Island when it was performed by Charles Winninger, Phil Silvers, George Montgomery and Frank Orth and later reprised by Winninger at the piano.
