= I Don't Care (Eva Tanguay song) =

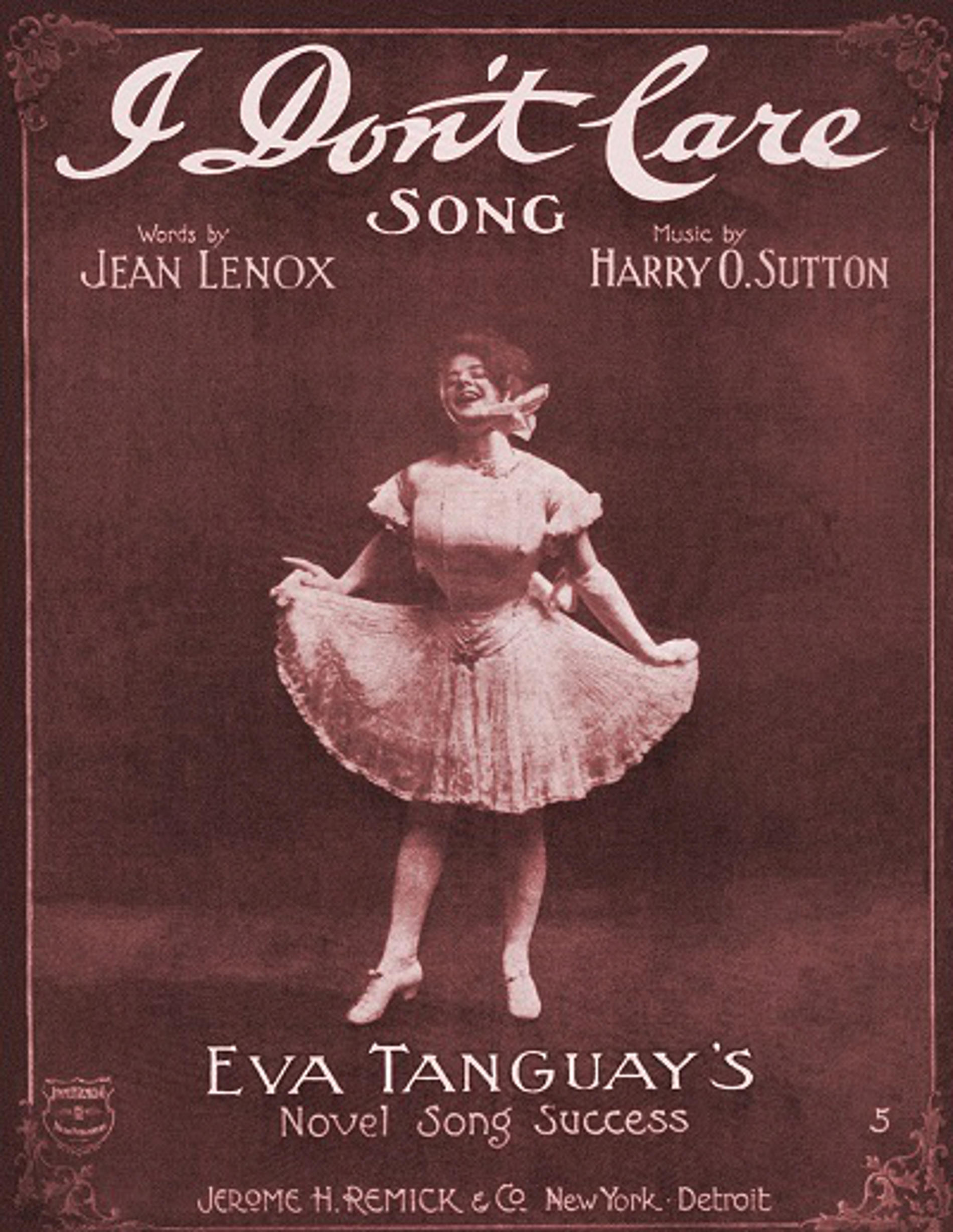

Single by Eva Tanguay
- Released: 1922
- Recorded: 1905
- Genre: Vaudeville
- Label: Nordskog Records
- Songwriters: Jean Lenox (words); Harry O. Sutton (music)
- Producers: Jerome H. Remick & Company

Eva Tanguay sings I Don't Care 1922

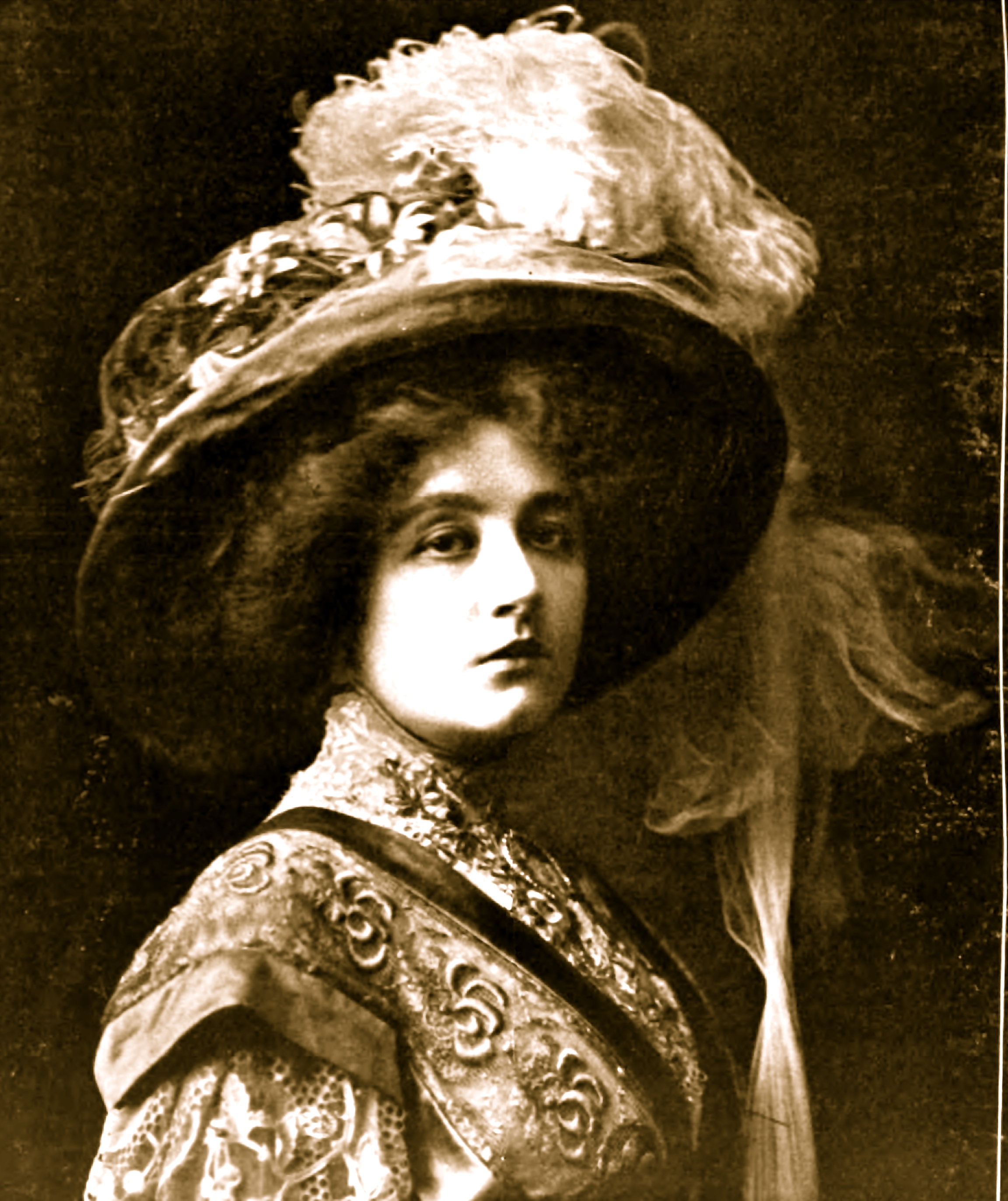
Lyricist Jean Lenox 1909

"I Don't Care" is a 1905 song, with words by Jean Lenox and music by Harry O. Sutton. It was originally performed by Eva Tanguay, becoming her most famous song and earning her the nickname "The I Don't Care Girl".

It was published by Jerome H. Remick & Co., New York, performed in the Ziegfeld Follies of 1909 and recorded by Eva Tanguay in 1922. It was featured in the 1949 film musical In the Good Old Summertime, where it was sung by Judy Garland, and later became a standard in her concerts.

It was also recorded by Mitzi Gaynor, Julie Andrews, and Eydie Gorme among others, sometimes with additional lyrics.

In the early '80s, textile manufacturer Milliken & Company used the song to advertise their chemically treated fabrics under the name Visa, "America's freedom fabric," touting the easiness of washing out tough stains from garments made from it.

In 1992, at the age of 10, Britney Spears performed a cover of the song on the US talent show Star Search.

Comedian Kevin Meaney would frequently sing the chorus in his stand-up sets if there seemed to be a lull in audience reactions to his material.
