= I Feel Pretty =

Song from West Side Story

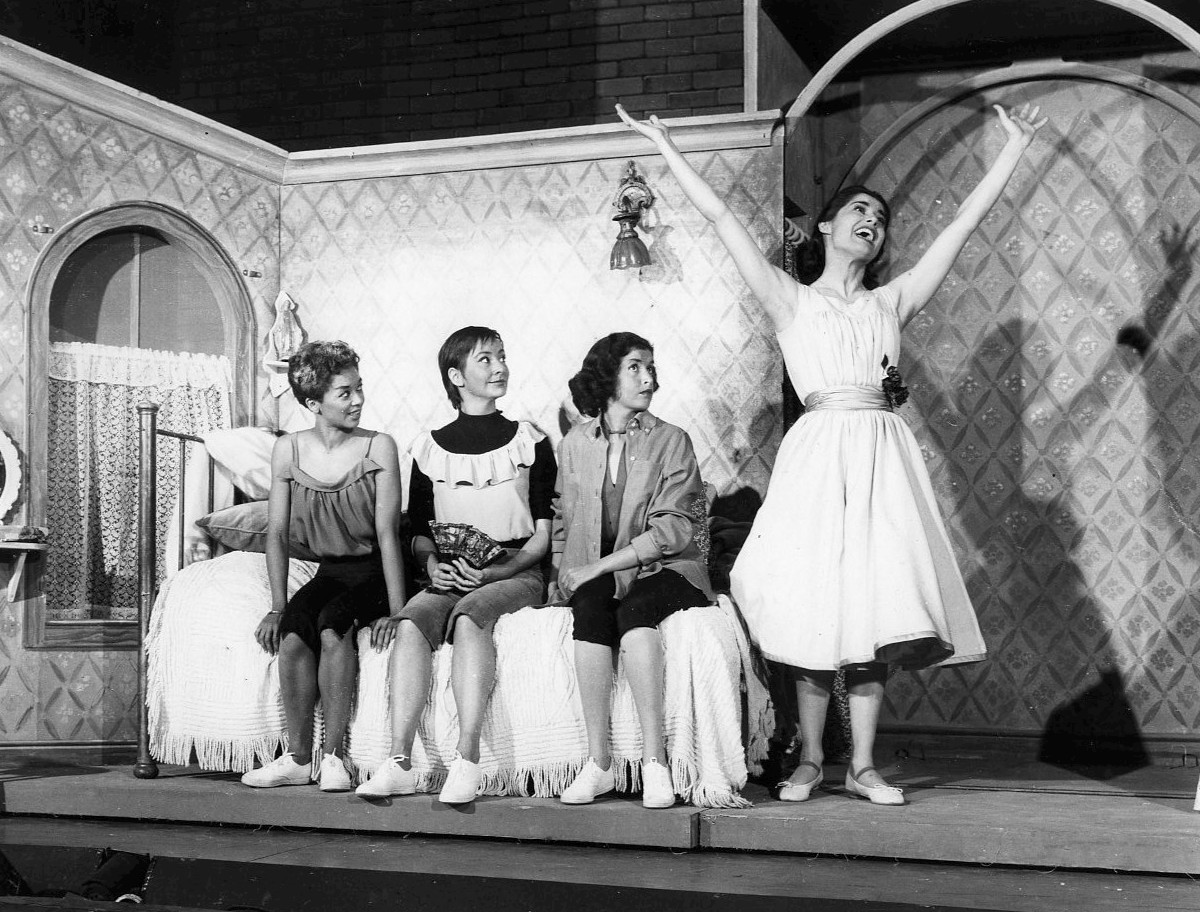
L-R: Elizabeth Taylor, Carmen Gutierrez, Marilyn Cooper, and Carol Lawrence from the original Broadway cast sing "I Feel Pretty" (1957)

"I Feel Pretty" is a song written by Stephen Sondheim and Leonard Bernstein from the 1957 musical West Side Story.

== Production ==
The New York Times explained that "Mr. Sondheim…has said he was never particularly fond of his lyrics in 'West Side Story,' especially 'I Feel Pretty'", later expressing that "The idea of the song is so simple".

The original stage version of the lyrics was changed in the making of the 1961 movie version of West Side Story because of a change in the setting of the scene. While the scene took place at night in the original, it was during the day in the movie. Therefore, the lyric 'I feel pretty and witty and bright/And I pity/Any girl who isn't me tonight' changed to 'I feel pretty, and witty and gay/And I pity/Any girl who isn't me today'. The lyrics were changed back to their original form for the 2021 film version.

The song was cut from the 2019 Broadway revival in order to streamline the plot and condense it to a 90-minute intermissionless show.

Steven Spielberg and Sondheim initially wanted to cut the song from the 2021 film, with the former questioning whether the upbeat song would still work without an intermission between it and the rumble. It was ultimately due to the intervention of screenwriter Tony Kushner that the song remained, as Spielberg later explained, "Tony [Kushner] explained to me, and then I explained to Stephen... that this is the first time in our story that the entire audience is ahead of Maria's story. And the audience will feel very protective of her because we know she’s about to find out."

== Synopsis ==
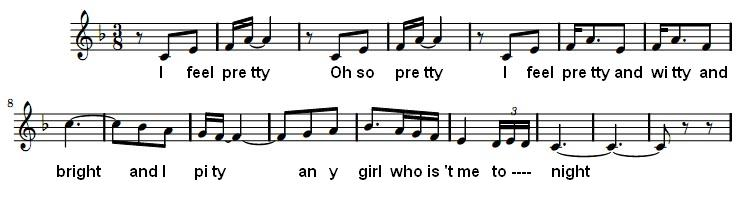
Sheet music of the melody to "I Feel Pretty".

In the musical and 2021 film version, Maria is not yet aware that her sweetheart, Tony, has just killed her brother Bernardo, while in the 1961 film version, the song occurs before Bernardo's death. In the bridal salon where she works (in the 1961 film; Gimbels in the 2021 film), Maria sings about being happy and feeling beautiful because she is "loved by a pretty wonderful boy", while her colleagues tease her about her silly behavior. Robert Cummings of AllMusic comments that the song "features one of Bernstein's more memorable melodies: its first four notes, deliciously rhythmic in their rising contour, repeat, then are reduced to three, then to two. …Bernstein's instrumentation colors the music with a Latin character…and so does the girls' chorus that enters midway through. Stephen Sondheim's lyrics deftly capture Maria's bliss and newfound sense of confidence".

== Reception ==
Birmingham Mail described the song as "delightful", while The Tab deemed it a "classic". Applause Meter called it "sweetly charming" and VCOnStage called it "operatic".

== Cover versions ==
The song has been covered by many artists, including Annie Ross and Julie Andrews. Little Richard covered the song as part of the 1996 RCA Victor tribute album The Songs of West Side Story.

The song was mashed up with the song "Unpretty" by TLC in a Glee episode to create "I Feel Pretty/Unpretty", a duet that attempts to show the irony in people feeling pretty on the outside but unpretty on the inside.

== Parodies ==
- On the children's show Sesame Street, episode 3522 (repeated as episode 3680), Oscar the Grouch's girlfriend, Grundgetta, is going to school to become a Grouch beautician. Upon explaining just that, she sings "I Feel Yucky" (a parody of "I Feel Pretty"), expressing how yucky she looks and feels, and how she wants everyone to look and feel that yucky also.
- The Simpsons parodies this song in Season 11 Episode 3 "Guess Who's Coming to Criticize Dinner?". Homer gets the perfect side job when he becomes the chief restaurant critic for The Springfield Shopper newspaper. In response, he celebrates by breaking out in song ("Homer's Food Song").
- On a 1975 episode of Saturday Night Live, guest host Madeline Kahn plays the Bride of Frankenstein, who rises from the slab and sings this song.
- In the Friends episode "The One with Chandler's Dad", Charles Bing (Kathleen Turner) sings the movie version of the song, with the lyrics "I feel pretty, and witty and gay".
- In the 1995 VeggieTales film Are You My Neighbor?, a version called "I'm Busy" is sung in the "Story of Flibber-o-loo" segment.
- In the 2003 film Anger Management, Buddy Rydell (Jack Nicholson) teases Dave Buznik (Adam Sandler) to sing "I Feel Pretty" in the middle of the Queensboro bridge.
- In T-Mobile's Super Bowl LVI commercial, which aired during the game on February 13, 2022, Zach Braff and Donald Faison (referencing their role in Scrubs) sing a parody of the song with the lyrics changed to being about 5G home internet, with Braff griping "about overpaying for the internet," while Faison boasts about his affordable deal.
