= By the Light of the Silvery Moon (song) =

"By The Light of the Silvery Moon"
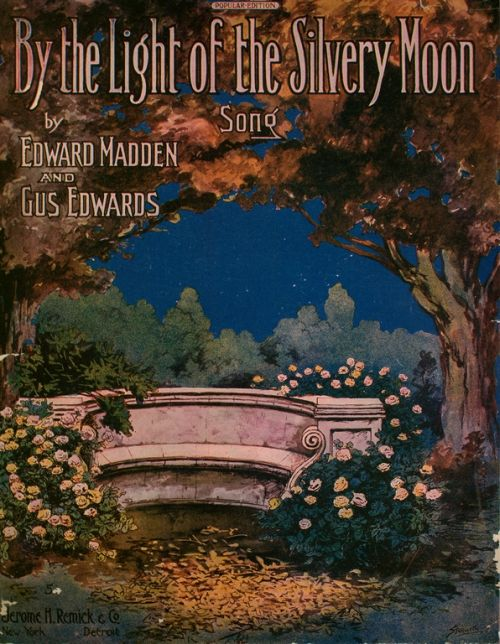
- Sheet music cover, 1909

Song
- Published: 1909 by Jerome H. Remick & Co.
- Composer: Gus Edwards
- Lyricist: Edward Madden

"By the Light of the Silvery Moon" or "By the Light of the Silv'ry Moon" is a popular love song. The music was written by Gus Edwards, and the lyrics by Edward Madden. The song was published in 1909 and first performed on stage by Lillian Lorraine in the Ziegfeld Follies of 1909. It was one of a series of moon-related Tin Pan Alley songs of the era. The song was also used in the short-lived Broadway show Miss Innocence (September 27-October 9, 1909) when it was sung by Frances Farr.

Popular recordings in 1910 were by Billy Murray and The Haydn Quartet; Ada Jones; and The Peerless Quartet.

The song has been used in a great many television shows and motion pictures. In 1935, the song in short was used in the Charles Laughton film Ruggles of Red Gap in a segue. Later, the movie of the same title was released in 1953, starring Doris Day. It served as a sequel to On Moonlight Bay, which also starred Doris Day.

The song was originally recorded in C Major, but has since been sung in E Major (Day) and in A Major by (Jimmy Bowen) with The Rhythm Orchids in Rock-a-Billy style that was a chart hit in 1957 and included a strong guitar solo by Don Lanier.

== Parody ==
Billy Murray recorded the song Stand Up and Sing for Your Father an Old Time Tune in 1923. The lyrics of Murray's song parody By the Light of the Silvery Moon, portraying an old man who found this new song frivolous.

Oh, I'm sick of all these ditties about "moon" and "spoon" and "June"
So, will you stand up, and sing for your father, an old time tune!

== Recordings ==
- Peerless Quartet – recorded November 1909 for Columbia Records (catalog 799).
- Ada Jones on Edison cylinder 10362; released May 1910.
- Billy Murray and the Haydn Quartet recorded on December 22, 1910 and released on Victor 16460.
- Ray Noble and His Orchestra (vocal by Snooky Lanson) – recorded November 17, 1941 for Columbia Records (catalog 36479). This was a minor chart hit in 1942 and 1944.
- Bing Crosby – recorded July 9, 1942 for Decca Records.
- Fats Waller and His Rhythm, vocal and piano by Fats Waller with the Deep River Boys. Recorded in New York City on July 13, 1942, released on the Bluebird label as catalog number B-11569, the RCA Victor label as catalog number 20-2448A, and by EMI in the UK on the His Master's Voice label as catalog number B 10748.
- Doris Day for her album By the Light of the Silvery Moon, Columbia Records, 1953
- Gordon MacRae and June Hutton – included in their album By the Light of the Silvery Moon (1953)
- Jackie Wilson, recorded in New York City on July 12, 1957. B-side to Reet Petite, a single released by Brunswick Records (1957).
- Etta James, a single release by Modern Records, (1957).
- William Frawley recorded a version of this song for his 1958 album of classic songs, Bill Frawley Sings the Old Ones.
- Jimmy Bowen released a version of the song as the B-side to his 1958 single The Two Step. It reached No. 50 on the US pop chart.
- Mitch Miller & The Gang – included as the A-side to the album Sing Along with Mitch, Columbia Records, 1958
- Gene Vincent for his album Gene Vincent Rocks! And The Blue Caps Roll, Capitol Records, (1958).
- Little Richard, recorded for Specialty Records, (1959). This reached No. 17 in the UK Singles Chart.
- Burl Ives – included in his album My Gal Sal and Other Favorites (1964).
- Ray Charles – included in his album Ray's Moods (1966)
- Julie Andrews – included in her album The World of Julie Andrews (1973)
- Joanna Dong – included in her album I am Real (2018) and also the soundtrack of MediaCorp drama series Blessings 2.

== Film appearances ==
- 1933 Turn Back the Clock – the Three Stooges make an early cameo appearance, singing this song.
- 1935 Ruggles of Red Gap – played during the opening credits. Also performed by Charles Laughton, Leila Hyams and the others.
- 1939 Idiot's Delight – Clark Gable sang excerpts from this song while performing in a singing act as part an underemployed showman.
- 1939 The Story of Vernon and Irene Castle – danced by Fred Astaire and Sonny Lamont.
- 1941 Babes on Broadway – performed by Ray McDonald as part of a minstrel show sequence.
- 1941 Birth of the Blues – sung by Bing Crosby.
- 1943 Heaven Can Wait – the song was used on the theme soundtrack by Alfred Newman.
- 1943 Hello, Frisco, Hello – sung by Alice Faye.
- 1945 Flame of Barbary Coast – performed on the stage of a gambling hall.
- 1945 Sunbonnet Sue – performed by group of singing quartet.
- 1946 The Jolson Story – the young Al Jolson, played by Scotty Beckett and voiced by Rudy Wissler, is shown singing the song in a theatre while performing in a double act with the character Steve Martin (William Demarest). Some license has been taken in this instance as by 1909, the year the song was published, Jolson was aged 23 and is meant to be in his early teens in the scene.
- 1949 Always Leave Them Laughing – sung and danced by Milton Berle and Bert Lahr.
- 1950 Two Weeks With Love – the song was performed by Jane Powell and Ricardo Montalbán, and by Louis Calhern, Ann Harding, Phyllis Kirk and chorus.
- 1953 By the Light of the Silvery Moon – performed by Doris Day, Gordon MacRae, Leon Ames, Rosemary DeCamp and others throughout the film.
- 1967 The Producers – Max (Zero Mostel) puts a coin in the jukebox of the bar where he is having a drink with Leo (Gene Wilder). The title he selects is "By the Light of the Silvery Moon". They both, accompanied by a drunkard, start singing the tune.
- 1968 The Killing of Sister George – Accompanies a drag performance filmed inside the Gateways club.
- 1984 Cannonball Run II – Tim Conway and Don Knotts, playing as a traffic cop duo, briefly sing this song in front of an abusive orangutan.
- 1988 18 Again! – performed by George Burns, Red Buttons and Charlie Schlatter.
- 1988 The Good, the Bad, and Huckleberry Hound – Huckleberry sings this song to Desert Flower, as opposed to his infamous rendition of "Oh My Darling, Clementine".
- 2003 The Haunted Mansion – the song is shortly featured and performed by the Singing Busts (The Dapper Dans).
- 2010 Scooby-Doo! Curse of the Lake Monster – Shaggy Rogers sings this song to Velma Dinkley, performed by Nick Palatas.

== In popular culture ==
- The song was featured in a 1931 Fleischer Studios Screen Songs cartoon, that featured Bimbo and Betty Boop and the voice of Eddie Cantor. An earlier Fleischer cartoon "By the Light of the Silvery Moon" (1926) was released in the Phonofilm sound-on-film process, as part of the Song Car-Tunes series.
- In a 1952 episode of I Love Lucy, "Lucy's Show Biz Swan Song", the song was sung by Lucy Ricardo and Ethel Mertz (Lucille Ball and Vivian Vance), while the characters were auditioning for Ricky's "Gay Nineties Revue".
- The song's patter is parodied in a popular The Rocky Horror Picture Show. Audience Participation line for the song "Eddie". lines like "By the light (not the dark but the light)" become lines like "From the day he was born (not the night but the day)" and "She tried in vain (not the artery but the vein)".
- In the January 27, 1976 episode of the ABC sitcom Happy Days, titled "Fonzie The Superstar", restaurant owner Arnold (Pat Morita) and Laverne and Shirley (Penny Marshall and Cindy Williams), stall for time by singing the song (very badly) onstage, for a teen audience waiting for Fonzie (Henry Winkler) to come out and sing.
- In an All in the Family episode (S6 E15), Archie Bunker and Barney Hefner sang the song as part of a minstrel show.
- The song is featured in the second episode of Boardwalk Empire.
- In 1991, the song is briefly sung by a group of human-themed Muppets called "The Three D's" in the preshow of Muppet*Vision 3D.
- Kidsongs, included in the music video Let's Put on a Show (1995).
- A season 4 (1997) episode of Boy Meets World, titled "B & B's B'n B", Cory, Shawn, and Topanga sing the song accompanied by the piano alongside their elderly bed and breakfast guests.
- In the Bear in the Big Blue House episode "And to All a Good Night", Bear and Shadow sing the song to wake up Tutter. Shadow sings the first half of the song before appearing. This is also used as instrumental background music for a scene involving the Harvest Moon Festival.
- An impromptu version of the song appears in the sixth episode of the Channel 4 sitcom GameFace (2017).

In the late 1970s/early 80s this song was a favourite of the travelling Grangemouth No1 supporters bus.

== External multimedia ==
- By the Light of the Silvery Moon, RealAudio file of 1910 performance by Ada Jones
- By the Light of the Silvery Moon
