= William Hargreaves =

British composer

William Joseph Hargreaves (1880–1941) was a British composer, mainly of songs for the music hall. His most famous composition was '"Burlington Bertie from Bow" in 1916 but he also wrote "Delaney's Donkey", "I Know Where the Flies Go", "PC 49", "We All Went Marching Home Again", "They Built Piccadilly For Me" and "Give My Regards to Leicester Square".

Hargreaves is also sometimes credited with several songs for Billy Williams, including "Postcards" (1908); and "I Must Go Home Tonight" (1909).

His "It's The Old Army Game" was added to the originally American musical Poppy when it was performed in London stage in 1924.

He was married to the American singer and male impersonator Ella Shields from 1906 to 1923, when she was granted a divorce. Hargreaves wrote "Burlington Bertie from Bow" for Shields; an earlier song with a similar title had been sung by Vesta Tilley.
