= Burlington Bertie =

Music hall song composed in 1900

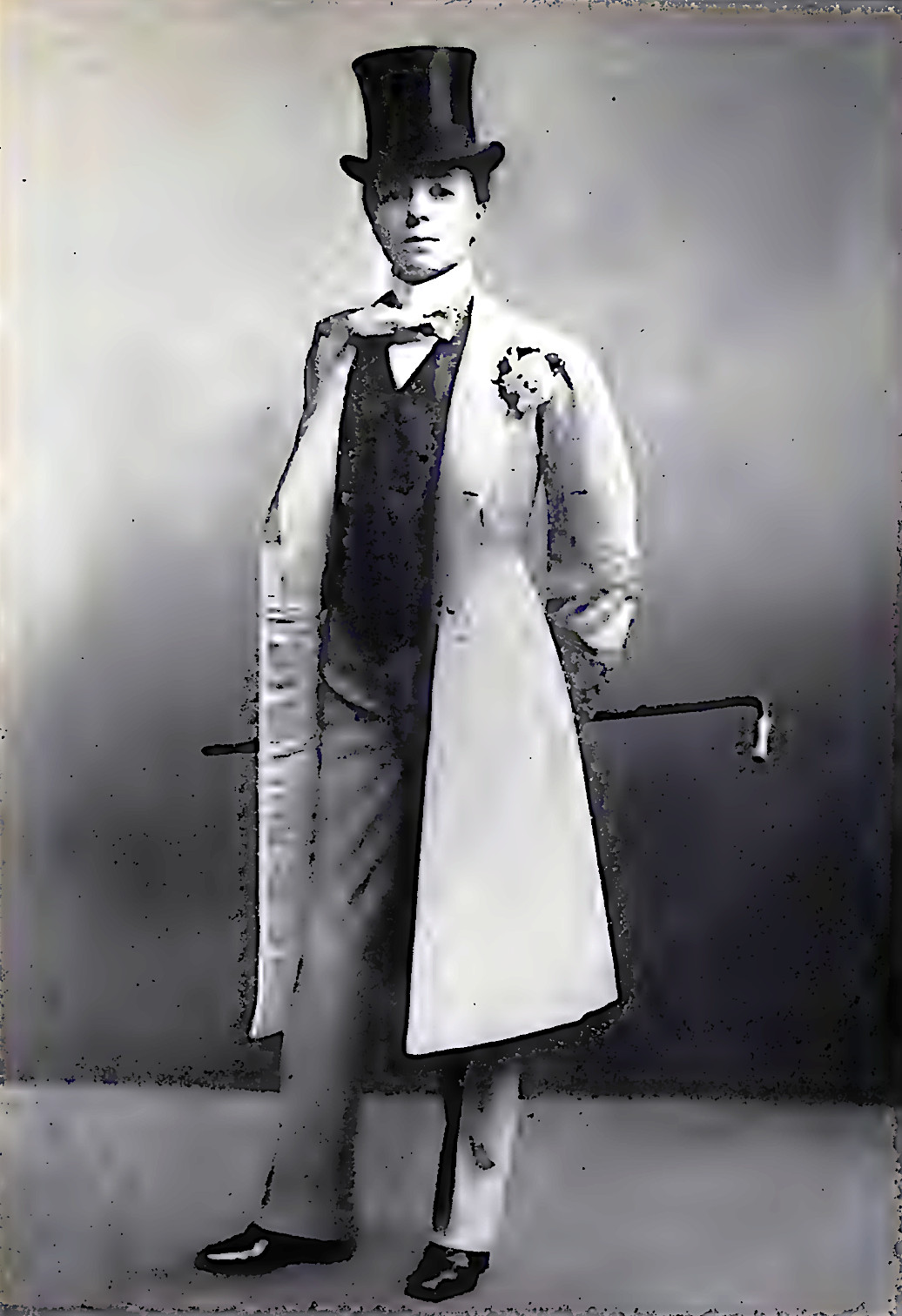
Vesta Tilley in character as Burlington Bertie

"Burlington Bertie" is a music hall song composed by Harry B. Norris in 1900 and notably sung by Vesta Tilley. It concerns an aristocratic young idler who pursues a life of leisure in the West End of London. Burlington is an upmarket London shopping arcade associated with luxury goods.

This song was parodied in the now-much-better-known "Burlington Bertie from Bow" (1915) credited to William Hargreaves and sung by his wife, Ella Shields, who performed the song whilst dressed in male attire as the sort of character known as a "broken down swell". Unlike the original song, Bertie's pretensions to gentility are belied by his residence in Bow, in the poverty-stricken Metropolitan Borough of Poplar, though his status as an idler ironically links him to the leisured aristocratic class, who reside in the West End.

== Later renditions ==
Betty Grable in the part of vaudevillian Myrtle McKinley Burt performed the song in the musical film Mother Wore Tights (1947).

Julie Andrews, also dressed in male attire, gave another rendition of the song in the film Star! (1968).

It was sung on episode 201 of The Muppet Show by a custom Bertie Muppet performed by Jerry Nelson.

It was referenced in the song "My Town" by the Canadian band Glass Tiger.

At the Royal Variety Performance in 1981, it was performed in the customary male evening dress by Anita Harris, who brought the house down with the line "I've just had a banana with Lady Diana" in the Buckingham Palace verse of the song. Although the Diana in the original version was probably Lady Diana Cooper, Prince Charles had married Lady Diana Spencer earlier in the year.

Dame Patricia Routledge performed an abridged version of the song and dance routine at the conclusion of episode six of the first series of Hetty Wainthropp Investigates. It was revealed, earlier in the episode, that the character had performed music hall routines in her youth, one being Burlington Bertie.

== Gambling terminology ==
In gambling terminology, or tic-tac, "Burlington Bertie" is rhyming slang for the fractional odds of 10/3, which is normally referred to as "one hundred to thirty".

In bingo calling "Burlington Bertie" is the call for 30.

== Recordings ==
A CD transfer recording of "Burlington Bertie from Bow" performed by Ella Shields is available from Windyridge.

A recording of "Burlington Bertie from Bow" was also made by Clinton Ford and appears on the collection Run to the Door.

== Lyrics of "Burlington Bertie" ==
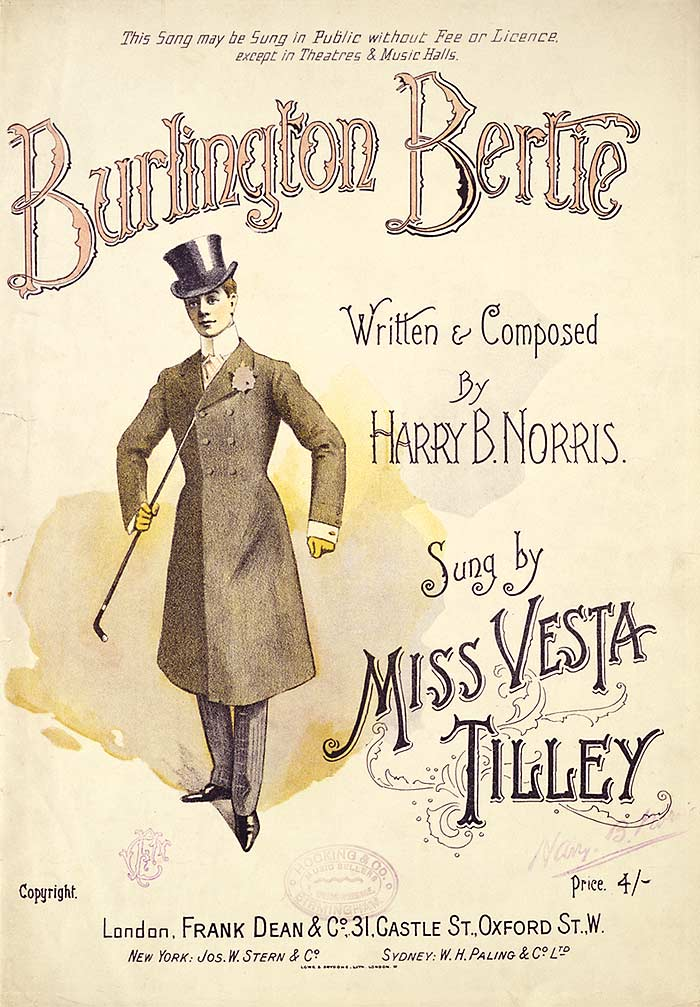
Cover of the original sheet music

Burlington Bertie's the latest young jay
He rents a swell flat somewhere Kensington way
He spends the good oof that his pater has made
Along with the brandy and soda brigade.
A girl wants a brooch or a new diamond ring
And thinks a seal jacket is just now the thing
Or sees a new bonnet she likes oh! So much
Her simple remark is, "Now who can I touch?"

Chorus:
What price Burlington Bertie,
the boy with the Hyde Park drawl,
What price Burlington Bertie,
the boy with the Bond Street crawl?
A nice little supper at the Savoy,
Oh! What a duck of a boy.
"So free," says she, "with L.s.d.,
Burlington Bertie's the boy for me."

When pretty young dancers are out of a shop;
When sweet little barmaids have just had to hop;
When singers cannot with their agents agree;
When trim little widows want someone for tea,
Who is it that turns up, the lonely girl's friend?
Who is it that nightly his club must attend?
Who is it drinks brandy and smokes strong cheroots?
Who is it that gets into bed with his boots?

Chorus:
What price Burlington Bertie,
the boy with the Hyde Park drawl,
What price Burlington Bertie,
the boy with the Bond Street crawl?
He drives from his club; what a lovely sight;
The cabby says "'Eres a wet night –
But free", says he, "with L.s.d.,
Burlington Bertie's the boy for me."

When there are symptoms of warlike alarm
And Burlington Bertie sees his brothers in arms,
Altho' absent minded he does not forget
That Englishmen always must pay off a debt.
He drops all his pleasures, the polo, the hunt
And just like the rest he is off to the front;
Altho' he's a johnny, he'll fight in the ruck,
He's wealthy and foolish, but if you want pluck –

Chorus:
What price Burlington Bertie,
the boy with the Hyde Park drawl,
What price Burlington Bertie,
the boy with the Bond Street crawl?
He'll fight and he'll die like an Englishman.
Forgive all his folly we can;
Says old John Bull, "I plainly see
These Burlington boys are the boys for me!"

Written and composed by Harry B. Norris.

== Lyrics of "Burlington Bertie from Bow" ==
Ella Shields performing Burlington Bertie from Bow

I'm Bert— p'raps you've heard of me
Bert— you've had word of me,
Jogging along
Hearty and strong
Living on plates of fresh air
I dress up in fashion
And when I am feeling depressed
I shave from my cuff all the whiskers and fluff
Stick my hat on and toddle up West

I'm Burlington Bertie, I rise at ten-thirty
and saunter along like a toff
I walk down the Strand with my gloves on my hand
Then I walk down again with them off
I'm all airs and graces, correct easy paces
Without food so long, I've forgot where my face is
I'm Bert, Bert, I haven't a shirt
But my people are well off you know.
Nearly everyone knows me from Smith to Lord Rosebr'y,
I'm Burlington Bertie from Bow.

I stroll— with Lord Hurlington,
Roll— in The Burlington
Call for champagne
Walk out again
Come back and borrow the ink
I live most expensive
Like Tom Lipton I'm in the swim
He's got so much 'oof' that he sleeps on the roof
And I live in the room over him.

I'm Burlington Bertie, I rise at ten thirty
And saunter along Temple Bar
As round there I skip
I keep shouting "Pip Pip!"
And the darn'd fools think I'm in my car
At Rothschild's I swank it
My body I plank it
On his front door step with the Mail for a blanket
I'm Bert, Bert, and Rothschild was hurt
He said, "You can't sleep there." I said, "Oh."
He said, "I'm Rothschild, sonny!" I said, "That's damn'd funny,
I'm Burlington Bertie from Bow"

I smile— condescendingly
While they're extending me
Cheer upon cheer
When I appear
Captain with my polo team
So strict are my people
They're William the Conqueror's strain
If they ever knew I'd been talking to you
Why, they'd never look at me again

I'm Burlington Bertie I rise at ten thirty
And reach Kempton Park around three
I stand by the rail, when a horse is for sale
And you ought to see Wootton watch me
I lean on some awning while Lord Derby's yawning
Then he bids two thousand, and I bid, "Good morning"
I'm Bert, Bert, I'd buy one, a cert
But where would I keep it, you know?
I can't let my man see me in bed with a gee-gee
I'm Burlington Bertie from Bow!

My pose, tho' ironical
Shows that my monocle
Holds up my face, keeps it in place,
Stops it from slipping away.
Cigars, cigars, haha
I smoke thousands,
I usually deal in The Strand
But you have to take care when you're getting them there
Or some idiot might step on your hand.

I'm Burlington Bertie, I rise at ten thirty
Then Buckingham Palace I view.
I stand in the yard while they're changing the guard
And the King shouts across, "Toodle-oo"!
The Prince of Wales' brother, along with some other,
Slaps me on the back and says, "Come and see Mother!"
I'm Bert, Bert, and royalty's hurt,
When they ask me to dine, I say no.
I've just had a banana with Lady Diana
I'm Burlington Bertie from Bow.
