= Claudette Colbert on stage, screen, radio and television =

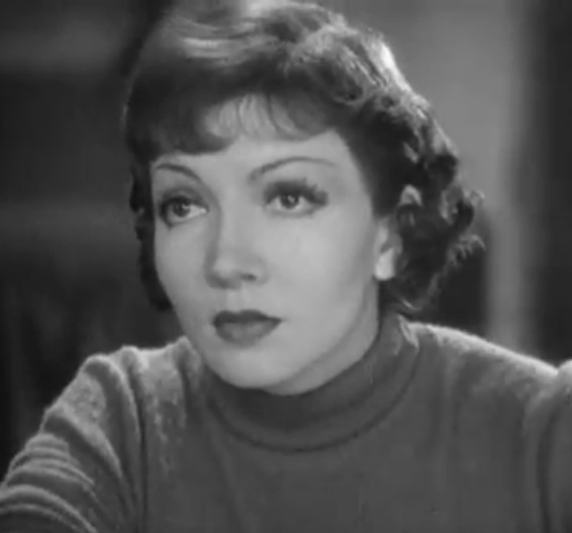
in I Cover the Waterfront (1933).

Claudette Colbert (1903–1996) was an American actress who won the Academy Award for Best Actress in It Happened One Night (1934). Also known as Lily Claudette Chauchoin, she had early passions for a career in fashion design. Although she is more generally remembered for her film work, Colbert's show business career began on stage, and theatrical work remained part of her professional life for six decades. It was her friend, Anne Morrison, an aspiring playwright, who nudged her towards the acting profession. She chose the professional name of Claudette Colbert, using a family name three generations removed on her father's side.

From 1923, Colbert began acting in small plays, she continued as a stage performer for six decades, appearing both on Broadway and in other venues around the United States. In 1985, she appeared with Rex Harrison in the Frederick Lonsdale play Aren't We All? at the Brooks Atkinson Theatre on Broadway.

She made 65 films during her career. Colbert began picking up main parts in early movies, beginning silent film For the Love of Mike in 1927. Colbert was nominated twice more for an Academy Award − in 1935's Private Worlds and 1944's Since You Went Away − but won neither. Her final theatrical film was in 1961, as Troy Donahue's mother in Parrish.

Colbert made numerous appearances on radio, most notably in the Lux Radio Theater, and sporadically on other radio programs. Over the decades, she appeared on several television shows, with her final appearance being The Two Mrs. Grenvilles miniseries in 1985, in which she played the wealthy mother-in-law of Ann-Margret.

Colbert received a star on the Hollywood Walk of Fame on February 8, 1960.

== Stage ==
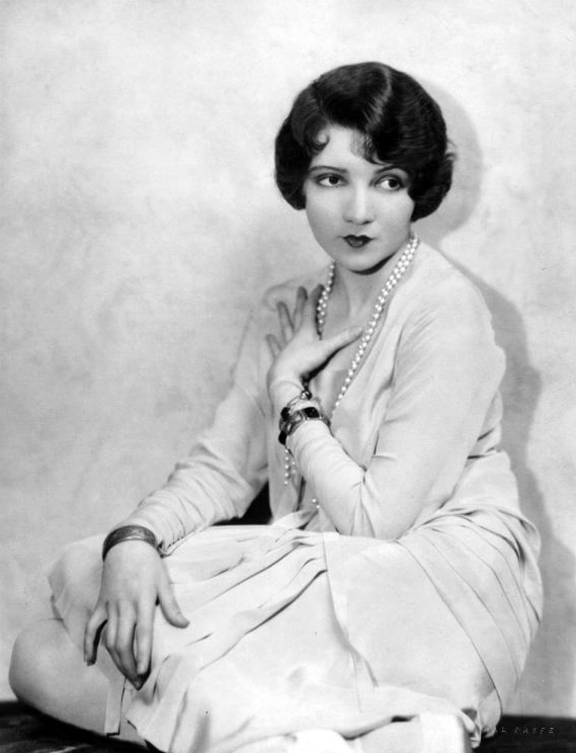
in La Gringa (1928)

Broadway stage credits
Title	Date	Role	Notes	Ref(s)
The Wild Westcotts	Dec 24, 1923 – Jan 1924	Sybil Blake	24 performances	
A Kiss in a Taxi	Aug 25 – Oct 1925	Ginette	103 performances	
The Ghost Train	Aug 25 – Oct 1926	Peggy Murdock	61 performances	
The Pearl of Great Price	Nov 01 – 30, 1926	Pilgrim	32 performances	
The Barker	Jan 18 – Jul 1927	Lou	221 performances	
The Mulberry Bush	Oct 26 – Nov 1927	Sylvia Bainbridge	29 performances	
La Gringa	Feb 1928	Carlota D'Astradente	13 performances	
Within the Law	Mar 1928	Agnes Lynch	16 performances	
Fast Life	Sep 26 – Oct 1928	Patricia Mason	21 performances	
Tin Pan Alley	Nov 1 – Dec 1928	Jill O'Dare	69 performances	
Dynamo	Feb 11 – Mar 1929	Ada Fife	50 performances	
See Naples and Die	Sep 24 – Nov 1929	Nanette Dodge Kosoff	62 performances	
Janus	Nov 24, 1955 – Jun 30, 1956	Jessica (replacement)	Unknown	
The Marriage-Go-Round	Oct 29, 1958 – Feb 13, 1960	Content Lowell, Ph.D., D.Litt., M.F.A., Soc.Sc., Dean of Women, Mrs. Paul Delville	431 performances	
Julia, Jake and Uncle Joe	Jan 28, 1961	Julia Ryan		
The Irregular Verb to Love	Sep 17 – Dec 28, 1963	Hedda Rankin	115 performances	
The Kingfisher	Dec 6, 1978 – May 13, 1979	Evelyn	118 performances	
A Talent for Murder	Oct 1 – Dec 6, 1981	Anne Royce McClain	77 performances	
Aren't We All?	Apr 29 – Jul 21, 1985	Lady Frinton	93 performances	

=== Other theater ===
- Island Fling (1951) in Westport, Connecticut
- Diplomatic Relations (1964–1965) in Miami, Florida
- Fabulous Forties (1972) in Manhattan, New York
- A Community of Two (1974) in across the U.S.

== Screen ==
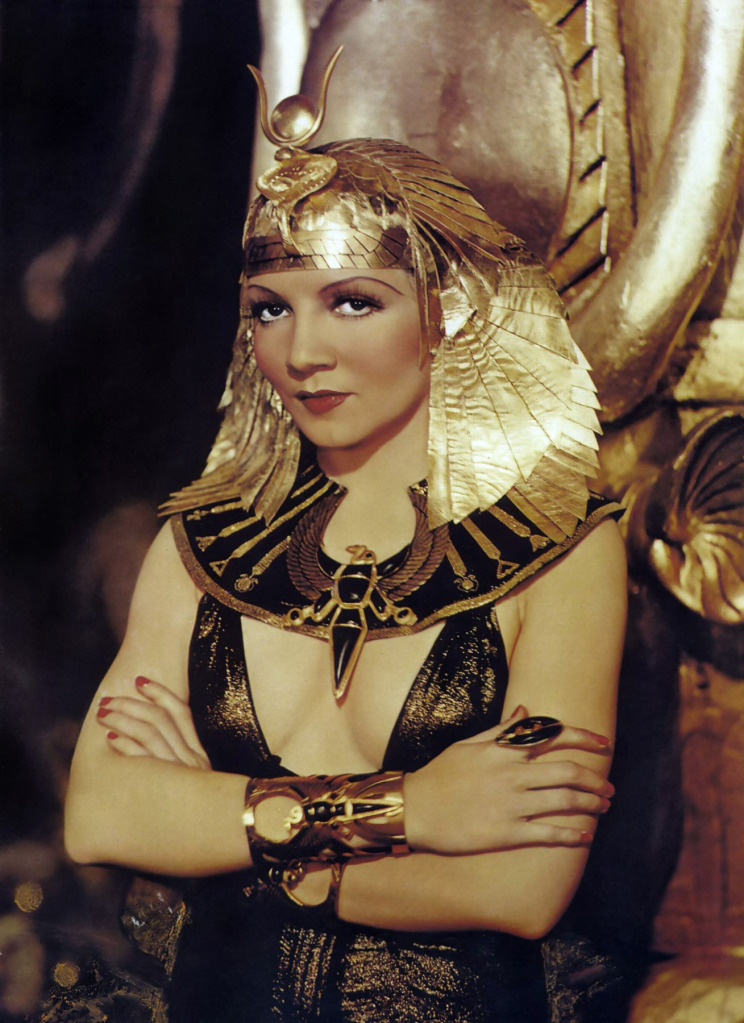
Colbert as Cleopatra (1934)

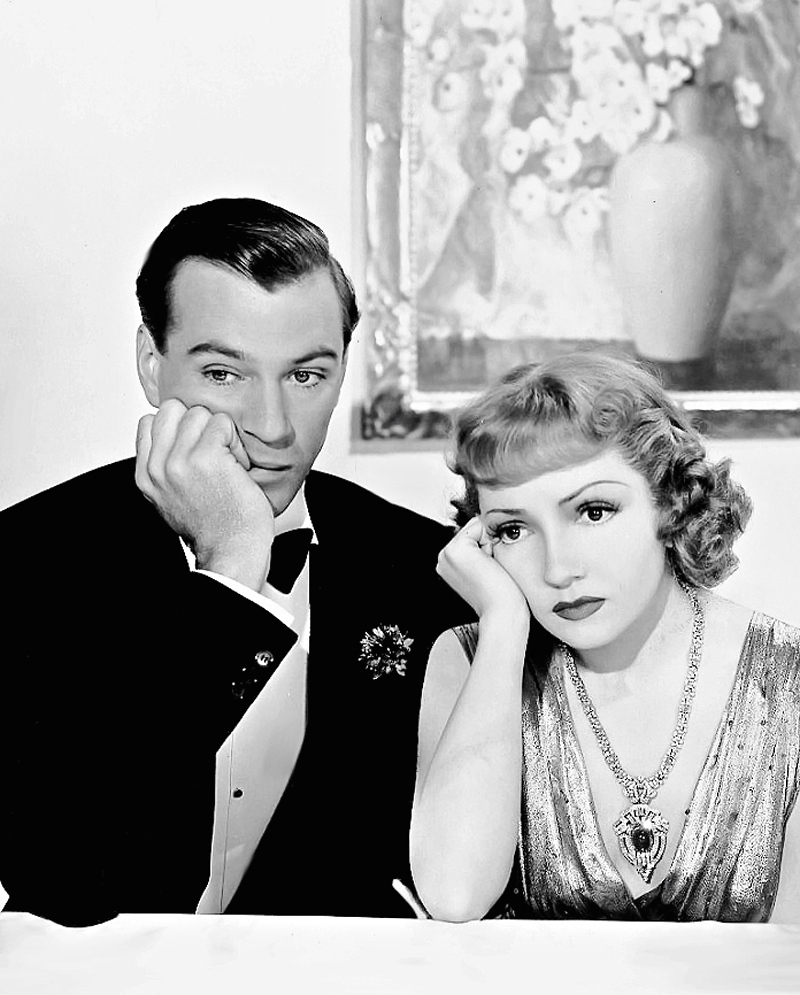
Gary Cooper and Colbert in Bluebeard's Eighth Wife (1936)

=== Feature length credits ===
Feature films
Title	Year	Role	Production company	Ref(s)
For the Love of Mike	1927	Mary	Robert Kane Productions	
The Hole in the Wall	1929	Jean Oliver	Paramount Pictures; Famous Players–Lasky	
The Lady Lies	1929	Joyce Roamer	Paramount Pictures; Famous Players–Lasky	
The Big Pond (aka La Grande Mare)	1930	Barbara Billings	Paramount Publix Corp.	
Young Man of Manhattan	1930	Ann Vaughn	Paramount Publix Corp.	
Manslaughter	1930	Lydia Thorne	Paramount Publix Corp.	
Mysterious Mr. Parkes (aka L'Énigmatique Monsieur Parkes)	1930	Lucy Stavrin	Paramount Pictures	
Honor Among Lovers	1931	Julia Traynor	Paramount Publix Corp. Preserved at UCLA Film and Television Archive	
The Smiling Lieutenant	1931	Franzi	Paramount Publix Corp. Preserved at UCLA Film and Television Archive	
Secrets of a Secretary	1931	Helen Blake	Paramount Publix Corp.	
His Woman	1931	Sally Clark	Paramount Publix Corp.	
The Wiser Sex	1932	Margaret Hughes (aka Ruby Kennedy)	Paramount Publix Corp.	
The Misleading Lady	1932	Helen Steele	Paramount Publix Corp.	
The Man from Yesterday	1932	Sylvia Suffolk	Paramount Publix Corp.	
The Phantom President	1932	Felicia Hammond	Paramount Publix Corp.	
The Sign of the Cross	1932	Empress Poppaea	Paramount Publix Corp. Preserved at UCLA Film and Television Archive	
Tonight Is Ours	1933	Princess/Queen Nadya	Paramount Productions Inc.	
I Cover the Waterfront	1933	Julie Kirk	Reliance Pictures, Inc.	
Three-Cornered Moon	1933	Elizabeth Rimplegar	Paramount Productions Inc.	
Torch Singer	1933	Sally Trent, aka Mimi Benton	Paramount Productions Inc.	
Four Frightened People	1934	Judy Jones	Paramount Pictures; Preserved at UCLA Film and Television Archive	
It Happened One Night	1934	Ellie Andrews	Columbia Pictures	
Cleopatra	1934	Cleopatra	Paramount Pictures; Preserved at UCLA Film and Television Archive	
Imitation of Life	1934	Beatrice 'Bea' Pullman	Universal Pictures	
The Gilded Lily	1935	Marilyn David	Paramount Pictures	
Private Worlds	1935	Dr. Jane Everest	Walter Wanger Productions	
She Married Her Boss	1935	Julia Scott	Columbia Pictures	
The Bride Comes Home	1935	Jeannette Desmereau	Paramount Pictures	
Under Two Flags	1936	Cigarette	20th Century Fox; Preserved at UCLA Film and Television Archive	
Tovarich	1937	Grand Duchess Tatiana Petrovna Romanov	Warner Bros.	
I Met Him in Paris	1937	Kay Denham	Paramount Pictures	
Maid of Salem	1937	Barbara Clarke	Paramount Pictures	
Bluebeard's Eighth Wife	1938	Nicole de Loiselle	Paramount Pictures	
Zaza	1938	Zaza	Paramount Pictures	
Midnight	1939	Eve Peabody	Paramount Pictures	
It's a Wonderful World	1939	Edwina Corday	Metro-Goldwyn-Mayer (MGM)	
Drums Along the Mohawk	1939	Lana Martin	20th Century Fox	
Boom Town	1940	Betsy Bartlett [McMasters]	MGM	
Arise, My Love	1940	Augusta	Paramount Pictures	
Skylark	1941	Lydia Kenyon	Paramount Pictures	
Remember the Day	1941	Nora Trinell	20th Century Fox	
The Palm Beach Story	1942	Geraldine 'Gerry' Jeffers	Paramount Pictures	
So Proudly We Hail!	1943	Lt. Janet Davy Davidson	Paramount Pictures	
No Time for Love	1943	Katherine Grant	Paramount Pictures	
Since You Went Away	1944	Mrs. Anne Hilton	Selznick International Pictures	
Practically Yours	1944	Peggy Martin	Paramount Pictures	
Guest Wife	1945	Mary Price	Greentree Productions	
Tomorrow Is Forever	1946	Elizabeth Hamilton	International Pictures	
Without Reservations	1946	Christopher Kit Madden	RKO Pictures	
The Secret Heart	1946	Leola 'Lee' Addams	MGM	
The Egg and I	1947	Betty MacDonald	Universal Pictures	
Sleep, My Love	1948	Alison Courtland	Triangle Productions, Inc. Preserved at UCLA Film and Television Archive	
Family Honeymoon	1949	Katie Armstrong Jordan	Universal-International	
Bride for Sale	1949	Nora Shelley	RKO Radio Pictures	
Three Came Home	1950	Agnes Newton Keith	20th Century Fox	
The Secret Fury	1950	Ellen R. Ewing	RKO Radio Pictures	
Thunder on the Hill	1951	Sister Mary Bonaventure	Universal Pictures	
Let's Make It Legal	1951	Miriam Halsworth	20th Century Fox	
The Planter's Wife (aka Outpost in Malaya)	1952	Liz Frazer	Pinnacle Productions	
Daughters of Destiny (aka Love, Soldiers and Women / Destinées)	1954	Elizabeth Whitefield	Arlan and Cinédis	
Royal Affairs in Versailles (aka Si Versailles m'était conté)	1954	Madame de Montespan	Cocinor	
Texas Lady	1955	Prudence Webb	RKO Radio Pictures	
Parrish	1961	Ellen McLean	Warner Bros.	

=== Short subjects ===
Short films
Title	Year	Notes	Ref(s)
Make Me a Star	1932	Unbilled cameo appearance. Paramount Publix Corp.	
Hollywood on Parade No. 9	1933	Preserved at UCLA Film and Television Archive	
Academy Awards	1935–1937	Hearst newsreel footage – film experts pick winners for 1934. Preserved at UCLA Film and Television Archive	
The Hollywood You Never See	1934	A behind-the-scenes look at the making of Cleopatra	
The Fashion Side of Hollywood	1935	A behind-the-scenes short	
Breakdowns of 1938	1938	Outtakes from several films, including Tovarich (1937).	
Hedda Hopper's Hollywood No. 6	1942	Gossip columnist Hedda Hopper covering two World War II benefit affairs	

== Radio ==
=== Lux Radio Theater ===
Between the years 1935 and 1954, Colbert made numerous appearances on the Lux Radio Theatre.

- "Holiday" (03/10/1935)
- "The Barker" (07/20/1936)
- "The Gilded Lily" (01/11/1937)
- "Hands Across the Table" (05/03/1937)
- "Alice Adams (1935 film)" (01/03/1938)
- "It Happened One Night" (03/20/1939)
- "The Ex-Mrs. Bradford" (06/19/1939)
- "The Awful Truth" (09/11/1939)
- "Midnight" (05/20/1940)
- "His Girl Friday" (09/30/1940)
- "The Shop Around the Corner" (06/23/1941)
- "Skylark" (02/02/1942)
- "Once Upon a Honeymoon" (04/12/1943)
- "So Proudly We Hail!" (11/01/1943)
- "Magnificent Obsession" (11/13/1944)
- "Practically Yours" (08/27/1945)
- "Tomorrow is Forever" (05/06/1946)
- "Without Reservations" (08/26/1946)
- "The Egg and I" (05/05/1947)
- "Family Honeymoon" (04/04/1949, 04/23/1951)
- "Bride for Sale" (06/05/1950)
- "Thunder on the Hill" (11/09/1953)
- "The Corn Is Green" (05/17/1954)

=== The Screen Guild Theater ===
She also participated in 13 episodes of radio's The Screen Guild Theater, between 1939 and 1952.

=== NBC radio show ===
- "The Old Gold Comedy Theatre: The Palm Beach Story" (10/29/1944)
- "Bob Hope Show: Guest Star Claudette Colbert" (04/01/1952)

Year	Program	Episode/source
1947	"This Is Hollywood"	"The Egg and I"
1950	"Hallmark Playhouse"	"The Egg and I"

== Television ==
Television credits
Title	Year/Date	Role	Notes	Ref(s)
The Jack Benny Program	April 5, 1951	Herself	Co-starred with Basil Rathbone and Robert Montgomery	
The Best of Broadway	September 15, 1954; May 2, 1955	Julie Cavendish / Actress	"The Royal Family" "The Guardsman"	
The Ford Television Theatre	1955 (January 5 / April 28)	Lorna Gilbert / Elizabeth Hopkins	"Magic Formula" "While We're Young"	
Climax!	1955 (April 7 / May 5)	Dr. Jane Everest / Sister Cecilia	"Private Worlds" "The Deliverance of Sister Cecilia"	
The Colgate Comedy Hour	November 27, 1955	Herself	"Special Awards Presentation" at the Cocoanut Grove in Hollywood	
Letter to Loretta	December 4, 1955	Herself – Guest Hostess	"A Pattern of Deceit"	
Ford Star Jubilee	January 14, 1956	Ruth Condomine	"Blithe Spirit"	
Robert Montgomery Presents	September 24, 1956	Unknown	"After All These Years"	
Playhouse 90	1957 (February 14 / 21）	The Emcee / Betsy Gregg	"The Comedian" "One Coast of White"	
Zane Grey Theatre	October 11, 1957; November 10, 1960	Lucy Horncuff / Beth Brayden	"Blood in the Dust" "So Young the Savage Land"	
General Motors 50th Anniversary Show	November 17, 1957	Mrs. Collier		
Telephone Time	December 3, 1957	Mary Roberts Rinehart	"Novel appeal"	
General Electric Theater	1958 (February 16 / 23)	Edith Miller	The Last Town Car, Part 1 The Last Town Car, Part 2	
The Steve Allen Show	1958 (April 27 / November 23)	Herself		
Colgate Theatre	September 30, 1958	Elizabeth Harper	"The Claudette Colbert Show" (aka "Welcome to Washington"）	
What's My Line?	September 30, 1958	Herself	the Mystery Guest	
Woman!	May 19, 1959	Host	documentary	
The Bells of St. Mary's	October 27, 1959	Sister Benedict	TV movie	
The Outer limits	September 16, 1963		ABC, "The Galaxy Being"	
Instant Maxwell House Coffee	aired in from 1963 to 1965	Herself	TV commercials	
Yesterday's Witness	April 6, 1972	Herself – Narrator	BBC, "Sylvia of Sarawak"	
The American Film Institute Salute to Frank Capra	1982	Herself		
The Two Mrs. Grenvilles	1987	Alice Grenville		

== Audiobook ==
- Gift from the Sea (1986, as narrator)

== Bibliography ==
- Crump, William D. (2013). The Christmas Encyclopedia, 3d ed. McFarland. ISBN 978-1-4766-0573-9.
- Dick, Bernard F. (2008). Claudette Colbert : She Walked in Beauty. Jackson: University Press of Mississippi. ISBN 978-1-60473-329-7.
- Sonneborn, Liz (2002). A to Z of American Women in the Performing Arts. New York : Facts on File. pp. 41–43. ISBN 978-0-8160-4398-9.
- Quirk, Lawrence J. (1985). Claudette Colbert An Illustrated Biography. Crown Publishers. ISBN 0-517-55678-2.

(subscription required)
