= The Lass with the Delicate Air =

Studio album by Julie Andrews
- Released: 1957
- Genre: Folk
- Label: RCA Victor

Julie Andrews chronology
Tell It Again (1957)	The Lass with the Delicate Air (1957)	Julie Andrews Sings (1958)

The Lass with the Delicate Air is the first solo studio album by English actress and singer Julie Andrews, released by RCA Victor in mono in 1957, with a stereo edition following in 1958. The record features English ballads and British folk songs, including the title track and other traditional pieces that were part of the artist’s early repertoire. The arrangements and production were handled by Irwin Kostal, who later collaborated with Andrews on her most celebrated film musicals.

The album was released at a time when Andrews was establishing her career on stage and television, having received an Emmy nomination that same year. Despite the label’s preference for more popular material, she chose a traditional repertoire, believing it was important to record those works at that stage of her career.

Music critics highlighted the "charm" of her voice and the "nostalgic" selection of songs. However, the album did not achieve significant commercial success.

== Album details ==
The album features a collection of English ballads and British folk songs, including the titled track (originally composed by Michael Arne in 1762), "Canterbury Fair" and "Where'er You Walk". The latter held particular significance for Andrews, as it was part of her childhood repertoire with her stepfather.

Irwin Kostal served as arranger and conductor for the album, initiating a long-standing collaboration with Andrews. He would later take on the same roles in the acclaimed film productions Mary Poppins and The Sound of Music. Andrews recalled that at the time of the recording, she appeared so young that she had difficulty hailing a taxi and had to walk to the recording session in the pouring rain.

In the same year of its release, Andrews was nominated at the 10th Primetime Emmy Awards for her performance in the television musical adaptation of Rodgers and Hammerstein’s Cinderella. The singer later reflected that RCA Victor had hoped she would choose more popular songs for the album, but she was determined to record these selections, believing that such minor classics would become more challenging for her to sing in the future.

== Promotion ==
In 1966, when the artist was at the peak of her career with her film productions Mary Poppins and The Sound of Music, the Australian division of RCA Victor declared "May Is Julie Andrews Month" and launched a promotional campaign featuring four albums by the beloved star: The Lass with the Delicate Air, Rose Marie, The Boy Friend, and Julie Andrews Sings.

== Critical reception ==
Professional ratings
Review scores
Source	Rating
AllMusic	3.5/5 stars

The Sunday Herald named "London Pride" and "The Floral Dance" as "real charmers", and humorously criticized the mislabeling of Handel's aria "Where'er You Walk" as a ballad. Cash Box wrote that Andrews "displays her beautiful vocal abilities on an array of tunes, many of which are traditional British selections". Calgary Herald offered a more mixed review, acknowledging Andrews' technical and emotional proficiency in songs like "Pedro, the Fisherman" but critiquing her attempt at "Where'er You Walk" as being "out of her range". This contrasts with the Ottawa Citizen, which lauded her "clarity of tone" and charm across the album, including the same aria.

The Age wrote: "Miss Andrew's charming voice is not without its limits, but in her records she sings only numbers that her vocal range can encompass". Other reviews include that of the Star-News newspaper whose reviewer mentioned favorably the album briefly ("[the] album is worth a whirl. She puts the honey in English folk songs"), and the unfavorable one by The New York Times who wrote that the results of the album seemed "too prim and proper for the material".

In a retrospective review, AllMusic praised Andrews for her "appealing" voice and the "tastefully arranged and conducted" songs by Irwin Kostal, adding that the album "demonstrated another side of her talent to her Broadway admirers".

== Commercial performance ==
Although Cash Box magazine said in its review of the album that the "disk should get wide dee-jay and sales play", according to Robert Windeler, writer of Julie Andrews — A Biography, Andrews's solo albums released between the late 1950s and early 1960s, like The Lass with the Delicate Air, did not charted, which prevented her from making more albums later on.

== Track listing ==
No.	Title	Writer(s)	Length
1.	"As I Went A-Roaming"	Helen Taylor, May Brahe	2:14
2.	"London Pride"	Noël Coward	3:20
3.	"The Floral Dance"	Katie Moss	3:22
4.	"These Precious Things"	Billy Mayerl, Howard Alexander	3:05
5.	"Where'er You Walk"	George Frideric Handel, H. Heale	4:44
6.	"Pedro, The Fisherman"	Harold Purcell, Harry Parr Davies	3:52
7.	"Tally-Ho!"	Franco Leoni	2:00
8.	"If My Songs Were Only Winged"	Reynaldo Hahn, Victor Hugo	1:58
9.	"The Lass With The Delicate Air"	Michael Arne, Max Spicker	2:56
10.	"Canterbury Fair"	James Dyrenforth, Kenneth L. Smith	2:51
11.	"To A Wild Rose"	Edward MacDowell, R. H. Elkin	2:45
12.	"O The Days Of The Kerry Dancing"	James Lyman Molloy, Hugo Frey	3:56

== Personnel ==
Credits adapted from the liner notes of The Lass With The Delicate Air record.

- Arranged By, Conductor – Irwin Kostal
- Photography By [Photo] – David B. Hecht
