= Rose-Marie (1958 cast recording) =

Cast recording by Julie Andrews, Giorgio Tozzi
- Released: 1958
- Recorded: July 1958
- Genre: Show tune
- Label: RCA Victor

Julie Andrews chronology
Julie Andrews Sings (1958)	Rose-Marie (1958)	My Fair Lady (1959)

Rose-Marie is the cast recording of the operetta-style musical of the same name, released by RCA Victor in 1958 and starring Julie Andrews and Giorgio Tozzi. The work is based on the 1924 Broadway operetta set in the Canadian Rockies and includes songs such as "Indian Love Call", "Rose Marie", and "Totem Tom-Tom". The recording was produced in London and conducted by Lehman Engel.

The album presented Andrews in the title role, performing alongside Tozzi, with support from the Michael Sammes Singers and the New Symphony Orchestra. It was released in stereo, and noted as the most complete recordings of the musical.

Upon release, Rose-Marie received generally favorable reviews and was later reissued on CD with additional historical material. The recording is considered part of Andrews's early discography and was included in promotional campaigns highlighting her albums during the 1960s.

== Background and release ==
Produced by RCA Victor in 1958, this recording captures the melodies and romantic storyline of the 1924 Broadway musical, which is notable for being the first Broadway musical set in Canada and the first to play at London's Drury Lane Theatre. The story, set in the Canadian Rockies, follows Rose-Marie, a young woman who falls in love with a Mountie, and features songs such as "Indian Love Call", "Rose Marie" and "Totem Tom-Tom". The recording was made in London, with Lehman Engel directing the Michael Sammes Singers and the New Symphony Orchestra, and it benefits from the advancements in stereophonic sound technology of the time. The stereo LP was the most complete recording of the musical to date.

Julie Andrews takes on the role of Rose-Marie, a partially Native American character, even though she does not adopt the pidgin English originally associated with the role. Giorgio Tozzi, an accomplished opera singer, provides a counterpoint to Andrews' lighter, more lyrical voice. According to some critics, their duets, particularly "Indian Love Call", are highlights of the recording.

In 1966, when Andrews was at the peak of her career after her film productions Mary Poppins and The Sound of Music, RCA of Australia declared "May Is Julie Andrews Month" and launched a promotional campaign featuring four albums by the beloved star: The Lass with the Delicate Air, Rose-Marie, The Boy Friend, and Julie Andrews Sings.

== Critical reception ==
Professional ratings
Review scores
Source	Rating
AllMusic	3.5/5 stars

Cash Box considered it "a fine, faithful revival of the melodic work". The Sun and The Sunday Sun praised the stereo recording, highlighting the chemistry between Andrews and Tozzi in their duet "Indian Love Call". The Montreal Gazette wrote: "It is a good production although Tozzi overshadows Julie Andrews vocally".

Meanwhile, Ottawa Citizen noted that the singers "are in great vocal form", and the Saskatoon Star-Phoenix stated that the musical's melodies and the strong performances of the leads, made it "a very acceptable record". The French journal L'Action Catholique wrote that "Julie Andrews and Giorgio Tozzi, sing with style, and we truly have light music of a classical kind rather than strident 'popular' music".

William Ruhlmann of AllMusic while reviewing the 2009 edition, Selections from Rose-Marie, wrote: "There isn't any real effort at character realism here, as the singers simply try to sing the score as well as they can, and that turns out to be very good".

== CD releases ==
In 2009, the Sepia Records released the 1958 studio cast recording along with additional historical material such as tracks from the original 1925 London cast and performances by Jeanette MacDonald and Nelson Eddy from the 1936 film. This unauthorized edition was possible because the original recording had entered the public domain in Europe. According to William Ruhlmann of AllMusic, while not an authorized release, the Sepia version offers a unique comparative perspective on the musical's legacy The CD was rated three out of five stars by Stage on Disc website. Another CD by Flare Record (also unauthorized thanks to European public domain) was released the same year. It was titled Rose-Marie • Show Boat, and includes all the songs from both cast recording original albums. It received no stars (out of five) from Cast Albums Reviews website, and three and a half stars from AllMusic.

== Track listing ==
Side A
No.	Title	Writer(s)	Performer (s)	Length
1.	"Overture"	Friml, Stothart, Harbach, Hammerstein II	The New Symphony Orchestra Of London	2:32
2.	"Rose Marie"	Harbach, Hammerstein II, Friml	Giorgio Tozzi	2:56
3.	"Hard Boiled Herman"	Friml, Stothart, Harbach, Hammerstein II	Meier Tzelniker, Frances Day, Boys Chorus	2:11
4.	"The Mounties"	Friml, Stothart, Harbach, Hammerstein II	Frederick Harvey, Boys Chorus	2:20
5.	"Lak Jeem"	Friml, Stothart, Harbach, Hammerstein II	Julie Andrews, Boys Chorus	1:49
6.	"Indian Love Call"	Friml, Stothart, Harbach, Hammerstein II	Julie Andrews, Giorgio Tozzi	5:46

Side B
No.	Title	Writer(s)	Performer (s)	Length
7.	"Pretty Things"	Friml, Stothart, Harbach, Hammerstein II	Julie Andrews, Chorus	2:11
8.	"Why Shouldn't We"	Friml, Stothart, Harbach, Hammerstein II	Meier Tzelniker, Frances Day	2:30
9.	"Totem Tom-Tom"	Friml, Stothart, Harbach, Hammerstein II	Meier Keene, Chorus	2:44
10.	"Finale, Act I"	Friml, Stothart, Harbach, Hammerstein II	Julie Andrews, Frances Day, Frederick Harvey, Meier Tzelniker, Tudor Evans, John Hauxvell, Chorus	3:45
11.	"Finaletto, Act II"	Friml, Stothart, Harbach, Hammerstein II	Julie Andrews, Giorgio Tozzi, Tudor Evans, John Hauxvell, Marion Keene	1:27
12.	"Minuet Of The Minute"	Friml, Stothart, Harbach, Hammerstein II	Julie Andrews, Maier Tzelnike, Full Choir	3:39
13.	"Door Of My Dreams"	Friml, Stothart, Harbach, Hammerstein II	Julie Andrews, Chorus	2:26
14.	"Finale Ultimo"	Friml, Stothart, Harbach, Hammerstein II	Julie Andrews, Giorgio Tozzi	2:43

== Personnel ==
Credits adapted from the liner notes of Rose-Marie cast record.

- Lyrics by Otto Harbach and Oscar Hammerstein 2nd
- Music by Rudolf Friml and Herbert Stothart
- Illustration – A Parker
- Liner Notes – Stanley Green
- The Michael Sammes Singers and the New Symphony Orchestra of London under the direction of Lehman Engel

The Cast

- Rose-Marie La Flamme... Julie Andrews
- Jim Kenyon... Giorgio Tozzi
- Hard-Boiled Herman... Meier Tzelniker
- Lady Jane... Frances Day
- Wanda... Marion Keene
- Sergeant Malone... Frederick Harvey
- Emile La Flamme... John Hauxwell
- Edward Hawley... Tudor Evans
