= Tell It Again – Songs of Sense and Nonsense =

Tell It Again

Studio album by Julie Andrews, Martyn Green
- Released: 1957
- Genre: Children's music
- Label: Angel Records

Julie Andrews chronology
Cinderella (1956)	Tell It Again (1957)	The Lass with the Delicate Air (1957)

Tell It Again – Songs of Sense and Nonsense is a studio album by Julie Andrews and Martyn Green, released in 1957 by Angel Records. It features children's songs and nursery rhymes composed and arranged by Louis Hardin, known as Moondog, who also performed on the album playing instruments such as flute, guitar, and tabla. The collection includes classics like "Mary Had a Little Lamb" and "Star Light Star Bright" presented in inventive arrangements that use unusual time signatures.

The album received positive reviews for its creativity and charm, with some describing it as "enchanting" and praising its production quality. Although it did not chart, critics highlighted its originality and appeal to both children and adults.

== Album details ==
The album features a selection of children's songs, nursery rhymes, and whimsical melodies, composed and arranged by Louis Hardin, also known as Moondog, a musician and inventor of musical instruments. In addition to his work as a composer, Moondog performed on the album, playing various instruments including the flute, guitar, and tabla, contributing to its distinctive sound.

The album includes renditions of well-known classics such as "Mary Had a Little Lamb" "Pussy Cat", and "Star Light Star Bright". These familiar tunes are presented through arrangements that blend traditional elements with Moondog's experimental musical style. According to Julie Andrews, the compositions incorporate unusual time signatures, such as 5/4 and 7/8, which added a unique and technically complex dimension to the recording process. Andrews referred to Moondog as a "brilliant" and "unconventional" artist and described his music as both "inventive" and "enjoyable" to perform, despite its challenges.

== CD release ==
The album has never been officially reissued on CD, but it was released twice in Europe, both times taking advantage of the region's 50-year copyright limit. In 2009, the British reissue label Poppydisc released the first unauthorized version, followed later that year by Avid Easy's Julie Andrews: Four Classic Albums, a two-CD compilation featuring four of Andrews' albums from the late 1950s: Tell It Again (1957), The Lass with the Delicate Air (1957), Julie Andrews Sings (1958) and My Fair Lady (1959). AllMusic's William Ruhlmann rated the compilation three and a half stars, noting that Andrews' fans might find this reissue particularly intriguing thanks to the inclusion of Tell It Again.

== Critical reception ==
Professional ratings
Review scores
Source	Rating
AllMusic	4/5 stars

Gordon Jocelyn, a critic for The Montreal Gazette, highlighted the "enchanting" nature of the album. Billboard's critic described the album as a "delightful package" and praised it for its "excellent production". The music critic from AllMusic rated the album four out of five stars, but the site did not write any reviews for the album. In a later review for a collection of which the album was part, AllMusic's William Ruhlmann commented: "Not only is it unusual to hear her [Julie Andrews] trading nursery rhymes with Green and the two pretending to be brother and sister, but the musical accompaniment is surprising".

== Commercial performance ==
Although the album did not chart on Billboard's music rankings, it received attention in the press. Billboard wrote that the release had "strong sales potential in its specialized market".

== Track listing ==
No.	Title	Writer(s)	Length
1.	"Favorite Nursery Rhymes"	Louis Hardin, Moondog	5:56
2.	"School Days and Learning Songs"	Louis Hardin, Moondog	7:19
3.	"Songs of Fun and Nonsense"	Louis Hardin, Moondog	6:51
4.	"The Animal World"	Louis Hardin, Moondog	6:38
5.	"Bedtime Songs and Lullabies"	Louis Hardin, Moondog	3:18

== Personnel ==
Credits adapted from the liner notes of Tell It Again - Songs Of Sense and Nonsense record.

- Directed by Julie Laurence
- Music by Moondog
- Produced by Young Record World
- Percussion by Moondog
- Flute by Julius Baker
- Photography by David Gahr
