= High Tor (album) =

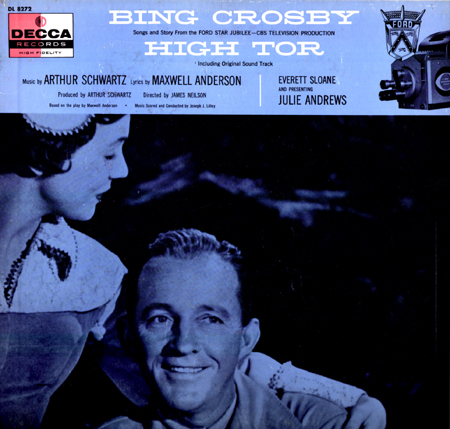

Soundtrack album by Bing Crosby, Julie Andrews, Everett Sloane
- Released: 1956
- Genre: Popular
- Length: 29:04
- Label: Decca
- Producer: Arthur Schwartz

Bing Crosby, Julie Andrews, Everett Sloane chronology
Blue Hawaii (1956)	High Tor (1956)	A Christmas Sing with Bing Around the World (1956)

Julie Andrews chronology
The Boy Friend (1954)	High Tor (1956)	My Fair Lady (1956)

Singles from High Tor
- 1. "When You're in Love" / "John Barleycorn" Released: 1956

High Tor (official title including subtitle: High Tor — Songs and Story From The Ford Star Jubilee — CBS Television Production) is a soundtrack album released by Decca Records under catalog number DL 8272. It is associated with the 1956 CBS television adaptation of High Tor, a musical version of Maxwell Anderson's 1936 stage play, presented as part of the Ford Star Jubilee program broadcast on March 10, 1956. The made-for-television production starred Bing Crosby, Julie Andrews, and Everett Sloane, featuring original music by composer Arthur Schwartz with lyrics by Anderson himself.

Decca announced in early 1956 that it would issue the original cast album from the television adaptation. Prior to the broadcast, Decca pre-released two tracks to radio stations and DJs: "When You're in Love" and "John Barleycorn". The album was also part of a broader promotional campaign supported by Ford Motors and CBS affiliates, which included promotional tie-ins, merchandising, and displays at Ford dealers across the country.

Despite the initial vinyl release, the album remained unavailable on compact disc (CD) for decades, and was finally released on CD in 2017, in compliance with current U.K. public domain laws.

== Background and production ==
High Tor was conceived as a musical television adaptation of Maxwell Anderson's 1936 play, a poetic fantasy exploring the conflict between commercial interests and natural preservation. The television version, aired as part of CBS's Ford Star Jubilee series, featured music by Arthur Schwartz and retained lyrics written by Anderson himself.

The story centers on Van Van Dorn, portrayed by Bing Crosby, a man who resists selling his land to real estate developers, entangling him in both spiritual and romantic dilemmas. Julie Andrews played the female lead in one of her earliest American television appearances.

This production was notable for its early use of color television and high production values. Its broadcast on March 10, 1956, represented a major television event. The musical included new material specifically composed for this adaptation.

In anticipation of the broadcast, Decca Records executed a strategic promotional campaign to capitalize on the show's visibility. Two songs ("When You're in Love" and "John Barleycorn") were distributed in advance to generate buzz, with extensive promotion arranged through radio, CBS affiliates, and Ford dealerships. Billboard included the songs in its "Popular Records" list and gave the album a score of 75.

== CD reissue ==
Despite the initial promotional push and critical support, the High Tor album did not receive an official CD release for many years. As noted in later discographic sources, MCA (the corporate successor to Decca) had not issued the soundtrack in digital format as of recent decades. However, in accordance with U.K. public domain regulations, a limited-edition CD reissue of the High Tor "songs and story" album was eventually released by Stage Door Records in 2017 (catalogue No. STAGE 2420). This reissue included the original LP tracks along with two bonus renditions of "When You're in Love" performed by The Lancers and The Leroy Holmes Orchestra. The CD was limited to just 500 copies. Julie Andrews' songs from the film were included on the Sepia Records CD Once Upon a Time (Sepia 1103) released in 2007.

== Critical reception ==
Cash Box wrote "Best song bets for pop hits are "WhenYou’re In Love" and "John Barleycorn". The set should be a big sales item after the film is shown on TV." Meanwhile, Billboard wrote that the High Tor cast album "is an excellent package of Crosbiana, and if the show is as big a click as expected, the LP should enjoy brisk sales".

== Track listing ==
All lyrics are written by Maxwell Anderson; all music is composed by Arthur Schwartz.

Side one
No.	Title	Performer(s)	Length
1.	"Living One Day at a Time"	Bing Crosby	3:09
2.	"When You're in Love"	Bing Crosby	2:56
3.	"Sad Is the Life of a Sailor's Wife"	Julie Andrews	2:14
4.	"When You're in Love"	Julie Andrews & Everett Sloane	2:58
5.	"A Little Love, A Little While"	Bing Crosby	3:09
6.	"When You're in Love" (reprise)	Everett Sloane	2:22

Side two
No.	Title	Performer(s)	Length
1.	"John Barleycorn"	Bing Crosby	2:34
2.	"Once upon a Long Ago"	Julie Andrews	3:31
3.	"Once upon a Long Ago"	Bing Crosby	2:43
4.	"John Barleycorn"	Bing Crosby and chorus	2:23
5.	"A Little Love, A Little While" (reprise)	Bing Crosby	1:05

== Personnel ==
Credits adapted from the liner notes of High Tor record.

- Arranged by Joseph J. Lilley, Skip Martin
- Score and conducted by Joseph J. Lilley
- Written and produced by Arthur Schwartz
