= High Tor (play) =

1936 play by Maxwell Anderson

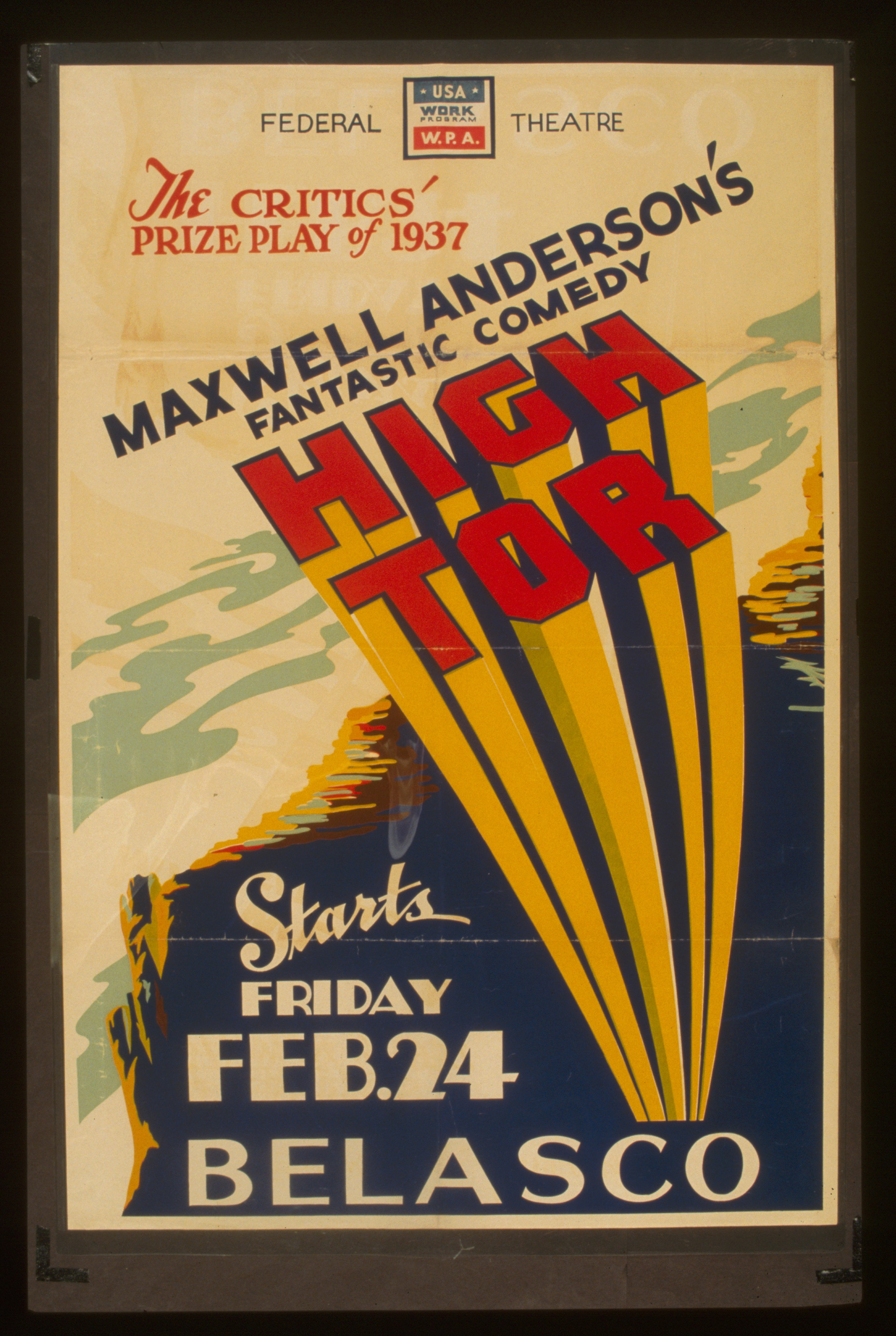
- Poster for Federal Theatre Project presentation of High Tor at the Belasco
- Written by: Maxwell Anderson
- Original language: English
- Genre: Drama
- Setting: sections of High Tor

Premiere
- Date premiered: January 9, 1937
- Place premiered: Martin Beck Theatre; New York City, New York

High Tor is a 1936 play by Maxwell Anderson. It received the New York Drama Critics' Circle Award for Best Play of the 1936–37 season. Twenty years after the original production, Anderson adapted it into a television musical with Arthur Schwartz.

== Play ==
The play is named for a summit overlooking the Tappan Zee portion of New York's Hudson River, near where Anderson lived in Rockland County. The story was inspired by the real life controversy over quarrying the palisades along the lower Hudson. The play also shares the plot element of a ghostly crew of Dutch sailors on the Hudson with Washington Irving's short story Rip Van Winkle.

Anderson began writing the play in May 1936. It was first presented onstage in Cleveland, Ohio, in December 1936, with Burgess Meredith (Anderson's neighbor in Rockland County) and Peggy Ashcroft in the lead roles. Thomas W. Ross was also in the production as Judge Skimmerhorn. The production moved to Broadway ten days later in January 1937, where it played 171 performances.

High Tor received the New York Drama Critics' Circle Award for the Best American play of the 1936–1937 season. The award included this citation:

In its decision the circle celebrates the advent of the first distinguished fantasy by an American in many years. Imaginative and as comic as it is poetic in both spirit and expression, High Tor is a singular accomplishment, giving rare grace to this theatrical season in New York.

In 1942, Anderson helped organize and served as the chairman of the Rockland County Committee To Save High Tor, which helped raise money to purchase the property in 1943 for the creation of a public park.

== Television adaptations ==
The play was broadcast as an episode of The Philco Television Playhouse on NBC, September 10, 1950, with Alfred Ryder and Felicia Monteleagre in the lead roles.

=== Musical ===
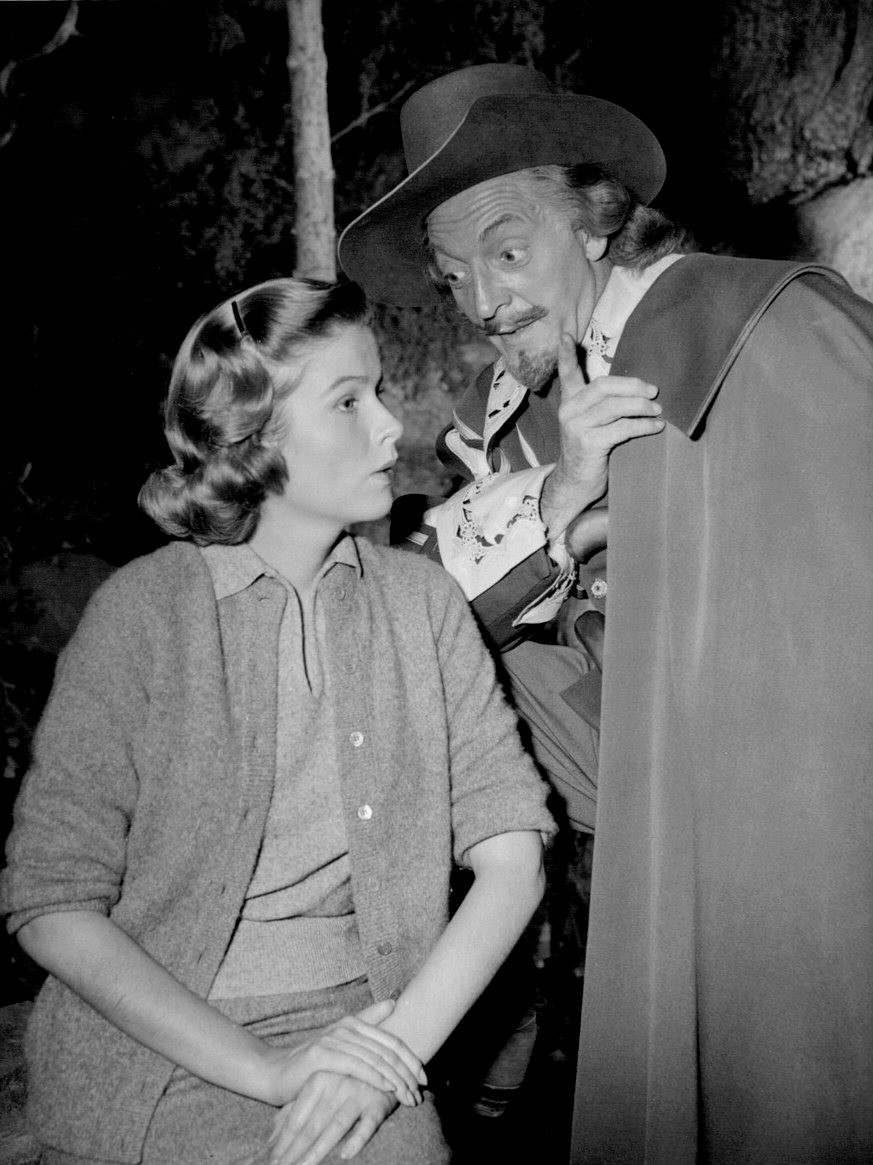
Having lost Van to Lisa, Judith (Nancy Olson) meets the spirit of a sailor (Everett Sloane) who tells her Van will return to her by morning.

Anderson first considered a musical adaptation of High Tor for television in 1949. He and John Monks Jr. adapted the play as a made-for-television musical fantasy in 1955, with music by Arthur Schwartz and lyrics by Anderson. High Tor was filmed in November 1955 by Desilu Productions at the RKO-Pathé Studio. Filming took only 12 days and the show was broadcast March 10, 1956 on the CBS television network, as a 90-minute episode of the series Ford Star Jubilee. Bing Crosby, Julie Andrews, Nancy Olson, Hans Conried, and Everett Sloane starred in the film, produced by Arthur Schwartz, and directed by James Neilson.

Bing Crosby had seen Julie Andrews in her Broadway debut in The Boy Friend, and invited her to appear in High Tor. It was Andrews' first work in a filmed production, and her American television debut. Because Crosby was uncomfortable with the exigencies of live television, he insisted that it be filmed instead. For this reason, High Tor is sometimes considered the first TV movie.

Maxwell Anderson had little interest in television, and considered his adaptation a "potboiling job". Julie Andrews later wrote that she thought her performance was "very stilted", and, "Alas, High Tor was not a memorable piece, and received only lukewarm reviews."

The song score of the show, with story narration by Bing Crosby, was released by Decca Records in 1956.

The young Stephen Sondheim also set a musical version, but the author refused permission, so the musical was never produced. Subsequent copyright extension acts mean the music will be illegal until 2042.

==== Plot of the musical version ====
Van Van Dorn (Crosby) owns a summit ("High Tor") overlooking the Hudson River in New York. Van Dorn is under pressure to sell his real estate, and, at the same time, is having doubts about his impending marriage to Judith (Olson). Judith leaves him because she feels that he should sell High Tor, as the profits would provide for their future. A freak rock slide traps Van Dorn and the real estate agents on High Tor; as Van searches for help, he meets the spirit of a Dutch girl by the name of Lisa (Andrews). Lisa and the spirits of Dutch sailors have inhabited High Tor for over 300 years since they were killed in a shipwreck. Lisa then falls in love with Van. Songs include "Once Upon a Long Ago", a duet for Crosby and Andrews, "Sad is the Life of a Sailor's Wife", a solo for Andrews, and "When You're in Love".

==== Song list ====
- John Barleycorn
- A Little Love, a Little While
- Living One Day at a Time
- Once Upon a Long Ago
- Sad Is the Life of the Sailor's Wife
- When You're in Love

See also High Tor (album)

=== Reception ===
The reviews were not good although the show did achieve a rating of 29.4 against the competition of a Jimmy Durante show (13.7). Daily Variety opined, inter alia: "Somewhere in the double translation - from stage to tv-pix terms and from dramatic to musical comedy form - much of what made ‘High Tor’ a Broadway success seems to have got lost. What emerges on the home screens in this film, said to have cost upwards of $500,000, is essentially, a listless exercise, with rather undistinguished musical and murky philosophising, leavened only by the stingiest pinches of comedy." Jack Gould writing in The New York Times said, "Bing Crosby badly miscast himself in undertaking a filmed musical version of Maxwell Anderson’s fantasy, “High Tor,” presented on Saturday evening over Channel 2. The motion picture, especially made for television use, was embarrassingly awkward and inept, a dismaying “quickie” unworthy of the Old Groaner’s time and talents.

The trade journal Broadcasting-Telecasting gave production costs as “approximately $250,000” and wrote, “If anything was proved [by this production], it was that someone was mistaken in his judgment of what is satisfying entertainment….Maybe the play originally made sense. Saturday’s musical version did not. Its fantasy was all right, and so was its slapstick. Bing Crosby and the cast are all first rate artists. But the ingredients just wouldn’t blend. Music, if there had been more of it, could have carried the senseless action along. But this weird comedy was neither musical nor play. Whatever it was, it was unworthy of Mr. Crosby and colleagues.”

== Radio adaptation ==
High Tor was presented on Lux Summer Theatre June 1, 1953. The one-hour adaptation starred William Holden.
