= Cinderella (Original television cast recording) =

Cast recording by Julie Andrews
- Released: 1 April 1957
- Genre: Show tune
- Label: Columbia Masterworks

Julie Andrews chronology
My Fair Lady (1956)	Cinderella (1957)	Tell It Again (1957)

Cinderella is the original cast recording of the television musical composed by Richard Rodgers with a book and lyrics by Oscar Hammerstein II. The production starred Julie Andrews in the title role and premiered live on CBS on March 31, 1957. The album, produced by Goddard Lieberson for Columbia Records, was recorded earlier that month and released the following day, on April 1, 1957, and includes songs such as "In My Own Little Corner", "Do I Love You Because You’re Beautiful" and "A Lovely Night". It was later reissued on compact disc in 1999 with additional tracks featuring orchestral and piano renditions of selections from the score.

Upon its release, the recording received generally positive critical attention and achieved commercial success. Contemporary reviews praised the cast's polished performances and Julie Andrews' standout vocal interpretation, though some critics argued that the score did not reach the quality of Rodgers and Hammerstein's earlier collaborations. The album nonetheless benefited from the musical's record-breaking television audience and strong promotional campaign, helping it chart on Billboard's Best Selling Pop Albums list, where it peaked at number 15.

== Background, production and release ==
Cinderella is a musical written for television, with music by Richard Rodgers and a book and lyrics by Oscar Hammerstein II. Based on Charles Perrault’s French fairy tale Cendrillon, ou la petite pantoufle de verre (Cinderella, or The Little Glass Slipper), the story follows a young woman forced into servitude by her wicked stepmother after her father's death, who, with the aid of her fairy godmother, is magically transformed into a dazzling beauty, attends a royal ball and finds true love with a prince. It is the only Rodgers and Hammerstein musical created for television. It was first broadcast live in color on CBS on March 31, 1957, starring Julie Andrews in the title role. The broadcast attracted a record-setting audience of over 100 million viewers, making it a landmark event in American television history.

The album features performances of the original cast and was recorded in March 1957, just weeks before the live television broadcast on CBS. Produced by Goddard Lieberson for Columbia Records, the album was released on April 1, 1957, the day after the broadcast. The recording captures the score of the musical, which includes songs such as "In My Own Little Corner", "Do I Love You Because You're Beautiful", and "A Lovely Night".

The recording was part of a broader promotional effort by Rodgers and Hammerstein to ensure the success of the musical's songs. In early March 1957, Julie Andrews recorded six songs from Cinderella for a special promotional disc sent to TV news editors and radio disc jockeys. Additionally, an album featuring covers of four songs from the score by artists like Vic Damone and Peggy King was released four weeks before the broadcast. The 1999 compact disc (CD) reissue of the soundtrack added bonus tracks, including Richard Rodgers playing piano versions of "Mother and Daughter March" and "Waltz for a Ball", and orchestral versions of "In My Own Little Corner" and "A Lovely Night" featuring Andrews.

== Critical reception ==
Professional ratings
Review scores
Source	Rating
AllMusic	4.5/5 stars

Billboard wrote that while Cinderella is not Rodgers and Hammerstein at their best, it still offers good entertainment value. The review highlighted a perceived lack of warmth and charm compared to their earlier collaborations like Oklahoma! and South Pacific. However, the musical's TV exposure, plans for a Broadway run, and the top-notch cast were seen as factors that would contribute to the album's sales potential. The review concluded by acknowledging the attractive cover art, suggesting that the visual appeal might also attract buyers.

AllMusic's review by William Ruhlmann rated the album four and a half out of five stars and emphasized the historical significance of the 1957 broadcast, which attracted the largest TV audience at the time. Ruhlmann praised the typically lovely music and affecting lyrics, which he felt softened some of the harder aspects of the fairy tale. He particularly enjoyed Julie Andrews' performance, describing it as "wonderful". Cash Box magazine echoed the sentiment that Cinderella was a charming production. The review praised the original cast's skillful and polished performance displayed on the TV broadcast. It also predicted that the show's vast video audience would make the album a top-selling item in a short time. The review named "Lovely Night", "In My Own Little Corner", and "Do I Love You Because You're Beautiful" as standout tracks. In a 2014 Playbill article, Ben Rimalower included the album as an essential release from Julie Andrews' discography.

== Commercial performance ==
The album charted for one week on Billboard magazine's Best Selling Pop Albums chart, reaching number 15. The album debuted at the top of Billboard's Pop Albums Coming Up Strong chart on April 27, 1957. This chart, compiled through a survey of major markets, highlighted newer pop albums showing strong trade activity and potential to enter the national best-selling pop albums chart. The album's early success indicated significant commercial interest and strong sales momentum.

By May 27, 1957, the album had also appeared on The Billboard's Monthly Recap of Best Selling Classical and Jazz Packaged Records, specifically in the "Show" category. It secured the 6th position on this chart, reflecting its excellent sales performance and solidifying its status as a successful release in the market.

== Track listing ==
No.	Title	Writer(s)	Performer (s)	Length
1.	"Overture"	Rodgers, Hammerstein	Orchestra	2:55
2.	"In My Own Little Corner"	Rodgers, Hammerstein	Julie Andrews	3:43
3.	"The Prince Is Giving A Ball"	Rodgers, Hammerstein	Robert Penn, Townspeople	2:34
4.	"Royal Dressing Room Scene"	Rodgers, Hammerstein	Dorothy Stickney, Howard Lindsay, Iggie Wolfington, George Hall (8)	1:43
5.	"In My Own Little Corner (Reprise)"	Rodgers, Hammerstein	Julie Andrews	2:34
6.	"Impossible; It's Possible"	Rodgers, Hammerstein	Julie Andrews, Edith Adams	4:15
7.	"Gavotte"	Rodgers, Hammerstein	Orchestra	3:03
8.	"Ten Minutes Ago"	Rodgers, Hammerstein	Julie Andrews, Jon Cypher	2:33
9.	"Stepsister's Lament"	Rodgers, Hammerstein	Kaye Ballard, Alice Ghostley	1:22
10.	"Waltz For A Ball"	Rodgers, Hammerstein	Orchestra, Ensemble	3:44
11.	"Do I Love You Because You're Beautiful"	Rodgers, Hammerstein	Julie Andrews, Jon Cypher	2:50
12.	"When You're Driving Through The Moonlight; A Lovely Night"	Rodgers, Hammerstein	Julie Andrews, Ilka Chase, Kaye Ballard, Alice Ghostley	5:29
13.	"The Search"	Rodgers, Hammerstein	Orchestra	1:18
14.	"The Wedding"	Rodgers, Hammerstein	Orchestra, Ensemble	3:50

== Personnel ==
Credits adapted from the liner notes of Cinderella (Original Television Cast) record.

- Directed by Ralph Nelson
- Lyrics by Oscar Hammerstein II
- Music by Richard Rodgers
- Orchestrated by Robert Russell Bennett
- Producer by Richard Lewine
- Illustration by Balet

== Charts ==
Weekly chart performance for Cinderella
Chart (1957)	Peak position
US Best Selling Pop Albums (Billboard)	15
