= Julie Andrews Sings =

Studio album by Julie Andrews
- Released: 1958
- Genre: Show tune
- Label: RCA Victor

Julie Andrews chronology
The Lass with the Delicate Air (1957)	Julie Andrews Sings (1958)	Rose-Marie (1958)

Julie Andrews Sings is the second solo studio album by English actress and singer Julie Andrews, released in 1958 by RCA Victor. It followed her debut album, The Lass with the Delicate Air (1957), and features a repertoire centered on musical theater works and American popular song.

The album was recorded during a period when Andrews was already established on Broadway, and its selection reflects her association with musicals and the Great American Songbook. It was issued in various formats, including LP and an extended play (EP) with selected tracks, and was later reissued on compact disc (CD) and included in compilation releases.

Although it did not achieve major commercial success, the album received positive reviews from critics.

== Background ==
Following her debut album, The Lass with the Delicate Air (1957), which focused on English folk songs, this release marked a shift toward a repertoire of musical theater classics. The album was recorded during a period when Andrews was gaining prominence for her role as Eliza Doolittle in My Fair Lady on Broadway.

== Album details and release ==
Julie Andrews Sings features compositions by 20th-century songwriters, including Rodgers and Hammerstein, Cole Porter, Irving Berlin, and Noël Coward, among others. With arrangements and conducting by Irwin Kostal, Andrews' performances feature soprano vocals and clear articulation. The track list includes both ballads and theatrical numbers, with material drawn from Broadway and the American Songbook. In addition to the LP, the album was issued the same year on tape and as an EP featuring a selection of songs from the full release.

The album was officially released on compact disc (CD) twice, both as limited editions in Japan, first in mono in 1999 and then in stereo with a paper sleeve in 2002, both by RCA. In 2008, British reissue label Flare Records took advantage of the 50-year copyright limit to release an unauthorized version, which received three and a half stars from AllMusic. The following year, Avid Easy released Julie Andrews: Four Classic Albums, a two-CD compilation featuring four of her albums from the late 1950s (Songs of Sense & Nonsense – Tell It Again (1957), The Lass with the Delicate Air (1957), My Fair Lady (1959) and Julie Andrews Sings). AllMusic's William Ruhlmann rated it three and a half stars, noting that Andrews fans might find this reissue particularly interesting.

Three songs of the album were later included in Andrews' Christmas albums Greatest Christmas Songs (2000): "It Might As Well Be Spring", "Cheek to Cheek" and "Falling in Love with Love". Heather Phares from AllMusic rated this album three out of five stars.

== Promotion ==
In 1966, when the artist was at the peak of her career with her film productions Mary Poppins and The Sound of Music, RCA of Australia declared "May Is Julie Andrews Month" and launched a promotional campaign featuring four albums by the artist: The Lass with the Delicate Air, Rose Marie, The Boy Friend, and Julie Andrews Sings.

== Critical reception ==
Professional ratings
Review scores
Source	Rating
AllMusic	3.5/5 stars
Billboard	3/4 stars

The New York Times wrote: "Miss Andrews is still too much the reserved, though undeniably fair, lady to become convincingly involved in even the less earthy works of Gershwin, Kern, Rodgers and Weill". Cash Box considered that the album (except for songs by Noël Coward and Ivor Novello) "pictures the star in pretty, precisely-phrased vocals".

DownBeat wrote tha Andrews "communicates with a kind of cool charm throughout, restrained and disciplined". Billboard stated "she is charming in sentimental numbers like 'We'll Gather Lilacs' but sounds like a coy British version of Shirley Temple in some of the others". Boys' Life magazine recommended the album in Bob Hood's column "Plater Chatter".

In a retrospective review, William Ruhlmann of AllMusic wrote: "Julie Andrews Sings demonstrated, if there had been any doubt, that Julie Andrews certainly could sing, but it didn't display all the ways she could sing".

== Commercial performance ==
According to Robert Windeler, writer of Julie Andrews — A Biography, Andrews's solo albums released between the late 1950s and early 1960s, like Julie Andrews Sings, did not sell well, which prevented her from making more albums.

== Track listing ==
No.	Title	Writer(s)	Length
1.	"It Might as Well Be Spring"	Oscar Hammerstein II / Richard Rodgers	2:28
2.	"Falling in Love with Love"	Lorenz Hart / R. Rodgers	2:20
3.	"We'll Gather Lilacs"	Ivor Novello	2:50
4.	"He Loves and She Loves"	George Gershwin / Ira Gershwin	2:43
5.	"I'm Old Fashioned"	Jerome Kern / Johnny Mercer	2:31
6.	"You're a Builder-Upper"	Harold Arlen / Ira Gershwin / E.Y. "Yip" Harburg	2:23
7.	"Little Old Lady"	Stanley Adams / Hoagy Carmichael	2:22
8.	"My Ship"	Ira Gershwin / Kurt Weill	2:06
9.	"Cheek to Cheek"	Irving Berlin	1:59
10.	"Come to Me, Bend to Me"	Alan Jay Lerner / Frederick Loewe	2:02
11.	"So in Love"	Cole Porter	2:35
12.	"Matelot"	Noël Coward	3:43

== Personnel ==
Credits adapted from the liner notes of Julie Andrews Sings.

- Arrangements and conducting by Irwin Kostal and his orchestra
- Liner notes by Stanley Green
