= National Board of Review Awards 1933 =

Annual US film awards ceremony

5th National Board of Review Awards

December 29, 1933

The 5th National Board of Review Awards were announced on December 29, 1933.

== Top Ten Films ==
1. Topaze
2. Berkeley Square
3. Cavalcade
4. Little Women
5. Mama Loves Papa
6. The Pied Piper
7. She Done Him Wrong
8. State Fair
9. Three-Cornered Moon
10. Zoo in Budapest

== Top Foreign Films ==
1. Hertha's Erwachen
2. Ivan
3. M
4. Morgenrot
5. Niemandsland
6. Poil de carotte
7. The Private Life of Henry VIII
8. Quatorze Juillet
9. Rome Express
10. The Blood of a Poet

== Winners ==
- Best Film: Topaze
- Best Foreign Film: Hertha's Erwachen
