= Bride for Sale =

1949 film by William D. Russell

- Theatrical release poster
- Directed by: William D. Russell; Fred Fleck (assistant)
- Written by: Bruce Manning; Islin Auster; Story: Joseph Fields; Frederick Kohner
- Produced by: Jack H. Skirball
- Starring: Claudette Colbert; Robert Young; George Brent
- Cinematography: Joseph A. Valentine
- Edited by: Frederic Knudtson
- Music by: Frederick Hollander
- Production company: Crest Productions
- Distributed by: RKO Radio Pictures
- Release date: November 12, 1949
- Running time: 87 minutes
- Country: United States
- Language: English
- Box office: $1.7 million

Bride for Sale is a 1949 American romantic comedy film distributed by RKO Radio Pictures, directed by William D. Russell, and starring Claudette Colbert, Robert Young and George Brent. The music score is by Frederick Hollander.

== Plot ==
Nora Shelley is a tax expert for the accounting company which is led by Paul Martin. She thinks she can find a suitable husband by inspecting their clients' tax documents. Martin finds out and tries to dissuade her from this approach, later enlisting the help of his friend Steve Adams, who tries to woo Shelley.

== Cast ==
- Claudette Colbert as Nora Shelley
- Robert Young as Steve Adams
- George Brent as Paul Martin
- Max Baer as Litka
- Gus Schilling as Timothy
- Charles Arnt as Dobbs
- Mary Bear as Miss Stone
- Ann Tyrrell as Miss Swanson
- Paul Maxey as Gentry
- Burk Symon as Setley
- Archie Twitchell as Officer White (uncredited)
