= Ford Star Jubilee =

American TV anthology series

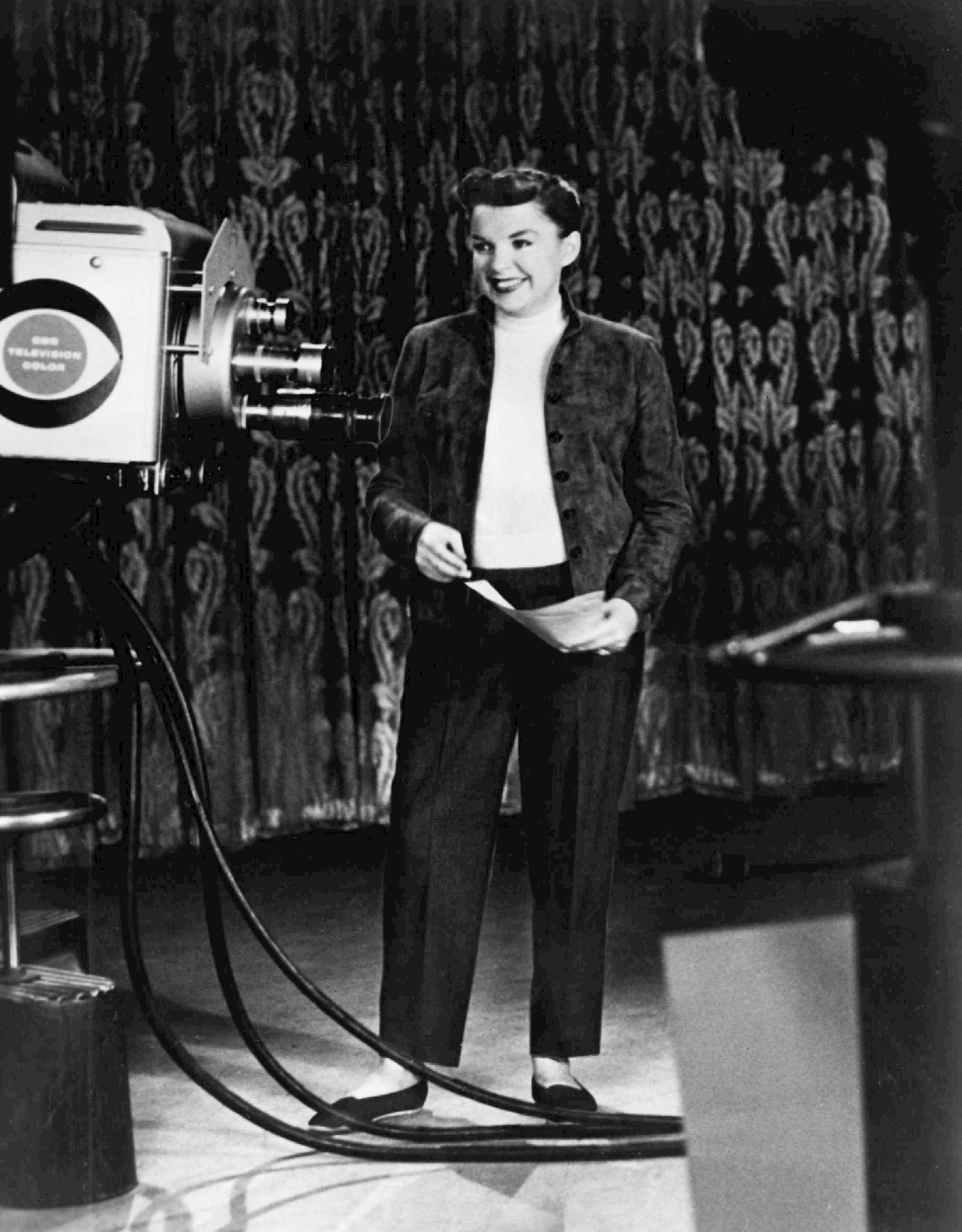
- Judy Garland rehearsing for the program's premiere, September 24, 1955.
- Genre: Anthology
- Written by: Maxwell Anderson; Herbert Baker; Jim Bishop; Robert Buckner; Carroll Carroll; Noël Coward; Paul Gregory; Ben Hecht; John Hersey; Jean Holloway; Charles MacArthur; John Cherry Monks, Jr. Denis Sanders; Terry Sanders; Franklin J. Schaffner; John Tackaberry; Herman Wouk
- Directed by: Seymour Berns; Noël Coward; Frederick de Cordova; Paul Harrison; Delbert Mann; James Neilson; Ralph Nelson; Paul Nickell; Franklin J. Schaffner; Jerome Shaw
- Composer: Frank Denning
- Country of origin: United States
- Original language: English
- No. of seasons: 1
- No. of episodes: 12

Production
- Executive producer: Richard Lewine
- Producers: Robert Alton; Paul Gregory; Lance Hamilton; Sidney Luft; Ken Murray; Jack Rayal; Charles Russell; Arthur Schwartz
- Running time: 90 mins. (approx)

Original release
- Network: CBS
- Release: September 24, 1955 – November 3, 1956

Ford Star Jubilee is an American anthology series that originally aired monthly on Saturday nights on CBS at 9:30 P.M., E.S.T. from September 24, 1955, to November 3, 1956, (With a summer hiatus). The series was approximately 90 minutes long, broadcast in black-and-white and color, and was typically telecast live. Ford Star Jubilee was sponsored by the Ford Motor Company.

== Format ==
Ford Star Jubilee routinely featured major stars, such as Judy Garland, Betty Grable, Debbie Reynolds, Shirley Jones, Orson Welles, Julie Andrews (at the time that she was preparing for her starring role in My Fair Lady on Broadway), Louis Armstrong, Bing Crosby, Gordon MacRae, Lillian Gish, Charles Laughton, Jack Lemmon, Raymond Massey, Lauren Bacall, Claudette Colbert, Noël Coward, Nat 'King' Cole, Mary Martin, Eddie Fisher, Ella Fitzgerald, and Red Skelton.

Instead of the usual live performance staged especially for Ford Star Jubilee, the final episode on November 3, 1956 was a special, two-hour presentation of the 1939 MGM theatrical Technicolor film The Wizard of Oz, hosted by Bert Lahr, 10-year-old Liza Minnelli and young Oz expert Justin Schiller. This marked the first time that the film had ever been shown on television, and the only time that one of the film's actual actors (Lahr) as well as one of the children of the film's star (Judy Garland) hosted it. The broadcast was a ratings smash with a Nielsen rating of 33.9 and an audience share of 53%. In contrast, the presentation of "This Happy Breed" had a rating of 13.6.

Another rare instance of Ford Star Jubilee presenting a filmed, rather than live, program was their 1956 musical version of Maxwell Anderson's High Tor, starring Bing Crosby and Julie Andrews. Music was by Arthur Schwartz, composer of such scores as those for The Band Wagon and Revenge with Music. Crosby, according to sources, had insisted the production be filmed rather than presented live, because he did not feel comfortable acting in a live television musical play. Although it was filmed in color, the musical version of High Tor has never been released on VHS or DVD.

Executives at Ford and their counterparts at CBS sometimes had "major differences on the type of shows most suitable for 'Jubilee'." The series ended when they were unable to agree on what would be presented on Dec. 1, 1956, making The Wizard of Oz the last episode.

Robert McNamara, who was president of Ford Motor Company at the time, was concerned about overall low ratings for the program, writing that they had "lowered the productivity of Ford Star Jubilee to a point where it is difficult to defend on a budgetary basis". He added, "a half-hour of prime time on CBS, correctly programmed, would serve our advertising objectives better than Ford Star Jubilee over the long pull." After Ford Star Jubilee ended, the company became a co-sponsor of Dick Powell's Zane Grey Theatre.

== Production ==
The series's executive producer was Jack Rayel. Arthur Schwartz was a producer. Directors of episodes included Paul Harris, Paul Nickell and Franklin Schaffner.

== Critical response ==
=== "I Hear America Singing" ===
Critic Jack Gould, writing in The New York Times, praised Reynolds's "vitality and youthful charm" in "I Hear America Singing", and he complimented the singing of Cole and the dance numbers led by Bobby Van. In contrast, he wrote that Fisher "seemed just a shade lonesome and forlorn", Fitzgerald's singing was backed by a too-loud orchestra, and one of Skelton's skits was "not very funny", while andother had an ending that was "in truly abominable taste."

=== "Blithe Spirit" ===
After "Blithe Spirit" was broadcast, Time magazine said, "Viewers last week were treated to the raciest—and most profane—language that has ever been heard on TV." The review said that Coward "acted with silky efficiency" and noted Mildred Natwick's "comic zest" in a supporting role. However, it said that Colbert and Lauren Bacall looked better than they acted, adding that Bacall "seemed uneasy when reciting the litany of her infidelities". Overall, the review said, "The show itself was one of the highlights of a drama-studded week."

=== "A Bell for Adano" ===
Gould said that the decision to present a musical version of "A Bell for Adano" was "an unfortunate error in judgment." Four musical selections that were inserted into the play "merely compromised and diluted it", he said. He also questioned the reduction of Joppolo's part and the expansion of Tina's part that resulted from the addition of musical components, while "Sergeant Borth was reduced practically to a walk-on and the townspeople of Adano to mere gesticulating caricatures of Italians."

=== "You're the Top" ===
Time described the show's tribute to Cole Porter's work as "breezy, beautiful" and "radiant". It commended the episode's choreography and singled out Dorothy Dandridge's "You Do Something to Me" and Dolores Gray's and George Sanders's performance of "Let's Do It" as the top numbers on the program.

== Episodes ==
No.	Title	Original release date
1	"The Judy Garland Special"	September 24, 1955
2	"Together With Music"	October 22, 1955
3	"The Caine Mutiny Court-Martial"	November 19, 1955
4	"I Hear America Singing"	December 17, 1955
5	"Blithe Spirit"	January 14, 1956
6	"The Day Lincoln Was Shot"	February 11, 1956
7	"High Tor"	March 10, 1956
8	"Twentieth Century"	April 7, 1956
9	"This Happy Breed"	May 5, 1956
10	"A Bell For Adano"	June 2, 1956
11	"You're the Top"	October 6, 1956
12	"The Wizard of Oz"	November 3, 1956

== Awards and nominations ==
Year	Award	Result	Category	Recipient
1956	Primetime Emmy Award	Nominated	Best Variety Series	-
1956	Primetime Emmy Award	Nominated	Best Single Program of the Year	-
1956	Primetime Emmy Award	Nominated	Best Musical Contribution	Mary Martin and Noël Coward (For the song "Camarata" in the episode "Together with Music")
1956	Primetime Emmy Award	Nominated	Best Actor - Single Performance	Barry Sullivan (For the role of Defense Attorney Greenwald in "The Caine Mutiny Court-Martial" episode)
1956	Primetime Emmy Award	Won	Best Television Adaptation	Paul Gregory and Franklin J. Schaffner (For "The Caine Mutiny Court-Martial" episode)
1956	Primetime Emmy Award	Won	Best Director - Live Series	Franklin J. Schaffner (For "The Caine Mutiny Court-Martial" episode)
1956	Primetime Emmy Award	Won	Best Actor - Single Performance	Lloyd Nolan (For the role of Capt. Queeg in "The Caine Mutiny Court-Martial" episode)
