= Claudette Colbert =

French and American actress (1903–1996)

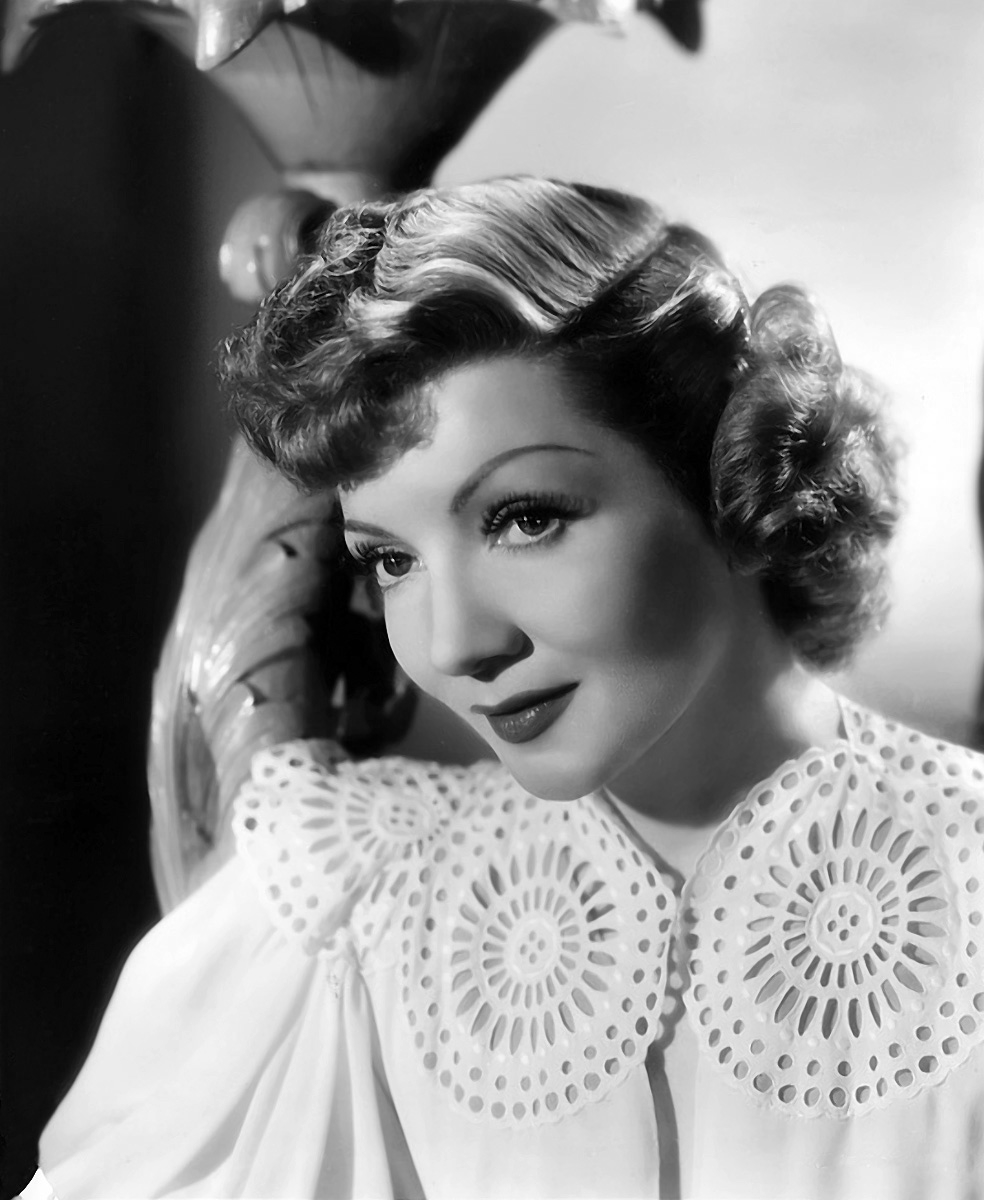
- Colbert in 1944
- Born: Émilie Claudette Chauchoin; September 13, 1903; Saint-Mandé, France
- Died: July 30, 1996 (aged 92); Speightstown, Barbados
- Other name: Lily Claudette Chauchoin
- Education: Art Students League of New York
- Occupation: Actress
- Years active: 1923–1987
- Political party: Republican
- Spouses: Norman Foster (m. 1928; div. 1935) Joel Pressman (m. 1935; died 1968)
- Awards: See below

Claudette Colbert (/koʊlˈbɛər/ kohl-BAIR, French: [klodɛt kɔlbɛʁ]; September 13, 1903 – July 30, 1996), also known as Lily Claudette Chauchoin (French: [ʃoʃwɛ̃]), was an American stage and film actress born in France. She began her career in earnest on Broadway during the late 1920s and progressed to films with the advent of talking pictures. Initially associated with Paramount Pictures, Colbert had a string of successes as she gradually shifted to working as a freelance actress.

With her Mid-Atlantic accent, versatility, stoic character, aristocratic demeanor, and flair for light comedy and emotional drama, Colbert became one of the popular stars of the 1930s and 1940s. In all, she was cast in more than 60 movies, in most of which she had top billing. Among her frequent co-stars were Fred MacMurray in seven films (1935–1949), and Fredric March in four (1930–1933).

Colbert won the Academy Award for Best Actress for It Happened One Night (1934), and earned two other Oscar nominations, for Private Worlds (1935) and Since You Went Away (1944). She starred in two Cecil B. DeMille epics, The Sign of the Cross (1932) and Cleopatra (1934), and her other especially notable films include Imitation of Life (1934), Midnight (1939) and The Palm Beach Story (1942).

By the mid-1950s Colbert had turned from motion pictures to television and stage work; she earned a Tony Award nomination for The Marriage-Go-Round in 1959. Her career began to wane in the early 1960s. In the mid-1970s she experienced a resurgence in the theater, and received a Sarah Siddons Award for her Chicago theater work in 1980. Her television appearance in The Two Mrs. Grenvilles (1987) earned her a Golden Globe Award and an Emmy nomination. In 1999, Colbert was named the 12th-greatest female star of classic Hollywood cinema by the American Film Institute.

== Early life ==
Émilie "Lily" Claudette Chauchoin was born in 1903 in Saint-Mandé, France, to Jeanne (née Loew), of British Channel Islands heritage, and Georges Chauchoin. Although christened "Émilie", she was called "Lily" after the famous Jersey-born actress Lillie Langtry. Her mother had intended to name her daughter Lily, but the pastor mistakenly chose the baptismal name Émilie, so she was always called Lily in the family. Colbert's brother, Charles, was born in the Bailiwick of Jersey in 1898. Georges owned and managed a chain store of pastry and bonbon shops (more than eleven), and was also a major stockholder of an ink factory in which he suffered business setbacks. Colbert's uncle was living in New York City.

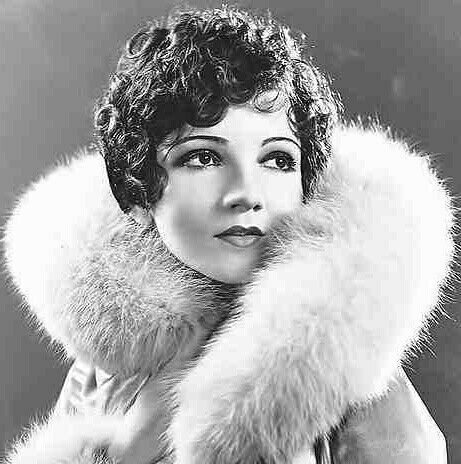
During her high school days, 1920

After some financial reverses, Colbert and her family, including her grandmother and her aunt, immigrated to Manhattan in 1906. Colbert's legal name is formally registered in the U.S. as Lily Claudette Chauchoin. They lived in a fifth-floor walk-up at 53rd Street. Colbert later stated that she was always climbing those stairs until the age of 18. Georges worked as a minor official in the foreign department at First National City Bank, and each member of the family was later naturalized as a U.S. citizen. Colbert grew up bilingual, being a native French speaker but having learnt Channel Island English from her grandmother before she entered public school. She had hoped to become a painter ever since she first gripped a pencil. Colbert's mother was an opera music fan, who had an excellent singing voice, and her aunt was a dressmaker. Inspired by the latter, Colbert began sketching people's fashion designs.

Colbert studied at Washington Irving High School, which was known for its strong arts program. Her speech teacher, Alice Rostetter, encouraged her to audition for a play Rostetter had written. In 1921, at the age of 17, Colbert made her stage debut at the Provincetown Playhouse in revivals of Rostetter's The Widow's Veil and Aria da Capo by Edna St. Vincent Millay. Her interests, though, still leaned towards painting, fashion design, and commercial art.

Intending to become a fashion designer, she attended the Art Students League of New York, where she paid for her art education by working in a dress shop. After attending a party with writer Anne Morrison, Colbert was offered a bit part in Morrison's play, and appeared on the Broadway stage in a small role in The Wild Westcotts (1923). She had used the name Claudette, instead of Lily, since high school; for her stage name, she added the maiden name (Colbert) of her father's grandmother, after her brother used the surname Wendling, borrowed from their maternal grandmother's maiden name. Her father died in 1925.

== Career ==
=== Beginnings, 1923–1928 ===
Between 1923 and 1927, Colbert joined a stock company, managed by Jessie Bonstelle, and worked in a string of mostly short-lived shows in regional theaters such as those in Chicago, Washington, D.C., Boston and Connecticut in plays such as Leah Kleschna, We've Got to Have Money, The Cat Came Back, High Stakes, and The Marionette Man which enabled her to gain experience in different genres. In 1924 the English actor Leslie Howard met her, was impressed by her ability to speak with both Mid-Atlantic and British accents, and contacted the producer Al Woods to cast her in Frederick Lonsdale's The Fake, but she was replaced by Frieda Inescort before it opened. After signing a five-year contract with Woods, Colbert performed in eleven Broadway productions from 1925 to 1929, while still belonging to a stock company until 1927. During this period she rejected being typecast such as a French maid, earning a reputation from critics for being composed and impressive.

By 1925 she was having success in the comedy A Kiss in a Taxi, which ran for 103 performances over a two-month period. Columnists sang the praises of her unconventional beauty and her power to enrapture an audience. Colbert was again acclaimed for The Ghost Train (1926, thriller) and The Pearl of Great Price (also 1926). The following year, The Barker (as a carnival snake charmer) ran for 221 performances on Broadway, and she reprised the role in London's West End.

She was noticed by theatrical producer Leland Hayward, who suggested her for the heroine role in the silent film For the Love of Mike (1927), directed by Frank Capra. Now believed to be lost, the film did not fare well at the box office. After that, she continued to appear on the stage, in several plays such as Fast Life (1928) and Eugene O’Neill's Dynamo (1929).

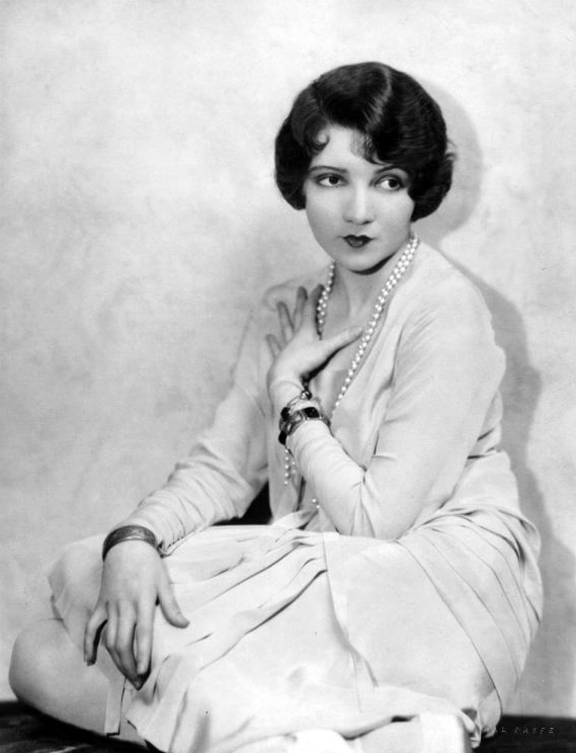
Colbert in the Broadway production La Gringa, 1928

In 1928, Colbert signed a contract with Paramount Pictures. A demand existed for stage actors who could handle dialogue in the new "talkies", and Colbert's elegance and musical voice were among her best assets.

=== Early films, 1929–1934 ===
Her distinctive high-cheekboned beauty drew attention in The Hole in the Wall (1929), but at first she did not like film acting. Her co-star Edward G. Robinson later said, "She was one grand trouper—a pro all the way". Her earliest films were produced in New York. During appearing nightly in the play See Naples and Die on the stage, she was also the filming of The Lady Lies (also 1929). The film was a box-office success.

Her acting looks much more natural in these films than her later ones. By then, her acting style was recognized as the "Claudette Colbert manner". At this period, many film critics wrote her having potential to be the screen's next big star. When the Great Depression shut down most of the theaters, she decided to make other films. In 1930, Colbert starred opposite Maurice Chevalier in The Big Pond, which was a high-quality musical film that featured their songs. She co-starred with her first husband, Norman Foster, in Young Man of Manhattan (1930). However, he received negative reviews as one of her weakest leading men. She was cast in a critically acclaimed crime drama Manslaughter (1930, co-starring Fredric March), which remained screenwriter-director George Abbott's favorite of his own films.

Those previous works had established her position within the studio system that dominated American filmmaking. Colbert starred in Mysterious Mr. Parkes (1930), a French-language version of Slightly Scarlet for the European market. It was also screened in the United States. She was paired with March again in Dorothy Arzner's romantic drama Honor Among Lovers (1931), which was well-received by the public. She sang and played piano/violin in Ernst Lubitsch musical The Smiling Lieutenant (1931), which was nominated for the Academy Award for Best Picture as well as being a box-office hit and critical success. March was also originally cast as her co-star in His Woman (1931), but was replaced by Gary Cooper. Cooper felt that her acting skills was so far greater than his own.

For the next few years, she portrayed typically the bright women with witty dialogues, in such pictures as Secrets of a Secretary (1931, opposite Herbert Marshall), The Wiser Sex (1932, opposite Melvyn Douglas), and Misleading Lady (1932). Marshall and Douglas each co-starred with her three different films by the late 1930s. Douglas later said, "Claudette worked for the good of the whole (filmmaking) and it showed in the result (quality)."

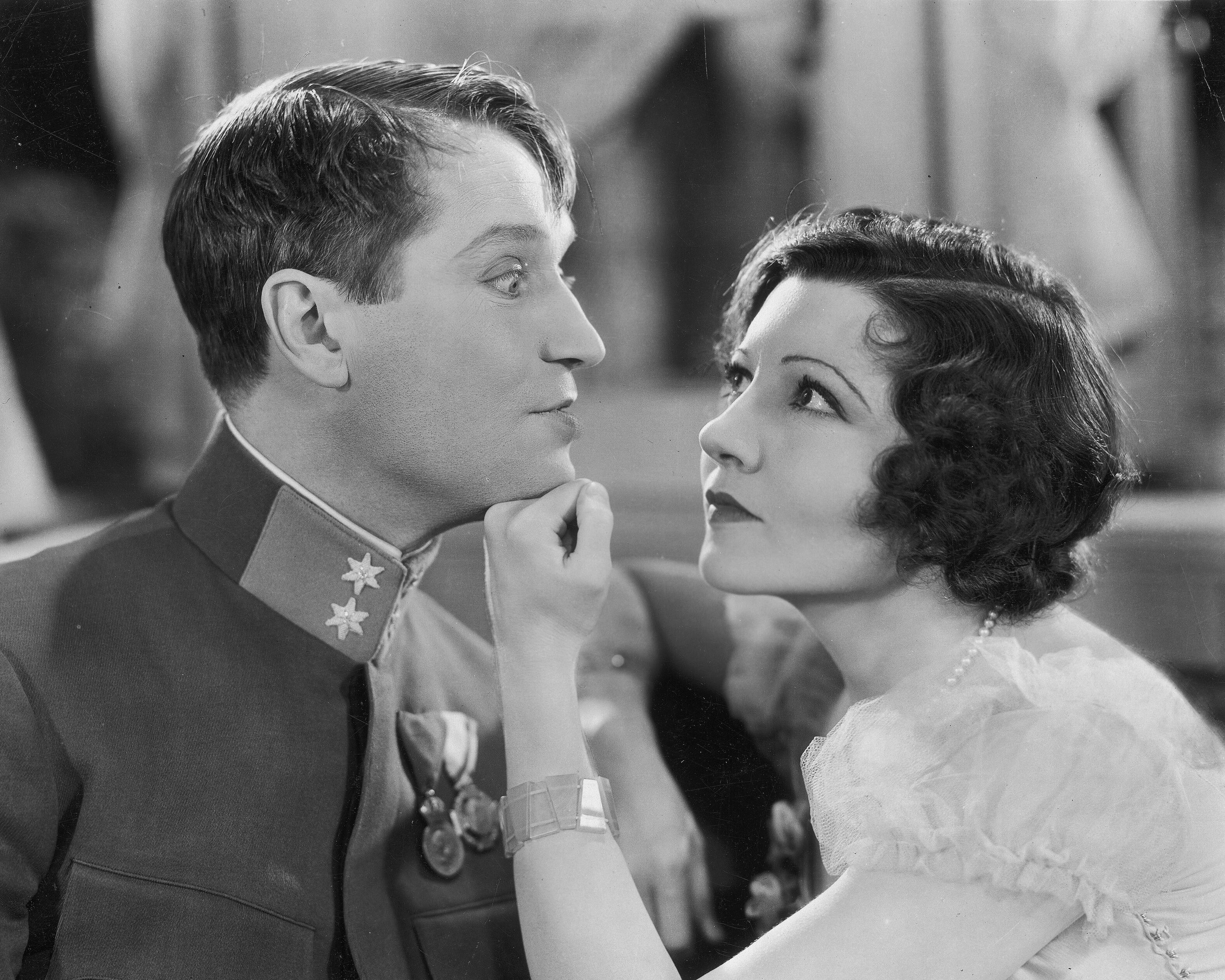
With Maurice Chevalier in The Smiling Lieutenant (1931)

In 1932, she was cast in the wartime drama The Man from Yesterday and the musical comedy film The Phantom President. The latter featured a famous entertainer George M. Cohan, with songs written by Rodgers and Hart. Colbert's career got a further boost when she had the supporting role as the Roman empress Poppaea in Cecil B. DeMille's historical epic The Sign of the Cross (1932), opposite Fredric March and Charles Laughton. In one of the best-remembered scenes of her film career, she bathes nude in a marble pool filled with asses' milk. The film was the highest-grossing picture of the year in the United States. The success of this film is what saved Paramount studios from bankruptcy.

Colbert appeared with March for the fourth and final time in Tonight Is Ours (1933). Around that time, she renegotiated her contract with Paramount to allow her to appear in films for other studios. I Cover the Waterfront (1933), based on a then-bestselling novel, was one of the highlights of her early career. Her co-star Ben Lyon later reminisced, "She was a delight to work with—always professional and inventive". Three-Cornered Moon, a pioneering screwball comedy film, reached No. 9 in the National Board of Review Awards in 1933. Her musical voice, a contralto that footnotes list as being coached by Bing Crosby, was also featured in Torch Singer (1933), co-starring Ricardo Cortez and David Manners. Consequently, she was ranked as the year's 13th box-office star. By 1933, she had appeared in 21 films, averaging three per year. She then went on to do an adventure film Four Frightened People (1934). Many of her early films were dramas, with her performances being admired. Her leading roles were down-to-earth and diverse, highlighting her versatility.

Colbert was initially reluctant to appear in the screwball comedy It Happened One Night (1934). She accepted only after Columbia Pictures agreed to pay her $50,000, double her usual salary at the time, and guaranteed filming would be done within four weeks so she could take a planned vacation. The film was the 4th-highest-grossing picture of the year in the U.S. and topped the National Board of Review's list, earning an Academy Award for Best Picture. For her role in it, Colbert won a Best Actress Oscar. The success of this film is what saved Columbia studios from bankruptcy.

In Cleopatra (1934), Colbert took the title role opposite Warren William and Henry Wilcoxon. It was the second highest-grossing picture of that year in the United States. Thereafter, Colbert did not wish to be portrayed as overtly sexual and refused such roles. On loan to Universal Pictures for a one-picture deal, she was cast in John M. Stahl's notable melodrama Imitation of Life (1934), which was another box-office success. Those two films also earned Best Picture Oscar nominations in the following year; Colbert is the only actress to date to star in three films nominated for Best Picture in a single year.

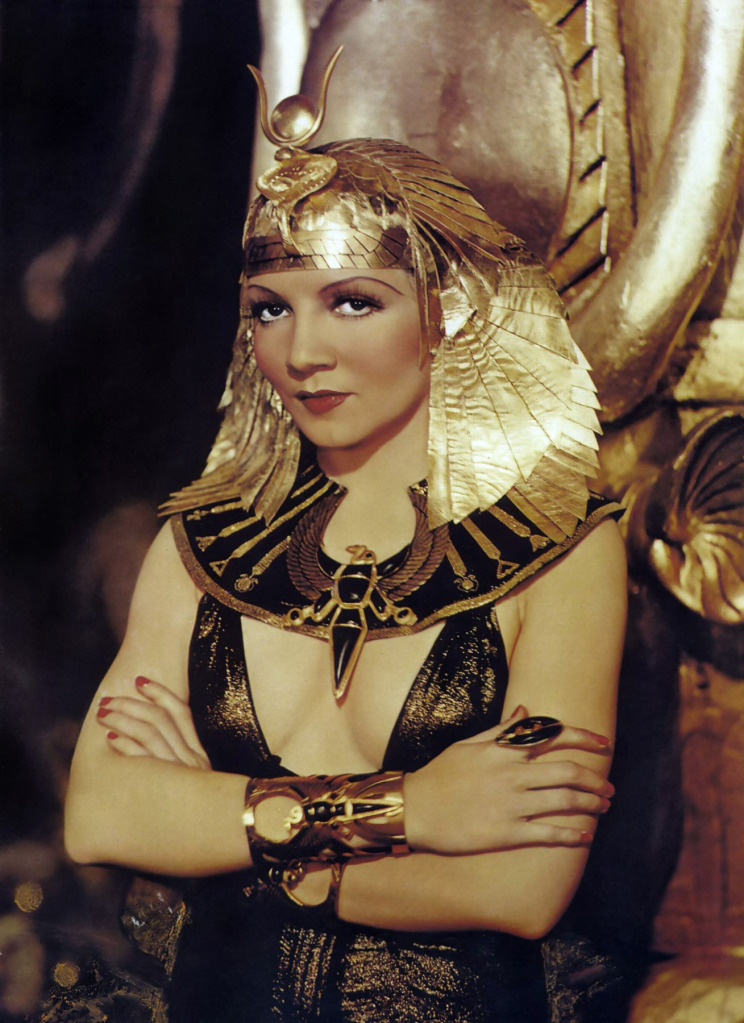
Colbert in the title role of Cleopatra, 1934

=== Mid-career, 1935–1944 ===
Colbert's rising profile internationally allowed her to renegotiate her contract, which raised her salary. For 1935 and 1936, she was listed sixth and eighth in Quigley's annual "Top-Ten Money-Making Stars Poll".

The Gilded Lily (directed by Wesley Ruggles) was popular, which was ranked the fifth best English language film by the National Board of Review in 1935. That success carried over to both films, She Married Her Boss (1935) and The Bride Comes Home (1935). But she earned a Best Actress Oscar nomination for her role in Gregory La Cava's pioneering psychological drama Private Worlds (1935). She starred in Frank Lloyd's adventure film Under Two Flags (1936, featuring Ronald Colman), which also brought her success at the box-office.

In 1936, Colbert signed a new contract with Paramount, making her Hollywood's highest-paid actress. When the studio renewed her contract in 1938, she was again reported to be Hollywood's top-paid actress, with a salary of $426,924. At the peak of her popularity in the late 1930s, she earned $150,000 per film. In 1935, she was elected best-dressed film actress in the U.S.. In 1937 and 1938, she was listed as the fourteenth and sixth (respectively) top money-making woman in the U.S..

Since it hit television in 1960, the historical drama Maid of Salem (1937) enhanced the esteem. However, at that period, her representative works were those modern comedies, I Met Him in Paris (1937, as a winter sports enthusiast) and Bluebeard's Eighth Wife (1938). One of her co-stars later reminisced, "She knew how to project, how to use her voice and posture and general look to highlight her best features."

Despite her slight build at a modest height, compared to the average woman of that era, she never went on a diet. Her favorite song was Cole Porter's Night and Day (1932). Her early frequent co-star Fredric March later said, "she was a wonderfully intelligent conversationalist, a really brainy woman." She had a discreet and scandal-free life, and was recognized as the least "actressy" of actresses. One biographer wrote that her on-screen image reflected her private character. In later life, she told, “Actually, I’ve always believed that acting is instinct to start with. You either have it or you don’t. I’m not sure that going to (drama) school can make you a good actor.”

Colbert was very particular about how she appeared on-screen, and believed her face was difficult to light and photograph. She insisted on having the right side of her face away from the camera when shooting close-ups, because of a small bump from a broken nose as a child. This sometimes required movie sets to be redesigned. During the filming of Tovarich (1937), director Anatole Litvak favored Charles Boyer over Colbert in terms of camera work, leaving her deeply frustrated.

Colbert spent the rest of the 1930s deftly alternating between romantic comedies and dramas: George Cukor's Zaza (1938, as a music-hall singer) with Herbert Marshall; and It's a Wonderful World (1939) with James Stewart. From 1934 to 1939, she had appeared in 17 films, averaging more than 2.5 per year.

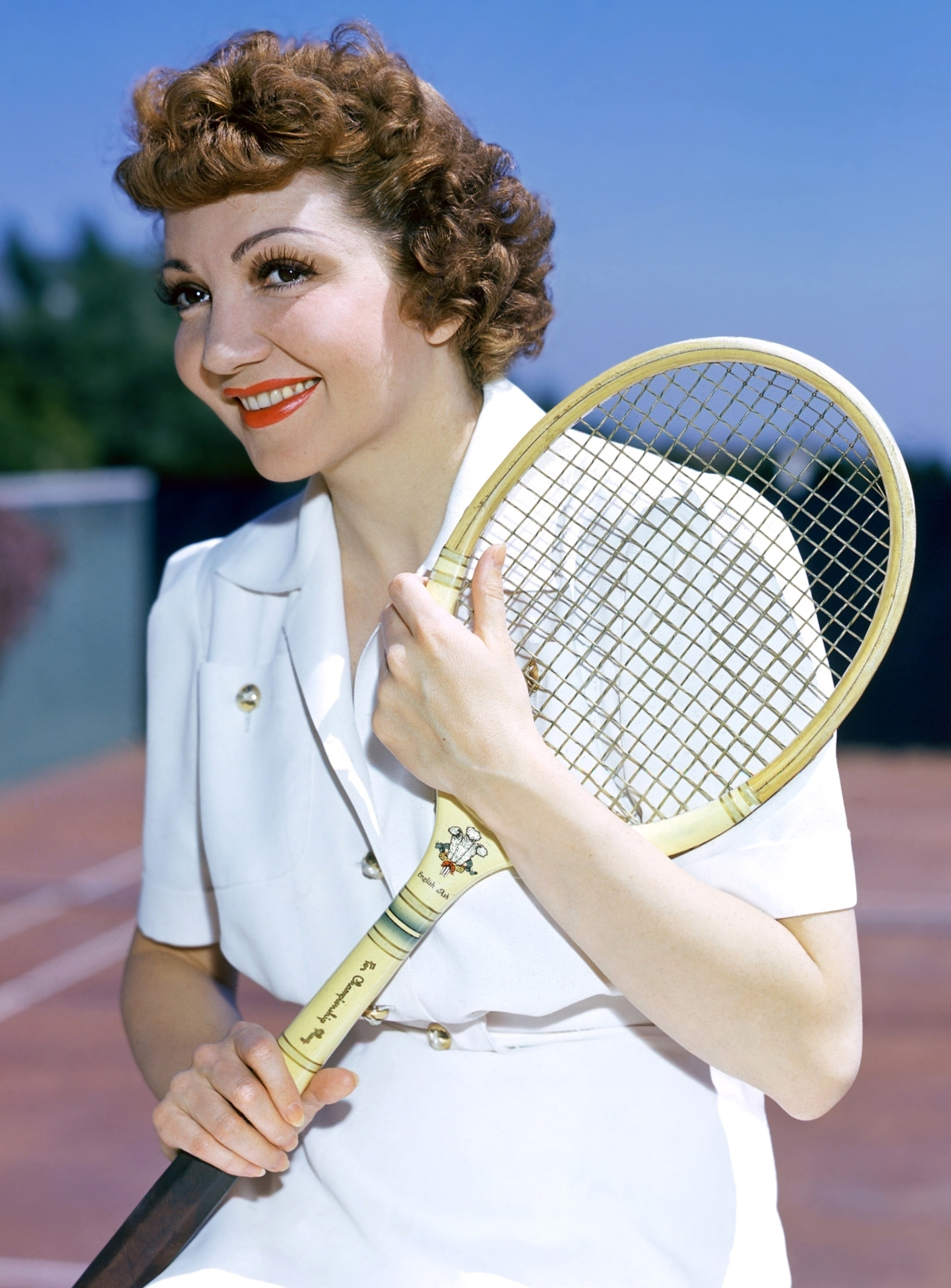
circa early 1940s

Midnight (1939) with Don Ameche, directed by Mitchell Leisen and written by Billy Wilder and Charles Brackett, was one of her best comedy films. Ernst Lubitsch and Mitchell Leisen were her particularly favorite film directors working with. Colbert preferred a lighthearted, gentle directing style that would inspire spontaneous and inventive acting. She once said, "I know what's best for me—after all", but otherwise offered acting advice to her less experienced co-stars from early in her film career.

Colbert learned about lighting and cinematography and refused to begin filming until she was satisfied that she would be shown to her best advantage. John Ford's Drums Along the Mohawk (1939, with Henry Fonda) was her first color film, which was the 10th-grossing picture of the year in the United States. However, she mistrusted the relatively new Technicolor process, and fearing she would not photograph well, preferred thereafter to be filmed in black-and-white. She also exercised strict control over her makeup, hairdo and wardrobe. She once said, “It matters more what’s in a woman’s face than what’s on it.”

During this time, she began performing on CBS's popular radio program Lux Radio Theater, and was heard in 22 episodes between 1935 and 1954. She also participated in 13 episodes of radio's The Screen Guild Theater, between 1939 and 1952. From 1929 to 1950, she was selected for the Photoplay Award for Best Performances of the Month, in 30 films.

In 1940, Colbert was offered a seven-year contract with Paramount Pictures that would have paid her $200,000 a year; she declined the offer after learning she could command $150,000 per film as a freelance artist. She secured roles in several prestigious films and this period marked the height of her earning power.

Colbert played a supporting role in Boom Town (1940, featuring Clark Gable and Spencer Tracy), released by MGM, and which was the highest-grossing picture of the year in the United States. However, she said that Arise, My Love (1940) was her favorite of all her movies. It won the Academy Award for Best Story, which reflected well on her credibility with industry financiers.

The following year, two films, light comedy Skylark and Henry King's Remember the Day (her portrayal of a schoolteacher), kept her busy. The former earned a Best Sound Recording Oscar nomination. Fifteen her movies received at least one Oscar nomination in any category from 1930 to 1947.

Preston Sturges' The Palm Beach Story (1942) has gained some re-evaluation over the years as a comedic classic, in which she gave one of the best performances of her film career, showcasing mature beauty that speaks of intelligence. She again became the industry's highest-paid star in 1942. In the following year, No Time for Love was also popular with audiences.

So Proudly We Hail! (1943) was a well-received war drama, in which her performance was less overstated and more effective, no matter how much the film centers her. Impressed by her role in the film, producer David O. Selznick approached her to play the lead in Since You Went Away (1944). She was initially reluctant to appear as a mother of teenaged children, but he eventually convinced her to take the role. The epic drama film, led by John Cromwell's sensitively dynamic direction, made almost $5 million at the US box office and was the year's third highest-grossing picture, earning an Academy Award nomination for Best Picture. She received a Best Actress Oscar nomination for her performance.

Later that year she appeared in the lighthearted Practically Yours alongside Fred MacMurray, with whom she formed a marketable team in a number of films for nearly a decade up to that point. He said, "I learnt more from her about screen acting than I have ever picked up since."

During World War II, she also volunteered with the Red Cross, and sold war bonds while her husband served as a Navy lieutenant.

=== Middle years, 1945–1961 ===
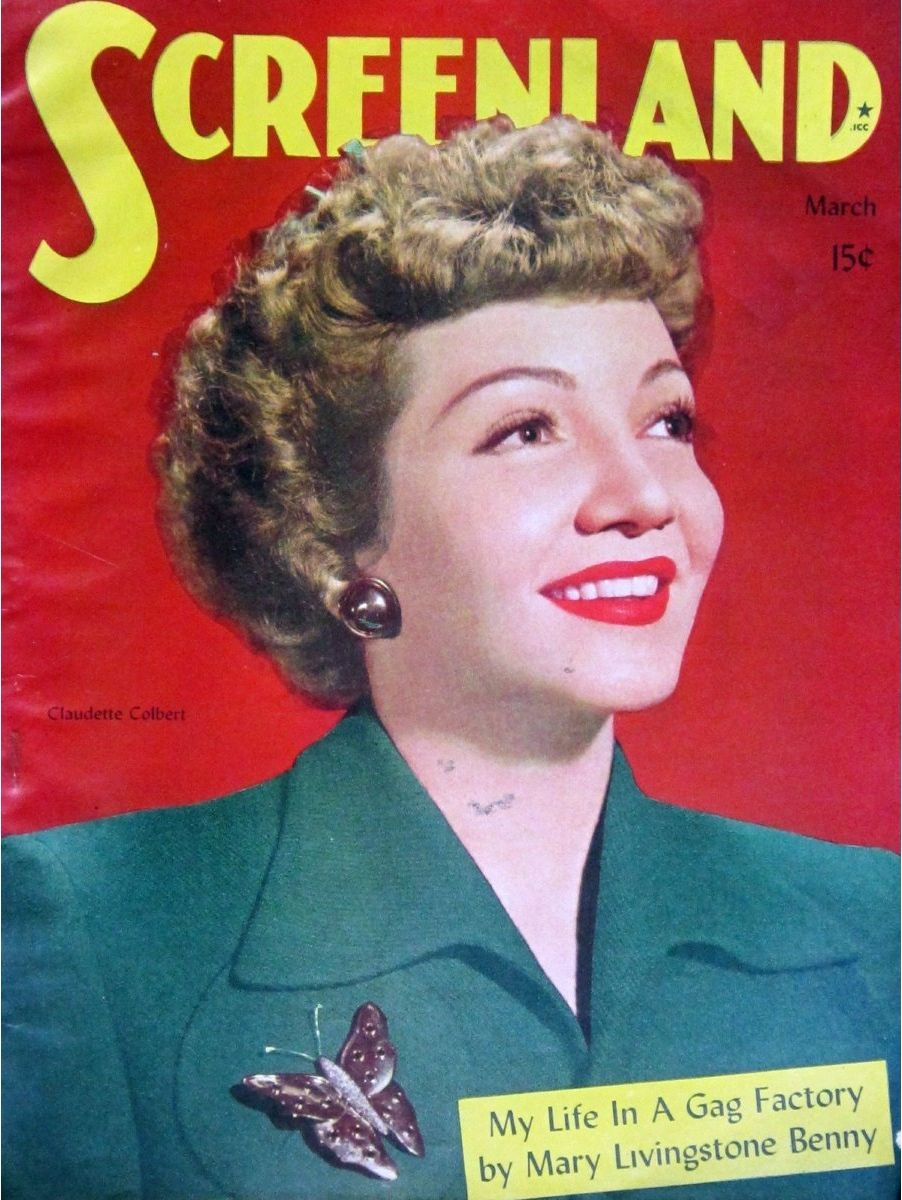
Colbert on Screenland cover before release of Guest Wife (1945)

In 1945, Colbert ended her association with Paramount and continued to freelance in such films as Sam Wood's Guest Wife (1945) with Don Ameche. The film earned a Best Music Oscar nomination. She starred opposite John Wayne in RKO's Without Reservations (1946), which grossed $3 million in the U.S. While working on it, director Mervyn LeRoy described Colbert as an "interesting" lady to work with, recalling her habit of not watching where she was going and constantly bumping into things.

That year, Tomorrow Is Forever was one of the best dramatic performances of her film career, and it was her second husband's favorite. For a psychological drama The Secret Heart (1946), her co-star June Allyson later wrote, Colbert "gave me the moral support and acting tips that made a world of difference." These two films were also substantial commercial successes, and Colbert's popularity during 1947 led her to place 9th in Quigley's "Top Ten Money-Making Stars Poll". One critic praised her at the time for "her consistently excellent playing in mediocre pictures".

She achieved great success opposite MacMurray in the comedy The Egg and I (1947), which was the year's second-highest grossing picture, and later acknowledged as the 12th-most profitable American film of the 1940s. Next came Douglas Sirk's suspense film Sleep, My Love (1948, with Robert Cummings), produced by Mary Pickford. By 1949, she still ranked as the 22nd-highest box-office star.

Colbert appeared with MacMurray for the seventh and final time in Family Honeymoon (1949), which was a commercial hit. Bride for Sale (1949), in which she played part of a love triangle that included Robert Young and George Brent, was well-reviewed and modestly successful. Three Came Home (1950) was also a successful Pacific war film, and brought her to win the Laurel Awards for Best Dramatic Performance (Female). For which, she was nominated for the Photoplay Award for Most Popular Female Star. However, the mystery melodrama The Secret Fury (1950), distributed by RKO Studios, received mixed reviews. During this period, Colbert was unable to work beyond 5 p.m. each day due to orders from her doctor. While Colbert still looked like a young woman, she found it difficult making the transition to playing more mature characters as she entered middle age. She said, "I'm a very good comedienne, but I was always fighting that image, too."

Colbert severely injured her back, which cost her the lead role in All About Eve (1950), and a recurrence of the injury after that killed the other movie she was planning to direct. In later life, Colbert said, "I just never had the luck to play bitches."

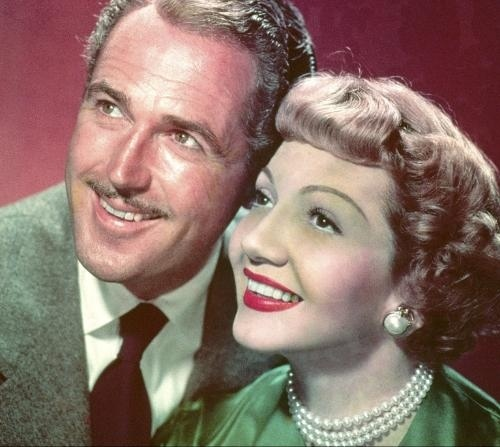
Patric Knowles and Colbert in Three Came Home, 1950

Apart from making two more Hollywood movies (Thunder on the Hill and Let's Make It Legal), in 1951 Colbert went on to guest-star on the TV show The Jack Benny Program, and starred in a successful stage production of Noël Coward's Island Fling in Connecticut. From 1940 to 1951, she had appeared in 21 films, averaging more than 1.5 per year.

From 1952 to 1954, she worked mostly in Europe for tax purposes, and made fewer films. The Planter's Wife (1952) was a big success in the British market. She then did two French films, Daughters of Destiny (1954, segment "Elizabeth" in the trilogy) and Royal Affairs in Versailles (1954, in a small role). The latter was a letdown for her with its heavy-handed and ponderous direction; it was finally screened in the U.S. in 1957.

In 1954, Colbert turned down a million-dollar broadcast deal with NBC-TV, but made a pact with CBS-TV to star in several teleplays. After a successful appearance in a television version of The Royal Family (1954, co-starring Fredric March)—a parody of the Barrymore family featured on The Best of Broadway series—she took on more than 20 television works, including talk shows, until 1960. She starred in major television adaptation of The Bells of St. Mary's in 1959, and guest-starred on anthology drama series such as Robert Montgomery Presents and Playhouse 90. Also, she garnered praise from television critics in special productions such as The Guardsman (1955), and Blithe Spirit (1956). A documentary and information program Woman! (for which she was host in 1959) did well enough.

One of her best TV roles was as a Seattle's widow on One Coast of White (1957), co-starring Paul Henreid. One critic wrote, "Colbert has not lost any of the old magic she exercised on the screen."

In 1957, she was cast as Lucy Bradford, wife of schoolteacher Jim Bradford (Jeff Morrow), in the Blood in the Dust episode of CBS's Dick Powell's Zane Grey Theatre. In the story, Jim refuses to back down when a gunman orders him to leave town, and Lucy is distressed because Jim hasn't fired a weapon since he was in the Civil War. In the show's 1960 episode So Young the Savage Land, she played Beth Brayden, who becomes disillusioned with her rancher-husband Jim (John Dehner) when he turns to violence to protect their property. Around 1960, she said that American audiences are much harder to entertain nowadays. With so much free (TV) theater coming into the home they have become critics.

In 1956, Colbert hosted the 28th Academy Awards ceremony. She returned to Broadway to replace Margaret Sullavan in Janus that year. This was followed by the 1958 play The Marriage-Go-Round, for which she was nominated for a Best Actress Tony Award. It ran for over 450 performances.

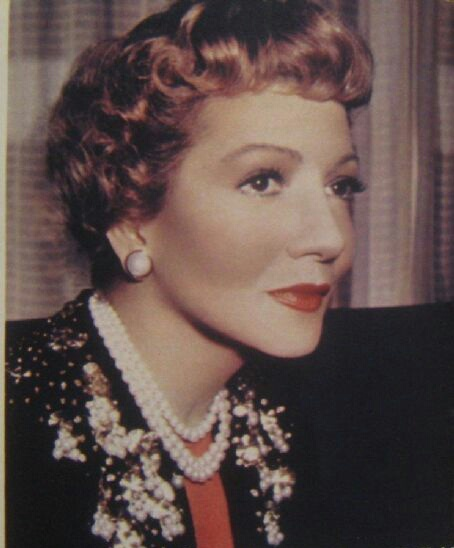
Colbert during TV production in 1959

During her career, Colbert played in more than 60 movies. For her contribution to the motion picture industry, she was honoured with a star on the Hollywood Walk of Fame in 1960.

Her last starring film was the western Texas Lady (1955), followed by a one-shot return to film appearance in the Delmer Daves' soap opera Parrish (1961, in a supporting role). The latter was a commercial success, but Colbert received little attention, and she directed her agent to end any further attempts to generate interest in her as a TV actress. Even at this period, she still looked younger than her actual age. The same year, another of her plays, Julia, Jake and Uncle Joe ran for only two performances.

=== Later career, 1963–1987 ===
Colbert made numerous appearances on Broadway and in other theaters for over the next two decades: The Irregular Verb to Love (1963-1964) opposite Cyril Ritchard; in Miami, Diplomatic Relations (1965) opposite Brian Aherne; in Manhattan, Fabulous Forties (1972); in across the U.S., A Community of Two (1974); in Detroit, recreated The Marriage Go-Round (1976) with Michael Evans; and A Talent for Murder (1981). This was followed by the 1978 play The Kingfisher (1978), with co-star Rex Harrison, for which she earned a Sarah Siddons Award for her Chicago theater work in 1980; and Frederick Lonsdale's Aren't We All? (1985), also with Harrison, first in London and then the U.S. (including West Coast) and Australia, for which she earned a Drama Desk Special Award. She told an interviewer, "Audiences always sound like they're glad to see me, and I'm damned glad to see them."

She also appeared in Maxwell House Coffee TV commercials from 1963 to 1965. In 1969 she expressed her intention to write a book entitled How to Run a House for her friend Bennett Cerf's Random House Press. This project was never completed. Towards the end of her life, she explained why she had never written her autobiography, "I've been happy, and that's no story." She served as the narrator in the BBC TV series Yesterday's Witness episode Sylvia of Sarawak (1972).

In 1984, she received a Gala Tribute from the Film Society of Lincoln Center. Her final credits included the audiobook Gift from the Sea (1986, as narrator) and the television miniseries The Two Mrs. Grenvilles (1987, in a supporting role). The latter, based on the bestselling novel, was a ratings success, and for which she earned a Golden Globe and also an Emmy nomination. In 1989 she received the Kennedy Center Honors.

Modern critics have pointed out that Colbert had a unique set of assets—her heart-shaped face, distinct facial features, curly hair, aristocratic manner, relaxed acting, little mysterious, and intelligent style,—that distinguishes her from other classic cinema stars through the 1930s and 1940s. In her comedies, she invariably played shrewd, self-reliant women; unlike many of her contemporaries, though, she rarely engaged in physical comedy. Her characters were more likely to be observers and commentators.

== Personal life ==
In 1928, Colbert married actor and director Norman Foster, with whom she co-starred in the Broadway show The Barker. Their marriage remained a secret for many years while they lived in separate homes. In Los Angeles, Colbert shared a home with her aunt and her mother. The latter disliked Foster and reputedly did not allow him into the home.

Colbert and Foster divorced in 1935 in Mexico. Until the early 1950s, Colbert's confidante was always her aunt, because her mother was imperious and indifferent to her work.

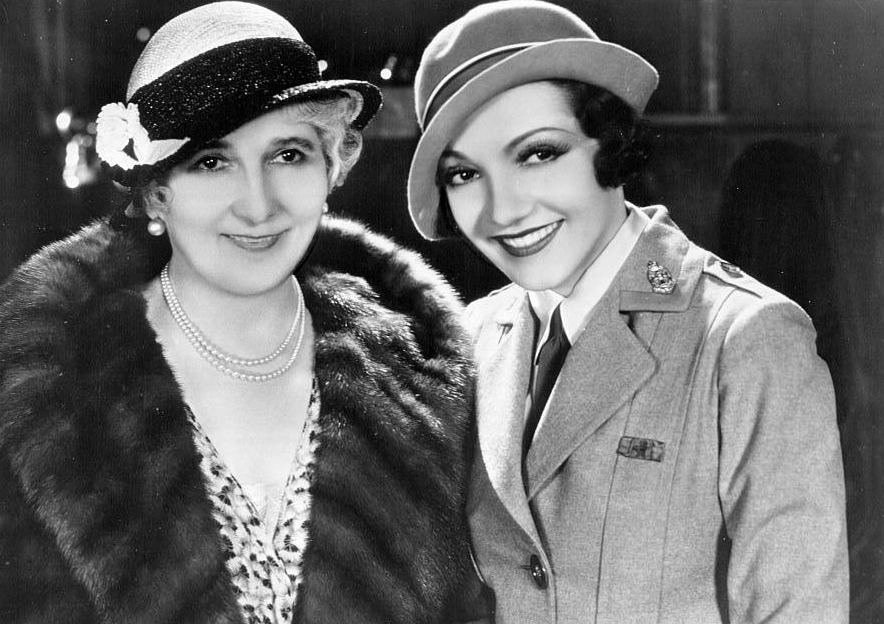
Colbert and her mother, Jeanne, in 1932

On Christmas Eve, 1935, Colbert married Dr. Joel Pressman, who eventually became a professor and chief of the head and neck surgery department of UCLA Medical School. She gave him a Beechcraft airplane as a present. They purchased a ranch in northern California, where she enjoyed horseback riding.

Colbert's mother made her brother serve as his sister's agent for a time. He was credited with negotiating some of her more lucrative contracts in the late 1930s and early 1940s.

Although virtually retired from motion pictures since the mid-1950s, Colbert continued to maintain an upscale lifestyle. She had a country house in Palm Springs for weekends. An advertising executive said, "Claudette was extravagant; I never, ever saw her question the price of anything." In 1963, Colbert sold her Lloyd Wright-designed residence in Holmby Hills, and she and Dr. Pressman rented a small house in Beverly Hills.

In 1958, she met Verna Hull, a wealthy painter, photographer, and the stepdaughter of a Sears Roebuck heiress. They had a nine-year friendship that included travel, and an interest in art, and they rented twin New York penthouses. When Colbert bought a house in Barbados in the early 1960s, Hull bought a house next door, amid rumors that their friendship was a romantic one, which Colbert denied. The friendship ended after an argument that took place as Colbert's husband lay dying, during which Hull insisted that Pressman would not only take his own life, but Colbert's as well, rather than die alone.

In 1964, Colbert went on a safari trip with Pressman. The marriage lasted 33 years, until his death from liver cancer in 1968.

Colbert was a lifelong Republican.

=== Final years and death ===
For years, Colbert divided her time between her Manhattan apartment and her vacation home in Speightstown, Barbados, West Indies. The latter, purchased from a British gentleman and nicknamed Bellerive, was the island's only plantation house fronting the beach. Her permanent address remained Manhattan. When her mother died in 1970, and her brother in 1971, Colbert's only surviving relative was her brother's first wife's daughter, Coco Lewis. After that, the widow and second wife of her brother, moved from Florida to Barbados to live with Colbert.

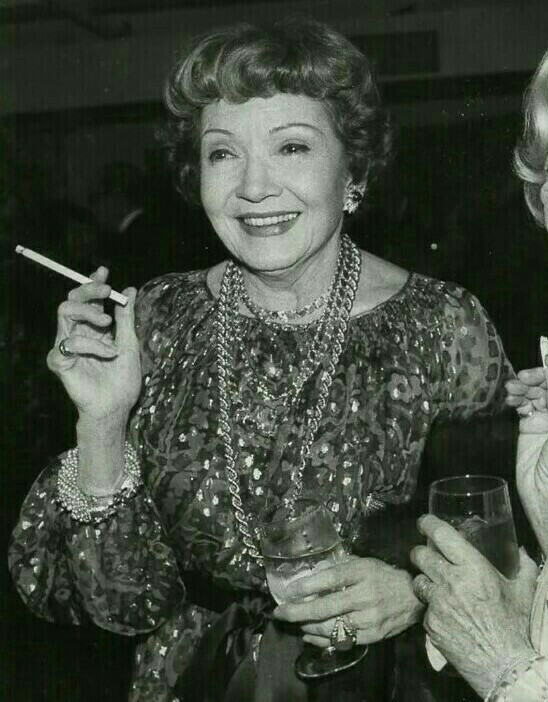
At a party honoring Lillian Hellman with the Dorothy Shaver Rose Award on 1977, New York City

Colbert was a long-time friend of Nancy Reagan, whom she first met in 1950, and Ronald Reagan, with whom she worked in the TV show General Electric Theater episode The Last Town Car (1958). Colbert's other celebrity friends included Kirk Douglas, Jack Benny, Rosalind Russell, Slim Keith, Lillian Hellman, Frank Sinatra, and Mia Farrow.

Colbert suffered a series of small strokes during the last three years of her life. She died in 1996 in Barbados at the age of 92, where she had employed a housekeeper and two cooks. Her remains were transported to New York City for cremation and funeral services. A requiem mass was later held at Church of St. Vincent Ferrer in Manhattan. Her ashes are laid to rest in the Godings Bay Church Cemetery, Speightstown, Saint Peter, Barbados, alongside her mother and second husband.

Colbert never had children. She left most of her estate, estimated at $3.5 million and including her Manhattan apartment and Bellerive, to longtime friend Helen O'Hagan, a retired director of corporate relations at Saks Fifth Avenue. Colbert had met O'Hagan in 1961 on the set of Parrish, her last film, and they became good friends in 1970. Although O'Hagan was financially comfortable without the generous bequest, Bellerive was sold for over $2 million to David Geffen. Colbert's will also left $150,000 to her niece Coco Lewis; a trust of over $100,000 to UCLA, in Dr. Pressman's memory; and $75,000 to Marie Corbin, her Bajan housekeeper.

== Selected filmography ==
The following is a list of feature films in which Colbert had top billing.

- The Hole in the Wall (1929)
- Young Man of Manhattan (1930)
- Manslaughter (1930)
- Honor Among Lovers (1931)
- Secrets of a Secretary (1931)
- The Wiser Sex (1932)
- Misleading Lady (1932)
- The Man from Yesterday (1932)
- Tonight Is Ours (1933)
- Three-Cornered Moon (1933)
- Torch Singer (1933)
- Four Frightened People (1934)
- Cleopatra (1934)
- Imitation of Life (1934)
- The Gilded Lily (1935)
- Private Worlds (1935)
- She Married Her Boss (1935)
- The Bride Comes Home (1935)
- Maid of Salem (1937)
- I Met Him in Paris (1937)
- Tovarich (1937)
- Bluebeard's Eighth Wife (1938)
- Zaza (1939)
- Midnight (1939)
- It's a Wonderful World (1939)
- Drums Along the Mohawk (1939)
- Arise, My Love (1940)
- Skylark (1941)
- Remember the Day (1941)
- The Palm Beach Story (1942)
- No Time for Love (1943)
- So Proudly We Hail! (1943)
- Since You Went Away (1944)
- Practically Yours (1944)
- Guest Wife (1945)
- Tomorrow Is Forever (1946)
- Without Reservations (1946)
- The Secret Heart (1946)
- The Egg and I (1947)
- Sleep, My Love (1948)
- Family Honeymoon (1949)
- Bride for Sale (1949)
- Three Came Home (1950)
- The Secret Fury (1950)
- Thunder on the Hill (1951)
- Let's Make It Legal (1951)
- The Planter's Wife (1952)
- Texas Lady (1955)

== Awards and honors ==
Year	Award	Category	Film	Result	Ref
1935	Academy Award	Best Actress	It Happened One Night	Won	
1936	Academy Award	Best Actress	Private Worlds	Nominated	
1945	Academy Award	Best Actress	Since You Went Away	Nominated	
1950	Photoplay Awards	Most Popular Female Star	Three Came Home	Nominated	
1951	Laurel Awards	Best Dramatic Performance (Female)	Three Came Home	Won	
1959	Tony Award	Best Actress	The Marriage-Go-Round	Nominated	
1960	Hollywood Walk of Fame	Star at 6812 Hollywood Blvd.	—N/a	Inducted	
1980	Sarah Siddons Award		The Kingfisher	Won	
1984	Film Society of Lincoln Center	Lifetime Achievement Award	—N/a	Won	
1985	Drama Desk Awards	Drama Desk Special Award	Aren't We All?	Won	
1987	Primetime Emmy Award	Outstanding Supporting Actress	The Two Mrs. Grenvilles	Nominated	
1988	Golden Globe Award	Best Supporting Actress in a Series	The Two Mrs. Grenvilles	Won	
1989	Kennedy Center Honors	Lifetime Achievement Award	—N/a	Won	
1990	San Sebastián International Film Festival	Donostia Award	—N/a	Won	
1999	American Film Institute	Greatest Female Stars	—N/a	12th	
2010	Online Film & Television Association	Film Hall of Fame	—N/a	Inducted	

== See also ==
- List of actors with Academy Award nominations
