= Three-Cornered Moon =

1933 film by Elliott Nugent

Three Cornered Moon
- Theatrical release poster
- Directed by: Elliott Nugent
- Screenplay by: Ray Harris; S. K. Lauren
- Based on: Three-Cornered Moon by Gertrude Tonkonogy
- Produced by: B. P. Schulberg
- Starring: Claudette Colbert; Richard Arlen; Mary Boland; Wallace Ford
- Cinematography: Leon Shamroy
- Edited by: Jane Loring
- Music by: Ralph Rainger
- Production company: Paramount Pictures
- Distributed by: Paramount Pictures
- Release date: August 8, 1933 (US)
- Running time: 77 minutes
- Country: United States
- Language: English
- Budget: $300,000

Three Cornered Moon is a 1933 American pre-Code comedy film directed by Elliott Nugent, written by Ray Harris and S.K. Lauren, and starring Claudette Colbert, Richard Arlen, Mary Boland, and Wallace Ford. Based on a 1933 play by Gertrude Tonkonogy Friedberg, the film reached No. 9 in the National Board of Review Awards top-10 films in 1933. Film critic Leonard Maltin identifies it as one of the "25 Vintage Movies You Really Shouldn't Miss". This film is often mentioned as one of the earliest examples of screwball comedy.

== Plot ==
Difficulties overtake a well-to-do family in New York when, due to margin calls, they lose all their money in the Great Depression, but all their problems are resolved magically in the end.

== Cast ==
- Claudette Colbert as Elizabeth Rimplegar
- Richard Arlen as Dr. Alan Stevens
- Mary Boland as Nellie Rimpleger
- Wallace Ford as Kenneth Rimpleger
- Lyda Roberti as Jenny
- Tom Brown as Eddie Rimplegar
- Joan Marsh as Kitty
- Hardie Albright as Ronald
- William Bakewell as Douglas Rimplegar
- Sam Hardy as Hawkins

== Reception ==
Elliott Nugent called the film "a rousing success".

== See also ==
- List of American films of 1933
