= Blithe Spirit (Ford Star Jubilee) =

- Ford Star Jubilee episode
- Episode no.: Season 1 Episode 5
- Directed by: Noël Coward; Frederick De Cordova
- Written by: Noël Coward
- Based on: Blithe Spirit by Noël Coward
- Original air date: 14 January 1956

Guest appearances
- Lauren Bacall as Elvira Condomine; Claudette Colbert as Ruth Condomine; Noël Coward as Charles Condomine; Brenda Forbes as Mrs. Bradman; Mildred Natwick as Madame Arcati; Marion Ross as Edith; Philip Tonge as Dr. Bradman

"Blithe Spirit" is a 1956 television play version of the play of the same name by Noël Coward. Coward directed and starred in the adaptation. It aired as an episode of Ford Star Jubilee.

== Production ==
Coward wrote in his diary that Colbert was "extremely tiresome" during rehearsals, not arriving at the first rehearsal knowing the words, being "exceedingly bossy", insisting on only being "photographed on one side of her face, so all grouping of scenes has to be arranged accordingly", constantly changing her mind over her dresses, and being "determined to play Ruth as a mixture of Mary Rose and Rebecca of Sunnybrook Farm, and very, very slowly. I have already had two stand-up fights with her, not very edifying and a hideous waste of time." He thought Bacall "is charming and no trouble; also, unfortunately, no comedienne, but she moves beautifully, looks ravishing and is trying like mad". He wrote Mildred Natwick "is wonderful: true, subtle and hilariously funny without ever being in the least grotesque".

Coward's leg was in great pain during rehearsals, requiring him to take injections of novocaine to get through it. He clashed with Colbert and was dissatisfied with a pre-show recording he did of the production. On 15 January, he wrote "It is all over and a triumphant success. How it managed to be I shall never know." He added "God preserve me in future from female stars. I don't suppose he will, but I might conceivably do something about this myself. I really am too old to go through all these tired old hoops."

== Notes ==
- Coward, Noel (1982). The Noël Coward diaries. Little, Brown.
