= The Boy Friend (cast recording) =

Cast recording by Various artists
- Released: 1954
- Genre: Show tune
- Label: RCA Victor

Julie Andrews chronology
The Boy Friend (1954)	High Tor (1956)

The Boy Friend is the original cast recording of the musical of the same name starring Julie Andrews, recorded during the original Broadway production. Set in the 1920s on the French Riviera, the show follows a romantic plot involving mistaken identities and class disguises. Written by Sandy Wilson, the musical premiered in London before transferring to Broadway, where its success led to the recording of the cast album.

Released by RCA Victor in 1954, the album features key musical numbers performed by the Broadway cast and was later reissued on CD. Known for its light-hearted style and period-inspired score, the recording received positive attention upon release.

== Background and release ==
The Boy Friend is sets on the French Riviera, it follows Polly, an English heiress at a finishing school, who falls for Tony, a delivery boy. To avoid fortune hunters, Polly pretends to be a working girl, unaware that Tony is actually the missing son of wealthy Lord Brockhurst. Written and composed by Sandy Wilson, the show began in London in 1953 with the Players' Club and later moved to the West End, where it opened on January 14, 1954. Following its success in the United Kingdom, the production was adapted for Broadway and opened at the Royale Theatre in New York.

Subsequent to the show's premiere, the cast recorded the musical numbers on October 10, 1954. The recording was released by RCA Victor as a 12" LP under the catalog number LOC-1018. It was also distributed in a 45 rpm box set. RCA released the album in compact disc in 1989, following the increasing popularity of the format. The recording captures selections performed by the Broadway cast and includes tracks such as "A Room in Bloomsbury" and "I Could Be Happy with You" and was released in monophonic sound.

In 2015, Él Records, a subsidiary of Cherry Red Records, included the three songs performed by Andrews on the CD Don't Go in the Lion's Cage Tonight/Broadway's Fair Julie (ACMEM287CD, 2015).

== Critical reception ==
Professional ratings
Review scores
Source	Rating
Cash Box	Favorable
Cast Album Reviews	4/5 stars

Cash Box hailed it as a "must" for theatergoers, describing the music as "full of life and excitement" and " has all the charm and color of the "roaring" twenties", predicting it would be a "big seller".

David Wolf of Cast Album Records wrote that the Broadway cast "performs with punch and precision, and the score sounds great on this recording [...] especially the snazzy new overture, which rides to a dazzling conclusion.

In his Playbill article titled "From 'Mary Poppins' to 'Victor/Victoria': The Julie Andrews Albums Every Fan Should Own", Ben Rimalower included the album as an "honorable mention".

== Track listing ==
The Boy Friend (Original Broadway Cast Recording)
No.	Title	Writer(s)	Performer(s)	Length
1.	"Overture"	Sandy Wilson	The Bearcats	3:31
2.	"Perfect Young Ladies"	S. Wilson	Perfect Young Ladies, P. Girard	1:11
3.	"The Boy Friend"	S. Wilson	Julie Andrews, Ensemble	2:44
4.	"Fancy Forgetting"	S. Wilson	Ruth Altman, Eric Berry	2:22
5.	"Won't You Charleston With Me?"	S. Wilson	Ann Wakefield, Bob Scheerer	3:16
6.	"I Could Be Happy With You"	S. Wilson	Andrews, John Hewer	3:19
7.	"Sur la Plage"	S. Wilson	The Ensemble	1:50
8.	"A Room in Bloomsbury"	S. Wilson	J. Andrews, J. Hewer	2:43
9.	"Safety in Numbers"	S. Wilson	A. Wakefield, The Boy Friends	2:49
10.	"The You Don't Want to Play With Me Blues"	S. Wilson	Attman, Berry, The Berfect Young Ladies	3:10
11.	"The Riviera"	S. Wilson	A. Wakefield, B. Scheerer, The Ensemble	2:53
12.	"It's Never Too Late to Fall in Love"	S. Wilson	Geoff Hibbert, Dilys Lay	3:02
13.	"Carnival Tango"	S. Wilson	The Bearcats	2:17
14.	"Poor Little Pierrette"	S. Wilson	R. Altman, J. Andrews	3:28
15.	"Finale: The Boy Friend / I Could Be Happy With You"	Geoffrey Burgon, Stephen Schwartz, S. Wilson	J. Andrews, J. Hewer	1:28

== Personnel ==
Adapted from the album's liner notes.

- Lyrics, music and written by Sandy Wilson
- Directed by Vida Hope
- Orchestra by Paul McGrane and His Bearcats
- Orchestrated by Charles L. Cooke, Ted Royal
- Liner notes by Bill Zeitung
- Design by Auerbach
