= Julie Andrews on screen and stage =

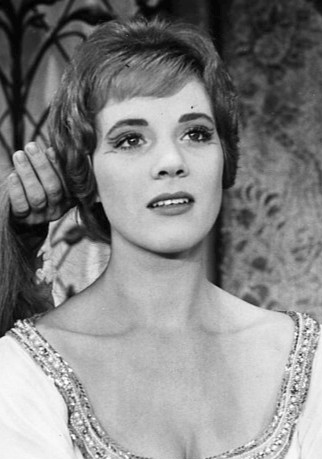
Andrews as Queen Guinevere in 1960 production of the musical Camelot

Julie Andrews is an English actress, singer, and theatrical director who has had a lifelong career on the screen and stage. She made her film debut voice-dubbing the role of Princess Zeila in the 1949 animated film La Rosa di Bagdad. Her professional stage debut on Broadway was in the musical comedy The Boy Friend where she played Polly Brown from 1954 to 1955. For this role, she won the Theatre World Award for Outstanding Broadway Debut in 1955. Then from 1956 to 1959, Andrews played Eliza Doolittle in My Fair Lady which earned her a Tony Award nomination, the first of three that she received during her career. After this success, she played the title role in the 1957 television special Rogers and Hammerstein's Cinderella. For this appearance, she received her first Primetime Emmy Award nomination for Outstanding Actress – Best Single Performance – Lead or Support. She received her second Tony nomination in 1961 when she originated the role of Queen Guinevere in Camelot. After this, she auditioned for the role of Eliza Doolittle in the 1964 film adaptation of My Fair Lady, losing the role to Audrey Hepburn. Instead, Andrews was cast as the title role in the 1964 musical film Mary Poppins. For this role, she received an Academy Award, a BAFTA Award, a Golden Globe, and a Grammy Award. Her next big success was portraying Maria Von Trapp in the 1965 musical film The Sound of Music. For her portrayal, she received a second Golden Globe, another Academy Award nomination and another BAFTA nomination.

Between 1964 and 1986, Andrews starred in many films including The Americanization of Emily (1964), Hawaii (1966), Torn Curtain (1966), Thoroughly Modern Millie (1967), Star! (1968), The Tamarind Seed (1974), 10 (1979), S.O.B. (1981), Victor/Victoria (1982) for which she earned her sixth Golden Globe, That's Life! (1986) and Duet for One (1986). From 1972 to 1973, she hosted her own variety show titled The Julie Andrews Hour. The program earned her a Primetime Emmy Award and a second nomination. In 1992, she starred in the short-lived American sitcom Julie. She returned to the stage in the Stephen Sondheim-themed musical revue Putting It Together, where she starred as Amy, in 1993. She reprised her role as Victoria Grant / Count Victor Grezhinski for the 1995 Broadway adaptation of Victor/Victoria. This earned her a third Tony Award nomination, though she declined, citing that she felt that the rest of the company had been overlooked, and her first Drama Desk Award. Since 2000, she has been seen on screen as Queen Clarisse Renaldi in The Princess Diaries (2001) and its sequel (2004) and as Lily the Head Fairy in Tooth Fairy (2010). She has lent her voice to Shrek 2 (2004), Shrek the Third, Enchanted (both 2007), Shrek Forever After Despicable Me (both 2010), Despicable Me 3 (2017), Aquaman (2018), and Minions: The Rise of Gru (2022). In 2017, she directed a revival of My Fair Lady at the Sydney Opera House for Opera Australia. Her direction earned her a nomination for the Helpmann Award for Best Direction of a Musical. The same year, she co-created and hosted a children's educational show titled Julie's Greenroom, for which she received two Daytime Emmy Award nominations.

== Film ==
Year	Title	Role	Notes
1952	La Rosa di Bagdad	Princess Zeila	Voice; 1952 English dub made in 1949
1964	Mary Poppins	Mary Poppins	Academy Award for Best Actress
1964	The Americanization of Emily	Emily Barham	
1965	Salzburg Sight and Sound	Herself	Short subject
1965	The Sound of Music	Maria von Trapp	
1966	Torn Curtain	Dr. Sarah Louise Sherman	
1966	Hawaii	Jerusha Bromley	
1967	Think Twentieth	Herself	Short subject
1967	Thoroughly Modern Millie	Millie Dillmount	
1968	Star!	Gertrude Lawrence	
1970	Darling Lili	Lili Smith/Schmidt	
1971	The Moviemakers	Herself	Short subject
1972	Julie	Herself	Documentary
1974	The Tamarind Seed	Judith Farrow	
1975	The Return of the Pink Panther	Maid	Scene cut
1976	The Pink Panther Strikes Again	Ainsley Jarvis (singing voice)	Uncredited
1979	10	Samantha Taylor	
1980	Little Miss Marker	Amanda Worthington	
1981	S.O.B.	Sally Miles	
1982	Victor/Victoria	Victoria Grant / Count Victor Grezhinski	
1982	Trail of the Pink Panther	Charwoman	Uncredited
1983	The Man Who Loved Women	Marianna	
1986	That's Life!	Gillian Fairchild	
1986	Duet for One	Stephanie Anderson	
1991	A Fine Romance	Mrs. Pamela Piquet	Cin cin – Italian title
2000	Relative Values	Felicity Marshwood	
2001	The Princess Diaries	Queen Clarisse Renaldi	
2002	Unconditional Love	Herself	Cameo appearance
2004	The Princess Diaries 2: Royal Engagement	Queen Clarisse Renaldi	
2004	Shrek 2	Lillian	Voice
2007	Shrek the Third	Lillian	Voice
2007	Enchanted	Narrator	
2010	Tooth Fairy	Lily the Head Fairy	
2010	Shrek Forever After	Lillian	Voice
2010	Despicable Me	Mrs Gru	Voice
2017	Despicable Me 3	Mrs Gru	Voice
2018	Aquaman	Karathen	Voice
2022	The King's Daughter	Narrator	
2022	Minions: The Rise of Gru	Marlena	Voice

== Television ==
Year	Title	Role	Notes
1956	Ford Star Jubilee	Lise	Episode: High Tor with Bing Crosby
1957	Rodgers and Hammerstein's Cinderella	Cinderella	TV special; Original live broadcast, 31 March
1959	The Gentle Flame	Trissa	TV movie, BBC
1961	The Ed Sullivan Show	Herself	CBS special tribute to Alan Jay Lerner and Frederick Loewe; performed songs from Brigadoon, My Fair Lady and Camelot
1962	The Garry Moore Show	Herself	Season 5 – Episode 1
1962	Julie and Carol at Carnegie Hall	Herself	TV special
1964	The Andy Williams Show	Herself	
1965	The Julie Andrews Show	Host	
1969	A World in Music	Herself	Episode: "An Evening with Julie Andrews and Harry Belafonte"
1971	Julie and Carol at Lincoln Center	Herself	
1972–1973	The Julie Andrews Hour	Host	TV series (24 episodes)
1973	Julie on Sesame Street	Herself	
1974	The Dick Cavett Show	Herself	
1974	Julie and Dick at Covent Garden	Herself	
1974	Julie and Jackie: How Sweet It Is	Herself	
1975	Julie: My Favorite Things	Herself	
1976	Peter Pan	Herself	Singer - Title Song, "Once Upon a Bedtime"
1977	The Muppet Show	Herself	
1978	Julie Andrews: One Step Into Spring	Herself – host	
1981	The CBS Festival of Lively Arts for Young People	Herself	
1987	Julie Andrews: The Sound of Christmas	Herself	
1989	Julie & Carol: Together Again	Herself	
1990	Julie Andrews in Concert	Herself	
1991	Our Sons	Audrey Grant	TV movie
1992	Julie	Julie Carlisle	TV series (7 episodes)
1992	The King & I	Anna	TV musical
1993	Sound of Orchestra	Host	
1995	The Sound of Julie Andrews	Host	
1995	Victor/Victoria	Victoria Grant / Count Victor Grezhinski	TV movie
1999	One Special Night	Catherine Howard	
2001	My Favorite Broadway: The Love Songs	Narrator/Host	
2001	On Golden Pond	Ethel Thayer	TV movie
2003	Eloise at the Plaza	Nanny	TV movie
2003	Eloise at Christmastime	Nanny	TV movie
2004	Broadway: The American Musical	Narrator/Host	Six-part PBS documentary series about musical theatre
2009–2010, 2012–2017	Great Performances	Narrator/Host	Episode "From Vienna: The New Year's Celebration"
2012	The Colbert Report	Guest	
2014	The One Show	Guest	
2014, 2019	The Graham Norton Show	Guest	2 episodes
2017	Julie's Greenroom	Miss Julie	Co-creator; Netflix series
2020–present	Bridgerton	Lady Whistledown (voice)	
2022	AFI Life Achievement: Julie Andrews	Herself	TV special
2023	Carol Burnett: 90 Years of Laughter + Love	Herself	TV special
2023	Queen Charlotte: A Bridgerton Story	Lady Whistledown (voice)	5 episodes
2023	Dick Van Dyke: 98 Years of Magic	Herself	TV special
2024	Blake Edwards: A Love Story in 24 Frames	Herself	TV special

== Stage ==
Year	Title	Role	Theatre
1949	RADA Cabaret		Lyceum Theatre, London
1954–1955	The Boy Friend	Polly Brown	Royale Theatre, Broadway
1956–1959	My Fair Lady	Eliza Doolittle	Mark Hellinger Theatre, Broadway; Theatre Royal Drury Lane, West End
1960–1962	Camelot	Queen Guenevere	Majestic Theatre, Broadway
1993	Putting It Together	Amy	Manhattan Theatre Club, Off-Broadway
1995–1997	Victor/Victoria	Victoria Grant / Count Victor Grezhinski	Marquis Theatre, Broadway
1998–1999	Doctor Dolittle	Polynesia (voice)	Hammersmith, West End
2003–2005	The Boy Friend	Director	

== See also ==
- List of awards and nominations received by Julie Andrews
