= List of awards and nominations received by Julie Andrews =

Julie Andrews awards and nominations
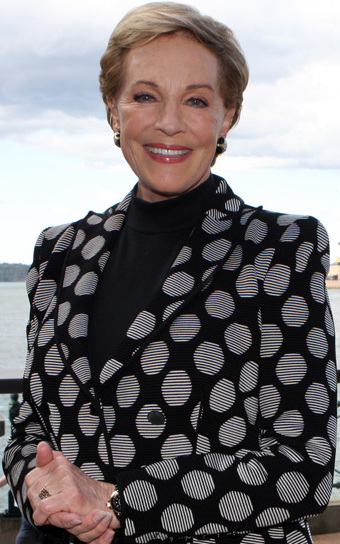
- Andrews in Sydney, Australia in 2013
Awards and nominations
Award	Wins	Nominations
Academy Awards	1	3
British Academy Film Awards	1	2
Emmy Awards	4	16
Golden Globe Awards	7	14
Grammy Awards	2	4
Tony Awards	0	3

Totals (Note: Certain award groups do not simply award one winner. They acknowledge several different recipients, have runners-up, and have third place. Since this is a specific recognition and is different from losing an award, runner-up mentions are considered wins in this award tally. For simplification and to avoid errors, each award in this list has been presumed to have had a prior nomination.)
- Wins: 69
- Nominations: 135

Dame Julie Andrews is an English actress, singer, and director. Known for her performances on stage and screen, she has received several accolades including an Academy Award, a British Academy Film Award, seven Golden Globe Awards, two Grammy Awards, and four Primetime Emmy Awards as well as a nomination for three Tony Awards. She has been honored with the Kennedy Center Honors in 2001 the Screen Actors Guild Lifetime Achievement Award in 2007, the Venice Film Festival's Golden Lion in 2019 and the AFI Life Achievement Award in 2022.

Andrews started her career on stage making her Broadway debut in the musical The Boy Friend (1954) earning a Theater World Award. She gained her breakthrough for her role as Eliza Doolittle in the Lerner and Loewe musical My Fair Lady (1957) for which she was nominated for the Tony Award for Best Actress in a Musical. She continued to gain acclaim and Tony-award nominations for her portrayals of Queen Guinevere in the Lerner and Loewe musical Camelot (1961), and Victoria Grant in the Blake Edwards musical Victor/Victoria (1982). The later of which earned her the Drama Desk Award for Outstanding Actress in a Musical. She acted in the off-Broadway Stephen Sondheim revue Putting It Together (1993) for which she earned an Outer Critics Circle Award as well as a nomination for the Drama Desk Award for Outstanding Featured Actress in a Musical.

On film, she made her debut portraying the title role in the Walt Disney family fantasy film Mary Poppins (1964) for which she won the Academy Award for Best Actress, the Golden Globe Award for Best Actress in a Motion Picture – Musical or Comedy, and the BAFTA Award for Most Promising Newcomer. She portrayed Maria von Trapp in the musical epic The Sound of Music (1965) earning the Golden Globe Award for Best Actress in a Motion Picture – Musical or Comedy as well as a nomination for the Academy Award for Best Actress and the BAFTA Award for Best British Actress. She won another Golden Globe for her leading role in the Blake Edwards comedy Victor/Victoria (1982) and was Globe-nominated for her roles in Thoroughly Modern Millie (1967), Star! (1969), Darling Lili (1970), 10 (1979), That's Life! (1986), and Duet for One (1986).

On television, she gained national prominence for playing the title role in the CBS live staging of the Rodgers and Hammerstein musical Cinderella (1957) for which she was nominated for the Best Single Performance – Lead or Supporting Actress. She hosted the ABC variety series The Julie Andrews Hour (1972–1973), for which she won the Primetime Emmy Award for Outstanding Variety Series. She played a kind Nanny in the family Christmas film Eloise at Christmastime (2003) for which she was nominated for the Primetime Emmy Award for Outstanding Supporting Actress in a Miniseries or Movie. She currently portrays Lady Whistledown in the Netflix costume romance series Bridgerton (2020–present) and Queen Charlotte (2023), for which she's received four Primetime Emmy Awards for Outstanding Character Voice-Over Performance, winning once.

She earned a Star on the Hollywood Walk of Fame in 1979, and received the Disney Legend in 1991 for her work on Mary Poppins. She has also won accolades from the New York Film Critics Circle Awards, Laurel Awards, People's Choice Awards, and Nickelodeon Kids' Choice Awards.

== Major associations ==
=== Academy Awards ===
Year	Category	Nominated work	Result	Ref.
1964	Best Actress	Mary Poppins	Won	
1965	Best Actress	The Sound of Music	Nominated	
1982	Best Actress	Victor/Victoria	Nominated	

=== BAFTA Awards ===
Year	Category	Nominated work	Result	Ref.
British Academy Film Awards
1965	Most Promising Newcomer to Leading Film Roles	Mary Poppins	Won	
1966	Best British Actress	The Americanization of Emily / The Sound of Music	Nominated	

=== Emmy Awards ===
Year	Category	Nominated work	Result	Ref.
Primetime Emmy Awards
1958	Actress – Best Single Performance – Lead or Support	Cinderella	Nominated	
1965	Outstanding Individual Achievements in Entertainment	The Andy Williams Show	Nominated	
1972	Outstanding Variety Special	Julie and Carol at Lincoln Center	Nominated	
1973	Outstanding New Series	The Julie Andrews Hour	Nominated	
1973	Outstanding Variety Musical Series	The Julie Andrews Hour	Won	
1995	Outstanding Performance in a Variety or Music Program	The Sound of Julie Andrews	Nominated	
2004	Outstanding Supporting Actress in a Miniseries or a Movie	Eloise at Christmastime	Nominated	
2005	Outstanding Nonfiction Series	Broadway: The American Musical	Won	
2021	Outstanding Character Voice-Over Performance	Bridgerton (episode: "Diamond of the First Water")	Nominated	
2022	Outstanding Character Voice-Over Performance	Bridgerton (episode: "Capital R Rake")	Nominated	
2023	Outstanding Character Voice-Over Performance	Queen Charlotte (episode: "Honeymoon Bliss")	Nominated	
2025	Outstanding Character Voice-Over Performance	Bridgerton (episode: "Into the Light")	Won	
2026	Outstanding Character Voice-Over Performance	Bridgerton (episode: "The Waltz")	Won	
Daytime Emmy Awards
1981	Outstanding Performer in Children's Programming	The CBS Festival of Lively Arts for Young People	Nominated	
2017	Outstanding Writing in a Children's, Pre-School Children's or Family Viewing Program	Julie's Greenroom	Nominated	
2017	Outstanding Preschool Children's Series	Julie's Greenroom	Nominated	

=== Golden Globe Awards ===
Year	Category	Nominated work	Result	Ref.
1964	Best Actress – Motion Picture Comedy or Musical	Mary Poppins	Won	
1965	Best Actress – Motion Picture Comedy or Musical	The Sound of Music	Won	
1966	Henrietta Award — World Film Favorite — Female	—	Won	
1967	Best Actress – Motion Picture Comedy or Musical	Thoroughly Modern Millie	Nominated	
1967	Henrietta Award — World Film Favorite — Female	—	Won	
1968	Henrietta Award — World Film Favorite — Female	—	Won	
1968	Best Actress – Motion Picture Comedy or Musical	Star!	Nominated	
1969	Henrietta Award — World Film Favorite — Female	—	Won	
1970	Best Actress – Motion Picture Comedy or Musical	Darling Lili	Nominated	
1972	Best Actress – Television Series Musical or Comedy	The Julie Andrews Hour	Nominated	
1979	Best Actress – Motion Picture Comedy or Musical	10	Nominated	
1982	Best Actress – Motion Picture Comedy or Musical	Victor/Victoria	Won	
1986	Best Actress – Motion Picture Comedy or Musical	That's Life!	Nominated	
1986	Best Actress in a Motion Picture – Drama	Duet for One	Nominated	

=== Grammy Awards ===
Year	Category	Nominated work	Result	Ref.
1965	Best Recording for Children	Mary Poppins	Won	
1996	Best Traditional Pop Vocal Album	Broadway: The Music of Richard Rodgers	Nominated	
1998	Best Traditional Pop Vocal Album	Broadway: Here I'll Stay — The Words of Alan Jay Lerner	Nominated	
2011	Best Spoken Word Album for Children	Julie Andrews' Collection of Poems, Songs and Lullabies	Won	

=== Screen Actors Guild Awards ===
Year	Category	Nominated work	Result	Ref.
2021	Outstanding Ensemble in a Drama Series	Bridgerton	Nominated	

=== Tony Awards ===
Year	Category	Nominated work	Result	Ref.
1957	Best Actress in a Musical	My Fair Lady	Nominated	
1961	Best Actress in a Musical	Camelot	Nominated	
1996	Best Actress in a Musical	Victor/Victoria †	Nominated	

† Andrews declined the nomination for her role in Victor/Victoria, citing she felt the rest of the company had been overlooked.

== Miscellaneous awards ==
Association	Year	Category	Nominated work	Result	Ref.
David di Donatello Awards	1966	Best Foreign Actress	The Sound of Music	Won	
David di Donatello Awards	1983	Best Foreign Actress	Victor/Victoria	Won	
Drama Desk Award	1993	Outstanding Featured Actress in a Musical	Putting It Together	Nominated	
Drama Desk Award	1996	Outstanding Actress in a Musical	Victor/Victoria	Won	
Eddie Awards	1965	Best Performance by an Actress in a Film Debut	My Fair Lady	Won	
Eddie Awards	1966	Best Actress in a Feature Motion Picture	The Sound of Music	Won	
Golden Plate Award	2004	The Arts	Herself	Won	
Hasty Pudding Theatricals	1982	Woman of the Year	Herself	Won	
Helpmann Awards	2017	Best Direction of a Musical (Note: (Opera Australia & John Frost))	My Fair Lady	Nominated	
Kansas City Film Critics Circle	1982	Best Actress	Victor/Victoria	Won	
Las Vegas Film Critics Society	2005	William Holden Lifetime Achievement Award	Herself	Won	
Laurel Awards	1965	Best Female Musical Performance	My Fair Lady	Won	
Laurel Awards	1965	Female Star (3rd Place)	Herself	Nominated	
Laurel Awards	1966	Best Female Musical Performance	The Sound of Music	Won	
Laurel Awards	1966	Female Star (2nd Place)	Herself	Nominated	
Laurel Awards	1967	Female Star	Herself	Won	
Laurel Awards	1968	Best Female Comedy Performance	Thoroughly Modern Millie	Won	
Laurel Awards	1970	Female Star (6th Place)	Herself	Nominated	
Laurel Awards	1971	Female Star (10th Place)	Herself	Nominated	
New York Film Critics Circle	1964	Best Actress	Mary Poppins	Runner-up	
New York Film Critics Circle	1965	Best Actress	The Sound of Music	Runner-up	
People's Choice Awards	1982	Favorite Movie Actress	Herself	Won	
Nickelodeon Kids' Choice Awards	2002	Favorite Movie Actress	The Princess Diaries	Nominated	
Outer Critics Circle Awards	1993	Special Award	Putting It Together	Won	
Outer Critics Circle Awards	1996	Outstanding Actress in a Musical	Victor/Victoria	Won	
Sant Jordi Awards	1982	Best Performance in a Foreign Film	Victor/Victoria	Nominated	
Theatre World Award	1955	Outstanding Broadway Debut	The Boy Friend	Won	
Women in Film	1993	Crystal Award	Herself	Won	

== Honorary awards ==
Organizations	Year	Award	Result	Ref.
Hollywood Chamber of Commerce	1979	Hollywood Walk of Fame	Inducted	
British Academy Film Awards	1989	BAFTA Special Award	Honored	
Walt Disney Company	1991	Disney Legends	Honored	
John F. Kennedy Center for the Performing Arts	2001	Kennedy Center Honors	Honored	
Society of Singers	2001	Society of Singers Life Achievement	Honored	
San Sebastián International Film Festival	2001	Donostia Award	Honored	
Screen Actors Guild Awards	2007	Life Achievement Award	Honored	
American Academy of Neurology	2007	Public Leadership in Neurology Award	Honored	
University of California, Los Angeles	2009	George and Ira Gershwin Award	Honored	
Grammy Awards	2011	Lifetime Achievement Award	Honored	
Princess Grace Foundation	2011	Prince Rainier Award (Note: Outstanding contribution to motion picture, television and theatre arts)	Honored	
Hamptons International Film Festival	2017	Lifetime Achievement Award	Honored	
Venice International Film Festival	2019	Career Golden Lion	Honored	
American Film Institute	2022	AFI Life Achievement Award	Honored	

== Honorary degrees ==
Andrews has received many honorary degrees in recognition of her distinguished career in entertainment. These include:

- 1970: University of Maryland – Doctor of Fine Arts
- 1999: Yale University – Doctor of Fine Arts
- 2012: Stony Brook University – Doctor of Letters
