= Victor/Victoria (1995 film) =

- DVD cover
- Genre: Comedy; Musical
- Written by: Blake Edwards
- Directed by: Blake Edwards; Matthew Diamond; Goro Kobayashi
- Starring: Julie Andrews; Tony Roberts; Michael Nouri; Rachel York
- Music by: Henry Mancini; Frank Wildhorn
- Country of origin: United States
- Original language: English

Production
- Executive producers: Jeff Rowland; John Scher; Shuichi Amagai; David Horn; Elke Titus
- Producers: Allen Newman; Philip W. Hack; Bill Murphy
- Production location: New York City
- Cinematography: Arthur R. Botham
- Running time: 146 minutes
- Production companies: Endemol Theater Productions; Polygram Broadway Venctors

Original release
- Network: NHK
- Release: December 23, 1995

Victor/Victoria is a 1995 videotaped television production of the Broadway musical of the same name written and directed by Blake Edwards, starring Julie Andrews, Tony Roberts, Michael Nouri, Rachel York, Richard B. Shull and Gregory Jbara. The play's opening night performance on October 25, 1995 at the Marquis Theatre in New York City was filmed exclusively for Japanese television broadcast by NHK on December 23, 1995. It was directed for the stage by Edwards and directed for television by Matthew Diamond and Goro Kobayashi.

== Synopsis ==
Victoria (Andrews) is a penniless out-of-work singer whose life is changed when she meets the flamboyant gay impresario Toddy (Roberts) and, with his help, she becomes "Victor", an overnight singing sensation in the nightclubs of Paris. But success becomes hilariously complicated when she meets the love of her life – King Marchand (Nouri), a macho Chicago gangster – who sees the act and finds himself attracted to the star.

== Cast ==
- Julie Andrews as Victoria Grant
- Tony Roberts as Carroll "Toddy" Todd
- Michael Nouri as King Marchand
- Rachel York as Norma Cassidy
- Richard B. Shull as André Cassell
- Gregory Jbara as Squash (Mr. Bernstein)

== Musical numbers ==
- "Paris by Night" – Toddy & Les Boys
- "If I Were a Man" – Victoria
- "Trust Me" – Toddy & Victoria
- "Le Jazz Hot" – Victor and Ensemble
- "The Tango/Paris by Night" – Victor & Norma
- "Paris Makes Me Horny" – Norma
- "Crazy World" – Victoria
- "Louis Says" – Victor & Ensemble
- "King's Dilemma" – King Marchand
- "You & Me" – Toddy and Victor
- "Paris by Night (Reprise)" – Street Singer
- "Almost a Love Song" – King Marchand and Victoria
- "Chicago, Illinois" – Norma & The Girls
- "Living in the Shadows" – Victoria
- "Victor/Victoria" – Victoria, Toddy & Company

== Home media ==
Performances of Victor/Victoria were released on DVD and Blu-ray Disc by Image Entertainment, one of which is also available for digital download on iTunes. The Blu-ray release is of the opening night performance and the DVD release is of another performance, as the taped opening night performance contained a few minor technical gaffes.
