= Le Jazz Hot! =

- A-side label of UK vinyl single

Single by Julie Andrews

from the album Victor/Victoria
- B-side: "The Shady Dame From Seville"
- Released: 1982
- Genre: Musical, show tune
- Label: MGM
- Songwriters: Henry Mancini, Leslie Bricusse

Julie Andrews singles chronology
"It's Easy To Say" (1980)	"Le Jazz Hot!" (1982)	"Love Me Tender" (1983)

"Le Jazz Hot!" is a song from the 1982 musical film Victor/Victoria. It is sung by Victor/Victoria, performed by Julie Andrews in both the film and the original Broadway cast. Le Jazz Hot was choreographed by Katherine Dunham.

== Synopsis ==
The song featured Victor/Victoria's debut to the world and the stage is themed with a piano and backup dancers. Victoria successfully fools the audience into believing that she is a male drag queen.

The Los Angeles Times explained:

This song marks Victor's nightclub debut, the number that will launch him as a drag queen sensation. The idea is that Victoria will begin the number and stun the audience at the end by revealing herself as Victor, the most brilliant female impersonator Paris has ever seen.

== Critical reception ==
Variety wrote "Victor’s debut, the sizzling "Le Jazz Hot", is a brassy, slinky tribute to New Orleans jazz, choreographed by Rob Marshall with tremendous energy." TV Guide deemed it "the film's one good number".Adelaide Theatre Guide called it "stylishly flattering". The LA Times wrote: "'Le Jazz Hot,' Andrews' big number in the first act, is a song that says nothing, but allows her to sing and look good while decked out in fringe and glitter". Hi-Def Digest said the song had "electrifying excitement".

== Cover versions ==
In the second season of television series Glee, the song is covered by the character Kurt Hummel, played by Chris Colfer.
