= Rachel York =

American actress, singer

- Born: 1966 or 1967 (age 58–59); Orlando, Florida, U.S.
- Occupations: Actress; singer
- Years active: 1989–present
- Spouse: Ayal Miodovnik (m. 2010)
- Children: 1
- Website: www.rachelyork.com

Rachel York (born 1966 or 1967) is an American actress and singer. Known for stage roles, including award-winning performances in Camelot, Hello, Dolly!, Into the Woods, and Anything Goes, her screen roles include a portrayal of Lucille Ball in the 2003 television film Lucy.

== Career ==
At age 19, York approached talent agent Bill Timms. She performed monologues from Nuts and Sophie's Choice and gave him a demo tape with songs from Evita. Timms signed her immediately and described her as being able to "... do anything."

=== Theatre ===
York made her Broadway debut as Mallory in the musical City of Angels, and her performance won critical acclaim. Other stage credits include: Fantine in Les Misérables; The Younger Woman in Stephen Sondheim's Putting It Together, which earned her a Drama Desk Award nomination; Norma Cassidy in Victor/Victoria, for which she won a Drama Desk Award; Marguerite in The Scarlet Pimpernel; Lili Vanessi/Katharine in Kiss Me, Kate; Reno Sweeney in Anything Goes; Ruth Sutton in Dessa Rose, earning another nomination for a Drama Desk Award; and Christine Colgate in Dirty Rotten Scoundrels.

York appeared as Guenevere in the National Tour of Camelot in the 2006–2007 season, for which she earned the Golden Icon Award from Travolta Family Entertainment for Best Actress in a Touring Production as well as the Carbonell Award. In 2008, she played Dixie Wilson in Turn of the Century at the Goodman Theater in Chicago. In 2009, she played Dolly Levi in the Reagle Music Theatre production of Hello, Dolly! in Waltham, Massachusetts and won an IRNE Award for her performance.

In 2010, York returned to the Reagle Music Theatre in its production of Into the Woods, where her performance as the Witch earned her another IRNE Award. That same year she played the Lady of the Lake in the Ogunquit Playhouse production of Spamalot.

In 2011, she starred as Billie Burke in the musical Ghostlight Off-Broadway at the Signature Theatre. She then played Anna in the 2011 Walnut Street Theatre production of The King and I.

She starred in the Encores! concert series production of Gentlemen Prefer Blondes as Dorothy Shaw, which earned rave reviews for her and the production, which ran May 9–13, 2012.

York played the role of Reno Sweeney in the national tour of the 2011 Roundabout Theatre Broadway revival of Anything Goes, which began October 2, 2012. For this role, she won the Helen Hayes Award for Outstanding Lead Actress in a Visiting Production. In February 2014, she played Young Belle in the Encores! concert of Little Me.

In May 2015, it was announced that York would appear in the musical Grey Gardens taking the role of Little Edie Bouvier Beale at Bay Street Theater in Sag Harbor, NY. She played the role of Morticia Addams in The Addams Family with 3D Theatricals later that year in Los Angeles.

She returned to Broadway in the musical Disaster!, which played from February to May 2016 at the Nederlander Theatre. In July 2016, York and her Bay Street Theater co-lead, Betty Buckley, reprised their Grey Gardens performance in a limited run at the Ahmanson Theater in Los Angeles.

York originated the role of Gynecia in the Broadway musical, Head Over Heels in 2018. She next appeared as Baroness Rodmilla de Ghent in Ever After The Musical. In October 2021, York once again played Reno Sweeney, this time in the London revival of Anything Goes at the Barbican Theatre.

=== Film ===
Her film credits include One Fine Day, Billy Bathgate, Dead Center, Second Honeymoon, Terror Tract, Au Pair II, and the television film Lucy in which she played Lucille Ball. Her performance in the London production of Kiss Me, Kate is available on DVD/video. She also played Lori, The Mystery Woman in Sasha Gordon's highly praised film It Had To Be You.

=== Television ===
She also has many credits in television, including appearances on Reba, Frasier, Arli$$, Spin City, The Naked Truth, Diagnosis: Murder, and also provides the voices of Bitty on Higglytown Heroes and Circe on Justice League Unlimited. In 2008, she also guest starred on an episode of Hannah Montana, playing Isis on the episode Yet Another Side of Me. York filmed for the TV series Power in 2015 and is featured in Episode 7 "You're Not the Man" as Tina Schulman. She was also guest starred in Frasier as Dinah or "Officer Nasty" in the episode "To Thine Old Self Be True" (Season 7, Episode 20). In 2017, she starred in The Mick, The Implant episode as Dr. Goodby.

=== Recording ===
York released her debut album Let's Fall in Love in early 2005, produced by Tor Hyams under the HyLo Entertainment label and was exclusively distributed by Barnes and Noble. She can also be heard on the cast recordings of City of Angels, Victor/Victoria, The Scarlet Pimpernel: Encore!, Dessa Rose, Putting It Together, Summer of '42, the soundtrack of Billy Bathgate, and recordings of Opal and Celebration of Life.

== Personal life ==
She married actor Ayal Miodovnik on July 20, 2010; the couple met while acting together in a stage production in 2003. Their daughter Olivia was born in 2011.

== Theater ==
Broadway

- City of Angels (1989) – Mallory Kingsley
- Victor/Victoria (1995) – Norma Cassidy
- The Scarlet Pimpernel (1998) – Marguerite
- Les Misérables (2000) – Fantine
- Sly Fox (2004) – Miss Fancy
- Dirty Rotten Scoundrels (2006) – Christine
- Disaster! (2016) – Jackie
- Head Over Heels (2018) – Gynecia

Off-Broadway

- Dessa Rose (2005) – Ruth
- Ghostlight (2011) – Billie Burke

West End/London

- Kiss Me, Kate (2002) – Lilli Vanessi/Kate
- Anything Goes (2021) - Reno Sweeney

National tours

- Kiss Me, Kate (2001) – Lilli Vanessi/Kate
- Camelot (2007) – Guenevere
- 101 Dalmatians Musical (2009) – Cruella de Vil
- Anything Goes (2012) – Reno Sweeney

Regional Theater Credits

- The Crucifer of Blood – Irene St. Claire
- Putting It Together – The Younger Woman
- Ragtime – Mother
- Hello Dolly! – Mrs. Dolly Gallagher Levi
- Into the Woods – The Witch
- Spamalot – The Lady of the Lake
- The King and I – Anna Leonowens
- The Addams Family – Morticia Addams
- Grey Gardens – Little Edie Bouvier Beale & Edith Bouvier Beale
- Ever After The Musical – Baroness Rodmilla de Ghent

Concerts

- The Sound of Music – Elsa Schraeder
- Gentlemen Prefer Blondes – Dorothy Shaw
- Little Me – Young Belle
- Anastasia - Countess Lily

== Filmography ==
=== Film ===
Year	Title	Role	Notes
1991	Billy Bathgate	Embassy Club Singer	
1992	Mad Dog Coll	Lotte	
1993	Dead Center	Mary	
1996	One Fine Day	Liza	
2000	Terror Tract	Sarah Freemont	Segment: "Nightmare"

=== Television ===
Year	Title	Role	Notes
1992	Bay City Story	Marci Fenner	Television film
1993	Taking the Heat	Susan	Television film
1997	Diagnosis: Murder	Randy Wolfe	Episode: "A Mime Is a Terrible Thing to Waste" / Unsold Pilot
2000	Frasier	Dinah	Episode: "To Thine Old Self Be True"
2001	Second Honeymoon	Gloria	Television film
2001	Au Pair II	Cassandra Hausen	Television film
2003	Great Performances	Lili Vanessi/Katherine	Episode: "Kiss Me, Kate"
2003	Lucy	Lucille Ball	Television film
2003	Eddie's Father	Lisa	Pilot
2004	Justice League Unlimited	Circe (voice)	Episode: "This Little Piggy"
2008	Hannah Montana	Isis	Episode: "Yet Another Side of Me"
2015, 2019	Power	Tina Schulman	2 episodes
2017	Elementary	Carla Giovanni	Episode: "Rekt in Real Life"
2017	The Mick	Dr. Goodby	Episode: "The Implant"
2017	Cradle Swapping	Mrs. Burnett	Television film
2020	Filthy Rich	Tina Sweet	Recurring role
2021	Prodigal Son	Birdie Milton	Episode: "Face Value"

=== Video games ===
- Neverwinter Nights 2 – Shandra Jerro

== Recordings ==
- City of Angels – 1990 Original Broadway Cast Recording
- Putting It Together – 1993 Original Off-Broadway Cast Recording
- Victor/Victoria – 1995 Original Broadway Cast Recording
- The Scarlet Pimpernel – 1998 Broadway Revival Cast Recording by Encore!
- Dessa Rose – 2005 Original Lincoln Center Cast Recording
- Summer of '42 – 2006 Cast Recording
- Disaster! – 2016 Original Broadway Cast Recording
- Opal, Honky Tonk Highway and Other Theatre Songs by Robert Nassif Lindsey
- Let's Fall in Love – Solo album released under HyLo Entertainment and produced by Tor Hyams
- Head over Heels - 2018 Original Broadway Cast Recording

== Awards ==
Year	Role and Production	Award	Result
1993	The Younger Woman in Putting It Together	Drama Desk Award	Nominated
1995	Norma Cassidy in Victor/Victoria	Drama Desk Award	Won
2005	Ruth Sutton in Dessa Rose	Drama Desk Award	Nominated
2007	Guenevere in Camelot	Golden Icon Award	Won
2007	Guenevere in Camelot	Carbonell Award	Won
2009	Dolly Levi in Hello, Dolly!	IRNE Award	Won
2010	The Witch in Into The Woods	IRNE Award	Won
2012	Reno Sweeney in Anything Goes	Helen Hayes Award	Won
