= Home: A Memoir of My Early Years =

2008 Julie Andrews Memoir

- Author: Julie Andrews
- Language: English
- Publisher: Hyperion
- Publication date: April 1, 2008
- Media type: Hardcover
- Pages: 352
- ISBN: 978-0-7868-6565-9
- OCLC: 191078415
- Dewey Decimal: 791.402/8092 B 22
- LC Class: PN2598.A65 A3 2008b

Home: A Memoir of My Early Years is a best-selling memoir written by Julie Andrews. It was published on April 1, 2008, by Hyperion.

Home tells the story of the life of Julie Andrews up until 1963, when she left England for Hollywood to shoot Mary Poppins and is part one of a two-part memoir, with the second part Home Work: A Memoir of My Hollywood Years, released over 11 years later in October 2019. While it includes dark childhood memories of surviving the London Blitz and attempts by her step-father Ted Andrews to molest her, the book overall presents a happy vision of Andrews's childhood. She has said in an interview that the book The Little Grey Men and her father Ted Wells were her inspirations and source of influence as an author, along with Charles Dickens, among others. Andrews revealed in the book that Wells was not, in fact, her natural father; her biological father had been a family friend with whom her mother had had a brief affair.

The book received a generally positive critical reception. The Los Angeles Times described it as "immensely readable" and The New York Times praised the quality of the prose. Home was #1 on the New York Times Best Seller list of non-fiction adult titles on April 27, 2008.
