= Leslie Bricusse =

English composer, lyricist and playwright (1931–2021)

Leslie Bricusse OBE
- Born: Leslie Charles Bricusse; 29 January 1931; Southfields, London, England
- Died: 19 October 2021 (aged 90) Saint-Paul-de-Vence, Alpes-Maritimes, France
- Occupations: Composer; lyricist; playwright
- Years active: 1952–2021
- Spouse: Yvonne Romain (m. 1958)

Leslie Charles Bricusse OBE (/ˈbrɪkəs/ BRIK-əss; 29 January 1931 – 19 October 2021) was a British composer, lyricist, and playwright who worked on theatre musicals and wrote theme music for films. He was best known for writing the music and lyrics for the films Doctor Dolittle; Goodbye, Mr. Chips; Scrooge; Willy Wonka & the Chocolate Factory; Tom and Jerry: The Movie; the titular James Bond film songs "Goldfinger" and "You Only Live Twice"; "Can You Read My Mind? (Love Theme from Superman)" (with John Williams) from Superman; and "Le Jazz Hot!" (with Henry Mancini) from Victor/Victoria.

== Early life and education ==
Bricusse was born in Southfields, London on 29 January 1931, the son of Annie Mary (née Mills) (Note: When Bricusse's parents were married, on 23 June 1923, his mother was a widow with the surname Vilander.) and Cedric Bricusse, who already had a daughter. His paternal grandfather was Belgian, whilst his mother's father came from Belfast in Northern Ireland. His father was employed by Kelmsley Newspapers for most of his working life. When Bricusse was two years old, his parents relocated to Pinner, Middlesex, (Note: Pinner is now in the London borough of Harrow) and he was educated at University College School, Hampstead.

After completing a two-year period of National Service with the Royal Army Service Corps, he studied Modern and Medieval Languages at Gonville and Caius College, Cambridge. He was secretary of Footlights in 1952–53, and president the following year. He also formed the Cambridge University Musical Comedy Club, and wrote the lyrics for its first production, Lady at the Wheel, in 1953. It was during his college drama career that Bricusse began working for Beatrice Lillie. After later starring in her stage show An Evening with Beatrice Lillie for a year, he decided to concentrate on writing rather than performing.

== Career ==
In the 1960s and 1970s, Bricusse enjoyed a fruitful partnership with Anthony Newley. They wrote the musical Stop the World – I Want to Get Off (1961), which was the basis of a 1966 film version and featured the Grammy-winning Song of the Year "What Kind of Fool Am I?" Also in collaboration with Newley, Bricusse wrote the show The Roar of the Greasepaint – The Smell of the Crowd (1965) and music for the film Willy Wonka & the Chocolate Factory (1971), based on the children's book Charlie and the Chocolate Factory by Roald Dahl. For the latter, they received an Academy Award nomination for Best Original Song Score. When he collaborated with Newley, the two men referred to themselves as "Brickman and Newburg" – nicknames which arose after an unsuccessful attempt to create a musical based on Ingmar Bergman's film comedy Smiles of a Summer Night. "Newburg" concentrated mainly on the music and "Brickman" on the lyrics, whilst Ian Fraser often did their arrangements.

Working solely as a lyricist, he collaborated with composer Cyril Ornadel on Pickwick (1963), based on Charles Dickens' The Pickwick Papers, a successful vehicle for Harry Secombe. His later collaborators included Henry Mancini (Victor/Victoria in 1982 and Tom and Jerry: The Movie in 1992) and John Williams (Home Alone in 1990 and Hook in 1991).

Bricusse composed the music and lyrics for the songs in the 1967 film Doctor Dolittle, which co-starred Newley, and also wrote its screenplay. Although the movie flopped at the box-office, "Talk to the Animals" earned him an Academy Award for Best Original Song. He also composed the songs for the film Goodbye, Mr. Chips (1969).

Sammy Davis Jr. had hits with two songs by Bricusse, "What Kind of Fool Am I?" (1962), from Stop the World - I Want to Get Off, and "The Candy Man" (1972), from Willy Wonka & the Chocolate Factory. In the United States, the latter release topped the Billboard Hot 100 singles chart for three weeks, and was the singer's biggest hit.

Other recording artists who recorded successful versions of his songs include Nina Simone ("Feeling Good"), Matt Monro and Frank Sinatra ("My Kind of Girl"), Shirley Bassey ("Goldfinger"), Harry Secombe ("If I Ruled the World"), Nancy Sinatra ("You Only Live Twice"), The Turtles ("A Guide for the Married Man"), Maureen McGovern ("Can You Read My Mind"), and Diana Krall ("When I Look in Your Eyes").

Bricusse partnered with George Tipton to write the opening theme of the American television sitcom It's a Living.

Pure Imagination: The World of Anthony Newley and Leslie Bricusse, devised and directed by Bruce Kimmel, opened at the Pacific Resident Theatre in Venice, California, on 7 December 2013. In 2015, it went to the St James Theatre, London.

Bricusse was inducted into the Songwriters Hall of Fame in 1989. On 29 October 2001, he was awarded the Order of the British Empire (OBE) for "services to the film industry and the theatre" from Queen Elizabeth II at a Buckingham Palace investiture ceremony.

In 2015, he released a memoir entitled Pure Imagination: A Sorta-Biography, with a foreword by Elton John.

== Personal life ==
Bricusse lived in California and in London, in an apartment overlooking the River Thames. He married actress Yvonne "Evie" Romain on 18 October 1958 at St James's Church, Marylebone. The couple's son, Adam Cedric (born 4 April 1964), pursued a career as an artist after studying fine art at Merton College, Oxford.

== Death ==
Bricusse died in his sleep in Saint-Paul-de-Vence, France, on 19 October 2021, aged 90. In 2024, his wife donated his papers, including 225 notebooks, to the Library of Congress.

== Works ==
=== Musicals ===
- Stop the World – I Want to Get Off (with Anthony Newley) (1961) – includes "Once in a Lifetime" and "What Kind of Fool Am I?"
- Pickwick – with Cyril Ornadel (1963)
- The Roar of the Greasepaint – The Smell of the Crowd (with Newley) (1965) – includes "Who Can I Turn to (When Nobody Needs Me)?" and "Feeling Good"
- Doctor Dolittle (1967) – includes "Talk to the Animals"
- Sweet November (with Newley) (1968)
- Goodbye, Mr. Chips (1969)
- Scrooge (with Ian Fraser; Herbert W. Spencer, 1970) – includes "Thank You Very Much"
- Willy Wonka & the Chocolate Factory (with Newley, 1971) - includes "Pure Imagination" and "The Candy Man"
- Beyond the Rainbow (lyrics only, 1978)
- The Good Old Bad Old Days (with Newley, 1974)
- Peter Pan (television, with Newley, 1976)
- Say Hello to Harvey (1981 stage musical)
- Victor Victoria (film with Henry Mancini, 1982)
- Babes in Toyland (1986 film) (1986)
- Sherlock Holmes: The Musical – book, music, and lyrics by Bricusse (1989)
- Hook (with John Williams) (1991) – includes "When You're Alone"
- Jekyll & Hyde (lyrics only, 1990/1994/1997)
- Scrooge (1992 stage musical)
- Victor/Victoria (1995 Broadway musical)
- Doctor Dolittle (1998 stage musical)
- Cyrano (2009, Tokyo, with Frank Wildhorn)
- Sammy (2009) – Old Globe Theatre

=== Songs ===
- "Out of Town" with Robin Beaumont (1956)
- "My Kind of Girl" (1961)
- "What Kind of Fool Am I?" with Anthony Newley (1963)
- "Who Can I Turn To" with Anthony Newley (1964)
- "Feeling Good" with Anthony Newley (1964)
- "Goldfinger" (with John Barry and Anthony Newley) from Goldfinger (1964)
- "A Guide for the Married Man" (with John Williams) from the film A Guide for the Married Man (1967)
- "You Only Live Twice" (with Barry) from You Only Live Twice (1967)
- "Two for the Road" (with Henry Mancini) from Two for the Road (1967)
- "Talk to the Animals" from Doctor Dolittle (1967)
- "Your Zowie Face" for film In Like Flint, music by Jerry Goldsmith (1967)
- "Fill the World With Love" from Goodbye Mr. Chips (1969) originally sung by Petula Clark and also popularised by Richard Harris
- "You and I" from Goodbye Mr. Chips (1968) sung by Petula Clark, Barbara Cook, and Michael Feinstein
- "Thank You Very Much" from Scrooge (1970)
- "Candy Man" and "Pure Imagination" (with Newley) from Willy Wonka & the Chocolate Factory (1971)
- "Can You Read My Mind (Love Theme)" (with John Williams) from Superman (1978)
- "Move Em Out" (with Henry Mancini) from Revenge of the Pink Panther (1978)
- "Le Jazz Hot!" with Henry Mancini from Victor/Victoria (1982)
- "Making Toys", "Every Christmas Eve/Santa's Theme (Giving)", "It's Christmas Again", "Patch! Natch!" and "Thank You, Santa!" (with Henry Mancini) from Santa Claus: The Movie (1985)
- "Life in a Looking Glass" (with Henry Mancini) from That's Life! (1986)
- "Somewhere in My Memory", "Star of Bethlehem" from Home Alone (with John Williams) (1990)
- "When You're Alone", "Pick 'Em Up", "We Don't Wanna Grow Up" from Hook (with John Williams) (1991)
- "Merry Christmas, Merry Christmas", "Christmas Star" (with John Williams) in Home Alone 2: Lost in New York.
- "The Perfect Song" (with Andrew Lloyd Webber) for Michael Ball
- "Grandma's Lullaby", "Who Needs You?" and "It Takes All Sorts" in The Land Before Time IV: Journey Through the Mists (1996)

=== Awards ===
- Academy Awards
  - Best Original Song, 1968 – "Talk to the Animals" from Doctor Dolittle
  - Best Original Song Score and Its Adaptation or Adaptation Score, 1982 - Victor/Victoria
- Grammy Awards
  - Song of the Year, 1963 – "What Kind of Fool Am I"
- Songwriters Hall of Fame

==== Nominations ====
- Tony Awards
  - Best Musical, 1963 – Stop the World – I Want to Get Off
  - Best Score, 1963 – "Stop the World – I Want to Get Off"
  - Best Score of a Musical, 1963 – "Stop the World – I Want to Get Off"
  - Best Score of a Musical, 1965 – "The Roar of Greasepaint – The Smell of the Crowd"
  - Best Book of a Musical, 1997 – "Jekyll & Hyde"
- Academy Awards
  - Best Scoring of Music, Adaptation or Treatment, 1967 – Doctor Dolittle
  - Best Score of a Musical Picture (Original or Adaptation), 1969 – Goodbye, Mr. Chips
  - Best Original Song Score, 1970 – Scrooge
  - Best Original Song, 1970 – "Thank You Very Much" from Scrooge
  - Best Adaptation and Original Song Score, 1971 – Willy Wonka & the Chocolate Factory'
  - Best Original Song, 1986 – "Life in a Looking Glass" from That's Life!
  - Best Original Song, 1990 – "Somewhere in My Memory" from Home Alone
  - Best Original Song, 1991 – "When You're Alone" from Hook
- Golden Raspberry Award
  - Worst 'Original' Song, 1986 – "Life in a Looking Glass" (lyrics) from That's Life!
