= Duet for One =

1986 film by Andrei Konchalovsky

- Theatrical release poster
- Directed by: Andrei Konchalovsky
- Written by: Tom Kempinski (play and screenplay)
- Produced by: Menahem Golan; Yoram Globus
- Starring: Julie Andrews; Alan Bates; Max von Sydow; Rupert Everett
- Cinematography: Alex Thomson
- Edited by: Henry Richardson
- Music by: Michael Bishop
- Production company: Golan-Globus Productions Ltd.
- Distributed by: Cannon Film Distributors (through Columbia-Cannon-Warner Distributors)
- Release date: 25 December 1986
- Running time: 107 minutes
- Country: United Kingdom
- Language: English
- Box office: $8,736

Duet for One is a 1986 British drama film adapted from the play, a two-hander by Tom Kempinski, about a world-famous concert violinist named Stephanie Anderson who is suddenly struck with multiple sclerosis. It is set in London, and directed by Andrei Konchalovsky. The story was, at the time of the premiere of the play, assumed to be based on the life of cellist Jacqueline du Pré, who was diagnosed with MS, and her husband, conductor Daniel Barenboim, but Kempinski has stated that the subject of the play was a cathartic explosion of his own anxieties and depression.

== Synopsis ==
Stephanie Anderson, a world-famous violinist, becomes unable to play because of multiple sclerosis. A depressed psychiatrist she sees is unable to help with her rage and frustration. Her star pupil, realizing he will learn nothing more, leaves her. Her husband departs with his young secretary, and her accompanist dies. Her fierce desire to be alone in her pain alienates everybody except her faithful maid. She gives all her musical effects to a totter (an itinerant scrap merchant), who she asks into her bed as well. Watching a videotape of a concert triumph, she takes an overdose but the maid breaks in to try and save her. In an epilogue, which may be a dream, the psychiatrist has become a friend while her ex-husband and former pupil come back to see her, as does the ghost of her accompanist.

== Primary cast ==
- Julie Andrews: Stephanie Anderson
- Alan Bates: David Cornwallis
- Max von Sydow: Dr. Louis Feldman
- Rupert Everett: Constantine Kassanis
- Margaret Courtenay: Sonia Randvich
- Cathryn Harrison: Penny Smallwood
- Sigfrit Steiner: Leonid Lefimov
- Macha Méril: Anya
- Liam Neeson: Totter
- Siobhan Redmond: Totter's wife
- Paula Figgett: Totter's Daughter

== Reception ==
The film gained positive reviews.

== Awards ==
Golden Globe for Best Actress in a Drama Role: Julie Andrews (Nominated)

== Stage play ==
Duet for One premiered at the Bush Theatre in 1980 with Frances de la Tour and David de Keyser in the leading roles. Kempinski and de la Tour were married at the time, and he wrote the role with her in mind. It had a successful run in the West End. The Broadway version, starring Anne Bancroft and Max von Sydow, opened 17 December 1981, and ran until 2 January 1982, for a total of 20 performances. A major revival was staged by the Almeida Theatre in 2009, starring Juliet Stevenson and Henry Goodman. This revival too was lauded by the critics, and it subsequently transferred to the Vaudeville Theatre in the West End.

In 2023 a new production was staged at the Orange Tree Theatre, in the production the gender of Dr. Feldman was switched. Actress Maureen Beattie played the psychiatrist with Tara Fitzgerald as Stephanie.
