= Victor/Victoria (musical) =

1995 musical

- Original Broadway Poster
- Music: Henry Mancini; Frank Wildhorn
- Lyrics: Leslie Bricusse; Frank Wildhorn
- Book: Blake Edwards
- Basis: 1982 film Victor/Victoria
- Productions: 1995 Minneapolis (tryout); 1995 Chicago (tryout); 1995 Broadway; 1998 National Tour; 2001 São Paulo, Brazil; 2003 Stockholm; 2005 Madrid; 2006 Buenos Aires; 2006 Mexico City; 2010 Vienna; 2012 London; 2014 Belgrade; 2026 Rio de Janeiro, Brazil

Victor/Victoria is a musical with a book by Blake Edwards, music by Henry Mancini, lyrics by Leslie Bricusse and additional musical material (music and lyrics) by Frank Wildhorn. It is based on the 1982 film of the same name, which was a remake of the German film comedy Viktor und Viktoria shot by Reinhold Schünzel in 1933 from his own script.

Mancini died before he could complete the music, and Wildhorn was brought in to finish the score. The original 1995 Broadway production created mild controversy when actress Julie Andrews, feeling that the rest of the show had been overlooked, declined her (and the show's only) Tony Award nomination.

== Synopsis ==
=== Act 1 ===
Carroll "Toddy" Todd is tenuously employed as the resident performer at Henri Labisse's Left Bank gay club, Chez Lui. Toddy and Les Boys entertain the small but appreciative audience (Paris By Night). Toddy insults a group of customers which includes his ex-boyfriend Richard. Labisse threatens to fire him. A penniless English soprano, Victoria Grant, auditions unsuccessfully for Labisse. Toddy tries to help, but Labisse rejects her and fires him. Toddy befriends Victoria, and offers her shelter from the wet wintry night in his tiny apartment. They become instant buddies and confidantes. Toddy wishes he were a woman, like Victoria, while Victoria believes that there are far more advantages to being a man (If I Were a Man).

Richard, the ex-boyfriend, arrives at Toddy's unexpectedly to collect his things. Victoria is by now wearing his hat and pajamas. Richard mistakenly thinks she is Toddy's new boyfriend and insults Toddy. Victoria punches Richard and kicks him out. Seeing that Richard believed Victoria to be a man, Toddy is struck by inspiration: Victoria could gain fame by disguising herself as a male female impersonator. Over Victoria's objections, he dreams up the persona of Count Victor Grazinsky – a gay Polish aristocrat and Toddy's new lover (Trust Me). Toddy drags the reluctant Victoria to meet Andre Cassell, Paris's leading impresario, who is dubious about "Count Victor Grazinsky" until he hears "him" hit a glass-shattering high G-flat. "Victor" is in business.

Le Jazz Hot! introduces Victor to Paris café society. His show-stopping performance at once makes him the toast of Gay Paree. The only doubter of Victor's authenticity is a dashing American nightclub owner, King Marchan, visiting Paris with his brassy girlfriend Norma and his loyal bodyguard Squash. Norma mocks King for being attracted to a male impersonator, but King is determined to prove Victor is a woman. At Cassell's opening night party for Victor, King invites Victor to tango with Norma, hoping to prove his point (The Tango), but Victoria successfully avoids detection.

By an unwelcome coincidence, King and Norma and Squash find themselves in the adjoining hotel suite to the newly successful Toddy and Victor. Norma tries to seduce King (Paris Makes Me Horny) but she succeeds only in making him impotent. Next door, Victoria bemoans to Toddy that in King she thinks she has finally found the man of her dreams, but here she is trying to convince him that she is a man, too. (Crazy World).

=== Act 2 ===
Victor continues to take Paris audiences by storm (Louis Says). Norma complains to Victor and Toddy that King is shipping her back to Chicago because he fancies Victor. King confronts his doubts about himself and Victor (King's Dilemma). He invites Victor and Toddy to dinner to try and find out. After dinner they visit Chez Lui, where Labisse also has his suspicions that Victor is a woman. He invites her/him to sing. Victor and Toddy oblige (You and Me). Richard's group arrives noisily in mid-song. Victor trips Richard and starts a major brawl in the club. The police arrive to break it up. Outside the club, King says he doesn't care if Victor is a man, and kisses him. Victoria admits she's not a man. King says he still doesn't care, and kisses her again (Paris By Night (Reprise)).

Back in the hotel, Squash barges into King's bedroom and finds King and Victor in bed together: He apologizes profusely. King tries to explain. Squash admires King for coming out of the closet, and stuns his boss by revealing that he, too, is gay. Victor and King examine their potential problems if they are perceived publicly as two men. It won't work. (Almost a Love Song).

Back in Chicago, Norma is performing in a night club (Chicago, Illinois). She informs King's gangster partner, Sal Andretti, that King has dumped her for another man – and is living with "a gay Polish fairy." Sal is aghast, and says they're all going to Europe. Two weeks later, Toddy and Squash have become happy partners. Not so for King and Victoria, unable to be seen together in public (Living in the Shadows). Victoria tells Toddy she doesn't want to be a man anymore. Toddy understands. Neither does he. Sal and the spurned Norma arrive in Paris. King admits he loves "Victor", keeping the secret. Sal, disgusted, ends their business relationship. Victoria reveals herself to Norma as a woman. Norma is horrified. Labisse witnesses this moment of naked truth. Victoria is horrified. Toddy tells her not to worry. "Trust me!" Dissolve to Victor's farewell appearance (Victor/Victoria). Labisse tries to expose him/her as a fraud. Toddy, thrilled to be back in drag, replaces Victoria in a blink, to thwart Labisse and leave the way clear for a happy ending for our two loving couples -King and Victoria, and Toddy and Squash.

== Production history ==
A stage musical of the film was mooted after the movie's release. Robert Preston and Julie Andrews were meant to reprise their respective roles but then Preston pulled out saying there was no way the musical could be profitable. "It's just this big ego trip for Blake", he said.

Victor/Victoria premiered in out-of-town tryout at the Orpheum Theatre in Minneapolis, Minnesota in June 1995. Another tryout was held at the Shubert Theatre in Chicago, Illinois from July to September 1995. The musical opened on Broadway at the Marquis Theatre on October 25, 1995 and closed on July 27, 1997 after 734 performances and 25 previews. The show was directed by Edwards and choreographed by Rob Marshall. The original cast included Julie Andrews, Tony Roberts, Michael Nouri, Rachel York, Richard B. Shull, and Greg Jbara.

When Andrews received the lone Tony Award nomination for the production, she made headlines when she rejected the honor with the statement, "I have searched my conscience and my heart and find that I cannot accept this nomination." Andrews further stated that she would "stand instead with the egregiously overlooked" cast and crew. The incident stimulated ticket sales for the musical, and Andrews declined to perform at the Tony Awards ceremony, which suffered that year from a lack of star wattage.

During Andrews' four-week vacation in early 1997, Liza Minnelli took over the role. Later Andrews, who boasted a four-octave vocal range, was forced to quit the show permanently when she developed vocal problems. She subsequently underwent surgery to relieve strain on her vocal cords and was left without a singing voice. Her lawsuit against surgeon Scott M. Kessler was settled for $20 million. Andrews was succeeded by Raquel Welch for the duration of the run.

A filmed performance was broadcast on television in 1995 and is available on DVD.

A US national tour ran from September 1998 through June 1999, starring Toni Tennille, Jamie Ross, Dennis Cole, Dana Lynn Mauro and A.J. Irvin.

Anna Francolini played the lead role in a 2012 small-scale production at the Southwark Playhouse in London.

== Songs ==
Act I

- Paris by Night – Toddy & Les Boys
- If I Were a Man – Victoria
- Trust Me (music by Frank Wildhorn) – Toddy & Victoria
- Le Jazz Hot! – Victor and Ensemble
- The Tango – Victor & Norma
- Paris Makes Me Horny – Norma
- Crazy World † – Victoria

Act II

- Louis Says (music by Wildhorn) †† – Victor & Ensemble
- King's Dilemma – King
- Apache – Les Boys
- You & Me – Toddy and Victor
- Paris by Night (Reprise) – Street Singer
- Almost a Love Song – King and Victoria
- Chicago, Illinois – Norma & The Girls
- Living in the Shadows (music by Wildhorn) ††† – Victoria
- Victor/Victoria – Victoria, Toddy & Company

† Replaced by "Who Can I Tell?" (music and lyrics by Bricusse) during Liza Minnelli's run

†† Cut early in the run of the show

††† Briefly replaced by "I Guess It's Time" (music by Mancini and lyrics by Bricusse) during Raquel Welch's run, but restored before her opening night

== Awards and nominations ==
=== Original Broadway production ===
Year	Award	Category	Nominee	Result
1996	Tony Award	Best Actress in a Musical	Julie Andrews	Nominated, No Declined
1996	Drama Desk Award	Outstanding Actress in a Musical	Julie Andrews	Won
1996	Drama Desk Award	Outstanding Featured Actress in a Musical	Rachel York	Won
1996	Drama Desk Award	Outstanding Set Design	Robin Wagner	Nominated
