= Julie Andrews =

English actress, singer and author (born 1935)

Dame Julie Andrews DBE
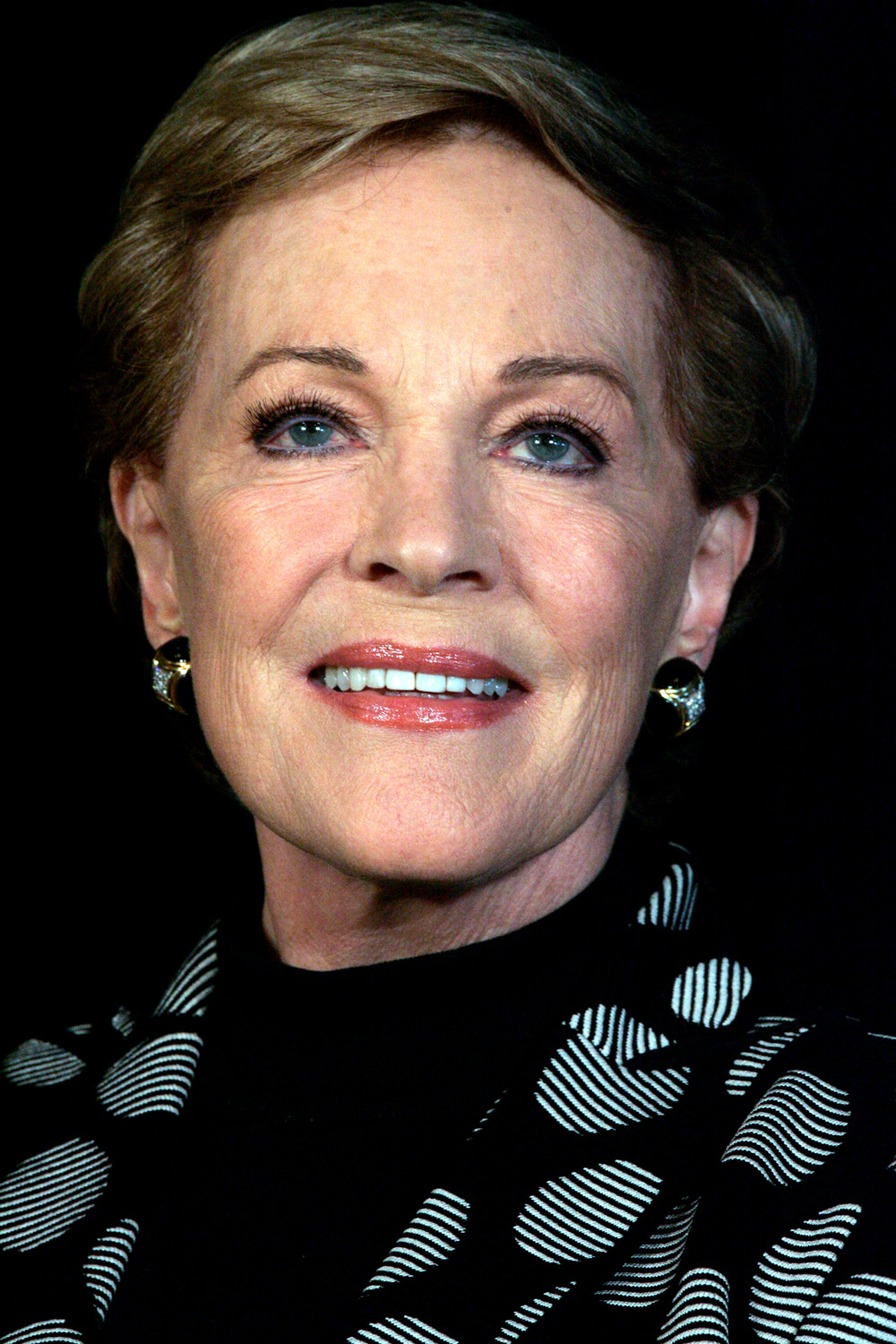
- Andrews in 2013
- Born: Julia Elizabeth Wells; 1 October 1935 (age 91); Walton-on-Thames, Surrey, England
- Occupations: Actress; singer; author; theater director
- Years active: 1945–present
- Works: Full list
- Spouses: Tony Walton (m. 1959; div. 1968); Blake Edwards (m. 1969; died 2010)
- Children: 3, including Emma Walton Hamilton
- Awards: Full list

Dame Julie Andrews (born Julia Elizabeth Wells, 1 October 1935) is an English actress, singer, author and theatre director. Her accolades include an Academy Award, a British Academy Film Award, two Grammy Awards, four Emmy Awards, seven Golden Globe Awards and nominations for three Tony Awards. One of the biggest box office draws of the 1960s, Andrews has been honoured with the Kennedy Center Honors in 2001, the Screen Actors Guild Life Achievement Award in 2007, and the AFI Life Achievement Award in 2022. She was made a Dame (DBE) by Queen Elizabeth II in the 2000 New Year Honours.

A child actress and singer, Andrews appeared in the West End in 1948 and from 1950 to 1952 on the radio programme "Educating Archie". She made her Broadway debut in The Boy Friend (1954). Billed as "Britain's youngest prima donna", she rose to prominence in Broadway musicals starring as Eliza Doolittle in My Fair Lady (1956) and Queen Guinevere in Camelot (1960). She also starred in the Rodgers and Hammerstein television musical Cinderella (1957). She made her film debut playing Mary Poppins in Walt Disney's Mary Poppins (1964) and won the Academy Award for Best Actress. The following year, she starred in the musical film The Sound of Music (1965), playing Maria von Trapp and winning the Golden Globe Award for Best Actress – Motion Picture Comedy or Musical.

Andrews starred in various films, working with directors including her husband Blake Edwards, George Roy Hill, and Alfred Hitchcock. Films she starred in include The Americanization of Emily (1964), Hawaii (1966), Torn Curtain (1966), Thoroughly Modern Millie (1967), Star! (1968), The Tamarind Seed (1974), 10 (1979), S.O.B. (1981), Victor/Victoria (1982), That's Life! (1986), and Duet for One (1986). She later returned to films, acting in The Princess Diaries (2001), The Princess Diaries 2: Royal Engagement (2004), as well as Eloise at the Plaza and Eloise at Christmastime (both 2003). She also has voiced roles in the Shrek franchise (2001–2010) and the Despicable Me franchise (2010–present).

Andrews is also known for her collaborations with Carol Burnett, including television specials in 1962, 1971, and 1989. She starred in her variety special, The Julie Andrews Hour (1973), for which she received the Primetime Emmy Award. She co-created and hosted Julie's Greenroom (2008, 2017), and voiced Lady Whistledown in the Netflix series Bridgerton (2020–present). Andrews has co-authored numerous children's books with her daughter and two autobiographies, Home: A Memoir of My Early Years (2008) and Home Work: A Memoir of My Hollywood Years (2019).

== Early life ==
Julia Elizabeth Wells was born on 1 October 1935 in Walton-on-Thames, Surrey, England. Her mother, Barbara Ward Wells (née Morris; 25 July 1910–1984) was born in Chertsey and married Edward Charles "Ted" Wells (1908–1990), a teacher of metalwork and woodwork, in 1932. Andrews was conceived as a result of an affair her mother had with a family friend. Andrews learned of her true parentage from her mother when she was around 15, although it was not publicly disclosed until her 2008 autobiography.

With the outbreak of World War II, her parents went their separate ways and were soon divorced. Each remarried: Barbara to Ted Andrews, in 1943, and Ted Wells in 1944 to Winifred Maud (Hyde) Birkhead, a war widow and former hairstylist at a war work factory that employed them both in Hinchley Wood, Surrey. Wells assisted with evacuating children to Surrey during the Blitz, while Andrews's mother joined her husband in entertaining the troops through the Entertainments National Service Association. Andrews lived briefly with Wells and her brother, John, in Surrey.

In 1940, Wells sent her to live with her mother and stepfather, who Wells thought would be better able to provide for his talented daughter's artistic training. While Andrews had been used to calling her stepfather "Uncle Ted", her mother suggested it would be more appropriate to refer to her stepfather as "Pop", while her father remained "Dad" or "Daddy" to her, a change which she disliked. The Andrews family was "very poor" and "lived in a bad slum area of London" at the time, stating that the war "was a very black period in my life." According to Andrews, her stepfather was violent and an alcoholic. He twice tried to get into bed with his stepdaughter while drunk, resulting in Andrews fitting a lock on her door.

As the stage career of her mother and stepfather improved, they were able to afford better surroundings, first to Beckenham and then, as the war ended, back to the Andrews' hometown of Hersham. The family took up residence at the Old Meuse, in West Grove, Hersham, a house (since demolished) where Andrews's maternal grandmother had served as a maid. Andrews's stepfather sponsored lessons for her, first at the independent arts educational school Cone-Ripman School (previously ArtsEd, now Tring Park School for the Performing Arts) and thereafter with concert soprano and voice instructor Madame Lilian Stiles-Allen.

Andrews said of Stiles-Allen, "She had an enormous influence on me", adding, "She was my third mother – I've got more mothers and fathers than anyone in the world". In her memoir Julie Andrews – My Star Pupil, Stiles-Allen records, "The range, accuracy and tone of Julie's voice amazed me ... she had possessed the rare gift of absolute pitch", though Andrews herself denies this in her 2008 autobiography Home. According to Andrews, "Madame was sure that I could do Mozart and Rossini, but, to be honest, I never was". Of her own voice, she says, "I had a very pure, white, thin voice, a four-octave range – dogs would come from miles around." After Cone-Ripman School, Andrews continued her academic education at the nearby Woodbrook School, a local state school in Beckenham.

Andrews was also trained in dance, learning from both a professional studio and her aunt's school, where she studied ballet, ballroom, and tap. This early training gave her strong stage movement and rhythm, which later supported her work in musical theatre and film.

== Career ==
=== 1945–1953: Early career ===
Beginning in 1945, and for the next two years, Andrews performed spontaneously and unbilled on stage with her parents. "Then came the day when I was told I must go to bed in the afternoon because I was going to be allowed to sing with Mummy and Pop in the evening", Andrews explained. During her initial shows, Andrews stood on a beer crate to sing into the microphone, performing a solo or a duet with her stepfather, while her mother played piano. She later stated that "it must have been ghastly, but it seemed to go down all right". Fellow child entertainer Petula Clark, three years her senior, recalled touring around the UK by train to sing for the troops alongside Andrews; they slept in the luggage racks. Clark later said "It was fun—and not a lot of kids were having fun".

Andrews had her career breakthrough when her stepfather introduced her to managing director Val Parnell, whose Moss Empires controlled prominent performance venues in London. At the age of 12, Andrews made her professional solo debut at the London Hippodrome, singing the difficult aria "Je suis Titania" from Mignon as part of a musical revue, called "Starlight Roof", on 22 October 1947. She played at the Hippodrome for one year. Of her role in "Starlight Roof", Andrews recalled: "There was this wonderful American person and comedian, Wally Boag, who made balloon animals. He would say, 'Is there any little girl or boy in the audience who would like one of these?' And I would rush up onstage and say, 'I'd like one, please.' And then he would chat to me and I'd tell him I sang. ... I was fortunate in that I absolutely stopped the show cold. I mean, the audience went crazy."

On 1 November 1948, a thirteen-year-old Andrews became the youngest solo performer ever to be seen in a Royal Variety Performance before King George VI and Queen Elizabeth at the London Palladium. Andrews performed alongside singer Danny Kaye, dancers the Nicholas Brothers, and the comedy team George and Bert Bernard.

Andrews subsequently followed her parents into radio and television. She performed in musical interludes of the BBC Light Programme comedy show Up the Pole and was a cast member in Educating Archie, from 1950 to 1952. She reportedly made her television début on the BBC programme RadiOlympia Showtime on 8 October 1949. Andrews appeared on West End theatre at the London Casino, where she played one year each as Princess Badroulbadour in Aladdin and the egg in Humpty Dumpty. Andrews also appeared on provincial stages in Jack and the Beanstalk and Little Red Riding Hood, as well as starring as the lead role in Cinderella. In 1952, she voiced Princess Zeila in the English dub of the Italian animated movie La Rosa di Bagdad (renamed The Singing Princess), in her first film and first venture into voice-over work.

=== 1954–1962: Broadway, My Fair Lady and television ventures ===
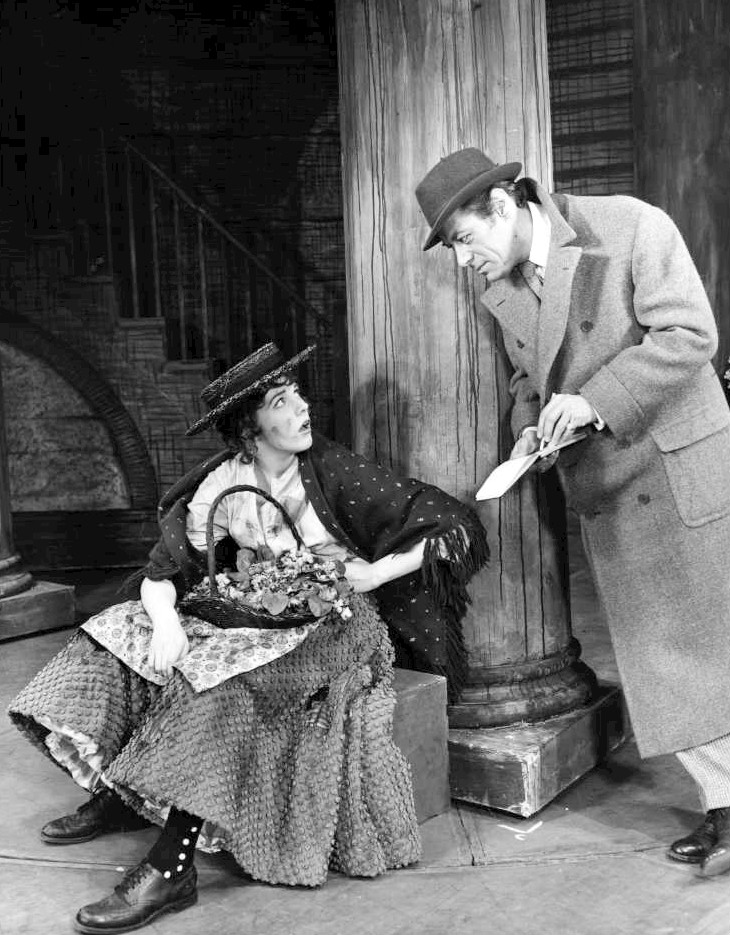
Andrews as Eliza Doolittle meets Rex Harrison as Professor Henry Higgins in My Fair Lady, the musical adaptation of Pygmalion.

On 30 September 1954, the eve of her 19th birthday, Andrews made her Broadway debut as Polly Browne in the London musical The Boy Friend. Andrews was recommended to director Vida Hope for the part by actress Hattie Jacques, whom Andrews regards as a "catalyst" for her career. Eve Benda recognised her special talent and predicted her stardom. Andrews was anxious about moving to New York; at the time, she was both breadwinner and caretaker for her family, and took the part upon her father's encouragement. Andrews stated that at the time, she had "no idea" how to research a role or study a script, and cites Cy Feuer's direction as being "phenomenal". The Boy Friend became a hit, with Andrews receiving praise; critics called her the stand-out of the show. In 1955, Andrews accepted a role opposite Bing Crosby in the television film, High Tor, which was filmed in November of the same year. This was Andrews's first screen project, which she described as "daunting". High Tor was televised the following March before a live audience for the Ford Star Jubilee, receiving lukewarm reviews.

Near the end of her one-year run with The Boy Friend, Andrews was approached to audition to Alan Jay Lerner and Frederick Loewe for the role of Eliza Doolittle in My Fair Lady. She was offered the part during her third reading. She later wrote that she felt she could "be Eliza, could find and understand her" if only someone were to "gently unravel the knotted ... string inside my stomach". During rehearsals, director Moss Hart spent forty-eight consecutive hours solely with Andrews, where they "hammered through each scene"; Andrews later stated that "the good man had stripped [her] feelings bare ... moulded, kneaded, and helped [her] become the character of Eliza ... [and made] her part of [her] soul". Andrews referred to it as the best acting lesson she had ever received, later cementing the role with her "own touches and flourishes" and continuing to work on the character throughout her two-year run. On 15 March 1956, My Fair Lady opened on Broadway at the Mark Hellinger Theatre. The play was a huge success with both the audience and critics, though soon after opening she learned she needed to tone down her learned cockney accent so that the American audience could understand her, a change which was reversed at the West End performance a year later. Andrews describes her performances as Eliza as "the great learning period" of her life.

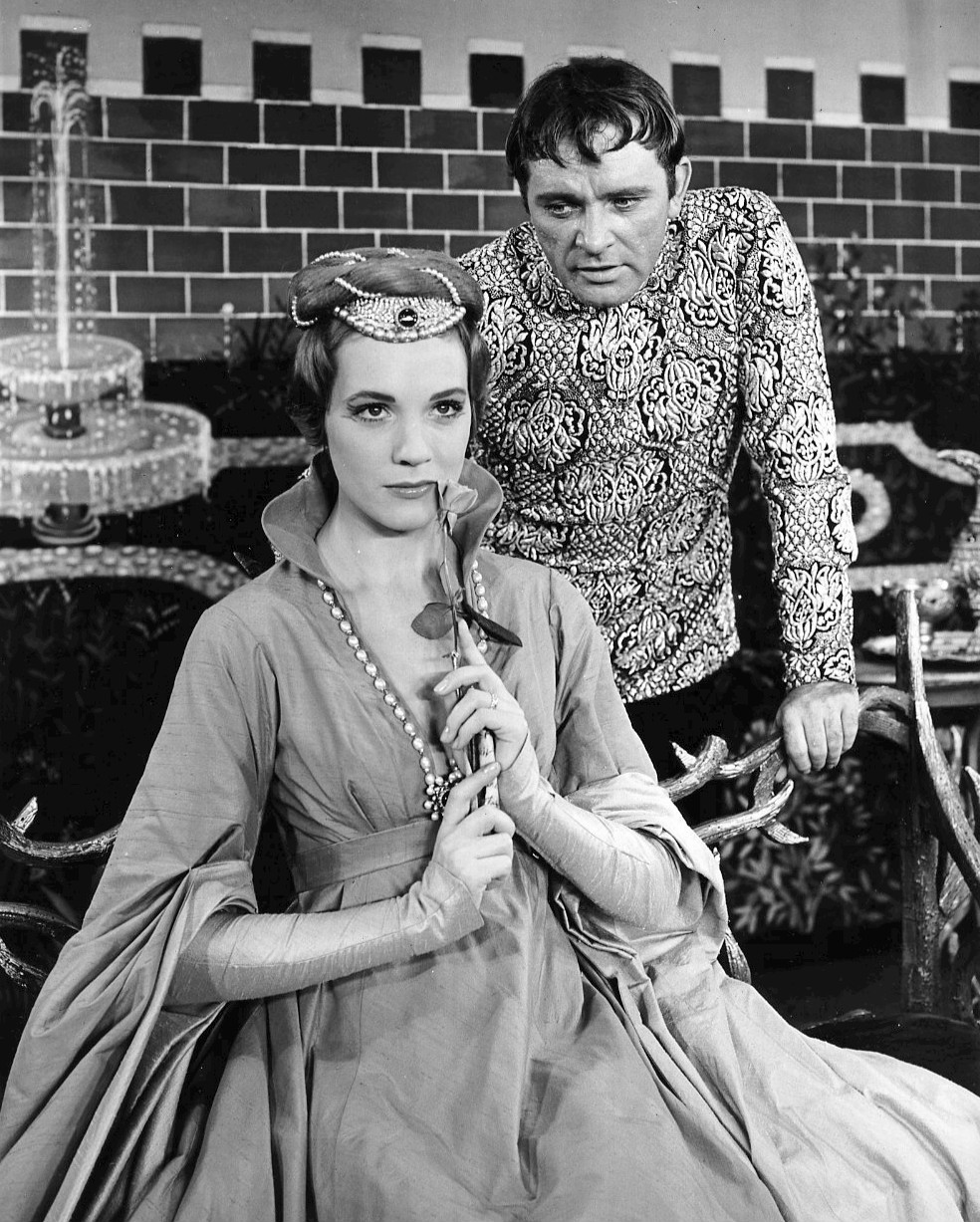
Andrews as Queen Guinevere with Richard Burton as King Arthur in the musical Camelot

Richard Rodgers was so impressed with Andrews's talent that concurrent with her run in My Fair Lady she was featured in the Rodgers and Hammerstein television musical Cinderella, which was written especially for her. Cinderella was broadcast live on CBS on 31 March 1957 under the musical direction of Alfredo Antonini and had an estimated 107 million viewers. The show was broadcast live in colour from CBS Studio 72, at Broadway and 81st Street in New York: CBS' only East Coast colour studio. Andrews was nominated for an Emmy Award for her role. She described the performance as "incredibly hard" and stated it took her "years to realise the enormity" of the production. In 1957, Andrews released her debut solo album, The Lass with the Delicate Air, which harked back to her British music hall days. The album includes performances of English folk songs as well as the World War II anthem, "London Pride", a patriotic song written by Noël Coward in 1941 during the Blitz, which Andrews herself had survived.

Between 1956 and 1962, Andrews guest-starred on The Ed Sullivan Show (15 July 1956), and also appeared on The Dinah Shore Chevy Show, What's My Line?, The Jack Benny Program, The Bell Telephone Hour, and The Garry Moore Show. In June 1962, Andrews co-starred in Julie and Carol at Carnegie Hall, a CBS special with Carol Burnett. In 1960, Lerner and Loewe again cast her in a period musical as Queen Guinevere in Camelot, along with Richard Burton (as King Arthur) and newcomer Robert Goulet. Andrews called the work "monumental" due to the heavy set costuming and detailed literary themes. Camelot premiered at the Majestic Theatre to "adequate" reviews, which Andrews credited to off-set production issues and comparisons to My Fair Lady. The musical was substantially revised both before and during the show's Broadway run.

Casting for the film adaptation of My Fair Lady began in 1962; Alan Jay Lerner hoped for Andrews to reprise her role, but Warner Brothers studio head Jack Warner decided Andrews lacked sufficient name recognition; the part was played by the established film actress Audrey Hepburn, with the bulk of the singing dubbed by Marni Nixon. As Warner later recalled that the decision was made for financial purposes, stating, "In my business, I have to know who brings people and their money to a cinema box office. Audrey Hepburn had never made a financial flop." Andrews later reflected that she understood her experience on Broadway "was within a very small pond" but wished she had been able to record her performance for posterity.

=== 1963–1967: Mary Poppins and film stardom ===
In 1963, Andrews began work in the titular role of Disney's musical film Mary Poppins. Walt Disney had seen her performance in Camelot and subsequently offered her the role; Andrews initially declined because of pregnancy, returning to London to give birth, but Disney firmly insisted, saying, "We'll wait for you." After the birth of her daughter, she received a call from P. L. Travers, author of the Mary Poppins book series, who told her, "Well, you're much too pretty of course. But you've got the nose for it." Disney rented a house in Toluca Lake, Los Angeles, for her family to reside in during production. Andrews relied largely on instinct for her portrayal, conceptualising her background and giving the character a "particular walk" and a turned-out stance to suit her ladylike sensibility. Andrews referred to production as "unrelenting" given the physical exertion and technical details, saying that she "could not have asked" for a better introduction to film.

Mary Poppins became the biggest box-office draw in Disney history. Variety lauded Andrews's performance as a "signal triumph. ... She performs as easily as she sings, displaying a fresh type of beauty". The film was nominated for thirteen Academy Awards and won five, including the Academy Award for Best Actress for Andrews's performance. She also received the Golden Globe Award for Best Actress – Motion Picture Comedy or Musical, while Andrews and her co-stars won the 1965 Grammy Award for Best Album for Children. As a measure of "sweet revenge", as Poppins songwriter Richard M. Sherman put it, Andrews closed her acceptance speech at the Golden Globes by saying, "And, finally, my thanks to a man who made a wonderful movie and who made all this possible in the first place, Mr. Jack Warner." My Fair Lady was in direct competition for the awards.

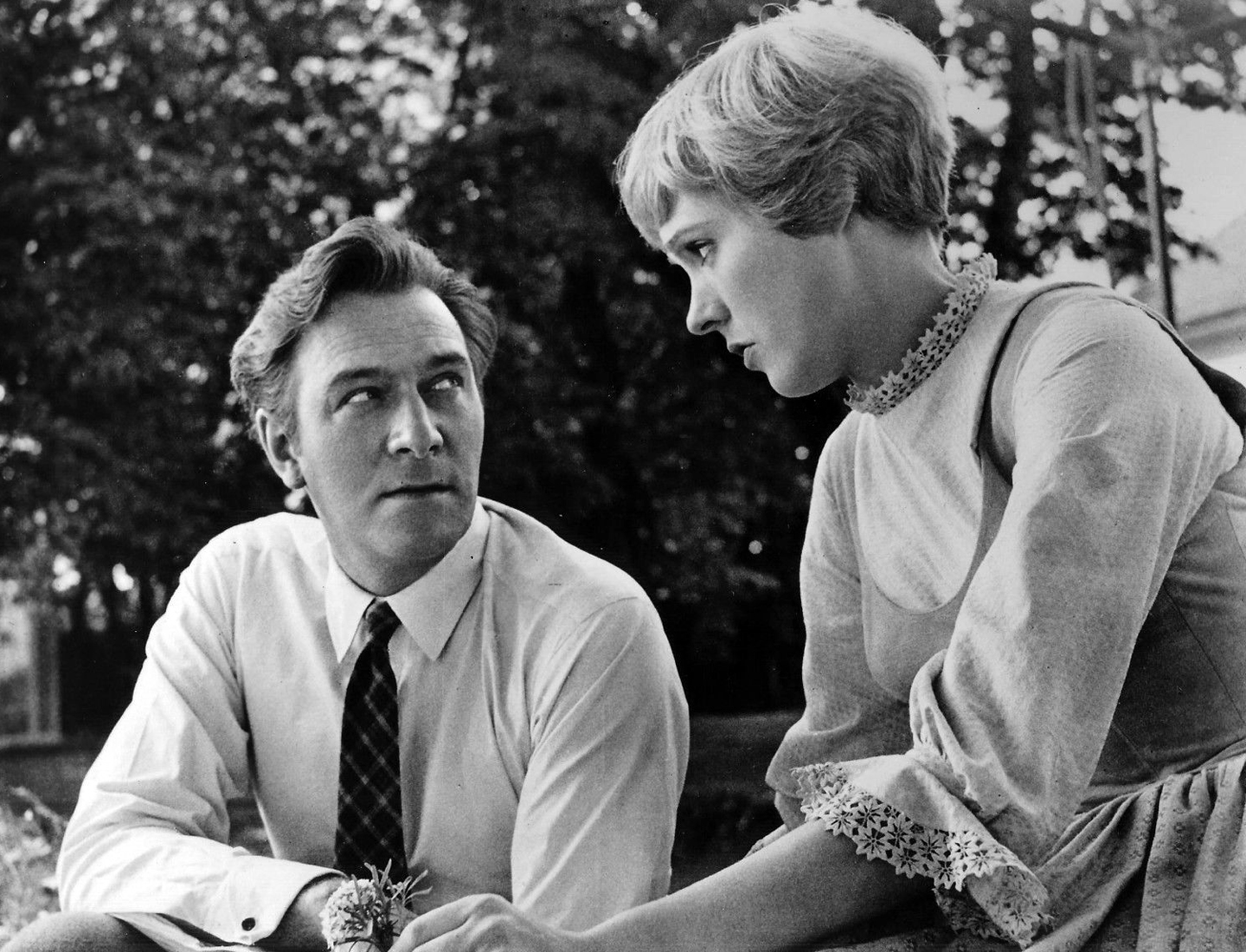
Andrews alongside co-star Christopher Plummer in The Sound of Music (1965)

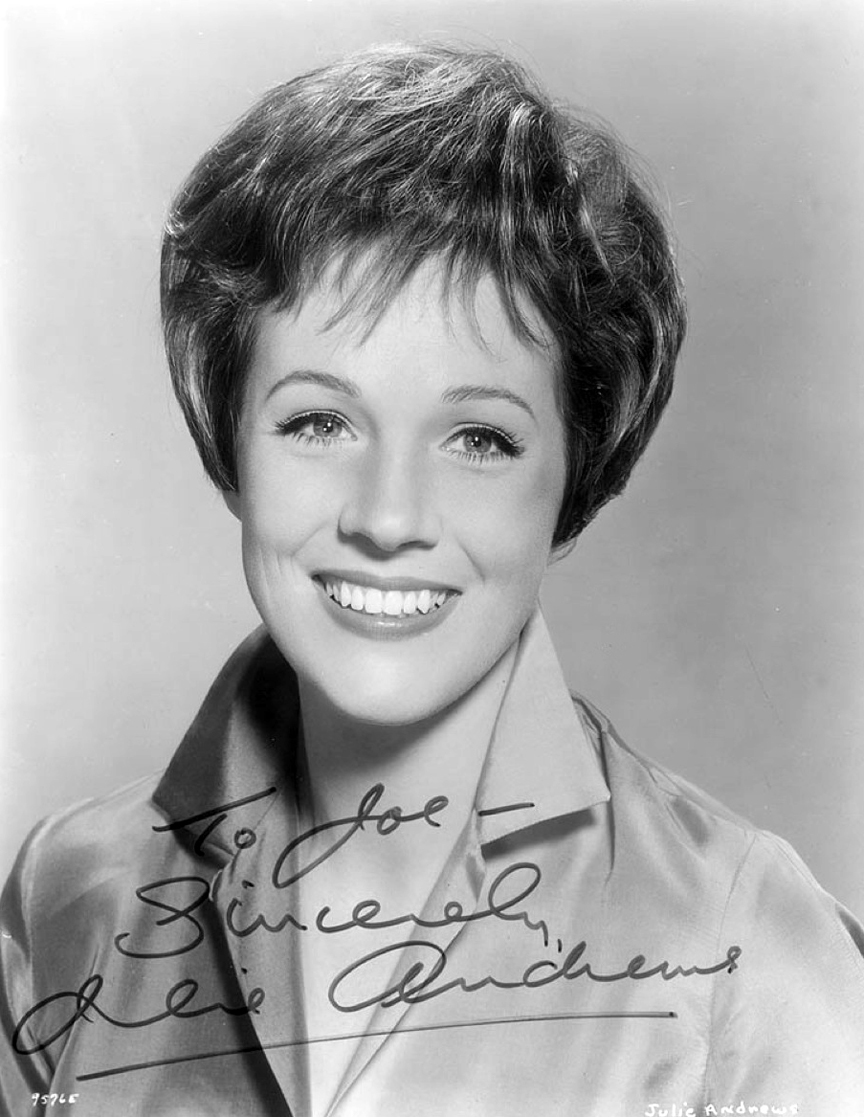
Publicity photo of Andrews c. 1965

Andrews starred opposite James Garner in the comedy-drama war film The Americanization of Emily (1964). Andrews took the role partly to avoid typecasting as a nanny. Bosley Crowther of The New York Times called Andrews "irresistible ... with a brush of sentiment" in both her comedic and emotional scenes. Andrews was nominated for the BAFTA Award for Best British Actress in a Leading Role. Andrews later described it as her favourite film, a sentiment shared by her co-star Garner. Andrews starred in The Sound of Music (1965), which was the highest-grossing film of its year. Andrews later said she was "ashamed" to admit that she thought the musical "rather saccharine" before being cast. Rehearsals took place in London before filming commenced in Salzburg, Austria, in 1964. Filming was rather slow; because of weather conditions in Salzburg, the cast were "lucky" if they got a single shot's worth of scenes.

Andrews stated she relied on lyrics to anchor her to the film's songs and utilised vocal interpretation to "convey" Maria's character by "[hanging] onto words and the images they conjured". Andrews wrote that her senses were "suffused" with Austria, saying that the music "still" and "always lives in her soul". The film received mixed reviews, though critics highlighted Andrews's performance; Crowther again praised her for her "air of radiant vigour ... plain-Jane wholesomeness and her ability to make her dialogue as vivid ... as she makes her songs". For her performance as Maria von Trapp, Andrews won her second Golden Globe Award for Best Actress – Motion Picture Comedy or Musical. She was nominated a second time for the Academy Award for Best Actress and the BAFTA Award for Best British Actress in a Leading Role. Andrews later wrote that the "gift" and "privilege" of portraying her first three film roles would have been "enough to satisfy" her for a lifetime.

After completing The Sound of Music, Andrews appeared as a guest star on the NBC-TV variety series The Andy Williams Show. She followed this television appearance with an Emmy Award-winning special, The Julie Andrews Show, which featured Gene Kelly and the New Christy Minstrels as guests. It aired on NBC-TV in November 1965. In 1966, Andrews starred in Hawaii, the highest-grossing film of its year. Also in 1966, she starred opposite Paul Newman in Torn Curtain, which was directed by Alfred Hitchcock and shot at Universal Studios Hollywood. Hitchcock gave Newman and Andrews relatively free rein in dialogue during production. She credits the director with teaching her extensively about lenses and camera work. During a press interview, she "made the mistake" of expressing her unhappiness with her performance and subsequently received a "terse" letter from Hitchcock, which Andrews later cited as an "important lesson". The film received mixed reviews upon release.

The following year, Andrews played the titular character in Thoroughly Modern Millie (1967). Andrews described work on the film as a "pleasant distraction" for "allowing her to be something of a clown", as her stepfather died shortly before filming. The film was a box office success; critics described Andrews as "very much the leading lady" and "absolutely darling" as well as "deliciously spirited and dry". The film was nominated for seven Academy Awards, and Andrews scored a Golden Globe nomination for her performance. At the time, Thoroughly Modern Millie and Torn Curtain were the biggest and second-biggest hits in Universal Pictures history, respectively.

=== 1968–1996: Collaborations with Blake Edwards ===
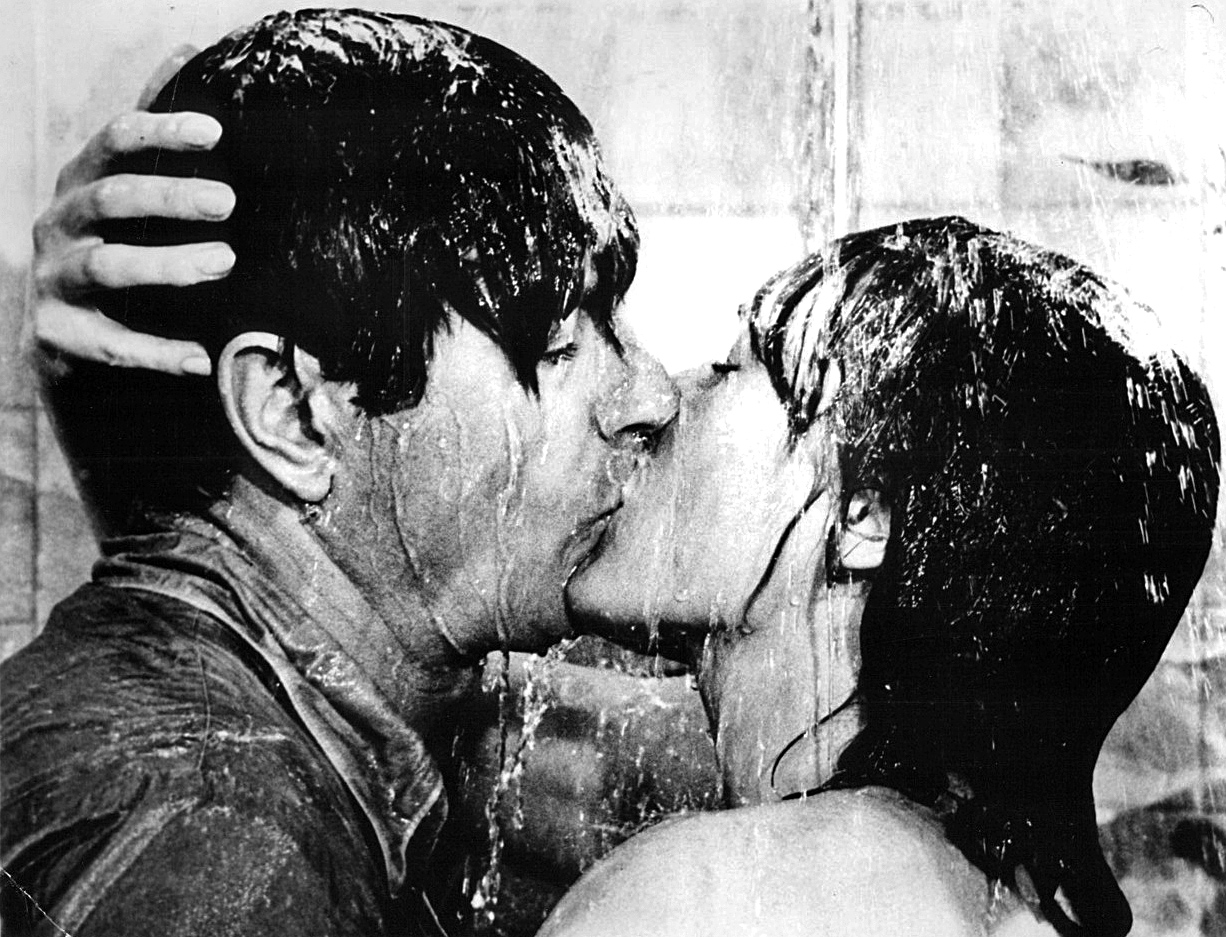
Rock Hudson and Andrews kissing in Darling Lili (1970)

Andrews next appeared in two of Hollywood's most expensive flops: Star! (1968), a biopic of Gertrude Lawrence; and Darling Lili (1970), co-starring Rock Hudson and directed by her second husband, Blake Edwards. Andrews "went through her usual period of insecurity" during the production of Star!, intensely analysing her choices for the character. Choreographer Michael Kidd worked closely with Andrews during the complicated musical numbers, which Andrews regarded as physically and mentally gruelling, coupled with her divorce from her first husband, Tony Walton. The New York Times singled out the film as "not one of [Andrews]'s best", while Variety wrote her "carefully built-up" performance "sagged" with "overdone hoydenishness". Despite reviews, her performance was again nominated for a Golden Globe Award for Best Actress – Motion Picture Comedy or Musical. Andrews regards her friendships with Kidd and director Robert Wise as her "greatest gifts" from the film.

Edwards pitched the concept of Darling Lili to Andrews two years prior to the start of production in 1968. She prerecorded original songs for the film with Henry Mancini and Johnny Mercer. Andrews cited Darling Lili's tepid reviews as being caused by studio marketing and postproduction issues. While the film was a commercial bomb, the New York Times praised Andrews's performance, calling her an "unmitigated delight" and "perfect centerpiece" of the film, praising "her coolness and precision as a comedienne and a singer". She was nominated for the Golden Globe Award for Best Actress – Motion Picture Comedy or Musical, while the film won both the Golden Globe and Academy Awards for Best Original Song. Of these films, Andrews later wrote that "nonstop success in a career is impossible [...] but nobody sets out to make a failure, either".

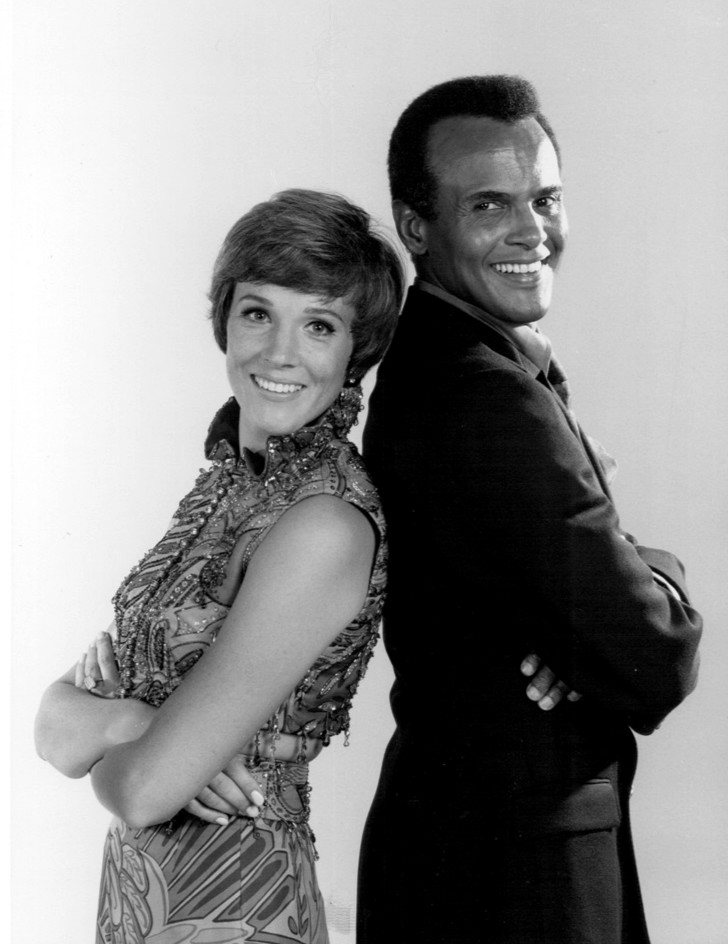
Andrews with Harry Belafonte in 1969

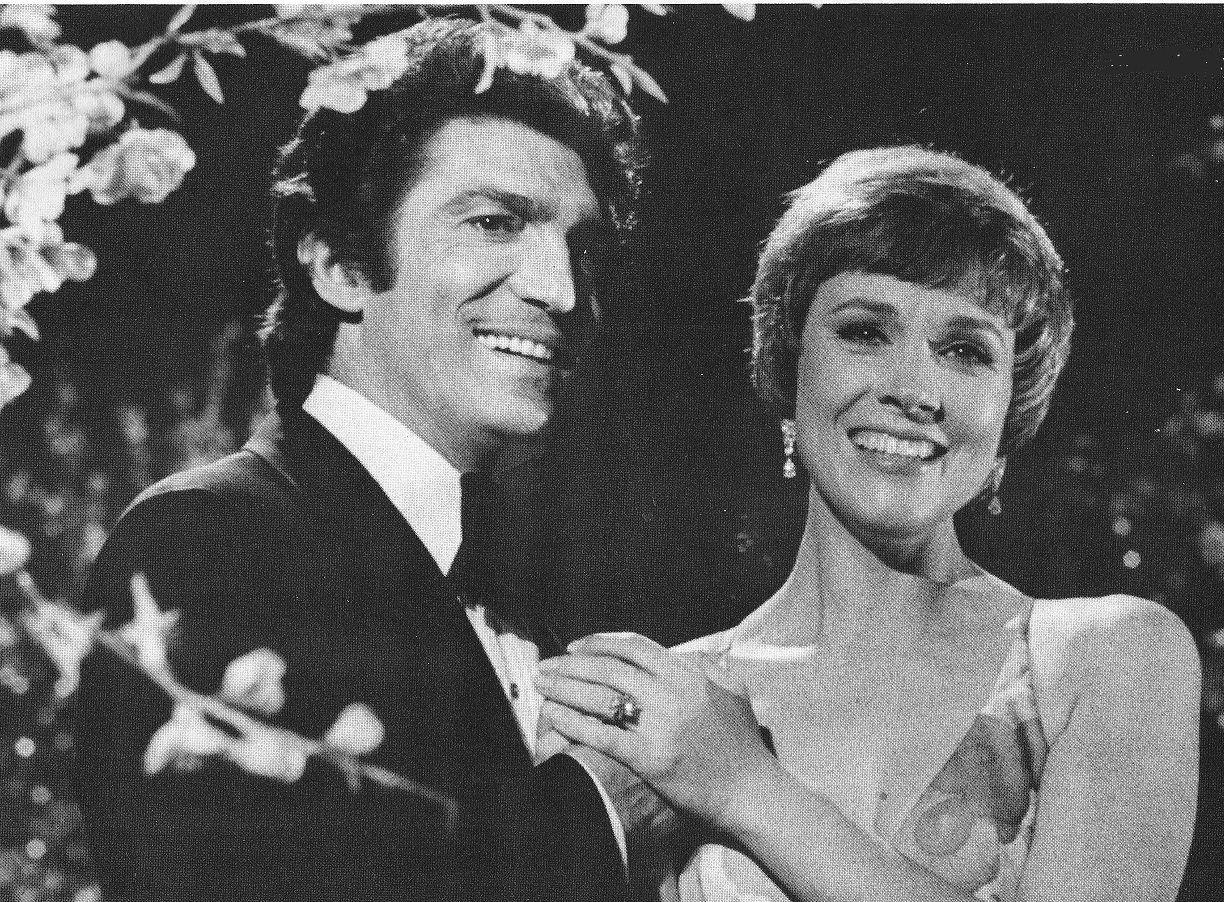
Andrews with Italian tenor Sergio Franchi in 1973

Andrews was the first choice to play the English witch Eglantine Price in Disney's Bedknobs and Broomsticks (1971); Angela Lansbury was cast. Andrews continued working in television. In 1969, she shared the spotlight with singer Harry Belafonte for an NBC-TV special, An Evening with Julie Andrews and Harry Belafonte. In 1971, she appeared as a guest for the Grand Opening Special of Walt Disney World, and that same year she and Carol Burnett headlined a CBS special, Julie and Carol At Lincoln Center. In 1972–73, Andrews starred in her own television variety series, The Julie Andrews Hour, on the ABC network.

The show won seven Emmy Awards but was cancelled after one season. Between 1973 and 1975, Andrews continued her association with ABC by headlining five variety specials for the network. She guest-starred on The Muppet Show in 1977, and the following year, she appeared again with the Muppets on a CBS television variety special. The programme, Julie Andrews: One Step Into Spring, aired in March 1978, to mixed reviews and mediocre ratings. She made only two other films in the 1970s, The Tamarind Seed (1974) and 10 (1979), both successful at the box office and by critics' reviews.

In February 1980, Andrews headlined "Because We Care", a CBS-TV special with 30 major stars raising funds for Cambodian famine victims through Operation California (now Operation USA, on whose board she serves). Later that year, she starred in Little Miss Marker as "English rose" Amanda Worthington (a label she had first been given in the 1960s). In Blake Edwards's S.O.B. (1981), she played Sally Miles, a character who agrees to "show my boobies" in a scene in the film-within-a-film. A dual role of Victoria Grant and Count Victor Grezhinski in the film Victor/Victoria (1982) reunited her with Garner. Her performance earned her a Golden Globe Award for Best Actress – Motion Picture Comedy or Musical, as well as a nomination for the 1982 Academy Award for Best Actress, her third Oscar nomination. In 1983, Andrews was chosen as the Hasty Pudding Woman of the Year by the Harvard University Theatrical Society. That year, she co-starred with Burt Reynolds in The Man Who Loved Women. Her next two films were That's Life! and Duet for One (both 1986), which earned her Golden Globe nominations. In December 1987, Andrews starred in an ABC Christmas special, Julie Andrews: The Sound Of Christmas, which went on to win five Emmy Awards. Two years later, she was reunited for the third time with Carol Burnett for a variety special which aired on ABC in December 1989.

In 1991, Andrews made her television dramatic debut in the ABC made-for-TV film Our Sons, co-starring Ann-Margret. Andrews was named a Disney Legend within the year. In the summer of 1992, Andrews starred in her first television sitcom; the short-lived Julie aired on ABC for only seven episodes and co-starred James Farentino. In December 1992 she hosted the NBC holiday special Christmas In Washington. Having played a Cockney flower seller in My Fair Lady, Andrews had an orangey-salmon pink rose named after her at London's Chelsea Flower Show in 1992; she stated she was "ever so flattered". Portions of the sales of the "Julie Andrews Rose" were donated to charity. In 1993, she starred in a limited run at the Manhattan Theatre Club in the American premiere of Stephen Sondheim's revue Putting It Together. Between 1994 and 1995, Andrews recorded two solo albums – the first saluted the music of Richard Rodgers and the second paid tribute to the words of Alan Jay Lerner. In 1995, she starred in the stage musical version of Victor/Victoria. It was her first appearance in a Broadway show in 35 years. Opening on Broadway on 25 October 1995 at the Marquis Theatre, it later went on the road for a world tour. When she was the only Tony Award nominee for the production, she declined the nomination, saying that she could not accept because she felt the entire production was snubbed.

=== 1997–present: Children's entertainment and later roles ===
A botched vocal surgery in 1997 led to the loss of Andrews's singing voice, occasioning her refusal to sing on camera for several years. Despite this, Andrews kept busy with many projects. In 1998, she appeared in a stage production of Dr. Dolittle in London. As recounted on the Julie Andrews website, she performed the voice of Polynesia the parrot and "recorded some 700 sentences and sounds, which were placed on a computer chip that sat in the mechanical bird's mouth. In the song 'Talk to the Animals,' Polynesia the parrot even sings." The next year Andrews was reunited with James Garner for the CBS made-for-TV film One Special Night, which aired in November 1999.

In the 2000 New Year Honours List, Andrews was made a Dame Commander of the Order of the British Empire (DBE) for services to the performing arts and received the insignia from Queen Elizabeth II at Buckingham Palace. In 2002, Andrews was among the guests at the Queen's Golden Jubilee Hollywood party held at the Beverly Wilshire Hotel. She also appears at No.59 on the 2002 poll of the "100 Greatest Britons" sponsored by the BBC and chosen by the British public.

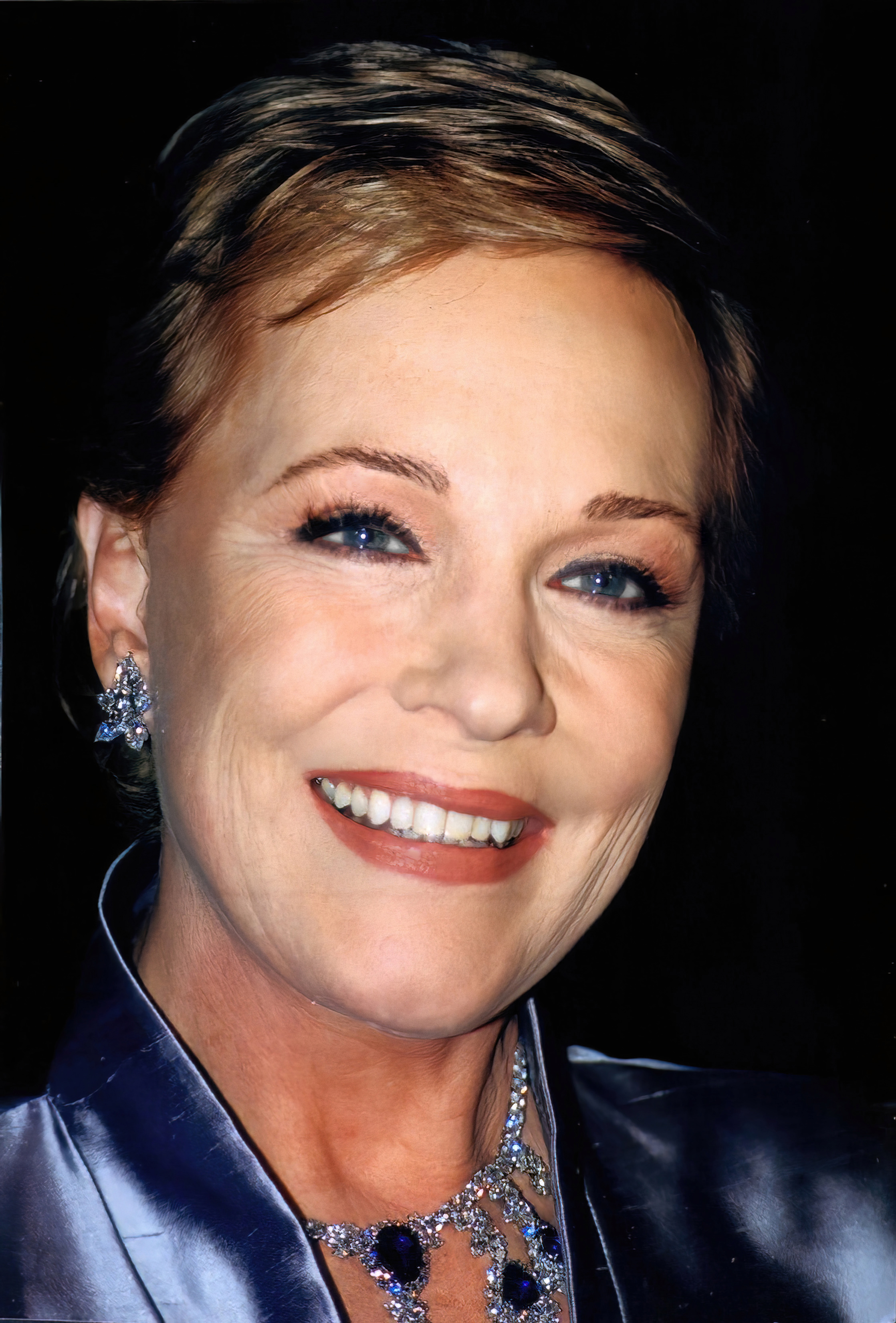
Andrews pictured in 2001, the year she starred as Queen Clarisse Marie Renaldi in The Princess Diaries

In 2001, Andrews received Kennedy Center Honors. The same year, she reunited with Sound of Music co-star Christopher Plummer in a live television performance of On Golden Pond (an adaptation of the 1979 play). Andrews appeared in The Princess Diaries, her first Disney film since Mary Poppins. She starred as Queen Clarisse Marie Renaldi and reprised the role in the 2004 sequel, The Princess Diaries 2: Royal Engagement. In the film, Andrews sang on film for the first time since having throat surgery. The song, "Your Crowning Glory", a duet with Raven-Symoné, was set in a limited range of an octave to accommodate her recovering voice. The film's music supervisor, Dawn Soler, recalled that Andrews "nailed the song on the first take. I looked around and I saw grips with tears in their eyes".

Andrews continued her association with Disney when she appeared as the nanny in two television films based on the Eloise books, a series of children's books by Kay Thompson about a child who lives in the Plaza Hotel in New York City. Eloise at the Plaza premiered in April 2003, and Eloise at Christmastime was broadcast in November 2003; Andrews was nominated for an Emmy Award. The same year she made her debut as a theatre director, directing a revival of The Boy Friend, the musical in which she made her 1954 Broadway debut, at the Bay Street Theatre in Sag Harbor, New York. Her production, which featured costume and scenic design by her former husband Tony Walton, was remounted at the Goodspeed Opera House in 2005 and went on a national tour in 2006.

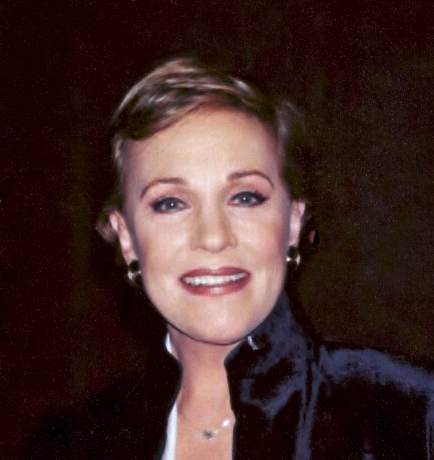
Andrews pictured in 2003, the year she was nominated for an Emmy Award for Eloise at Christmastime

From 2005 to 2006, Andrews served as the Official Ambassador for Disneyland's 18-month-long, 50th-anniversary celebration, the "Happiest Homecoming on Earth", travelling to promote the celebration, recording narration and appearing at several events at the park. On 17 March 2005, Andrews appeared onstage during the curtain calls for the musical of Mary Poppins at the Prince Edward Theatre in London's West End, where she gave a speech recalling her own memories from making the film and praised the cast for their new interpretation. In 2004, Andrews voiced Queen Lillian in the animated blockbuster Shrek 2 (2004), reprising the role for its sequels, Shrek the Third (2007) and Shrek Forever After (2010). Also in 2007, she narrated Enchanted, a live-action Disney musical comedy that both parodied and paid homage to Disney films.

On 1 May 2005, Disneyland debuted a new fireworks show, Remember... Dreams Come True, for Disneyland's 50th anniversary, with Andrews being the host and narrator of the show. In January 2007, Andrews was honoured with the Lifetime Achievement Award at the Screen Actors Guild's awards and stated that her goals included continuing to direct for the stage and possibly to produce her own Broadway musical. She published Home: A Memoir of My Early Years, which she characterised as "part one" of her autobiography, on 1 April 2008. Home chronicles her early years in Britain's music hall circuit and ends in 1962 with her winning the role of Mary Poppins. For a Walt Disney video release, she again portrayed Mary Poppins and narrated the story of The Cat That Looked at a King in 2004. From July until early August 2008, Andrews hosted Julie Andrews' The Gift of Music, a short tour of the United States where she sang various Rodgers and Hammerstein songs and symphonised her recently published book, Simeon's Gift. Appearances included the Hollywood Bowl in Los Angeles, the Mann Center for the Performing Arts in Philadelphia, and a performance with the Atlanta Symphony Orchestra. These were her first public singing performances in a dozen years, due to her failed vocal cord surgery. In January 2009, Andrews was named on The Times' list of the top 10 British Actresses of all time. The list included Helen Mirren, Helena Bonham Carter, Judi Dench, and Audrey Hepburn. Also in 2009, Andrews received the honorary George and Ira Gershwin Award for Lifetime Musical Achievement.

In January 2010, Andrews was the official United States presenter for the Great Performances From Vienna: The New Year's Celebration 2010 concert. This was her second appearance in this role, after presenting the previous year's concert. Andrews also had a supporting role in the film Tooth Fairy, which opened to unfavourable reviews although the box office receipts were successful. On her promotion tour for the film, she also spoke of Operation USA and the aid campaign to the Haiti disaster.

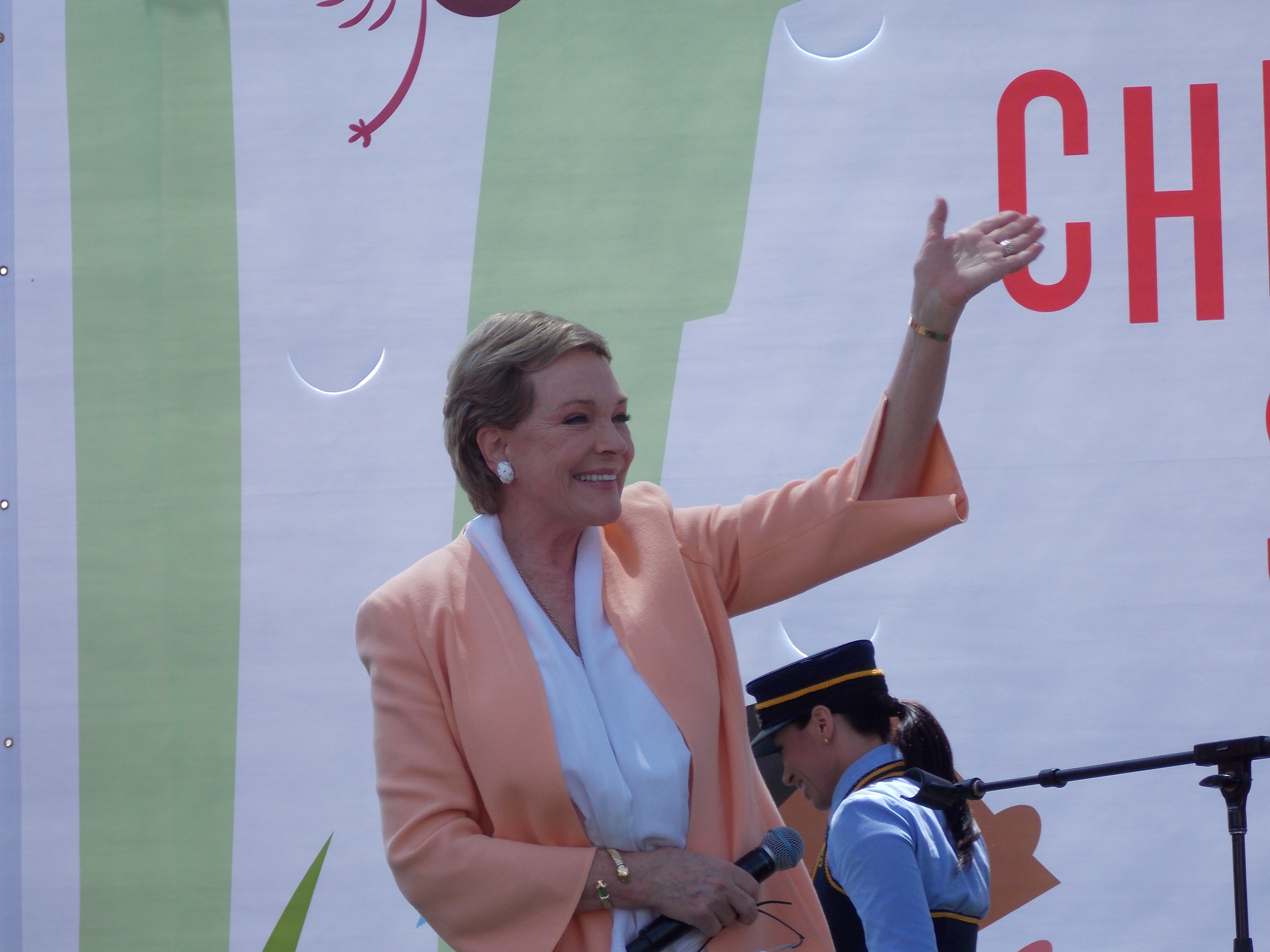
Andrews at Los Angeles Times Festival of Books at University of Southern California

On 8 May 2010, Andrews made her London comeback after a 21-year absence (her last performance there was a Christmas concert at the Royal Festival Hall in 1989). She performed at The O2 Arena, accompanied by the Royal Philharmonic Orchestra and an ensemble of five performers. Earlier (on 15 December 2009 and on many other occasions), she appeared on British television saying that rumours that she would be singing at the performance were not true and that she would be doing a form of "speak singing". However, she sang two solos and several duets and ensemble pieces. The evening, though well received by the 20,000 fans present, who gave her standing ovation after standing ovation, did not convince the critics.

On 18 May 2010, Andrews's 23rd book (this one also written with her daughter Emma) was published. In June 2010, the book, entitled The Very Fairy Princess, reached number 1 on The New York Times Best Seller List for Children's Books. On 21 May 2010, her film Shrek Forever After was released; in it Andrews reprises her role as the Queen. On 9 July 2010, Despicable Me, an animated film in which Andrews lent her voice to Marlena Gru, the thoughtless and soul-crushing mother of the main character Gru (voiced by Steve Carell), opened to rave reviews and strong box office. On 28 October 2010, Andrews appeared, along with the actors who portrayed the cinematic von Trapp family members, on Oprah to commemorate the film's 45th anniversary. A few days later, her 24th book, Little Bo in Italy, was published.

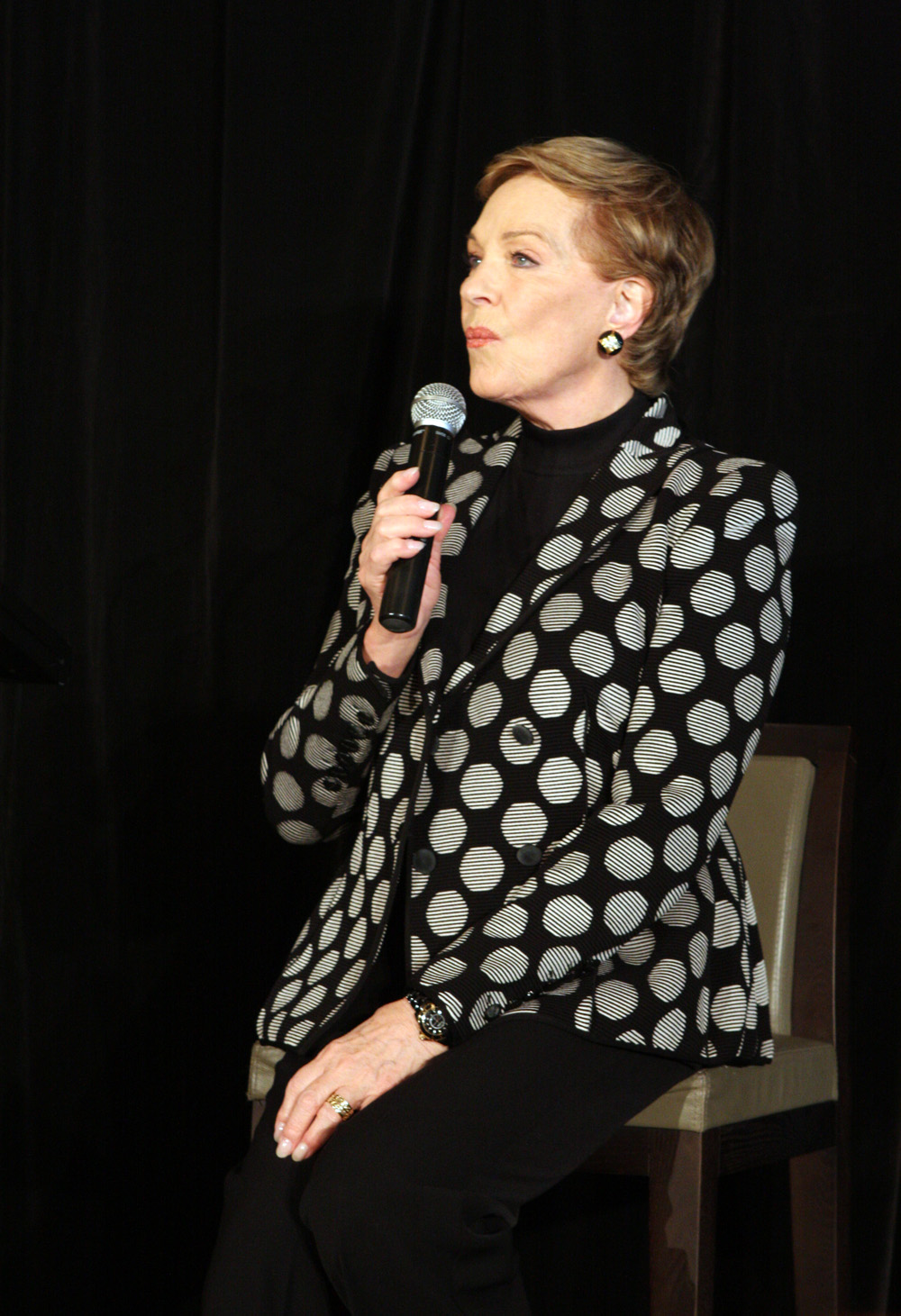
Andrews on tour in Sydney, Australia, in 2013

In February 2011, Andrews received a Grammy Lifetime Achievement Award and, with her daughter Emma, a Grammy for Best Spoken Word Album for Children (for A Collection of Poems, Songs and Lullabies), at the 53rd Grammy Awards. In her memoir, Home Work (2019), Andrews discussed being offered the role of Aunt Emma by Martin Scorsese for his film The Wolf of Wall Street (2013). She declined, citing a recent surgery and saying she wasn't "ready to go back to work" but "would've loved to have done it". At the age of 77, Andrews undertook her first tour of Australia and New Zealand in 2013, hosted by Nicholas Hammond who was a boy of 14 when they appeared together in The Sound of Music. In place of singing, she planned a series of speaking engagements in Australia's five mainland state capitals. The following year she took the show on a tour of England, which was hosted by Aled Jones. The tour began with a May date at the National Indoor Arena in Birmingham and included an appearance at the Echo Arena in Liverpool.

Andrews has twice directed a musical stage adaptation of The Great American Mousical, based on the 2006 children's book she wrote with her daughter Emma. The musical was written by Zina Goldrich (music) and Marcy Heisler (lyrics), with book by Hunter Bell. Andrews first directed the play for its premiere in 2012 at Goodspeed Musicals' Norma Terris Theatre in Chester, Connecticut. In 2024, she directed a second, sold-out production at Legacy Theatre in Branford, Connecticut.

In 2015, Andrews made a surprise appearance at the Oscars, greeting Lady Gaga who paid her homage by singing a medley from The Sound of Music. This became a social media sensation, trending all over the world. Lyndon Terracini announced in August 2015 that Andrews would direct My Fair Lady in 2016 for Opera Australia at the Sydney Opera House. In 2016, Andrews created the preschool television series Julie's Greenroom with her daughter, Emma, and Judy Rothman. Andrews is joined by her assistant Gus (Giullian Yao Gioiello) and "Greenies", a cast of original puppets built by The Jim Henson Company. The series premiered on Netflix in 2017. In 2017, Andrews also reprised her role as Marlena Gru in the second Despicable Me sequel Despicable Me 3. In 2018, Andrews voiced Karathen, a leviathan, in James Wan's Aquaman. That same year, she declined a cameo appearance in Mary Poppins Returns to avoid stealing the limelight now belonging to star Emily Blunt.

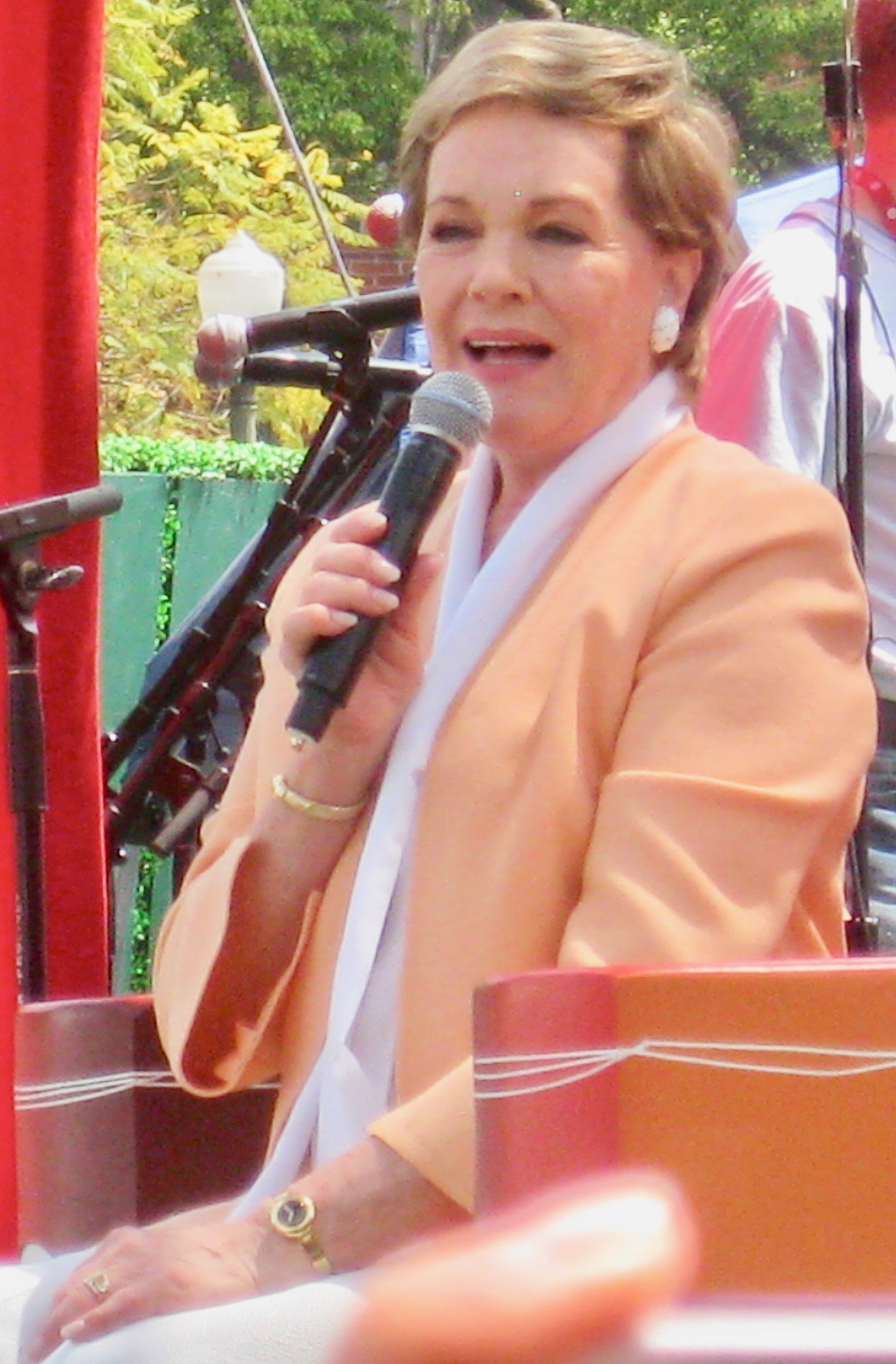
Julie Andrews at the LA Times Festival of Books in April 2012

Beginning in December 2020, Andrews voiced the narrator Lady Whistledown in the Netflix period drama series Bridgerton. In 2022, Andrews narrated the film The King's Daughter for Gravitas Ventures. She recorded her narration in 2020. A few weeks later she was announced to be the narrator. On 9 June 2022, Andrews was honoured by the American Film Institute with a Lifetime Achievement Award, where she reflected on her career and received tributes by multiple artists. The same year, she reprised her role as Gru's mother in Minions: The Rise of Gru.

In April 2023, Andrews participated in the NBC primetime special Carol Burnett: 90 Years of Laughter + Love where she paid tribute to her friend Carol Burnett. The same year, she also made a featured taped appearance on the primetime CBS special Dick Van Dyke: 98 Years of Magic, wherein she told the story of working alongside Van Dyke in the 1964 film Mary Poppins.

In September 2025, Andrews received an Emmy for Outstanding Character Voice-Over Performance for her voicework as Lady Whistledown in the third season of Bridgerton. At age 89, she surpassed Betty White as the oldest woman to win an Emmy. She would extend this record the following year, winning the same award at age 90 for the series' fourth season.

In August 2026, in response to a question about an in-development third film in the Princess Diaries franchise, Andrews stated that she had retired from on-screen acting. She described herself as "not completely retired, but it's a different kind of work that I do these days — [writing] books, and I do a lot of recording of podcasts and voiceovers."

== Personal life ==
Andrews married set designer Tony Walton on 10 May 1959 in Weybridge, Surrey. Maggie Smith was a guest. Andrews and Walton first met in 1948 when Andrews was appearing at the London Casino in the show Humpty Dumpty. In 1962, their daughter, Emma Walton Hamilton, was born. Andrews filed for divorce in 1967 because their careers and the obligations of parenthood were straining their marriage. Their divorce was finalized the next year, but they remained friends until Walton's death in 2022.

In November 1969, Andrews married director Blake Edwards, who had been her companion for two years, becoming stepmother to his two children, including Jennifer. In the 1970s, Edwards and Andrews adopted two Vietnamese girls. They were married for 41 years, until Edwards's death at the age of 88 on 15 December 2010 at the Saint John's Health Center in Santa Monica, California, from complications of pneumonia. Andrews was by her husband's side when he died. Andrews is a grandmother to nine and a great-grandmother to three.

Andrews lives in Sag Harbor, New York, where the Bay Street Theater was co-founded by her daughter Emma.

== Vocal styling ==
"Loch Lomond"
A live recording of Andrews singing "The Bonnie Banks o' Loch Lomond" with choral backing in 1972.

Once termed "Britain's youngest prima donna", Andrews's classically trained soprano voice has been described as light, bright and operatic in tone and praised for its "pure and clear" sound. When she was young, a throat specialist examined her and determined that she had "an almost adult larynx". Despite being encouraged to pursue opera by her voice teacher, soprano Lilian Stiles-Allen, Andrews felt that her voice was unsuited for the genre and "too big a stretch". At the time, she described her own voice as "extremely high and thin", feeling that it lacked "the necessary guts and weight for opera", preferring musical theatre instead.

Over the years, her voice naturally deepened. Losing her vast upper register, her "top notes" became increasingly difficult to sing while "her middle register matured into the warm golden tone" for which she has become known, according to Tim Wong of The Daily Telegraph. Musically, she had always preferred singing music that was "bright and sunny", choosing to avoid songs that were sad or otherwise written in a minor key, for fear of losing her voice "in a mess of emotion". She cited this as another reason for avoiding opera.

=== Loss of singing voice ===
Andrews was forced to quit the Victor/Victoria stage production towards the end of the Broadway run in 1997, when she developed hoarseness in her voice. She underwent surgery at New York's Mount Sinai Hospital, reportedly to remove non-cancerous nodules from her throat, although she later stated the hoarseness was due to "a certain kind of muscular striation [that] happens on the vocal cords"—itself the result of a strain from Victor/Victoria (she added "I didn't have cancer, I didn't have nodules, I didn't have anything").

Andrews emerged from the surgery with permanent damage that destroyed the purity of her singing and made her speaking voice raspy. In 1999, she filed a malpractice suit against the doctors at Mount Sinai Hospital, including Scott Kessler and Jeffrey Libin, who had operated on her throat. The doctors had assured Andrews that she would regain her voice within six weeks, but Andrews's stepdaughter, Jennifer Edwards, said in 1999, "It's been two years, and [her singing voice] still hasn't returned." The lawsuit was settled in September 2000 for an undisclosed amount.

After 2000, Steven M. Zeitels, director of the Massachusetts General Hospital (MGH) Center for Laryngeal Surgery and Voice Rehabilitation, operated on her four times and, while able to improve her speaking voice, was unable to restore her singing. She was also treated by otolaryngologist Robert Sataloff, who specializes in vocal care for professional singers.

== Awards and honours ==
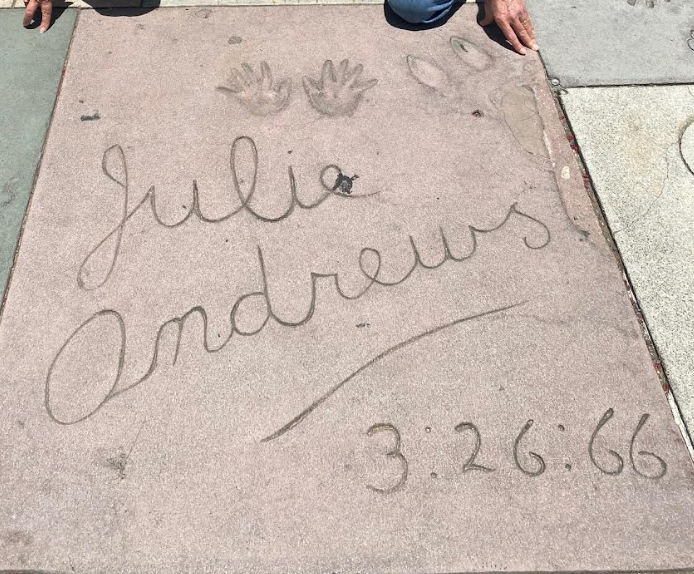
Julie Andrews's signature, handprints, and footprints in the concrete in front of Grauman's Chinese Theatre in Los Angeles

Over her career, Andrews received numerous accolades including an Academy Award, a BAFTA Award, six Golden Globe Awards, three Grammy Awards, and four Emmy Awards. Despite being nominated for three Tony Awards, Andrews never won. In June 2022, Andrews was awarded the AFI Life Achievement Award at a ceremony in Los Angeles after a two-year delay due to the COVID-19 pandemic. In 2002, Andrews was ranked No. 59 in the BBC's poll of the 100 Greatest Britons.

== Bibliography ==
Andrews published several books (mainly children's books and autobiographies) under her name, as well as her married names Julie Andrews Edwards and Julie Edwards.

- Andrews, Julie. Home: A Memoir of My Early Years. Hyperion, 2008. ISBN 0-7868-6565-2.
- Andrews, Julie. Home: A Memoir of My Early Years at Internet Archive. Hyperion, 2008
- Andrews, Julie and Emma Walton Hamilton (authors). Home Work: A Memoir of My Hollywood Years. Hachette, 2019. ISBN 9780316349253.
- Andrews, Julie and Emma Walton Hamilton (authors) and Christine Davenier (Illustrator). Very Fairy Princess. Little Brown, 2010. ISBN 978-0-316-04050-1.
- Andrews, Julie and Emma Walton Hamilton (authors) and James McMullan (Illustrator). Julie Andrews' Collection of Poems, Songs, and Lullabies. Little Brown, 2009. ISBN 978-0-316-04049-5.
- Edwards, Julie Andrews (author) and Judith Gwyn Brown (illustrator). Mandy. Harper & Row, 1971. ISBN 0-06-440296-7.
- Edwards, Julie Andrews (author) and Johanna Westerman (illustrator). Mandy: 35th Anniversary Edition. HarperCollins, 2006. ISBN 0-06-113162-8.
- Edwards, Julie. The Last of the Really Great Whangdoodles. New York: Harper and Row. 1974. ISBN 0-00-184461-X.
- Edwards, Julie Andrews. Little Bo: The Story of Bonnie Boadicea. Hyperion, 1999. ISBN 0-7868-0514-5. (several others in this series)
- Edwards, Julie Andrews and Emma Walton Hamilton. Dumpy the Dumptruck. Hyperion, 2000. ISBN 0-7868-0609-5. (several others in the Dumpy series)
- Edwards, Julie Andrews and Emma Walton Hamilton, (authors). Gennady Spirin (illustrator). Simeon's Gift. 2003. ISBN 0-06-008914-8.
- Edwards, Julie Andrews and Emma Walton Hamilton. Dragon: Hound of Honor. HarperTrophy, 2005. ISBN 0-06-057121-7.
- Edwards, Julie Andrews and Emma Walton Hamilton (authors) and Tony Walton (illustrator). The Great American Mousical. HarperTrophy, 2006. ISBN 0-06-057918-8.
- Edwards, Julie Andrews; Walton Hamilton, Emma (2007). Thanks to You: Wisdom from Mother and Child. Julie Andrews Collection. ISBN 978-0-06-124002-7..

== See also ==
- List of Academy Award winners and nominees from Great Britain
- List of actors with Academy Award nominations
- List of actors with more than one Academy Award nomination in the acting categories
- List of British Grammy Award winners and nominees
- List of Golden Globe winners
- List of Primetime Emmy Award winners
- List of actors with Hollywood Walk of Fame motion picture stars
- List of stars on the Hollywood Walk of Fame
