= List of awards and nominations received by Peter O'Toole =

Peter O'Toole awards and nominations
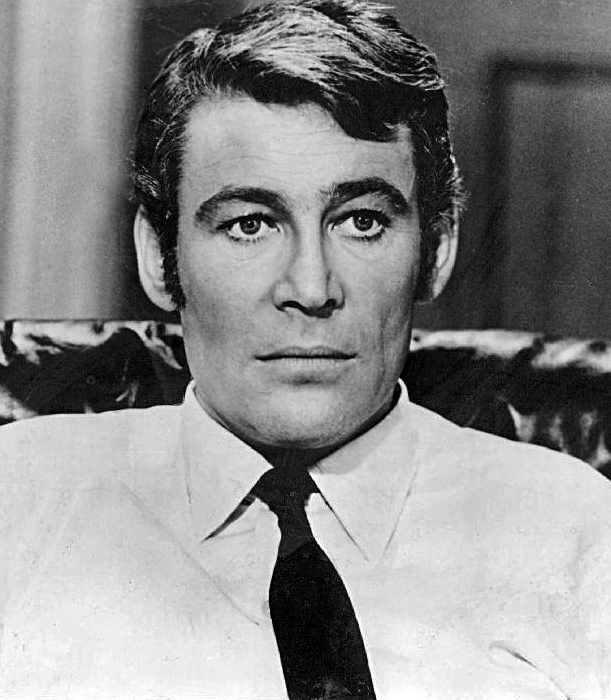
- O'Toole in 1968
Awards and nominations
Award	Wins	Nominations
Academy Awards	1	9
Actor Awards	0	1
British Academy Film Awards	1	4
Golden Globe Awards	4	11
Grammy Awards	0	1
Emmy Awards	1	3
Laurence Olivier Awards	0	1

Totals (Note: Certain award groups do not simply award one winner. They acknowledge several different recipients, have runners-up, and have third place. Since this is a specific recognition and is different from losing an award, runner-up mentions are considered wins in this award tally. For simplification and to avoid errors, each award in this list has been presumed to have had a prior nomination.)
- Wins: 50
- Nominations: 100

This article is a List of awards and nominations received by Peter O'Toole.

Peter O'Toole is an English and Irish actor known for his roles on stage and screen. Over his distinguished career he received several accolades including an Honorary Academy Award, a British Academy Film Award, four Golden Globe Awards, and a Primetime Emmy Awards as well as nominations for eight competitive Academy Awards, an Actor Award, a Grammy Award, and a Laurence Olivier Award.

O'Toole achieved international recognition playing T. E. Lawrence in Lawrence of Arabia (1962) for which he received his first nomination for the Academy Award for Best Actor. He was nominated for this award another seven times: for playing King Henry II in Becket (1964) and The Lion in Winter (1968), a public school teacher in Goodbye, Mr. Chips (1969), a paranoid schizophrenic in The Ruling Class (1972), a ruthless film director in The Stunt Man (1980), a film actor in My Favorite Year (1982), and an elderly man in Venus (2006) – and holds the record for the most Oscar nominations for acting without a win (tied with Glenn Close). He was awarded the Academy Honorary Award in 2002.

On television, he received the Primetime Emmy Award for Outstanding Supporting Actor in a Limited Series or Movie for his portrayal of Bishop Pierre Cauchon in the CBS miniseries Joan of Arc (1999). He was Emmy-nominated for his performances as Lucius Flavius Silva in the ABC miniseries Masada (1981), and Paul von Hindenburg in the miniseries Hitler: The Rise of Evil (2003).

== Major associations ==
=== Academy Awards ===
Year	Category	Work	Result	Winner	Ref.
1962	Best Actor	Lawrence of Arabia	Nominated	Gregory Peck, To Kill a Mockingbird	
1964	Best Actor	Becket	Nominated	Rex Harrison, My Fair Lady	
1968	Best Actor	The Lion in Winter	Nominated	Cliff Robertson, Charly	
1969	Best Actor	Goodbye, Mr. Chips	Nominated	John Wayne, True Grit	
1972	Best Actor	The Ruling Class	Nominated	Marlon Brando, The Godfather	
1980	Best Actor	The Stunt Man	Nominated	Robert De Niro, Raging Bull	
1982	Best Actor	My Favorite Year	Nominated	Ben Kingsley, Gandhi	
2002	Honorary Academy Award	—N/a	Honored	—N/a	
2006	Best Actor	Venus	Nominated	Forest Whitaker, The Last King of Scotland	

=== Actor Awards ===
Year	Category	Nominated work	Result	Ref.
2007	Outstanding Actor in a Leading Role	Venus	Nominated	

=== BAFTA Awards ===
Year	Category	Nominated work	Result	Ref.
1963	Best British Actor	Lawrence of Arabia	Won	
1965	Best British Actor	Becket	Nominated	
1989	Best Actor in a Supporting Role	The Last Emperor	Nominated	
2007	Best Actor in a Leading Role	Venus	Nominated	

=== Emmy Awards ===
Primetime Emmy Awards
Year	Category	Nominated work	Result	Ref.
1981	Outstanding Lead Actor in a Limited Series or Movie	Masada	Nominated	
1999	Outstanding Supporting Actor in a Limited Series or Movie	Joan of Arc	Won	
2003	Outstanding Supporting Actor in a Limited Series or Movie	Hitler: The Rise of Evil	Nominated	

=== Golden Globe Award ===
Year	Category	Nominated work	Result	Ref.
1963	Most Promising Newcomer – Male	Lawrence of Arabia	Won	
1963	Best Actor – Motion Picture Drama	Lawrence of Arabia	Nominated	
1965	Best Actor – Motion Picture Drama	Becket	Won	
1969	Best Actor – Motion Picture Drama	The Lion in Winter	Won	
1970	Best Actor – Motion Picture Musical or Comedy	Goodbye, Mr. Chips	Won	
1973	Best Actor – Motion Picture Musical or Comedy	Man of La Mancha	Nominated	
1981	Best Actor – Motion Picture Drama	The Stunt Man	Nominated	
1982	Best Actor – Miniseries or Television Film	Masada	Nominated	
1983	Best Actor – Motion Picture Musical or Comedy	My Favorite Year	Nominated	
2000	Best Supporting Actor – Television	Joan of Arc	Nominated	
2007	Best Actor – Motion Picture Drama	Venus	Nominated	

=== Grammy Award ===
Year	Category	Nominated work	Result	Ref.
1965	Best Spoken Word Album	Dialogue Highlights from Becket	Nominated	

=== Laurence Olivier Awards ===
Year	Category	Nominated work	Result	Ref.
1990	Best Comedy Performance	Jeffrey Bernard Is Unwell	Nominated	

== Critics awards ==
Organizations	Year	Category	Work	Result	Ref.
Critics' Choice Movie Awards	2007	Best Actor	Venus	Nominated	
Chicago Film Critics Association	2006	Best Actor	Venus	Nominated	
Dallas–Fort Worth Film Critics Association	2006	Best Actor	Venus	Nominated	
London Film Critics' Circle	2009	Best British Supporting Actor of the Year	Dean Spanley	Nominated	
Los Angeles Film Critics Association	1982	Best Actor	My Favorite Year	2nd Place	
National Board of Review	1970	Best Actor	Goodbye, Mr. Chips	Won	
National Board of Review	1972	Best Actor	Man of La Mancha / The Ruling Class	Won	
National Society of Film Critics	1970	Best Actor	Goodbye, Mr. Chips	2nd Place	
National Society of Film Critics	1973	Best Actor	The Ruling Class	3rd Place	
National Society of Film Critics	1981	Best Actor	The Stunt Man	Won	
National Society of Film Critics	1983	Best Actor	My Favorite Year	3rd Place	
National Society of Film Critics	2007	Best Actor	Venus	2nd Place	
New York Film Critics Circle	1968	Best Actor	The Lion in Winter	3rd Place	
New York Film Critics Circle	1980	Best Actor	The Stunt Man	3rd Place	
New York Film Critics Circle	1982	Best Actor	My Favorite Year	3rd Place	
Online Film Critics Society	2007	Best Actor	Venus	Nominated	

== Miscellaneous awards ==
Organizations	Year	Category	Work	Result	Ref.
British Independent Film Awards	2006	Best Actor in a British Independent Film	Venus	Nominated	
CableACE Awards	1987	Best Actor in a Dramatic Series	The Ray Bradbury Theater (Episode: "Banshee")	Won	
David di Donatello	1964	Best Foreign Actor	Lawrence of Arabia	Won	
David di Donatello	1967	Best Foreign Actor	The Night of the Generals	Won	
David di Donatello	1970	Best Foreign Actor	Goodbye, Mr. Chips	Won	
David di Donatello	1988	Best Supporting Actor	The Last Emperor	Won	
DVD Exclusive Awards	2002	Best Actor	Global Heresy	Nominated	
Golden Raspberry Awards	1985	Worst Actor	Supergirl	Nominated	
Golden Raspberry Awards	1987	Worst Supporting Actor	Club Paradise	Nominated	
International Antalya Film Festival	2005	Lifetime Achievement Award	—N/a	Won	
Irish Film & Television Academy	2004	Best Actor in a Supporting Role – Film/TV	Troy	Won	
Irish Film & Television Academy	2009	Best Actor in a Supporting Role in Television	The Tudors	Nominated	
Irish Film & Television Academy	2009	Best Actor in a Supporting Role in a Film	Dean Spanley	Won	
Laurel Awards	1963	Top Male Dramatic Performance	Lawrence of Arabia	4th Place	
Laurel Awards	1963	Top New Male Personality	Lawrence of Arabia	Won	
Laurel Awards	1965	Dramatic Performance – Male	Becket	4th Place	
Laurel Awards	1965	Male Star	—N/a	10th Place	
Laurel Awards	1970	Male Star	—N/a	13th Place	
Monte-Carlo Television Festival	2009	Outstanding Actor – Drama Series	The Tudors	Nominated	
New Zealand Film and TV Award	2009	Best Supporting Actor in a Feature Film	Dean Spanley	Won	
Sant Jordi Awards	1965	Best Performance in a Foreign Film	Becket	Won	
Sant Jordi Awards	1984	Best Foreign Actor (Mejor Actor Extranjero)	My Favorite Year	Won	
Satellite Awards	2006	Best Actor – Motion Picture Musical or Comedy	Venus	Nominated	

== Honorary awards ==
Organizations	Year	Award	Result	Ref.
Academy Awards	2002	Honorary Academy Award	Honored	
Cairo International Film Festival	1999	Lifetime Achievement Award	Honored	
Las Vegas Film Critics Society	2006	Lifetime Achievement Award	Honored	
