= Peter O'Toole on screen and stage =

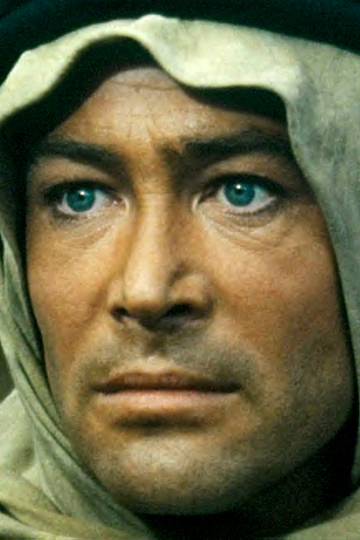
Peter O'Toole as T. E. Lawrence in Lawrence of Arabia (1962)

Peter Seamus O'Toole (1932 – 2013) was an English and Irish actor of stage and screen who achieved film stardom in 1962 playing T. E. Lawrence in Lawrence of Arabia.

== Honours and awards ==
He went on to become one of the most honoured film and stage actors of his time. He won an Honorary Oscar in 2002, but holds the record for most competitive Academy Award nominations for an actor without winning, going winless in eight attempts.

== Film ==
Year	Title	Role	Notes
1960	Kidnapped	Robin MacGregor	
1960	The Savage Innocents	First Trooper	
1960	The Day They Robbed the Bank of England	Capt. Monty Fitch	
1962	Lawrence of Arabia	T. E. Lawrence	
1964	Becket	Henry II of England	
1965	Lord Jim	Lord Jim	
1965	What's New, Pussycat?	Michael James	
1965	The Sandpiper	Unknown	Voice; Uncredited
1966	How to Steal a Million	Simon Dermott	
1966	The Bible: In the Beginning...	The Three Angels	
1967	The Night of the Generals	Gen. Wilhelm Tanz	
1967	Casino Royale	Scottish Piper	Uncredited
1968	The Lion in Winter	Henry II of England	
1968	Great Catherine	Capt. Charles Edstaston	
1969	Stiletto	Man at Premier	Uncredited
1969	Goodbye, Mr. Chips	Arthur Chipping	
1970	Country Dance	Sir Charles Ferguson	
1971	Murphy's War	Murphy	
1971	Under Milk Wood	Capt. Tom Cat	
1972	The Ruling Class	Jack Gurney, 14th Earl of Gurney	
1972	Man of La Mancha	Don Quixote / Miguel de Cervantes / Alonso Quijano	
1975	Rosebud	Larry Martin	
1975	Man Friday	Robinson Crusoe	
1976	Foxtrot	Liviu	
1976	Rogue Male	Sir Robert Hunter	
1978	Power Play	Col. Zeller	
1979	Caligula	Tiberius	
1979	Zulu Dawn	Frederic Thesiger, 2nd Baron Chelmsford	
1980	The Stunt Man	Eli Cross	
1982	My Favorite Year	Alan Swann	
1984	Supergirl	Zaltar	
1985	Creator	Dr. Harry Wolper	
1986	Club Paradise	Gov. Anthony Cloyden Hayes	
1987	The Last Emperor	Reginald Johnston	
1988	High Spirits	Peter Plunkett	
1989	Crystal or Ash, Fire or Wind, as Long as It's Love	Prof. Yan McShoul	
1990	Wings of Fame	Cesar Valentin	
1990	The Rainbow Thief	Prince Meleagre	
1990	The Nutcracker Prince	Pantaloon	Voice
1991	King Ralph	Sir Cedric Charles Willingham	
1991	Isabelle Eberhardt	Maj. Lyautey	
1992	Rebecca's Daughters	Lord Sarn	
1993	The Seventh Coin	Emil Saber	
1997	FairyTale: A True Story	Arthur Conan Doyle	
1998	Phantoms	Dr. Timothy Flyte	
1999	The Manor	Mr. Ravenscroft	
1999	Molokai: The Story of Father Damien	William Williamson	
2002	Global Heresy	Lord Charles Foxley	
2002	The Final Curtain	J.J. Curtis	
2003	Bright Young Things	Col. Blount	
2004	Troy	Priam	
2005	Lassie	The Duke	
2005	Mystic India	Narrator	Voice
2006	Venus	Maurice	
2006	One Night with the King	Samuel	
2007	Ratatouille	Anton Ego	Voice
2007	Stardust	King of Stormhold	
2008	Dean Spanley	Fisk Senior	
2008	Christmas Cottage	Glen Wesman	
2010	Eager to Die	Lord Pelican	
2012	Eldorado	Narrator	Voice; Direct-to-video
2012	For Greater Glory	Father Christopher	
2014	Decline of an Empire	Cornelius Gallus	Posthumous release; Direct-to-video
2015	Diamond Cartel	Tugboat	Posthumous release; Overdubbed

== Television ==
Year	Title	Role	Notes
1956	The Adventures of the Scarlet Pimpernel	First Soldier	Episode: "A Tale of Two Pigtails"
1961	Rendezvous	John	3 episodes
1968	Present Laughter	Garry Essendine	Television film
1976	Rogue Male	Sir Robert Hunter	Television film
1980	Strumpet City	Jim Larkin	Miniseries
1981	Masada	General Cornelius Flavius Silva	Miniseries
1982	Man and Superman	Jack Tanner	Television film
1983	Pygmalion	Professor Henry Higgins	Television film
1983	Sherlock Holmes and a Study in Scarlet	Sherlock Holmes	Voice; Television film
1983	Sherlock Holmes and the Sign of Four	Sherlock Holmes	Voice; Television film
1983	Sherlock Holmes and the Baskerville Curse	Sherlock Holmes	Voice; Television film
1983	Sherlock Holmes and the Valley of Fear	Sherlock Holmes	Voice; Television film
1983	Svengali	Anton Bosnyak	Television film
1984	Kim	Lama	Television film
1986	The Ray Bradbury Theater	John Hampton	Episode: "Banshee"
1989	The Dark Angel	Silas	Television adaptation of Uncle Silas
1990	Crossing to Freedom	John Sidney Howard	Television film
1992	Civvies	Barry Newman	Miniseries
1994	Heaven & Hell: North & South, Book III	Sam Trump	Miniseries
1995	Heavy Weather	Clarence, Earl of Emsworth	Television film
1996	Gulliver's Travels	Emperor of Lilliput	Miniseries
1998	Coming Home	Colonel Carey-Lewis	Miniseries
1999	Joan of Arc	Bishop Cauchon	Miniseries
1999	Jeffrey Bernard is Unwell	Jeffrey Bernard	Television film
2002	The Education of Max Bickford	Sidney McKnight	Episode: "One More Time"
2003	Hitler: The Rise of Evil	President Paul von Hindenburg	Miniseries
2003	Imperium: Augustus	Augustus Caesar	Miniseries
2005	Casanova	Older Casanova	Miniseries
2008	The Tudors	Pope Paul III	7 episodes
2008	Iron Road	Lionel Relic	Miniseries

== Theatre ==
Year	Title	Role	Venue
1956	King Lear	Cornwall	Bristol Old Vic
1956	The Recruiting Officer	Bullock	Bristol Old Vic
1956	Major Barbara	Peter Shirley	Bristol Old Vic
1956	Othello	Lodovico	Bristol Old Vic
1956	The Slave of Truth	Clitandre	Bristol Old Vic
1957	Pygmalion	Henry Higgins	Bristol Old Vic
1957	A Midsummer Night's Dream	Lysander	Bristol Old Vic
1957	Oh! My Papa!	Uncle Gustave	Bristol Old Vic
1957	Look Back in Anger	Jimmy Porter	Bristol Old Vic
1957	Waiting for Godot	Vladimir	Bristol Old Vic
1958	Man and Superman	Tanner	Bristol Old Vic
1958	Hamlet	Hamlet	Bristol Old Vic
1958	The Holiday	Roger	Bristol Old Vic
1958	Amphitryon '38	Jupiter	Bristol Old Vic
1959	The Long and the Short and the Tall	Bamforth	Royal Court Theatre, London
1960	The Taming of the Shrew	Petruchio	Shakespeare Memorial Theatre, Stratford
1960	The Merchant of Venice	Shylock	Shakespeare Memorial Theatre, Stratford
1960	Troilus and Cressida	Thersites	Shakespeare Memorial Theatre, Stratford
1963	Hamlet	Hamlet	Royal National Theatre, London
1963	Baal	Baal	Phoenix Theatre, West End
1965	Ride a Cock Horse	Peter	Piccadilly Theatre, West End
1966	Juno and the Paycock	Jack Boyle	Gaiety Theatre, Dublin
1966	Man and Superman	Tanner	Gaiety Theatre, Dublin
1969	Waiting for Godot	Vladimir	Abbey Theatre, Dublin
1973	Uncle Vanya	Vanya	Bristol Old Vic
1973	Plunder	D'Arcy Tuck	Bristol Old Vic
1974	The Apple Cart	King Magnus	Bristol Old Vic
1974	Judgement	Monologue	Bristol Old Vic
1978	Uncle Vanya	Vanya	Royal Alexandra Theatre, Toronto
1978	Uncle Vanya	Dr. Astrov	North American Tour
1978	Present Laughter	Gary Essendine	North American Tour
1980	Macbeth	Macbeth	The Old Vic, London
1982	Man and Superman	Tanner	Theatre Royal Haymarket, West End
1984	Pygmalion	Henry Higgins	Shaftesbury Theatre, West End
1986	The Apple Cart	King Magnus	Theatre Royal Haymarket, West End
1987	Pygmalion	Henry Higgins	Plymouth Theatre, Broadway
1989	Jeffrey Bernard Is Unwell	Jeffrey Bernard	Apollo Theatre, West End
1991	Jeffrey Bernard Is Unwell	Jeffrey Bernard	Shaftesbury Theatre, West End
1992	Our Song	Roger Piper	Theatre Royal, Bath
1992–1993	Our Song	Roger Piper	Apollo Theatre, West End
1999	Jeffrey Bernard Is Unwell	Jeffrey Bernard	The Old Vic, London
