= The Prime of Miss Jean Brodie =

The Prime of Miss Jean Brodie can refer to:

- The Prime of Miss Jean Brodie (novel), a 1961 novel by Muriel Spark
- The Prime of Miss Jean Brodie, a 1966 stage play by Jay Presson Allen based on the novel
- The Prime of Miss Jean Brodie (film), a 1969 film based on the novel, starring Maggie Smith
- The Prime of Miss Jean Brodie (TV series), a 1978 TV series based on the novel, starring Geraldine McEwan
- The Prime of Miss Jean Brodie, a 2026 theatrical adaptation by David Harrower for the National Theatre of Scotland.
