= They Shoot Horses, Don't They? (film) =

1969 film by Sydney Pollack

- Theatrical release poster
- Directed by: Sydney Pollack
- Screenplay by: Robert E. Thompson; James Poe
- Based on: They Shoot Horses, Don't They? by Horace McCoy
- Produced by: Robert Chartoff; Irwin Winkler
- Starring: Jane Fonda; Michael Sarrazin; Susannah York; Gig Young; Bonnie Bedelia; Red Buttons
- Cinematography: Philip H. Lathrop
- Edited by: Fredric Steinkamp
- Music by: Johnny Green
- Production companies: ABC Pictures; Palomar Pictures
- Distributed by: Cinerama Releasing Corporation
- Release date: December 10, 1969
- Running time: 120 minutes
- Country: United States
- Language: English
- Budget: $4.86 million
- Box office: $12.6 million

They Shoot Horses, Don't They? is a 1969 American psychological drama film directed by Sydney Pollack, from a screenplay written by Robert E. Thompson and James Poe, based on Horace McCoy's 1935 novel. It stars Jane Fonda, Michael Sarrazin, Susannah York, Gig Young, Bonnie Bedelia, and Red Buttons. It focuses on a disparate group of individuals desperate to win a Depression-era dance marathon and an opportunistic emcee who urges them on.

The film was released theatrically in the United States on December 10, 1969, and also premiered at the 1970 Cannes Film Festival. Reviewers praised its direction, screenplay, depiction of the Depression era, and performances (especially of Fonda, York, and Young). It received nine nominations at the 42nd Academy Awards including: Best Director, Best Actress (for Fonda), Best Supporting Actress (for York), Best Adapted Screenplay, with Young winning for Best Supporting Actor. As of 2025, it holds the record for obtaining the most Oscar nominations without receiving one for Best Picture.

== Plot ==
Robert Syverton, a homeless man, recalls the events leading to an unstated crime. As a boy, he witnessed a horse that had broken its leg being shot to 'put it out of its misery'. Years later, during the Great Depression, he wanders into a dance marathon that is about to begin in a shabby ballroom on the Santa Monica Pier. Couples are competing for a $1,500 cash prize and hoping to be spotted by Hollywood celebrities and talent scouts in the audience. Robert is recruited by Rocky Gravo, the contest's promoter and emcee, to be the partner of a world-weary, bitter young woman named Gloria Beatty, after her previous partner is disqualified for bronchitis. Other contestants include retired sailor Harry Kline, emotionally fragile aspiring London actress Alice LeBlanc, her partner and aspiring actor Joel Girard, and impoverished farmer James Bates and his pregnant wife Ruby.

Early in the marathon, the weaker pairs are eliminated quickly. Rocky observes the vulnerabilities of stronger contestants and exploits them for the audience's amusement. The arena uses quack doctors to cover up the extreme physical and mental damage to participants. Frayed nerves are exacerbated by the theft of one of Alice's dresses (by Rocky, as he later reveals) and Gloria's displeasure over the attention Robert shows Alice. Robert ends up pairing off with Alice, and Gloria takes Joel as her partner, switching to Harry after Joel leaves for a job.

Weeks into the marathon, to spark the spectators' enthusiasm, Rocky stages a series of derbies in which the couples race in tandem around the dance floor, with the last three pairs eliminated. Harry dies of a heart attack in mid-lap, and Gloria avoids elimination by dragging him across the finish line. Rocky "disqualifies" Harry, concealing his death from the audience, and the medics remove his body from the dance floor. When Alice suffers a nervous breakdown, a sympathetic Rocky comforts her and removes her from the competition to receive genuine medical care. Lacking partners, Robert and Gloria team up once again.

Rocky suggests Robert and Gloria get married during the marathon, a publicity stunt guaranteed to earn them cash and gifts from supporters such as Mrs. Laydon, a wealthy woman who sponsors them throughout the contest. When Gloria refuses, Rocky reveals the invoice sheet: expenses will be deducted from the prize money, meaning even if the pair manage to win, they will leave with nothing. Disheartened, Gloria and Robert withdraw from the competition and leave the dance hall.

As the two walk out onto the pier, a despondent Gloria confesses to Robert how empty she feels and that she is tired of life. She takes a gun from her purse and points it at her head, but cannot bring herself to pull the trigger. Desperate, she begs Robert to shoot her, which he does. Police officers arrive to arrest Robert and remove Gloria's body. Asked why he did it, Robert tells the police that she asked him to, adding, "They shoot horses, don't they?" Meanwhile, the marathon continues with the few remaining couples, including James and Ruby, having already reached 1,491 hours. The eventual winners are never revealed.

== Cast ==
- Jane Fonda as Gloria Beatty
- Michael Sarrazin as Robert Syverton
- Susannah York as Alice LeBlanc
- Gig Young as Rocky Gravo
- Red Buttons as Harry Kline (Sailor)
- Bonnie Bedelia as Ruby Bates
- Michael Conrad as Rollo
- Bruce Dern as James Bates
- Al Lewis as "Turkey"
- Robert Fields as Joel Girard
- Severn Darden as Cecil
- Allyn Ann McLerie as Shirl
- Madge Kennedy as Mrs. Laydon
- Jacquelyn Hyde as Jackie
- Felice Orlandi as Mario
- Arthur Metrano as Max
- Paul Mantee as "Jiggs"

== Production ==
=== Development ===
In the early 1950s, Norman Lloyd and Charlie Chaplin were looking for a project on which to collaborate, with Lloyd as director and Chaplin as producer. Lloyd purchased the rights to Horace McCoy's novel for $3,000 and plans to cast Chaplin's son, Sydney and Marilyn Monroe in the leads. Once arrangements were completed, in 1952 Chaplin took his family on what was intended to be a brief trip to the United Kingdom for the London premiere of Limelight. During this trip, in part because Chaplin was accused of being a Communist supporter during the McCarthy era, FBI head J. Edgar Hoover negotiated with the Immigration and Naturalization Service to revoke his re-entry permit and the film project was cancelled. When the rights to the book reverted to McCoy's heirs sixteen years later (he had died in 1955), they refused to renew the deal with Lloyd, since nothing had come of his original plans.

In 1966 film rights were bought by screenwriter James Poe, who wanted to direct. Finance was arranged through Palomar Pictures, whose president was then Edgar Scherick.

Scherick offered the project to the producing team of Bob Chartoff and Irwin Winkler, who were enthusiastic, but felt the script needed a rewrite and that they would struggle to make the film for Scherick's desired budget of $900,000. They also had concerns about Poe's ability as a director and worried that he was too arrogant.

Mia Farrow was interested in starring, but Scherick felt her fee of $500,000 was too high. Eventually it was agreed to show the script to Jane Fonda, who was interested. Michael Sarrazin was borrowed from Universal to play the male lead. Fonda said she was originally unimpressed by the script, but her husband Roger Vadim, who saw similarities between the book and works of the French existentialists, urged her to reconsider.

Scherick eventually agreed to raise the budget to $4 million. Martin Baum became head of ABC Pictures, and Winkler says Baum arranged for Scherick to be fired. Baum wanted the second female lead to be played by Susannah York, though Poe had promised the role to his then-girlfriend Barbara Steele. Winkler says it was Baum who suggested Red Buttons and Gig Young, and pushed for Poe to be fired. The producers were reluctant especially as Jane Fonda liked Poe and had director approval. Winkler arranged for Poe to direct a screen test for Bonnie Bedelia with Fonda; the test did not go well and Fonda became less enthusiastic about Poe's capabilities as a director. Poe was fired from the project. Baum publicly blamed the firing on the fact the script was not ready and the budget was too high.

The main candidates to replace Poe were William Friedkin, Jack Clayton, Larry Peerce, Roger Vadim, Sydney Pollack, and Jack Smight. Clayton admired the novel but wanted to start from scratch which the producer were not willing to do. According to Winkler, Smight wanted $250,000, Friedkin wanted $200,000, and Pollack was willing to do it for $150,000; thus, Pollack got the job.

Meeting with Pollack to discuss the script, Jane Fonda was surprised when he asked for her opinion. She later said, "It was the first time a director asked me for input on how I saw the character and the story." She read the script with a critical eye, made notes on the character, and later observed in her autobiography, "It was a germinal moment [for me] ... This was the first time in my life as an actor that I was working on a film about larger societal issues, and instead of my professional work feeling peripheral to life, it felt relevant." Troubled about problems in her marriage at the time, she drew on her personal anguish to help her with her characterization.

Pollack had the script rewritten by Robert E. Thompson. Warren Beatty originally was considered for the role of Robert Syverton and Pollack's first choice for Rocky was character actor Lionel Stander.

Filming was pushed back from December 1968 to February 1969 to allow for rewrites and recasting. Immediately prior to filming there were rumors Sarazzin would be dropped. Pollack wanted Warren Beatty to play the role instead but Beatty was busy making The Only Game in Town. Universal agreed to waive payment in the delay of the film and Sarazzin kept the role.

=== Filming ===
Filming started February 1969. During filming, there was an issue with York, who wanted a guarantee she would be able to make Country Dance. When this was not forthcoming, it seemed she would have to be replaced and Pollack suggested Sally Kellerman. However, York relented and agreed to make the film.

The film uses the unusual technique of flashforward (glimpses of the future). It occurs throughout the film, as passages appear foreshadowing the fate of Robert, just before the tragic ending. Co-star Young was noted for his deep characterization of Rocky: he patterned his character after the bandleader and radio personality Ben Bernie, and used Bernie's famous catchphrase, "Yowzah! Yowzah! Yowzah!", for the character in the film.

== Soundtrack ==
The film's soundtrack features numerous standards from the era. These include:

- "Easy Come, Easy Go" by Johnny Green and Edward Heyman
- "Sweet Sue, Just You" by Victor Young and Will J. Harris
- "Paradise" by Nacio Herb Brown and Gordon Clifford
- "Coquette" by Johnny Green, Carmen Lombardo, and Gus Kahn
- "The Japanese Sandman" by Richard A. Whiting and Ray Egan
- "By the Beautiful Sea" by Harry Carroll and Harold Atteridge
- "Between the Devil and the Deep Blue Sea" by Harold Arlen and Ted Koehler
- "The Best Things in Life Are Free" by Buddy DeSylva, Lew Brown, and Ray Henderson
- "Body and Soul" by Johnny Green, Edward Heyman, Robert Sour, and Frank Eyton
- "I Cover the Waterfront" by Johnny Green and Edward Heyman
- "Brother, Can You Spare a Dime?" by Jay Gorney and E. Y. Harburg
- "I Found a Million Dollar Baby (in a Five and Ten Cent Store)" by Harry Warren, Billy Rose, and Mort Dixon
- "Out of Nowhere" by Johnny Green and Edward Heyman
- "California, Here I Come" by Buddy DeSylva, Joseph Meyer, and Al Jolson
- "You Oughta Be in Pictures" by Dana Suesse and Edward Heyman
- "You're Getting to Be a Habit with Me" by Harry Warren and Al Dubin

The ballroom band consisted of several professional jazz musicians, all uncredited. The band was led by Bobby Hutcherson and included Hugh Bell, Ronnie Bright, Teddy Buckner, Hadley Caliman, Teddy Edwards, Thurman Green, Joe Harris, Ike Isaacs, Harold Land and Les Robertson.

A soundtrack album was released on ABC Records in 1969.

== Release ==
The film premiered at the Fine Arts Theatre on December 10, 1969.

== Reception ==
=== Box office ===
The film was a box office success, grossing $12.6 million in the United States and Canada on a $4.86 million budget, generating theatrical rentals of $5.98 million, making it the 16th highest-grossing film of 1969. It grossed $28,000 in its opening week.

=== Critical response ===
The film was screened at the 1970 Cannes Film Festival, but was not entered into the main competition. In the United States, the film was applauded for portraying the Depression era.

Roger Ebert gave the film four stars out of four and named it as one of the best American movies of the 1970s:

They Shoot Horses, Don't They? is a masterful re-creation of the [dance] marathon era for audiences that are mostly unfamiliar with it. In addition to everything else it does, Horses holds our attention because it tells us something we didn't know about human nature and American society. It tells us a lot more than that, of course...because it works on this fundamental level as well.

In his review in The New York Times, Vincent Canby said

The movie is far from being perfect, but it is so disturbing in such important ways that I won't forget it very easily, which is more than can be said of much better, more consistent films ... The movie is by far the best thing that Pollack has ever directed (with the possible exception of The Scalphunters). While the cameras remain, as if they had been sentenced, within the ballroom, picking up the details of the increasing despair of the dancers, the movie becomes an epic of exhaustion and futility.

Variety said, "Puffy-eyed, unshaven, reeking of stale liquor, sweat and cigarettes, Young has never looked older or acted better. Fonda ... gives a dramatic performance that gives the film a personal focus and an emotionally gripping power."

Stanley Kauffmann of The New Republic described the film as "quite hollow".

TV Guide rated the film four out of a possible four stars and said

Although it is at times heavy-handed, They Shoot Horses, Don't They? is a tour de force of acting. Fonda here got her first chance to prove herself as a serious, dramatic actress ... Young is superb in his role, a sharp switch from his usual bon vivant parts ... Pollack does one of his best jobs of directing, even if his primary strength lies in his rapport with actors. The look of the film is just right and Pollack skillfully evokes the ratty atmosphere amid which explosive emotions come to a boil ... [It] remains a suitably glum yet cathartic film experience.

In 1996, Steve Simels of Entertainment Weekly observed, "Sydney Pollack's dance-marathon movie has probably aged better than any American film of its time."

On the review aggregator website Rotten Tomatoes, 82% of 34 critics' reviews are positive.

=== Accolades ===
Award	Category	Nominee(s)	Result	Ref.
Academy Awards	Best Director	Sydney Pollack	Nominated	
Academy Awards	Best Actress	Jane Fonda	Nominated	
Academy Awards	Best Supporting Actor	Gig Young	Won	
Academy Awards	Best Supporting Actress	Susannah York	Nominated	
Academy Awards	Best Screenplay – Based on Material from Another Medium	James Poe and Robert E. Thompson	Nominated	
Academy Awards	Best Art Direction	Art Direction: Harry Horner; Set Decoration: Frank R. McKelvy	Nominated	
Academy Awards	Best Costume Design	Donfeld	Nominated	
Academy Awards	Best Film Editing	Fredric Steinkamp	Nominated	
Academy Awards	Best Score of a Musical Picture – Original or Adaptation	Johnny Green and Albert Woodbury	Nominated	
Belgian Film Critics Association Awards	Grand Prix	Sydney Pollack	Won	
British Academy Film Awards	Best Actress in a Leading Role	Jane Fonda	Nominated	
British Academy Film Awards	Best Actor in a Supporting Role	Gig Young	Nominated	
British Academy Film Awards	Best Actress in a Supporting Role	Susannah York	Won	
British Academy Film Awards	Best Screenplay	James Poe and Robert E. Thompson	Nominated	
British Academy Film Awards	Best Film Editing	Fredric Steinkamp	Nominated	
British Academy Film Awards	Most Promising Newcomer to Leading Film Roles	Michael Sarrazin	Nominated	
Directors Guild of America Awards	Outstanding Directorial Achievement in Motion Pictures	Sydney Pollack	Nominated	
Fotogramas de Plata	Best Foreign Movie Performer	Jane Fonda	3rd Place	
Golden Globe Awards	Best Motion Picture – Drama		Nominated	
Golden Globe Awards	Best Actress in a Motion Picture – Drama	Jane Fonda	Nominated	
Golden Globe Awards	Best Supporting Actor – Motion Picture	Red Buttons	Nominated	
Golden Globe Awards	Best Supporting Actor – Motion Picture	Gig Young	Won	
Golden Globe Awards	Best Supporting Actress – Motion Picture	Susannah York	Nominated	
Golden Globe Awards	Best Director – Motion Picture	Sydney Pollack	Nominated	
Kansas City Film Critics Circle Awards	Best Actress	Jane Fonda	Won	
Kansas City Film Critics Circle Awards	Best Supporting Actor	Gig Young	Won	
Nastro d'Argento	Best Foreign Director	Sydney Pollack	Nominated	
National Board of Review Awards	Best Film		Won	
National Board of Review Awards	Top Ten Films		Won	
National Society of Film Critics Awards	Best Actress	Jane Fonda	Runner-up	
New York Film Critics Circle Awards	Best Actress	Jane Fonda	Won	
New York Film Critics Circle Awards	Best Supporting Actor	Gig Young	Nominated	
Taormina International Film Festival	Golden Charybdis	Sydney Pollack	Won	
Turkish Film Critics Association Awards	Best Foreign Film		3rd Place	
Writers Guild of America Awards	Best Drama – Adapted from Another Medium	James Poe and Robert E. Thompson	Nominated	

== Home media ==
They Shoot Horses, Don't They? was released on DVD by Anchor Bay Entertainment in 1999. It was later reissued on DVD by MGM Home Entertainment on October 19, 2004. Kino Lorber released the film for the first time on Blu-ray on September 5, 2017.

== Legacy ==
Turner Classic Movies observed, "By popularizing the title of McCoy's novel, [the film] gave American argot a catch-phrase that's as recognizable today as when the movie first caught on." The 1977 Chic song "Dance, Dance, Dance (Yowsah, Yowsah, Yowsah)" was inspired by the film.

The video for Sophie Ellis Bextor’s 2001 hit single Murder on the Dancefloor was inspired by the film.

A 2002 episode entitled “They Shoot Gilmores, Don’t They?” of the television show Gilmore Girls featured a dance marathon and dramatic interpersonal stakes between contestants.

A 2007 episode of the television show It's Always Sunny in Philadelphia entitled "The Gang Dances Their Asses Off" features a dance marathon where the main characters must dance to save their bar, and manipulation and mind games ensue between the dancers.

== See also ==
- List of American films of 1969
- The Long Walk, a novel by Stephen King

== Sources ==
- Fonda, Jane (2006). My Life So Far. New York City, New York: Random House. ISBN 978-0-812-97576-5.
