= National Board of Review Awards 1969 =

Annual US film awards ceremony

41st National Board of Review Awards

January 1, 1970

The 41st National Board of Review Awards were announced on January 1, 1970.

== Top Ten Films ==
1. They Shoot Horses, Don't They?
2. Ring of Bright Water
3. Topaz
4. Goodbye, Mr. Chips
5. Battle of Britain
6. Isadora
7. The Prime of Miss Jean Brodie
8. Support Your Local Sheriff!
9. True Grit
10. Midnight Cowboy

== Top Foreign Films ==
1. Shame
2. Stolen Kisses
3. The Damned
4. La Femme Infidèle
5. Ådalen 31

== Winners ==
- Best Film: They Shoot Horses, Don't They?
- Best Foreign Film: Shame
- Best Actor: Peter O'Toole (Goodbye, Mr. Chips)
- Best Actress: Geraldine Page (Trilogy)
- Best Supporting Actor: Philippe Noiret (Topaz)
- Best Supporting Actress: Pamela Franklin (The Prime of Miss Jean Brodie)
- Best Director: Alfred Hitchcock (Topaz)
