= Albert Woodbury =

American composer and orchestrator

- Born: Albert Francis Woodbury; July 1, 1909; Los Angeles, California, U.S.
- Died: May 26, 1989 (aged 79); Los Angeles, California, U.S.
- Occupation(s): Composer, orchestrator

Albert Francis Woodbury (July 1, 1909 – May 26, 1989) was an American composer and orchestrator. He was nominated for an Academy Award in the category Best Original Score for the film They Shoot Horses, Don't They?.

Woodbury died in May 1989 of cancer in Los Angeles, California, at the age of 79.

== Selected filmography ==
- They Shoot Horses, Don't They? (1969; co-nominated with Johnny Green)
