= 27th Golden Globe Awards =

Film award ceremony in 1970

- Date: February 2, 1970

The 27th Golden Globe Awards, honoring the best in film and television for 1969, were held on February 2, 1970.

== Winners and nominees ==
=== Film ===
Best Motion Picture
Drama	Comedy or Musical
Anne of the Thousand Days; Butch Cassidy and the Sundance Kid; Midnight Cowboy; The Prime of Miss Jean Brodie; They Shoot Horses, Don't They?	The Secret of Santa Vittoria; Cactus Flower; Goodbye, Columbus; Hello, Dolly!; Paint Your Wagon
Best Performance in a Motion Picture – Drama
Actor	Actress
John Wayne - True Grit as Rooster Cogburn; Alan Arkin - Popi as Abraham "Popi" Rodriguez; Richard Burton - Anne of the Thousand Days as King Henry VIII; Dustin Hoffman - Midnight Cowboy as Enrico "Ratso" Rizzo; Jon Voight - Midnight Cowboy as Joe Buck	Geneviève Bujold - Anne of the Thousand Days as Anne Boleyn; Jane Fonda - They Shoot Horses, Don't They? as Gloria Beatty; Liza Minnelli - The Sterile Cuckoo as Pookie Adams; Jean Simmons - The Happy Ending as Mary Wilson; Maggie Smith - The Prime of Miss Jean Brodie as Jean Brodie
Best Performance in a Motion Picture – Comedy or Musical
Actor	Actress
Peter O'Toole - Goodbye, Mr. Chips as Arthur Chipping; Dustin Hoffman - John and Mary as John; Lee Marvin - Paint Your Wagon as Ben Rumson; Steve McQueen - The Reivers as Boom Hogganbeck; Anthony Quinn - The Secret of Santa Vittoria as Italo Bombolini	Patty Duke - Me, Natalie as Natalie Miller; Ingrid Bergman - Cactus Flower as Stephanie Dickinson; Dyan Cannon - Bob & Carol & Ted & Alice as Alice Henderson; Kim Darby - Generation as Doris Bolton Owen; Mia Farrow - John and Mary as Mary; Shirley MacLaine - Sweet Charity as Charity Hope Valentine; Anna Magnani - The Secret of Santa Vittoria as Rose Bombolini; Barbra Streisand - Hello, Dolly! as Dolly Levi
Best Supporting Performance in a Motion Picture – Drama, Comedy or Musical
Supporting Actor	Supporting Actress
Gig Young - They Shoot Horses, Don't They? as Rocky; Red Buttons - They Shoot Horses, Don't They? as Sailor; Jack Nicholson - Easy Rider as George Hanson; Anthony Quayle - Anne of the Thousand Days as Cardinal Thomas Wolsey; Mitch Vogel - The Reivers as Lucius McCaslin	Goldie Hawn - Cactus Flower as Toni Simmons; Marianne McAndrew - Hello, Dolly! as Irene Molloy; Siân Phillips - Goodbye, Mr. Chips as Ursula Mossbank; Brenda Vaccaro - Midnight Cowboy as Shirley; Susannah York - They Shoot Horses, Don't They? as Alice LeBlanc
Other
Best Director	Best Screenplay
Charles Jarrott - Anne of the Thousand Days; Gene Kelly - Hello, Dolly!; Stanley Kramer - The Secret of Santa Vittoria; Sydney Pollack - They Shoot Horses, Don't They?; John Schlesinger - Midnight Cowboy	Anne of the Thousand Days - Bridget Boland, John Hale and Richard Sokolove; Butch Cassidy and the Sundance Kid - William Goldman; If It's Tuesday, This Must Be Belgium - David Shaw; John and Mary - John Mortimer; Midnight Cowboy - Waldo Salt
Best Original Score	Best Original Song
Butch Cassidy and the Sundance Kid - Burt Bacharach; Anne of the Thousand Days - Georges Delerue; Goodbye, Mr. Chips - Leslie Bricusse; The Happy Ending- Michel Legrand; The Secret of Santa Vittoria- Ernest Gold	"Jean" (Rod McKuen) - The Prime of Miss Jean Brodie; "Goodbye, Columbus" (The Association) - Goodbye, Columbus; "Raindrops Keep Falling on My Head" (Burt Bacharach, Hal David) - Butch Cassidy and the Sundance Kid; "Stay" (Ernest Gold, Norman Gimbel) - The Secret of Santa Vittoria; "True Grit" (Elmer Bernstein, Don Black) - True Grit; "What Are You Doing the Rest of Your Life?" (Michel Legrand, Alan and Marilyn Bergman) - The Happy Ending
Best Foreign Film (English Language)	Best Foreign Film (Foreign Language)
Oh! What a Lovely War (United Kingdom); The Assassination Bureau (United Kingdom); If.... (United Kingdom); The Italian Job (United Kingdom); Mayerling (France)	Z (Algeria); Ådalen 31 (Sweden); The Big Dig (Israel); Fellini Satyricon (Italy); Girls in the Sun (Greece)
New Star of the Year – Actor	New Star of the Year – Actress
Jon Voight - Midnight Cowboy as Joe Buck; Helmut Berger - The Damned as Martin von Essenbeck; Glen Campbell - True Grit as La Boeuf; Michael Douglas - Hail, Hero! as Carl Dixon; George Lazenby - On Her Majesty's Secret Service as James Bond	Ali MacGraw - Goodbye, Columbus as Brenda Patimkin; Dyan Cannon - Bob & Carol & Ted & Alice as Alice Henderson; Goldie Hawn - Cactus Flower as Toni Simmons; Marianne McAndrew - Hello, Dolly! as Irene Molloy; Brenda Vaccaro - Where It's At as Molly

The following films received multiple nominations:

Nominations	Title
7	Anne of the Thousand Days
7	Midnight Cowboy
6	The Secret of Santa Vittoria
6	They Shoot Horses, Don't They?
5	Hello, Dolly!
4	Butch Cassidy and the Sundance Kid
3	Cactus Flower
3	Goodbye, Columbus
3	Goodbye, Mr. Chips
3	The Happy Ending
3	John and Mary
3	The Prime of Miss Jean Brodie
3	True Grit
2	Bob & Carol & Ted & Alice
2	Paint Your Wagon
2	The Reivers

The following films received multiple wins:

Wins	Title
4	Anne of the Thousand Days

=== Television ===
Best Television Series
Drama	Musical or Comedy
Marcus Welby, M.D.: Bracken's World; Mannix; The Mod Squad; Room 222	The Carol Burnett Show: The Glen Campbell Goodtime Hour; The Governor & J.J.; Love, American Style; Rowan & Martin's Laugh-In
Best Performance in a Television Series Drama
Actor	Actress
Mike Connors - Mannix as Joe Mannix: Peter Graves - Mission: Impossible as Jim Phelps; Lloyd Haynes - Room 222 as Pete Dixion; Robert Wagner - It Takes a Thief as Alexander Mundy; Robert Young - Marcus Welby, M.D. as Dr. Marcus Welby	Linda Cristal - The High Chaparral as Victoria Montoya: Amanda Blake - Gunsmoke as Miss Kitty Russell; Peggy Lipton - The Mod Squad as Julie Barnes; Denise Nicholas - Room 222 as Miss Liz McIntyre; Eleanor Parker - Bracken's World as Sylvia Caldwell
Best Performance in a Television Series – Musical or Comedy
Actor	Actress
Dan Dailey - The Governor & J.J. as William Drinkwater: Glen Campbell - The Glen Campbell Goodtime Hour as Himself; Tom Jones - This Is Tom Jones as Himself; Dean Martin - The Dean Martin Show as Himself; Jim Nabors - The Jim Nabors Hour as Himself	Carol Burnett - The Carol Burnett Show as Various Characters Julie Sommars - The Governor & J.J. as Jennifer Jo Drinkwater: Lucille Ball - Here's Lucy as Lucy Carter; Diahann Carroll - Julia as Julia Baker; Barbara Eden - I Dream of Jeannie as Jeannie; Debbie Reynolds - The Debbie Reynolds Show as Debbie Thompson

The following programs received multiple nominations:

Nominations	Title
3	The Governor & J.J.
3	Room 222
2	Bracken's World
2	The Carol Burnett Show
2	The Glen Campbell Goodtime Hour
2	Mannix
2	Marcus Welby, M.D.
2	The Mod Squad

The following programs received multiple wins:

Wins	Title
2	The Carol Burnett Show
2	The Governor & J.J.

=== Cecil B. DeMille Award ===
Joan Crawford
