= Robert E. Thompson (screenwriter) =

American screenwriter

- Born: November 3, 1924; United States
- Died: February 11, 2004 (aged 79); United States
- Occupation: Screenwriter

Robert E. Thompson (November 3, 1924 – February 11, 2004) was an American screenwriter.

Thompson was known for such films as The Trial of Lee Harvey Oswald, A Case of Rape and They Shoot Horses, Don't They?

He was nominated for an Academy Award for They Shoot Horses, Don't They?

== Filmography ==
Year	Title	Role	Notes
1990	Astonished	Doc Wop Group #1	(final film role)
