= 1969 National Society of Film Critics Awards =

Annual US film award ceremony

4th NSFC Awards

January 5, 1970

Best Film:
Z

The 4th National Society of Film Critics Awards, given on 5 January 1970, honored the best filmmaking of 1969.

The member critics voting for the awards were Hollis Alpert of the Saturday Review, Harold Clurman of The Nation, Jay Cocks of Time, Brad Darrach of Movie, Penelope Gilliatt of The New Yorker, Pauline Kael of The New Yorker, Stefan Kanfer of Time, Stanley Kauffmann of The New Republic, Robert Kotlowitz of Harper's Magazine, Joseph Morgenstern of Newsweek, Andrew Sarris of The Village Voice, Richard Schickel of Life, Arthur M. Schlesinger, Jr. of Vogue, and John Simon of The New Leader.

== Winners ==
=== Best Picture ===
- Z (21 points)

2. Stolen Kisses (11 points)
3. The Unfaithful Wife (10 points)

=== Best Director ===
- François Truffaut – Stolen Kisses (12 points)

2. Costa-Gavras – Z (11 points)
3. Claude Chabrol – The Unfaithful Wife (9 points)
3. Miklós Jancsó – The Red and the White (9 points)

=== Best Actor ===
- Jon Voight – Midnight Cowboy (18 points)

2. Peter O'Toole – Goodbye, Mr. Chips (14 points)
3. Michel Bouquet – The Unfaithful Wife (9 points)
3. Robert Redford – Downhill Racer and Butch Cassidy and the Sundance Kid (9 points)

=== Best Actress ===
- Vanessa Redgrave – The Loves of Isadora (24 points)

2. Jane Fonda – They Shoot Horses, Don't They? (16 points)
3. Verna Bloom – Medium Cool (5 points)
3. Maggie Smith – The Prime of Miss Jean Brodie (5 points)
3. Ingrid Thulin – The Damned (5 points)

=== Best Supporting Actor ===
- Jack Nicholson – Easy Rider (majority vote – 1st ballot)

=== Best Supporting Actress (tie) ===
- Delphine Seyrig – Stolen Kisses (13 points)
- Siân Phillips – Goodbye, Mr. Chips (13 points)

3. Verna Bloom – Medium Cool (12 points)
3. Dyan Cannon – Bob & Carol & Ted & Alice (12 points)
3. Celia Johnson – The Prime of Miss Jean Brodie

=== Best Screenplay ===
- Paul Mazursky and Larry Tucker – Bob & Carol & Ted & Alice (22 points)

2. Costa-Gavras and Jorge Semprún – Z (18 points)
3. Alvin Sargent – The Sterile Cuckoo (6 points)

=== Best Cinematography ===
- Lucien Ballard – The Wild Bunch (16 points)

2. Miroslav Ondricek – If.... (11 points)
3. Haskell Wexler – Medium Cool (8 points)

=== Special awards ===
- Ivan Passer for Intimate Lighting, "a first film of great originality."
- Dennis Hopper "for his achievements in Easy Rider as director, co-writer and co-star."
