= The Prime of Miss Jean Brodie (film) =

1969 British film by Ronald Neame

- Theatrical release poster, artwork by Ted CoConis
- Directed by: Ronald Neame
- Screenplay by: Jay Presson Allen
- Based on: The Prime of Miss Jean Brodie by Muriel Spark
- Produced by: James Cresson; Robert Fryer
- Starring: Maggie Smith; Robert Stephens; Pamela Franklin; Gordon Jackson; Celia Johnson
- Cinematography: Ted Moore
- Edited by: Norman Savage
- Music by: Rod McKuen
- Distributed by: 20th Century-Fox
- Release date: 24 February 1969
- Running time: 116 minutes
- Country: United Kingdom
- Language: English
- Budget: $2.76 million
- Box office: $3 million (rentals)

The Prime of Miss Jean Brodie is a 1969 British drama film directed by Ronald Neame from a screenplay written by Jay Presson Allen, adapted from her own stage play, which was in turn based on the 1961 novel by Muriel Spark. The film stars Maggie Smith in the title role as an unrestrained teacher at a girls' school in Edinburgh. Celia Johnson, Robert Stephens, Pamela Franklin, and Gordon Jackson are featured in supporting roles.

The Prime of Miss Jean Brodie premiered at the 1969 Cannes Film Festival, where it competed for the Palme d'Or and was released in UK cinemas on 24 February 1969 and in the US on 2 March 1969. Although the film received positive reviews with Smith's performance being acclaimed, it was a box office disappointment, grossing $3 million on a $2.76 million budget. At the 42nd Academy Awards, Smith won the Academy Award for Best Actress for her performance, and the film was also nominated for Best Original Song for its theme song "Jean".

== Plot ==
Jean Brodie is a teacher at The Marcia Blaine School for Girls in Edinburgh in the 1930s. Brodie is known for her tendency to stray from the school's curriculum, to romanticise fascist leaders such as Benito Mussolini and Francisco Franco, and to believe herself to be in the prime of life—in particular, her sexual prime. Brodie devotes her energy and attention to girls she sees as special or mouldable, who are referred to as the "Brodie Set". At the film's outset, the Brodie Set is composed of four 12-year-old junior school girls: Sandy, Monica, Jenny, and Mary.

The Brodie Set often go to art museums and theatre and have picnics on the school lawn, to the chagrin of the school's austere headmistress Emmaline Mackay. Miss Mackay dislikes that the girls are cultured to the exclusion of hard knowledge and seem precocious for their age. She has a grudge against Brodie, who has tenure and was hired six years before Mackay became headmistress. Brodie boasts to her girls that the only way she will stop teaching at Marcia Blaine is if she is assassinated.

Brodie catches the eye of Gordon Lowther, the school's music teacher and choirmaster, with whom she and the girls spend weekends at his luxurious estate in Cramond. Brodie sometimes spends the night with Lowther, though she tries to conceal this from the girls. Lowther wishes to marry Brodie, but she still has feelings for the school's art teacher Teddy Lloyd, an ex-lover of Brodie's who steadily pursues her, although he is a married man with children.

As the Brodie Set grow older and progress closer to the senior school, they frequent Teddy Lloyd's studio, where he paints Jenny's portrait. Sandy initially rebuffs a lecherous advance from Lloyd. However, when Brodie tries to manoeuvre Jenny and Lloyd into an affair, and Sandy into spying on them, it is Sandy, resentful of Brodie's constant praise of Jenny's beauty, who becomes Lloyd's lover and muse. Sandy ends the affair because of Lloyd's continuing obsession with Brodie.

Mary, influenced by Brodie, leaves the school to join her brother, whom she believes to be fighting for Franco in the Spanish Civil War. She is killed shortly after crossing the frontier when the train she is on is attacked. This incites Sandy to tell the headmistress of Brodie's efforts to impose her politics on her students. The disclosure finally leads to Brodie's termination, her humiliation compounded by Lowther's engagement to another teacher.

Before Brodie's departure, Sandy confronts her about her manipulation of Mary, Mary's senseless death, and the harmful influence she exerted on other girls, adding that Mary's brother is actually fighting for the Spanish Republicans. Brodie responds with a series of harsh but astute comments about Sandy's character, particularly her ability to coldly judge and destroy others. Sandy retorts that Brodie professed to be an admirer of conquerors and walks out of the classroom. Brodie runs after her and screams down the hallway, "Assassin!"

Sandy, Monica, and Jenny graduate and leave the school. As Sandy departs, her face streaked with tears, Brodie's voice is heard proclaiming her oft-repeated motto: "Little girls, I am in the business of putting old heads on young shoulders, and all my pupils are the crème de la crème. Give me a girl at an impressionable age, and she is mine for life."

== Cast ==
- Maggie Smith as Jean Brodie
- Robert Stephens as Teddy Lloyd
- Pamela Franklin as Sandy
- Gordon Jackson as Gordon Lowther
- Jane Carr as Mary McGregor
- Shirley Steedman as Monica
- Diane Grayson as Jenny
- Celia Johnson as Miss Mackay
- Margo Cunningham as Miss Campbell
- Isla Cameron as Miss McKenzie
- Molly Weir as Miss Allison Kerr
- Helena Gloag as Miss Ellen Kerr
- Rona Anderson as Miss Lockhart
- Ann Way as Miss Gaunt

The cast included two pairs of married actors: Maggie Smith and Robert Stephens, and Gordon Jackson and Rona Anderson. Julie Andrews was initially offered the role of Jean Brodie.

== Relationship to novel and play ==
There is a complex relationship among the novel, play, film and television series. Jay Presson Allen wrote the stage and screen plays, and was involved with the STV series.

The play, film and TV series focus on Miss Brodie. But the novel focuses on Sister Helen of the Transfiguration. It opens with the former Sandy Stranger being interviewed about the book she has just published that has electrified the literary community. What were the influences in her life that enabled her to write such a great work on theology? Was it Calvin? Someone else? The novel then reviews Sandy/Sister Helen's life, as if it passes before her mind's eye in the time it takes to formulate an answer to the journalist's question. We finish in the present tense of Sister Helen's interview, as she identifies the key influence of her life by saying, "There was a Miss Jean Brodie – in her prime."

Allen created a successful play out of a novel that was challenging to adapt, first, because it is very short, but mainly because the novel is very introspective and internally-focused - making it excellent for the silent reader but difficult to externalise in production media like theatre, film and television. Vanessa Redgrave triumphed in the lead role in London, as did Zoe Caldwell in New York City. Vincent Canby wrote "Jay Presson Allen...created a much better play than is generally recognized. Roles like that of Miss Jean Brodie don't often write themselves". However, some critics have questioned whether the play is a particularly faithful adaptation. They have suggested that it turned an experimental work into a realistic one and removed some theological issues, turning the final product into a story of failed love (and failed fascist politics).

The play reduced the number of girls in the Brodie Set from six to four (and discarded another girl not in the set) and some of them are composites of girls in the novel. Mary is a composite of the original Mary and Joyce Emily; although mainly based on the original Mary, it was Joyce Emily in the novel who died in the Spanish Civil War (Mary later dies in a fire) and rather more is made of this incident in the play than in the novel. Jenny is a composite of the original Jenny and Rose; in spite of her name she has more in common with Rose whom, in the novel, Miss Brodie tried to manoeuvre into having an affair with Mr Lloyd.

The novel made extensive use of flash forward. The play largely dropped this device, but it includes a few scenes showing Sandy as a nun in later life. The film, which made a few changes from the play, discarded these scenes in favor of a linear narrative.

== Reception and accolades ==
=== Box office ===
According to Fox records the film required $5,400,000 in rentals to break even and by 11 December 1970 had made $6,650,000. In September 1970 the studio reported it had made a profit of $831,000 on the film.

=== Critical response ===
The Monthly Film Bulletin wrote: "Somewhat sadly, in bringing Miss Brodie's prime to the screen, Jay Presson Allen has turned not to Muriel Spark's novella but to her own stage version of it; and the result, predictably, is a dramatisation of a dramatisation, a succession of scénes-a-faire and telling monologues which provide a field day for the principal performers at the expense of that elusive irony that gave the original story most of its distinction. ... Maggie Smith brings the heroine with her consciously theatrical gestures and trite romantic fantasies vividly to life, and both Celia Johnson, registering tight-lipped disapproval as the sensible headmistress, and Pamela Franklin, as the girl who betrays her, more than hold their own. But verbal onslaught and endless exchanges of significant observations prove a poor substitute for the understated and half-understood interactions of a tightly knit group of characters. Though the mixture of good and harm that the eccentric teacher provokes does emerge from all the hyperbole, one is left with the impression of having glimpsed not the prime but the trial of Miss Jean Brodie. And this impression of a series of verbal battles between an articulate defendant and a wily prosecuting counsel is only heightened by Neame's imperceptible direction."

Leslie Halliwell said: "Interesting but slackly handled and maddeningly played character drama."

The Radio Times Guide to Films gave the film 5/5 stars, writing: "Although Vanessa Redgrave was a hit in the West End version of Muriel Spark's novel, few would argue that the part of liberated Edinburgh schoolmarm Jean Brodie now belongs solely to Maggie Smith. Never have such politically incorrect opinions been expressed with such disarming charm or been received with such trusting innocence. While Smith thoroughly deserved her Oscar, it is somewhat surprising that Celia Johnson was overlooked for her superb performance as the disapproving headmistress. Robert Stephens and Gordon Jackson are also on form as the men in Smith's life, and Pamela Franklin impresses as the pupil who turns Judas. Crème de la crème, indeed."

Rotten Tomatoes reports that 81% of 21 critics have given the film a positive review.

Maggie Smith was singled out for her performance in the film. Dave Kehr of Chicago Reader wrote that Smith gives "one of those technically stunning, emotionally distant performances that the British are so damn good at." Greg Ferrara wrote that the film "is one of the best British films of the decade. It is as captivating today as it was upon its release and its two central performances by Maggie Smith and Pamela Franklin are both stirring and mesmerizing. The Prime of Miss Jean Brodie is the crème de la crème."

=== Awards and nominations ===
Award	Category	Recipient	Result	Ref.
Academy Awards	Best Actress	Maggie Smith	Won	
Academy Awards	Best Song – Original for the Picture	"Jean"; Music and Lyrics by Rod McKuen	Nominated	
British Academy Film Awards	Best Actress in a Leading Role	Maggie Smith	Won	
British Academy Film Awards	Best Actress in a Supporting Role	Celia Johnson	Won	
British Academy Film Awards	Best Actress in a Supporting Role	Pamela Franklin	Nominated	
Cannes Film Festival	Palme d'Or	Ronald Neame	Nominated	
Golden Globe Awards	Best Motion Picture – Drama		Nominated	
Golden Globe Awards	Best Actress in a Motion Picture – Drama	Maggie Smith	Nominated	
Golden Globe Awards	Best Original Song – Motion Picture	"Jean"; Music and Lyrics by Rod McKuen	Won	
National Board of Review Awards	Top Ten Films		7th Place	
National Board of Review Awards	Best Supporting Actress	Pamela Franklin	Won	
National Society of Film Critics Awards	Best Actress	Maggie Smith	3rd Place	
National Society of Film Critics Awards	Best Supporting Actress	Celia Johnson	3rd Place	
New York Film Critics Circle Awards	Best Actress	Maggie Smith	Runner-up	
Writers Guild of America Awards	Best Drama – Adapted from Another Medium	Jay Presson Allen	Nominated	

== 1978 television version ==
The Prime of Miss Jean Brodie was adapted by Scottish Television serial for ITV in 1978 with Geraldine McEwan in the lead role. Rather than recapitulate the plot of the novel, it imagined episodes in the lives of the characters, such as conflict between Jean Brodie and the father of an Italian refugee student, who fled Mussolini's Italy because the father was persecuted as a journalist who objected to fascism. It consisted of seven episodes of 50 minutes. It was released on DVD in Region 1 and 2.

=== TV cast ===
- Geraldine McEwan – Jean Brodie
- Robert Urquhart – George Jenkins
- Madeleine Christie – Mrs. MacDonald
- John Castle – Teddy Lloyd
- Michael Elder – Rev. Ian Ball
- Lennox Milne – Mrs. Michie
- Anna Wing – Mrs. Delbert
- Charmian May – Mrs. Camel
- Maxine Gordon – Cynthia
- Lesley Fitz-Simons – Clara
- Ann Mitchell – Miss Michaels
- Tammy Ustinov – Miss Finch
- Georgine Anderson – Miss Gaunt
- Vivienne Ross – Miss Campbell
- George Cormack – Mr. Lawson
- Lynsey Baxter – Sandy Stranger
- Romana Kaye – Giulia Cibelli
- Amanda Kirby – Jenny Gray
- Tracey Childs – Rose Stanley
- Jean McKinley – Mary MacGregor
- Janette Rankin – Schoolgirl
- Evelyn Hill – Schoolgirl
- Suzy Paterson – Schoolgirl
- Penelope Allsopp – Dorothy
- Paula Magee – Schoolgirl
- Candace Alexander – Schoolgirl
- Diane Wilson – Schoolgirl
- Leona Monaghan – Schoolgirl
- M. Anna Monaghan – Schoolgirl
- Alison Lamont – Schoolgirl
- Marion Harvey – Schoolgirl
- Patricia Rouse – Schoolgirl
- Julie Brennan – Juliet
- Anne Marie McFadden – Schoolgirl
- Paul Kermack – Mr. Gray
- Jameson Clark – Dr. McReady
- Noreen D'Inverno – Schoolgirl
- Linda Downey – Schoolgirl
- Tim Barlow – Giovanni Cibelli
- Mary Miller – Irene Cibelli
- Victor Carin – William Stanley
- Joe Brady – Mr. Stuart Allsopp
- Mary Riggans – Mrs. Rona Allsopp
- Brown Derby – Mr. Ritchie
- Dory Hepburn – Maggie
- Jake D'Arcy – Jimmy

== See also ==
- Cinema of the United Kingdom
- Cinema of Scotland
- List of Academy Award winners and nominees from Great Britain
