= Diamond Cartel =

2015 adventure film

- Directed by: Salamat Muhammed-Äli
- Produced by: Gamal Diab; Däuren Musa
- Starring: Armand Assante; Peter O'Toole
- Distributed by: Cleopatra Films
- Release date: 24 March 2015

Diamond Cartel, also known by the title The Whole World at Our Feet, is a 2015 adventure film produced and shot in Kazakhstan, directed by Salamat Muhammed-Äli, and written by Magamet Bachaev, Däuren Musa, and Salamat Muhammed-Äli. It stars Armand Assante, Bolo Yeung, Cary-Hiroyuki Tagawa, Don "the Dragon" Wilson, and Peter O'Toole, in his final film role.

== Cast ==
- Armand Assante as Mussa
- Qarlyğaş Muhamedjanova as Aliya
- Alexey Frandetti as Ruslan
- Nurlan Altaev as Arman
- Cary-Hiroyuki Tagawa as Khazar
- Serik Bimurzin as "Catastrophe"
- Murat Bisenbin as "Cube"
- Peter O'Toole as "Tugboat"
- Michael Madsen as Mike
- Tommy Lister as Louie
- Don 'The Dragon' Wilson as Mr. Lo
- Oliver Gruner as Tony
- Arsen Jambylov as Bakha "Slick"
- Olga Elmanova as Olga
- Asan Mäjit as Sorrel
- Bolo Yeung as Bulo
