= The Stunt Man =

1980 film by Richard Rush

- Theatrical poster
- Directed by: Richard Rush
- Screenplay by: Lawrence B. Marcus; Richard Rush
- Based on: The Stunt Man by Paul Brodeur
- Produced by: Richard Rush
- Starring: Peter O'Toole; Steve Railsback; Barbara Hershey; Allen Goorwitz; Alex Rocco; Adam Roarke; Sharon Farrell; Philip Bruns; Chuck Bail
- Cinematography: Mario Tosi
- Edited by: Caroline Biggerstaff; Jack Hofstra
- Music by: Dominic Frontiere
- Production company: Melvin Simon Productions
- Distributed by: 20th Century Fox
- Release date: June 27, 1980
- Running time: 131 minutes
- Country: United States
- Language: English
- Budget: $6 million
- Box office: $7.1 million

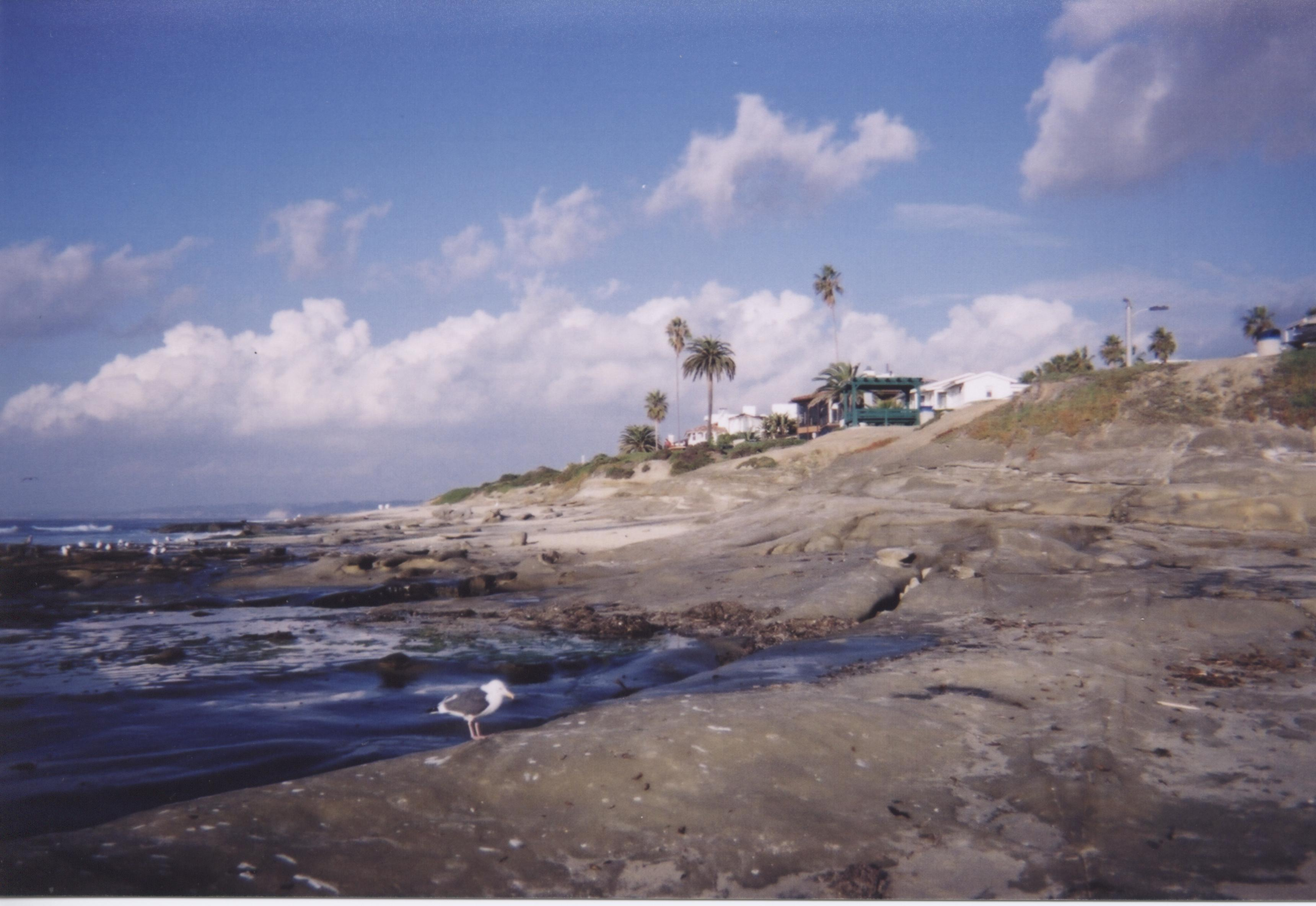
La Jolla beachfront, one of the filming locations for the film in particular where Cameron meets Nina.

The Stunt Man is a 1980 American satirical psychological black comedy film starring Peter O'Toole, Steve Railsback and Barbara Hershey, and directed by Richard Rush. The film was adapted by Lawrence B. Marcus and Rush from the 1970 novel by Paul Brodeur. It tells the story of a young fugitive who hides as a stunt double on the set of a World War I movie whose charismatic director will do seemingly anything for the sake of his art. The line between illusion and reality is blurred as scenes from the inner movie cut seamlessly to "real life" and vice versa. There are examples of "movie magic", where a scene of wartime carnage is revealed as just stunt men and props, and where a shot of a crying woman becomes, with scenery, props and soundtrack, a portrait of a grieving widow at a Nazi rally. The protagonist begins to doubt everything he sees and hears, and at the end is faced with real danger when a stunt seems to go wrong.

It was nominated for three Academy Awards: Best Actor in a Leading Role (Peter O'Toole), Best Director (Richard Rush), and Best Writing, Screenplay Based on Material from Another Medium. However, due to its limited release, it never earned much attention from audiences at large. As O'Toole remarked in a DVD audio commentary, "The film wasn't released. It escaped." The film has since developed a cult following.

== Plot ==
Cameron, a Vietnam veteran wanted for attempted murder, escapes police custody. Crossing a bridge, he dodges a car that seems to be trying to run him down; when he turns around, the car has disappeared. A helicopter flies close to the bridge and a man inside looks at Cameron. Cameron comes across a movie crewing filming a World War I battle scene. He notices an older woman walking through the set who falls in the water. Cameron dives in to rescue her and is horrified when she pulls off her face—a mask. She is the movie's leading actress, Nina Franklin, testing make-up for scenes set late in her character's life.

The director, Eli Cross, the man in the helicopter, descends from the sky on his camera crane. He offers Cameron a job, explaining that their stunt man Burt ran a car off a bridge. They haven't found the body, and can't afford the production delays if police get involved. The police chief is aware of the accident but Eli convinces him that Cameron is the stuntman. Cameron accepts the job. Eli shows the police film footage that seems to show Cameron was never on the bridge.

Denise, the film's hair stylist, dyes Cameron's hair in order to make him resemble the leading man, Raymond Bailey. Cameron is convinced Eli will turn him over to the police but Eli reassures him that will not. Cameron is trained by Chuck the stunt coordinator, and films a scene where he is chased across the roof of a large building and falls through a skylight into a bordello. Cameron gets involved with Nina, who once had a romance with Eli, who becomes jealous of Cameron.

The last shoot at the current location involves Cameron's most difficult stunt, driving off a bridge and escaping under water (the same scene Burt was shooting when he died). Cameron believes Eli is trying to kill him, and will use the stunt to make it look like an accident.

The morning before the shoot Cameron tells Nina why he was arrested. He planned to open an ice cream shop with a friend when he got home from Vietnam. His friend confesses he had started a relationship with Cameron's girlfriend while Cameron was in Vietnam. Enraged, Cameron destroyed the ice cream shop. When a cop showed up, Cameron knocked him out, leaving his head freezing in a bucket of ice cream, resulting in an attempted murder charge. Nina and Cameron plan to escape together: Nina will hide in the trunk of the car, which Cameron will drive away in the morning instead of driving off the bridge.

The next morning, a nervous Cameron starts the scene too early. When Chuck triggers the exploding tire, Cameron loses control and drives the car into the river. Cameron scrambles to reach Nina in the trunk, but sees Nina with Eli on the bridge. Despite the air bottle Cameron is supposed to use being empty, he manages to get out of the car. Cameron emerges and sees there were divers in the water with him all the time. Nina tells him that she was found in the trunk hours before the shoot, and Eli told her Cameron had decided to do the stunt. Eli explains that he would not let Cameron run off thinking he was trying to kill him, and felt the best way to convince Cameron of his good will was to make sure Cameron got through the stunt in one piece. Cameron, though furious, is relieved to be alive. Cameron and Eli bicker over Cameron's pay and plan to catch a plane to the production's next location.

== Cast ==
- Peter O'Toole as Eli Cross, an eccentric auteur director
- Steve Railsback as Cameron, a Vietnam War veteran on the lam
- Barbara Hershey as Nina Franklin, an impassioned melodramatic actress
- Allen Goorwitz as Sam, a screenwriter
- Alex Rocco as Jake
- Sharon Farrell as Denise
- Adam Roarke as Raymond Bailey
- Philip Bruns as Ace
- Charles Bail as Chuck Barton, stunt coordinator
- John Garwood as Gabe

== Production ==
Shortly after Paul Brodeur published the original novel, his Harvard University classmate Frederick Wiseman initially agreed to direct an adaptation but quickly departed the project. Columbia Pictures held on to the film rights to the novel, and considered either Arthur Penn or François Truffaut to direct it. They both expressed interest but declined in favor of other projects, although they did incorporate elements of the film into their projects Day for Night (1973) and Night Moves (1975).

Columbia Pictures finally offered the film to Richard Rush on the strength of the success of his previous film, Getting Straight. Rush initially rejected, then ultimately accepted directing The Stunt Man. In July 1971, Columbia announced that Rush would direct the film with William Castle as executive producer. Rush then penned a 150-page treatment different from the book; in the novel, the characters were all crazy, and in the screenplay, they were instead "sane in a world gone mad." Columbia executives then rejected the script, saying it was difficult to find a genre to place it in. Said Rush: "They couldn't figure out if it was a comedy, a drama, if it was a social satire, if it was an action adventure...and, of course, the answer was, 'Yes, it's all those things.' But that isn't a satisfactory answer to a studio executive." Rush then bought the film rights from Columbia. He and Lawrence B. Marcus completed a screenplay nine months later, but could not convince any other studios to fund the film. He shopped the film to other studios, to no avail.

Rush spent the next several years unsuccessfully pitching both The Stunt Man and One Flew Over the Cuckoo's Nest (1975), which he had optioned from Michael Douglas, to different studios. Rush was finally offered several deals to finance The Stunt Man in 1976, but they collapsed after Warner Bros. Pictures began developing a similarly titled film called The Stuntman. Rush challenged Warner Bros. to Motion Picture Association of America arbitration which also delayed The Stuntman for several years and forced Warner Bros. to change its title to Hooper (1978). Trans World Entertainment agreed to finance the film and principal photography was planned to begin in San Diego on October 17, 1977. The production was cancelled at the last minute after Rush and Ely Landau could not agree on casting. Funding for the picture finally came in 1978 from Melvin Simon, who had made a fortune in real estate.

Production began in the summer of 1978. Many scenes were filmed in and around the historic Hotel del Coronado in Coronado, California, including the Children's Pool Beach.

The genre-defying film was essentially completed by August 1979 but could not immediately find a distributor and was handicapped by indifferent test screenings and Simon's lack of interest in the final product. But Seattle Post-Intelligencer film critic William Arnold saw it that same month in a private screening at Rush's house and was so taken with it, and sure it would work for an audience set up in advance for its unconventionality, that he lobbied other critics like Pauline Kael and Gene Siskel on its behalf and lavishly praised it in a feature story designed to pull an overflow audience to a test screening at Seattle's Overlake Theater on August 25.

That screening was so successful it led to a forty-three week run at Seattle's Guild 45th Theater, followed by similarly successful one-theater runs in Dallas and Westwood, Los Angeles. There were further delays due to continual conflict between Rush and Simon, and a heart attack Rush suffered in the autumn of 1979, but after the film won the Grand Prize at the 1980 Montreal World Film Festival, it was picked up for distribution by 20th Century Fox on November 3, 1980.

Peter O'Toole mentions in his DVD commentary that he based his character on David Lean who directed him in Lawrence of Arabia.

== Reception ==
Reviewing it upon its release, Roger Ebert wrote "there was a great deal in it that I admired... [but] there were times when I felt cheated". He gave the film two stars but noted that others had "highly recommended" it. In an October 17, 1980, review in The New York Times, Janet Maslin noted "the film's cleverness is aggressive and cool," but concluded that although "the gamesmanship of The Stunt Man is fast and furious... gamesmanship is almost all it manages to be". Jay Scott called it "[t]he best movie about making a movie ever made, but the achievement merely begins there. ... Imagine a picture an eight-year-old and Wittgenstein could enjoy with equal fervor." Pauline Kael considered it "a virtuoso piece of kinetic moviemaking" and rated it one of year's best films; she called O'Toole's comic performance "peerless".

As of November 2023, the comedy drama film held a 91% "Fresh" rating on Rotten Tomatoes based on 43 reviews. The critics consensus states, "The Stunt Man is a preposterously entertaining thriller with a clever narrative and Oscar-worthy (nomination, at least!) Peter O'Toole performance."

In 2025, The Hollywood Reporter listed The Stunt Man as having the best stunts of 1980.

== Awards ==
- Montreal World Film Festival – Grand Prix des Amériques (Best Film) for Richard Rush
- Golden Globe Awards – Best Original Score for Dominic Frontiere
- National Society of Film Critics Awards – Best Actor for Peter O'Toole

=== Nominations ===
The Stunt Man received three Oscar nominations:

- Best Director – Richard Rush
- Best Actor – Peter O'Toole
- Best Adapted Screenplay – Lawrence B. Marcus, Richard Rush

The Stunt Man also received five Golden Globe nominations:

- Best Motion Picture
- Best Director – Richard Rush
- Best Screenplay – Lawrence B. Marcus, Richard Rush
- Best Actor in a Motion Picture – Drama – Peter O'Toole
- New Star of the Year – Actor – Steve Railsback

== Home media ==
The Stunt Man was released on DVD on November 20, 2001, in two versions by Anchor Bay Entertainment. The first version is a standard release featuring two deleted scenes and a commentary by director Richard Rush. The second version is a limited edition (100,000 copies) containing everything from the standard release as well as the 2000 documentary The Sinister Saga of Making "The Stunt Man".

The film's theme song "Bits & Pieces" is sung by Dusty Springfield.

== See also ==
- List of films featuring fictional films
