= Goodbye, Mr. Chips (1969 film) =

1969 film by Herbert Ross

- Theatrical release poster
- Directed by: Herbert Ross
- Written by: Terence Rattigan
- Based on: Goodbye, Mr. Chips; 1934 novella by James Hilton
- Produced by: Arthur P. Jacobs
- Starring: Peter O'Toole; Petula Clark; Michael Redgrave
- Cinematography: Oswald Morris
- Edited by: Ralph Kemplen
- Music by: Leslie Bricusse (songs); John Williams (underscore)
- Production company: APJAC Productions
- Distributed by: Metro-Goldwyn-Mayer (US); David Ortan (UK)
- Release dates: November 5, 1969 (New York); November 25, 1969 (London)
- Running time: 152 minutes (initial release); 148 minutes (video release); 155 minutes (director's cut)
- Countries: United Kingdom; United States
- Language: English
- Budget: £2,500,000

Goodbye, Mr. Chips is a 1969 British-American musical film directed by Herbert Ross. The screenplay by Terence Rattigan is based on James Hilton's 1934 novella Goodbye, Mr. Chips, which was first adapted for the screen in 1939.

== Plot ==
In 1924, Arthur Chipping, or "Chips", is an established member of the teaching staff at Brookfield School, a public school just outside of London. A stodgy teacher of Latin and Greek, he is disliked by his pupils, who find him boring and call him "Ditchy", short for "dull as ditchwater". In the dining room of the Savoy Hotel, on the eve of his summer holiday, Chips meets Katherine Bridges, a music hall soubrette. Dissatisfied with her career and social circle, and depressed by her romantic entanglements, Katherine sets sail on a Mediterranean cruise and by chance is reunited with Chips in Paestum, where the pair spend a nice day together. Seeing in "Mr Chips" a lonely soul similar to herself, Katherine arranges an evening at the theatre after they return to Britain, and they soon fall in love. When Chips arrives at Brookfield for the autumn term, it is with his new wife on his arm, much to the shock of the staff and delight of the pupils, who find Mrs Chips' charm to be irresistible. The marriage softens Chips, and his students begin to like him more.

When the wealthy Lord Sutterwick learns who Chips has married, he announces his intention to deprive Brookfield of a planned financial endowment because of Katherine's background, but Katherine threatens to reveal Sutterwick's past dalliance with her friend Ursula Mossbank, and Sutterwick relents. However, when the headmaster of Brookfield retires in 1939, Sutterwick uses his influence to fill the open position with a teacher at Brookfield who is less senior than Chips. The new headmaster serves until 1944, at which point Chips is given his long-awaited promotion. Before he can give Katherine the news, she is killed by a German V-1 flying bomb while entertaining the troops at a local Royal Air Force base. Chips retires after the war is over, but he stays involved at Brookfield, and is comforted by visits from his former pupils and his memories of Katherine.

== Cast ==
- Peter O'Toole as Arthur "Chips" Chipping, the Greek and Latin instructor at Brookfield School
- Petula Clark as Katherine Bridges (real last name Brisket), a self-described soubrette
- Michael Redgrave as the headmaster at Brookfield
- George Baker as Lord Sutterwick, a rich benefactor of Brookfield
- Siân Phillips as Ursula Mossbank, Katherine's friend
- Michael Bryant as Max Staefel, the German instructor at Brookfield
- Jack Hedley as William Baxter, the biology instructor at Brookfield
- Alison Leggatt as the headmaster's wife
- Clinton Greyn as Bill Calbury, Katherine's on-again, off-again boyfriend
- Michael Culver as Johnny Longbridge, Chips' friend and former student
- Elspeth March as Mrs Summersthwaite, a guest at the headmaster's dinner party
- Ronnie Stevens as Algie, an actor friend of Katherine and Ursula
- John Gugolka as Lord Sutterwick's son and great-grandson
- Michael Ridgeway as David, a student at Brookfield who has a crush on Katherine
- Tom Owen as Farley, a student at Brookfield during WWII
- Jack May as Fenwick, an instructor at Brookfield (uncredited)
- Craig Marriott as the lost new student at the train station (uncredited)
- Sheila Steafel as Tilly, a guest at Katherine's party (uncredited)
- Nicholas Frankau as the tardy student (uncredited)
- Patricia Hayes as Miss Honeybun, Katherine's accompanist for the RAF concert (uncredited)
- Richard Vernon as the chairman of the Brookfield board of governors (uncredited)
- Gillian Blake as a girl at the party (uncredited)
- Cornelia Frances as a girl at the party (uncredited)

== Production ==
=== Development ===
A draft of a musical adaptation of Goodbye, Mr. Chips was on file in the Metro-Goldwyn-Mayer script department as early as 1951. In 1964, trade magazine advertisements announced that Julie Andrews, fresh from her success in Mary Poppins, was to star in a Mr. Chips musical opposite Rex Harrison, with Vincente Minnelli as director, but nothing came of the project. When work resumed a few years later, there were numerous pre-production problems, among them several changes in the casting of the lead roles. Richard Burton and Samantha Eggar were signed, and then Lee Remick replaced Eggar. When Gower Champion, who had replaced Minnelli as director, viewed raw footage of Petula Clark in Finian's Rainbow (1968), he fired Remick and replaced her with Clark. Remick sued MGM for damages, and Burton balked at playing opposite a "pop singer", so he was replaced by Peter O'Toole. Siân Phillips, O'Toole's wife, was cast as Ursula Mossbank, a character said to have been inspired by actress Tallulah Bankhead. Champion eventually left the project, and the film ultimately became the first-time directorial effort of choreographer Herbert Ross.

The film's songs were written by Leslie Bricusse, who replaced André and Dory Previn. Nora Kaye, wife of Herbert Ross, choreographed Clark's two musical production numbers. Ken Adam served as the film's art director, and Julie Harris designed the costumes.

=== Filming ===
Much of the film was made on location. In Italy, scenes were shot in Campania, Capaccio, Naples, Paestum, Pompeii, and Positano. In London, 59 Strand-on-the-Green in Chiswick served as Katherine's home, and the Salisbury, a popular bar in the West End theatre district, was the setting for a scene in which Chips and Katherine share a drink after watching a performance of Medea. Sherborne School in Dorset stood in for the fictional Brookfield School, and scenes were also filmed in the town of Sherborne. Two 4-LAV electric multiple-unit train engines (numbers 2925 and 2943) that had been withdrawn from the Brighton Main Line were hauled down to Sherborne Station in October 1968 for filming, before being scrapped on 22 October.

=== Differences from novella and 1939 film ===
Terence Rattigan's screenplay diverged significantly from Hilton's novella and the 1939 film adaptation. Firstly, the time frame of the story was advanced by several decades, starting in the 1920s, continuing through the Second World War, and ending in the late 1960s. Also, the musical does not show Chipping's first arrival at Brookfield School but starts with him already an established member of the teaching staff. Additionally, Rattigan made the character of Katherine Bridges a music hall soubrette and has her get killed by a V-1 flying bomb after being married to Chips for two decades, rather than dying in childbirth after a much shorter marriage. This film omits the deathbed scene. After Chips is visited by the pupil who says "Goodbye, Mr Chips" to him, he leaves his cottage and walks away from the camera, with a final shot showing life at the school continuing. Finally, the character's name changes slightly, from Charles Edward Chipping to Arthur Chipping.

Terry Kilburn, who had portrayed the four generations of the Colley family in the original 1939 film, was approached to appear in a different role in the 1969 remake. However, due to a scheduling conflict, Kilburn was unable to appear in the film.

== Music ==
Music and lyrics by Leslie Bricusse, orchestra conducted by John Williams:

- "Overture" – Orchestra
- "Main Titles/Fill the World With Love" (Brookfield School's anthem) – Orchestra and Boys Chorus
- "Where Did My Childhood Go?" – Peter O'Toole
- "London Is London" – Petula Clark
- "And the Sky Smiled" – Petula Clark
- "Apollo" – Petula Clark
- "When I Am Older" – Boys Chorus
- "Walk Through the World" – Petula Clark
- "Fill the World With Love" – Petula Clark and Boys Chorus
- "Entr'Acte/What Shall I Do With Today?" – Orchestra/Petula Clark
- "What a Lot of Flowers" – Peter O'Toole
- "What a Lot of Flowers (Reprise)" – Peter O'Toole
- "And the Sky Smiled (Reprise)" – Petula Clark
- "Schooldays" – Petula Clark and Boys
- "You and I" – Petula Clark
- "Fill the World With Love (Reprise)" – Peter O'Toole and Boys Chorus
- "Exit Music/You and I" – Orchestra
- "When I Was Younger" – Peter O'Toole (deleted from the film, but included on the original soundtrack recording)

"You and I" remains a staple of Petula Clark's concert repertoire.

A limited-edition 3-CD set of the complete score, including alternative versions of songs and discarded numbers, was released by the Film Score Monthly Silver Age Classics label in 2006.

== Release ==
The film had its premiere at the Palace Theatre in New York City on 5 November 1969.

After the film's initial roadshow bookings, and before it was released in neighborhood theaters, many of the musical numbers were deleted, even though many of them were instrumental in explaining the characters' inner thoughts and emotions. The shortened version of the film was used for its initial television network broadcasts, but the complete version has been shown on TCM. Intervening years have brought a new appreciation for Bricusse's sentimental songs, as well as John Williams' underscore and orchestrations.

The film had a Royal European premiere on 24 November 1969 at the Empire, Leicester Square in London, attended by Queen Elizabeth II, before normal performances at the theatre from 25 November.

=== Home media ===
The film was released in anamorphic widescreen format on Region 1 DVD by Warner Home Video on January 29, 2009. This release has audio tracks in English and Japanese, and subtitles in English, French, Japanese, and Thai. The only bonus features are the trailers for this film and the 1939 adaptation of Hilton's novel.

== Reception ==
=== Critical response ===
Reviews for the film were lukewarm, although both O'Toole and Clark were universally praised for their performances and the obvious chemistry between them. According to Seventeen: "Rarely have a pair of players been so marvelously in tune with each other as Peter O'Toole and Petula Clark."

In his review in The New York Times, Vincent Canby said: "[Peter O'Toole] has never been better. Having been forced to abandon his usual mechanical flamboyance, he gives Chips an air of genuine, if seedy, grandeur that shines through dozens of make-up changes… Miss Clark is a fine rock singer with the quality of a somewhat tough Julie Andrews (which I like and is not to be confused with Miss Andrews's steely cool)… The film is the first directorial effort of Herbert Ross…the sort of director who depends heavily on the use of the zoom, the boom and the helicopter, which gives the movie the contradictory look of a mod-Victorian valentine…[he] has handled the musical sequences…more or less as soliloquies. O'Toole talks his with such charm that I almost suspected he was lip-syncing Rex Harrison's voice, and Miss Clark belts hers in good, modified Streisand style."

Roger Ebert of the Chicago Sun-Times observed: "Goodbye, Mr. Chips uses its budget quietly, with good taste, and succeeds in being a big movie without being a gross one. I think I enjoyed it about as much as any road show since Funny Girl. And that surprised me, since so much of the critical reaction has been negative. Even at its worst, Chips is inoffensive in its sentimentality. At its best, it's the first film since The Two of Us that I genuinely feel deserves to be called heartwarming…the Hilton story was a best seller but hardly a work of art. By modernizing the action, Rattigan has made it possible for the movie to mirror changes in the English class structure during the two decades when it was most obviously becoming obsolete… As the schoolmaster and his wife, Peter O'Toole and Petula Clark are exactly right. O'Toole succeeds in creating a character that is aloof, chillingly correct, terribly reserved—and charming all the same…Miss Clark carries most of the musical duties in the film, and carries them well…one of the best things about Chips is that Ross has concentrated on telling his story and hasn't let the songs intrude."

In Holiday magazine, Rex Reed enthused: "I think I'm in love with Petula Clark. If she had come along twenty years ago, a time the screen knew a mercurial presence when it saw one, she would have been a much bigger star than she ever has a chance of being now. The playing is superb. Peter O'Toole is a prim and angular Chips who wears a look of permanent insecurity; Miss Clark is a soft, sweet-smelling, dimpled doughnut with powdery cheeks and witty anxiety, like a new Jean Arthur. Together they are perfect counterparts… Goodbye, Mr. Chips is, I'm afraid, very square indeed, but thanks to an idyllic cast and a magnificent director, there is so much love and beauty in it that it made my heart stop with joy. I found it all quite irresistible."

Archer Winsten of the New York Post stated: "[It] has been produced in England in surroundings of inevitable authenticity and taste, with performers of extraordinary talent and range, and the results are here for all of us to share the sentimental warmth…that O'Toole performance is a gem, and Petula Clark knows exactly how to enhance its brilliance, and her own, most effectively."

In Life, Richard Schickel wrote: "Petula Clark…is fresh and charming. Together with O’Toole she provides the firm, bright core for a film always in danger of becoming mushy. Nearly unaided, they make the old thing work—and make it worthwhile."

A reviewer for the British Channel 4 felt that "the main problem with turning the film into a musical is that the songs lack the emotion that the story really needs… That said, O'Toole is superb as Chips and Clark charming as the woman who dramatically changes his life."

On review aggregator website Rotten Tomatoes, the film has an approval rating of 100% based on review from 6 critics, with an average score of 7.0/10.

=== Accolades ===
Award	Category	Nominee(s)	Result
Academy Awards	Best Actor	Peter O'Toole	Nominated
Academy Awards	Best Score of a Musical Picture – Original or Adaptation	Music and Lyrics by Leslie Bricusse; Score Adaptation by John Williams	Nominated
David di Donatello Awards	Best Foreign Actor	Peter O'Toole	Won (Note: Tied with Dustin Hoffman for Midnight Cowboy.)
Giffoni Film Festival	Golden Gryphon	Herbert Ross	Won
Golden Globe Awards	Best Actor in a Motion Picture – Musical or Comedy	Peter O'Toole	Won
Golden Globe Awards	Best Supporting Actress – Motion Picture	Siân Phillips	Nominated
Golden Globe Awards	Best Original Score – Motion Picture	Leslie Bricusse	Nominated
National Board of Review Awards	Top Ten Films	Goodbye, Mr. Chips	4th Place
National Board of Review Awards	Best Actor	Peter O'Toole	Won
National Society of Film Critics Awards	Best Actor	Peter O'Toole	2nd Place
National Society of Film Critics Awards	Best Supporting Actress	Siân Phillips	Won (Note: Tied with Delphine Seyrig for Stolen Kisses.)

- Of note, Peter O'Toole and Siân Phillips, who had been married for a decade when Goodbye, Mr. Chips was released, were both nominated for multiple awards for their performances in the film.

== Comic book adaption ==
- Gold Key: Goodbye, Mr. Chips (June 1970)

== See also ==
- List of British films of 1969
- Goodbye, Mr. Chips (1939 film)
