= Hitler: The Rise of Evil =

2003 Canadian television miniseries

- Written by: John Pielmeier; G. Ross Parker
- Directed by: Christian Duguay
- Starring: Robert Carlyle; Stockard Channing; Jena Malone; Julianna Margulies; Matthew Modine; Thomas Sangster; Liev Schreiber; Peter Stormare; Peter O'Toole
- Music by: Normand Corbeil
- Country of origin: Canada
- Original language: English
- No. of episodes: 2

Production
- Executive producers: Ed Gernon; Peter Alan Sussman; Christian Duguay; Diana Kerew
- Producers: John Ryan; Ed Gernon; Peter Sussman
- Production locations: Prague, Czechia; Brno, Czechia; Vienna, Austria
- Editors: Sylvain Lebel; James R. Myers; Henk Van Eeghen
- Running time: 179 minutes
- Production company: Alliance Atlantis

Original release
- Network: CBC
- Release: 18 May 2003

Hitler: The Rise of Evil is a 2003 Canadian historical drama television miniseries directed by Christian Duguay for CBC Television. It stars Robert Carlyle in the lead role and explores Adolf Hitler's rise and his early consolidation of power during the years after the First World War and focuses on how the embittered, politically fragmented and economically buffeted state of German society following the war made that ascent possible. The film also focuses on Ernst Hanfstaengl's influence on Hitler's rise to power. A subplot follows the struggles of Fritz Gerlich, a German journalist who opposes the rising Nazi Party.

The quotation disputably attributed to Edmund Burke is displayed at the beginning and end of the film, "The only thing necessary for the triumph of evil is for good men to do nothing."

The miniseries, which premiered simultaneously in May 2003 on CBC in Canada and CBS in the United States, received two Emmy Awards, for Art Direction and Sound Editing, while Peter O'Toole was nominated for Best Supporting Actor.

== Plot ==
The opening is a montage of Adolf Hitler's life from 1899 to 1913, when he left Austria for Munich. His participation in the First World War on the German side is then shown in a series of episodes that includes his promotion to the rank of corporal, his awarding of the Iron Cross for bravery and his blinding during a gas attack and his subsequent medical treatment, during which he learns Germany has surrendered.

Hitler returns to a revolutionary Munich in 1919 and, still employed by the army, is assigned to report on the newly formed political parties in the city. After attending a meeting of the German Workers' Party, he is recruited by the party's leader, Anton Drexler, to organize its propaganda activities and give increasingly popular speeches, harping on the themes that Germany has been betrayed by the leaders who surrendered in the last war and that Communists and Jews are sapping the German spirit from within. After meeting the wealthy art publisher Ernst Hanfstaengl, Hitler is encouraged to refine his image and create a symbol for the party, which he does by adopting the swastika. Hanfstaengl also puts Hitler in contact with the city's influential figures, including the war hero Hermann Göring, and the militant Ernst Röhm, eventual organizer of the paramilitary SA, whom Hitler had met previously but whose services and men he was then unable to afford. In 1921, Hitler forces Drexler to resign and takes over as leader of the renamed Nazi Party.

In 1923, the Minister of Bavaria, Gustav von Kahr, urged on by his speechwriter, the journalist Fritz Gerlich, tries to outfox Hitler by convincing him that he is preparing to stage a military coup against the national government in Berlin and that Hitler must remain silent, or his party can play no part in it. Upon learning that the proposed putsch is merely a ruse, Hitler confronts Kahr at gunpoint and coerces him and his associates into supporting his own plan for a putsch. Röhm and the SA plan to take over the military barracks in preparation for a march on Berlin, but the attempted coup is quickly crushed. Hitler takes refuge at the Hanfstaengl home, almost resorting to suicide before Helene Hanfstaengl takes the gun from his hand.

Arrested by the authorities and tried for treason, Hitler manages to use the trial to his advantage, winning over the courtroom spectators and the judge with his theatrics, with only Gerlich and the prosecutors unmoved by his speeches. Consequently he is awarded a lenient sentence in Landsberg Prison, where he writes his memoirs (later published as Mein Kampf). In 1925, Hitler goes to the countryside to escape from politics and is joined by his older half-sister, Angela, and her daughter, Geli Raubal. When he returns to Munich, Hitler takes Geli with him.

Eschewing revolution, Hitler now demands that the party follow a democratic course to power. That declaration puts him into conflict with Röhm, but Hitler's demand for complete subordination of the party to himself as Führer wins the approval of most others, including an impressionable young agitator named Joseph Goebbels. During the late 1920s, the party's political fortunes improve due to Hitler's speeches and the stock market crash ruining the economy, with the National Socialists gaining more and more seats in the Reichstag with each election. Alarmed by the party's growing popularity, Gerlich continues to write articles in opposition to Hitler and, when the paper's editor fires him, forms his own newspaper called The Straight Path.

Meanwhile, Hitler forms a relationship with Geli but eventually, distraught by his overbearing control on her life, she commits suicide, after which Hitler forms a relationship with Eva Braun.

In 1932, Hitler becomes a German citizen and runs for president against the incumbent, Paul von Hindenburg. Although he is unsuccessful, the party becomes the largest in the Reichstag shortly after, which emboldens Hitler to demand that he be made Chancellor of Germany. Though Hindenburg despises Hitler, the former Chancellor Franz von Papen helps bring that about in January 1933. Later, the Reichstag building is set on fire, allegedly by a communist, and Hitler uses the incident to have members of the Reichstag award him dictatorial powers, which include suspension of civil liberties such as freedom of the press. As a consequence, Gerlich's newspaper is shut down and he is arrested by the SA and sent to a concentration camp.

Germany now becomes a police state, and Hitler crushes all his opponents, both inside and outside the party, which sees Röhm being arrested and the SA greatly reduced. Röhm is later sentenced to death along with others like von Kahr and Gerlich, and the rest of the SA is absorbed into the Reichswehr army. After Hindenburg's death in August 1934, Hitler combines the office of president and chancellor into one, finally making him the ultimate ruler of Germany.

== Cast ==
- Robert Carlyle as Adolf Hitler
  - Thomas Sangster as Hitler (age 10)
  - Simon Sullivan as Hitler (age 17)
- Stockard Channing as Klara Hitler
- Jena Malone as Geli Raubal
- Julianna Margulies as Helene Hanfstaengl
- Matthew Modine as Fritz Gerlich
- Liev Schreiber as Ernst Hanfstaengl
- Peter Stormare as Ernst Röhm
- Friedrich von Thun as Erich Ludendorff
- Peter O'Toole as Paul von Hindenburg
- Zoe Telford as Eva Braun
- Terence Harvey as Gustav Ritter von Kahr
- Justin Salinger as Joseph Goebbels
- Chris Larkin as Hermann Göring
- James Babson as Rudolf Hess
- Patricia Netzer as Sophie Gerlich
- Harvey Friedman as Friedrich Hollaender
- Nicole Marischka as Blandine Ebinger
- Julie-Ann Hassett as Angela Hitler
- Robert Glenister as Anton Drexler
- Brendan Hughes as Hugo Gutmann
- Ian Hogg as Alois Hitler

== Production ==
Originally, Hitler biographer Ian Kershaw had been on board as a consultant. Alliance Atlantis, which had purchased the rights to adapt Kershaw's biography, had wanted to make it more dramatic, but Kershaw found the production's liberties so historically inaccurate regarding Hitler's life that he ultimately chose to have his name removed from the project.

Executive producer Ed Gernon was fired for comparing the climate of fear that led to the rise of Hitler's Nazism to U.S. President George W. Bush's war on terrorism. CBS was prompted to act by a New York Post article that claimed Gernon's comment as an indicator of anti-Americanism in Hollywood.

== Reception ==
The miniseries received mixed reviews but was nominated for seven Emmy Awards and won two. It received a nomination as "Outstanding Miniseries" and Peter O'Toole was nominated for an Emmy in the supporting actor in a TV movie or miniseries category. The miniseries won a Primetime Emmy Award for Art Direction and John Douglas Smith won the Emmy Award for "Outstanding Sound Editing for a Miniseries, Movie or a Special" as Supervising Sound Editor.

The New York Times said: "The filmmakers worked so hard to be tasteful and responsible that they robbed their film of suspense, drama and passion", but commented positively on the performances of Peter O'Toole, Julianna Margulies, and Liev Schreiber.

David Wiegand of the San Francisco Chronicle gave it a positive review, praising Carlyle's performance as "brilliant".

The German magazine Der Spiegel called the film a "soap opera" and "flat melodrama with invented key scenes - Hitler for dummies."

== See also ==
- Adolf Hitler in popular culture
- Nazi concentration camps
