= Global Heresy =

2002 comedy-drama film directed by Sidney J. Furie

- DVD cover
- Directed by: Sidney J. Furie
- Written by: Mark Mills
- Produced by: Harel Goldstein; Gary Howsam; Mark Shorrock; Gary Tuck
- Starring: Peter O'Toole; Alicia Silverstone; Joan Plowright
- Cinematography: Curtis Petersen
- Edited by: David Ostry
- Music by: Jonathan Goldsmith
- Production companies: GFT Entertainment; Ultimate Pictures
- Distributed by: Screen Media Films (United States); Alliance Atlantis (Canada)
- Release dates: June 28, 2002 (Canada); September 3, 2002 (United States)
- Running time: 106 minutes
- Countries: United States; Canada; United Kingdom
- Language: English
- Budget: $12 million

Global Heresy (alternately titled Rock My World in the United States and Canada) is a 2002 comedy-drama film directed by Sidney J. Furie, and starring Peter O'Toole, Joan Plowright, Alicia Silverstone and Martin Clunes. The film centers on a highly successful American rock band recovering from the loss of their leader by going into seclusion in the United Kingdom.

== Plot ==
When a rock band at the top of their game suddenly loses their band leader/bass player, their musical direction becomes questionable. All the band members know is that the leader's clothes were found at the edge of a waterfront and he has not been seen since. To replace their missing leader, they hire a new bassist, Natalie, who shakes up their thoughts of the band. However, the biggest changes come when the band decides to go into seclusion to develop new songs and a new sound. They rent a mansion from an aristocratic couple, Lord and Lady Foxley, who are in need of money. When the staff hired to be on hand when the band arrives do not show, the couple decides to act as the butler, Benson, and the cook, Margaret. The obvious conflicts between the two cultures occur, but a respect for each other gradually follows. Meanwhile, the band's recording company is trying to trick them into signing a contract that obliges them to make the music as the company requires, denying their "creative control". Towards the end of the film, the status quo becomes further shaken when the original band leader shows up and admits that his disappearance had been a planned publicity stunt.

== Cast ==
- Peter O'Toole as Lord Charles Foxley
- Joan Plowright as Lady Diana Foxley
- Alicia Silverstone as Natalie Bevin
- Jaimz Woolvett as Leo
- Keram Malicki-Sánchez as Flit
- Christopher Bolton as Carl
- Lochlyn Munro as Dave
- Martin Clunes as James Chancellor
- Amy Phillips as Georgia
- Alex Karzis as Ben Gould
- Helen Beavis as Margaret
- Ian Downie as Benson
- Carlo Rota as Tony Manson
- Greg Campbell as Man #1 / #2
- Paul Constable as Helper #1
- Daniel Fathers as Journalist #1
- Simon Greenslade as Suit #1
- Declan O'Reilly as English Suit #2
- Olivia Palenstein as Journalist #3
- Richard Partington as Man At Beer Table
- Glyn Thomas as Journalist #2

== Production ==
The film was shot in Toronto.

== Reception ==
Liam Lacey of The Globe and Mail awarded the film two and a half stars out of four.
