= Venus (2006 film) =

2006 film directed by Roger Michell

- American theatrical release poster
- Directed by: Roger Michell
- Written by: Hanif Kureishi
- Produced by: Kevin Loader
- Starring: Peter O'Toole; Leslie Phillips; Jodie Whittaker; Richard Griffiths; Vanessa Redgrave
- Cinematography: Haris Zambarloukos
- Edited by: Nicolas Gaster
- Music by: Corinne Bailey Rae; David Arnold
- Production companies: Miramax Films; FilmFour; UK Film Council; Free Range Films
- Distributed by: Buena Vista International
- Release dates: 2 September 2006 (Telluride); 21 December 2006 (United States); 26 January 2007 (United Kingdom)
- Running time: 95 minutes
- Country: United Kingdom
- Language: English
- Budget: £3 million
- Box office: $7.3 million

Venus is a 2006 British comedy-drama film directed by Roger Michell and produced by Kevin Loader, from a screenplay by Hanif Kureishi. The film stars Peter O'Toole, Leslie Phillips, Jodie Whittaker, Richard Griffiths and Vanessa Redgrave.

Venus had its world premiere at the Telluride Film Festival on 2 September 2006, followed by a limited theatrical release in the United States on 21 December 2006 and a wide release in the United Kingdom on 26 January 2007. O'Toole's performance in the film was met with critical acclaim, earning him his eighth and final Academy Award nomination for Best Actor.

== Plot ==
Maurice Russell is an elderly actor who finds himself increasingly attracted to his friend Ian's grand-niece Jessie, while simultaneously finding himself in deteriorating health owing to prostate cancer. Maurice's friend describes the grand-niece as a troublemaker and a nuisance, but Maurice discovers that Jessie warms to him when he starts interacting with her. He takes her to the National Gallery in London to view his favourite painting, the Rokeby Venus, by the Spanish artist Diego Velázquez.

Jessie had expressed interest in modelling (Maurice initially mishears this as "yodelling"), and Maurice arranges for Jessie to model nude for an art class. As a result of Jessie posing for the art class, and inspired by his favourite painting, Maurice decides to give Jessie the nickname "Venus". Maurice and Jessie develop a passive/aggressive relationship over the course of the film. Maurice is forward in terms of his attraction towards Jessie, while Jessie occasionally indulges his whims to a limited extent, such as touching her hand and smelling her neck, but also retracts the indulgences when she feels that he has gone too far. The plot of the film revolves around the evolving friendship or relationship between the two characters. For Maurice, this appears to be the last attempt at something approaching a love life, as his prostate operation has left him impotent. For Jessie, it is less clear what she sees in Maurice. During the course of the film, we see her do everything from exploiting him (trying to get him to buy her presents, trying to use his flat to have sex with a boy), taking care of him, flirting with him, and rejecting him sexually to engaging with him as a friend. During the course of the film, we learn that she has been rejected by her mother and great-uncle for her promiscuous lifestyle; it is implied that she is drawn to Maurice because he does not judge her as harshly as her family members have.

The plot comes to a head when Jessie becomes involved with a boy. The two young lovers persuade Maurice to take a walk so that they can have sex. Maurice initially obliges, but returns to kick them out of his flat. A scuffle ensues, and as Maurice raises his walking stick to hit the boy, Jessie grabs it to disarm him, and he falls over a footstool, injuring himself. Jessie leaves with the boy, but she later returns to check on Maurice. When the paramedics arrive, Maurice claims he cannot remember who attacked him, much to Jessie's surprise. Then Maurice calls for "Venus" to take care of him. Jessie, remorseful, agrees to look after Maurice. Some time later, after Maurice has at least partly recovered, he takes Jessie to the seaside at Whitstable in Kent. As they sit down by the water, Maurice says to Jessie, "Now, we can really talk", and dies, leaning on her. At the memorial service, Jessie meets Maurice's ex-wife Valerie, who could not find satisfaction in Maurice's love life either. The last scene shows Jessie and others posing as models for the Venus character.

== Cast ==
- Peter O'Toole as Maurice Russell
- Leslie Phillips as Ian
- Jodie Whittaker as Jessie
- Bronson Webb as Jessie's Boyfriend
- Richard Griffiths as Donald
- Vanessa Redgrave as Valerie
- Cathryn Bradshaw as Jillian
- Harvey Virdi as Art School Teacher
- Ashley Madekwe as Royal Court Actress
- Kellie Shirley as Royal Court Actress
- Ony Uhiara as Royal Court Actress
- Andrea Riseborough as Period Film Lover
- Tom Mison as Period Film Lover
- Christine Bottomley as Hospital Nurse
- Lolita Chakrabarti as Health Centre Nurse
- Sam Spruell as Hospital Director

== Filming ==
Filming began in November 2005, with a break for the Christmas/New Year period. O'Toole fell and broke his hip on Boxing Day 2005, which meant filming did not begin again until the end of January 2006.

A scene featuring plaques of actors was shot in St Paul's, Covent Garden.

== Reception ==
Venus received positive reviews from critics, and has a score of 88% on Rotten Tomatoes, based on 154 reviews, with an average rating of 7.3/10. The critical consensus states: "Audiences may attend to witness Peter O'Toole's Oscar-worthy performance, but they'll also be treated to a humane, tender exploration of maturing with both dignity and irreverence." The film also has a score of 82 out of 100 on Metacritic, based on 32 critics. It was nominated for five British Independent Film Awards, and earned Academy Award, Actor Award, BAFTA Award, and Golden Globe Award nominations for Best Actor for O'Toole. Leslie Phillips also received a BAFTA nomination for Best Supporting Actor.

O'Toole's Oscar nomination marked his eighth, and final, Best Actor nomination over a span of forty-five years. On 25 February 2007, at the 79th Academy Awards, he was beaten by Forest Whitaker (The Last King of Scotland), making O'Toole's eight nominations without victory a record. This would be his last nomination before his death in 2013.

== Score ==
The film's score includes songs from British singer Corinne Bailey Rae's debut album. Additional music was composed and performed by David Arnold. The Slavonic Dance No. 2 in E minor, from Czech composer Antonín Dvořák's second set of Slavonic Dances, also features prominently.
