= Peter O'Toole =

English and Irish actor (1932–2013)

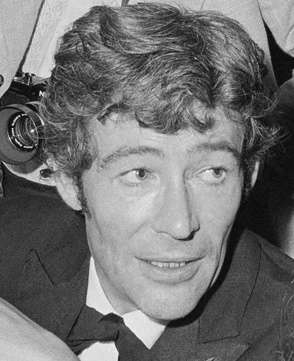
- O'Toole in 1970
- Born: Peter James O'Toole; 2 August 1932; Leeds, (Note: Records from the Leeds General Register Office confirm he was born at St James's University Hospital on 2 August 1932.) West Riding of Yorkshire, England
- Died: 14 December 2013 (aged 81); St John's Wood, London, England
- Citizenship: United Kingdom; Ireland
- Education: Royal Academy of Dramatic Art
- Occupations: Actor; author
- Years active: 1954–2012
- Notable work: Full list
- Spouse: Siân Phillips (m. 1959; div. 1979)
- Partner: Karen Brown (1982–1988)
- Children: 3, including Kate
- Awards: Full list

Peter James O'Toole (/oʊˈtuːl/; 2 August 1932 – 14 December 2013) was an English and Irish actor. Known for his work on stage and screen, he received various accolades, including an Academy Honorary Award, a BAFTA Award, a Primetime Emmy Award, and four Golden Globe Awards, in addition to nominations for a Grammy Award and a Laurence Olivier Award.

O'Toole started his training at the Royal Academy of Dramatic Art (RADA) in London and began working in the theatre, gaining recognition as a Shakespearean actor at the Bristol Old Vic and with the English Stage Company. In 1959, he made his West End debut in The Long and the Short and the Tall, and played the title role in Hamlet in the National Theatre's first production in 1963. Excelling on stage, O'Toole was known for his "hellraiser" lifestyle off-stage. He received a nomination for the Laurence Olivier Award for Best Comedy Performance for his portrayal of Jeffrey Bernard in the play Jeffrey Bernard Is Unwell (1990).

Making his film debut in 1959, O'Toole received his first Academy Award for Best Actor nomination for portraying T. E. Lawrence in the historical epic Lawrence of Arabia (1962). He was further Oscar-nominated for playing King Henry II in both Becket (1964) and The Lion in Winter (1968), a public school teacher in Goodbye, Mr. Chips (1969), a paranoid schizophrenic in The Ruling Class (1972), a ruthless film director in The Stunt Man (1980), a film actor in My Favorite Year (1982), and an elderly man in Venus (2006). He holds the record for the most Oscar nominations for acting without a win (tied with Glenn Close). In 2002, he was awarded the Academy Honorary Award for his career achievements.

O'Toole also starred in films such as What's New Pussycat? (1965), How to Steal a Million (1966), Man of La Mancha (1972), Caligula (1979), Zulu Dawn (1979), and Supergirl (1984), with supporting roles in The Last Emperor (1987), Bright Young Things (2003), Troy (2004), Stardust (2007), and Dean Spanley (2008). He voiced Anton Ego, the restaurant critic in Pixar's animated film Ratatouille (2007). On television, he received the Primetime Emmy Award for Outstanding Supporting Actor in a Limited Series or Movie for his portrayal of Bishop Pierre Cauchon in the CBS miniseries Joan of Arc (1999). He was Emmy-nominated for his performances as Lucius Flavius Silva in the ABC miniseries Masada (1981), and Paul von Hindenburg in the miniseries Hitler: The Rise of Evil (2003).

== Early life and education ==
Peter O'Toole was born on 2 August 1932, the son of Constance Jane Eliot (née Ferguson), a Scottish nurse, and Patrick Joseph "Spats" O'Toole, an Irish metal plater, football player, and bookmaker. O'Toole claimed he was not certain of his birthplace or date, stating in his autobiography that he accepted 2 August as his birth date but had birth certificates from England and Ireland. The birth certificate recorded at the Leeds General Register Office says he was born at St James's University Hospital in Leeds, Yorkshire, England, on 2 August 1932, and named Peter James O'Toole. He later affected the Irish equivalent "Seamus" as his middle name. O'Toole had an elder sister named Patricia and grew up in the south Leeds suburb of Hunslet. When he was one year old, his family began a five-year tour of major racecourse towns in Northern England. He and his sister were brought up in their father's Catholic faith. O'Toole was evacuated from Leeds early in the Second World War, and went to a Catholic school for seven or eight years, St Joseph's Secondary School in Hunslet, Leeds. He later said, "I used to be scared stiff of the nuns: their whole denial of womanhood—the black dresses and the shaving of the hair—was so horrible, so terrifying. [...] Of course, that's all been stopped. They're sipping gin and tonic in the Dublin pubs now, and a couple of them flashed their pretty ankles at me just the other day."

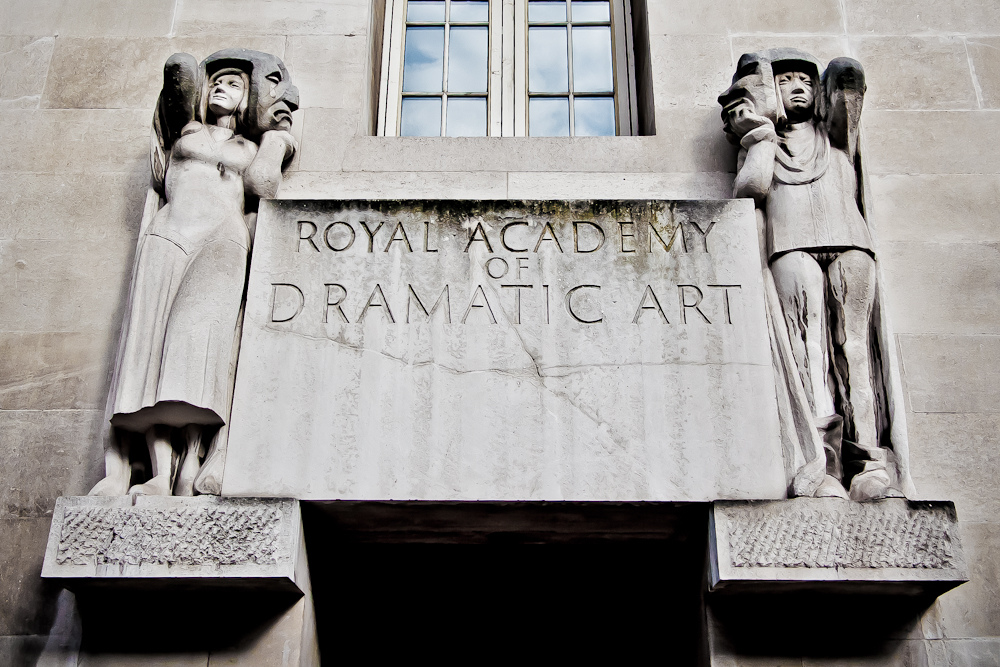
O'Toole studied at the Royal Academy of Dramatic Art (RADA) in London from 1952 to 1954

Upon leaving school, O'Toole obtained employment as a trainee journalist and photographer on the Yorkshire Evening Post, until he was called up for national service as a signaller in the Royal Navy. As reported in a radio interview in 2006 on NPR, he was asked by an officer whether he had something he had always wanted to do. His reply was that he had always wanted to try being either a poet or an actor.

He attended the Royal Academy of Dramatic Art (RADA) in London from 1952 to 1954 on a scholarship. This came after being rejected by the Abbey Theatre's drama school in Dublin by the director Ernest Blythe, because he could not speak the Irish language. At RADA, he was in the same class as Albert Finney, Alan Bates and Brian Bedford. O'Toole described this as "the most remarkable class the academy ever had, though we weren't reckoned for much at the time. We were all considered dotty."

== Acting career ==
=== 1954–1961: Early work and rise to prominence ===
O'Toole began working in the theatre, gaining recognition as a Shakespearean actor at the Bristol Old Vic and with the English Stage Company, before making his television debut in 1954. He played a soldier in an episode of The Scarlet Pimpernel in 1954. He was based at the Bristol Old Vic from 1956 to 1958, appearing in productions of King Lear, The Recruiting Officer, Major Barbara, Othello, and The Slave of Truth (all 1956). He was Henry Higgins in Pygmalion, Lysander in A Midsummer Night's Dream, Uncle Gustave in Oh! My Papa!, and Jimmy Porter in Look Back in Anger (all 1957). O'Toole was Tanner in Shaw's Man and Superman (1958), a performance he reprised often during his career, including an 1982 production that toured and then played at the Haymarket Theatre in London. He was also in Hamlet, The Holiday, Amphitryon '38, and Waiting for Godot (as Vladimir; all 1958). He hoped The Holiday would take him to the West End but it ultimately folded in the provinces; during that show he met Siân Phillips who became his first wife.

O'Toole continued to appear on television, being in episodes of Armchair Theatre ("The Pier", 1957), and BBC Sunday-Night Theatre ("The Laughing Woman", 1958) and was in the TV adaptation of The Castiglioni Brothers (1958). He made his London debut in a musical, Oh, My Papa. He gained fame on the West End in the play The Long and the Short and the Tall, performed at the Royal Court beginning in January 1959. His co-stars included Robert Shaw and Edward Judd, and it was directed by Lindsay Anderson. O'Toole reprised his performance for television on Theatre Night in 1959 (although he did not appear in the 1961 film version). The show transferred to the West End in April and won O'Toole Best Actor of the Year in 1959.

O'Toole was in much demand. He reportedly received five offers of long-term contracts but turned them down. His first role was a small role in Disney's version of Kidnapped (1960), playing the bagpipes opposite Peter Finch. His second feature was The Savage Innocents (1960) with Anthony Quinn for director Nicholas Ray, although his voice was dubbed by that of another actor. With his then wife Sian Phillips he did Siwan: The King's Daughter (1960) for TV. In 1960 he had a nine-month season at the Royal Shakespeare Company in Stratford, appearing in The Taming of the Shrew (as Petruchio), The Merchant of Venice (as Shylock) and Troilus and Cressida (as Thersites). He could have made more money in films but said "You've got to go to Stratford when you've got the chance."

O'Toole had been seen in The Long and the Short and the Tall by Jules Buck who later established a company with the actor. Buck cast O'Toole in The Day They Robbed the Bank of England (1960), a heist thriller from director John Guillermin. O'Toole was billed third, beneath Aldo Ray and Elizabeth Sellars. The following year he appeared in several episodes of the TV series Rendezvous ("End of a Good Man", "Once a Horseplayer", "London-New York"). He lost the role in the film adaptation of Long and the Short and the Tall to Laurence Harvey. "It broke my heart", he said later.

=== 1962–1972: Lawrence of Arabia and stardom ===
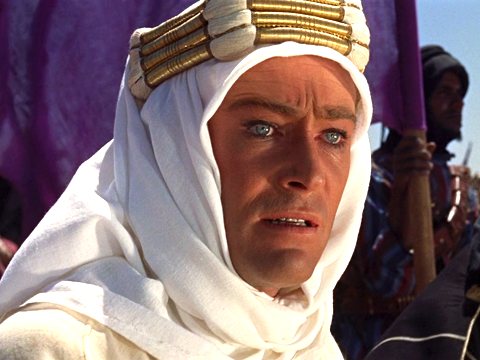
O'Toole as T. E. Lawrence in Lawrence of Arabia (1962)

O'Toole's major break came in November 1960 when he was chosen to play the eponymous hero T. E. Lawrence in Sir David Lean's epic Lawrence of Arabia (1962), after Albert Finney reportedly turned down the part. The role introduced him to a global audience and earned him the first of his eight nominations for the Academy Award for Best Actor. He received the BAFTA Award for Best British Actor. His performance was ranked number one in Premiere magazine's list of the 100 Greatest Performances of All Time. In 2003, Lawrence as portrayed by O'Toole was selected as the tenth-greatest hero in cinema history by the American Film Institute. Janet Maslin of The New York Times wrote in 1989 "The then unknown Peter O'Toole, with his charmingly diffident manner and his hair and eyes looking unnaturally gold and blue, accounted for no small part of this film's appeal to impressionable young fans".

O'Toole played Hamlet under Laurence Olivier's direction in the premiere production of the Royal National Theatre in 1963. The casting of O'Toole as the Dane was met with some controversy with Michael Gambon describing him as a "god with bright blonde hair". On playing the role, O'Toole stated he was "sick with nerves", adding "If you want to know what it's like to be lonely, really lonely, try playing Hamlet." The Times wrote, "Mr O'Toole, like Olivier, is an electrifyingly outgoing actor, and it is a surprise to see him make his first appearance...with his features twisted into melancholy" He performed in Baal (1963) at the Phoenix Theatre.

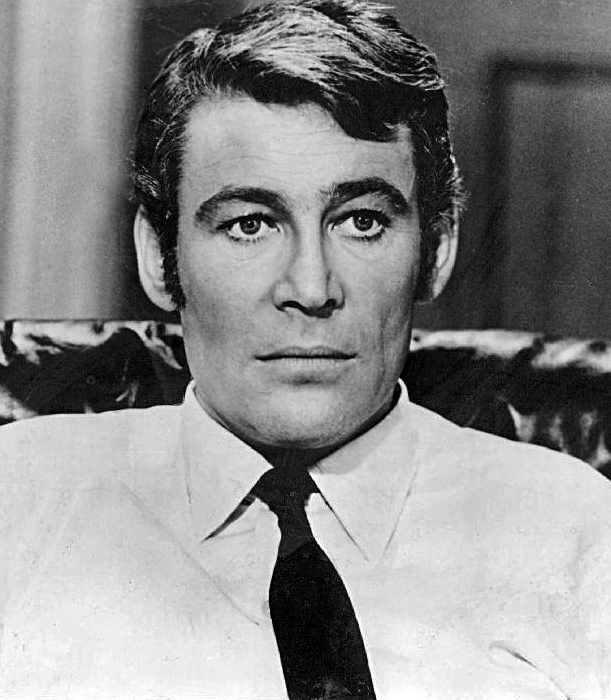
O'Toole in the TV film Present Laughter (1968)

Even prior to the making of Lawrence of Arabia, O'Toole announced he wanted to form a production company with Jules Buck. In November 1961 they said their company, known as Keep Films (also known as Tricolor Productions) would make a film starring Terry-Thomas, Operation Snatch. In 1962 O'Toole and Buck announced they wanted to make a version of Waiting for Godot for £80,000. The film was never made. Instead their first production was Becket (1964), where O'Toole played King Henry II opposite Richard Burton. The film, done in association with Hal Wallis, was a financial success.

O'Toole turned down the lead role in The Cardinal (1963). Instead he and Buck made another epic, Lord Jim (1965), based on the novel by Joseph Conrad directed by Richard Brooks. He and Buck intended to follow this with a biopic of Will Adams and a film about the Charge of the Light Brigade, but neither project happened. Instead O'Toole went into What's New Pussycat? (1965), a comedy based on a script by Woody Allen, taking over a role originally meant for Warren Beatty and starring alongside Peter Sellers. It was a huge success. He and Buck helped produce The Party's Over (1965). O'Toole returned to the stage with Ride a Cock Horse at the Piccadilly Theatre in 1965, which was harshly reviewed. He made a heist film with Audrey Hepburn, How to Steal a Million (1966), directed by William Wyler. He played the Three Angels in the all-star The Bible: In the Beginning... (1966), directed by John Huston. In 1966 at the Gaiety Theatre in Dublin he appeared in productions of Juno and the Paycock and Man and Superman.

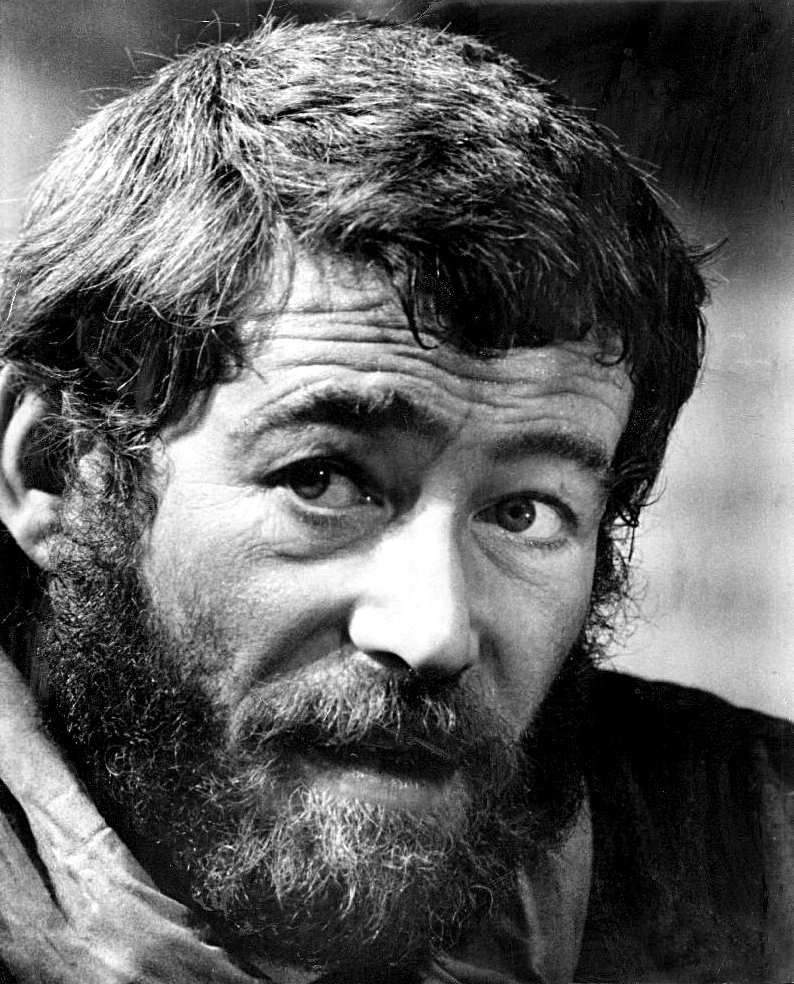
As King Henry II in The Lion in Winter (1968)

Sam Spiegel, producer of Lawrence of Arabia, reunited O'Toole with Omar Sharif in The Night of the Generals (1967), which was a box office disappointment. O'Toole played in an adaptation of Noël Coward's Present Laughter for TV in 1968, and had a cameo in Casino Royale (1967). He played Henry II again in The Lion in Winter (1968) alongside Katharine Hepburn, and was nominated for an Oscar again, making him only the second actor to be nominated twice for playing the same character in two different films. (Note: The first was Bing Crosby, while Al Pacino, Paul Newman, Cate Blanchett and Sylvester Stallone have all done the same since.) The film was also successful at the box office. Less popular was Great Catherine (1968) with Jeanne Moreau, an adaptation of the play by George Bernard Shaw which Buck and O'Toole co-produced. In 1969, he played the title role in the film Goodbye, Mr. Chips, a musical adaptation of James Hilton's novella, starring opposite Petula Clark. He was nominated for an Academy Award as Best Actor and won a Golden Globe Award for Best Actor – Motion Picture Musical or Comedy. O'Toole fulfilled a lifetime ambition in 1970 when he performed on stage in Samuel Beckett's Waiting for Godot, alongside Donal McCann, at Dublin's Abbey Theatre.

In other films, he played a man in love with his sister (played by Susannah York) in Country Dance (1970). O'Toole starred in a war film for director Peter Yates, Murphy's War (1971), appearing alongside Sian Phillips. He was reunited with Richard Burton in a film version of Under Milk Wood (1972) by Dylan Thomas, produced by himself and Buck; Elizabeth Taylor co-starred. The film was not a popular success. He received another Academy Award for Best Actor nomination for his performance in The Ruling Class (1972), done for his own company. In 1972, he played both Miguel de Cervantes and his fictional creation Don Quixote in Man of La Mancha, the motion picture adaptation of the 1965 hit Broadway musical, opposite Sophia Loren. The film was a critical and commercial failure, criticised for using mostly non-singing actors. His singing was dubbed by tenor Simon Gilbert, but the other actors did their own singing. O'Toole and co-star James Coco, who played both Cervantes's manservant and Sancho Panza, both received Golden Globe nominations for their performances.

=== 1973–1999: Established actor ===
O'Toole did not make a film for several years. He performed at the Bristol Old Vic from 1973 to 1974 in Uncle Vanya, Plunder, The Apple Cart and Judgement. He returned to films with Rosebud (1975), a flop thriller for Otto Preminger, in which O'Toole replaced Robert Mitchum at the last minute. He followed it with Man Friday (1975), an adaptation of the Robinson Crusoe story, which was the last work from Keep Films. O'Toole made Foxtrot (1976), directed by Arturo Ripstein. He was critically acclaimed for his performance in Rogue Male (1976) for British television. He did Dead Eyed Dicks on stage in Sydney in 1976. Less well received was Power Play (1978), made in Canada, and Zulu Dawn (1979), shot in South Africa. He toured Uncle Vanya and Present Laughter on stage. In 1979, O'Toole starred as Tiberius in the controversial Penthouse-funded biopic Caligula acting alongside Malcolm McDowell, Helen Mirren and John Gielgud.

In 1980, he received critical acclaim for playing the director in the behind-the-scenes film The Stunt Man. His performance earned him an Oscar nomination. He appeared in a mini-series for Irish TV, Strumpet City, in which he played James Larkin. He followed this with another mini-series, Masada (1981), playing Lucius Flavius Silva. In 1980, he performed in Macbeth at the Old Vic for $500 a week (equivalent to $2,000 in 2025), a performance that famously earned O'Toole some of the worst reviews of his career.

O'Toole was nominated for another Oscar for My Favorite Year (1982), a light romantic comedy about the behind-the-scenes at a 1950s TV variety-comedy show, in which O'Toole plays an ageing swashbuckling film star reminiscent of Errol Flynn. He returned to the stage in London with a performance in Man and Superman (1982) that was better received than his Macbeth. He focused on television, doing an adaptation of Man and Superman (1983), Svengali (1983), Pygmalion (1984), and Kim (1984), and providing the voice of Sherlock Holmes for a series of animated TV movies. He played in Pygmalion on stage in 1984 at the West End's Shaftesbury Theatre.

O'Toole returned to feature films in Supergirl (1984), Creator (1985), Club Paradise (1986), The Last Emperor (1987) as Sir Reginald Johnston, and High Spirits (1988). He appeared on Broadway in an adaptation of Pygmalion (1987), opposite Amanda Plummer. It ran for 113 performances.

He won a Laurence Olivier Award for his performance in Jeffrey Bernard Is Unwell (1989). His other appearances that decade include Uncle Silas (1989) for television. O'Toole's performances in the 1990s include Wings of Fame (1990); The Rainbow Thief (1990), with Sharif; King Ralph (1991) with John Goodman; Isabelle Eberhardt (1992); Rebecca's Daughters (1992), in Wales; Civvies (1992), a British TV series; The Seventh Coin (1993); Heaven & Hell: North & South, Book III (1994), for American TV; and Heavy Weather (1995), for British TV. He was in an adaptation of Gulliver's Travels (1996), playing the Emperor of Lilliput; FairyTale: A True Story (1997), playing Sir Arthur Conan Doyle; Phantoms (1998), from a novel by Dean Koontz; and Molokai: The Story of Father Damien (1999). He won a Primetime Emmy Award for his role as Bishop Pierre Cauchon in the 1999 mini-series Joan of Arc. He also produced and starred in a TV adaptation of Jeffrey Bernard Is Unwell (1999).

=== 2000–2013: Resurgence and final roles ===
O'Toole's work in the next decade included Global Heresy (2002); The Final Curtain (2003); Bright Young Things (2003); Hitler: The Rise of Evil (2003) for TV, as Paul von Hindenburg; and Imperium: Augustus (2004) as Augustus. In 2004, he played King Priam in Troy. In 2005, he appeared on television as the older version of legendary 18th-century Italian adventurer Giacomo Casanova in the BBC drama serial Casanova. The younger Casanova, on screen for most of the action, was played by David Tennant, who had to wear contact lenses to match his brown eyes to O'Toole's blue. He followed it with a role in Lassie (2005).

O'Toole was once again nominated for the Best Actor Academy Award for his portrayal of Maurice in the 2006 film Venus, directed by Roger Michell, his eighth such nomination. He was in One Night with the King (2007) and co-starred in the Pixar animated film Ratatouille (2007), an animated film about a rat with dreams of becoming the greatest chef in Paris, as Anton Ego, a food critic. He had a small role in Stardust (2007). O'Toole also appeared in the second season of Showtime's drama series The Tudors (2008), portraying Pope Paul III, who excommunicates King Henry VIII from the church, an act which leads to a confrontation between the two men in seven of the ten episodes. Also in 2008, he starred with Jeremy Northam and Sam Neill in the New Zealand/British film Dean Spanley, based on an Alan Sharp adaptation of Irish author Lord Dunsany's short novel, My Talks with Dean Spanley.

O'Toole appeared in Thomas Kinkade's Christmas Cottage (2008) and Iron Road (2009), a Canadian-Chinese miniseries. O'Toole's final performances were in Eldorado (2012) and For Greater Glory: The True Story of Cristiada (2012). On 10 July 2012, O'Toole released a statement announcing his retirement from acting. A number of films were released after his retirement and death: Decline of an Empire (2013), as Gallus, and Diamond Cartel (2017).

== Personal life ==
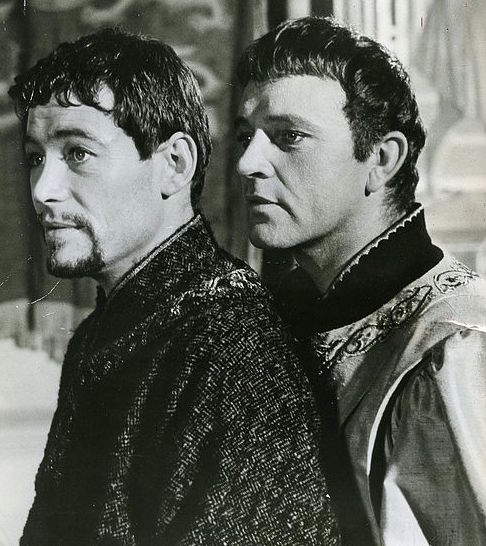
O'Toole (left) with Richard Burton in Becket (1964). The two actors, along with Richard Harris and Oliver Reed, were among a close group of friends who excelled on both stage and screen, and were known as "hellraisers" in their personal lives.

=== Views ===
While studying at RADA in the early 1950s, O'Toole opposed the Korean War, and later became a supporter of the Campaign for Nuclear Disarmament. During the 1960s, he was involved in the opposition to United States involvement in the Vietnam War. He played a role in the creation of the current form of the well-known Irish folk song "Carrickfergus" which he related to Dominic Behan, who put it in print and made a recording in the mid-1960s.

Although he lost faith in organised religion as a teenager, O'Toole expressed positive sentiments regarding the life of Jesus Christ. In an interview for The New York Times, he said "No one can take Jesus away from me... there's no doubt there was a historical figure of tremendous importance, with enormous notions. Such as peace." He called himself "a retired Christian" who prefers "an education and reading and facts" to faith.

British Pakistani playwright Hanif Kureishi states in his memoir that O'Toole told him "The only Paki I ever liked was Omar Sharif."

=== Ireland ===
The son of an Irishman, O’Toole had a strong affinity with Ireland and on occasion referred to himself as Irish: “I consider myself to be an Irishman but I have lived most of my life in England so I am a pretty bogus Irish actor as such”. In an interview with Charlie Rose in 1992 he said Irishness was “almost the centre of my very being” and that “Everything I think of is coloured by its history, by its literature, by its people, by its geography”. He recalls that he was “a bit of a misfit, a bit of an odd man out” but that when he went to County Kerry, Ireland in 1946 he realized “I wasn’t different at all”.

He possessed an Irish passport and believed he may have been born in Connemara. He owned a house in Ireland located in Clifden, County Galway. In 1969, he met future Irish president Michael D. Higgins and the two developed a friendship.

His son Lorcan was born in Dublin in 1983. He told his friends that he wanted him to be "raised as an Irishman".

=== Relationships ===
In 1959, O'Toole married Welsh actress Siân Phillips, with whom he had two daughters: actress Kate and Patricia. They were divorced in 1979. Phillips later said in two autobiographies that O'Toole had subjected her to mental cruelty, largely fuelled by drinking, and was subject to bouts of extreme jealousy when she finally left him for a younger lover.

O'Toole and his girlfriend, model Karen Brown, had a son, Lorcan O'Toole (born 17 March 1983), when O'Toole was 50 years old. Lorcan, now an actor, was a pupil at Harrow School, boarding at West Acre from 1996.

=== Sports ===
O'Toole played rugby league as a child in Leeds and was also a rugby union fan, attending Five Nations matches with friends and fellow rugby fans Richard Harris, Kenneth Griffith, Peter Finch and Richard Burton. He was also a lifelong player, coach and enthusiast of cricket and a fan of Sunderland A.F.C. His support of Sunderland was passed on to him through his father, who was a labourer in Sunderland for many years. He was named their most famous fan. The actor in a later interview expressed that he no longer considered himself as much of a fan following the demolition of Roker Park and the subsequent move to the Stadium of Light. He described Roker Park as his last connection to the club and that everything "they meant to him was when they were at Roker Park".

=== Health ===
Severe illness almost ended O'Toole's life in the late 1970s. His stomach cancer was misdiagnosed as resulting from his alcoholic excess. O'Toole underwent surgery in 1976 to have his pancreas and a large portion of his stomach removed, which resulted in insulin-dependent diabetes. In 1978, he nearly died from a hematologic disease. He eventually recovered and returned to work. He resided on Sky Road, just outside Clifden, Connemara, County Galway, from 1963, and at the height of his career maintained homes in Dublin, London, and Paris (at the Ritz, which was where his character supposedly lived in the film How to Steal a Million).

=== Interests and influences ===
In an interview with NPR in December 2006, O'Toole revealed that he knew all 154 of Shakespeare's sonnets. A self-described romantic, O'Toole said of the sonnets that nothing in the English language compares with them, and that he read them daily. In Venus (2006), he recites Sonnet 18 ("Shall I compare thee to a summer's day?").

O'Toole wrote two memoirs. Loitering with Intent: The Child chronicles his childhood in the years leading up to the Second World War, and was a New York Times Notable Book of the Year in 1992. His second, Loitering With Intent: The Apprentice, is about his years spent training with a cadre of friends at RADA.

O'Toole was interviewed at least three times by Charlie Rose on his eponymous talk show. In a 17 January 2007 interview, O'Toole stated that British actor Eric Porter had most influenced him, adding that the difference between actors of yesterday and today is that actors of his generation were trained for "theatre, theatre, theatre". He also believes that the challenge for the actor is "to use his imagination to link to his emotion" and that "good parts make good actors." However, in other venues (including the DVD commentary for Becket), O'Toole credited Donald Wolfit as being his most important mentor.

=== Death and legacy ===
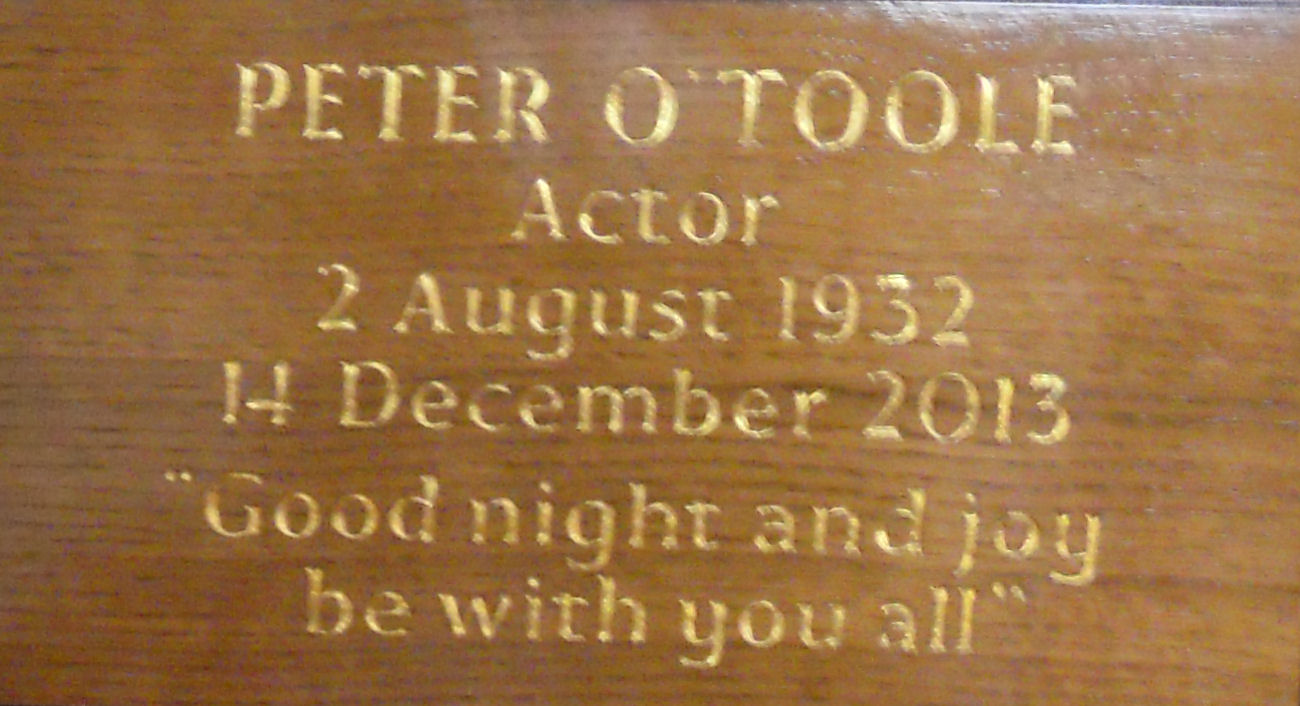
O'Toole's memorial plaque in St Paul's Church in Covent Garden, London

O'Toole retired from acting in July 2012 owing to a recurrence of stomach cancer. He died on 14 December 2013 at the Wellington Hospital in St John's Wood, London, at the age of 81. His funeral was held at Golders Green Crematorium in London on 21 December 2013, where his body was cremated in a wicker coffin. His family stated their intention to fulfil his wishes and take his ashes to the west of Ireland.

On 18 May 2014, a new prize was launched in memory of O'Toole at the Bristol Old Vic Theatre School; this includes an annual award given to two young actors from the school, and a professional contract. He has a memorial plaque in St Paul's, the Actors' Church in Covent Garden, London.

On 21 April 2017, the Harry Ransom Center at the University of Texas at Austin announced that Kate O'Toole had placed her father's archive at the Humanities Research Centre. The collection includes O'Toole's scripts, extensive published and unpublished writings, props, photographs, letters, medical records, and more. It joins the archives of several of O'Toole's collaborators and friends, including Donald Wolfit, Eli Wallach, Peter Glenville, Sir Tom Stoppard, and Dame Edith Evans.

== Acting credits and accolades ==
O'Toole was the recipient of numerous nominations and awards. He was offered a knighthood but rejected it in objection to Prime Minister Margaret Thatcher's policies. He received four Golden Globe Awards, one BAFTA Award for Best British Actor (for Lawrence of Arabia) and one Primetime Emmy Award.

Academy Award nominations

O'Toole was nominated eight times for the Academy Award for Best Actor but was never able to win a competitive Oscar. In 2002, the Academy honoured him with an Academy Honorary Award for his entire body of work and his lifelong contribution to film. O'Toole initially balked about accepting and wrote the Academy a letter saying that he was "still in the game" and would like more time to "win the lovely bugger outright". The Academy informed him that they would bestow the award whether he wanted it or not. He told Charlie Rose in January 2007 that his children admonished him, saying that it was the highest honour one could receive in the filmmaking industry. O'Toole agreed to appear at the ceremony and receive his Honorary Oscar. It was presented to him by Meryl Streep. He joked with Robert Osborne during an interview at Turner Classic Movies' film festival that he was the "Biggest Loser of All Time" due to failure to win an Academy Award after multiple nominations.

Year	Film	Winner	Also Nominated
1962	Lawrence of Arabia	Gregory Peck – To Kill a Mockingbird	Burt Lancaster – Birdman of Alcatraz; Jack Lemmon – Days of Wine and Roses; Marcello Mastroianni – Divorce Italian Style
1964	Becket	Rex Harrison – My Fair Lady	Richard Burton – Becket; Anthony Quinn – Zorba the Greek; Peter Sellers – Dr. Strangelove
1968	The Lion in Winter	Cliff Robertson – Charly	Alan Arkin – The Heart Is a Lonely Hunter; Alan Bates – The Fixer; Ron Moody – Oliver!
1969	Goodbye, Mr. Chips	John Wayne – True Grit	Richard Burton – Anne of the Thousand Days; Dustin Hoffman – Midnight Cowboy; Jon Voight – Midnight Cowboy
1972	The Ruling Class	Marlon Brando – The Godfather (declined)	Michael Caine – Sleuth; Laurence Olivier – Sleuth; Paul Winfield – Sounder
1980	The Stunt Man	Robert De Niro – Raging Bull	Robert Duvall – The Great Santini; John Hurt – The Elephant Man; Jack Lemmon – Tribute
1982	My Favorite Year	Ben Kingsley – Gandhi	Dustin Hoffman – Tootsie; Jack Lemmon – Missing; Paul Newman – The Verdict
2006	Venus	Forest Whitaker – The Last King of Scotland	Leonardo DiCaprio – Blood Diamond; Ryan Gosling – Half Nelson; Will Smith – The Pursuit of Happyness

== Bibliography ==
- Loitering with Intent: The Child (1992)
- Loitering with Intent: The Apprentice (1997)

== See also ==
- List of Academy Award winners and nominees from Great Britain
- List of actors with Academy Award nominations
- List of actors with more than one Academy Award nomination in the acting categories
- List of actors in Royal Shakespeare Company productions
