= True Grit (film series) =

Film series article

- Official film series logo, as released in 1969.
- Starring: John Wayne; Jeff Bridges; Various actors (See below)
- Distributed by: Paramount Pictures; Universal Pictures
- Country: United States
- Language: English
- Budget: >$35,900,000 (Total of 4 films)
- Box office: $297,936,828 (Total of 3 theatrical films)

The True Grit film series consists of American western dramas, including theatrical and made-for-television installments. The plot follows the adventures of Reuben J. "Rooster" Cogburn in the Old American West, and detail his role in bringing justice to outlaws and bandits who wrongfully terrorize small towns and villages. Each movie includes his voyages with women he is tasked with protecting, despite his apprehensions.

The 1969 original film proved to be a success with a positive response from critics, and a profit at the box office. Conversely the 1975 sequel however, received mixed reception from critics and audiences alike, with commercial receipts earning a fraction of the income received through the first installment; many referred to the movie as inferior its predecessor. Similarly, the made-for-television third movie received muddled reception from critics and viewers alike, with critiques angled at its new cast and the story which was called "generic". Despite this, the 2010 adaptation was met with positive reception both critically and financially. It was later nominated for a total of 10 Oscars.

== Origin ==
The 1968 American Western novel authored by Charles Portis, serves as the origin basis of the True Grit film series. Originally released as an ongoing serial in The Saturday Evening Post, the story was compiled and released as a novel later that year through Simon & Schuster publishing. Set during the American Old West, the plot centers around Mattie Ross who recounts the events from her past, when she with the help of a U.S. Marshal named Reuben J. "Rooster" Cogburn sought justice for her murdered father and pursued an outlaw. The novel was considered the book to be classic literature and categorically a Great American Novel.

When the film rights were acquired by Paramount Pictures, filmmaker Henry Hathaway optioned to take a more fictionalized approach to the story stating that he viewed the novel as "a fairytale... a fantasy that I couched in as realistic terms as possible."

== Films ==
Film	U.S. release date	Director	Screenwriter(s)	Producer(s)
True Grit	June 13, 1969	Henry Hathaway	Marguerite Roberts	Hal B. Wallis
Rooster Cogburn (...and the Lady)	November 7, 1975	Stuart Millar	Martin Julien	Hal B. Wallis
True Grit: A Further Adventure	May 19, 1978	Richard T. Heffron	Sandor Stern	Sandor Stern
True Grit	December 22, 2010	Joel Coen & Ethan Coen	Joel Coen & Ethan Coen	Joel Coen, Ethan Coen and Scott Rudin

=== True Grit (1969) ===
After an outlaw named Tom Chaney murders her father, Mattie Ross seeks the help of a U.S. Marshal named Reuben J. "Rooster" Cogburn to assist her in continuing her pursuit to avenge her father by following Chaney into Native American territory. Along the way the pair form an alliance with a Texas Ranger named LaBoeuf, who is conducting a manhunt of his own given that Chaney is wanted for the assassination of a U.S. senator. The trio of allies find that they have their differences, as they seek to receive an award for his capture.

=== Rooster Cogburn (...and the Lady) (1975) ===
When a small village is overtaken by a group of violent outlaws, "Rooster" Cogburn is hired to defeat or apprehend the bandits. After previously being removed from his position as a U.S. Marshal due to some unruly behavior, Cogburn is determined to regain his notability and determines to also recover their hijacked shipment of explosives as well. Upon setting out on his journey, to Rooster's dismay he is once again accompanied by a young woman named Eula Goodnight; who wants to also avenge the wrongs of her town and the murder of her father. Together, the unlikely pair must work together to bring the men to justice.

=== True Grit: A Further Adventure (1978) ===
When Mattie Ross is once again in need of his assistance, "Rooster" Cogburn is hired to accompany her in the journey across the country to her grandfather's homestead. Unbeknownst to him, Mattie is determined to reform his ways and help him to become more proper along the way. Though he has apprehensions in yet again being tasked with the safety of a young woman, Rooster agrees to be her armed chaperone. Paid by the family's lawyer, the pair continue to voice their differences as they had before. Upon spending all of the money, Cogburn decides that they will make a stop at the home of the Sumner family; with intentions to in so doing complete one of the many tasks on his ever-growing list. After bringing the family the troubling news that Mr. Jake Sumner was killed, he sets out to find ways that he can assist the widowed Annie Sumner from losing the ranch, keep the Sumner boys from getting into conflicts, keeping Mattie safe, and earning more cash to assist them in their cross-country voyage.

=== True Grit (2010) ===
In March 2009, a new adaptation of the titular novel was in development. Joel and Ethan Coen were named as directors from a script of their own. The movie was described as more than a remake, serving as a more faithful adaptation of the source material. The plot would center around the character of Mattie Ross, and approach the story from her point of view as opposed to that of Reuben "Rooster" Cogburn. The project was announced to be a joint-venture production between Paramount Pictures, Skydance Productions, Mike Zoss Productions, DreamWorks Pictures, and Scott Rudin Productions. Hailee Steinfeld, Jeff Bridges, Matt Damon, and Josh Brolin lead the cast as Mattie, Rooster, LaBoeuf, and Tom Chaney, respectively.

The film was released on December 22, 2010. True Grit received critical acclaim and was a success at the box office; and was later nominated for ten Academy Awards.

== Main cast and characters ==
List indicators

This section includes characters who will appear or have appeared in the franchise in main roles.

- An empty grey cell indicates the character was not in the film, or that the character's official presence has not yet been confirmed.
- ^{C} indicates a cameo role.
- ^{V} indicates a voice-only role.

Character	Films			
Character	True Grit (1969)	Rooster Cogburn (...and the Lady)	True Grit: A Further Adventure	True Grit (2010)
Reuben J. "Rooster" Cogburn	John Wayne	John Wayne	Warren Oates	Jeff Bridges
Mattie Ross	Kim Darby		Lisa Pelikan	Hailee Steinfeld Elizabeth Marvel^{O} (Note: Ruth Morris, a real-life amputee, served as the body-double during various scenes depicting the character at an older age.)
TX Ranger LaBoeuf	Glen Campbell			Matt Damon
Tom Chaney	Jeff Corey			Josh Brolin
Emmett Quincy	Jeremy Slate			Paul Rae
"Lucky" Ned Pepper	Robert Duvall			Barry Pepper
Moon the Kid	Dennis Hopper			Domhnall Gleeson
Eula Goodnight		Katharine Hepburn		
Wolf		Richard Romancito		
Breed		Anthony Zerbe		
Hawk		Richard Jordan		
Judge Isaac C. Parker	James Westerfield	John McIntire		Jake Walker
Annie Sumner			Lee Meriwether	
Joshua Sumner			James Stephens	
Christopher Sumner			Jeff Osterhage	
Daniel Sumner			Lee Montgomery	

== Additional production and crew details ==
Film	Crew/Detail					
Film	Composer	Cinematographer	Editor	Production companies	Distributing companies	Running time
True Grit	Elmer Bernstein	Carter Burwell	Warren Low	Paramount Pictures, Hal Wallis Productions	Paramount Pictures	2 hrs 8 mins
Rooster Cogburn (...and the Lady)	Laurence Rosenthal	Harry Stradling Jr.	Robert Swink	Hal Wallis Productions, Polyphony Digital	Universal Pictures	1 hr 48 mins
True Grit: A Further Adventure	Earle Hagen	Stevan Larner	Jerry Lynn Young	Paramount Television	American Broadcasting Company (ABC)	1 hr 40 mins
True Grit (2010)	Carter Burwell	Roger Deakins	Roderick Jaynes	Paramount Pictures, DreamWorks Pictures, Skydance Productions, Scott Rudin Productions, Mike Zoss Productions	Paramount Picutures	1 hr 50 mins

== Reception ==
=== Box office and financial performance ===
Film	Box office gross			Box office ranking		Total home video sales	Budget	Worldwide net total income	Ref.
Film	North America	Other territories	Worldwide	All-time North America	All-time worldwide	Total home video sales	Budget	Worldwide net total income	Ref.
True Grit (1969)	$31,132,592	$6,527,308	$37,659,900	#2,879	#5,744	Information not publicly available	$900,000	≥$36,759,900	
Rooster Cogburn (...and the Lady)	$8,000,000	—N/a	$8,000,000	#5,734	#8,266	Information not publicly available	Information not publicly available	≤$8,000,000	
True Grit: A Further Adventure	—N/a	—N/a	—N/a	—N/a	—N/a	Information not publicly available	Information not publicly available	Information not publicly available	—N/a
True Grit (2010)	$171,243,005	$81,033,923	$252,278,285	#323	#1,334	$41,928,353	$35,000,000	$259,205,281	
Totals	$210,375,597	$87,561,231	$297,938,185	x̄ #2,234	x̄ #3,836	>$41,928,353	>$35,900,000	≥$303,965,181	

=== Critical and public response ===
Film	Rotten Tomatoes	Metacritic	CinemaScore
True Grit (1969)	88% (56 reviews)	83/100 (17 reviews)	—N/a
Rooster Cogburn (...and the Lady)	45% (11 reviews)	—N/a	—N/a
True Grit: A Further Adventure	—N/a	—N/a	—N/a
True Grit (2010)	95% (276 reviews)	80/100 (41 reviews)	B+
