= Masters of Atlantis =

1985 novel by Charles Portis

- Author: Charles Portis
- Language: English
- Publisher: Knopf
- Publication date: 1985
- Dewey Decimal: 813.54
- LC Class: PS3566.O663 M3

Masters of Atlantis is a 1985 historical fiction novel by Charles Portis. It satirizes the Western Esoteric and New Religious movements of the early-to-mid twentieth century, following a World War I veteran named Lamar Jimmerson over the course of several decades as he attempts to establish and maintain an esoteric society dedicated to what is supposedly the lost knowledge of the legendary city of Atlantis.

The novel was released to relative obscurity compared to Portis's True Grit, but came to be widely recommended among a circle of major comedians and entertainers including Michael Schur and Conan O’Brien. David Cross has a tattoo of the book’s cover on his arm. Greg Daniels cited Portis's comedic style as a major inspiration behind The Office and a feature adaptation is reportedly in the works after the rights were acquired by Michael Cera.

== Synopsis ==
=== Plot ===
In 1917, a mysterious beggar gives Lamar Jimmerson the Codex Pappus, a handwritten book allegedly containing the secrets of Atlantis. The beggar initiates Jimmerson into the Gnomon Society, and informs him of their current Master of Gnomons – Pletho Pappus. In 1919, Jimmerson travels to Malta in search of Pappus. Instead, he meets Sydney Hen and shares the Codex with him. The two study it for some time, until Sydney finally announces, "Can't you see it, man? You're already a Master! We're both Masters!" The two separate to set up their own Gnomon branches, Jimmerson in America and Sydney in Europe.

Jimmerson opens several Gnomon Temples in America, which attracts the conman Austin Popper. Austin gains power in Jimmerson's temple and tries to popularize Gnomonism in public appearances, drawing the wrath of the far more "purist" Sydney branch. Jimmerson formally "humbles" Austin in 1940, restricting him to menial work. This does not stop Sydney, who, after a dramatic return, tries to delegitimize the American branch of Gnomonism in response to both out-of-control "Popperism" and Jimmerson's attempts to rectify remaining mathematical inconsistencies in Pappus's work. The American and European Gnomon branches become splintered, and the conflict lets Austin regain his power. The Gnomon conflict is overshadowed by the beginnings of World War II.

In 1942, Austin travels to Washington, DC, with Jimmerson. Their aim is to trade Gnomon technology with the President to help win the war. They are instead lampooned and dismissed for Jimmerson's outlandish appearance when he arrives in full Gnomon ceremonial wear, while Austin makes both a friend, Cezar Golescu, and an enemy, Pharris White. In the postwar years, most Gnomon temples close down, and although still open, Jimmerson's temple remains highly neglected. Austin makes a couple of returns, after long-unexplained absences. In his first return, he schemes to help Jimmerson run for public office, but is once more chased off by White.

In Austin's second return, he helps Jimmerson and the remaining Gnomons move out of the crumbling temple. He takes them to Texas, where they are hosted by longtime Gnomon Pillar leader Morehead Moaler. Jimmerson's branch is joined by Sydney and his remaining posse and the two men reconcile. Moaler's son, Golescu, and White conspire to have the Gnomons kicked out of Texas, but fail.

=== Gnomon Society ===
Although Portis's doctrine of Gnomonism (from the Greek γνώμων; "judge" or "interpreter") is fictional, it draws heavily from a number of real-world beliefs. The concept of Atlantis as a lost civilization in the Atlantic Ocean originates with Plato's Timaeus and Critias, allegorical works of fiction later interpreted as a genuine historical account by pseudoarchaeological works such as Ignatius L. Donnelly's 1882 Antediluvian World. The Gnomon Society described by Portis is instead based on an eclectic collection of fringe organizations like Freemasonry or Scientology, with heavy reference to both mathematical knowledge and religious belief. The founding Codex of the Society is described as being physically fished out of the water of the Mediterranean Sea by the near-mythical Pletho Pappus, who recovers from it a wealth of lost scientific knowledge evocative of the geometric esoterica of Fibonacci or Pythagoras, with cones and triangles being treated almost as religious symbols of the Gnomon Society under Jimmerson.

Gnomonism experiences a deep ideological schism between the American and British branches, however Jimmerson's beliefs are also contrasted against a rival hyperdiffusionist who dismisses Atlantis as a distant echo of the "true" lost continent of Mu. Slate writer Brian Boyle cites Escape Velocity: A Charles Portis Miscellany author Jay Jennings in describing Portis's meticulous research, however also notes that the actual content of the Codex Pappus is never made clear to prevent the reader from discerning any actual scientific value in Jimmerson's teachings versus "an idiot’s interpretation of an outdated or poorly translated trigonometry textbook". Similarly, neither Pappus nor anything else from his supposed original branch of Gnomonism ever appear in the narrative, with the liaison responsible for introducing Jimmerson to the Codex vanishing soon after and leaving Jimmerson to instead begin interpreting random everyday coincidences as coded messages from Pappus.

== Reception and legacy ==
Masters of Atlantis released to a relatively mediocre reception, being overshadowed by the successes of True Grit and Norwood. In the New York Times, John Anthony West criticized the depiction of Gnomonism as lacking the imaginative elements of the cults and movements that inspired it, while L. J. Davis of the Chicago Tribune made a similarly unfavorable comparison to the fictional "Bokononism" depicted in Kurt Vonnegut's Cat's Cradle, additionally criticizing Popper's function in the plot and the seemingly abrupt ending.

The novel later developed a cult following propelled by a number of major American comedians and television personalities, including Michael Schur, Bill Hader, John Cusack, and Conan O’Brien. Michael Cera and Clark Duke both attempted to obtain adaptation rights at similar times, unaware of one another's mutual interest in the work. The rights narrowly went to Cera, who originally planned a TV adaptation titled Atlantis before instead slating the adaptation as a one of several potential directorial debuts under Masters of Atlantis. Greg Daniels discussed the novel as emblematic of the "cringe comedy" he had sought to cultivate in The Office.

Writing for Slate in 2020, less than a year after Portis's death, Brian Boyle heavily lauded Masters of Atlantis not only for its impact in the comedy world, but also as "the perfect novel to explain QAnon, to explain Trump, to explain organized religion—hell, to explain America itself", citing the humanistic portrayal of both Jimmerson and his less fortunate followers as "people simply seeking answers".

== See also ==
- Golden Age of Fraternalism
