= True Grit: A Further Adventure =

1978 TV film

- Written by: Charles Portis (characters); Sandor Stern
- Directed by: Richard T. Heffron
- Starring: Warren Oates
- Theme music composer: Earle Hagen
- Country of origin: United States
- Original language: English

Production
- Producer: Sandor Stern
- Production locations: Buckskin Joe Frontier Town & Railway - 1193 Fremont County Road 3A, Canon City, Colorado
- Cinematography: Stevan Larner
- Editor: Jerry Young
- Running time: 100 minutes
- Production company: Paramount Television

Original release
- Network: ABC
- Release: May 19, 1978

Related
- Rooster Cogburn

True Grit: A Further Adventure is a 1978 American Western television film directed by Richard T. Heffron. It is the third installment in the True Grit film series, intended as a backdoor pilot for a TV series. Warren Oates takes over the role of Rooster Cogburn in this version. Lisa Pelikan portrays Mattie Ross, played in the first film by Kim Darby. The supporting cast features Lee Meriwether and Parley Baer.

== Plot ==
Deputy U.S. Marshal Reuben J. "Rooster" Cogburn battles criminals and injustice in his own unorthodox way. He must also contend with Mattie Ross, a headstrong teenage girl determined to reform him.

== Cast ==
- Warren Oates as Reuben J. "Rooster" Cogburn
- Lisa Pelikan as Mattie Ross
- Lee Meriwether as Annie Sumner
- James Stephens as Joshua Sumner
- Jeff Osterhage as Christopher Sumner
- Lee Montgomery as Daniel Sumner
- Ramon Bieri as Sheriff Ambrose
- Parley Baer as Rollins
- Lee de Broux as Skorby
- Redmond Gleeson as Harrison
- Gregg Palmer as Slatter
- Burt Douglas as Bast
- Richard McKenzie
