= Norwood (film) =

1970 film by Jack Haley, Jr.

- Directed by: Jack Haley Jr.
- Written by: Marguerite Roberts
- Based on: Norwood; Charles Portis
- Produced by: Hal Wallis
- Starring: Glen Campbell; Kim Darby; Joe Namath; Carol Lynley; Pat Hingle; Tisha Sterling; Dom DeLuise; Jack Haley; Cass Daley
- Music by: Mac Davis; Al DeLory; Mitchell Torok, Ramona Redd
- Distributed by: Paramount Pictures
- Release dates: May 21, 1970 (Dallas, Texas)
- Running time: 96 min.
- Country: United States
- Language: English
- Box office: $1,750,000 (US/ Canada rentals)

Norwood is a 1970 American comedy film that reunites True Grit co-stars Glen Campbell and Kim Darby, also featuring Joe Namath. It was based on the novel of the same title, written by Charles Portis (who also wrote True Grit), but updated from the original 1950s setting to 1970.

The film marked the penultimate screen appearance of actor Jack Haley, the father of the director Jack Haley Jr.

== Plot ==
Norwood Pratt has just finished his enlistment in the United States Marine Corps and is on his way home from Vietnam. As a musician, his one ambition is to appear on the radio program Louisiana Hayride.

Along the way, Norwood meets a variety of characters, including Grady Fling, a flim-flam man; Yvonne Phillips, a hooker; Marie, a jaded would-be starlet; and his Marine buddy Joe William Reese.

However, the most important person that he meets is Rita Lee Chipman, the "right kind of girl," who is unfortunately an unwed soon-to-be mother at a time when this was uncommon and somewhat shameful. She supports him and is there when Norwood finally reaches the KWKH studio as his dream comes true.

== Cast ==
- Glen Campbell as Norwood
- Kim Darby as Rita
- Joe Namath as Joe
- Carol Lynley as Yvonne
- Pat Hingle as Grady Fring
- Tisha Sterling as Marie
- Dom DeLuise as Bill Bird
- Leigh French as Vernell Bird
- Meredith MacRae as Kay
- Sammy Jackson as Wayne T.E.B. Walker
- Billy Curtis as Edmund B. Ratner
- Edith Atwater as Angry Bus Passenger
- Jimmy Boyd as Jeeter
- Virginia Capers as Ernestine
- Cass Daley as Mrs. Remley
- Merie Earle as Grandma Whichcoat
- Jack Haley as Mr. Reese
- David Huddleston as Uncle Lonnie
- Gil Lamb as Mr. Remley

== Production ==
First choices for the Rita and Yvonne roles were Ali MacGraw and Nita Talbot. Principal photography started in July 1969.

The film was heavily edited at the insistence of producer Hal B. Wallis, who believed that a G rating would had improved its box-office prospects and pushed for the removal of all the most adult situations, including some re-dubbing to remove several curse words.

== Release ==
Norwood opened on May 21, 1970, in Dallas, Texas before opening in 450 theaters on May 27.

== Reception ==
The film earned $161,800 in its first week, while its total gross was just under $2 million.

Howard Thompson of The New York Times wrote that "the picture is a showcase for the guitar-playing Campbell. And it is an entirely shapeless affair that simply bumps him around the country. A pity, too, for he is a pleasant, natural actor — 'True Grit' proved that — and he sings a clutch of guitar ballads easily and winningly." Variety called it "little more than the perpetuation of the Elvis Presley format for Glen Campbell, complete with a parade of pretty faces and uninspired countryish rhythm by Presley tunesmith Mac Davis." Gene Siskel of the Chicago Tribune gave the film 1 star out of 4 and described its humor as "hokey, but harmless." Charles Champlin of the Los Angeles Times called it "an amiable, easygoing, often quite funny piece of entertainment." Richard Combs of The Monthly Film Bulletin wrote, "At its best, Marguerite Roberts' screenplay provides some amiable regional comedy; at its worst when tidying up the novel's loose ends (complete to Norwood's final appearance on country and western radio), it suggests how the material of Midnight Cowboy might have looked if turned into a vehicle for Elvis Presley."

== See also ==
- List of American films of 1970
