= Rooster Cogburn =

Rooster Cogburn may refer to:

- Rooster Cogburn (character), fictional Deputy U.S. Marshal featured in Charles Portis's novel True Grit and the subsequent films
- Rooster Cogburn (film), 1975 feature film based on the character
