= Glen Campbell Live (1969 album) =

Live album by Glen Campbell
- Released: August 1969
- Recorded: July 4, 1969
- Venue: Garden State Arts Center, Holmdel, New Jersey
- Label: Capitol
- Producer: Al De Lory

Glen Campbell chronology
True Grit (1969)	Glen Campbell Live (1969)	Try a Little Kindness (1970)

Professional ratings
Review scores
Source	Rating
Allmusic	4/5 stars

Glen Campbell Live is the first live album by American musician Glen Campbell, released by Capitol Records in 1969 (see 1969 in music). The album features live performances of most of Campbell's hits up to that point. Conspicuously absent are "Galveston" and "Wichita Lineman". The entire album was recorded live with the exception of "(Sittin' On) The Dock of the Bay" which for unknown reasons was the same studio version from Campbell's 1968 Wichita Lineman album, albeit with reverb and audience effects added to mimic a live performance.

== Track listing ==
Side 1:

1. Medley: "More / Somewhere" (Riz Ortolani, Nino Oliviero/Leonard Bernstein, Stephen Sondheim)
2. "White Lightning" (J. P. Richardson)
3. "Didn't We" (Jimmy Webb)
4. "Dreams of the Everyday Housewife" (Chris Gantry)
5. "Gotta Travel On" (Paul Clayton)
6. "(Sittin' On) The Dock of the Bay" (Steve Cropper, Otis Redding)
7. "If You Go Away" (Jacques Brel, Rod McKuen)
8. "Walk Right In" (Gus Cannon, Hosea Woods)
9. "The Impossible Dream" (Mitch Leigh, Joe Darion)
10. "Gentle on My Mind" (John Hartford)
11. "Where's the Playground Susie" (Jimmy Webb)
12. "Good Ole Mountain Dew" (Traditional; arranged by Glen Campbell)
13. "You All Come" (Arlie Duff)
14. "By the Time I Get to Phoenix" (Webb)
15. "For Once in My Life" (Ron Miller, Orlando Murden)
16. "It's Over" (Jimmie Rodgers)
17. "Yakety Sax" (Boots Randolph, James Rich)
18. "The Lord's Prayer" (Albert Hay Malotte)

== Personnel ==
- Glen Campbell – vocals, acoustic guitar, electric guitar
- Bob Felts – drums
- Billy Graham – bass guitar, harmony vocals
- Al Casey – acoustic guitar
- Dennis McCarthy – piano
- The Garden State Arts Center Orchestra

== Production ==
- Producer – Al De Lory
- Arranged by Al De Lory, Marty Paich, Dennis McCarthy
- Conductor – Al De Lory
- Engineers – Bob Arnold, Don Henderson, Joe Polito
- Remastered in 2008 by Andrew Thompson/Sound Performance Studios, London, England

== Charts ==
Album – Billboard (United States)

Chart	Entry date	Peak position	No. of weeks
Billboard Country Albums	September 20, 1969	2(1)	31
Billboard 200	1969	13	29
