= True Grit (1969 film) =

American western film

- Theatrical release poster
- Directed by: Henry Hathaway
- Screenplay by: Marguerite Roberts
- Based on: True Grit by Charles Portis
- Produced by: Hal B. Wallis
- Starring: John Wayne; Glen Campbell; Kim Darby; Jeremy Slate; Robert Duvall; Strother Martin
- Cinematography: Lucien Ballard
- Edited by: Warren Low
- Music by: Elmer Bernstein
- Distributed by: Paramount Pictures
- Release dates: June 12, 1969 (Little Rock premiere); June 13, 1969 (Los Angeles)
- Running time: 128 minutes
- Country: United States
- Language: English
- Box office: $31.1 million

True Grit is a 1969 American Western film directed by Henry Hathaway and produced by Hal B. Wallis. Starring John Wayne as Deputy U.S. Marshal Reuben Rooster Cogburn and with Glen Campbell as a Texas Ranger and Kim Darby. The film is adapted by Marguerite Roberts from Charles Portis' 1968 novel of the same name.

The story follows Ft. Smith, Arkansas Deputy U.S. Marshal Cogburn and Texas Ranger La Boeuf (Campbell) as they are hired by a 14 year old young girl, Mattie Ross (Darby), to apprehend the outlaw who killed her father and fled to Indian Territory. Historians believe Cogburn was based on real-life Old West Deputy U.S. Marshal Henry "Heck" Thomas, who worked out of the Western District of Arkansas and covered the Indian Territory. Thomas had brought in some of the most wanted fugitives and toughest outlaws. The cast also features Robert Duvall, Dennis Hopper, Jeff Corey and Strother Martin.

The film was released by Paramount Pictures on June 13, 1969. It received positive reviews from critics, who drew particular praise to Wayne's performance, and was a commercial success. Wayne won the Academy Award for Best Actor and the Golden Globe Award for Best Actor in a Motion Picture – Drama, his only competitive win for either institution. The film also received an Oscar nomination for Best Original Song, and Darby received a BAFTA Award nomination for Most Promising Newcomer.

True Grit's success spawned a 1975 theatrical film sequel with Wayne again reprising his character in Rooster Cogburn, a 1978 television film sequel starring Warren Oates True Grit: A Further Adventure, and an acclaimed 2010 remake film of the same name directed by the Coen brothers and starring Jeff Bridges.

== Plot ==
In 1880, teenager Mattie Ross travels to Fort Smith, Arkansas, following the murder of her father there by his hired hand, Tom Chaney. Seeking justice, Mattie hires Rooster Cogburn—an aging, alcoholic, one-eyed U.S. Marshal—to help track him down, as Chaney has fled into Indian Territory and joined the gang of outlaw "Lucky" Ned Pepper, who previously escaped Cogburn's custody. Also in town is young Texas Ranger La Boeuf, who is pursuing Chaney for the murder of a Texas senator. He offers Cogburn a share of the reward money to bring Chaney back to Texas, despite Mattie's insistence that he be hanged in Fort Smith.

Cogburn and La Boeuf set off, taking a ferry crossing with their horses and leaving Mattie behind. Undeterred, she crosses the deep river on her horse, earning Cogburn's reluctant admiration. After a failed attempt to lose her, the pair begrudgingly agree to let her join them.

Days later, the group comes across a remote cabin occupied by horse thieves Emmett Quincy and Moon. After shooting Moon in the leg, Cogburn interrogates them. Desperate for a doctor, Moon begins to talk, prompting Quincy to fatally stab him; Cogburn then shoots Quincy dead. Before dying, Moon reveals that Pepper and his gang are expected at the cabin that night for fresh horses. Cogburn and La Boeuf set up an ambush nearby. When Pepper arrives, he fires a warning shot, and La Boeuf—mistakenly thinking Cogburn has opened fire—kills Pepper's horse. A firefight ensues, in which two gang members are killed, but Pepper and the rest escape. The group brings the bodies to McAlester's store, where Cogburn tries unsuccessfully to persuade Mattie to stay behind.

One morning, while fetching water, Mattie encounters Chaney. She shoots him with her father's Colt Dragoon Revolver, wounding him and driving off his horse, but the shot draws the attention of Pepper and his gang. They take her hostage. To spare her life, Pepper orders Cogburn and La Boeuf to ride away. The gang moves on, leaving Chaney to guard her until they can replace his horse. La Boeuf, who has doubled back, warns Chaney to stand down while he and Mattie watch from afar as Cogburn engages the gang. Cogburn charges, killing two men and fatally wounding Pepper, while the last member flees. Pepper shoots Cogburn's horse, which collapses and pins him. As Pepper prepares to kill Cogburn, La Boeuf shoots him dead, but is knocked unconscious by Chaney, who attacks from behind with a rock.

Mattie fires at Chaney, but the Dragoon's recoil knocks her backward into a snake pit, where she breaks her arm and is bitten by a venomous rattlesnake. Cogburn arrives, kills Chaney, and descends into the pit to rescue her. La Boeuf helps pull them out before succumbing to his injuries. With no time to spare, Cogburn is forced to leave La Boeuf's body behind as he desperately rushes Mattie to a doctor.

Back in Fort Smith, Mattie's attorney, J. Noble Daggett, pays Cogburn his fee, and a bonus for saving her life, but warns that Mattie is gravely ill. Cogburn offers to wager the money on her full recovery, but Daggett declines. Later, Cogburn recovers La Boeuf's body and takes it to Texas for burial.

Some time afterward, he escorts the recovering Mattie back to her family ranch in Yell County, Arkansas. She tells him that, when the time comes, she wants him to be buried in the Ross family plot beside her, rather than in an unkempt, forgotten grave. Cogburn accepts, then rides off—leaping a fence to disprove her teasing remark that he is too old to jump a horse.

== Cast ==
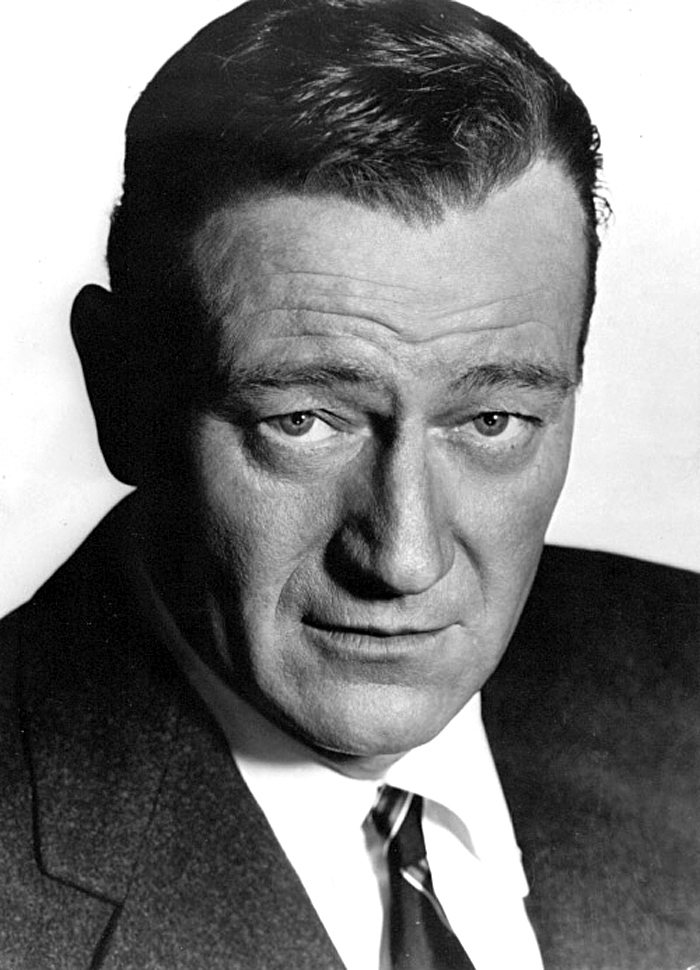
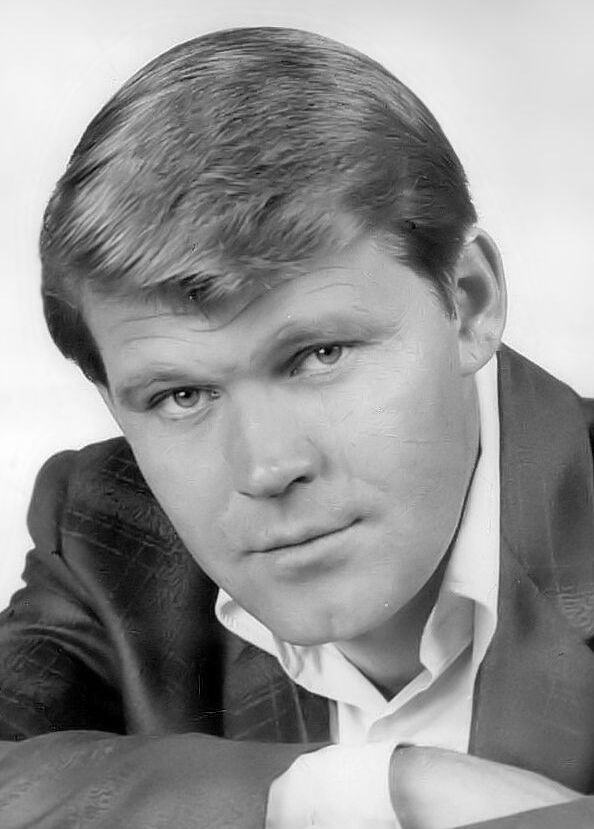
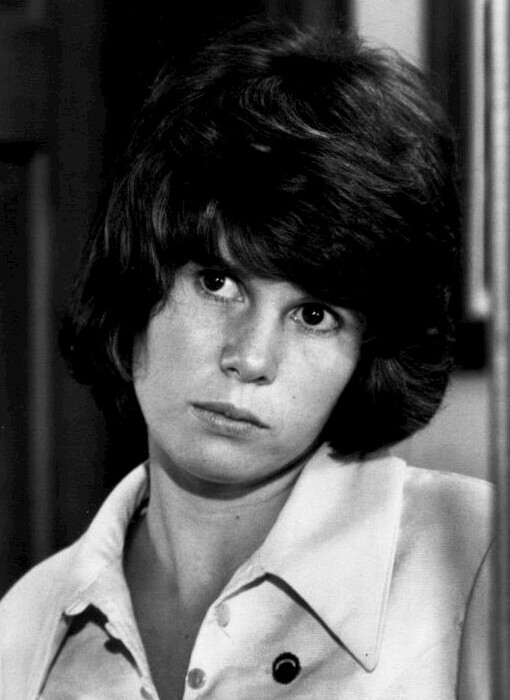
John Wayne (pictured in 1965), Glen Campbell (1967), and Kim Darby (1974)

Credits from the American Film Institute.

- James Westerfield as Judge Isaac C. Parker
- John Doucette as Sheriff
- Donald Woods as Barlow
- Edith Atwater as Mrs. Floyd
- Carlos Rivas as Mexican Bob
- Isabel Boniface as Mrs. Bagby
- H.W. Gim as Chen Lee
- John Pickard as Frank Ross
- Elizabeth Harrower as Mrs. Ross
- Ken Renard as Yarnell
- Hank Worden as R. Ryan, the undertaker at Fort Smith
- Jay Ripley as Harold Parmalee
- Kenneth Becker as Farrell Parmalee

== Production ==
=== Casting ===
Mia Farrow was originally cast as Mattie and was keen on the role. However, prior to filming, she made the film Secret Ceremony in England with Robert Mitchum, who advised her not to work with director Henry Hathaway because he was "cantankerous". Farrow asked producer Hal B. Wallis to replace Hathaway with Roman Polanski, who had directed Farrow in Rosemary's Baby, but Wallis refused. Farrow quit the film, which was then offered to Michele Carey, Sondra Locke and Tuesday Weld, but all three were under contract for another film. John Wayne met Karen Carpenter at a talent show he was hosting and recommended her for the part, though the producers decided against it because she had no acting experience. Wayne had also lobbied for his daughter Aissa to win the part. Olivia Hussey was also offered the role by Wallis, but the offer was rescinded after she said she "couldn't see herself with Wayne" and said that he "can't act." After also considering Sally Field, the role went to 21-year-old dancer-turned-actress Kim Darby.

Elvis Presley was the original choice for La Boeuf, but the producers turned him down when his agent demanded top billing over both Wayne and Darby. Glen Campbell was then cast instead. In multiple interviews, Campbell claimed that Wayne, along with his daughter, approached him backstage at his show, and asked him if he would like to be in a movie.

=== John Wayne's involvement ===
Wayne began lobbying for the part of Rooster Cogburn after reading the novel by Charles Portis. He called Marguerite Roberts' script "the best script he had ever read", and was instrumental in getting her script approved and credited to her name after Roberts had been blacklisted for alleged leftist affiliations years before. This came in spite of Wayne's own conservative ideals. He particularly liked the scene with Darby where Rooster tells Mattie about his life in Illinois (where he has a restaurant, his wife Nola leaves him because of his degenerate friends, and has a clumsy son named Horace), calling it "about the best scene I ever did". Garry Wills notes in his book, John Wayne's America: The Politics of Celebrity, that Wayne's performance as Rooster Cogburn bears close resemblance to the way Wallace Beery portrayed similar characters in the 1930s and 1940s, an inspired if surprising choice on Wayne's part. Wills comments that it is difficult for one actor to imitate another for the entire length of a movie and that the Beery mannerisms temporarily recede during the aforementioned scene in which Cogburn discusses his wife and child.

After reading True Grit by Charles Portis, Wayne was enthusiastic about playing the part of Rooster Cogburn, but as production got closer, Wayne got jumpy — he did not have a handle on how to play Rooster Cogburn. He was, of course, nervous because the part was out of his comfort zone and had not been specifically tailored to his screen character by one of his in-house screenwriters. Henry Hathaway, who directed the film, calmed Wayne's doubts, most notably concerning the eye patch which was made of gauze, allowing Wayne to see. John Wayne thought the picture had been edited too tightly by Hathaway. Nevertheless, in May 1969, a few weeks before the picture was released, Wayne wrote to Marguerite Roberts thanking her for her "magnificent" screenplay, especially for the beautiful ending in the cemetery that she had devised in Portis's style. Wayne and Kim Darby worked very well together, but Henry Hathaway disliked her, stating: "My problem with her was simple, she's not particularly attractive, so her book of tricks consisted mostly [of] being a little cute. All through the film, I had to stop her from acting funny, doing bits of business and so forth."

=== Filming ===
Hathaway says he decided to make the film like "a fairytale... a fantasy that I couched in as realistic terms as possible."

Filming took place mainly in Ouray County, Colorado, in the vicinity of Ridgway (now the home of the True Grit Cafe), around the town of Montrose (in Montrose County), and the town of Ouray. (The script maintains the novel's references to place names in Arkansas and Oklahoma, in dramatic contrast to the Colorado topography.) The courtroom scenes were filmed at Ouray County Courthouse in Ouray.

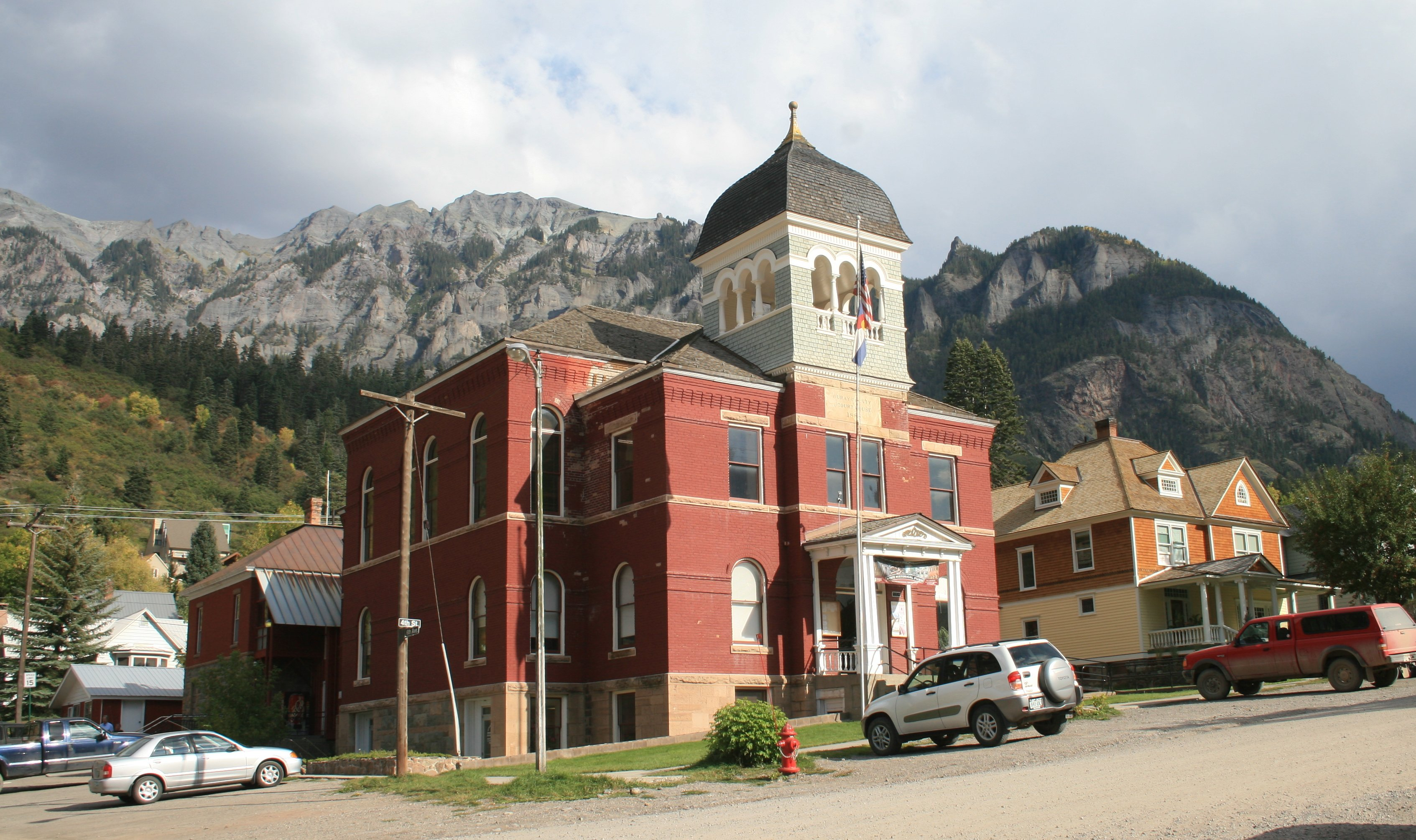
Ouray County Courthouse, constructed in 1888

The scenes that take place at the "dugout" and along the creek where Quincy and Moon are killed, as well as the scene where Rooster carries Mattie on her horse Little Blackie after the snakebite, were filmed at Hot Creek on the east side of the Sierra Nevada near the town of Mammoth Lakes, California. Mount Morrison and Laurel Mountain form the backdrop above the creek. This location was also used in North to Alaska. Filming was done from September to December 1968.

Veteran John Wayne stunt-double Tom Gosnell does the stunt in the meadow, where "Bo" goes down, on his longtime horse Twinkle Toes. In the last scene, Mattie gives Rooster her father's gun. She comments that he has gotten a tall horse, as she expected he would. He notes that his new horse can jump a four-rail fence. Then she admonishes him, "You're too old and fat to be jumping horses." Rooster responds with a smile, saying, "Well, come see a fat old man sometime," and jumps his new horse over a four-rail fence. Although many of Wayne's stunts over the years were done by Chuck Hayward and Chuck Roberson, it is Wayne on Twinkle Toes going over the fence. This stunt had been left to the last shot as Wayne wanted to do it himself and following his lung surgery in 1965, neither Hathaway nor Wayne was sure he could make the jump. Darby's stunts were done by Polly Burson.

The horse shown during the final scene of True Grit (before he jumps the fence on Twinkle Toes) was Dollor, a two-year-old (in 1969) chestnut Quarter Horse gelding. Dollor ('Ol Dollor) was Wayne's favorite horse for 10 years. Wayne fell in love with the horse, which carried him through several more Westerns, including his final movie, The Shootist. Wayne had Dollor written into the script of The Shootist because of his love for the horse; it was a condition for him working on the project. Wayne would not let anyone else ride the horse, the lone exception being Robert Wagner, who rode the horse in a segment of the Hart to Hart television show, after Wayne's death.

John Wayne as Rooster Cogburn

By the time the picture got back to the studio interiors, Kim Darby told Hal Wallis she would never work for Hathaway again. John Wayne was another matter. "He was wonderful to work with, he really was", said Darby. "When you work with someone who's a big star as he is ... there's an unspoken thing that they sort of set the environment for the working conditions on the set and the feeling on the set. And he creates an environment that is very safe to work in. He's very supportive of the people around him and the people he works with, very supportive. He's really a reflection, an honest reflection, of what he really is. I mean that's what you see on the screen. He's simple and direct, and I love that in his work." Surrounded by an angry director, a nervous actress, and the inexperienced Glen Campbell, Wayne took the reins between his teeth the same way Rooster Cogburn does in the climax of the film. "He was there on the set before anyone else and knew every line perfectly", said Kim Darby. Both Wayne and Hathaway had difficulties with Robert Duvall, with the director having constant shouting matches with his supporting actor, and Duvall and Wayne nearly coming to blows.

Hathaway says Campbell "was so damn lazy" and had troubles with Darby ("I had to stop her from acting funny".)

=== MPAA rating ===
The film was initially given an M rating (Note: Due to confusion over whether or not "M"-rated films were suitable for children, the M rating was renamed to GP in 1970 and then to PG in 1972.) when it was submitted to the Motion Picture Association of America's rating board. The filmmakers subsequently edited "four-letter words" out of some scenes to accommodate a G rating.

== Reception ==
=== Box office ===
The film premiered in Little Rock, Arkansas on June 12, 1969, and opened at the Chinese theatre in Los Angeles on June 13, 1969 where it grossed $38,000 in its first week. After 11 weeks, it reached number one at the US box office and returned to the top three weeks later.

The film earned an estimated $11.5 million in rentals at the United States and Canada box office during its first year of release.

=== Critical reception ===
On the review aggregator website Rotten Tomatoes, 88% of 56 critics' reviews are positive, with an average rating of 7.90/10. The website's consensus reads: "True Grit rides along on the strength of a lived-in late-period John Wayne performance, adding its own entertaining spin to the oft-adapted source material." John Simon wrote, "Worthy of succinct notice is True Grit', an amusing, unassuming western, antiheroic with a vengeance."

=== Awards and nominations ===
John Wayne won the Academy Award for Best Actor. Upon accepting his Oscar, Wayne said, "Wow! If I'd known that, I'd have put that patch on 35 years earlier."

Award	Category	Nominee(s)	Result
Academy Awards	Best Actor	John Wayne	Won
Academy Awards	Best Song – Original for the Picture	"True Grit"; Music by Elmer Bernstein; Lyrics by Don Black	Nominated
American Cinema Editors Awards	Best Edited Feature Film	Warren Low (tied with William H. Reynolds's edited film Hello, Dolly!).	Won
British Academy Film Awards	Most Promising Newcomer to Leading Film Roles	Kim Darby	Nominated
Golden Globe Awards	Best Actor in a Motion Picture – Drama	John Wayne	Won
Golden Globe Awards	Best Original Song – Motion Picture	"True Grit"; Music by Elmer Bernstein; Lyrics by Don Black	Nominated
Golden Globe Awards	Most Promising Newcomer – Male	Glen Campbell	Nominated
Laurel Awards	Top General Entertainment		Won
Laurel Awards	Top Action Performance	John Wayne	Won
Laurel Awards	Top Male New Face	Glen Campbell	Nominated
Laurel Awards	Top Female New Face	Kim Darby	Nominated
National Board of Review Awards	Top Ten Films		9th Place
Western Heritage Awards	Theatrical Motion Picture		Won
Writers Guild of America Awards	Best Drama – Adapted from Another Medium	Marguerite Roberts	Nominated

== Sequels and other film versions ==
A film sequel, Rooster Cogburn, was made in 1975, with Wayne reprising his role and Katharine Hepburn as an elderly spinster, Eula Goodnight, who teams with him. The plot has been described as a rehash of the original True Grit with elements of the Bogart–Hepburn film The African Queen. A further made-for-television sequel titled True Grit: A Further Adventure appeared in 1978, starring Warren Oates as Rooster Cogburn and Lisa Pelikan as Mattie Ross.

In 2010, Joel and Ethan Coen directed another adaptation of the novel. Their adaptation focuses more on Mattie's point of view, as in the novel, and is somewhat more faithful to its Oklahoma setting—though it was filmed in New Mexico. Hailee Steinfeld portrays Mattie Ross, Jeff Bridges plays Rooster Cogburn, and the cast includes Matt Damon as La Boeuf and Josh Brolin as Tom Chaney.

== See also ==
- John Wayne filmography
- True Grit (1969 soundtrack)
- "Win", song by Jay Rock
