= Chuck Hayward =

American actor (1920–1998)

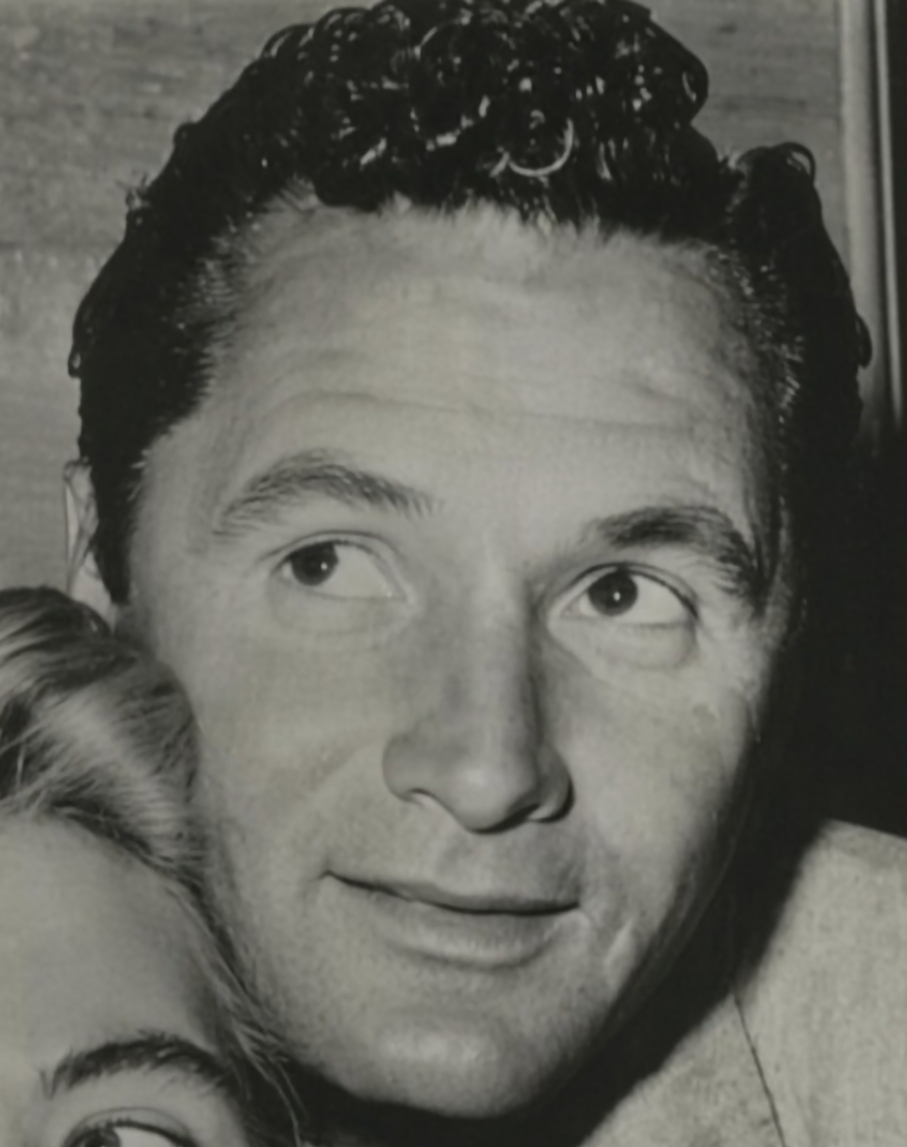
- Hayward in 1960
- Born: Charles Bert Hayward; January 20, 1920; Alliance, Nebraska, U.S.
- Died: February 23, 1998 (aged 78); North Hollywood, California, U.S.
- Occupations: Stuntman, actor
- Years active: 1949–1989
- Spouse(s): Ellen Powell (m. 1960–?) Carol Lynn Shepherd (m. 1973–1982) Sally Pape (m. 1982)
- Children: 1

Charles Bert Hayward (January 20, 1920 – February 23, 1998) was an American motion-picture stuntman and actor. He was associated particularly with the films of John Wayne. He doubled for most of the great Western and action stars of the 1950s-1980s.

== Life and career ==
His parents, Bert and Hazel Hayward, were cattle ranchers on a farm near Hyannis, Nebraska, about 60 miles east of Hayward's birthplace in Alliance. He spent his early youth working cattle, then, at 16, left home to join the rodeo circuit as a bronc rider and horse trainer. In 1947, he arrived in Los Angeles and sought work as a wrangler on motion pictures. He began doing stunts in 1949 on The Fighting Kentuckian, doubling for John Wayne. The two became pals and Hayward subsequently stunted and doubled for Wayne on nearly two dozen of the latter's films. Excelling at all sorts of horseback stunts, Hayward doubled most stars of the period who found themselves in Westerns or otherwise astride a horse, including Marlon Brando, Yul Brynner, Steve McQueen, and Gregory Peck. He was prominent in The Big Country (1958), co-produced by Peck. He was known as "Good Chuck" in contrast to "Bad Chuck", in reference to Chuck Roberson, another of Wayne's stunt doubles.

He graduated into stunt coordination, arranging the stunts in films such as The Deadly Companions (1961) and the TV series The Rat Patrol. He played small roles in numerous films and TV shows, and his appearance often served as an accurate predictor of an upcoming fight scene. He retired from stunt work in 1981, and from acting in 1989. Hayward was a member of the unofficial John Ford Stock Company, a lifetime member of the Stuntmen's Association of Motion Pictures, and an inductee into the Stuntmen's Hall of Fame. He died from Hodgkin's disease at his home in North Hollywood, California, in 1998. He was married three times, to Ellen Powell, by whom he had a daughter, and to Carol Lynn Shepherd. He had two children with Carol Lynn Shepherd. They were divorced in 1982. He then married Sally Pape Callaghan on October 30, 1982.

Before his Hollywood stuntman career, Hayward also worked as a medic in the United States Merchant Marine, and he stated that he served on Liberty ships. His two boys, along with his wife Carol's best friend, who was trying to save them, perished in a forest fire in the early 1980s.

== Filmography (actor) ==
- Wagon Master (1950) – Jackson (uncredited)
- Desperadoes of the West (1950) – Al (uncredited)
- High Noon (1952) – Townsman (uncredited)
- The Searchers (1956) – Man at Wedding (uncredited)
- Forty Guns (1957) – Charlie Savage
- The Big Country (1958) – Rafe Hannassey
- Escort West (1959) – Indian
- The Horse Soldiers (1959) – Union Captain
- Sergeant Rutledge (1960) – Capt. Dickinson (uncredited)
- The Alamo (1960) – Tennessean (uncredited)
- Spartacus (1960) – Soldier (uncredited)
- Two Rode Together (1961) – Trooper (uncredited)
- The Man Who Shot Liberty Valance (1962) – Henchman (uncredited)
- Merrill's Marauders (1962)
- Kings of the Sun (1963) – Indian Warrior Friend to Black Eagle (uncredited)
- Cheyenne Autumn (1964) – Trooper (uncredited)
- Nevada Smith (1966) – Minor Role (uncredited)
- The Rare Breed (1966) – Wrangler (uncredited)
- The War Wagon (1967) – Blacksmith (uncredited)
- 5 Card Stud (1968) – O'Hara (uncredited)
- True Grit (1969) – Hayes (uncredited)
- Rio Lobo (1970) – (uncredited)
- The American West of John Ford (1971) – Self; documentary (uncredited)
- Joe Kidd (1972) – Eljay
- Night of the Lepus (1972) – Jud
- Blazing Saddles (1974) – Outlaw #4 (uncredited)
- The Longest Yard (1974) – Trooper I
- Gone with the West (1975) – Mimmo's Men
- Rooster Cogburn (1975) – Jerry (uncredited)
- Hustle (1975) – Morgue Attendant
- Airport '77 (1977) – Passenger #3
- The Swarm (1978) – Standby Engineer
- The Lord of the Rings (1978)
- Parts: The Clonus Horror (1979) – Walker Man
- Tom Horn (1980) – Deputy Earl Proctor
- The Legend of the Lone Ranger (1981) – Wald (Cavendish gang)
- Crystal Gazing (1982) – Band Member
- Nightfall (1988) – Kin
- John Wayne Standing Tall (1989) – Self; documentary (uncredited)

== Filmography (stuntman, uncredited) ==
- She Wore a Yellow Ribbon (1949)
- The Fighting Kentuckian (1949)
- Wagon Master (1950)
- Rio Grande (1950)
- Tripoli (1950)
- Hondo (1953) – stunt double: John Wayne
- The Searchers (1956)
- Legend of the Lost (1957)
- The Wings of Eagles (1957)
- The Big Country (1958)
- The Horse Soldiers (1959)
- The Alamo (1960)
- Spartacus (1960)
- Sergeant Rutledge (1960)
- Johnny Ringo – TV series (1960)
- The Comancheros (1961)
- Two Rode Together (1961)
- How the West Was Won (1962)
- The Man Who Shot Liberty Valance (1962)
- McLintock! (1963)
- The Great Escape (1963)
- Cheyenne Autumn (1964)
- The Sons of Katie Elder (1965)
- Major Dundee (1965)
- The Rounders (1965)
- Return of the Seven (1966)
- Nevada Smith (1966)
- El Dorado (1966)
- The War Wagon (1967)
- 5 Card Stud (1968)
- True Grit (1969)
- Rio Lobo (1970)
- Chisum (1970)
- Big Jake (1971)
- Support Your Local Gunfighter (1971)
- Joe Kidd (1972)
- The Train Robbers (1973)
- Blazing Saddles (1974)
- Rooster Cogburn (1975)

== Television ==
- Wide Wide World episode – The Western (1958) – Himself
- Gunsmoke episode – Lynching Man (1958) – Jake
- Yancy Derringer episode – Gone But Not Forgotten (1959) – Mine Heavy (uncredited)
- Gunsmoke episode – Jayhawkers (1959) – Studer
- Maverick episode – Destination Devil's Flat (1960) – Guard
- Wagon Train episode – The Colter Craven Story (1960) – Quentin Cleatus
- Have Gun – Will Travel episode – A Head of Hair (1960) – Cheyup Tentez
- Bat Masterson episode – Blood on the Money (1960) – Fugitive in Plaid Shirt
- Johnny Ringo episode – The Stranger (1960) – Curly Ivers
- Wanted: Dead or Alive episode – The Choice (1960) – Bob Bradley
- Wanted: Dead or Alive episode – The Cure (1960) – A Rider
- Wanted: Dead or Alive season 3 episode 25 (Dead reckoning) (1961) : Burt Taggart
- Gunsmoke episode – Perce (1961) – Kemp
- Gunsmoke episode – Hammerhead (1964) – Cowhand
- The Rat Patrol 12 episodes (1966) – stunt coordinator
- Bonanza episode – New Man (1972) – Guard
- Kung Fu episode – The Well (1973) – Drifter (uncredited)
- Kung Fu episode – The Stone (1973) – Sheriff Jackson (uncredited)
- Little House on the Prairie episode – In the Big Inning (1975) – Cosby
- CHiPs episodes – Roller Disco: Parts 1 & 2 (1979) ... Limousine Driver
