= The Pack (Buffy the Vampire Slayer) =

- Buffy the Vampire Slayer episode
- Episode no.: Season 1 Episode 6
- Directed by: Bruce Seth Green
- Written by: Matt Kiene; Joe Reinkemeyer
- Production code: 4V06
- Original air date: April 7, 1997

Guest appearances
- Ken Lerner as Principal Bob Flutie; Eion Bailey as Kyle DuFours; Michael Mcraine as Rhonda Kelley; Brian Gross as Tor Hauer; Jennifer Sky as Heidi; Jeff Maynard as Lance; James Stephens as Dr. Weirick

Episode chronology
← Previous "Never Kill a Boy on the First Date"	Next → "Angel"
- Buffy the Vampire Slayer season 1

"The Pack" is the sixth episode of season 1 of the television series Buffy the Vampire Slayer. The episode aired on The WB on April 7, 1997. The episode was written by story editors Matt Kiene and Joe Reinkemeyer, and directed by Bruce Seth Green.

When Buffy and the rest of Sunnydale High endure the annual field trip to the zoo, Xander and some other kids sneak into the quarantined hyena exhibit, but leave in an altered state. It's up to Buffy, Giles and Willow to discover the cause behind Xander's bizarre behavior and reverse the transformation before it's too late. Meanwhile, Xander's new aggressive demeanor doesn't play well with his old friends.

== Plot ==
The students from Sunnydale High School are on a field trip to the Sunnydale Zoo. Buffy (Sarah Michelle Gellar) is confronted by a group of bullies who pick on her for being expelled from her previous school. The group then targets another student, Lance. When Principal Flutie (Ken Lerner) interrupts, Lance refuses to identify the bullies, prompting them to include him in their plan to explore the off-limits hyena exhibit.

Buffy sees them heading into the restricted area and tries to intervene, but Xander (Nicholas Brendon) volunteers to handle it himself, considering it unrelated to Slayer duties. As he leaves, Buffy and Willow (Alyson Hannigan) realize he might need help and attempt to follow, but are stopped by the zookeeper, Dr. Weirick (James Stephens), who informs them the hyenas are in quarantine after arriving from Africa. He also shares a local legend from the Maasai, claiming that hyenas are known to call people by name in order to isolate and devour them.

Inside the exhibit, the bullies attempt to throw Lance into the hyena enclosure, where a large hyena with glowing green eyes appears. Xander intervenes and pulls Lance to safety. The group — now including Xander — stands atop a large painted symbol on the ground. Lance flees as the others begin laughing ominously.

The next day at the Bronze, Willow eagerly awaits Xander. Buffy acknowledges Willow's crush and admits she finds Angel (David Boreanaz) attractive but feels she cannot pursue a relationship with someone who is rarely around and primarily focused on fighting vampires. When Xander arrives, he behaves strangely — taking Buffy's food without asking and sniffing her, noting that she has bathed. He also joins the bullies in laughing at a fellow student being mocked. They observe the bullies mocking a boy, and Xander laughs at their cruel joke.

At school, Principal Flutie chases a pig through the halls before Buffy catches it. He introduces the pig as Herbert, new school mascot. As Flutie discusses school spirit with Buffy, Xander walks past, and Herbert suddenly begins squealing in fear, prompting Buffy to take notice of the pig's reaction.

In gym class, Coach Herrold announces a game of dodgeball. Buffy and Willow are placed on the same team, while Xander joins the bullies. Xander and the bullies quickly eliminate all opponents, including Willow, whom Xander hits harshly with the ball. Near the end, Buffy is the last player remaining on her team, but instead of targeting her, the bullies throw balls at their teammate Lance.

Willow confronts Xander about his recent behavior. He admits his feelings for her have changed and says he will stop letting her tutor him to avoid seeing her "pasty face." Xander and the bullies laugh as Willow becomes upset and runs off. Buffy confronts Xander but is met with laughter. Later, during lunch, Xander and the bullies steal food from other students before entering the faculty room where Herbert is caged. Closing the blinds, Xander announces, "Let's do lunch."

Buffy consoles Willow about Xander's behavior. While Buffy suspects something is wrong with Xander, Willow believes the issue is with herself, noting that Xander is less rude to Buffy than to her. Buffy consults Giles, who dismisses the behavior as typical teenage male behavior. However, Buffy recalls the zookeeper's warnings and suspects Xander's change may be connected to their trip to the zoo. Giles agrees to investigate, and Willow arrives with the news that Herbert has been eaten.

Flutie confronts the four bullies, accusing them of being seen near Herbert's cage and threatens detention, ordering them to his office. Meanwhile, Giles suspects the involvement of the Primals, a sect that worships animals and believes they can attain a sacred state by transferring animal spirits into human hosts.

When Buffy visits the faculty room where Herbert was kept, Xander confronts her. Xander holds her down after a brief struggle, taunting her about her attraction to dangerous men like Angel. Buffy tries to reason with him, insisting that he is possessed. However, he dismisses her and pins her against a vending machine. Meanwhile, the other bullies corner Principal Flutie in his office and attack him.

Buffy drags an unconscious Xander back to the library and locks him in the book cage. Giles returns from a teachers' meeting and informs them that Principal Flutie has been eaten, though the official explanation is that wild dogs got into his office. Buffy and Giles visit Dr. Weirick to learn more about transpossession, leaving Willow to watch over Xander. When Xander regains consciousness, he attempts to talk his way out of the cage. As Willow approaches, he grabs at her through the book slot but misses.

Dr. Weirick informs Giles and Buffy that the hyenas were worshipped by the Primals. He instructs Buffy to gather all the possessed students at the zoo exhibit. They realize the remaining pack will target Xander, putting Willow in danger. The pack arrives at the library, calls out to Willow, and breaks in through the windows. After freeing Xander, they are driven off by Buffy. Outside, the pack attacks a family, but Buffy distracts them and leads them back to the zoo.

At the zoo exhibit, Giles confronts Dr. Weirick, who is dressed in tribal garb. Giles realizes that the zookeeper intended to become possessed by the hyena spirits himself, and that the students' possession was accidental. Weirick then knocks Giles unconscious. Willow arrives, unaware of the danger, and agrees to let Weirick tie her up and hold a knife to her throat, explaining that this "predatory act" is necessary to trigger the ritual and save the students.

As Buffy arrives with the pursuing pack, Weirick chants over a symbol, transferring the hyena spirits from the students into himself. He then attempts to attack Willow but is saved by Xander, while the other possessed students escape. Now fully possessed and violent, Weirick is knocked into the hyena pit by Buffy, where he is killed by the hyenas.

The next day at school, Xander is shocked when Buffy and Willow reveal that he ate a live pig during his possession, though he has no memory of it. When he asks if he did anything else embarrassing, Buffy dismisses the question. As Buffy and Willow leave, Giles informs Xander that none of his research on animal possession mentions memory loss, prompting Xander to beg him not to tell anyone.

== Themes ==
Theresa Basile, in a series about consent issues in Buffy, cites Buffy as telling Willow that Xander "tried his hand at felony sexual assault," but points out that "he does believe that she's attracted to dangerous men – that if he were dangerous and mean, she would be attracted to him"; and this is "before they find out that Angel is a vampire." However, "Buffy and Willow were 100% angst-free after they realized Xander was possessed, and considering that both girls were treating it as a joke and laughing about the possession after it was over, a sincere, serious apology on his behalf would have been completely out of place."

DVD Talk's Philip Duncan described the episode as "Another standard plot that's made more interesting by the school setting and the similarities to real life groups and pressure that are often found in school."

Reviewer Billie Doux, giving a rating of two out of four stakes, suggests a comparison with Lord of the Flies and calls Nicholas Brendon "seriously menacing." "What this series does really well is take an ordinary high school situation (bullies and gangs) and move it to a higher, more horrible, and more absurd level (hyena transpossession). ... But we all know that deep down, teenagers are scarier than vampires, don't we?"

== Cultural references ==
Buffy refers to the winged monkeys from the film The Wizard of Oz.

Rhonda compares a boy with the Goodyear Blimp.

Fluties lists movies with nudity on the TV network Showtime as one of the youth's problems.

Willow refers to the title of the sitcom Three's Company.

When Buffy implies Giles to be a skeptic, she references the character Dana Scully from The X-Files.

Buffy reads about the religious figure Noah and his ark.

In the library, Giles consults the Malleus Maleficarum, a historical text on witchcraft.

Buffy mentions the new-age keyboardist and composer Yanni.

Giles uses an illustration by Gustave Doré from The Divine Comedy.

== Broadcast and reception ==
"The Pack" was first broadcast on The WB on April 7, 1997. It earned a Nielsen rating of 2.4 on its original airing.

Vox ranked it at #73 on their "Every Episode Ranked From Worst to Best" list of all 144 episodes (to mark the 20th anniversary of the show), calling it "stupid, but in that early Buffy way where it all kinda works regardless... It's all dumb, metaphorical fun."

Noel Murray of The A.V. Club gave "The Pack" a grade of B, writing that "the storytelling in this episode is engaging and a few of the scenes genuinely creepy", though its central metaphor was not as developed as "Teacher's Pet". He felt that the episode was an example of how Sunnydale High did not feel like a believable high school, and criticized some of the action and the teenagers' hyena characteristics, but he praised Flutie's murder and Willow's development. A review from the BBC described it as "a highly inventive episode with an unusual premise, albeit one that is somewhat difficult to believe." The review praised Xander actor Nicholas Brendon, but felt that "the supernatural elements are clumsily handled" and called the ending "rushed and muddled."

Rolling Stone ranked "The Pack" at #59 on their "Every Episode Ranked From Worst to Best" list, calling it "unhinged," and referring to Xander and his pack as turning into "feral idiots" after they are possessed. "It’s a pretty heavy-handed metaphor about hormonal teenagers, but honestly, it plays out in such a silly, stupid way that it’s hard to not love this episode."

"The Pack" was ranked at #130 on Paste Magazine's "Every Episode Ranked" list and #120 on BuzzFeed's "Ranking Every Episode" list.
