= Galveston (album) =

Studio album by Glen Campbell
- Released: March 17, 1969
- Recorded: 1969
- Studio: Capitol (Hollywood)
- Genres: Country, pop
- Length: 28:07
- Label: Capitol
- Producer: Al De Lory

Glen Campbell chronology
Wichita Lineman (1968)	Galveston (1969)	True Grit (1969)

Professional ratings
Review scores
Source	Rating
Allmusic	4.5/5 stars

Galveston is the twelfth studio album by American country music singer-songwriter Glen Campbell, released on March 17, 1969, by Capitol Records. The album was a major hit for Campbell, reaching number one on the Billboard Country Albums chart, and generated the number one hit single on the Hot Country Singles and Easy Listening charts, "Galveston", written by Jimmy Webb, who also wrote the follow-up single, "Where's the Playground Susie", which peaked at number 28 on the Hot Country Singles chart and number 10 on the Easy Listening chart. The front cover is a photograph of Galveston Beach, Galveston, Texas.

== Critical response ==
In his review for Allmusic, Bruce Eder gave the album four and a half out of five stars, calling it "a smooth, lively, sentimental, and occasionally even exciting album." Eder concluded that the album "shows off the romantic, the virtuoso, and the country sides of Campbell's persona about as well as any album he ever cut."

== Track listing ==
Side 1

1. "Galveston" (Jimmy Webb) – 2:39
2. "Take My Hand for a While" (Buffy Sainte-Marie) – 2:41
3. "If This Is Love" (Glen Campbell, Bill Ezell) – 2:08
4. "Today" (Randy Sparks) – 2:29
5. "Gotta Have Tenderness" (Ramona Redd, Mitch Torok) – 2:09
6. "Friends" (Dick Bowman, Glen Campbell) – 2:31

Side 2

1. "Where's the Playground Susie" (Jimmy Webb) – 2:55
2. "Time" (Michael Merchant) – 2:42
3. "Until It's Time for You to Go" (Buffy Sainte-Marie) – 3:02
4. "Oh What a Woman" (Jerry Hubbard) – 2:39
5. "Every Time I Itch I Wind Up Scratchin' You" (Glen Campbell, Jeremy Slate) – 1:51

== Personnel ==
Music

- Glen Campbell – vocals, acoustic and electric guitars
- Hal Blaine – drums
- Al Casey – acoustic guitar
- Bob Felts – drums
- Dennis McCarthy – piano
- Joe Osborn – bass guitar
- Tony Terran – trumpet

Production

- Al De Lory – producer, arranger, conductor

== Charts ==
Album – Billboard (United States)

Chart	Entry date	Peak position	No. of weeks
Billboard Country Albums	04/05/1969	1(11)	26
Billboard 200	04/12/1969	2(1)	42

Singles – Billboard (United States)

Year	Single	Hot Country Singles	Hot 100	Easy Listening
1969	"Galveston"	1	4	1
1969	"Where's the Playground Susie?"	28	26	10
