= Generation (film) =

1969 film by George Schaefer

- Theatrical release poster
- Directed by: George Schaefer
- Screenplay by: William Goodhart
- Produced by: Frederick Brisson
- Starring: David Janssen; Kim Darby; Pete Duel; Carl Reiner; Andrew Prine; James Coco
- Cinematography: Lionel Lindon
- Edited by: James T. Heckert
- Music by: Dave Grusin
- Production company: AVCO Embassy Pictures
- Distributed by: AVCO Embassy Pictures
- Release date: December 15, 1969
- Running time: 109 minutes
- Country: United States
- Language: English

Generation is a 1969 American comedy film directed by George Schaefer and written by William Goodhart. The film stars David Janssen, Kim Darby, Pete Duel, Carl Reiner, Andrew Prine and James Coco. The film was released on December 15, 1969, by AVCO Embassy Pictures. It is based on the 1965 play of the same name.

== Plot ==
Nine months pregnant and due any day, Doris Bolton finally marries Walter Owen, a photographer who wants nothing to do with conformity or The Establishment. They want a natural childbirth, at home, with no doctors or drugs.

Her father, ad man Jim Bolton, flies to New York to be by her side. A liberal, Jim believes his daughter is risking her life and the baby's by defying convention. He asks obstetrician friend Stan to assist at the last minute, against Walter's wishes, but when the procedure results in success, Jim and his son-in-law reach an accord.

== Cast ==
- David Janssen as Jim Bolton
- Kim Darby as Doris Bolton Owen
- Pete Duel as Walter Owen
- Carl Reiner as Stan Herman
- Andrew Prine as Winn Garand
- James Coco as Mr. Blatto
- Sam Waterston as Desmond
- David Lewis as Arlington
- Don Beddoe as Gilbert
- Jack Somack as Airline policeman
- Lincoln Kilpatrick as Hey Hey
