= Norwood (novel) =

1966 novel by Charles Portis

- Author: Charles Portis
- Language: English
- Genre: Fiction
- Publisher: Simon & Schuster
- Publication date: 1966
- Publication place: United States
- Media type: Print
- Pages: 190
- ISBN: 0879517034
- OCLC: 1347348

Norwood is the first novel written by author Charles Portis. It was published in 1966 by Simon & Schuster. The book follows its namesake protagonist on a misadventurous road trip from his hometown of Ralph, Texas, to New York City and back. During the trip, Norwood is exposed to a comic array of personalities and lifestyles. The novel is a noteworthy example of Portis's particular skill rendering Southern dialect and conversation.

Norwood is included in the Library of America of Portis's Collected Works.

The novel was adapted for a 1970 film of the same title. Jack Haley, Jr. directed, and Glen Campbell and Kim Darby starred.

== Characters ==
Some characters and related events are described, below, using in-universe tone.

- Norwood Pratt, recently returned home on special discharge from the Marines. He is an employee of Nipper Independent Oil Company and Servicenter.
- Vernell Pratt, Norwood's sister, widely regarded as not quite fit to care for herself, hence Norwood's special discharge. At Norwood's arranging, employee of the New Ralph Hotel Coffee Shop.
- Joe William Reese, a Marine buddy, originally from Arkansas but living in New York. Owes Norwood $70.
- Bill Bird, an older, retired veteran (regular army). After a brief courtship at the New Ralph Hotel Coffee Shop, marries Vernell, moves into the Pratt home.
- Grady Fring (The Kredit King), a disbarred lawyer, shyster, and car hustler. Convinces Norwood to drive an Oldsmobile 98 (with a Pontiac Catalina in tow) to New York City.
- Yvonne Phillips, Norwood's unrequested passenger on the road trip to New York. Norwood and Yvonne part ways when Norwood abandons the cars and instead completes the trip by hitchhiking, trainhopping, and more-legitimately arranged train passage.
- Dave Heineman, an undermotivated freelance travel writer, New York resident, and one-time friend of Joe William.
- Rita Lee Chipman, estranged wife-to-be of a Marine named Wayne. She meets Norwood on his bus ride back to Ralph. The two take a romantic interest in each other.
- Edmund B. Ratner, "the world's smallest perfect fat man". He opens Norwood's eyes to certain of society's slights against midget culture. Expresses sympathy for Joann the Wonder Hen, The College Educated Chicken, liberated from her servitude by Norwood and company.

== Critical reception ==
Kirkus Reviews wrote that "Norwood is just simple enough to be believable and the story has just the right brand of humor." The New York Times called the book "delightfully original", writing that it "orchestrates some of the tinnier strains of today's America into a cool little fugue."
