= The Dog of the South =

Book by Charles Portis

- First edition (publ. Knopf)
- Author: Charles Portis
- Language: English
- Publication date: 1979

The Dog of the South is a 1979 novel by Charles Portis.

The Dog of the South is included in the Library of America of Portis' Collected Works.

== Plot summary ==
Ray Midge's wife, Norma, has run off with Guy Dupree, her ex-husband – in Ray's Ford Torino. From reading credit card receipts, Ray learns the couple are in Mexico. He packs up a Colt Cobra and goes after them, determined to get back his car.

Jack Wilkie, bail bondsman, is also after Dupree. Ray does not tell Jack about Mexico, because Ray wants to get his car back alone. Jack figures out this deception and follows Ray out of town. Ray is able to ditch Jack when Jack gets drunk in Laredo and again when Jack's car breaks down in Mexico.

In Laredo, Ray is inspired to ditch drunken Jack, when an old clown gives Ray a card that says, “Kwitcherbellyachin”. The receipts lead him to the Hotel Mogador in San Miguel. Norma and Dupree are not there. He figures they have gone to Dupree's farm in Belize.

In San Miguel, Ray meets Dr. Reo Symes, who needs a ride to Belize, after his bus - "Dog of the South" - breaks down. Dr. Symes' mother lives there, and Symes wishes to ask for the zoning rights to an island she owns. Ray and Symes travel together to Belize. They have an entertaining, if at times, fractious relationship - mostly due to Dr. Symes' eccentricities.

In Belize, Ray finds Dupree's farm with the help of a kid named Webster Spooner. Ray confronts Dupree, which mostly consists of harsh words from both sides. Norma is no longer with Dupree and Dupree has sold Ray's car. Ray finds his car scrapped in an auto-parts store, but he decides the trip was never about the car, anyway.

A hurricane hits Honduras. After the chaos, Ray is in a hospital, where he finally finds Norma. She is sick, and Ray nurses her back to health. The two return to Arkansas together. A few months later, Norma leaves again. This time, Ray does not go after her.

== Critical reception ==
The New York Times wrote that Portis's "people have dignity and determination and an abiding respect for each other's obsessions." Kirkus Reviews called the book "a funky, off-center book that never guns its motor and yet is always arriving at some place that's green and fresh and funny."

In a retrospective article, the Chicago Tribune called The Dog of the South "the most enjoyable Portis offering."
