= True Grit (1969 soundtrack) =

Soundtrack album by Glen Campbell and Elmer Bernstein
- Released: July 1969
- Recorded: 1969, RCA Recording Studios and United Recording Studios, Hollywood, CA
- Genre: Folk
- Label: Capitol
- Producer: Neely Plumb, Al De Lory

Glen Campbell chronology
Galveston (1969)	True Grit (1969)	Glen Campbell Live (1969)

Singles from True Grit (soundtrack)
- 1. "True Grit" Released: July 1969

True Grit is the thirteenth studio album and the first soundtrack album by Glen Campbell and Elmer Bernstein for the film True Grit starring John Wayne. Campbell performs on only two of the album's tracks, the first and last while the remaining eight tracks are taken from music composed by Bernstein for the film.

== History ==
The soundtrack entered Billboard's Album charts in August 1969, reaching a peak position of #77 and remaining on the chart for twelve weeks.

== Track listing ==
Side 1

1. "True Grit" (Don Black, Elmer Bernstein) – 2:32 (vocal – Glen Campbell)
2. "Rooster" (Elmer Bernstein) – 2:04
3. "Mattie and Little Blackie" (Elmer Bernstein) – 2:20
4. "A Dastardly Deed" (Elmer Bernstein) – 3:00
5. "Papa's Things" (Elmer Bernstein) – 2:58

Side 2

1. "True Grit" (Elmer Bernstein) – 2:58
2. "Chen Lee and The General" (Elmer Bernstein) – 2:55
3. "Big Trail" (Elmer Bernstein) – 3:15
4. "Cogburn Country" (Elmer Bernstein) – 2:02
5. "True Grit" (Don Black, Elmer Bernstein) – 2:00 (vocal – Glen Campbell)

== Personnel ==
- Glen Campbell – vocals (tracks 1 and 10), electric guitar (track 1)
- Jim Gordon – drums (track 1)
- Max Bennett – bass guitar (track 1)
- Gene Estes – percussion (track 1)
- Neil LeVang – acoustic Guitar (track 1)
- Dennis McCarthy – piano (track 1)

=== Production ===
- Producer – Neely Plumb
- Engineers – Jack Hunt, Don Henderson
- Soundtrack music by Elmer Bernstein
- Instrumental selections arranged by Artie Butler
- Glen Campbell's vocals produced, arranged and conducted by Al De Lory

== Charts ==
=== Album chart positions ===
Chart (1969)	Peak position
U.S. Billboard 200	77

=== Single chart positions ===
Song	Peak chart position		
Song	US	US Country	US Easy Listening
"True Grit"	35	9	7
