= True Grit (novel) =

1968 novel by Charles Portis

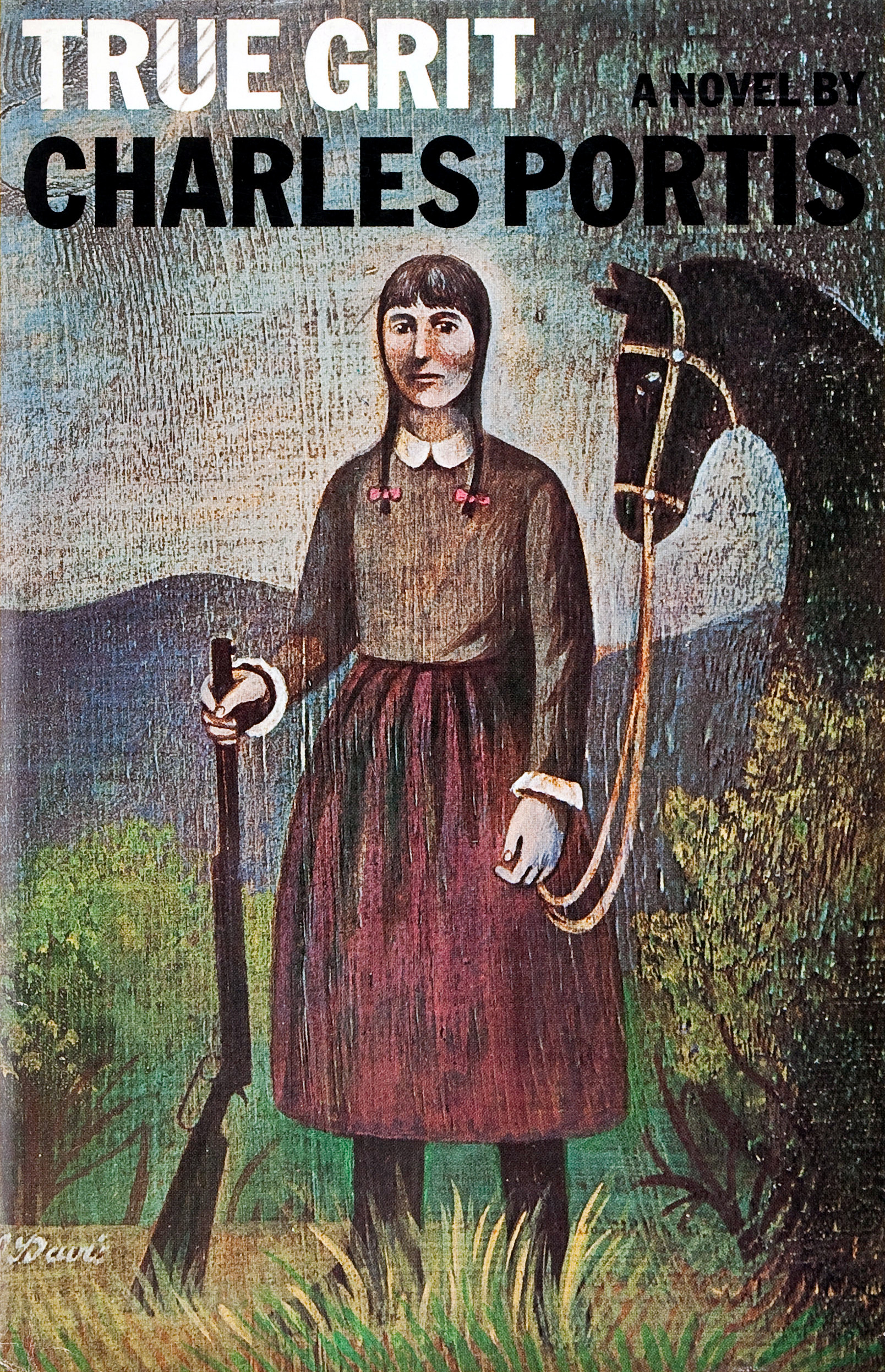
- Front cover of the 1968 Simon & Schuster hardback 1st edition of True Grit by Charles Portis.
- Author: Charles Portis
- Language: English
- Genre: Western
- Publisher: Simon & Schuster
- Publication date: 1968
- Publication place: United States
- Media type: Print (hardback & paperback)
- Pages: 215

True Grit is a 1968 novel by Charles Portis that was first published as a 1968 serial within The Saturday Evening Post. The novel is told from the perspective of an elderly spinster named Mattie Ross, who recounts the time a half century earlier when she was 14 and sought retribution for the murder of her father by a scoundrel, Tom Chaney. It is considered by some critics to be "one of the great American novels". True Grit is included in the Library of America of Portis' Collected Works.

The novel was adapted for the screenplay of the 1969 film True Grit starring John Wayne, Kim Darby and Glen Campbell. Six years later, in 1975, Wayne reprised his Academy Award-winning role as the tough hard drinking one-eyed lawman in the sequel film Rooster Cogburn. In 2010, Joel and Ethan Coen wrote and directed another film adaptation of True Grit. In November 2010, The Overlook Press published a movie tie-in edition of the second film version of True Grit.

== Plot summary ==
The novel is narrated by Mattie Ross, an elderly spinster, devout Democrat and Presbyterian and owner of a small bank. On the eve of the Great Depression, she recounts the story of her adventures some fifty years earlier, in the late 1870s, when she undertook a quest to avenge her father's murder by a drifter named Tom Chaney. She is joined by Marshal Reuben J. "Rooster" Cogburn and a Texas Ranger named LaBoeuf (pronounced "La-beef"). Throughout the novel, Mattie interrupts her narrative to offer advice, opinions and comments to the reader, from contemporary political issues in the 1920s to theological arguments to anecdotes of her family life.

Chaney is employed on the Ross family farm near Dardanelle, a town in Yell County, Arkansas. He is not adept as a farmhand, and Mattie has only scorn for him, referring to him as "trash" and noting that her kind-hearted father, Frank, hired him only out of pity. One day, Frank Ross and Chaney go to Fort Smith to buy some breeding horses that the local livestock dealer, Colonel Stonehill, is selling at bargain prices. Ross has $250, along with two gold pieces that he has always carried, but he spends only $100 on the horses as they turn pit to be geldings. Later, Ross tries to intervene to prevent a drunken Chaney from starting a fight while armed with a rifle. Chaney kills him, robs the body of the remaining $150 and two gold pieces, and flees into Indian Territory (now Oklahoma) on his horse.

Upon arriving at Fort Smith with a neighbor named Yarnell Poindexter, Mattie finds the town busy attending a triple hanging. After witnessing the hanging, she arranges for her father's body to be returned home and vows not to rest "until that Louisiana cur was roasting and shrieking in hell."

Mattie is able to speak to the sheriff and learns that Chaney has joined an outlaw gang led by the infamous "Lucky" Ned Pepper. She asks the sheriff who is the best U.S. Marshal in the district and, rather than going with his recommendation, selects the one he describes as the meanest, pitiless and fearless. Named Reuben J. "Rooster" Cogburn, Mattie is convinced that he has "grit" and that his reputation for violence makes him best suited for the job. Mattie also meets with Colonel Stonehill, who angers Mattie with disparaging comments about Arkansas. She manages, with the threat of a costly lawsuit brought by family friend and lawyer J. Noble Daggett, to get the initially uncompromising Stonehill to agree to buy back the horses and also pay for the stolen horse to the tune of $325. Stonehill agrees to "remit the extortion money" when he has secured a release from any lawsuit, signed by Mattie's mother and lawyer.

After watching Cogburn testify in a trial about an arrest in which he shot three men, Mattie approaches Cogburn and tries to hire him. Cogburn is ambivalent about being hired, but offers to let Mattie eat supper with him, after which he names his price at $100.

Mattie becomes sick and spends several days in bed at the boarding house. After she has recovered, LaBoeuf arrives to speak to her. He has been tracking Chaney for months for the murder of a Texas state senator and wants to return him to that state dead or alive to collect a reward. Mattie refuses to allow Chaney to be hanged in Texas, and an angry LaBouef leaves.

Mattie receives the release for the colonel from her lawyer and exchanges it with him for the money. She finds Cogburn and hires him with an initial payment of $25. She insists that she accompany him as part of the bargain, which he begrudgingly agrees to.

Returning to the marshal, Mattie finds him speaking to LaBoeuf. Cogburn and LaBoeuf take a dislike to each other, but after some haggling, they agree to join forces in the hunt, realizing that they can both benefit from each other's respective talents and knowledge. Once they reach a deal, the two men attempt to leave Mattie behind, but she proves more tenacious than they had expected. They repeatedly try to lose her, but she persists in following them and seeing her transaction with Marshal Cogburn through to the end. Eventually, she is jumped by Cogburn and LaBoeuf, who had hidden themselves from view, and LaBoeuf begins to whip Mattie with a switch. Mattie appeals to Cogburn, and he orders LaBoeuf to stop. At this point, Mattie is allowed to join their posse.

Together, but with very different motivations, the three ride into the wilderness to confront Ned Pepper's gang. Along the way, they develop an appreciation for one another.

== Film and television adaptations ==
In 1969, the book was adapted as a screenplay by Marguerite Roberts for the Western film True Grit directed by Henry Hathaway and starring Kim Darby as Mattie Ross, Robert Duvall as "Lucky" Ned Pepper, Glen Campbell as LaBoeuf, Jeff Corey as Tom Chaney, and John Wayne as Rooster Cogburn (a role that won John Wayne Best Actor at the Academy Awards).

A film sequel, Rooster Cogburn, was produced from an original screenplay in 1975, with John Wayne reprising his role, and Katharine Hepburn as an elderly spinster, Eula Goodnight, who teams with him. The sequel was not well received, and the plot was considered a needless reworking of the plot of True Grit combined with elements of The African Queen.

A made-for-television sequel aired in 1978 entitled True Grit: A Further Adventure and starring Warren Oates and Lisa Pelikan. The TV-movie featured more adventures of Rooster Cogburn and Mattie Ross.

In 2010, Joel and Ethan Coen released another film adaptation of the novel, also entitled True Grit, with thirteen-year-old actress Hailee Steinfeld as Mattie Ross, veteran actor Jeff Bridges playing Rooster Cogburn, Matt Damon as LaBoeuf, Barry Pepper as Lucky Ned, and Josh Brolin as Tom Chaney. Their version, focusing on Mattie's point of view, follows the novel more closely than the 1969 film. The Coen movie is shot in settings more typical of the novel. (The 1969 film was shot in the Colorado Rockies and the Sierra Nevada, while the 2010 film was shot in Santa Fe, New Mexico, as well as Granger and Austin, Texas.)

In November 2010, The Overlook Press published a movie tie-in edition of True Grit, featuring an afterword by Donna Tartt to accompany the 2010 film adaptation. It reached #1 on The New York Times Bestseller List on January 30, 2011.
