= Rooster Cogburn (character) =

Fictional character

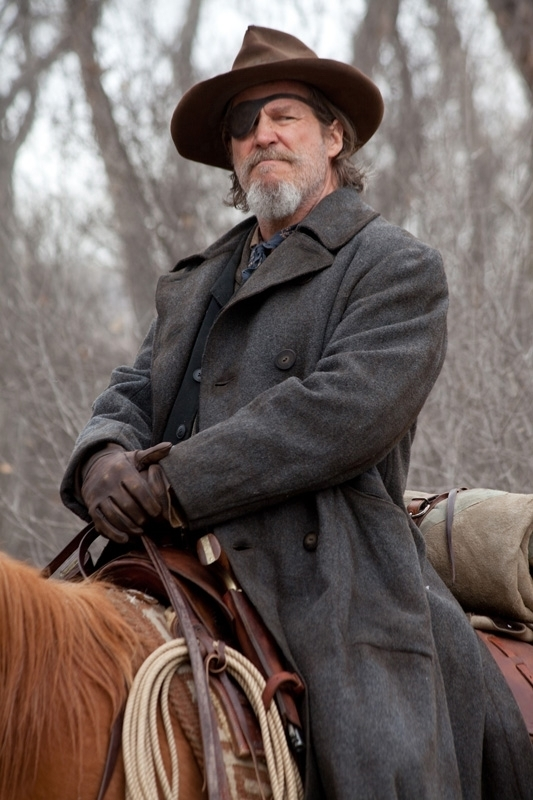
- Jeff Bridges as Rooster Cogburn in True Grit
- First appearance: True Grit (novel)
- Last appearance: True Grit (2010 film)
- Created by: Charles Portis
- Portrayed by: John Wayne; Warren Oates; Jeff Bridges

In-universe information
- Occupation: U.S. Marshal; Wild West Show participant
- Nationality: American

Reuben J. "Rooster" Cogburn is a fictional character introduced in the 1968 Charles Portis novel True Grit.

== Biography ==
Reuben Cogburn is a veteran of the American Civil War who served under Confederate guerrilla leader William Quantrill and lost one eye. By 1878, the year of the novel, he is a 39-year-old United States Marshal who hunts fugitives for Judge Isaac C. Parker's court. He lives a meager existence of drinking, gambling and sleeping in the back of a grocery store, but is ruthless in his pursuit of fugitives. His grit persuades teenager Mattie Ross to hire him to catch Tom Chaney, the outlaw who killed her father. Although initially dismissive of Mattie, he grows to respect her courage as she travels with him through danger-fraught Indian Territory. Mattie likewise grows to admire Cogburn's flawed heroism, and years later accepts him for burial in her family cemetery.

== Portrayals ==
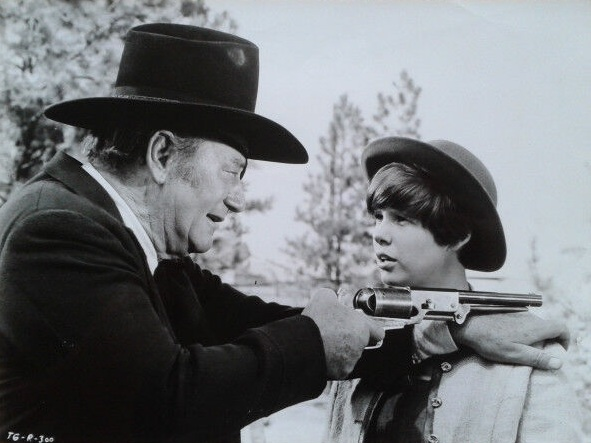
John Wayne with Kim Darby in the original 1969 True Grit adaptation.

John Wayne played Cogburn in the 1969 adaptation of True Grit, which won him the Academy Award for Best Actor. He reprised the role in the 1975 sequel Rooster Cogburn. A 1978 made-for television sequel, True Grit: A Further Adventure featured Warren Oates in the role. Jeff Bridges played him in the novel's 2010 adaptation, for which he received an Academy nomination for Best Actor.

== See also ==
- List of Academy Award records
- Revisionist Western
