= Perfect Gentlemen (film) =

- VHS cover
- Genre: Comedy; Crime
- Written by: Nora Ephron
- Directed by: Jackie Cooper
- Starring: Lauren Bacall; Ruth Gordon; Sandy Dennis; Lisa Pelikan; Robert Alda
- Music by: Dominic Frontiere
- Country of origin: United States
- Original language: English

Production
- Executive producer: Bud Austin
- Producer: Jackie Cooper
- Production location: Claremont, California
- Cinematography: William K. Jurgensen
- Editor: Jerry Dronsky
- Running time: 100 minutes
- Production company: Paramount Television

Original release
- Network: CBS
- Release: March 14, 1978

Perfect Gentlemen is a 1978 American made-for-television comedy crime film starring Lauren Bacall (in her television film debut), Ruth Gordon, Sandy Dennis and Lisa Pelikan. The film, produced and directed by Jackie Cooper from a screenplay written by Nora Ephron, was filmed on location in Claremont, California and Hollywood, California from October 27, 1977, to November 1977. It originally premiered on March 14, 1978, on CBS.

== Plot ==
Three women with totally different backgrounds who share a common bond: each needs a large sum of money and each has a husband serving time at a maximum security prison. Lizzie Martin (Lauren Bacall) has been instructed by her husband Ed (Robert Alda) to deliver a $1 million bribe in order to get him an instant parole; however, when she learns he has been having an affair with his secretary, Lizzie wants to disappear but fears for her life if she doesn't carry out his instructions.

Sophie Rosenman (Sandy Dennis) needs money to save the family's bankrupt delicatessen; Annie Cavagnaro (Lisa Pelikan) needs money because she's pregnant, and Lizzie could use the funds to escape from Ed, so the three women devise an elaborate scheme to deliver the bribe money and then steal it back. Mrs. Cavagnaro (Ruth Gordon), Annie's mother-in-law, joins the trio when they discover they need her because of her safe-cracking expertise.

== Cast ==
- Lauren Bacall as Lizzie Martin
- Ruth Gordon as Mrs. Cavagnaro
- Sandy Dennis as Sophie Rosenman
- Lisa Pelikan as Annie Cavagnaro
- Robert Alda as Ed Martin
- Stephen Pearlman as Murray Rosenman
- Steve Allie Collura as Vinnie Cavagnaro
- Dick O'Neill as Mr. Appleton
