= Gringos (novel) =

1991 book by Charles Portis

- Author: Charles Portis
- Language: English
- Publisher: Simon & Schuster
- Publication date: 1991
- Publication place: United States
- Media type: Print (hardcover) (paperback)
- Pages: 269

Gringos is a 1991 book by Charles Portis and the author's fifth novel. It follows Jimmy Burns, an expatriate American, who during his adventures in Mexico encounters a female stalker, tomb-robbing archaeologists, UFO hunters, and a group of hippies.

== Reception ==
Kirkus Reviews wrote: "The double-talk of the cultists is expertly filtered through Portis's lean and muscular prose, and the plot's as tight as a blood-swollen tick. All in all, totally boss fiction." Robert Houston of The New York Times called it an "engine of pure delight" and wrote: "If Gringos stops to explore one slough too many from time to time, or to chase a folly farther afield than it really ought to, or to take one more elaborate stitch in the thin cloth of the plot than the fabric can stand, forgive it." Philip Herter of the St. Petersburg Times called it a "primitive book in the worst ways" and wrote that it offers "no thrills, no ideas and barely enough style to get you out of the gate."
