= True Grit (song) =

- Dutch release picture sleeve

Single by Glen Campbell

from the album True Grit
- B-side: "Hava Nagila"
- Released: July 1969
- Recorded: March 13, 1969; RCA Studio, Hollywood, California; March 18, 1969; Capitol Studios, Hollywood, California
- Genre: Country, pop
- Length: 2:32
- Label: Capitol
- Songwriters: Don Black; Elmer Bernstein
- Producers: Neely Plumb; Al DeLory

Glen Campbell singles chronology
"Where's the Playground Susie" (1969)	"True Grit" (1969)	"Try a Little Kindness" (1969)

"True Grit" is a song written by Don Black and Elmer Bernstein, and recorded by American country music artist Glen Campbell. It was released in July 1969 as the first single from his album True Grit. The song peaked at number 9 on the Billboard Hot Country Singles chart. It also reached number 1 on the RPM Country Tracks chart in Canada. The song also received an Oscar nomination for Best Original Song.

== Chart performance ==
Chart (1969)	Peak position
US Hot Country Songs (Billboard)	9
US Billboard Hot 100	35
U.S. Billboard Easy Listening	7
Canadian RPM Country Tracks	1
Canadian RPM Top Singles	23
Canadian RPM Adult Contemporary	4
Australia Kent Music Report	34
