= James Stephens (actor) =

American television and film actor (born 1951)

- Born: May 18, 1951 (age 75); Mount Kisco, New York, U.S.
- Occupation: Actor
- Years active: 1976-2015
- Known for: The Paper Chase; Father Dowling Mysteries
- Partner: Priscilla Taylor
- Children: 1

James Stephens (born May 18, 1951) is an American actor best known for his starring role as James T. Hart in the television series The Paper Chase. He is also known for his role in Tom Bosley's ABC television series, Father Dowling Mysteries (1989-1991), in which he was cast as Father Philip Prestwick.

== Biography ==
James Stephens was born in Mount Kisco, New York. He is best known for his role as idealistic Minnesota-born law student James T. Hart in The Paper Chase (1978–1979 and 1983–1986), taking on the role originated by Timothy Bottoms in the movie of the same name.

His first role was as C. L. Bradley in the pilot and two episodes of the ABC western series, How the West Was Won, starring James Arness. He guest-starred in such series as Buffy the Vampire Slayer, Diagnosis: Murder, L.A. Law, Matlock, Moonlighting, M*A*S*H, Eischied, multiple characters on Murder, She Wrote, a recurring role on Cagney & Lacey, and the role of the young Doctor Auschlander in 1945 in flashbacks on St. Elsewhere. His film appearances have included roles in True Grit: A Further Adventure (1978), First Monday in October (1981), The Getaway (1994), A Perry Mason Mystery:The Case of the Lethal Lifestyle (1994), and Against the Law (1997).

== Filmography ==
=== Film ===
Year	Title	Role	Notes
1981	First Monday in October	Mason Woods	
1983	Two of a Kind	Ron	Credited as James 'Stevens'
1989	Caddie Woodlawn	John Woodlawn	
1994	The Getaway	Harold Carvey, DVM	
1997	Against the Law	Det. Ben Hamada	
1998	Hijack	Harold Besser	

=== Television ===
Year	Title	Role	Notes
1978	How the West Was Won	C.L. Bradley	2 episodes
1978	True Grit: A Further Adventure	Joshua Sumner	Television film
1978–1986	The Paper Chase	James T. Hart	58 episodes
1979	Eischied	Colvin	2 episodes
1979	The Death of Ocean View Park	Phil Brady	Television film
1980	M*A*S*H	Private David Sheridan	Episode: "Morale Victory"
1980	Tourist	Steve Konay	Television film
1980	The Littlest Hobo	Kevin Wheeler	Episode: "Portrait of Danger"
1982	Mysterious Two	Tim Armstrong	Television film
1984–1994	Murder, She Wrote	Various roles	4 episodes
1986	St. Elsewhere	One episode as the young Daniel Auschlander	Episode: "Time Heals: Part 2"
1986	Gone to Texas	Stephen F. Austin	Television film
1987	Houston Knights	Jonathan Linder	Episode: "God's Will"
1987	Fatal Confession: A Father Dowling Mystery	Father Philip Prestwick	Television film
1988	21 Jump Street	Mark Rafferty	Episode: "I'm Okay, You Need Work"
1988	Hotel	Jonas Robinson	Episode: "Power Play"
1988	Cagney & Lacey	Lt. Jim Thornton	3 episodes
1988	Pancho Barnes	Rankin Barnes	Television film
1989	General Hospital	Aphrodite Captain	Episode dated 12 May 1989
1989	Moonlighting	Mark Charnock	Episode: "Lunar Eclipse"
1989–1991	Father Dowling Mysteries	Father Philip Prestwick	37 episodes
1990	Follow Your Heart	Howard	Television film
1993	Matlock	Dr. Duncan Farmington	Episode: "The Divorce"
1994	L.A. Law	Dr. Michael Joyce	Episode: "God Is My Co-Counsel"
1994	MacShayne: The Final Roll of the Dice	Patrick Blondel	Television film
1994	A Perry Mason Mystery: The Case of the Lethal Lifestyle	Daniel Kingman	Television film
1994–1998	Diagnosis: Murder	Ian Trainor / Dr. Niven	3 episodes
1997	Buffy the Vampire Slayer	Dr. Weirick	Episode: "The Pack"
1998	Beyond Belief: Fact or Fiction	Tom North	Episode: "The Gun"
2002	Courage the Cowardly Dog	Voice	13 episodes
