= Where's the Playground Susie =

- Single cover

Single by Glen Campbell

from the album Galveston
- B-side: "Arkansas"
- Released: April 28, 1969
- Recorded: November 26, 1968, and January 9, 1969
- Studio: Capitol (Hollywood)
- Genre: Country
- Length: 2:55
- Label: Capitol
- Songwriter: Jimmy Webb
- Producer: Al DeLory

Glen Campbell singles chronology
"Galveston" (1969)	"Where's the Playground Susie" (1969)	"True Grit" (1969)

"Where's the Playground Susie" is a song written by Jimmy Webb and recorded by American country music singer Glen Campbell. It was released in April 1969 as the second single from the album Galveston. The song peaked at number 26 on the Hot 100, number 28 on the U.S. Billboard Hot Country Singles chart, and number 8 on the Canadian RPM Top Singles chart.

== Other versions ==
A version by Andy Williams appeared on his album Happy Heart, which came out in 1969 a few weeks after Glen Campbell's single. Lynn Anderson covered the song (as "Where's the Playground, Bobby") on her 1969 album, At Home with Lynn. Everything but the Girl covered the song on the B-side of the 1986 single of "Don't Leave Me Behind". Bobbie Gentry also recorded the song (as "Where's the Playground, Johnny") on her 1969 album Touch 'Em with Love.

== Chart performance ==
Chart (1969)	Peak position
Australian Go-Set Chart	12
Canadian RPM Top Singles	8
Canadian RPM Adult Contemporary	3
New Zealand Singles Chart	9
US Hot Country Songs (Billboard)	28
US Billboard Hot 100	26
US Adult Contemporary (Billboard)	10
