= Jerry Lynn Young =

American criminal and bank robber

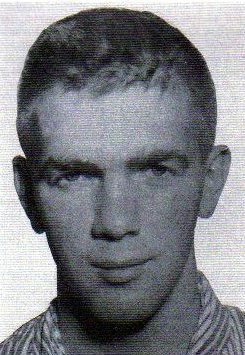

FBI Ten Most Wanted Fugitive

Description
- Born: October 1942
- Died: December 2015
- Gender: Male

Status
- Convictions: Armed bank robbery
- Caught: Jun 15, 1967
- Number: 248
- Captured

Jerry Lynn Young (October 1942 – December 2015) was an American criminal and bank robber, appearing on the FBI's Ten Most Wanted list in 1967.

Born in Alabama, Young joined the U.S. Marine Corps in February 1961; however, finding military training and discipline too difficult, he eventually received a dishonorable discharge in March 1962 following his conviction for robbing $4,359 from a bank in Richlands, North Carolina. He also suffered from psoriasis and needed frequent treatments.

Sentenced to six years' imprisonment, Young earned parole in August 1963, remaining on probation until March 1, 1967. The following day, armed with a shotgun, Young raided a bank in Asheville, North Carolina of $13,671 and, after shooting at a bank employee attempting to pursue Young, escaped in a stolen car.

Young and his accomplice William Webb robbed a Graysville, Alabama bank of $93,952 making it the largest bank robbery in the state at that time.

After being identified by photographs in a bank robbery in Olive Branch, Mississippi of $14,919 on April 14, Young was declared a federal fugitive and officially added as the 248th fugitive to the FBI's Ten Most Wanted list on May 12, 1967.

After only a month on the run, Young was arrested with accomplice Webb by FBI agents as they left their motel room in Akron, Ohio on June 15. Despite Young's boast that he "would never be taken alive", Young peacefully surrendered to federal agents and was eventually convicted on a number of federal charges before returning to prison.
