= Rooster Cogburn (film) =

1975 film

- Theatrical release poster
- Directed by: Stuart Millar
- Written by: Martha Hyer (credited as Martin Julien)
- Based on: Rooster Cogburn by Charles Portis
- Produced by: Hal B. Wallis
- Starring: John Wayne; Katharine Hepburn; Richard Jordan; Anthony Zerbe; John McIntire; Paul Koslo; Richard Romancito; Tommy Lee; Strother Martin
- Cinematography: Harry Stradling, Jr.
- Edited by: Robert Swink
- Music by: Laurence Rosenthal
- Color process: Technicolor
- Production company: Hal Wallis Productions
- Distributed by: Universal Pictures
- Release date: 1975
- Running time: 108 minutes
- Country: United States
- Language: English
- Budget: $10 million
- Box office: $17.6 million

Rooster Cogburn, also known as Rooster Cogburn (...and the Lady), is a 1975 American Western film directed by Stuart Millar, and starring John Wayne and Katharine Hepburn. Written by Martha Hyer (who is credited as Martin Julien) and based on the Rooster Cogburn character from Charles Portis' 1968 Western novel True Grit, the film is a sequel to True Grit (1969), and the second installment overall in the film series of the same name. The plot details the continuing adventures of Deputy U.S. Marshal Reuben J. "Rooster" Cogburn, an aging one-eyed lawman, whose badge is suspended due to his record of routine arrests that end in bloodshed. He is offered a chance to redeem himself by bringing in a group of bank robbers who have hijacked a wagon shipment of nitroglycerin and finds himself aided in his quest by a spinster whose father was killed by the criminals.

== Plot ==
In Fort Smith, Arkansas, in the late 19th century, aging one-eyed Deputy U.S. Marshal Rooster Cogburn is stripped of his badge by U.S. District Court Federal Judge Isaac C. Parker due to his drunkenness and questionable use of firearms. When a shipment of highly explosive nitroglycerin is stolen from a transporting troop of United States Army Cavalry by the ruthless bank robber Hawk and his gang of nine outlaws and flees to Indian Territory, Cogburn is given a chance to redeem himself by Judge Parker. Alone, he enters the Indian Territory and tracks the fugitive bandits, who include Cogburn's former scout Breed, to the remote settlement of Fort Ruby which is now a Christian mission. He arrives at the village the day after Hawk's gang had overran it and killed the elderly Reverend George Goodnight as well as a number of the local Indians. The only surviving inhabitants that have not fled are the Reverend's spinster daughter, Miss Eula Goodnight, and one of her Native students; a teenage boy named Wolf whose family died in the attack. Cogburn tries to leave the pair at a nearby trading post, but they insist on coming with him to capture the bandits.

Because the nitro has to be transported slowly so it does not explode, Hawk travels ahead with Breed and an injured man to prepare for a bank robbery. Cogburn, Eula and Wolf overtake the rest of the gang and barricade the path through a gully with logs. When the bandits stop, Cogburn says he is the leader of a U.S. Marshal's Posse and threatens to blow up the nitro unless the fugitive bandits surrender for arrest. One outlaw sneaks away to flank Rooster and attempts to shoot Cogburn in the back. But, Eula, proving herself an excellent sharpshooter, kills the man from across the gully. Cogburn shoots another man while Eula and Wolf cause a distraction by firing into the air to make it appear as if they were a large posse. The bandits flee, leaving behind the wagon with the nitro, which also has a Gatling Gun on board. The bandits meet up with Hawk and take him back to the site of the ambush, where Breed determines that Cogburn lied about leading a large posse.

The gang sets out in pursuit of the nitro and catches up with Cogburn's party that night. They kidnap Wolf, who has fallen asleep on his guard watch, and offer to exchange him for the explosives. Wolf shoots the man holding him and makes it back to Cogburn and Eula. The trio is able to escape with the wagon after Cogburn has Wolf scatter the outlaws' horses.

Coming upon a river, Cogburn commandeers a raft from an old ferryboat man named Shanghai McCoy. He stashes the nitro and Gatling Gun on board and heads downstream, hoping to drop off Eula and Wolf somewhere safe before his final confrontation with Hawk. Breed and Luke, another one of Hawk's men, are tasked with trailing the raft while the other members of the gang wait at a strategic narrows. Luke suggests he and Breed double-cross Hawk by taking the raft themselves. But just as Luke is about to shoot Cogburn, Breed kills Luke, saying that, as Cogburn had once saved his life, they are now even. Breed warns Cogburn about Hawk's plan and then rejoins the gang. Hawk does not believe him when he says Luke was killed in a shootout with Cogburn and knocks Breed off a cliff to his death.

Cogburn is able to hold the remaining members of Hawk's gang at bay with the Gatling gun, but just past the narrows are some rapids. Cogburn, Eula and Wolf make it through safely, though the Gatling gun is lost. When they hear the gang's horses up ahead, the trio dumps several boxes of nitro overboard to float ahead of the raft. Eula and Wolf delay Hawk by saying Cogburn is injured and pretending to surrender as Cogburn shoots the floating boxes, blowing up the last four bandits.

Back in Fort Smith, Eula convinces Federal Judge Isaac C. Parker to reinstate Cogburn as a Deputy U.S. Marshal, even though he had stipulated fugitive Hawks be brought back alive. She and Wolf find some families to resettle Fort Ruby and part ways with Cogburn. The new friends hope their paths cross again someday.

== Cast ==
- John Wayne as Deputy U.S. Marshal Reuben J. "Rooster" Cogburn
- Katharine Hepburn as Miss Eula Goodnight
- Anthony Zerbe as Breed
- Richard Jordan as Hawk
- John McIntire as U.S. District Court Federal Judge Isaac C. Parker
- Richard Romancito as Wolf
- Paul Koslo as Luke
- Jack Colvin as Red
- Jon Lormer as Reverend George Goodnight
- Lane Smith as Leroy
- Tommy Lee as Chen Lee
- Warren Vanders as Bagby
- Strother Martin as Shanghai McCoy
- Jerry Gatlin as Nose

== Production ==
Rooster Cogburn, which was promoted as Rooster Cogburn (...and the Lady) (the opening credits feature the simpler title), was the final film produced by Hal B. Wallis. While True Grit had been released by Paramount Pictures, Wallis made a deal with Universal Pictures to finance this film. The screenplay was written by actress Martha Hyer, who was Wallis' wife at the time, under the pen name Martin Julien. Although Stuart Millar was a longtime Hollywood producer, he had directed only one film, When the Legends Die (1972) (based on the 1963 novel of the same name by Hal Borland), prior to helming Rooster Cogburn.

The film was shot in Oregon in autumn 1974. The mountain scenes were filmed in Deschutes County west of Bend, the whitewater rapids were filmed on the Deschutes River, and the river scenes were filmed on the Rogue River in the counties of Josephine and Curry, west of Grants Pass. A cabin used during the filming of Rooster Cogburn was also preserved after production. Known as the Old Stearns Cabin, the structure was used as a filming location during the production and was purchased in 1976. It was subsequently relocated to the grounds of the Riverhouse Lodge in Bend, Oregon, where it was preserved at the resort for many years. Smith Rock State Park, northeast of Redmond in Deschutes County, was also used as a location for the film, and the Rockhard/Smith Rock Climbing Guides building at the park's entrance was originally built as the set for Kate's Saloon.

John Wayne and Katharine Hepburn were both born in May 1907 (Hepburn the elder by two weeks), and their careers paralleled each other, yet this marked the only time the Hollywood veterans appeared together in a film. During filming, both 67-year-old stars stayed in Sunriver, and Governor Tom McCall flew in for a brief visit with them in early October.

Noted character actor Strother Martin portrays Shanghai McCoy in the film; he had appeared in True Grit as a different character (horse trader Colonel G. Stonehill).

== Reception ==
=== Critical response ===
In his review in The New York Times, Vincent Canby called the film "a high-class example of the low Hollywood art of recycling" and praised the performances by the two leads—Wayne for his continuation of his Oscar-winning role as Cogburn, and Hepburn for a performance that recalls her "marvelous characterization opposite Humphrey Bogart in The African Queen". Canby concluded that the film is "a cheerful, throwaway Western, featuring two stars of the grand tradition who respond to each other with verve that makes the years disappear."

Roger Ebert gave the film one star out of four, and wrote: "the chemistry's there at times. But when it does work, it's largely because of the sheer acting craft of [Wayne and Hepburn]. The dialog they're given is so consciously arch, so filled with subtle little recognitions of who the two actors are, that we never care about the story and it never gets told. And without a narrative to help us along, we finally have to wonder why the movie was made."

Gene Siskel of the Chicago Tribune gave the film two out of four stars and wrote: "It's a stupid story riddled with plot-holes. All that it cares about is providing Hepburn and Wayne with a half-dozen 'big scenes' together ... What few pleasures are contained in 'Rooster Cogburn' occur when Hepburn and Wayne simply and silently look at each other with affection. We sense they like each other from the beginning, so their put-down material comes across as phony theatricality."

Arthur D. Murphy of Variety wrote that the film had "an embarrassingly prefab script, along with much forced and strident acting, all badly coordinated by the numb and ragged direction of Stuart Miller."

Charles Champlin of the Los Angeles Times called the film a "slow and rattletrap" star vehicle for Wayne and Hepburn, whose pairing was "not so much a relationship as a very good-natured contest in scene larceny. Despite some of the most tongue-numbing dialogue in a long while, Hepburn wins every time with her sweetly devastating underplaying."

Gary Arnold of The Washington Post called it "a patchwork conception that might have worked if the script had been considerably more ingenious and the direction considerably more adroit ... Screenwriter Martin Julien hasn't discovered how to develop a relationship between hero and heroine that runs on the same track with the chase story, and Stuart Millar's direction is as heavy as lead and slow as molasses."

On Rotten Tomatoes, the film holds a 50% approval rating based on reviews from twelve critics, with an average rating of 4.80 out of 10.

=== Box office ===
The film was a disappointment being far less popular than True Grit, grossing an estimated $17 million at the box office, earning $4.5 million in theatrical rentals in the United States and Canada.

== See also ==
- List of American films of 1975
- John Wayne filmography
- Katharine Hepburn filmography
