= Charles Portis =

American author (1933–2020)

- Born: Charles McColl Portis; December 28, 1933; El Dorado, Arkansas, U.S.
- Died: February 17, 2020 (aged 86); Little Rock, Arkansas, U.S.
- Occupation: Writer
- Writing career
- Period: 1966–1991
- Genres: Western; Satire
- Notable works: True Grit; Norwood

Charles McColl Portis (December 28, 1933 – February 17, 2020) was an American author best known for his novels Norwood (1966) and the classic Western True Grit (1968). Both Norwood and True Grit were adapted as films, released in 1970 and 1969, respectively. True Grit also inspired a film sequel and a made-for-TV movie sequel. The second film adaptation of True Grit was released in 2010.

In 2023, the Library of America published his Collected Works. In the introduction, editor Jay Jennings observes: "Charles Portis is now recognized as a singular American genius, a writer whose deadpan style, picaresque plots, and unforgettable characters have drawn a passionate following among readers and writers."

Portis has been described as "one of the most inventively comic writers of western fiction".

== Early life ==
Charles Portis was born in 1933 in El Dorado, Arkansas, the son of Alice (Waddell) and Samuel Palmer Portis. He was raised and educated in various towns in southern Arkansas, including Hamburg and Mount Holly.

During the Korean War, Portis enlisted in the U.S. Marine Corps and reached the rank of sergeant. After receiving his discharge in 1955, he enrolled in the University of Arkansas at Fayetteville. He graduated with a degree in journalism in 1958.

== Career ==
Portis began writing in college, for both the University of Arkansas at Fayetteville student newspaper, Arkansas Traveler, and the Northwest Arkansas Times. One of his tasks was to redact the colorful reporting of "lady stringers" in the Ozarks, a task credited as a source for the vivid voice that he created years later for his character Mattie Ross in True Grit. After Portis graduated, he worked for various newspapers as a reporter, including the Memphis Commercial Appeal and almost two years at the Arkansas Gazette, for which he wrote the "Our Town" column.

He then moved to New York City, where he worked for four years at the New York Herald Tribune. Here he briefly dated Nora Ephron. His work led him to return to the South frequently to cover civil rights stories during the early 1960s. After serving as the London bureau chief of the New York Herald Tribune, he left journalism in 1964.

Portis next returned to Arkansas and began writing fiction full-time. In his first novel, Norwood (1966), he showed his preference for travel narratives with deadpan dialogue, combined with amusing observations on American culture. Set sometime from 1959 through 1961, the novel revolves around Norwood Pratt, a young, naïve ex-Marine living in Ralph, Texas. He is persuaded by con man Grady Fring (the first of several such characters created by Portis) to transport two automobiles to New York City. Norwood encounters a variety of people on the way to New York and back, including ex-circus midget Edmund Ratner ("the world’s smallest perfect fat man"), Joann ("the college-educated chicken"), and Rita Lee, a girl Norwood woos and wins on the bus ride back to the South.

Like Norwood, his novel True Grit (1968) was first serialized in condensed form in The Saturday Evening Post. The story is told in first person from the perspective of Yell County native Mattie Ross. At the time of the novel's events, she is a prim, shrewd, strong-willed, Bible-quoting 14-year-old girl. When her father is murdered in Fort Smith, Arkansas, by Tom Chaney, a hired hand, she sets out to bring the killer to justice. She recruits Deputy Marshal Rooster Cogburn — in whom Mattie sees one possessed of "grit" — to help her hunt down Chaney (who has joined an outlaw band) to "avenge her father’s blood".

Both Norwood and True Grit were adapted as movies, with fellow Arkansan Glen Campbell and Kim Darby in leading roles in the two films. Both pictures were commercially successful. John Wayne won an Academy Award and a Golden Globe for Best Actor for his performance as Rooster Cogburn in True Grit, one of the top box-office hits of 1969. True Grit was released on June 11, 1969, earning US$14.25 million at the box office. A second film version, written and directed by Joel and Ethan Coen and starring Jeff Bridges and Hailee Steinfeld debuted in December 2010.

Portis published several short pieces in The Atlantic Monthly, including the memoir "Combinations of Jacksons" and the story "I Don't Talk Service No More".

His final published work was the collection Escape Velocity: A Charles Portis Miscellany, including journalism and other non-fiction, short stories, and a single play, Delray's New Moon. Subjects include the civil rights movement, a road trip in Baja, and Elvis Presley's visit to his aging mother. Some of the works originally appeared in such publications as the New York Herald Tribune and The Saturday Evening Post. The New York Times' book reviewer Carlo Rotella said, "You can enjoy Escape Velocity as a stand-alone collection, but a Portis miscellany will always be read too as a key to the experiences and craft lessons that shaped the novels."

Writing of Portis, Aaron Gilbreath has observed that his literary obscurity might, like him, remain forever hidden, because "he won't surface long enough to let reporters ask him about it."

However, in 2023, the Library of America published his Collected Works.

== Personal life and death ==
Portis lived in Little Rock, Arkansas, where he died of Alzheimer's disease on February 17, 2020, at the age of 86.

== Works ==
Novels

- 1966: Norwood
- 1968: True Grit
- 1979: The Dog of the South
- 1985: Masters of Atlantis
- 1991: Gringos

Nonfiction

- 2012: Escape Velocity: A Charles Portis Miscellany

Short fiction, articles, etc.

- "The New Sound from Nashville," The Saturday Evening Post, 239 (12 February 1966): 30–38.
- "Traveling Light," The Saturday Evening Post, 239 (18 June 1966): 54–77; 239 (2 July 1966): 48–75. (The revised, serialized version of Norwood).
- "True Grit," The Saturday Evening Post, 241 (18 May 1968): 68–85; 241 (1 June 1968): 46–61; 241 (15 June 1968): 44–57. (The condensed, serialized version of True Grit).
- "Your Action Line", The New Yorker Archive, 53 (12 December 1977): 42–43. Faulkner Wells, Dean, ed. The Great American Writers' Cookbook. Oxford: Yoknapatawpha Press (1981).
- "Nights Can Turn Cool in Viborra", The Atlantic Monthly, 270 (Dec. 1992): 101–106.
- "I Don't Talk Service No More." The Atlantic Monthly, May, 1996, Vol. 277, No. 5, pp. 90–92.
- "Combinations of Jacksons." The Atlantic Monthly, May, 1999, Vol. 283, No. 5, pp. 81–92. (A Memoir).
