= Kim Darby =

American actress (born 1947)

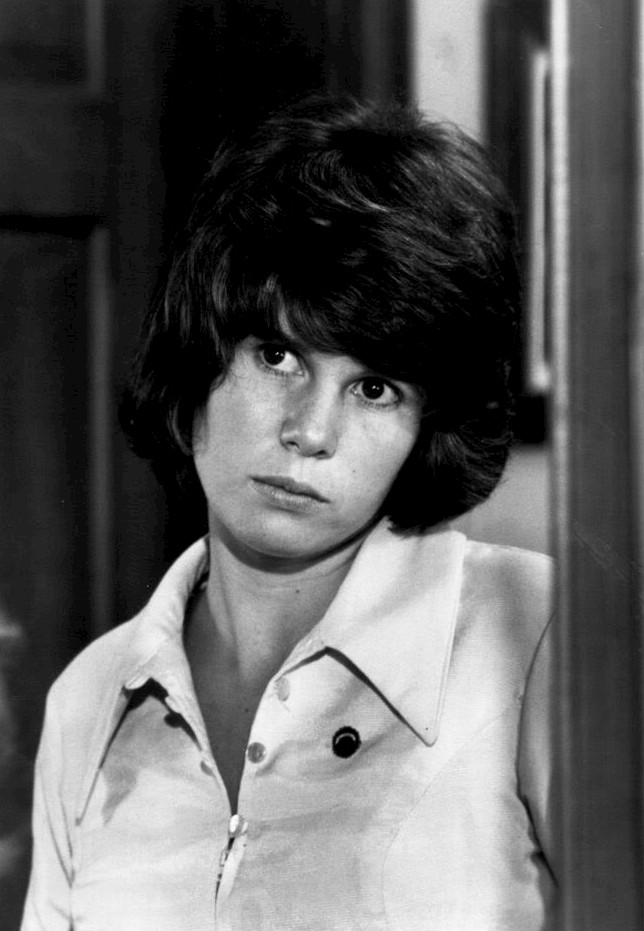
- Darby as a guest-star on Marcus Welby, M.D. and Owen Marshall, Counsellor at Law in 1974
- Born: Deborah Zerby; July 8, 1947 (age 79); Los Angeles, California, U.S.
- Occupation: Actress
- Years active: 1962–present
- Known for: True Grit; Rich Man, Poor Man; Better Off Dead; Generation; "Miri"
- Spouses: James Stacy (m. 1968; div. 1969); James Westmoreland (m. 1970; div. 1970)
- Children: 1

Kim Darby (born Deborah Zerby; July 8, 1947) is an American actress and teacher. Her breakout role was as Mattie Ross in the 1969 Western film True Grit, earning her a BAFTA Award nomination for Most Promising Newcomer to Leading Film Roles. The same year, she was nominated for a Golden Globe Award for Best Actress in a Motion Picture – Musical or Comedy for her performance in counterculture comedy Generation (1969).

Darby has appeared in over 80 films and television series. She was nominated for a Primetime Emmy Award for her role in the miniseries Rich Man, Poor Man. Between 1992 and 2009, she taught acting in the extension program at the University of California, Los Angeles.

== Early life ==
Darby was born Deborah Zerby on July 8, 1947 in Los Angeles, California, the daughter of professional dancers Inga (née Wiere) and Jon Zerby (known professionally as the "Dancing Zerbys" or "Dancing Zerbies"). Her father nicknamed her "Derby", saying "I thought Derby Zerby would be a great stage name". Her mother was a Hungarian immigrant from Budapest.

Darby was raised in North Hollywood and attended Van Nuys High School. She performed as a singer and dancer under the name "Derby Zerby". Believing that she could not "hope for serious important roles in films with a name like "Derby Zerby", she renamed herself "Kim", because it was the name of a popular girl in her high school whom she admired, and "Darby", as a variation of "Derby". While still a teenager, Darby studied acting under Tony Barr.

== Career ==
=== Film ===
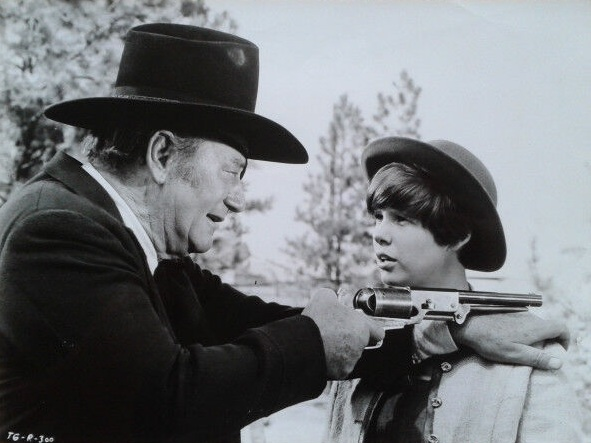
Darby and John Wayne in True Grit (1969)

Darby began acting at age 15; her first appearance was as a dancer in the feature film version of Bye Bye Birdie (1963), about a rock and roll music singing and guitar-playing star (modeled on the real-life career of Elvis Presley). Her television work included the Western TV series Gunsmoke of 1955–1975 (in the 1967 episodes "The Lure" and "Vengeance") and another long-running Western, Bonanza of 1959–1973 (in its 1967 episode "The Sure Thing"); and as a young girl approaching adulthood on an all-child planet in the 1966–67 first-season episode, "Miri", of the original Star Trek TV series of 1966–1969.

Among her many feature film roles, she is best known for her portrayal of Mattie Ross in the Western classic True Grit (1969), when she was 21 years old. Co-starring with John Wayne and Glen Campbell, she played a precocious, unusually confident 14-year-old Arkansas frontier girl pursuing the murderer who killed her beloved father. Set in the mid-1870s, the film was adapted from a popular Western novel published in 1968 by Charles Portis. It was hugely successful and reached number one at the box office in the US.

In 1970, Darby appeared in The Strawberry Statement and Norwood. She co-starred with Henry Winkler in The One and Only in 1978, and appeared in 1985's Better Off Dead, an absurdist comedy. A decade later, she played Laurie Strode's adoptive mother in the slasher film Halloween: The Curse of Michael Myers (1995), a sequel to Halloween (1978).

=== Television roles ===
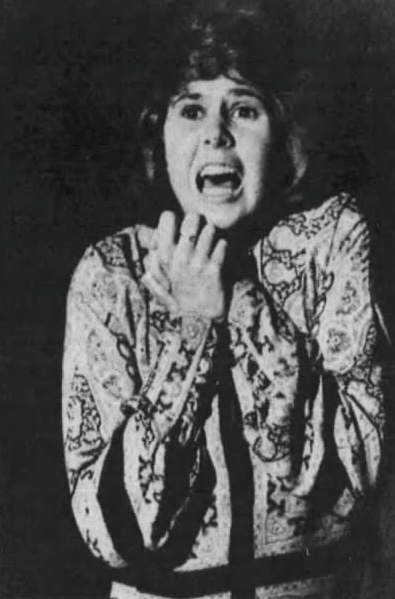
Darby in Don't Be Afraid of the Dark (1973)

Darby's 1960s television roles included two appearances on the NBC series Mr. Novak, starring James Franciscus, including an appearance as Julie Dean in "To Lodge and Dislodge" (1963). She was cast as Heather Heatherington in the Wagon Train episode "The Story of Hector Heatherington" (1964) and as Judy Wheeler in "The Silent Dissuaders" (1965).

Darby also appeared about this time on The Eleventh Hour, The Fugitive, The Donna Reed Show, Ironside, and in the first season of Star Trek as the title character in the episode "Miri."

Darby was cast in an episode of the NBC sitcom The John Forsythe Show ("'Tis Better Have Loved and Lost", 1965), and as Angel in the two-part Gunsmoke episode "Vengeance." She appeared in the episode "Faire Ladies of France" (1967) of the NBC western series The Road West starring Barry Sullivan and a Bonanza episode "A Sure Thing" (1967) as Trudy Loughlin, guest starring Tom Tully as Burt Loughlin, her father. She appeared in another episode of Gunsmoke, "The Lure" (1967) as Carrie Neely.

She was cast in the 1972 movie, The People, which reunited her with William Shatner from her Star Trek appearance. She played the unhinged Virginia Calderwood in the first television miniseries, Rich Man, Poor Man in 1976.

Darby had the central role of Sally Farnham in the made-for-TV chiller Don't Be Afraid of the Dark (1973). Some of her subsequent television roles included guest appearances on Crazy Like a Fox, Thriller, Family, The Love Boat, The Streets of San Francisco, Riptide, and Becker.

Darby admitted her career declined after the 1970s, partly due to her dependency on amphetamines at the time.

In 1990, she began to teach acting in the Los Angeles area and was an instructor in the extension program at the University of California, Los Angeles from 1992 to 2009. Darby also appeared in the 1999 The X-Files episode "Sein und Zeit" as a woman who confessed to the murder of her son, a boy who disappeared under circumstances similar to those being investigated by the lead characters, Fox Mulder and Dana Scully.

In 2014, she played Stacia Clairborne, a partially blind witness to a crime, in the episode "Prologue" of the show Perception.

== Personal life ==
Darby has been married three times, including to William Tennant. In 1968, she married James Stacy, with whom she had one daughter, Heather. Their marriage ended in divorce in 1969. In 1970, she married James Westmoreland; the marriage ended in divorce after less than two months. Both of her husbands named James died only 5 days apart, on September 9 and September 14, in 2016.

== Filmography ==
=== Film ===
Year	Title	Role	Notes	Ref.
1963	Bye Bye Birdie	Teenager	Uncredited	
1965	Bus Riley's Back in Town	Gussie		
1965	The Restless Ones	April		
1967	The Karate Killers	Sandy True		
1968	Flesh and Blood	Faye	Television film	
1969	Generation	Doris Bolton Owen		
1969	True Grit	Mattie Ross		
1970	The Strawberry Statement	Linda		
1970	Norwood	Rita Lee Chipman		
1971	A Glimpse of Tiger		Unfinished film	
1971	Red Sky at Morning			
1971	The Grissom Gang	Barbara Blandish		
1972	The People	Melodye Amerson	Television film	
1973	Don't Be Afraid of the Dark	Sally Farnham	Television film	
1974	The Story of Pretty Boy Floyd	Ruby Hardgrave	Television film	
1974	This Is the West That Was	Calamity Jane	Television film	
1978	The One and Only	Mary Crawford		
1979	Flatbed Annie & Sweetiepie: Lady Truckers	Sweetiepie	Television film	
1980	Enola Gay: The Men, the Mission, the Atomic Bomb	Lucy Tibbets	Television film	
1982	The Life and Times of Grizzly Adams	Kate Bradey	Television film	
1983	Summer Girl	Mary Shelburne	Television film	
1985	First Steps	Sherry Petrofsky	Television film	
1985	Embassy	Sue Davidson	Television film	
1985	Better Off Dead	Jenny Meyer		
1987	Teen Wolf Too	Professor Brooks		
1995	Halloween: The Curse of Michael Myers	Debra Strode		
1999	The Last Best Sunday	Mrs. Summers		
2000	Newsbreak	Frances Johnson		
2001|	Mockingbird Don't Sing	Louise Standon		
2004	You Are So Going to Hell!	Louise		
2007	Dead Letters	Barbs		
2017	The Evil Within	Mildy Torres		

=== Television ===
Year	Title	Role	Notes	Ref.
1965	Mr. Novak			
1964	Dr. Kildare	Patsy	Episode: "A Nickel's Worth of Prayer"	
1964	Wagon Train	Heather Heatherington	Episode: "The Story of Hector Heatherington"	
1966	Run for Your Life		Episode: "Hang Down Your Head and Laugh"	
1966	The Fugitive		Episodes: “An Apple A Day”; "Joshua's Kingdom"	
1966	Star Trek: The Original Series	Miri	Episode: "Miri"	
1967	The Man from U.N.C.L.E.	Sandy	Episode: "The Five Daughters Affair"	
1967	Ironside		Pilot for the NBC series of the same name	
1967	Bonanza		Episode: "The Sure Thing"	
1967	Gunsmoke	Carrie Neely	Episode: "The Lure"	
1967	Gunsmoke	Angel	Episodes: "Vengeance, Part 1" and "Vengeance, Part 2"	
1972	The Streets of San Francisco		Pilot for the TV series of the same name	
1973	Circle of Fear		Episode: "Dark Vengeance"	
1973	Love Story		Episode: "Joie"	
1974	Police Story		Episodes: "Captain Hook", "Wyatt Earp Syndrome"	
1975	Thriller	Helen	Episode: "Good Salary - Prospects - Free Coffin"	
1976	Rich Man, Poor Man	Virginia Calderwood	Miniseries	
1977	The Oregon Trail	Mary Anne Moorhead	Episode: "Return of the Baby"	
1978	Family	Lily Barker	Episode: "Princess in the Tower"	
1979	The Last Convertible		Miniseries	
1979	The Love Boat	Wendy	Episodes: "Alas, Poor Dwyer/After the War/Itsy Bitsy/Ticket to Ride/Disco Baby" (Parts 1 and 2)	
1982	The Love Boat	Sarah Curtis	Episode: "The Tomorrow Lady / Father, Dear Father / Still Life"	
1982	Fantasy Island		Episode: "The Challenge / A Genie Named Joe"	
1984	The Facts of Life	Doris Garrett	Episode: "Joint Custody"	
1984	Murder, She Wrote	Laurie	Episode: "We're Off to Kill the Wizard"	
1984	E/R	Mrs. Johnson	Episode: "Only a Nurse"	
1984	The Mississippi		Episode: "Abigail"	
1985	Scarecrow & Mrs. King		Episode: "Over the Limit"	
1986	Crazy Like a Fox	Jenny Fenwick	Episode: "A Fox at the Races"	
1986	Riptide	Nice Beverly	Episode: "A Matter of Policy"	
1995	Murder, She Wrote	'Wee' Joan Kemp	Episode: "Film Flam"	
1999	The X-Files		Episode: "Sein und Zeit"	
1999	Becker		Episode: "Point of Contact"	
2014	Perception		Episode: "Prologue"	
