= 42nd Academy Awards =

- Date: April 7, 1970
- Site: Dorothy Chandler Pavilion, Los Angeles
- Produced by: M. J. Frankovich
- Directed by: Richard Dunlap; Jack Haley Jr.

Highlights
- Best Picture: Midnight Cowboy
- Most awards: Butch Cassidy and the Sundance Kid (4)
- Most nominations: Anne of the Thousand Days (10)

TV in the United States
- Network: ABC
- Duration: 2 hours, 25 minutes
- Ratings: 43.4% (Nielsen ratings)

The 42nd Academy Awards were presented April 7, 1970, at the Dorothy Chandler Pavilion in Los Angeles, California. For the second year in a row, there was no official host. This was the first Academy Awards ceremony to be broadcast via satellite to an international audience, although Brazil was the only country outside North America to air the event live.

One year after Oliver! became the only G-rated film to win Best Picture, Midnight Cowboy became the first and only X-rated film to win, though its rating was changed in 1971 to R after the MPAA revised its ratings criteria. Only one other X-rated film has been nominated for Best Picture since, Stanley Kubrick's A Clockwork Orange (1971), which was also subsequently downgraded to an R rating (though this was a result of cuts to the original film).

They Shoot Horses, Don't They? set an Oscar record by receiving nine nominations without one for Best Picture. This was the last time until the 68th Academy Awards wherein none of the four winning performances came from Best Picture nominated films, as well as the first ceremony in which every acting nomination was in color. Jack Nicholson, who would go on to become the most-nominated male performer in Oscars history, received his first nomination, for Best Supporting Actor for Easy Rider.

== The ceremony ==
This was the first Academy Award ceremony intended to be broadcast via satellite worldwide, but according to Klaus Lehmann, a foreign sales executive of the ABC television network, in addition to Canada and Mexico (countries which had broadcast the event since 1953, and carried it live since 1964), only two South American countries, Chile and Brazil, roughly in the Oscars' time zone, were interested in the live coverage. The Chilean television rights to the Oscars were sold by ABC International to Televisión Nacional de Chile while the Brazilian rights were sold to TV Tupi. The latter country's rights to the TV broadcast of the Oscars were moved to a joint venture of TV Bandeirantes and TV Record.

Since at the time television standards conversion was difficult, about 50 other countries broadcast the Oscars on a delay. Furthermore, in Europe, most TV broadcasters signed off at or just after midnight; thus the Oscars were not broadcast live and were recorded on film and then shipped to broadcasters with a minimum four-day delay from the awards' broadcast date. An early attempt to change the Academy Awards presentation's start time to 1 p.m. to fit European television audiences was rejected by AMPAS executives.

In terms of performances, in-between presenting the documentary awards, Bob Hope and Fred Astaire discussed how Astaire had never danced on the Academy Awards broadcast before, with Astaire claiming to have "given it [dancing] up" the previous year. Cuing the orchestra, Hope then left the stage as Astaire began an ‘‘impromptu’’ dance performance (actually scripted and rehearsed), first in a modern jazz style before ending with traditional tap dancing (this would not be Astaire's final dance performance as he would dance in the film That's Entertainment, Part II six years later). They Shoot Horses, Don't They? holds the record for having the most nominations for a film without a Best Picture nomination, receiving 9 nominations.

Cary Grant's award was described as the most popular of the evening; the audience was described as having "went wild" over his receiving the Academy Honorary Award.

== Winners and nominees ==
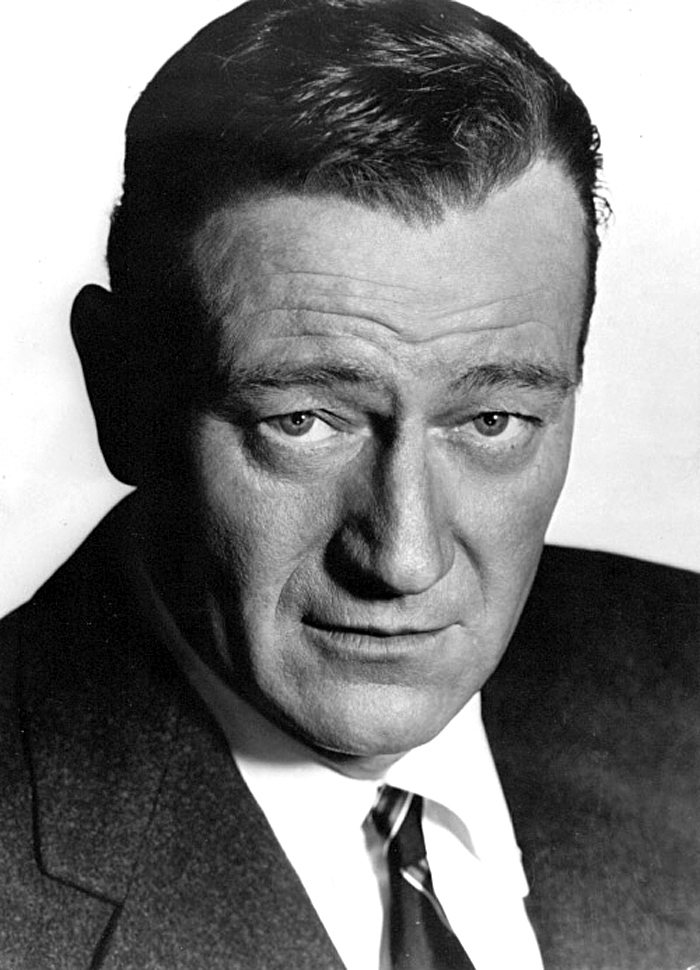
John Wayne, Best Actor winner

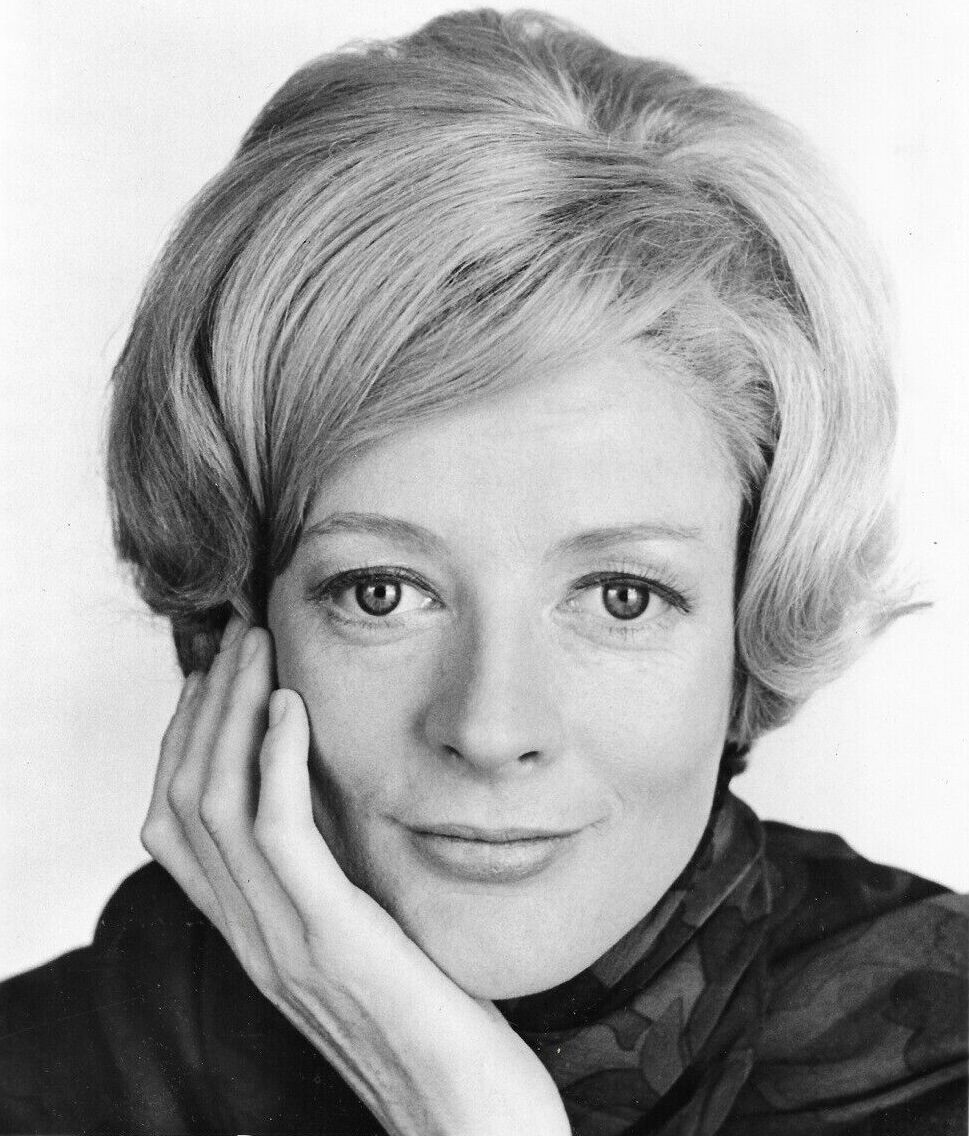
Maggie Smith, Best Actress winner

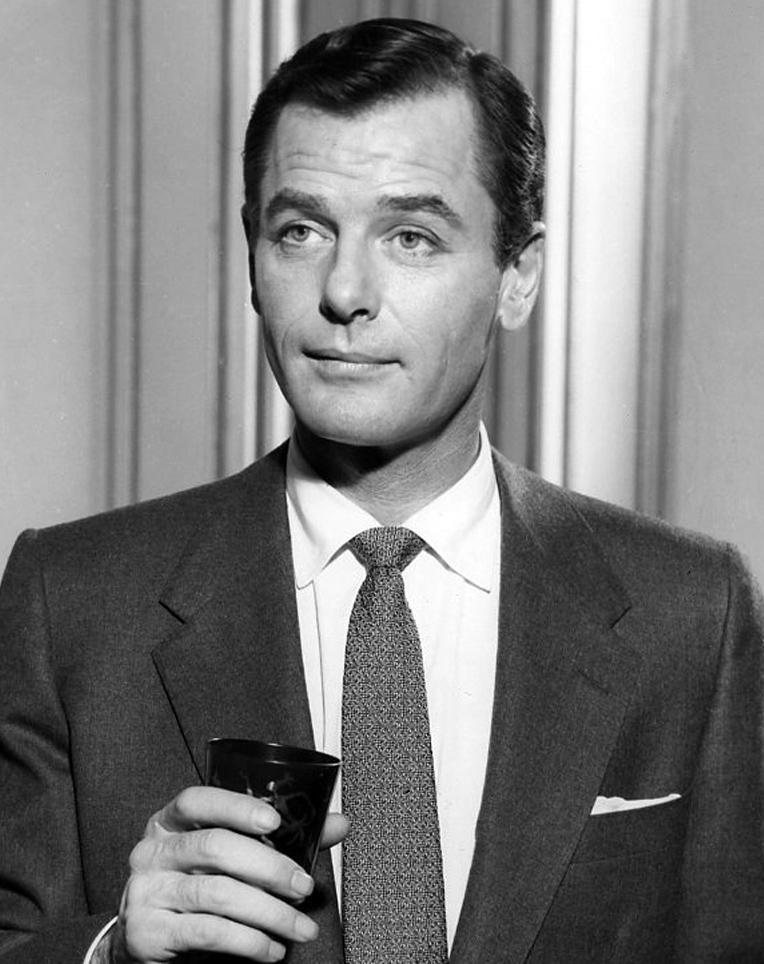
Gig Young, Best Supporting Actor winner

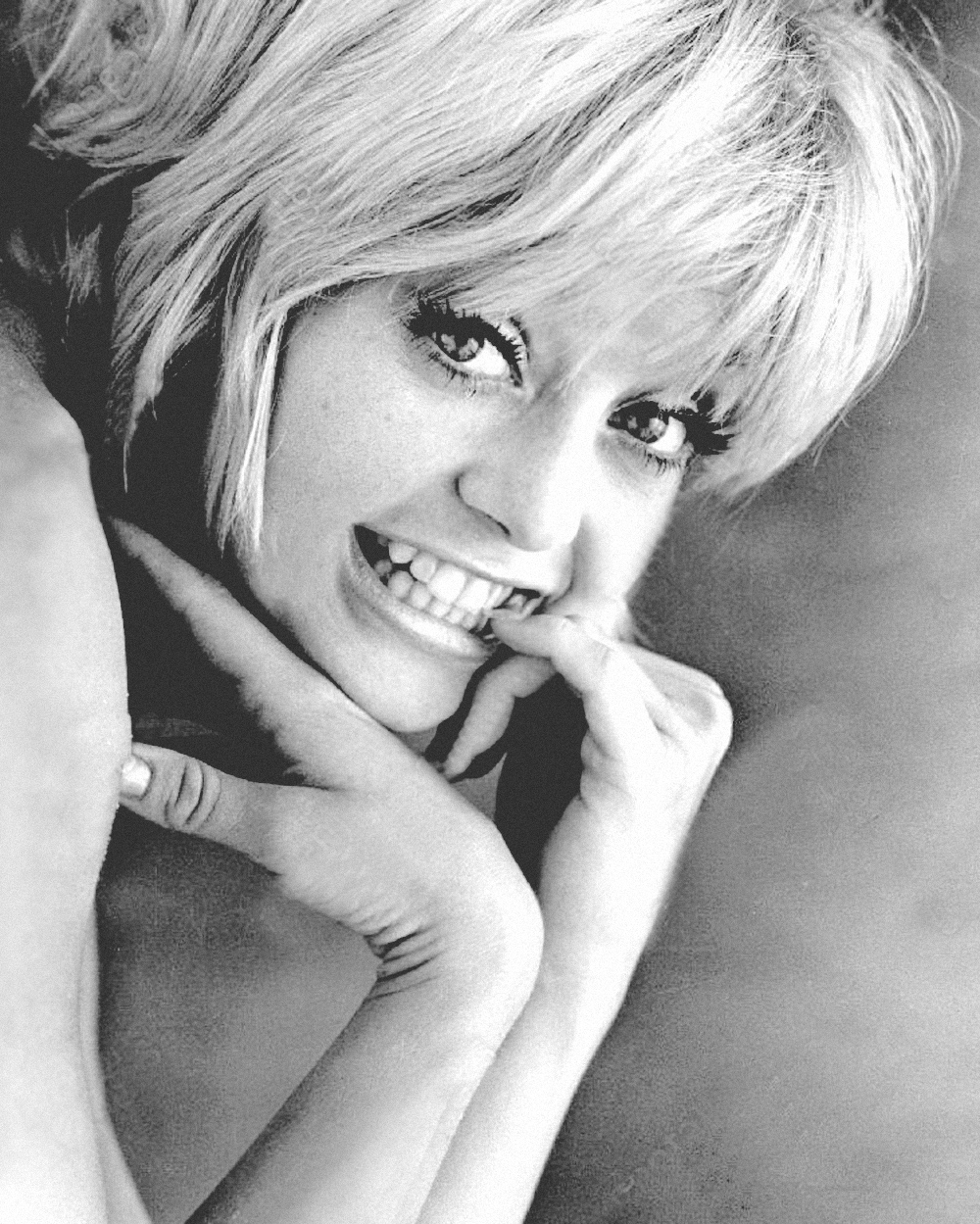
Goldie Hawn, Best Supporting Actress winner

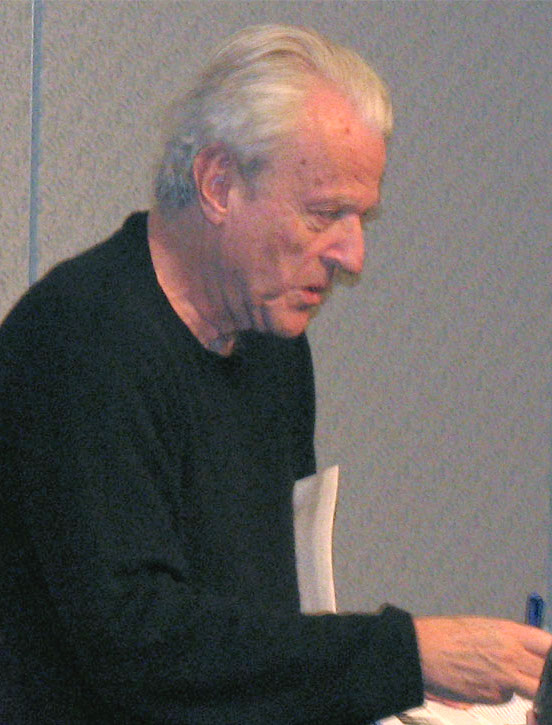
William Goldman, Best Original Screenplay winner

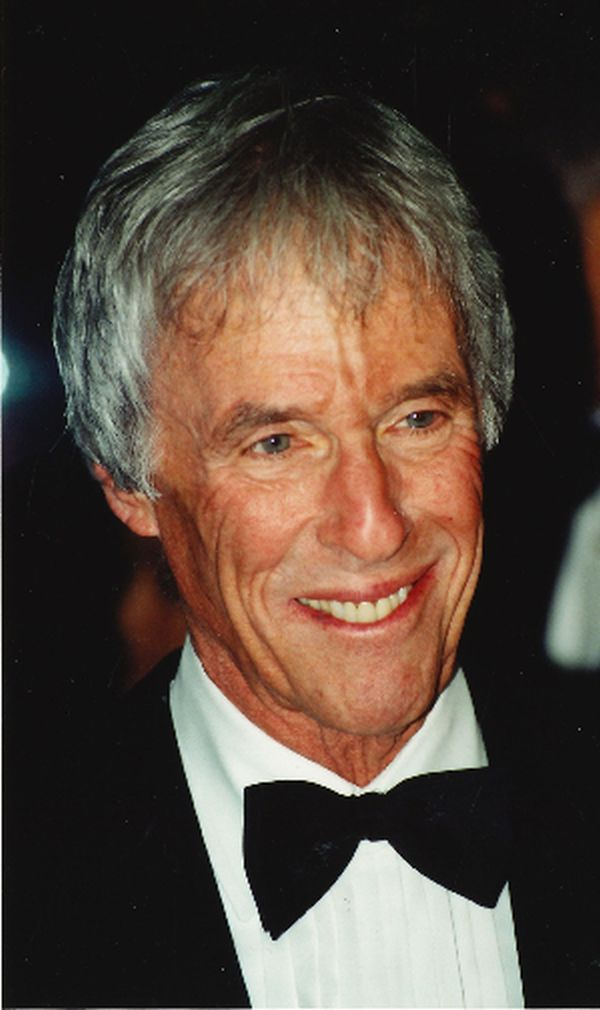
Burt Bacharach, Best Original Score (Not a Musical) winner & Best Original Song co-winner

Nominees were announced on February 16, 1970. Winners are listed first and highlighted in boldface.

**Best Picture**: **Midnight Cowboy – Jerome Hellman, producer**; Anne of the Thousand Days – Hal B. Wallis, producer; Butch Cassidy and the Sundance Kid – John Foreman, producer; Hello, Dolly! – Ernest Lehman, producer; Z – Jacques Perrin and Ahmed Rachedi, producers	**Best Directing**: **John Schlesinger – Midnight Cowboy**; Arthur Penn – Alice's Restaurant; George Roy Hill – Butch Cassidy and the Sundance Kid; Sydney Pollack – They Shoot Horses, Don't They?; Costa-Gavras – Z
**Best Actor**: **John Wayne – True Grit as Rooster Cogburn**; Richard Burton – Anne of the Thousand Days as King Henry VIII of England; Dustin Hoffman – Midnight Cowboy as Enrico "Ratso" Rizzo; Peter O'Toole – Goodbye, Mr. Chips as Arthur Chipping; Jon Voight – Midnight Cowboy as Joe Buck	**Best Actress**: **Maggie Smith – The Prime of Miss Jean Brodie as Jean Brodie**; Geneviève Bujold – Anne of the Thousand Days as Anne Boleyn; Jane Fonda – They Shoot Horses, Don't They? as Gloria Beatty; Liza Minnelli – The Sterile Cuckoo as Mary Ann "Pookie" Adams; Jean Simmons – The Happy Ending as Mary Wilson
**Best Actor in a Supporting Role**: **Gig Young – They Shoot Horses, Don't They? as Rocky**; Rupert Crosse – The Reivers as Ned; Elliott Gould – Bob & Carol & Ted & Alice as Ted Henderson; Jack Nicholson – Easy Rider as George Hanson; Anthony Quayle – Anne of the Thousand Days as Thomas Wolsey	**Best Actress in a Supporting Role**: **Goldie Hawn – Cactus Flower as Toni Simmons**; Catherine Burns – Last Summer as Rhoda; Dyan Cannon – Bob & Carol & Ted & Alice as Alice Henderson; Sylvia Miles – Midnight Cowboy as Cass; Susannah York – They Shoot Horses, Don't They? as Alice LeBlanc
**Best Writing (Story and Screenplay -- Based on Material Not Previously Published or Produced)**: **Butch Cassidy and the Sundance Kid – William Goldman**; Bob & Carol & Ted & Alice – Paul Mazursky and Larry Tucker; The Damned – Story by Nicola Badalucco; Screenplay by Nicola Badalucco, Enrico Medioli, and Luchino Visconti; Easy Rider – Peter Fonda, Dennis Hopper and Terry Southern; The Wild Bunch – Story by Walon Green and Roy N. Sickner; Screenplay by Walon Green and Sam Peckinpah	**Best Writing (Screenplay -- Based on Material from Another Medium)**: **Midnight Cowboy – Waldo Salt based on the novel by James Leo Herlihy**; Anne of the Thousand Days – Screenplay by John Hale and Bridget Boland; Adaptation by Richard Sokolove based on the play by Maxwell Anderson; Goodbye, Columbus – Arnold Schulman based on the novel by Philip Roth; They Shoot Horses, Don't They? – James Poe and Robert E. Thompson based on the novel by Horace McCoy; Z – Jorge Semprún and Costa-Gavras based on the novel by Vassilis Vassilikos
**Best Foreign Language Film**: **Z (Algeria)**; Ådalen 31 (Sweden); Battle of Neretva (Yugoslavia); The Brothers Karamazov (Soviet Union); My Night at Maud's (France)	**Best Documentary (Feature)**: **Arthur Rubinstein – The Love of Life – Bernard Chevry**; Before the Mountain Was Moved – Robert K. Sharpe; In the Year of the Pig – Emile de Antonio; The Olympics in Mexico – Comite Organizador de los Juegos de la XIX Olimpiada; The Wolf Men – Irwin Rosten
**Best Documentary (Short Subject)**: **Czechoslovakia 1968 – Denis Sanders and Robert M. Fresco**; An Impression of John Steinbeck: Writer – Donald Wrye; Jenny Is a Good Thing – Joan Horvath; Leo Beuerman – Arthur H. Wolf and Russell A. Mosser; The Magic Machines – Joan Keller Stern	**Best Short Subject (Live Action)**: **The Magic Machines – Joan Keller Stern**; Blake – Doug Jackson; People Soup – Marc Merson
**Best Short Subject (Cartoon)**: **It's Tough to Be a Bird – Ward Kimball**; Of Men and Demons – John Hubley and Faith Hubley; Walking – Ryan Larkin	**Best Music (Original Score -- for a Motion Picture (Not a Musical))**: **Butch Cassidy and the Sundance Kid – Burt Bacharach**; Anne of the Thousand Days – Georges Delerue; The Reivers – John Williams; The Secret of Santa Vittoria – Ernest Gold; The Wild Bunch – Jerry Fielding
**Best Music (Score of a Musical Picture -- Original or Adaptation)**: **Hello, Dolly! – Adaptation score by Lennie Hayton and Lionel Newman**; Goodbye, Mr. Chips – Music and Lyrics by Leslie Bricusse; Adaptation score by John Williams; Paint Your Wagon – Adaptation score by Nelson Riddle; Sweet Charity – Adaptation score by Cy Coleman; They Shoot Horses, Don't They? – Adaptation score by Johnny Green and Albert Woodbury	**Best Music (Song -- Original for the Picture)**: **"Raindrops Keep Fallin' on My Head" from Butch Cassidy and the Sundance Kid – Music by Burt Bacharach; Lyrics by Hal David**; "Come Saturday Morning" from The Sterile Cuckoo – Music by Fred Karlin; Lyrics by Dory Previn; "Jean" from The Prime of Miss Jean Brodie – Music and Lyrics by Rod McKuen; "True Grit" from True Grit – Music by Elmer Bernstein; Lyrics by Don Black; "What Are You Doing the Rest of Your Life?" from The Happy Ending – Music by Michel Legrand; Lyrics by Alan and Marilyn Bergman
**Best Sound**: **Hello, Dolly! – Jack Solomon and Murray Spivack**; Anne of the Thousand Days – John Aldred; Butch Cassidy and the Sundance Kid – William Edmondson and David Dockendorf; Gaily, Gaily – Robert Martin and Clem Portman; Marooned – Les Fresholtz and Arthur Piantadosi	**Best Art Direction**: **Hello, Dolly! – Art Direction: John DeCuir, Jack Martin Smith, and Herman A. Blumenthal; Set Decoration: Walter M. Scott, George James Hopkins, and Raphaël Bretton**; Anne of the Thousand Days – Art Direction: Maurice Carter and Lionel Couch; Set Decoration: Patrick McLoughlin; Gaily, Gaily – Art Direction: Robert F. Boyle and George B. Chan; Set Decoration: Edward G. Boyle and Carl Biddiscombe; Sweet Charity – Art Direction: Alexander Golitzen and George C. Webb; Set Decoration: Jack D. Moore; They Shoot Horses, Don't They? – Art Direction: Harry Horner; Set Decoration: Frank R. McKelvy
**Best Cinematography**: **Butch Cassidy and the Sundance Kid – Conrad Hall**; Anne of the Thousand Days – Arthur Ibbetson; Bob & Carol & Ted & Alice – Charles Lang; Hello, Dolly! – Harry Stradling (posthumous nomination); Marooned – Daniel L. Fapp	**Best Costume Design**: **Anne of the Thousand Days – Margaret Furse**; Gaily, Gaily – Ray Aghayan; Hello, Dolly! – Irene Sharaff; Sweet Charity – Edith Head; They Shoot Horses, Don't They? – Donfeld
**Best Film Editing**: **Z — Françoise Bonnot**; Hello, Dolly! — William H. Reynolds; Midnight Cowboy — Hugh A. Robertson; The Secret of Santa Vittoria — William Lyon and Earle Herdan; They Shoot Horses, Don't They? — Fredric Steinkamp	**Best Special Visual Effects**: **Marooned – Robbie Robertson**; Krakatoa, East of Java – Eugène Lourié and Alex Weldon

=== Honorary Award ===
- To Cary Grant for his unique mastery of the art of screen acting with the respect and affection of his colleagues.

=== Jean Hersholt Humanitarian Award ===
- George Jessel

=== Multiple nominations and awards ===
These films had multiple nominations:

- 10 nominations: Anne of the Thousand Days
- 9 nominations: They Shoot Horses, Don't They?
- 7 nominations: Butch Cassidy and the Sundance Kid, Hello, Dolly! and Midnight Cowboy
- 5 nominations: Z
- 4 nominations: Bob & Carol & Ted & Alice
- 3 nominations: Gaily, Gaily, Marooned and Sweet Charity
- 2 nominations: Easy Rider, Goodbye, Mr. Chips, The Happy Ending, The Magic Machines, The Prime of Miss Jean Brodie, The Reivers, The Secret of Santa Vittoria, The Sterile Cuckoo, True Grit and The Wild Bunch

The following films received multiple awards.

- 4 wins: Butch Cassidy and the Sundance Kid
- 3 wins: Hello, Dolly! and Midnight Cowboy
- 2 wins: Z

== Presenters and performers ==
- Fred Astaire (Presenter: Best Supporting Actress and Documentary Awards)
- Candice Bergen (Presenter: Best Sound, Best Costume Design and Best Song Original for the Picture)
- Elmer Bernstein (Presenter: Best Original Score for a Musical Picture Original or Adaptation)
- Claudia Cardinale (Presenter: Best Film Editing and Best Foreign Language Film)
- Clint Eastwood (Presenter: Best Foreign Language Film)
- Elliott Gould (Presenter: Best Sound)
- Bob Hope (Presenter: Jean Hersholt Humanitarian Award and Documentary Awards)
- James Earl Jones (Presenter: Best Film Editing and Best Story and Screenplay Based on Factual Material or Material Not Previously Published or Produced)
- Myrna Loy (Presenter: Best Short Subjects, Best Art Direction and Best Director)
- Ali MacGraw (Presenter: Best Story and Screenplay Based on Factual Material or Material Not Previously Published or Produced)
- Barbara McNair (Presenter: Best Original Score for a Motion Picture (Non-Musical))
- Cliff Robertson (Presenter: Best Actress, Best Original Score for a Motion Picture (Not a Musical) & Short Subjects Awards)
- Katharine Ross (Presenter: Best Supporting Actor and Best Screenplay Based on Material from Another Medium)
- Frank Sinatra (Presenter: Honorary Award to Cary Grant)
- Barbra Streisand (Presenter: Best Actor)
- Elizabeth Taylor (Presenter: Best Picture)
- Jon Voight (Presenter: Best Art Direction and Best Screenplay Based on Material from Another Medium)
- Shani Wallis (Presenter: Best Original Score for a Musical Picture Original or Adaptation)
- John Wayne (Presenter: Best Cinematography)
- Raquel Welch (Presenter: Best Special Visual Effects)

=== Performers ===
- Glen Campbell ("True Grit" from True Grit)
- Michel Legrand ("What Are You Doing the Rest of Your Life?" from The Happy Ending)
- Lou Rawls ("Jean" from The Prime of Miss Jean Brodie)
- The Sandpipers ("Come Saturday Morning" from The Sterile Cuckoo)
- B. J. Thomas ("Raindrops Keep Fallin' on My Head" from Butch Cassidy and the Sundance Kid)
- Fred Astaire (untitled dance in-between presentation of the two documentary awards)

== See also ==
- List of most watched television broadcasts
- 27th Golden Globe Awards
- 1969 in film
- 12th Grammy Awards
- 21st Primetime Emmy Awards
- 22nd Primetime Emmy Awards
- 23rd British Academy Film Awards
- 24th Tony Awards
