= 24th British Academy Film Awards =

1971 film awards ceremony

- Date: 4 March 1971
- Site: Royal Albert Hall, London

Highlights
- Best Film: Butch Cassidy and the Sundance Kid
- Best Actor: Robert Redford; Butch Cassidy and the Sundance Kid, Downhill Racer, and Tell Them Willie Boy Is Here
- Best Actress: Katharine Ross; Butch Cassidy and the Sundance Kid and Tell Them Willie Boy Is Here
- Most awards: Butch Cassidy and the Sundance Kid (9)
- Most nominations: Butch Cassidy and the Sundance Kid & Ryan's Daughter (10)

The 24th British Academy Film Awards, given by the British Academy of Film and Television Arts in 1971, honoured the best films of 1970. The awards were held at the Royal Albert Hall, London and held on 4 March 1971. For the first time, the Society bestowed a Fellowship on someone who had left a permanent influence on the world of the big or small screen. The first BAFTA Fellowship Award was bestowed on Alfred Hitchcock Fellowship Award at this award event from Princess Anne.

== Winners and nominees ==
| Best Film Butch Cassidy and the Sundance Kid – George Roy Hill: Kes – Ken Loach; M*A*S*H – Robert Altman; Ryan's Daughter – David Lean | Best Direction George Roy Hill – Butch Cassidy and the Sundance Kid: David Lean – Ryan's Daughter; Ken Loach – Kes; Robert Altman – M*A*S*H |
| Best Actor in a Leading Role Robert Redford – Butch Cassidy and the Sundance Kid as Sundance Kid; Robert Redford – Downhill Racer as David Chappellet; Robert Redford – Tell Them Willie Boy Is Here as Deputy Sheriff Christopher Cooper: Elliott Gould – Bob & Carol & Ted & Alice as Ted Henderson; Elliott Gould – M*A*S*H as Captain John Francis "Trapper John" McIntyre; George C. Scott – Patton as Major General George S. Patton; Paul Newman – Butch Cassidy and the Sundance Kid as Butch Cassidy | Best Actress in a Leading Role Katharine Ross – Butch Cassidy and the Sundance Kid as Etta Place; Katharine Ross – Tell Them Willie Boy Is Here as Lola: Goldie Hawn – Cactus Flower as Toni Simmons; Goldie Hawn – There's a Girl in My Soup as Marion; Jane Fonda – They Shoot Horses, Don't They? as Gloria Beatty; Sarah Miles – Ryan's Daughter as Rosy Ryan |
| Best Actor in a Supporting Role Colin Welland – Kes as Mr. Farthing: Bernard Cribbins – The Railway Children as Albert Perks; Gig Young – They Shoot Horses, Don't They? as Rocky; John Mills – Ryan's Daughter as Michael | Best Actress in a Supporting Role Susannah York – They Shoot Horses, Don't They? as Alice LeBlanc: Estelle Parsons – Watermelon Man as Althea Gerber; Maureen Stapleton – Airport as Inez Guerrero; Evin Crowley – Ryan's Daughter as Moureen Cassidy |
| Best Screenplay Butch Cassidy and the Sundance Kid – William Goldman: Bob & Carol & Ted & Alice – Paul Mazursky and Larry Tucker; Kes – Barry Hines, Ken Loach and Tony Garnett; They Shoot Horses, Don't They? – James Poe and Robert E. Thompson | Best Cinematography Butch Cassidy and the Sundance Kid – Conrad Hall: Catch-22 – David Watkin; Ryan's Daughter – Freddie Young; Waterloo – Armando Nannuzzi |
| Best Costume Design Waterloo – Maria De Matteis: Anne of the Thousand Days – Margaret Furse; Cromwell – Vittorio Nino Novarese; Ryan's Daughter – Jocelyn Rickards | Best Editing Butch Cassidy and the Sundance Kid – John C. Howard and Richard C. Meyer: M*A*S*H – Danford B. Greene; Ryan's Daughter – Norman Savage; They Shoot Horses, Don't They? – Fredric Steinkamp |
| Best Original Music Butch Cassidy and the Sundance Kid – Burt Bacharach: Alice's Restaurant – Arlo Guthrie; Figures in a Landscape – Richard Rodney Bennett; The Railway Children – Johnny Douglas | Best Production Design Waterloo – Mario Garbuglia: Anne of the Thousand Days – Maurice Carter; Ryan's Daughter – Stephen B. Grimes; Scrooge – Terence Marsh |
| Best Sound Butch Cassidy and the Sundance Kid – Don Hall, David Dockendorf and William Edmondson: M*A*S*H – Don Hall, David Dockendorf and Bernard Freericks; Patton – Don Hall, Douglas Williams and Don Bassman; Ryan's Daughter – Winston Ryder and Gordon McCallum | Most Promising Newcomer to Leading Film Roles Dai Bradley – Kes as Billy Casper: Liza Minnelli – The Sterile Cuckoo as Mary Ann Adams; Michael Sarrazin – They Shoot Horses, Don't They? as Robert Syverton; Sally Thomsett – The Railway Children as Phyllis Waterbury |
| Best Short Animation Henry Nine ' Til Five – Bob Godfrey: Children and Cars – John Halas; Espollo – Sidney Goldsmith; It's Tough to Be a Bird – Ward Kimball | Best Documentary Sad Song of Yellow Skin – National Film Board of Canada |
| Best Short Film The Shadow of Progress – Derek Williams: Blake – Bill Mason; The Gallery – Philip Mark Law; The Winds of Fogo – Colin Law | Best Specialised Film The Rise and Fall of the Great Lakes – Bill Mason: Continental Drift – Co Hoedeman; Policeman – Eric Marquis; A Study in Change – Michael Orrom |
| Fellowship Award Alfred Hitchcock | United Nations Award M*A*S*H – Robert Altman: Catch-22 – Mike Nichols; The Confession – Costa-Gavras; Kes – Ken Loach |

== Statistics ==
Films that received multiple nominations
| Nominations | Film |
|---|---|
| 10 | Butch Cassidy and the Sundance Kid |
| 10 | Ryan's Daughter |
| 6 | Kes |
| 6 | MASH |
| 6 | They Shoot Horses, Don't They? |
| 3 | The Railway Children |
| 3 | Waterloo |
| 2 | Anne of the Thousand Days |
| 2 | Bob & Carol & Ted & Alice |
| 2 | Catch-22 |
| 2 | Patton |
| 2 | Tell Them Willie Boy Is Here |

Films that received multiple awards
| Awards | Film |
|---|---|
| 9 | Butch Cassidy and the Sundance Kid |
| 2 | Kes |
| 2 | Tell Them Willie Boy Is Here |
| 2 | Waterloo |

== See also ==
- 43rd Academy Awards
- 23rd Directors Guild of America Awards
- 28th Golden Globe Awards
- 23rd Writers Guild of America Awards
