= Surface mining reclamation in West Virginia =

Surface Mining is done all over the United States and this causes growing concerns about the impact on the environment. West Virginia is one of the leading coal mining states in the USA and the environmental debate has never been stronger. There have been battles fought and protest marches to raise awareness for environmental impacts of coal mining. The US government took action and put in place guidelines and restrictions for mining as well as laws to protect the land after mining is completed. This was done with the Surface Mining Control and Reclamation Act. The impact of this act on the reclaimed land and its uses have made a positive impact, nowhere more so than in West Virginia.

== Surface Mining Control and Reclamation Act ==
The Surface Mining Control and Reclamation Act (SMCRA) was approved on August 3, 1977. This Act established guidelines for the regulation of surface mining and the reclamation of the mine sites. This is enforced under the administration of the Office of Surface Mining, Reclamation and Enforcement, in the Department of the Interior. The law establishes minimum requirements uniform for all surface coal mining on Federal and State lands, including exploration activities and the surface effects of underground mining. Mine operators are required to minimize disturbances and the adverse impact on fish, wildlife and related environmental elements and maintain the integrity of such resources when possible. Restoration of land and water resources is a priority in reclamation planning.

== Uses for reclaimed land ==
There are multiple ways that reclaimed land can be used. One of the main goals of SMCRA is to restore the land as close to its original state, or better, and use it for the good of the environment. Some popular ways this reclaimed land is used include: range land, prime farmland, wildlife refuges, wetlands, recreation areas, and military training outposts. In the U.S. there has been approximately 2.6 million acres of land reclaimed over the past 35 years. This also accounts for land mined before SMCRA was enacted and contributed nearly $10 billion dollars.

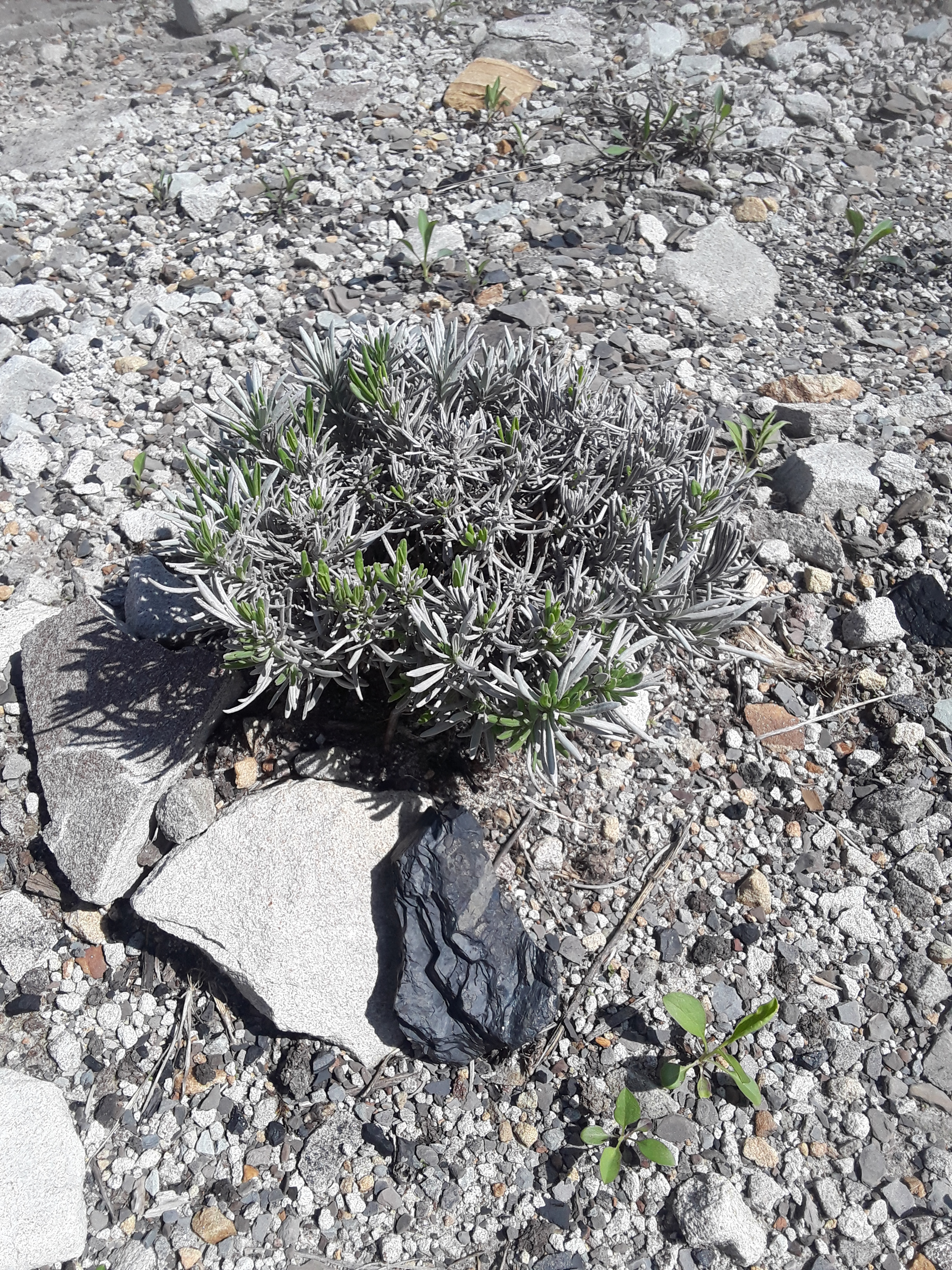
Lavender growing in reclaimed mining site on Taylor Morgan Mining site in West Virginia

== Reclaimed Land in West Virginia ==
In West Virginia, the main uses for reclaimed mining sites are recreational, farming, and military training. One such farming use is the growing of lavender. There are many different types of lavender but surprisingly, they all thrive in the dry rocky soil that surface mining leaves behind. The Green Mining Project has taken full advantage of this and has planned for many lavender fields on reclaimed sites in WV, such as Prichard mining sites, including the Taylor Morgan Mine.

Another reclamation project in West Virginia is in Mingo County. Nathan Hall, President of Reclaim Appalachia spoke at Tamarack on plans to develop a commercial agroforestry site next to Buck Harless Wood Products. This site is in Holden and would be used for growing and harvesting produce native to West Virginia such as blackberries, hazelnuts, lavender, and paw paws. This site would also be used to farm animals such as hogs, goats, chickens, and honeybees and they would be used for "rotational grazing techniques" for optimal harvesting. Hall says “You have the animals in between the orchard growth keeping the areas maintained,” he said. “It’s benefiting the roots and the trees. You’re also able to sell the meat and eggs while harvesting fruit and berries.”

Reclamation just for usable water is also taking place on West Virginia Mine sites. The West Virginia Department of Environmental Protection has started water reclamation on at least 2 sites, Carson One Mining and Cheyenne Sales Company. The Carson One Mining site cost $2.7 million and the Cheyenne Sales Company site cost $2.1 million to fund. These are ongoing and require continuous testing of the water but long term investments could well exceed the cost of the initial reclamation.

== The Green Mining Project ==
“The Green Mining Project program is based at the West Virginia Regional Technology Park, which is a state-of-the-art chemical processing and commercialization center with essential intellectual capital and facilities. The Park is capable of supporting surface mine agricultural sites anywhere in the Appalachian Region. Businesses partnering with the Green Mining Model Business Program are the WV ***National Guard (WVNG), several mine land owners and operators, chemists, WV Department of Agriculture (WV AG), and faculty and students from WV State University (WVSU).”

Andrew Jordan, operator of the Prichard Mining company, explained that the lavender planted on their Taylor Morgan mining site was planted, in part by students from West Virginia State University. They have partnered with the Green Mining Project to make these mining sites profitable and beautiful again for the state of West Virginia. In order to sell to large commercial companies, these sites must produce at least 2,000 gallons of lavender oil. According to an interview with Mr. Jordan, Johnson & Johnson it indeed one of the buyers of the lavender oil produced from their site.

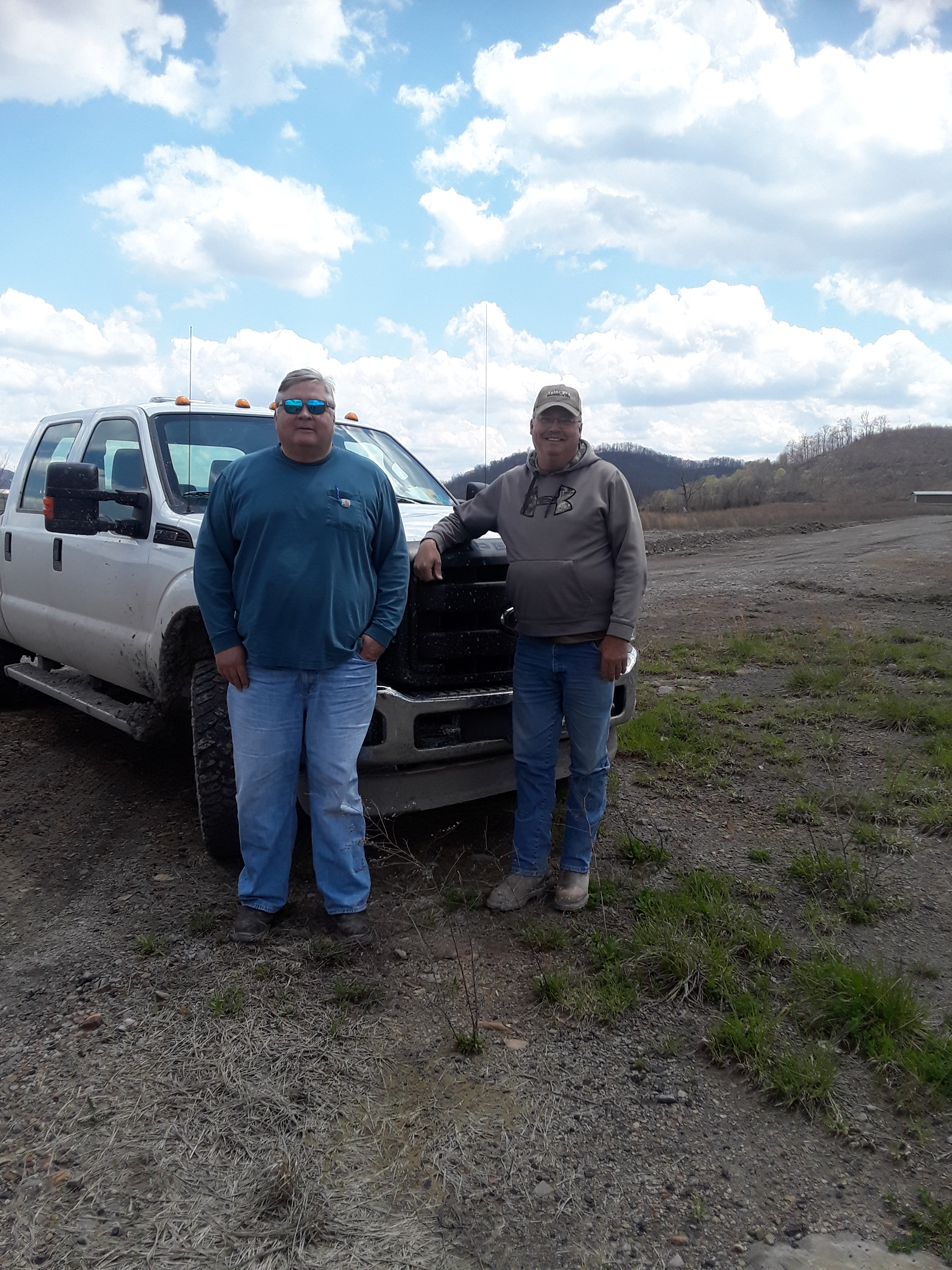
Andrew Jordan (on left) with one of his mine employees.

The coordinators with the Green Mining Program say they’re applying for another federal grant to help them transition to a co-op model. If they succeed, the lavender farmers would be the owners of the entire business and operation within three years. This movement will not only prove profitable for the state of West Virginia, but also to the citizens of the state as well as the country.

== See also ==
- Before the Mountain Was Moved
