= The Magic Machines =

1969 film

- Directed by: Bob Curtis
- Produced by: Joan Keller Stern
- Starring: Robert Gilbert
- Cinematography: Steve Grumette; Gil Hubbs
- Edited by: Steve Grumette
- Distributed by: Columbia Pictures; Manson Distributing
- Release date: 1969
- Country: United States
- Language: English

The Magic Machines is a 1969 American short documentary film directed by Bob Curtis about kinetic artist Robert Gilbert. It won an Oscar at the 42nd Academy Awards in 1970 for Academy Award for Best Live Action Short Film (awarded to producer Joan Keller Stern) and was nominated for Academy Award for Best Documentary (Short Subject). The film also received the Jury Prize at the 1970 Cannes Film Festival.

== Cast ==
- Robert Gilbert
