= Butch Cassidy and the Sundance Kid =

1969 film by George Roy Hill

- Theatrical release poster by Tom Beauvais
- Directed by: George Roy Hill
- Written by: William Goldman
- Produced by: John Foreman
- Starring: Paul Newman; Robert Redford; Katharine Ross
- Cinematography: Conrad Hall
- Edited by: John C. Howard; Richard C. Meyer
- Music by: Burt Bacharach
- Production companies: Campanile Productions; 20th Century Fox
- Distributed by: 20th Century Fox
- Release dates: September 23, 1969 (New Haven); September 24, 1969 (New York City)
- Running time: 110 minutes
- Country: United States
- Language: English
- Budget: $6 million
- Box office: $102 million (North America)

Butch Cassidy and the Sundance Kid is a 1969 American Western buddy film directed by George Roy Hill and written by William Goldman. Based loosely on fact, the film tells the story of Wild West outlaws Robert LeRoy Parker, known as Butch Cassidy (Paul Newman), and his partner Harry Longabaugh, the "Sundance Kid" (Robert Redford), who are on the run from a crack US posse after a string of train robberies. The pair and Sundance's lover, Etta Place (Katharine Ross), flee to Bolivia to escape the posse.

The film was released on September 24, 1969, and while initial reviews from critics were lukewarm, it has since seen a positive retrospective reappraisal. In 2003, the film was selected for preservation in the United States National Film Registry by the Library of Congress as being "culturally, historically, or aesthetically significant". The American Film Institute ranked Butch Cassidy and the Sundance Kid as the 73rd-greatest American film on its "AFI's 100 Years...100 Movies (10th Anniversary Edition)" list, and number 50 on the original list. Butch Cassidy and the Sundance Kid were ranked 20th-greatest heroes on "AFI's 100 Years...100 Heroes & Villains". Butch Cassidy and the Sundance Kid was selected by the American Film Institute as the 7th-greatest Western of all time in the AFI's 10 Top 10 list in 2008.

== Plot ==
Original release trailer of the film Butch Cassidy and the Sundance Kid (1969)

In 1898 Wyoming, Butch Cassidy is the affable, clever, talkative leader of the outlaw Hole-in-the-Wall Gang. His closest companion is the laconic dead-shot "Sundance Kid". Irritated by Cassidy's long absences, the gang selects Harvey Logan as their new leader. Cassidy defeats Logan in a knife fight to retain the gang's leadership and uses Logan's idea to rob a Union Pacific train on both its eastward and westward runs, agreeing that the second robbery would be unexpected and thus reap more money than the first.

The first robbery is a success and Cassidy visits a favorite brothel to celebrate. The town marshal appeals to the townsfolk to organize a posse to track down the gang but his speech is hijacked by a friendly bicycle salesman. Sundance visits his lover, schoolteacher Etta Place and Cassidy joins them, taking Place for a ride on his new bike.

During the second robbery, Cassidy uses too much dynamite on the safe and demolishes the baggage car. As the gang scrambles to gather the scattered money, a second train arrives carrying a six-man team of lawmen. The crack squad pursues Cassidy and Sundance, who hide in the brothel but are found and have to make a getaway. Cassidy and Sundance elude their pursuers by jumping from a cliff into a river far below. Place tells them the posse has been paid by Union Pacific head E. H. Harriman to remain on their trail until they are both killed.

The trio escape to Bolivia, which Cassidy envisions as a robber's paradise. Sundance is contemptuous of the country and its living conditions. Place teaches them enough Spanish to pull off a bank robbery and they become successful bank robbers known as Los Bandidos Yanquis. Their confidence drops after seeing a man wearing a white skimmer, fearing Harriman's posse is still after them. Cassidy suggests "going straight," and they gain honest work as payroll guards for a mining company. They're ambushed by local bandits on their first run, and their boss, Percy Garris, is killed. They kill the bandits, the first time Cassidy has ever shot someone. The duo concludes the straight life is not for them. Sensing they will be killed should they return to robbery, Place returns to the United States.

Cassidy and Sundance steal a payroll and the burro used to carry it. A boy in a small town recognizes the burro's brand and alerts the police, leading to a gunfight with the outlaws. Cassidy and Sundance are wounded and take cover inside a building, unaware the local police have been reinforced by Bolivian Army troops. The pair charges out of the building, guns blazing, into a hail of bullets. The film ends with the sound of gunfire on a freeze-frame shot of the two running bandits.

== Cast ==
- Paul Newman as Butch Cassidy
- Robert Redford as the Sundance Kid
- Katharine Ross as Etta Place
- Strother Martin as Percy Garris
- Jeff Corey as Sheriff Bledsoe
- George Furth as Woodcock
- Cloris Leachman as Agnes
- Ted Cassidy as Harvey Logan
- Timothy Scott as "News" Carver
- Charles Dierkop as Flat Nose Curry
- Henry Jones as Bike Salesman
- Kenneth Mars as Marshal
- Donnelly Rhodes as Macon
- Paul Bryar and Sam Elliott as Card Players
- Jody Gilbert as Large Woman on Train
- Pancho Córdova as Bank Manager
- Enrique Lucero as Bolivian Guard
- Nelson Olmsted as Photographer

== Production ==
=== Writing and development ===
William Goldman first came across the story of Butch Cassidy in the late 1950s and researched intermittently for eight years before starting to write the screenplay. Goldman says he wrote the story as an original screenplay because he did not want to do the research to make it as authentic as a novel. Goldman later stated:

The whole reason I wrote the ... thing, there is that famous line that Scott Fitzgerald wrote, who was one of my heroes, "There are no second acts in American lives." When I read about Cassidy and Longabaugh and the superposse coming after them—that's phenomenal material. They ran to South America and lived there for eight years and that was what thrilled me: they had a second act. They were more legendary in South America than they had been in the old West ... It's a great story. Those two guys and that pretty girl going down to South America and all that stuff. It just seems to me it's a wonderful piece of material.

The characters' flight to South America caused one executive to reject the script, as it was then unusual in Western films for the protagonists to flee. According to Goldman, when he first wrote the script and sent it out for consideration, only one studio wanted to buy it—and that was with the proviso that the two lead characters did not flee to South America. When Goldman protested that that was what had happened, the studio head responded, "I don't give a shit. All I know is John Wayne don't run away." He then rewrote the script, "didn't change it more than a few pages, and subsequently found that every studio wanted it."

=== Casting ===
The role of Sundance was offered to Jack Lemmon, whose production company, JML, had produced the film Cool Hand Luke (1967) starring Newman. Lemmon, however, turned down the role because he did not like riding horses and felt that he had already played too many aspects of the Sundance Kid's character before. Other actors considered for the role of Sundance were Steve McQueen and Warren Beatty, who both turned it down, with Beatty claiming that the film was too similar to Bonnie and Clyde.

According to Goldman, McQueen and Newman both read the scripts at the same time and agreed to do the film. McQueen eventually backed out of the film due to disagreements with Newman. The two actors would eventually team up in the 1974 disaster film The Towering Inferno. Redford took the role as he liked the script.

Jacqueline Bisset was a top contender for the role of Etta Place.

=== Filming ===
Principal photography took place on-location in Utah and Colorado, and in Mexico. Utah filming locations include the ghost town of Grafton, Zion National Park, Snow Canyon State Park, and the city of St. George. These areas remain popular film tourism destinations, including the Cassidy Trail in Red Canyon. Shooting in Mexico took place in Taxco, Cuernavaca, along the Sierra Madre Occidental, and at Estudios Churubusco in Mexico City.

== Soundtrack ==
Burt Bacharach and Hal David wrote the song "Raindrops Keep Fallin' on My Head" for the film. Some felt the song had the wrong tone for a Western, but George Roy Hill insisted on its inclusion. Robert Redford, one of the stars of the film, was among those who disapproved of using the song, though he later acknowledged he was wrong:

When the film was released, I was highly critical: How did the song fit with the film? There was no rain. At the time, it seemed like a dumb idea. How wrong I was, as it turned out to be a giant hit.

=== Personnel ===
- B.J. Thomas - voice
- Marvin Stamm − trumpet
- Pete Jolly − piano
- Hubert Laws − flute
- Bob Bain, Bill Pitman − guitar
- Tommy Tedesco − ukulele
- Carol Kaye − electric bass
- Emil Richards − percussion

== Release ==
=== Premieres ===
The world premiere of the film was on September 23, 1969, at the Roger Sherman Theater, in New Haven, Connecticut. The premiere was attended by Paul Newman, his wife Joanne Woodward, Robert Redford, George Roy Hill, William Goldman, and John Foreman, among others. It opened the next day in New York City at the Penthouse and Sutton theatres.

=== Home media ===
The film became available on DVD on May 16, 2000, in a special edition that is also available on VHS.

== Reception ==
=== Box office ===
The film grossed $82,625 in its opening week from two theatres in New York City. The following week, it expanded and became the number-one film in the United States and Canada for two weeks. It went on to earn $15 million in theatrical rentals in the United States and Canada by the end of 1969. According to Fox records, the film required $13,850,000 in rentals to break even, and by December 11, 1970, had made $36,825,000, so made a considerable profit to the studio. It eventually returned $45,953,000 in rentals.

With a final US gross over $100 million, it was the top-grossing film released in 1969.

It was the eighth-most-popular film of 1970 in France.

=== Critical response ===
After release, reviewers gave the film mediocre grades, and New York and national reviews were "mixed to terrible", although better elsewhere, screenwriter William Goldman recalled in his book Which Lie Did I Tell?: More Adventures in the Screen Trade.

New York Times film reviewer Vincent Canby wrote that the film is "very funny in a strictly contemporary way", but said that "at the heart of the film there is a gnawing emptiness that can't be satisfied by an awareness that Hill and Goldman knew exactly what they were doing---making a very slick movie". He described the "Raindrops" sequence as part of an effort to "play tricks on the audience" by "taking short cuts to lyricism". The performers, Canby wrote, "succeed, although the movie does not".

A Time reviewer said the film's two male stars are "afflicted with cinematic schizophrenia. One moment they are sinewy, battered remnants of a discarded tradition. The next, they are low comedians whose chaffing relationship—and dialogue—could have been lifted from a Batman and Robin episode." Time criticized the "Raindrops" sequence and the "scat-singing sound track by Burt Bacharach at his most cacophonous", which it said made the film "absurd and anachronistic".

Roger Ebert scored the film at two and a half out of four. He praised its beginning and the three lead actors, but felt it progressed too slowly and had an unsatisfactory ending. After Harriman hires his posse, though, Ebert thought the quality declined: "Hill apparently spent a lot of money to take his company on location for these scenes, and I guess when he got back to Hollywood, he couldn't bear to edit them out of the final version. So, the Super-posse chases our heroes unceasingly, until we've long since forgotten how well the movie started." Ebert reaffirmed his review in 1989 stating that he still thought it was a "turkey" and was baffled by its success.

Gene Siskel was also not a big fan of the film, stating he thought it was predictable and that it was "too cute to be believed … not memorable". Siskel later admitted in 1989 that publishing his negative review was one of his first challenges as film critic, recalling that the editorial assistant was shocked that he was giving a bad review to a film starring Paul Newman and would give him a lesson that he had to be honest as a critic, no matter how unpopular his opinion.

=== Accolades ===
| Award | Category | Nominee(s) | Result | Ref. |
|---|---|---|---|---|
| Academy Awards | Best Picture | John Foreman | Nominated | |
| Academy Awards | Best Director | George Roy Hill | Nominated | |
| Academy Awards | Best Story and Screenplay – Based on Material Not Previously Published or Produced | William Goldman | Won | |
| Academy Awards | Best Cinematography | Conrad Hall | Won | |
| Academy Awards | Best Original Score for a Motion Picture (Not a Musical) | Burt Bacharach | Won | |
| Academy Awards | Best Song – Original for the Picture | "Raindrops Keep Fallin' on My Head"; Music by Burt Bacharach; Lyrics by Hal David | Won | |
| Academy Awards | Best Sound | William Edmondson and David Dockendorf | Nominated | |
| American Cinema Editors Awards | Best Edited Feature Film | John C. Howard and Richard C. Meyer | Nominated | |
| ASCAP Film and Television Music Awards | Most Performed Feature Film Standards | "Raindrops Keep Fallin' on My Head"; Music by Burt Bacharach; Lyrics by Hal David | Won | |
| British Academy Film Awards | Best Film | George Roy Hill | Won | |
| British Academy Film Awards | Best Direction | George Roy Hill | Won | |
| British Academy Film Awards | Best Actor in a Leading Role | Paul Newman | Nominated | |
| British Academy Film Awards | Best Actor in a Leading Role | Robert Redford | Won | |
| British Academy Film Awards | Best Actress in a Leading Role | Katharine Ross | Won | |
| British Academy Film Awards | Best Screenplay | William Goldman | Won | |
| British Academy Film Awards | Best Cinematography | Conrad Hall | Won | |
| British Academy Film Awards | Best Editing | John C. Howard and Richard C. Meyer | Won | |
| British Academy Film Awards | Best Original Music | Burt Bacharach | Won | |
| British Academy Film Awards | Best Sound | Don Hall, William Edmondson, and David Dockendorf | Won | |
| Directors Guild of America Awards | Outstanding Directorial Achievement in Motion Pictures | George Roy Hill | Nominated | |
| Golden Globe Awards | Best Motion Picture – Drama | | Nominated | |
| Golden Globe Awards | Best Screenplay – Motion Picture | William Goldman | Nominated | |
| Golden Globe Awards | Best Original Score – Motion Picture | Burt Bacharach | Won | |
| Golden Globe Awards | Best Original Song – Motion Picture | "Raindrops Keep Fallin' on My Head"; Music by Burt Bacharach; Lyrics by Hal David | Nominated | |
| Grammy Awards | Best Original Score Written for a Motion Picture or a Television Special | Burt Bacharach | Won | |
| Laurel Awards | Top Action Drama | | Won | |
| Laurel Awards | Top Action Performance | Paul Newman | Nominated | |
| Laurel Awards | Top Action Performance | Robert Redford | 5th Place | |
| Laurel Awards | Top Cinematographer | Conrad L. Hall | 4th Place | |
| Laurel Awards | Top Music Man | Burt Bacharach | Won | |
| National Film Preservation Board | National Film Registry | | Inducted | |
| National Society of Film Critics Awards | Best Actor | Robert Redford | 3rd Place | |
| Online Film and Television Association Awards | Hall of Fame – Motion Picture | | Inducted | |
| Satellite Awards | Best Classic DVD | Butch Cassidy and the Sundance Kid (as part of Paul Newman: The Tribute Collection) | Nominated | |
| Turkish Film Critics Association Awards | Best Foreign Film | | 8th Place | |
| Writers Guild of America Awards | Best Drama Written Directly for the Screen | William Goldman | Won | |

Butch Cassidy and the Sundance Kid also appears on several of the American Film Institute's 100 Years lists.

- AFI's 100 Years... 100 Movies (1998) – #50
- AFI's 100 Years... 100 Thrills (2001) – #54
- AFI's 100 Years...100 Heroes & Villains (2003)
  - Butch Cassidy and the Sundance Kid – #20 Heroes
- AFI's 100 Years...100 Songs (2004)
  - "Raindrops Keep Fallin' on My Head" – #23
- AFI's 100 Years of Film Scores (2005) – Nominated
- AFI's 100 Years... 100 Movie Quotes (2005)
  - "Kid, the next time I say, 'Let's go someplace like Bolivia', let's go someplace like Bolivia." – Nominated
- AFI's 100 Years... 100 Movies (10th Anniversary Edition) (2007) – #73
- AFI's 10 Top 10 (2008) – #7 Western Film

== Legacy ==
American movie reviewers have been widely favorable. The film holds an 89% rating on Rotten Tomatoes based on 61 reviews with an average score of 8.3/10. The site's critical consensus reads: "With its iconic pairing of Paul Newman and Robert Redford, jaunty screenplay, and Burt Bacharach score, Butch Cassidy and the Sundance Kid has gone down as among the defining moments in late-'60s American cinema".

After working on Butch Cassidy and the Sundance Kid, Robert Redford renamed Timp Haven, a ski resort near Provo, Utah that he owned, as the Sundance Resort after the role he played in the film. In November 1979, Redford held a 3-day conference for filmmakers and professional artists at the resort, aiming to promote indie filmmakers. This laid the foundation for the Sundance Institute, founded in 1981 to foster and celebrate the diversity of American filmmaking. Beginning in 1985, the U.S. Film Festival was held at the Sundance Resort and organized by the Sundance Institute; the festival's name was officially changed to the Sundance Film Festival in 1991.

In 2006, the Writers Guild of America ranked William Goldman's screenplay 11th on its list of 101 Greatest Screenplays ever written.

The February 2020 issue of New York Magazine lists Butch Cassidy and the Sundance Kid as among "the Best Movies that Lost Best Picture at the Oscars".

In 2003, Butch Cassidy and the Sundance Kid was selected by The New York Times as one of The 1000 Best Movies Ever Made. In the same year, it was selected for preservation in the United States National Film Registry by the Library of Congress as being "culturally, historically, or aesthetically significant". In 2008, British film publication Empire ranked the film at number 32 on their list of the 500 Greatest Movies of All Time.

The film inspired the television series Alias Smith and Jones, starring Pete Duel and Ben Murphy as outlaws trying to earn an amnesty.

A parody titled "Botch Casually and the Somedunce Kid" was published in Mad. It was illustrated by Mort Drucker and written by Arnie Kogen in issue No. 136, July 1970.

== Related works ==
=== Made-for-television film ===
Katharine Ross reprised her role as Etta Place in the 1976 made-for-television film, Wanted: The Sundance Woman.

=== Prequel film ===
In 1979, Butch and Sundance: The Early Days, a prequel, was released starring Tom Berenger as Butch Cassidy and William Katt as the Sundance Kid. It was directed by Richard Lester and written by Allan Burns. William Goldman, the writer of the original film, was an executive producer. Jeff Corey was the only actor to appear in the original and the prequel.

=== Television adaptation ===
In September 2022, Amazon Studios announced a television adaptation, starring Regé-Jean Page and Glen Powell. Joe and Anthony Russo were to be executive producers under their AGBO production banner.

== See also ==
- George Roy Hill filmography
- List of American films of 1969
- Antihero (Cassidy and Sundance are considered "antiheroes".)

== Bibliography ==
- Egan, Sean (2014). William Goldman: The Reluctant Storyteller. Bear Manor Media.
