= Spider Baby =

1967 film by Jack Hill

- Theatrical release poster
- Directed by: Jack Hill
- Screenplay by: Jack Hill
- Produced by: Paul Monka; Gil Lasky
- Starring: Jill Banner; Lon Chaney Jr.; Carol Ohmart; Sid Haig; Mantan Moreland
- Cinematography: Alfred Taylor
- Edited by: Elliot Fayad
- Music by: Ronald Stein
- Production company: Lasky-Monka Productions
- Distributed by: American General Pictures
- Release date: December 8, 1967 (Fremont, Ohio)
- Running time: 80 minutes
- Country: United States
- Language: English
- Budget: $65,000

Spider Baby: or, the Maddest Story Ever Told is a 1967 American comedy horror film, written and directed by Jack Hill. It stars Lon Chaney Jr. as Bruno, the chauffeur and caretaker of three orphaned siblings who suffer from "Merrye Syndrome", a genetic condition starting in early puberty that causes them to regress mentally, socially and physically. Jill Banner, Carol Ohmart, Quinn Redeker, Beverly Washburn, Sid Haig, Mary Mitchel, Karl Schanzer and Mantan Moreland also star.

The film was shot between August and September 1964. However, due to the original producers' bankruptcy, the film was not released until December 24, 1967. The film was released to relative obscurity, but eventually achieved cult status.

== Plot ==
At the decaying Merrye House, feared by locals, the Merrye children Ralph, Virginia, and Elizabeth have lived in seclusion with the family chauffeur Bruno ever since their parents died. All three have advanced Merrye Syndrome, a genetic affliction unique to members of the family which causes them, starting in late childhood, to regress down the evolutionary ladder mentally and physically. They exhibit a playful innocence well before their years, mixed with feral madness.

Ralph is a sexually advanced, but mentally deficient simpleton who moves through the house via the dumb-waiter. Virginia is obsessed with spiders, and has more than once murdered visitors in a game of "spider", trapping them by rigging a window to snap shut on them, before hacking them to death with butcher knives. Elizabeth is regarded by Bruno as the most responsible of the three, but is also conniving and infatuated with the concept of hate. The children hold a steadfast respect and affection for Bruno, but increasingly disregard his admonitions against their darker impulses.

Virginia's latest victim is a delivery man serving notice that Peter Howe and his sister Emily, distant relatives of the Merrye family, are coming with their lawyer Schlocker and his secretary Ann, seeking to claim the property as rightful heirs. Bruno hastily coaches the children in enough social etiquette to pass muster before the visitors arrive. Schlocker is outraged that the children have been in the sole care of Bruno (who did not acquire legal guardianship) and have never attended school. Bruno tells him the children are intellectually disabled and resists the suggestion to put them in an institution, having sworn to their father to protect them for life. Emily and Schlocker insist on staying overnight to examine the situation, but with only two rooms available, Peter takes Ann into town to stay at an inn.

Schlocker investigates the house, going down to the basement, where he finds the Merrye patriarch's siblings are kept in a pit. Virginia and Elizabeth murder Schlocker to prevent him from reporting this discovery. Bruno realizes it will be impossible to keep this latest murder covered up, and leaves to fetch dynamite from a nearby construction site, planning to blow up the entire Merrye family rather than allow them to be confined. In his absence, Emily finds Schlocker's body as Virginia and Elizabeth are trying to dispose of it. The girls chase Emily out into the woods, where she is captured and raped by Ralph.

Finding no rooms available in town, Peter and Ann return to the mansion. Elizabeth, fearing the consequences if their crimes are discovered, escorts Ann to her room, leading her into the clutches of Ralph, while Virginia starts a game of "spider" with Peter, tying him to a chair and preparing to "sting" him with her knives. Elizabeth intervenes to ask for help with Ann, who is struggling against her and Ralph.

In the woods, Emily awakes traumatised and delirious. Sexually aggressive and murderous, she returns to the house and attacks Ralph while his sisters defend him. Meanwhile, Peter escapes his confinement and frees Ann. Bruno arrives with the dynamite and urges Peter to flee. Peter escorts Ann to safety as the house explodes behind them, killing Bruno and the Merrye family.

Peter, as the sole remaining heir, inherits the vast Merrye family fortune, marries Ann, and writes a book on the Merrye Syndrome phenomenon. His branch of the family, being rather distant, has never been afflicted by the syndrome. However, ten years later, while wandering outside, Peter and Ann's young daughter is fascinated by a spider, implying the early stages of the syndrome.

== Cast ==
- Lon Chaney Jr. as Bruno
- Jill Banner as Virginia Merrye
- Carol Ohmart as Emily Howe
- Quinn Redeker as Peter Howe
- Beverly Washburn as Elizabeth Merrye
- Sid Haig as Ralph Merrye
- Mary Mitchel as Anne Morris
- Karl Schanzer as Schlocker
- Mantan Moreland as Messenger
- Carolyn Cooper as Aunt Clara
- Joan Keller Stern as Aunt Martha
- Sidney Berger as Roadway worker

== Production ==
While working as a private investigator, Karl Schanzer mentioned to two of his clients, Gil Lasky and Paul Monka, that he was an out-of-work actor. Struck by the coincidence, they in turn told him that they were interested in producing a movie, and Schanzer pointed them towards director/screenwriter Jack Hill, who he had met in 1964 while Hill was working on Blood Bath. At the time Hill had not even the beginnings of a script for the film he wanted to make, but Lasky and Monka were impressed enough with his rough outline to green light the project.

Hill wrote the script with Lon Chaney Jr. in mind for the part of Bruno, but though Chaney read and liked the script, his agent said that the maximum fee the producers could offer for the film's lead role – $2,500 – was far too little for an actor of Chaney's prestige, especially since horror films were what he was most renowned for. However, when the producers later sent an inquiry as to whether John Carradine (who was represented by the same agent as Chaney) would be interested in the role, the agent wrote back saying that Chaney would accept the part for the offered $2,500.

Hill wanted Mantan Moreland for the part of the messenger because he believed that in light of Moreland being known for comedic roles, his character being brutally murdered would be a good opening shock to audiences.

The location chosen was the (now historic) Smith Estate in the Highland Park neighborhood of Los Angeles.

The film was shot between August and September 1964. However, due to the original producers' bankruptcy, the film was not released until December 24, 1967. Spider Baby suffered from poor marketing as well as a series of title changes, being billed alternatively as The Liver Eaters, Attack of the Liver Eaters, Cannibal Orgy, and The Maddest Story Ever Told. Although these alternate titles have little or no relation to the plot, the latter two appear in the opening narration by Chaney: "This cannibal orgy is strange to behold in the maddest story ever told." The opening titles of the film also dub it Spider Baby or, The Maddest Story Ever Told. Hill conceived the title The Maddest Story Ever Told as a play on the title of the then-recent film The Greatest Story Ever Told.

The cinematographer was Alfred Taylor, who had previously worked on the film The Atomic Brain. There was no power available in the Smith Estate when the opening scene was filmed, so Taylor arranged a series of reflectors to guide sunlight into the house and thereby provide lighting for the interior shots. The entire production cost about $65,000, and took only 12 days to shoot in black and white. The film was released as a double bill with Hell's Chosen Few.

== Release ==
Hill recalled those financing the film had a real estate business that went bankrupt, with the result that film was locked up in a vault for three years. A friend of his, David L. Hewitt had seen the film and kept track of it through all the litigation. Hewitt re-edited the film that Hill thought improved the film. Spider Baby first opened theatrically in Fremont, Ohio, as a double feature with Hewitt's The Wizard of Mars on December 8, 1967. It opened in Shreveport, Louisiana, the following week, on December 13, 1967.

=== Critical response ===
On Rotten Tomatoes, the film holds an approval rating of 88% based on 16 reviews, with a weighted average rating of 6.60/10. Metacritic, which uses a weighted average, assigned the film a score of 63 out of 100, based on 10 critics, indicating "generally favorable" reviews. Author and film critic Leonard Maltin awarded the film two and a half out of a possible four stars, saying, "At its best it's both scary and funny." Bruce G. Hallenbeck commented in his book Comedy-Horror Films: A Chronological History, 1914-2008 that "Spider Baby has a diseased, sickly atmosphere that anticipates that of David Lynch's Eraserhead (1976), with Alfred Taylor's black and white cinematography contributing images of death and decay that are still disturbing today." He particularly noted Lon Chaney, Jr.'s performance as being among the actor's best, portraying Bruno as a likable but misguided "enabler" for his wards.

=== Home media ===
In 1999, a DVD of the film's original laserdisc transfer was released, including a cast and crew reunion and a commentary track by Hill. In 2007, Dark Sky Films released a version featuring Hill's director's cut, a new commentary with co-star Haig and multiple documentaries on the making of the film. In 2015, British home video distributor Arrow Films released a director-approved Blu-ray/DVD combo special edition of the film.

== Legacy ==
In 2009, Spider Baby writer/director Hill and END Films launched the "official Spider Baby website", featuring historical information about the film, director/cast biographies, video clips and photo galleries.

=== Spider Baby The Musical ===
A rock and roll musical stage version of Spider Baby, directed by Helen Acosta, featured libretto and music by Enrique Acosta with lyrics by Enrique Acosta, Lorien Patton, and Helen Acosta. It was originally developed at Empty Space Theatre in Bakersfield in 2004 and had gone through several other developmental workshops. It played small community theaters, looking for a wider audience. It opened at the Empty Space theater in Bakersfield, California, on Halloween 2004. In October 2007, it opened in Brookings, Oregon, at the local Grange Hall, and in Orlando, Florida, at the Black Orchid Theater.

In 2009, the musical toured with stops in Fresno, Los Angeles, Bakersfield, Tehachapi and San Francisco. A 2010 multi-city tour had stops in Las Vegas, Toronto, and Los Angeles.

The musical played from October 15 to December 5, 2010 at The Lyric Hyperion Theatre Cafe in Silver Lake, Los Angeles.

In 2012, it played in San Diego, California, at the 10th Avenue Arts Centre as part of Gamercon and Terror at the 10th, respectively.

The soundtrack for the musical version was the final project at Buck Owens' recording studio in Bakersfield.

=== In music ===
The film's theme song has been covered at least three times: By the band Fantômas on their film-score covers album The Director's Cut, by crossover thrash band The Accüsed on 1988's Martha Splatterhead's Maddest Stories Ever Told as "The Maddest Story Ever Told", and by Kid Congo Powers.

In 2023, Waxwork Records released the soundtrack as part of the Rob Zombie Presents series. It was pressed on coloured vinyl and housed in special packaging featuring artwork by Graham Humphreys.

=== Remake ===
In 2007, independent film producer Tony DiDio began preparing a remake of the film, featuring original director Hill as executive producer, and Jeff Broadstreet as director.

Broadstreet stated in an interview, "We're going to stick very closely to the basic story of the original film, and at the same time dig deeper into the backstory of the inbred Merrye family." The new script by Robert Valding "expands on the themes of unconditional love, and also the story elements of cannibalism and the mutant relatives in the basement".

It was announced in 2023 that filmmaker Dustin Ferguson acquired the rights to Spider Baby and planned to produce a remake titled Spider Baby, or The Maddest Story Ever Told with Jack Hill as executive producer and starring Brinke Stevens, Beverly Washburn, and Robert Mukes. The remake premiered at the Frida Cinema in Santa Ana, CA on October 31, 2023.

== Preservation and archival status ==
In 2012, the film was preserved by the Academy Film Archive, using the original camera negative. A new fine grain master positive, new duplicate negative and new prints were created, as well as analog and digital soundtrack masters.
