= Don Hall (sound editor) =

American sound editor (1928–2025)

- Born: Donald Charles Hall Jr. July 10, 1928; Vallejo, California, U.S.
- Died: March 12, 2025 (aged 96)
- Occupation: Sound editor
- Years active: 1953–2025
- Spouse: Theodora Tang (m. 1951)
- Children: 1

Donald Charles Hall Jr. (July 10, 1928 – March 12, 2025) was an American sound editor. He won a British Academy Film Award and was nominated for two more in the category Best Soundtrack for the films Butch Cassidy and the Sundance Kid, M*A*S*H and Patton.

In addition to his British Academy Film Awards nominations, he won two Primetime Emmy Awards and was nominated for three more in the category Outstanding Sound Editing for his work on the television program Voyage to the Bottom of the Sea and also the television films Tribes, Eleanor and Franklin and Standing Tall.

In 2006, Hall was awarded the John A. Bonner Medal of Commendation by the Academy of Motion Picture Arts and Sciences.

Hall died on March 12, 2025, at the age of 96.

== Selected filmography ==
- Butch Cassidy and the Sundance Kid (1969; co-won with David Dockendorf and William Edmondson)
- M*A*S*H (1970; co-nominated with David Dockendorf and Bernard Freericks)
- Patton (1970; co-nominated with Douglas Williams and Don Bassman)
