= Waterloo (1970 film) =

1970 film by Sergei Bondarchuk

- Italian theatrical poster
- Directed by: Sergei Bondarchuk
- Screenplay by: H. A. L. Craig; Sergei Bondarchuk; Vittorio Bonicelli; Mario Soldati
- Story by: H. A. L. Craig
- Produced by: Dino De Laurentiis
- Starring: Rod Steiger; Christopher Plummer; Orson Welles; Jack Hawkins; Virginia McKenna; Dan O'Herlihy
- Cinematography: Armando Nannuzzi
- Edited by: Richard C. Meyer
- Music by: Nino Rota; Wilfred Josephs
- Production companies: Mosfilm; Dino de Laurentiis Cinematografica
- Distributed by: Paramount Pictures (Americas and Spain); Euro International Films (Italy); Mosfilm (USSR); Columbia Pictures (International)
- Release date: 26 October 1970
- Running time: 128 minutes
- Countries: Italy; Soviet Union
- Language: English
- Budget: £12 million ($25 million)

Waterloo (Russian: Ватерлоо) is a 1970 English-language epic historical war film about the Battle of Waterloo, the decisive battle of the Napoleonic Wars. A co-production between Italy and the Soviet Union, it was directed by Sergei Bondarchuk and produced by Dino De Laurentiis. It stars Rod Steiger as Napoleon Bonaparte and Christopher Plummer as the Duke of Wellington. Other stars include Jack Hawkins as General Sir Thomas Picton, Virginia McKenna as the Duchess of Richmond, Dan O'Herlihy as Marshal Ney, and Orson Welles as Louis XVIII of France.

The film is centered not just on the Battle of Waterloo, but also on the days that led to the campaign known as the Hundred Days. Steiger and Plummer often narrate sections in voice-over, presenting thoughts of Napoleon and Wellington.

The film is most famous for its lavish battle scenes, shot on-location in Uzhhorod, Ukraine (then the Ukrainian SSR). Its 17,000 authentically dressed extras, recreating battle scenes with true numbers and without special effects, remain the largest body of costumed extras in any film.

Despite mixed critical reviews, it won several awards, including BAFTAs for Best Costume Design and Best Art Direction, and the 1971 David di Donatello for Best Film.

== Plot ==
In the aftermath of the 1814 campaign, French Emperor Napoleon Bonaparte is forced to abdicate at the demand of his marshals. Exiled to Elba with 1,000 men, Napoleon makes his return to France after 10 months and in his march towards Paris, the French rally enthusiastically to his side. King Louis XVIII flees, and the European powers declare war once again. In Brussels during the Duchess of Richmond's ball, the Duke of Wellington is warned of Napoleon's march into Belgium, tactically driving a wedge between the British and Prussian armies. Wellington, in consulting with his staff, elects to halt Napoleon at Waterloo.

At Quatre-Bras, Marshal Ney fights the British to a draw, whereas Napoleon defeats the Prussians at Ligny. Ney rides to Napoleon to deliver his report, but in doing so has allowed Wellington to withdraw his still intact forces. Napoleon commands Grouchy to lead 30,000 men against the Prussians to prevent their rejoining the British, whilst Napoleon will command his remaining troops against Wellington.

On 18 June 1815, the Battle of Waterloo commences with initial cannon fire from the French. Napoleon launches teasing attacks against Wellington's flanks at Hougoumont and La Haye Sainte, though Wellington refuses to divert his main force. General Picton is sent to plug a gap when a Dutch brigade is routed, and though successful he is killed in doing so. Ponsonby also leads a cavalry charge against the French cannon but becomes isolated from the main allied force and is cut down by French lancers.

Troops spotted emerging from the east are worryingly assumed to be Grouchy by Wellington, and Blücher to Napoleon. Suffering from stomach pain, Napoleon momentarily withdraws and leaves Ney in command. Simultaneously, the order is given to allied troops to retire 100 paces, which Ney incorrectly interprets as a withdrawal.

Ney leads a cavalry charge against the British but is repelled with casualties by infantry squares. Despite this, the battle still wages much in Napoleon's favour; La Haye Sainte falls to the French, and Napoleon ultimately decides to send the Imperial Guard to deliver the decisive blow.

During their advance, Maitland's 1st Foot Guards, who were lying in tall grass, deliver a devastating point-blank volley against the Imperial Guard, repulsing them with heavy casualties. At the same time, Blücher arrives in the field. For the first time in its history the Imperial Guard breaks, and the battle is won by the Allied forces.

That evening after the battle, Wellington is seen observing the thousands of casualties on the field. Napoleon, having survived the battle, is urged to flee at the pleas of his marshals.

== Cast ==
=== The French and allies ===
- Rod Steiger as Emperor Napoleon I
- Dan O'Herlihy as Marshal Michel Ney
- Philippe Forquet as Brigadier-General Charles de la Bédoyère
- Gianni Garko as Major-General Antoine Drouot
- Ivo Garrani as Marshal Nicolas Jean-de-Dieu Soult
- Charles Millot as Marshal Emmanuel de Grouchy, Marquis de Grouchy
- Yevgeny Samoylov as Brigadier-General Pierre Cambronne
- Vladimir Druzhnikov as Général de Division Étienne Maurice Gérard
- Andrea Checchi as Old Guardsman
- Orazio Orlando as Constant
- Gennadi Yudin as Grenadier Chactas
- Armando Bottin as Sous-Lieutenant Legros
- Rodolfo Lodi as Joseph Fouché
- Jean Louis as Marshal Nicolas Oudinot
- Boris Molchanov as Général de Division Henri Gatien Bertrand
- Lev Polyakov as Général de Division François Étienne de Kellermann
- Giorgio Sciolette as Marshal Louis-Alexandre Berthier
- Sergio Testori as Lieutenant-General Marcellin Marbot
- Yan Yanakiyev as Dr. Dominique Jean Larrey
- Rostislav Yankovsky as Charles Joseph de Flahaut

=== The British and allies ===
- Christopher Plummer as Field Marshal Arthur Wellesley, 1st Duke of Wellington
- Orson Welles as King Louis XVIII of France
- Jack Hawkins as Lieutenant-General Sir Thomas Picton (voice dubbed by Robert Rietti, as Hawkins had lost his voice to throat cancer)
- Virginia McKenna as Charlotte Lennox, Duchess of Richmond
- Rupert Davies as Colonel Alexander Gordon, 4th Duke of Gordon
- Ian Ogilvy as Colonel Sir William Howe De Lancey
- Michael Wilding as Major-General The Honourable Sir William Ponsonby
- Sergo Zakariadze as Field Marshal Gebhard von Blücher, Fürst von Wahlstatt
- Terence Alexander as Lieutenant-General Henry Paget, 2nd Earl of Uxbridge
- Donal Donnelly as Corporal O'Connor
- Oleg Vidov as Tomlinson
- Charles Borromel as Mulholland
- Peter Davies as Ensign James Hay, Lord Hay
- Veronica De Laurentiis as Magdalene De Lancey
- Willoughby Gray as Major William Ramsay
- Roger Green as Duncan
- Richard Heffer as Captain Cavalié Mercer
- John Savident as Major-General Karl Freiherr von Müffling
- Jeffry Wickham as Colonel Sir John Colborne
- Susan Wood as Lady Sarah Lennox
- Andrea Esterhazy as Charles Lennox, 4th Duke of Richmond
- Karl Lyepinsk as Generalfeldmarschall August Neidhardt von Gneisenau

== Production ==
=== Development ===
Italian producer De Laurentiis first announced the film in October 1965, saying it would be made the following year. John Huston was set to direct. With John Huston on board, De Laurentiis attempted to secure international co-production deals in Eastern Europe, but negotiations did not succeed.

It was not until De Laurentiis began talks with the Soviets in the late 1960s, that he found the financing he was looking for. He reached an agreement with Mosfilm, in which final costs were more than £12 million (GBP) (equivalent to about U.S. $38.3 million in 1970), making it one of the most expensive movies made, for its time. The movie was one of several co-productions between Italy and Russia around this time. Others include The Red Tent, Sunflower and Dubrovsky (the latter was never made). Additional financing also came from Paramount and Columbia.

By this point, John Huston had left the project. The connection also led to the involvement of Russian director Sergei Bondarchuk, whose previous work included the four-hour film War and Peace, which won the Academy Award for Best Foreign Language Film at the 1970 Academy Awards.

Had the movie been filmed in the West, it might have cost up to three times as much. Mosfilm contributed more than £4 million of the costs, and nearly 17,000 soldiers of the Soviet Army, including a full brigade of Soviet cavalry, and a host of engineers and labourers to prepare the battlefield in the rolling farmland outside Uzhhorod. The Italians reportedly provided eight million pounds.

=== Casting ===
In December 1968, Steiger had been cast as Napoleon, and Bondarchuk visited London to talk to actors about playing the Duke of Wellington. "I see Wellington as a typical Englishman," said the director, adding "I see Napoleon as Tolstoy treated him." Several historical characters listed in the credits do not actually appear in the film, they are said to have been in scenes cut before release. The English actor Robert Rietti, who had experience in doing voice-overs, did the voices for 98 individual characters in the movie. This included the voice-over for British actor Jack Hawkins (as General Sir Thomas Picton) who had lost his voice due to throat cancer in 1965.

=== Filming ===
Filming took place in Rome and the Ukrainian SSR throughout 1969. To recreate the battlefield "authentically", the Soviets bulldozed away two hills, laid 8 kilometres of roads, transplanted 5,000 trees, sowed fields of rye, barley and wildflowers and reconstructed four historic buildings. To create the mud, more than 10 kilometres of underground irrigation piping was specially laid. Most of the battle scenes were filmed using five Panavision cameras simultaneously – from ground level, from 100-foot towers, from a helicopter, and from an overhead railway built right across the location. The battle reportedly cost $5 million of the $25 million budget. It was the largest battlefield ever used for a film.

However, the authentic nature of the topography is questionable and has more to do with dramatic panoramic film shots rather than topographical accuracy: in reality, the Waterloo site is laid out as a series of low hillocks with few opportunities for long views. In particular, La Haye Sainte is almost invisible from the north and west, sitting in a small south-facing hollow.

Actual filming was accomplished over 28 weeks, which included 16 days of delay (principally due to bad weather). Many of the battle scenes were filmed in the summer of 1969 in often sweltering heat. In addition to the battlefield in Ukraine, filming also took place on location in the Royal Palace of Caserta, Italy, while interior scenes were filmed on the large De Laurentiis Studios lot in Rome. The battle sequences of the film included 17,000 extras with 15,000 Soviet foot soldiers and 2,000 cavalrymen. Fifty circus stunt riders were also used to perform the dangerous horse falls. It has been joked that Sergei Bondarchuk was in command of the seventh-largest army in the world.

Months before the cameras started filming, the 17,000 extras began training to learn drill and battle formations, as well as the use of sabres, bayonets and handling cannons. A selected 2,000 men were also taught to load and fire muskets. This army lived in a large encampment next to the battlefield.

The soldiers were commanded by officers who took orders from director Sergei Bondarchuk via walkie-talkie. To assist in the direction of this multi-national undertaking, the Soviet director had four interpreters permanently at his side: one each for English, Italian, French and Serbo-Croatian.

=== Music ===
A large part of the music was composed by Nino Rota. However, he also incorporated a lot of music from that time. For example, he included "La Victoire est à Nous" into "Onto Brussels" which is played during the old guard advance. Another example is "The Girl I Left Behind" used in "The Old Guard is Broken!".

== Reception ==
=== Box office ===
It was the fifth most popular "reserve ticket" movie at the British box office in 1971. Associate producer Tom Carlie said "the film has been well received in Europe especially England. The French are less enthusiastic, but after all they lost at Waterloo."

However, it failed to recoup its cost. The meagre box office results of Waterloo led to the cancellation of Stanley Kubrick's planned film biography of Napoleon.

After its release, the film gained popularity and received numerous positive reviews for its battle depiction. New Zealand film director Peter Jackson said that the film inspired his adaptations of The Lord of the Rings and The Hobbit.

=== Critical response ===
On the review aggregator website Rotten Tomatoes, 27% of 10 critics' reviews are positive. Roger Ebert, writing for the Chicago Sun-Times said "Bondarchuk is so overwhelmed by the thousands of Russian cavalry troops he's been given to play with, and by his $25 million budget, and by his obsession for aerial photography, that his leading characters turn out scarcely more human than his extras." Tony Mastroianni of the Cleveland Press wrote, "Waterloo is solid, sometimes to the point of lumbering... But Waterloo succeeds in what it set out to do - to re-create a major historical event and place it in some kind of perspective."

Writing in The New York Times, Roger Greenspun called Waterloo "a very bad movie," citing Bondarchuk's "obsessive" directing and Steiger's overacting:

Steiger plays a peace-loving Napoleon, crafty, tired, much weighted with the destiny he seems never to get off his mind. Like a Willy Loman not wholly aware that he has lost his territory, he alternately schemes and complains -— as if, in addition to all his other achievements, he had discovered at Waterloo the sources of theatrical naturalism. It is an awful performance, and every mannered point of it is emphasized by the elephantine selectivity of Bondarchuk's camera -— narrowing upon the eyes, a weary fold of flesh, the carefully hunched back, the hat, the pudgy man's walk. During the first parts of "Waterloo," when Napoleon is much in view, I thought that no director, not even Bondarchuk, merited Steiger's performance. Later, in the heat of the battle, I felt that not even Steiger need have suffered through Bondarchuk's direction. But now critical calm has put all things in perspective, and I realize that they richly deserved each other.

=== Awards and nominations ===
Award	Category	Nominee	Result
British Academy Film Award	Best Cinematography	Armando Nannuzzi	Nominated
British Academy Film Award	Best Costume Design	Maria De Matteis	Won
British Academy Film Award	Best Art Direction	Mario Garbuglia	Won
David di Donatello	Best Film	Dino De Laurentiis	Won (Note: Tied with The Garden of the Finzi-Continis and The Conformist)
Nastro d'Argento	Best Cinematography	Armando Nannuzzi	Nominated

== Home media ==
Waterloo was first released on VHS in 1996 in the United Kingdom by Columbia TriStar Home Video and it was released again on DVD in 1999. It was also released again on Blu-ray in 2021. The United States, however, it was only released on VHS by Paramount Home Video in 1991. Neither the DVD or Blu-Ray versions were released in the United States for a period of time.

The film was also novelised by Frederick E. Smith, with the content based on the screenplay.

== Notes ==
- Paul Davies, The Field of Waterloo (Pan Books, 1970) - "a profusely illustrated, graphic companion to the people, places and events depicted in WATERLOO - the spectacular Dino De Laurentiis production" ISBN 0-330-02601-1
