= Jill Banner =

American actress (1946–1982)

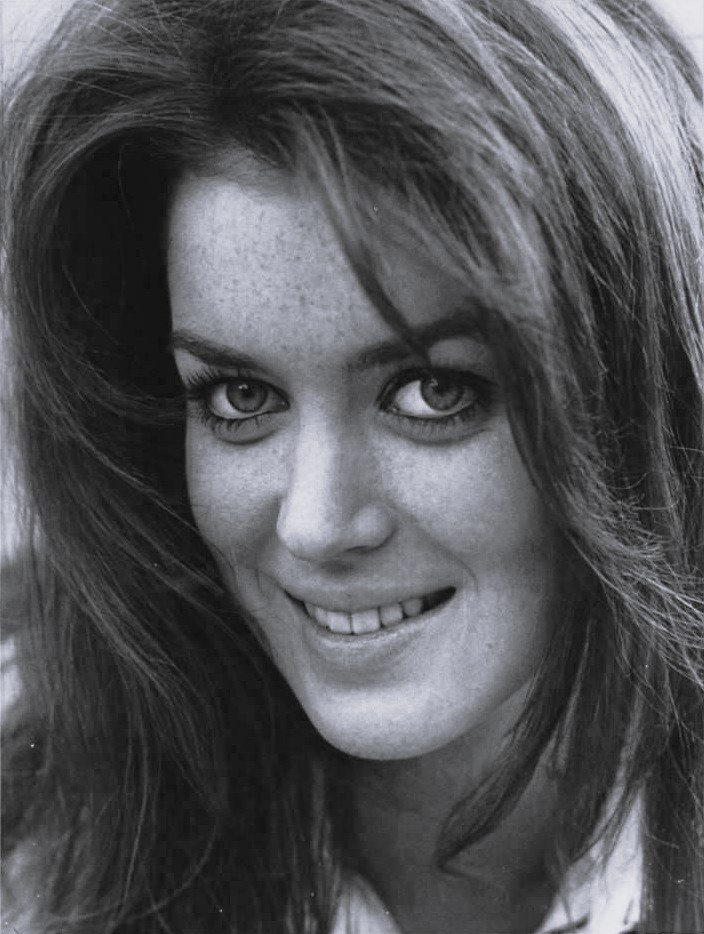
- Banner in The Name of The Game (1970)
- Born: Mary Kathryn Molumby; November 8, 1946; Bremerton, Washington, U.S.
- Died: August 7, 1982 (aged 35); North Hollywood, California, U.S.
- Resting place: Valhalla Memorial Park
- Occupation: Actress
- Years active: 1966–1972
- Partner: Marlon Brando (1968–1982)

Jill Banner (born Mary Kathryn Molumby; November 8, 1946 – August 7, 1982) was an American film actress. She played Virginia, the "spider baby" in the 1967 cult horror-comedy film Spider Baby. She also had roles as James Coburn's flower child friend in The President's Analyst (1967), and appearances in Jack Webb's television series, Dragnet.

== Early life ==
Banner was born in Bremerton, Washington. After her father's death in 1949 and her baby brother Edward given up for adoption, she and her mother lived in South Dakota and Iowa, near relatives, finally ending up in Glendale, California. She studied at the Hollywood Professional School, a K-12 school for working professional children run by Maurice and Bertha Mann, where classes typically ran from 8:45 AM to 12:45 PM, allowing the students the afternoon off to pursue various jobs or performing careers. The school assemblies, called "Aud. Calls", were early showcases for the talents of students aspiring to be dancers, singers, and actors. She graduated in 1964.

== Film and television ==
Banner's film acting began in 1964 with Spider Baby, also starring Sid Haig and Lon Chaney Jr. and directed by Jack Hill. However, the film was tied up in litigation and was not released until 1967 under various titles, including Attack of the Liver Eaters, Cannibal Orgy, and The Maddest Story Ever Told. The black and white feature quickly faded from view. Spider Baby became known largely through the efforts of Los Angeles cult film resurrectionist Johnny Legend. The film tells the story of the Merrye family, who suffer from a degenerative disease. While Spider Baby remained in legal limbo, Banner was uncredited in Deadlier Than the Male (1966), a British mystery about two female assassins. In 1967, she played Wendy, a wholesome teenager, in C'mon, Let's Live a Little, one of the last of the Beach party films, and as Caroline in the Spaghetti Western The Stranger Returns.

In the psychedelically paranoid spy spoof The President's Analyst (1967), Banner played a flower child named "Snow White" who temporarily rescues Dr. Sidney Schaefer from a combined conspiracy of the American CIA, the Russian KGB, and The Phone Company (referred to cryptically as "TPC"). She was featured in several episodes of Jack Webb's police-procedural shows, Dragnet and Adam-12, usually playing clueless teenagers and spaced-out daytrippers.

Banner performed in several movies and TV shows in the late 1960s and early 1970s, including Shadow Over Elveron (1968) with Don Ameche and Adam-12 co-star Kent McCord. In The Stranger Returns (also known as Shoot First Laugh Last and Un Uomo, Un Cavallo, Una Pistola), Banner played the pretty daughter of a corrupt postal official who falls into the hands of banditos, only to be rescued by The Stranger. She was also featured in Hunters Are For Killing (1970), an early Burt Reynolds movie. She later appeared in episodes of the television shows The Bold Ones and Cade's County. She had an uncredited bit part in Christian Marquand's 1968 film Candy, but her scene was deleted from the final print.

== Later years ==
Banner abandoned Hollywood for a real estate job in New Mexico in 1976. Marlon Brando's 1994 autobiography, Songs My Mother Taught Me, discusses the couple's relationship. Banner returned to Southern California in the early 1980s, reportedly to develop scripts.

== Death ==
On August 7, 1982, Banner's Toyota was hit by a truck on the Ventura Freeway. Thrown from the vehicle, she later died at North Hollywood's Riverside Hospital. She was 35 years old. She is interred at Valhalla Memorial Park Cemetery.

== Sources ==
- Higham, Charles (1988). Brando: The Unauthorized Biography. New York: New American Library. ISBN 0-451-15394-4.
- Lipton, Peggy (2005). Breathing Out. New York: St. Martin's Press. ISBN 978-0312324131.
