= Daniel Selznick =

American film and television producer (1936–2024)

- Born: May 18, 1936
- Died: August 1, 2024 (aged 88); Los Angeles, California, U.S.
- Education: Harvard College (BA)
- Occupations: Film and television producer
- Spouse(s): Joan Keller (1972–1976); Katharine Delano Ryan (2003–2015); Susan Warms Dryfoos (1989–?)
- Parent(s): David O. Selznick; Irene Mayer Selznick

Daniel Selznick (May 18, 1936 – August 1, 2024) was an American film and television producer.

Selznick came from a famous Hollywood family: he was the son of producer David O. Selznick and his wife Irene Mayer Selznick, and the grandson of producers Louis B. Mayer and Lewis J. Selznick.

In his career, Daniel Selznick produced Blood Feud, The Making of a Legend: Gone with the Wind, Hoover vs. The Kennedys, and Night Terror. Selznick died in Woodland Hills, Los Angeles, on August 1, 2024, at the age of 88.
