= Before the Mountain Was Moved =

1970 film

- Directed by: Robert K. Sharpe
- Written by: Robert K. Sharpe
- Produced by: Robert K. Sharpe
- Starring: Ellis Bailey
- Narrated by: Ellis Bailey
- Cinematography: Michael Livesy
- Edited by: Nick Masci
- Music by: Jess Soraci
- Distributed by: Office of Economic Opportunity
- Release date: March 1970
- Running time: 60 minutes
- Country: United States
- Language: English

Before the Mountain Was Moved is a 1970 American documentary film produced by Robert K. Sharpe. The film portrays the struggle by the inhabitants of Raleigh County, West Virginia, to preserve their land from the ravages of strip-mining, and their efforts to pass state legislation to this end. It was nominated for an Academy Award for Best Documentary Feature.

== Synopsis ==
=== Part I ===
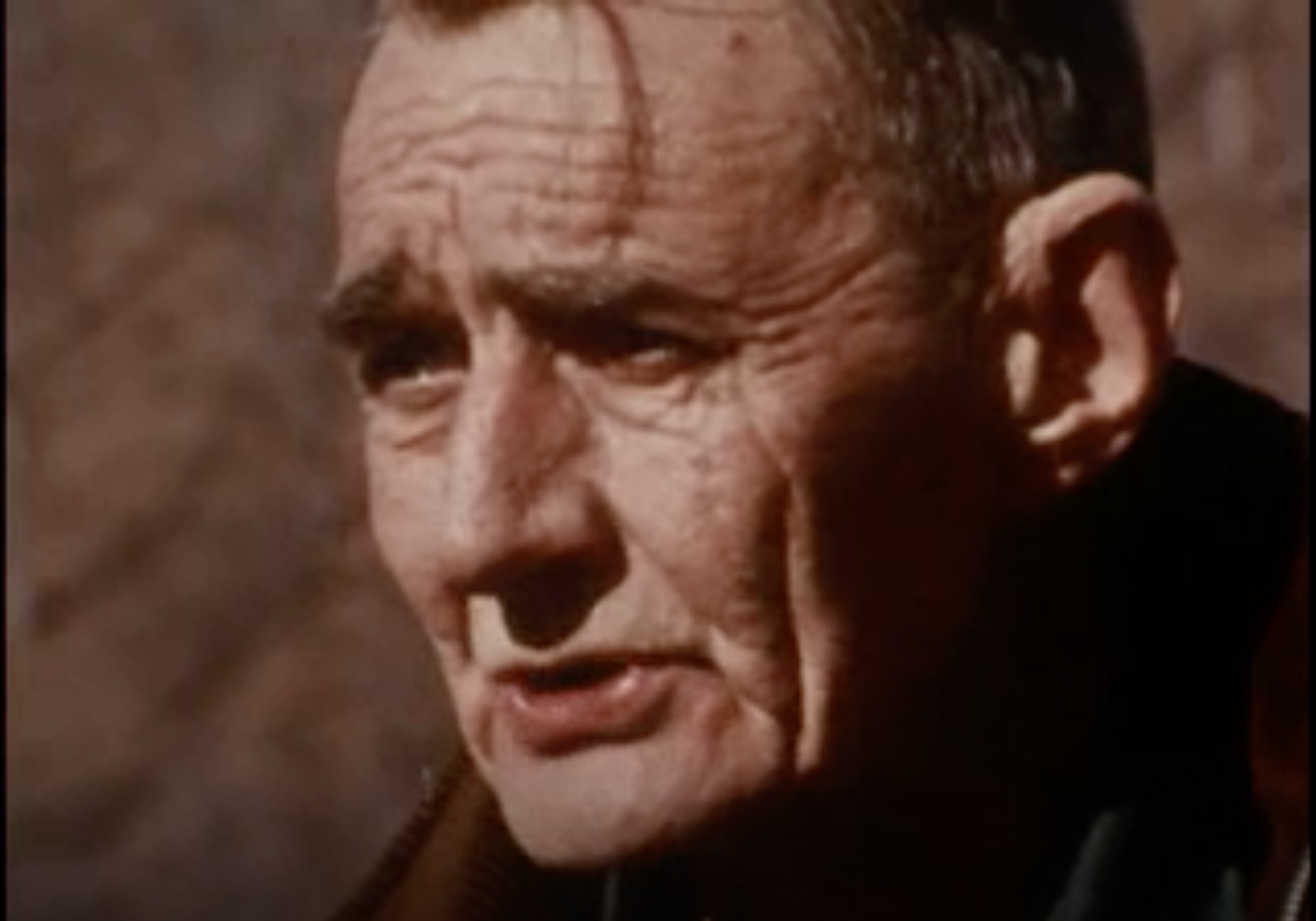
Ellis Bailey of Raleigh County, West Virginia speaks in the documentary.

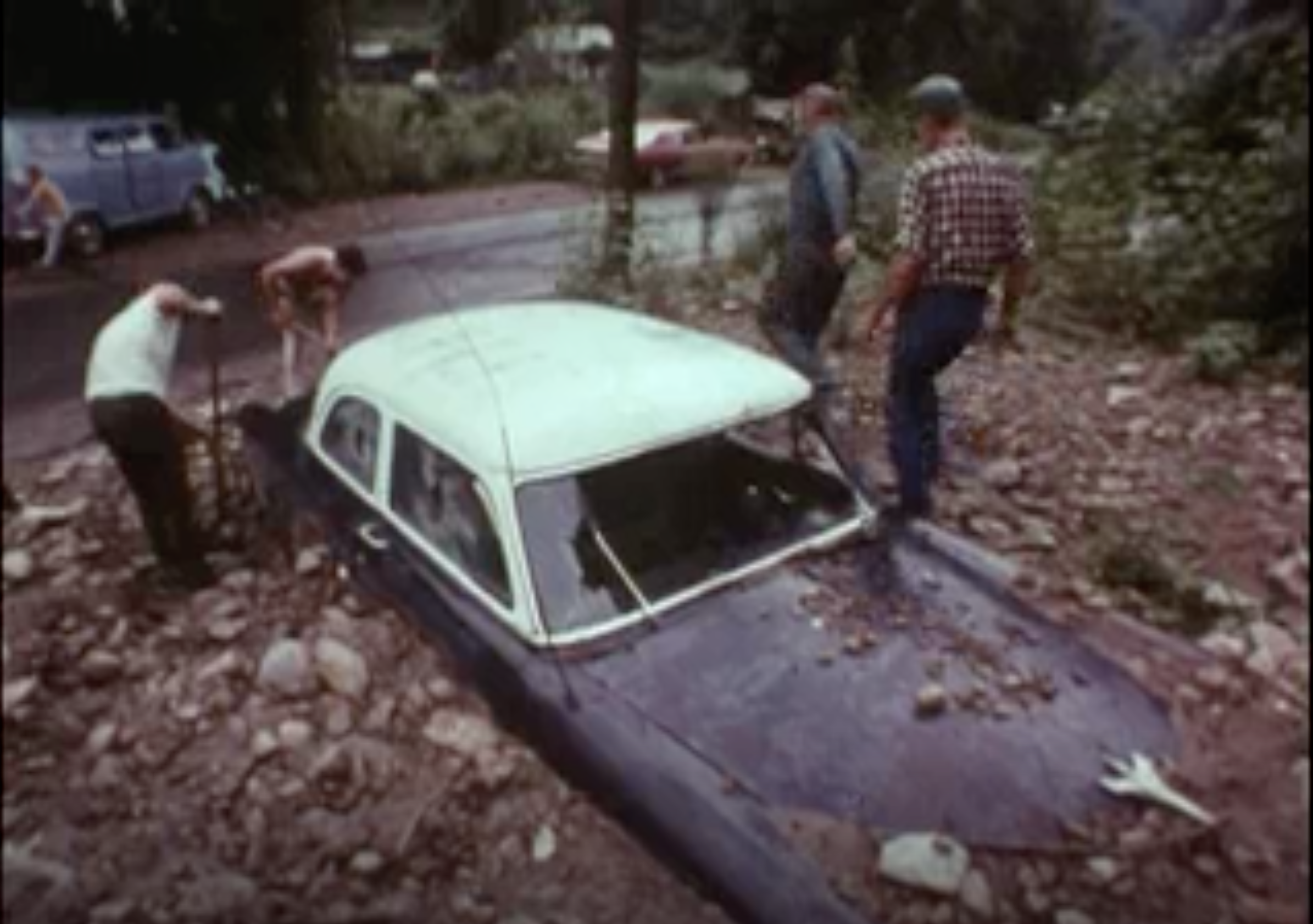
Ellis Bailey unearths his buried car.

The film depicts mountaineers Ellis Bailey and Ellen Bailey of Clear Fork, West Virginia shoveling landslide debris off of their porch and car. Their house appears to have been covered in mud after rain, allegedly provoked by under-regulated mountaintop removal mining and deforestation. A member of the Raleigh County Community Action Association arrives at the Bailey's house to invite them to a community meeting about the strip-miners, or "strippers". Both of the Baileys express doubt that anything can be done for them. Ellen Bailey tells the associate that "most of the working men are working at the mines... they're afraid to do something that will interfere with their jobs." Ellis Bailey expresses that "I can't fight a big coal company, he's got too much money." However, they decide to attend the meeting. Resident Byrd Hendrix overlooks a stream and describes the collapse of minnow and Crayfish populations. Community members are upset when one "stripper" claims that the landslides were an Act of God. At the Clear Fork Community Action Center, West Virginian State Senator and former strip-miner Tracy Hilton (credited as Tracy Hylton) speaks about strip-miners. He claims that the current requirement for obtaining strip-mining license is a $10 fee, and includes little to no regulation. Some residents express their discontent at the current laws, and at Hilton's lack of guidance. A group of residents travels to Charleston, West Virginia to speak to state senators at the West Virginia State Capitol.

=== Part II ===
The residents arrive at the West Virginia State Capitol. They have arrived to contribute to discussion on West Virginian Senate bill 61, the "Strip Mining Bill". Before entering the building, they express to each other the need to work together and be persistent. They also express fear at being "laughed at". They speak briefly to Paul Kaufman, former State Senator of West Virginia. While gathered in the hallway, they are told of the need to register to speak to the gathered lawmakers. The residents express concern about speaking to the large group, and argue about who will speak. In the end, they select ex-Sergeant Major of the Army Clarendon Williams, school teacher Ina Mae Painter, and mountaineer Ellis Bailey to speak to the lawmakers. Beforehand, Painter helps Bailey create notes about what to say, and assuages his fears. In the end, Bailey delivers the following testimony to the legislators in the documentary:

"Well, my name is Ellis Bailey. I was selected by a group of the strippers been damaged, of Clear Fork in Raleigh County. I'm not an educated man, don't know how to speak much, but I'm here to state the facts of what's happening in Raleigh County of West Virginia. I've been had by the strippers. I have 65 acres of land. This land is almost washed away. The ponds washed full of water, my cattle've nowhere to drink. Well, it seem like I'm gonna have to sell the cattle at a great loss. The fences, I'll never be able, as old as I am and broke down, to fix back. So I'm at an awful loss to the stripper, and it don't seem like I've got it much of a fix. Our roads are rot in our area, our hollows are filled up, our creek beds are filled up, our wildlife, our fish. It's impossible to go fishing and catch any fish in our area. If I get to go fishing, I have to leave our county. Which I don't get to fishing much more, I don't have the money to take these trips. I don't get to enjoy life like I used to enjoy life. And the very thing that brought this all in the area is the stripper. He has damaged our water, our land, our forest. To a poor man has not got the right that he has had. Every man should have his own right, but the poor man's right is being destroyed right today. And the strip mine has done more to destroy the poor class of people than anything that's ever hit our area."

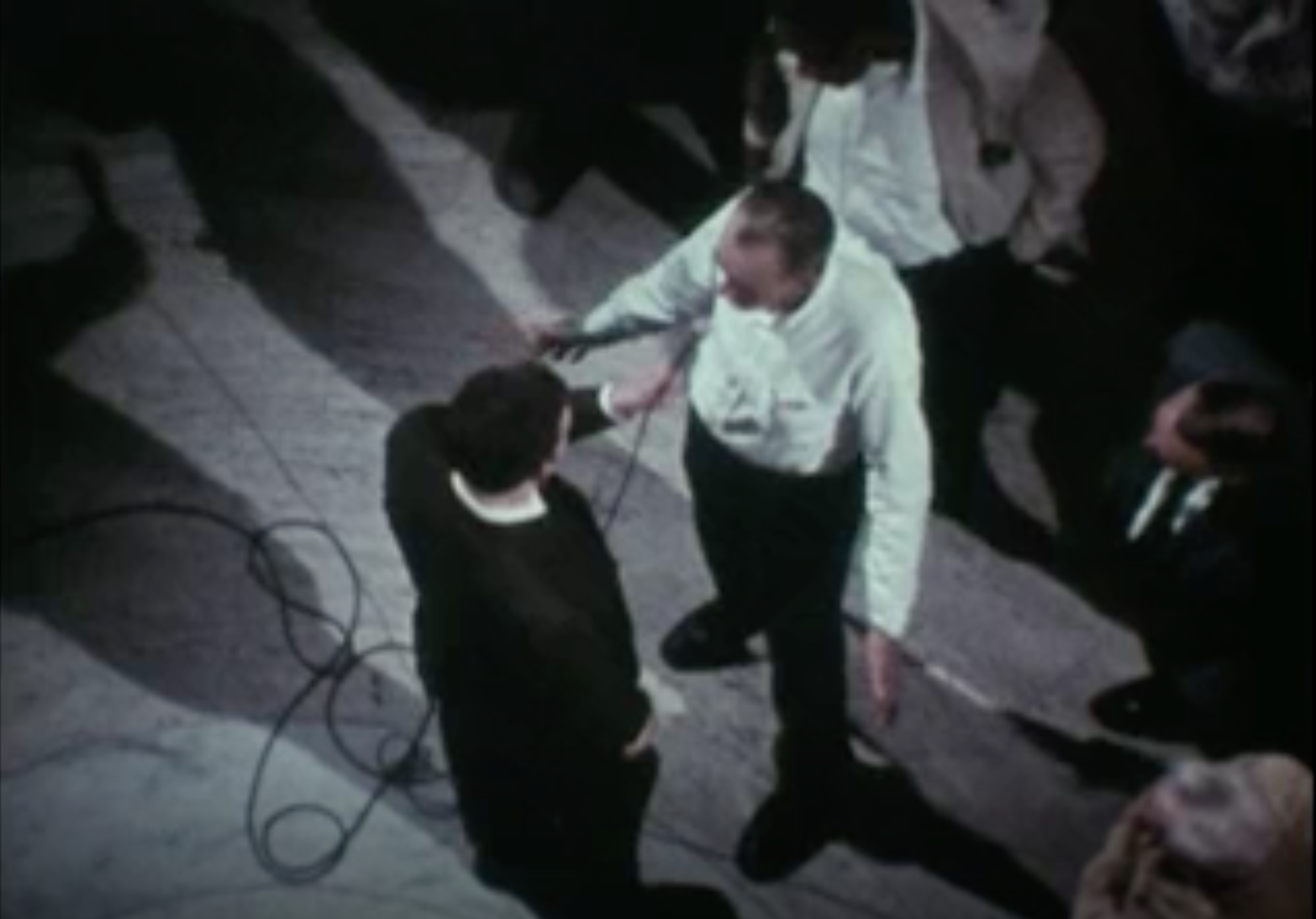
Ellis Bailey speaks to a reporter in the 1970 documentary film "Before the Mountain Was Moved".

The residents give a presentation in the state capitol demonstrating the effects of the landslides on their community. They also mention methods of mountaintop restoration, including aerial seeding. However, one affected resident concedes that they "can never put it back like it originally was."

The residents return home to Raleigh County, where they listen to the radio and watch television to learn updates about the bill. Due to heavy rains, the roads in Raleigh County become impassable, and they are unable to travel to the capitol again. The bill was passed unanimously by the West Virginian Senate, but "emerged from the House in a watered-down condition." However, in the end, the bill is passed in its original, harder-regulation form in a 98-to-1 landslide as the 1967 West Virginia Surface Mining Reclamation Act. The residents celebrate upon hearing the news.

== Cast ==
- Ellis Bailey, mountaineer and narrator
- Ellen Bailey, woman around fire
- David Biesmeyer, Community Action Worker and AmeriCorps VISTA volunteer
- Ernest and Virginia Bonds, disabled miner and wife
- Thurston Hariston
- Byrd Hendrix, man by stream
- Tracy Hilton (credited as Tracy Hylton), former State Senator of West Virginia
- Paul Kaufman, former State Senator of West Virginia
- Robert Kincaid as "Stripper"
- Ina Mae Painter, school teacher
- Prof. Jack Robinson, Community Action speaker
- Naomi Weintraub (also Naomi Cohen), Community Action Worker and AmeriCorps VISTA volunteer
- Clarendon Williams, ex-army sergeant
- Dick Yanantuono, Community Action Worker

== Awards and nominations ==
The film was nominated for an Academy Award for Best Documentary Feature at the 42nd Academy Awards.

== See also ==
- Appalachian Volunteers
- AmeriCorps VISTA
- Surface mining reclamation in West Virginia
- Surface Mining Control and Reclamation Act of 1977
- Office of Economic Opportunity
