= Robert K. Sharpe =

American TV and film director (1930–2016)

Robert K. Sharpe (1930 – 2016) was an American TV and film director, who produced the film Before the Mountain Was Moved, which was nominated for as Best Documentary Feature in the 1970 Academy Awards.

== Biography ==
Sharpe was born in Chicago, Illinois, and graduated Phi Beta Kappa with a B.A. in writing from Brown University. Sharpe served as a writer and director for films at CBS The Twentieth Century series with Walter Cronkite. He also worked as director for NBC Special Projects, including an adaptation of E.B. White's "Here is New York" for The Seven Lively Arts with John Houseman and Andy Rooney, and Omnibus with Alistair Cooke. He served on the executive board of the Screen Directors International Guild, along with Shirley Clarke, Leo Hurwitz, and Willard Van Dyke, among others, in the late 1950s and early 1960s.

Before the Mountain Was Moved was distributed by the Office of Economic Opportunity about the devastation that strip-mining inflicted on people's lives in Appalachia. The film was based on the story of the VISTA volunteers who came to work along Coal River in West Virginia in 1966–1967. Excerpts of the film were included in "Voices from the Sixties," a four-part radio documentary funded by the Humanities Foundation of West Virginia, which was written and produced by Gibbs Kinderman in 1987.

== Filmography ==
- Here is New York, 1957, as director, shot on 127 locations throughout the city
- Light--as you like it, 1959, as director, commissioned for Superior Electric Co to show the latest styles and designs for home lighting
- The Forgotten, 1959, as director, documentary about Chicago slums
- The Long Night, as director, based on Julian Mayfield's 1958 novel of the same name
- A Night in the Pet Shop, 1961, as writer and director, documentary short, shot on location in a New York pet shop after the proprietor locks up
- Keep It Cool, 1963, as director, on the YMCA Detached Worker program in Chicago
- The Twentieth Century
  - 1961: Season 5/Episode 9: The Jazz of Dave Brubeck
  - 1963: S6/E18: Rhodes Scholar
  - 1963: S7/E1: Keep It Cool
- Wisdom – A Conversation with Andres Segovia, 1962
- The Ordeal of Woodrow Wilson — A Personal Memoir by Herbert Hoover, 1962, as director, for NBC Special Projects, narrated by Herbert Hoover
- To Live and Learn, 1963, for USIA
- Joe, 1964, produced for the US Information Agency about a skilled factory worker, who receives retirement assistance from federal program
- The Great Debates – Lincoln vs. Douglas, 1965, starring Hal Holbrook as Lincoln
- Volunteers for Head Start, 1966, produced for the Office of Economic Opportunity, Head Start program
- Pancho, 1967, produced for the Office of Economic Opportunity, documentary short, follows the development of a young boy due to Head Start program
- Before the Mountain Was Moved, 1970, as writer, producer, and director
