= Robert Martin (sound engineer) =

American audio engineer (1916–1992)

- Born: March 31, 1916; Pennsylvania, USA
- Died: January 16, 1992 (aged 75); San Luis Obispo, California, USA
- Occupation: audio engineer
- Years active: 1960 – 1976

Robert Martin (March 31, 1916 – January 16, 1992) was an American audio engineer. He was nominated for an Academy Award in the category Sound Recording for the film Gaily, Gaily.

== Selected filmography ==
- Gaily, Gaily (1969)
