= Gaily, Gaily =

1969 film

- Film poster
- Directed by: Norman Jewison
- Screenplay by: Abram S. Ginnes
- Based on: novel by Ben Hecht
- Produced by: Norman Jewison
- Starring: Beau Bridges; Brian Keith; George Kennedy; Hume Cronyn; Melina Mercouri
- Cinematography: Richard H. Kline
- Edited by: Byron W. Brandt; Ralph E. Winters
- Music by: Henry Mancini
- Production company: The Mirisch Corporation
- Distributed by: United Artists
- Release date: December 16, 1969; (New York City)
- Running time: 107 minutes
- Country: United States
- Language: English
- Budget: $9 million
- Box office: $1 million (domestic rentals)

Gaily, Gaily (released in the United Kingdom as Chicago, Chicago) is a 1969 American comedy film directed by Norman Jewison. It is a fictionalized adaptation of a 1963 memoir of the same name by Ben Hecht and stars Beau Bridges, Brian Keith, George Kennedy, Hume Cronyn and Melina Mercouri.

The film featured two songs sung by Mercouri with lyrics by Alan and Marilyn Bergman set to Henry Mancini's music.

== Plot ==
Set in 1910, the film's main character is Ben Harvey (patterned after Ben Hecht): serious about seeing the world, he leaves his home in Galena, Illinois for Chicago, where he meets a woman named Lil, who in reality is the madam of the bordello Ben mistakes for a boarding house. He also is friendly with Adeline, one of the prostitutes. While he tries to find work, Ben encounters other people, including a hard drinking reporter named Sullivan, plus two other men, Grogan and Johanson, who are involved in shady doings in city government. Suspecting corruption, both Harvey and Sullivan decide to investigate.

== Cast ==
- Beau Bridges as Ben Harvey
- Melina Mercouri as Lilan
- Brian Keith as Sullivan
- George Kennedy as Johanson
- Hume Cronyn as Grogan
- Margot Kidder as Adeline
- Roy Poole as Dunne
- Wilfrid Hyde-White as The Governor
- Melodie Johnson as Lilah Letterby
- John Randolph as Father
- Charles Tyner as Dr. Lazarus
- Joan Huntington as Kitty
- Merie Earle as Granny
- Claudia Bryar as Mother
- Eric Shea as Younger Brother

== Production ==
For the past ten days, Jewison and a large camera crew have been shooting the Chicago Hecht, must have known: the B&O station, Lincoln Park, streets on the Near North Side, and the Auditorium Theater....This week, the company moves to Milwaukee. “They have streets there that still look more like Chicago than anything left here,” Jewison said. Then they will go to Galena, on the Mississippi River..."(Norman Jewison)..."We had a devil of a time finding a house for George Kennedy...Finally, we found the perfect place: perfect in every detail except one...Turned out Cardinal Cody lives there."(Norman Jewison) - Roger Ebert

Director Norman Jewison wanted to film on location in Chicago, but found the city too modern for the film's setting: "Chicago has some nice, old streets, but behind every one of them there’s a 70 story skyscraper," he said. Exteriors instead were shot in Milwaukee, where modern skyscrapers were less prevalent, during June and July 1968.

The North American title comes from a poem by the Canadian poet, Bliss Carman: "Oh but life went gayly, gayly,/In the house of Idiedaily!/There were always throats to sing/Down the riverbanks with spring."

== Reception ==
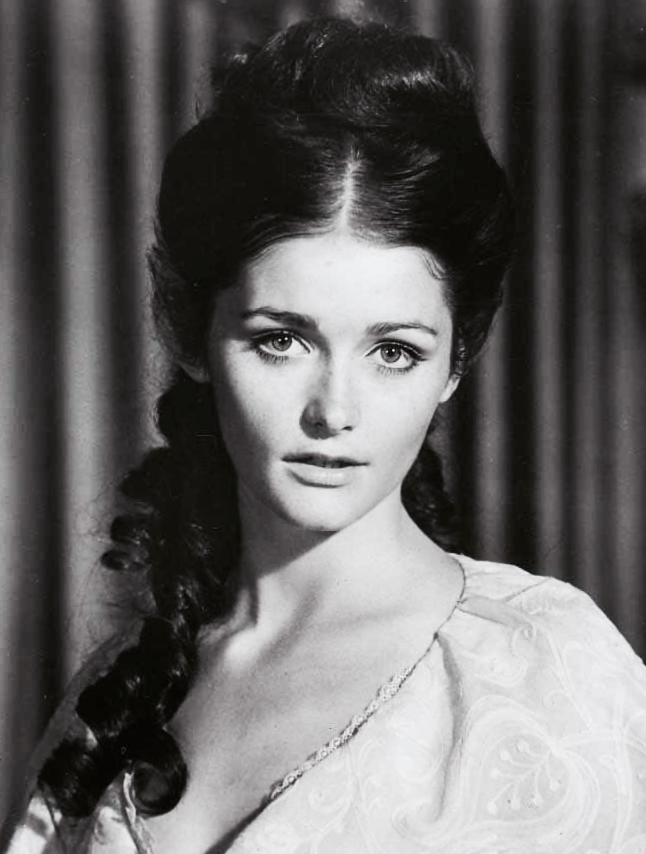
Margot Kidder as the prostitute Adeline

The film holds a score of 60% on Rotten Tomatoes based on 5 reviews.

Vincent Canby of The New York Times called it "a movie of great and exuberant charm, one that pays homage to the classic conventions of American farce by defining them with nostalgia and cinematic wit." Variety declared it "a lushly staged, handsomely produced, largely unfunny comedy. There are a few bright spots, and a certain segment of the audience may find the film amusing, naughty and risque." Pauline Kael of The New Yorker wrote, "A good subject, a charming plot, and not too bad a script (by Abram S. Ginnes) have been lost along the way in this overproduced period re-creation that is only moderately entertaining. The director, Norman Jewison, tries hard, but he just doesn't have the feeling for Hecht's Chicago; he uses huge mobs and big locations, but the whole movie seems to be on a musical-comedy stage." Gene Siskel of the Chicago Tribune gave the film three stars out of four and wrote that it "is paled by Hecht's writings, but it stands well ahead of many films, as fine entertainment that will have you laughing." Kevin Thomas of the Los Angeles Times called it "a delightful comedy" with "most persuasive" performances. Gary Arnold of The Washington Post wrote, "By all rights, the material should be great on film, but Jewison, stymied by either a lack of wit or a desire to be too ingratiating, gets the least interesting effect possible. This 'Gaily, Gaily' is a bumptious family comedy rather than the uninhibited but poignant elegy to youth and recreation of a vanished era that Hecht had in mind." David Pirie of The Monthly Film Bulletin wrote, "The script here is a fairly predictable period romp, based loosely on Ben Hecht's novel and only very sporadically funny. Even more disappointing, despite a reasonably distinguished cast and Jewison's proven ability with actors, is that there is barely only one really enjoyable performance in the whole film: only Brian Keith, as a shamelessly unscrupulous and sentimental Irish newsman, is fully successful, and he provides nearly all the film's best comedy."

== Awards ==
The film was nominated for three Academy Awards:

- Best Art Direction (Art Direction: Robert F. Boyle and George B. Chan; Set Decoration: Edward G. Boyle and Carl Biddiscombe)
- Best Costume Design (Ray Aghayan)
- Best Sound (Robert Martin and Clem Portman)
