= Joan Keller Stern =

American filmmaker

Joan Keller Stern, born as Joan Keller, (born February 6, 1944) is an American film producer and film actress who was awarded an Oscar in 1970 for the documentary short film she produced, The Magic Machines.

== Career ==
Joan Keller Stern's name first appeared in the film industry in 1967 when she was in the comedy horror film Spider Baby by Jack Hill, in a small role as Aunt Martha, and worked in the costume area for it.

In 1969, Keller Stern appeared as the producer of the short documentary film The Magic Machines, for whose production she was awarded an Oscar. The film also received the Jury Prize at the 1970 Cannes Film Festival. The film presents the work of the sculptor Robert Gilbert, who creates kinetic and mechanical machines from scrap parts, which he then paints.

Later Joan Keller remarried to the son of David O. Selznick, Daniel Selznick; she called herself from then on Joan Keller Selznick. Keller Selznick has since made a name for herself as a socialite and host of dinner parties for high-ranking personalities.

== Selected filmography ==
1967: Spider Baby (actress who played Aunt Martha and worker in costume area)
1969: The Magic Machines (documentary short film; producer)

== Awards and nominations ==
- Won - Academy Award for Best Live Action Short Film for The Magic Machines (1969)
- Nominated - Academy Award for Best Documentary (Short Subject) for The Magic Machines (1969)
