= Richard C. Meyer =

American screenwriter (1920–1985)

- Born: April 5, 1920; Frankfurt, Weimar Republic
- Died: July 19, 1985 (aged 65); Los Angeles, California, U.S.
- Occupations: Film editor, writer and producer

Richard C. Meyer (April 5, 1920 – July 19, 1985) was a German-American television and film editor and occasional film writer and film producer. He was nominated for a Primetime Emmy Award for Outstanding Film Editing for the miniseries King (1978). He also won the BAFTA Award for Best Editing for Butch Cassidy and the Sundance Kid in 1970, which he shared with John C. Howard.

Meyer worked as a film editor for such films as Waterloo, Capone and Three in the Attic.

== Selected filmography ==
Editor
Year	Film	Director	Notes
1955	Seven Angry Men	Charles Marquis Warren	
1956	Crime in the Streets	Don Siegel	
1956	The Wild Party	Harry Horner	
1957	Oedipus Rex	Tyrone Guthrie	
1957	Men in War	Anthony Mann	First collaboration with Anthony Mann
1957	Hot Rod Rumble	Leslie H. Martinson	
1957	Reform School Girl	Edward Bernds	First collaboration with Edward Bernds
1957	Undersea Girl	John Peyser	
1957	Motorcycle Gang	Edward L. Cahn	
1958	God's Little Acre	Anthony Mann	Second collaboration with Anthony Mann
1958	Anna Lucasta	Arnold Laven	
1959	The Sad Horse	James B. Clark	
1959	Return of the Fly	Edward Bernds	Third collaboration with Edward Bernds
1959	Happy Anniversary	David Miller	
1960	Young Jesse James	William F. Claxton	
1963	The Castilian	Javier Setó	
1968	Three in the Attic	Richard Wilson	
1969	Winning	James Goldstone	
1969	Butch Cassidy and the Sundance Kid	George Roy Hill	
1970	Waterloo	Sergei Bondarchuk	
1975	Capone	Steve Carver	
1976	Albino	Jürgen Goslar	
1982	Silent Rage	Michael Miller	First collaboration with Michael Miller
1982	Class Reunion	Michael Miller	Second collaboration with Michael Miller
1982	Jimmy the Kid	Gary Nelson	
1985	Hollywood Harry	Robert Forster	

Editorial department
Year	Film	Director	Role	Notes
1959	Alaska Passage	Edward Bernds	Supervising editor	Second collaboration with Edward Bernds
1972	Z.P.G.	Michael Campus	Supervising editor	
1975	The Eiger Sanction	Clint Eastwood	Assistant editor: United States	
1979	Pacific Inferno	Rolf Bayer	Editorial supervisor	
1980	Getting Wasted	Paul Frizler	Editorial supervisor	
1980	The Unseen	Danny Steinmann	Editorial supervisor	
1987	Emanon	Stuart Paul	Supervising editor	

Additional crew
Year	Film	Director	Role
1975	Cry, Onion!	Enzo G. Castellari	Creative consultant
1976	The Little Girl Who Lives Down the Lane	Nicolas Gessner	Creative consultant

Producer
Year	Film	Director	Credit
1964	Pyro... The Thing Without a Face	Julio Coll	Producer
1970	Waterloo	Sergei Bondarchuk	Associate executive

Documentaries

Editorial department
Year	Film	Director	Role
1967	Teenage Rebellion	Norman T. Herman; Jörn Donner; Jean Herman; Walt Sheldon; Eriprando Visconti	Supervising editor

Producer
Year	Film	Director	Credit
1967	Teenage Rebellion	Norman T. Herman; Jörn Donner; Jean Herman; Walt Sheldon; Eriprando Visconti	Associate producer

TV movies

Editor
Year	Film	Director
1966	Scalplock	James Goldstone
1974	The Girl on the Late, Late Show	Gary Nelson
1978	King	Abby Mann
1978	My Husband Is Missing	Richard Michaels
1979	Sex and the Single Parent	Jackie Cooper

Production manager
Year	Film	Director	Role
1979	The Darker Side of Terror	Gus Trikonis	Post-production supervisor

TV series

Editor
Year	Title	Notes
1951	The Bigelow Theatre	1 episode
1953−55	The Jack Benny Program	7 episodes
1960	Assignment: Underwater	3 episodes
1965	The Wackiest Ship in the Army	1 episode
1966−67	Iron Horse	10 episodes
1967	The Second Hundred Years	1 episode
1968	The Guns of Will Sonnett	1 episode
1969	The Outcasts	1 episode
1969	The Bold Ones: The Protectors	1 episode
1973−74	Police Story	5 episodes
1978	King	3 episodes

Editorial department
Year	Title	Role	Notes
1960	Assignment: Underwater	Supervising editor	5 episodes

Writer
Year	Title	Notes
1966	Iron Horse	1 episode
1979	A Man Called Sloane	1 episode
