= The Olympics in Mexico =

1969 documentary film by Alberto Isaac

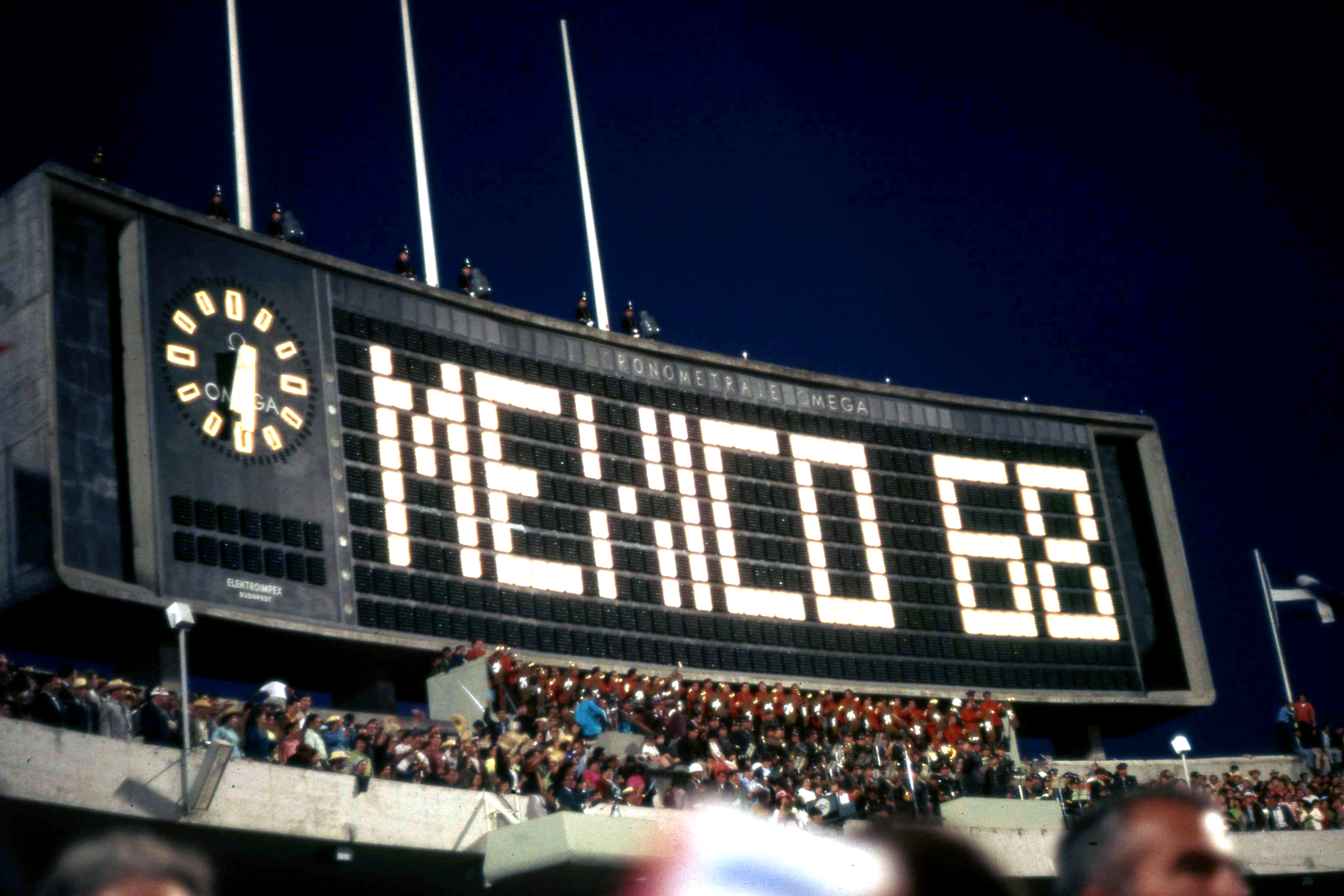
- Opening of the 1968 Summer Olympic Games at the Estadio Olímpico Universitario in Mexico City
- Directed by: Alberto Isaac
- Written by: Alberto Isaac; Fernando Macotela
- Produced by: Federico Amérigo
- Narrated by: Enrique Lizalde; Roberto Morales
- Cinematography: Benjamin Montano; Antonio Reynoso
- Release date: August 1969
- Running time: 240 minutes
- Country: Mexico
- Language: Spanish

The Olympics in Mexico (Spanish: Olimpiada en México) is a 1969 Mexican documentary film directed by Alberto Isaac. It was nominated for an Academy Award for Best Documentary Feature. The film was preserved by the Academy Film Archive in 1999.

== See also ==
- 1968 Summer Olympics
