= Clem Portman =

American sound engineer

- Born: Clement Augustus Portman; March 1, 1905; Proviso, Illinois, United States
- Died: October 21, 1992 (aged 87); San Clemente, California, United States
- Occupation: Sound engineer
- Years active: 1930 – 1970

Clem Portman (March 1, 1905 – October 21, 1992) was an American sound engineer. He was nominated for an Academy Award in the category Sound Recording for the film Gaily, Gaily. He worked on over 200 films between 1930 and 1970.

== Selected filmography ==
- Gaily, Gaily (1969)
