= John C. Howard =

American film editor (1930–1983)

- Born: July 1, 1930; Los Angeles, California, U.S.
- Died: May 28, 1983 (aged 52); Sherman Oaks, California, U.S.
- Occupation: Film editor

John C. Howard (July 1, 1930 – May 28, 1983) was an American film editor. He was nominated for an Academy Award for Best Film Editing for the film Blazing Saddles (1974). He also won the BAFTA Award for Best Editing for Butch Cassidy and the Sundance Kid in 1970, which he shared with Richard C. Meyer.

He worked as a film editor for such films as Young Frankenstein, Blazing Saddles and History of the World, Part I.

== Selected filmography ==
Editor
Year	Film	Director	Notes
1969	Mastermind	Alex March	
1969	Butch Cassidy and the Sundance Kid	George Roy Hill	
1971	Believe in Me	Stuart Hagmann	
1972	A Separate Peace	Larry Peerce	First collaboration with Larry Peerce
1973	Scalawag	Kirk Douglas	
1974	Blazing Saddles	Mel Brooks	First collaboration with Mel Brooks
1974	Young Frankenstein	Mel Brooks	Second collaboration with Mel Brooks
1975	The Drowning Pool	Stuart Rosenberg	
1976	W. C. Fields and Me	Arthur Hiller	First collaboration with Arthur Hiller
1976	Silent Movie	Mel Brooks	Third collaboration with Mel Brooks
1977	March or Die	Dick Richards	
1977	High Anxiety	Mel Brooks	Fourth collaboration with Mel Brooks
1979	Nightwing	Arthur Hiller	Second collaboration with Arthur Hiller
1979	Americathon	Neal Israel	
1980	Why Would I Lie?	Larry Peerce	Second collaboration with Larry Peerce
1981	History of the World, Part I	Mel Brooks	Fifth collaboration with Mel Brooks
1983	Romantic Comedy	Arthur Hiller	Third collaboration with Arthur Hiller

Editorial department
Year	Film	Director	Role	Notes
1957	Kiss Them for Me	Stanley Donen	Assistant film editor	Uncredited
1978	Sgt. Pepper's Lonely Hearts Club Band	Michael Schultz	Associate editor	
1979	Americathon	Neal Israel	Supervising editor	

TV pilots

Editor
Year	Film	Director
1973	Pomroy's People	Fielder Cook

TV series

Editor
Year	Title	Notes
1973	The Waltons	4 episodes
