= David Dockendorf =

American sound engineer

- Born: David Eugene Dockendorf; November 2, 1923; Wisconsin, U.S.
- Died: April 15, 1997 (aged 73); Los Angeles, California, U.S.
- Occupation: Sound engineer
- Years active: 1958–1990

David Dockendorf (November 2, 1923 – April 15, 1997) was an American sound engineer. He was nominated for an Academy Award in the category Sound Recording for the film Butch Cassidy and the Sundance Kid. He worked on 100 films between 1958 and 1990.

At the 24th British Academy Film Awards, he won a BAFTA Award for Best Soundtrack. His win was shared with Don Hall and William Edmondson.

== Selected filmography ==
- Butch Cassidy and the Sundance Kid (1969; co-nominated with William Edmondson)
