= William Edmondson (sound engineer) =

American sound engineer

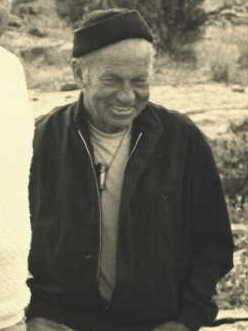
- William R. Edmondson (1970)
- Born: July 4, 1906; Houston, Texas, United States
- Died: April 18, 1998 (aged 91); Portland, Oregon, United States
- Other name: Bill Edmondson
- Occupation: Sound engineer
- Years active: 1931-1979

William Edmondson (July 4, 1906 – April 18, 1998) was an American sound engineer. He was nominated for an Academy Award in the category Sound Recording for the film Butch Cassidy and the Sundance Kid.

== Background ==
William (aka Bill) started his film career during the silent film era as a camera operator but switched to the sound department when given the opportunity.

He worked for MGM studios on various projects. He is credited on most of the "Thin Man" movies as well as most of the "Twilight Zone" episodes and the "Combat" series.

== Family ==
William was born in Houston, Texas in 1906 to Josiah Lewis Edmondson (a civil engineer) and Effie Nettie Kennedy. He was the middle of three sons and also had a younger sister who died at the age of 10 in a fire. His parents divorced a year after the death of their daughter. William's father left for Mexico shortly thereafter and was lost to the family. Their mother moved the family to Long Beach, California.

He was also the first cousin of Lon Chaney via his mother. Her father was Wiliam Bainbridge Kennedy, and Lon Chaney's grandfather was his brother Jonathan Ralston Kennedy who was the first superintendent of the Mute Institute at Olathe Kansas and later of Colorado Springs, Colorado.

== Selected filmography ==
- Butch Cassidy and the Sundance Kid (1969; co-nominated with David Dockendorf)
