= Speed skating =

Competitive form of ice skating

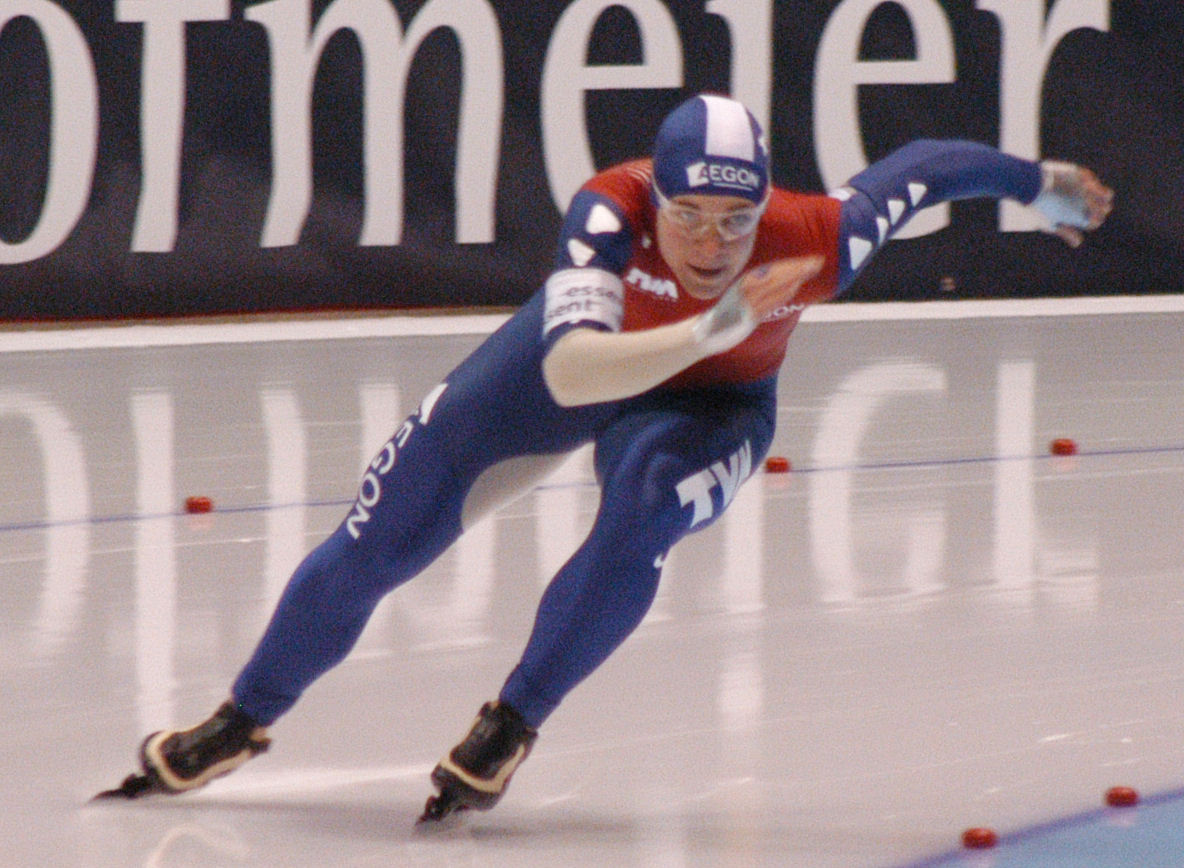
- Paulien van Deutekom, Thialf, 2007
- Highest governing body: International Skating Union

Characteristics
- Mixed-sex: Yes

Presence
- Olympic: 1924

Speed skating is a competitive form of ice skating in which the competitors race each other in travelling a certain distance on skates. Types of speed skating are long-track speed skating, short-track speed skating, and marathon speed skating. In the Olympic Games, long-track speed skating is usually referred to as just "speed skating", while short-track speed skating is known a "short track". The International Skating Union (ISU), the governing body of competitive ice sports, refers to long track as "speed skating" and short track as "short track skating". Long track speed skating takes place on a 400 m ice track, while short track takes place on a 111 m track.

An international federation was founded in 1892, the first for any winter sport. The sport enjoys large popularity in the Netherlands, Norway and South Korea. There are top international rinks in a number of other countries, including Canada, the United States, Germany, Italy, Japan, Russia, Kazakhstan, China, Belarus and Poland. A World Cup circuit is held with events in those countries plus two events in the Thialf ice hall in Heerenveen, Netherlands.

== Overview ==
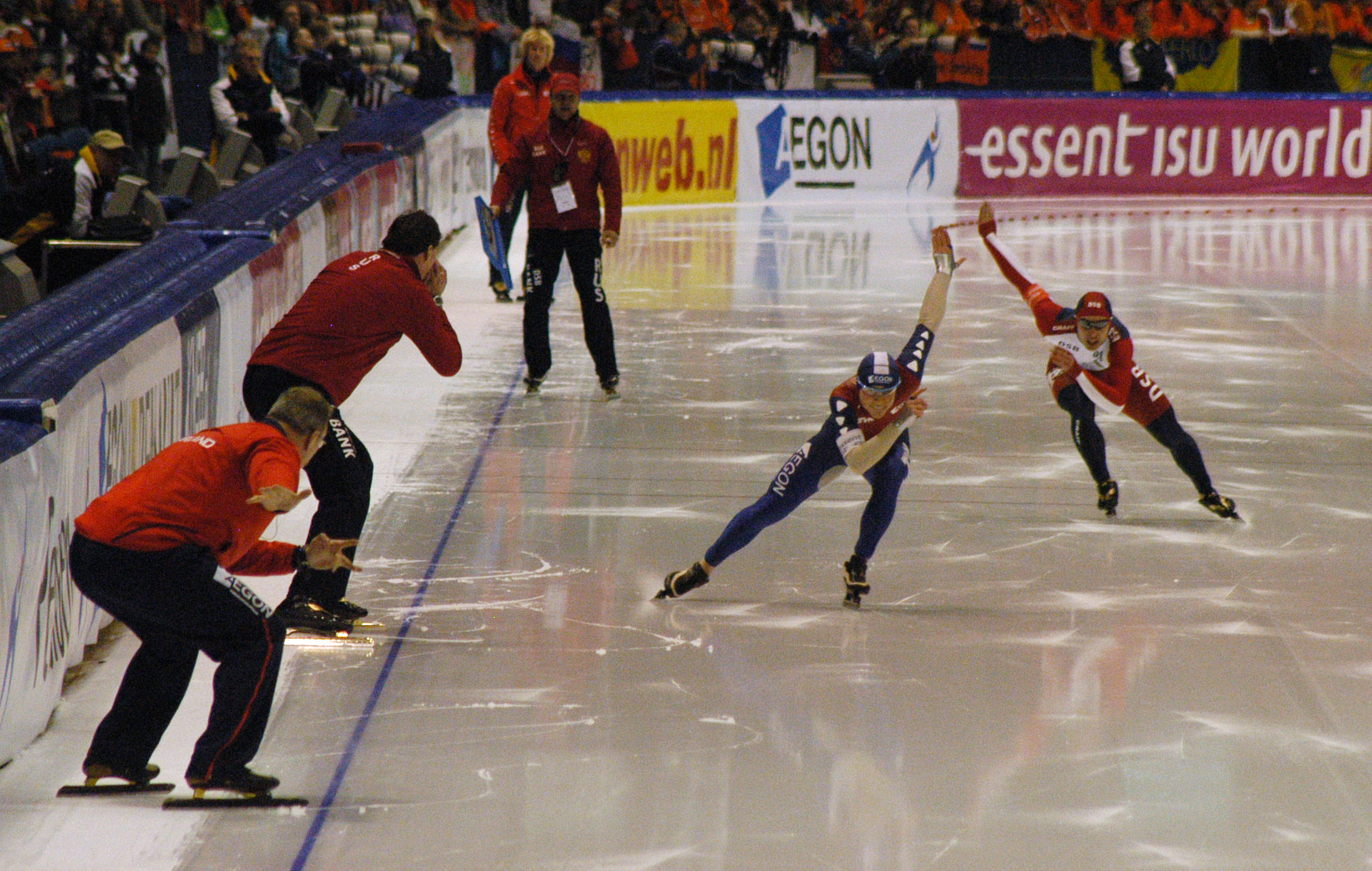
Long-track speed skating, Thialf, 2008

The standard rink for long track is 400 meters long, but tracks of 200, 250 and 333 1/3 meters are used occasionally. It is one of two Olympic forms of the sport and the one with the longer history.

ISU rules allow some leeway in the size and radius of curves.

Short-track speed skating takes place on a smaller rink, normally the size of an ice hockey rink, on a 111.12 m oval track. Distances are shorter than in long-track racing, with the longest Olympic individual race being 1500 meters (the women's relay is 3000 meters and the men's relay 5000 meters). Events are usually held with a knockout format, with the best two in heats of four or five qualifying for the final race, where medals are awarded. Disqualifications and falls are not uncommon.

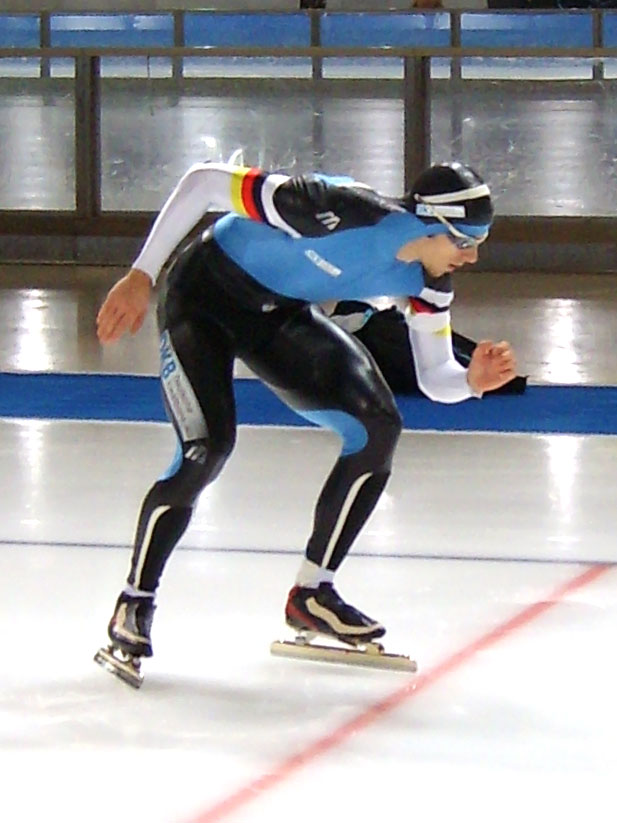
Individual start

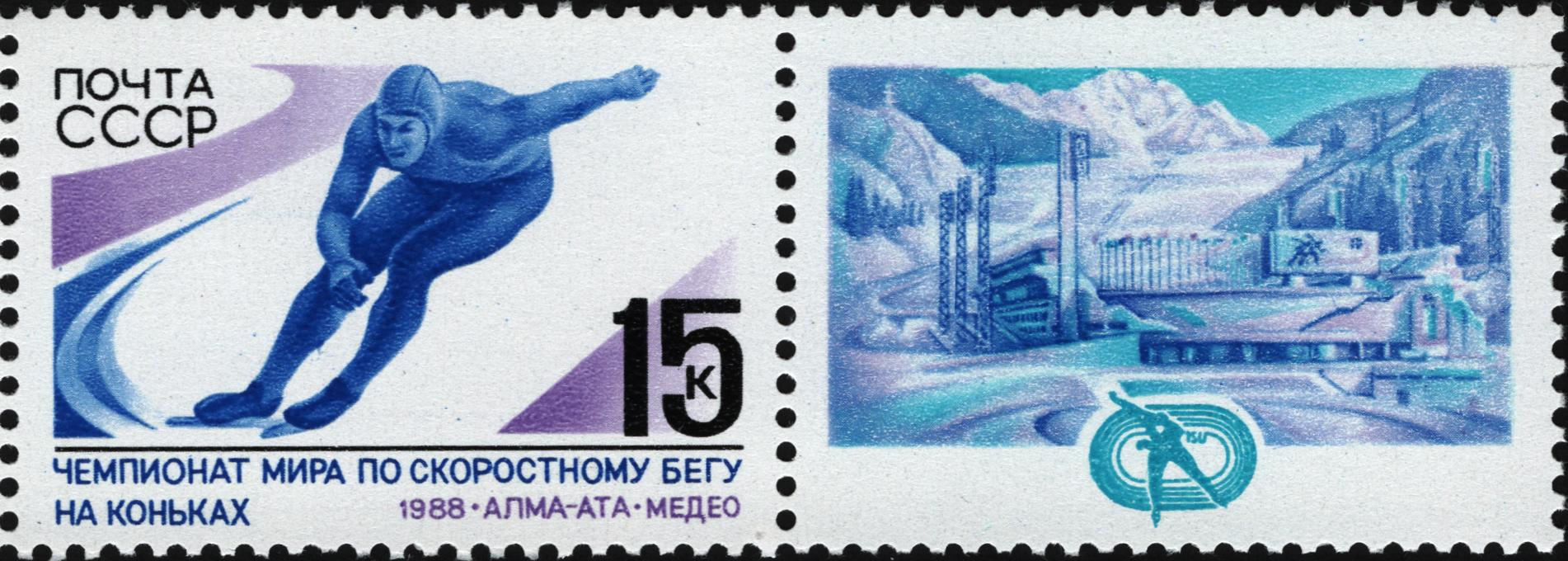
Speed skating on a stamp

There are variations on the mass-start races. In the regulations of roller sports, eight different types of mass starts are described. Among them are elimination races, where one or more competitors are eliminated at fixed points during the course; simple distance races, which may include preliminary races; endurance races with time limits instead of a fixed distance; points races; and individual pursuits.

Races usually have rules about disqualification if an opponent is unfairly hindered; these rules vary between the disciplines. In long track speed skating, almost any infringement on the pairmate is punished, though skaters are permitted to change from the inner to the outer lane out of the final curve if they are not able to hold the inner curve, as long as they are not interfering with the other skater. In mass-start races, skaters will usually be allowed some physical contact.

Team races are also held; in long track speed skating, the only team race at the highest level of competition is the team pursuit, though athletics-style relay races are held at children's competitions. Relay races are also held in short track and inline competitions, but here exchanges may take place at any time during the race, though exchanges may be banned during the last couple of laps.

Most speed skating races are held on an oval course, but there are exceptions. Oval sizes vary; in short track speed skating, the rink must be an oval of 111.12 metres, while long track speed skating uses a similarly standardized 400 m rink. Inline skating rinks are between 125 and 400 metres, though banked tracks can only be 250 metres long. Inline skating can also be held on closed road courses between 400 and 1,000 metres, as well as open-road competitions where starting and finishing lines do not coincide. This is also a feature of outdoor marathons.

In the Netherlands, marathon competitions may be held on natural ice on canals, and bodies of water such as lakes and rivers, but may also be held on artificially frozen 400 m tracks, with skaters circling the track 100 times, for example.

== History ==
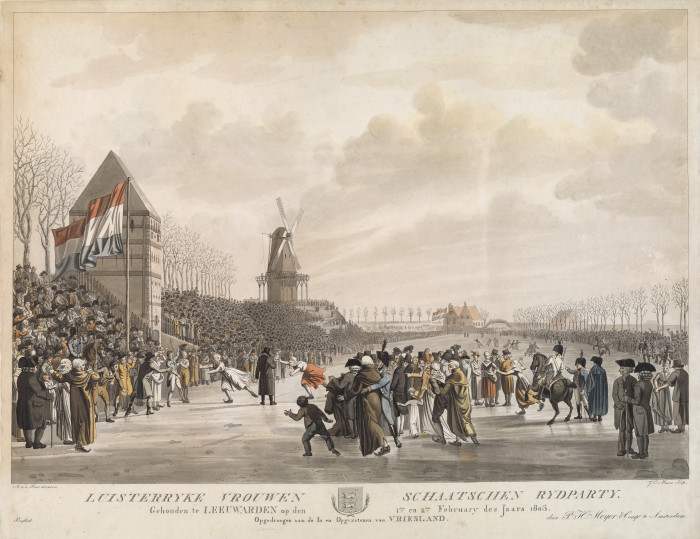
The first recorded women's speed skating competition in Leeuwarden in 1805, by Allert Jacobs van der Poort.

The origins of speed skating date back over a millennium in the North of Europe, especially Scandinavia and the Netherlands, where the natives added bones to their shoes and used them to travel on frozen rivers, canals and lakes. Later, in Norway, King Eystein Magnusson, later King Eystein I of Norway, boasts of his skills racing on bone skates, so called "ice legs".

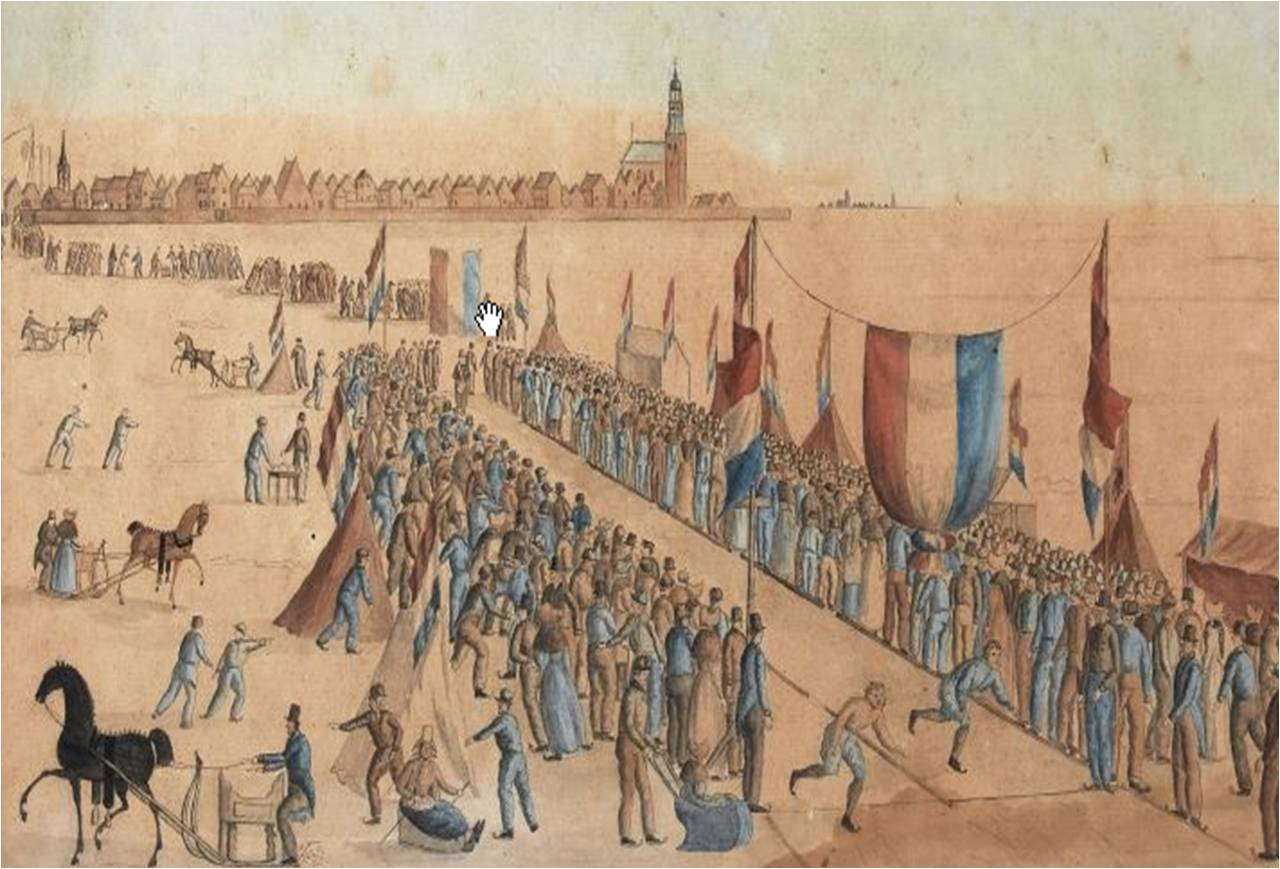
Speed skating match on the Zuiderzee near Hindeloopen, Netherlands, in 1828

However, skating and speed skating was not limited to the Netherlands and Scandinavia; in 1592, a Scotsman designed a skate with an iron blade. It was iron-bladed skates that led to the spread of skating and, in particular, speed skating. By 1642, the first known skating club, The Skating Club of Edinburgh, was born, and, in 1763, the first speed skating race known in any detail was held from Wisbech to Whittlesey on the Fens in England for a prize sum of 20 guineas, won by John Lamb of Wisbech. While in the Netherlands, people began touring the waterways connecting the 11 cities of Friesland, a challenge which eventually led to the Elfstedentocht.

The first known speed skating competition for women was in Heerenveen, the Netherlands from 1 to 2 February 1805. 130 women competed in a knockout-style competition on a frozen canal in front of a crowd that reportedly numbered 10,000 or more. The winner was Trijntje Pieters Westra, a twenty-year-old farmer's daughter from Poppingawier.

By 1851, North Americans had discovered a love of the sport, and the all-steel blade was later developed there. In Norway speed skating also became popular, as there was a huge interest in the 1885 speed skating race at Frognerkilen between Axel Paulsen and Renke van der Zee. The Netherlands came back to the fore in 1889 with the organization of the first world championships. The ISU (International Skating Union) was also born in the Netherlands in 1892. By the start of the 20th century, skating and speed skating had come into its own as a major popular sporting activity.

=== ISU development ===
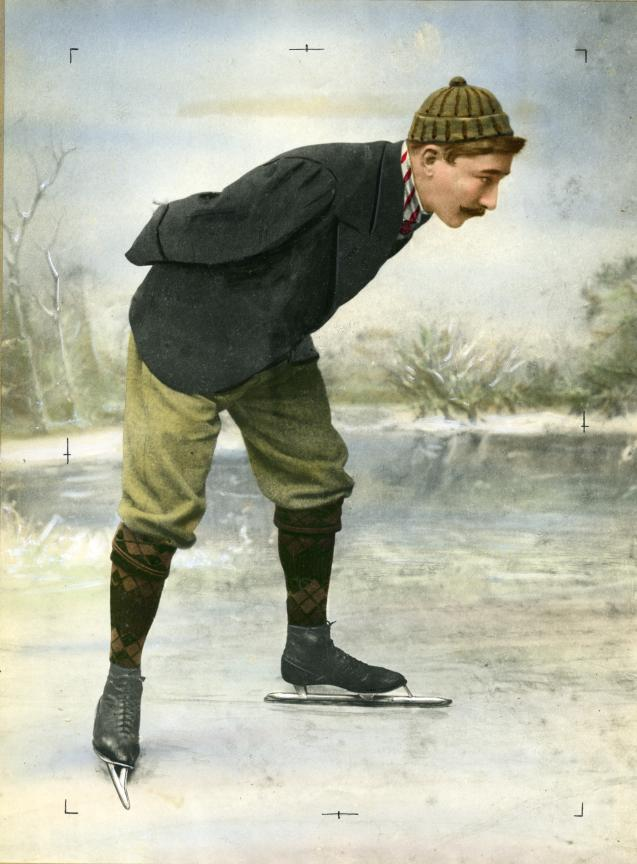
Jaap Eden, the first official world champion

Organized races on ice skates developed in the 19th century. Norwegian clubs hosted competitions from 1863, with races in Christiania drawing five-digit crowds. In 1884, the Norwegian Axel Paulsen was named Amateur Champion Skater of the World after winning competitions in the United States. Five years later, a sports club in Amsterdam held an ice-skating event they called a world championship, with participants from Russia, the United States and the United Kingdom, as well as the host country. The Internationale Eislauf Vereinigung, now known as the International Skating Union, was founded at a meeting of 15 national representatives in Scheveningen in 1892, the first international winter sports federation. The Nederlandse Schaatsrijderbond was founded in 1882 and organised the world championships of 1890 and 1891. Competitions were held around tracks of varying lengths—the 1885 match between Axel Paulsen and Remke van der Zee was skated on a track of 6/7 mile (1400 metres)—but the 400 metre track was standardised by the ISU in 1892, along with the standard distances for world championships, 500 m, 1500 m, 5000 m and 10,000 m. Skaters started in pairs, each to their own lane, and changed lanes for every lap to ensure that each skater completed the same distance. This is what is now known as long track speed skating. Competitions were exclusively for amateur skaters, which was enforced. Peter Sinnerud was disqualified for professionalism in 1904 and lost his world title.

Long track world records were first registered in imperial distances and since 1880 in metrical distances. The latter ones improved rapidly since their adoption as standard distances by the ISU, with Jaap Eden lowering the world 5000-metre record by half a minute during the Hamar European Championships in 1894. However, the record stood for 17 years, and it took over 50 years to lower it by further half a minute.

=== Elfstedentocht ===
Historical footage of the 1954 Elfstedentocht with Dutch commentary

The Elfstedentocht was organized as a competition in 1909 and has been held at irregular intervals, whenever the ice on the course is deemed good enough. Other outdoor races developed later, with Friesland in the northern Netherlands hosting a race in 1917, but the Dutch natural ice conditions have rarely been conducive to skating. The Elfstedentocht has been held 15 times in the nearly 100 years since 1909, and, before artificial ice was available in 1962, national championships had been held in 25 of the years between 1887, when the first championship was held in Slikkerveer, and 1961. Since artificial ice became common in the Netherlands, Dutch speed skaters have been among the world top in long track ice skating and marathon skating. Another solution to still be able to skate marathons on natural ice became the Alternative Elfstedentocht. The Alternative Elfstedentocht races take part in other countries, such as Austria, Finland or Canada, and all top marathon skaters, as well as thousands of recreative skaters, travel from the Netherlands to the location where the race is held. According to the NRC Handelsblad journalist Jaap Bloembergen, the country "takes a carnival look" during international skating championships.

=== Olympic Games ===
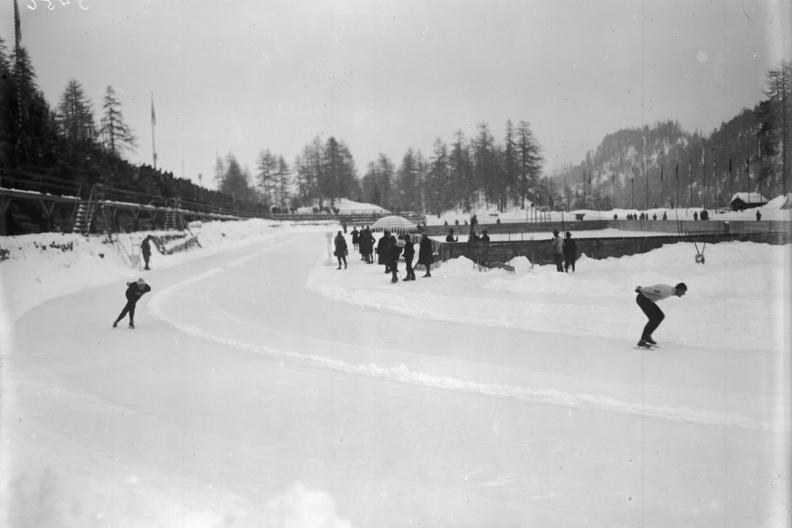
Speed skating at the 1928 Winter Olympics in St. Moritz, Switzerland

At the 1914 Olympic Congress, the delegates agreed to include ice speed skating in the 1916 Olympics, after figure skating had featured in the 1908 Olympics. However, World War I put an end to the plans of Olympic competition, and it was not until the winter sports week in Chamonix in 1924—retroactively awarded Olympic status—that ice speed skating reached the Olympic programme. Charles Jewtraw from Lake Placid, New York, won the first Olympic gold medal, though several Norwegians in attendance claimed Oskar Olsen had clocked a better time. Timing issues on the 500 were a problem within the sport until electronic clocks arrived in the 1960s; during the 1936 Olympic 500–metre race, it was suggested that Ivar Ballangrud's 500-metre time was almost a second too good. Finland won the remaining four gold medals at the 1924 Games, with Clas Thunberg winning 1,500 metres, 5,000 metres, and allround. It was the first and only time an allround Olympic gold medal has been awarded in speed skating. Speed Skating is also a sport in today's Olympics.

Norwegian and Finnish skaters won all the gold medals in world championships between the world wars, with Latvians and Austrians visiting the podium in the European Championships. However, North American races were usually conducted pack-style, similar to the marathon races in the Netherlands, but the Olympic races were to be held over the four ISU-approved distances. The ISU approved the suggestion that the speed skating at the 1932 Winter Olympics should be held as pack-style races, and Americans won all four gold medals. Canada won five medals, all silver and bronze, while defending World Champion Clas Thunberg stayed at home, protesting against this form of racing. At the World Championships held immediately after the games, without the American champions, Norwegian racers won all four distances and occupied the three top spots in the allround standings.

Norwegians, Swedes, Finns, and Japanese skating leaders protested to the USOC, condemning the manner of competition and expressing the wish that mass-start races were never to be held again at the Olympics. However, the ISU adopted the short track speed skating branch, with mass-start races on shorter tracks, in 1967, arranged international competitions from 1976, and brought them back to the Olympics in 1992.

=== Technical developments ===
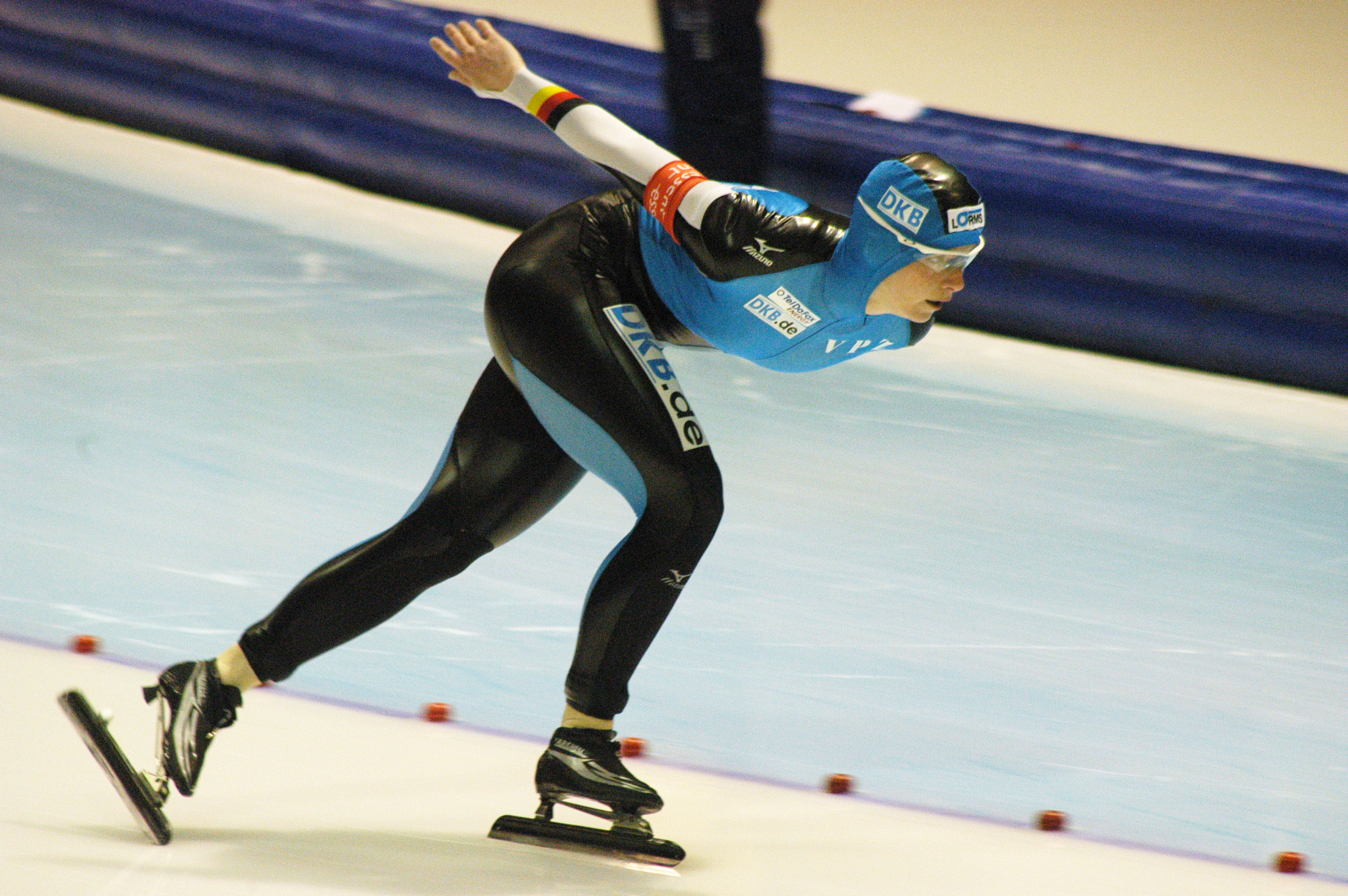
Monique Angermüller on clap skates and in a full body-covering suit in 2008

Artificial ices entered the long track competitions with the 1960 Winter Olympics, and the competitions in 1956 on Lake Misurina were the last Olympic competitions on natural ice. 1960 also saw the first Winter Olympic competitions for women. Lidia Skoblikova won two gold medals in 1960 and four in 1964.

More aerodynamic skating suits were also developed, with Swiss skater Franz Krienbühl (who finished 8th on the Olympic 10,000 m at the age of 46) at the front of development. After a while, national teams took over development of bodysuits, which are also used in short track skating, though without headcover attached to the suit—short trackers wear helmets instead, as falls are more common in mass-start races. Suits and indoor skating, as well as the clap skate, has helped to lower long track world records considerably; from 1971 to 2009, the average speed on the men's 1500 metres has been raised from 45 to 52 km/h. Similar speed increases are shown in the other distances.

=== Professionalism ===
After the 1972 season, European long track skaters founded a professional league, International Speedskating League, which included Ard Schenk, three-time Olympic gold medallist in 1972, as well as five Norwegians, four other Dutchmen, three Swedes, and a few other skaters. Jonny Nilsson, 1963 world champion and Olympic gold medallist, was the driving force behind the league, which folded in 1974 for economic reasons, and the ISU also excluded tracks hosting professional races from future international championships. The ISU later organised its own World Cup circuit with monetary prizes, and full-time professional teams developed in the Netherlands during the 1990s, which led them to a dominance on the men's side only challenged by Japanese 500 m racers and American inline skaters who changed to long tracks to win Olympic gold.

=== North American professionals ===
During the 20th century, roller skating also developed as a competitive sport. Roller-skating races were professional from an early stage. Professional World Championships were arranged in North America between the competitors on that circuit. Later, roller derby leagues appeared, a professional contact sport that originally was a form of racing. FIRS World Championships of inline speed skating go back to the 1980s, but many world champions, such as Derek Parra and Chad Hedrick, have switched to ice in order to win Olympic medals.

Like roller skating, ice speed skating was also professional in North America. Oscar Mathisen, five-time ISU world champion and three-time European champion, renounced his amateur status in 1916 and travelled to America, where he won many races but was beaten by Bobby McLean of Chicago, four-time American champion, in one of the races. Chicago was a centre of ice speed skating in America; the Chicago Tribune sponsored a competition called the Silver Skates from 1912 to 2014.

=== Short track enters the Olympics ===
In 1992, short track speed skating was accepted as an Olympic sport. Short track speed skating had little following in the long track speed skating countries of Europe, such as Norway, the Netherlands and the former Soviet Union, with none of these nations having won official medals (though the Netherlands won two gold medals when the sport was a demonstration event in 1988). The Norwegian publication Sportsboken spent ten pages detailing the long track speed skating events at the Albertville Games in 1993, but short track was not mentioned by word, though the results pages appeared in that section.

Although this form of speed skating is newer, it is growing faster than long-track speed skating, largely because short track can be done on an ice hockey rink rather than a long-track oval.

== Rules ==
=== Short track ===
Races are run counter-clockwise on a 111-meter track. Short track races are almost always run in a mass start format in which two to six skaters may race at once. Skaters may be disqualified for false starts, impeding, and cutting inside the track. False starts occur when a skater moves before the gun goes off at the start of a race. Skaters are disqualified for impeding when one skater cuts in front of another skater and causes the first skater to stand up to avoid collision or fall. Cutting inside the track occurs when a skater's skates goes inside the blocks which mark the track on the ice. If disqualified, the skater will be given last place in their heat or final.

=== Long track ===
Races are run counter-clockwise on a 400-meter oval. In almost all individual competition forms, only two skaters are allowed to race at once. Skaters must change lanes every lap. The skater changing from the outside lane to the inside has right-of-way. Skaters may be disqualified for false starts, impeding, and cutting inside the track. If a skater misses their race or falls they have the option to race their distance again. There are no heats or finals in long track; all rankings are by time. The exception to this is the mass start event, in which all skaters (usually 16; maximum of 24) start and race together. Unlike other events, skaters in mass start can use the entire track, minor physical contact is tolerated, and there is no re-race option.

The starting procedure in long-track speed skating consists of three parts. First, the referee tells the athletes to "Go to the start". Second, the referee cues the athletes to get "Ready", and waits until the skaters have stopped moving. Finally, the referee waits for a random duration between 1 and 1.5 seconds, and then fires the starting shot. This start sequence is used in every race, short track and long track. Some argue that this inherent timing variability could disadvantage athletes that start after longer pauses, due to the alerting effect.

In the only non-individual competition form, the team pursuit, two teams of each three to four skaters are allowed to race at once. Both teams remain in the inner lane for the duration of the race; they start on opposite sides of the rink. If four skaters are racing one skater is allowed to drop off and stop racing. The clock stops when the third skater crosses the finish line.

=== Team pursuit ===
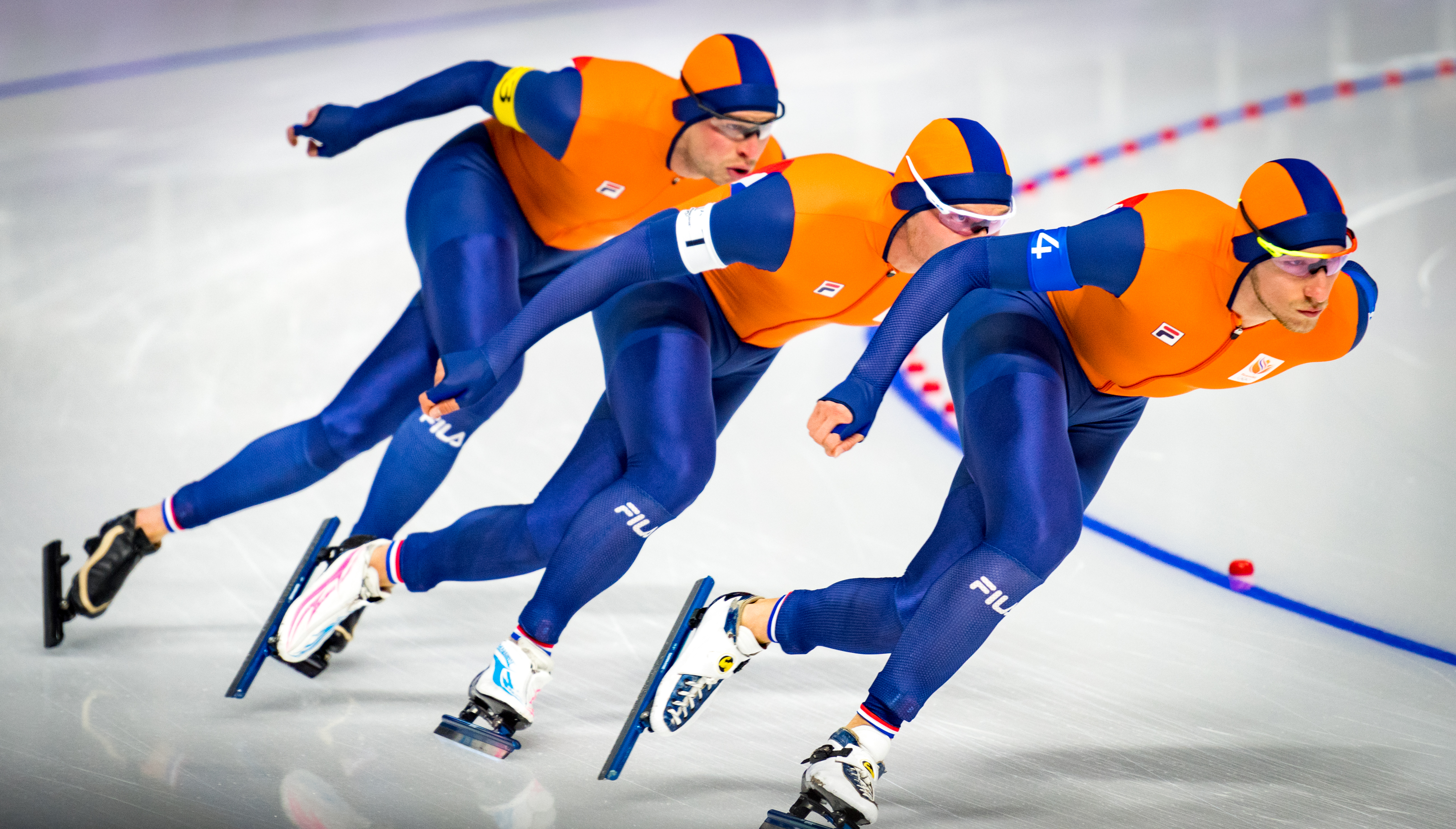
Sven Kramer, Jan Blokhuijsen and Koen Verweij (NED) in team pursuit at the 2018 Winter Olympics.

The team pursuit is a team event in speed skating and is skated by teams of three skaters. Races resemble the team pursuit event in track cycling. Two teams race at a time, starting at a line in the middle of the straightaway. One team starts on each side of the track. Only the inner lane is used. The distance is eight laps for men and six for women. The team's time is the third skater to cross the finish line.

There are several formats for the team pursuit. The Olympic format is unusual in that it is a cup format, with several rounds of exclusion between two teams. In the World Cup and World Championships, one race is skated and the teams are ranked by their finishing time. In the Olympic format, a team that overtakes the other has automatically won the race and the remaining distance is not skated. In practice, the distance is so short that this rarely happens unless one team has a fall.

The team pursuit is a new event in major international competitions. The event was introduced at international level at the world junior championships around the turn of the millennium, and to the World Cup in 2003, but it was not considered an official ISU event until around 2004, and eventually introduced at the Olympics in 2006.

== Equipment ==
Speed skates: Speed skates differ greatly from hockey skates and figure skates. Unlike hockey skates and figure skates, speed skates cut off at the ankle and are built more like a shoe than a boot to allow for more ankle compression. The blades range in length from 30–45 centimetres (12–18 in) depending on the age and height of the skater. Short track blades are fixed to the boot in at the heel and immediately behind the ball of the foot. Long track skates, also called clap skates, attach to a hinge at the front of the boot. The heel of the boot detaches from the blade on every stroke, through a spring mechanism located at the front connector. This extends the skater's stroke by keeping the blade on the ice longer. Speed skates are manually sharpened using a jig to hold them in place.

Short track: All short track skaters must have speed skates, a spandex skin suit, protective helmet, specific cut proof skating gloves, knee pads and shin pads (in suit), neck guard (bib style) and ankle protection. Protective eyewear is mandatory. Many skaters wear smooth ceramic or carbon fiber tips on the left hand glove to reduce friction when their hand is on the ice at corners. All skaters who race at a national level must wear a cutproof Kevlar suit to protect against being cut from another skater's blade.

Long track: For long track skaters, the same equipment should be worn as short track racers but with the exception of a helmet, shin pads, knee pads, and neck guard which are not required; along with their blades. Long track skaters skate on what are called "clap blades". These blades have hinges under the boot towards the back. It is described in more detail above. Protective eyewear is not mandatory. The suit also does not need to be Kevlar. Long track skaters wear a hood that is built into the suit.

Skate sharpening: To sharpen their skates, skaters must place their skates on a jig and move diamond or stone stones back and forth. The diamond stones will have different colors that will be assigned to them depending on how much they eat into the blade; black as the one that affects the blades the most, and gold as the one that affects the least.

== See also ==
- Speed skating rink
- List of speed skaters
- List of world records in speed skating
- List of Olympic records in speed skating
- Adelskalender (skating)
- Fen skating
- Kortebaanschaatsen
- Inline speed skating
