= Jack Loreen =

American burial artist (c. 1901–??)

Jack Loreen (c. 1901 – after 1935) was an American burial artist who gained notoriety for being entombed alive in an underground coffin for 119 days in 1935.

== Career ==
Loreen was an Alaskan gold miner and lumberjack who became a burial artist, being used to enduring long periods of time underground and seeking further financial compensation. Human endurance contests gained popularity during the Great Depression in large part because of the cash prizes the contests promised. Loreen's first stunt was to rollerskate from New York City to Miami and later moved to San Francisco. He pivoted to becoming a burial artist on June 18, 1933, at 9750 South Western Avenue in Evergreen Park, Illinois, a suburb of Chicago. He was unearthed 64 days later. The following year, he remained underground for 65 days. In the summer of 1935, he was bested by burial artist Gloria Graves who remained buried for 90 days. Beginning in June 1935, Loreen was buried in a San Francisco beach and began a new attempt to set the record, during which visitors could pay a dime to talk to him while buried through an 11-inch wide tube that was also used to lower his food. Lorren, being buried six feet below the surface, ultimately beat her record emerging on October 18, 1935.
