= Gloria Graves =

American burial artist (1915-1996)

Corinne Nienstedt, better known by her stage name Gloria Graves (c.1915 - 1996), was an American burial artist who gained notoriety for being entombed alive in an underground coffin for 90 days in 1935.

== Career ==
Nienstedt adopted the name Gloria Graves when she teamed with former vaudeville hypnotist Robert Goodwin, known as "Mr. Q", in the early 1930s. Graves was displayed for 90 days as the "Beautiful Girl Buried Alive" on the Ocean Park Pier in Santa Monica, California during the summer of 1935. Graves received food through a tube and spectators were charged ten cents to view her. The steel coffin was covered with 5 tons of earth and Graves was given a telephone for communication and a radio. She was reburied later that fall on Fifth Street and Vermont Avenue in Los Angeles in an attempt to best the world record for voluntary burial by burial artist Jack Loreen. 192 hours into this burial, she was arrested for violating the city's law involving human endurance contests. At court proceedings, Graves brought her coffin to show jury members its safety.

Graves served in the Women Airforce Service Pilots during World War II. She died in 1996.
