= Long-distance racing =

Long-distance racing or long-distance events may refer to:

- Long-distance running
- Long-distance swimming
- Long track speed skating

== See also ==
- Endurance race (disambiguation)
- Race stage
- Racing
- Rallying
