= Kiss Tomorrow Goodbye (film) =

1950 film by Gordon Douglas

- Theatrical release poster
- Directed by: Gordon Douglas
- Screenplay by: Harry Brown
- Based on: the novel Kiss Tomorrow Goodbye by Horace McCoy
- Produced by: William Cagney
- Starring: James Cagney; Barbara Payton; Helena Carter
- Cinematography: J. Peverell Marley
- Edited by: Walter Hannemann; Truman K. Wood
- Music by: Carmen Dragon
- Production company: William Cagney Productions
- Distributed by: Warner Bros. Pictures
- Release date: August 4, 1950 (United States)
- Running time: 102 minutes
- Country: United States
- Language: English
- Box office: $1.7 million

Kiss Tomorrow Goodbye is a 1950 American film noir starring James Cagney, directed by Gordon Douglas, produced by William Cagney and based on the novel by Horace McCoy. The film was banned in Ohio as "a sordid, sadistic presentation of brutality and an extreme presentation of crime with explicit steps in commission."

Supporting Cagney are Luther Adler as a crooked lawyer, and Ward Bond and Barton MacLane as two crooked cops.

== Plot ==
Ralph Cotter is a career criminal who, while escaping from a prison work camp, kills his escape partner, Carleton. On the outside, Cotter ultimately woos Carleton's sister, Holiday, by threatening to expose the fact that she was involved in arranging the prison break. Holiday does not know that Cotter killed her brother. There are hints of a sadomasochistic bond between the two in a scene where Cotter is provoked to whip Holiday with a wet towel, after which she passionately embraces him. Cotter quickly gets back into the crime game—only to be shaken down by corrupt local cops. Things become more complicated with each plan, and worsen when he turns the tables on the bad cops. Finally, Holiday discovers that Cotter killed her brother and that he is dumping her for a wealthy young heiress. She is thrown into a violent rage and shoots Cotter to death.

== Cast ==
- James Cagney as Ralph Cotter
- Barbara Payton as Holiday Carleton
- Helena Carter as Margaret Dobson
- Ward Bond as Insp. Charles Weber
- Luther Adler as Keith 'Cherokee' Mandon
- Barton MacLane as Lt. John Reece
- Steve Brodie as Joe 'Jinx' Raynor
- Rhys Williams as Vic Mason
- Herbert Heyes as Ezra Dobson
- John Litel as Police Chief Tolgate
- William Frawley as Byers
- Gordon Richards as the Butler (uncredited)
- Neville Brand as Carleton, (Holiday's Brother) (uncredited)
- William Cagney as Ralph Cotter's Brother (uncredited)

== Production ==
=== Development ===
Kiss Tomorrow Goodbye was based on a bestselling novel by Horace McCoy that was published in 1948. Humphrey Bogart and Robert Lord were interested in securing the film rights before the novel's publication, but in November 1949, the film rights were sold to William Schiffrin, an independent producer. In February 1950, the Cagney brothers bought the film rights. In March 1950, Barbara Payton was cast. Helena Carter joined the cast in April. Filming began on April 14, 1950, at General Service Studios.

Kiss Tomorrow Goodbye was the first of four movies that the Cagney brothers made for Warner Bros. James Cagney said that he and his brother entered into a deal in which they gave the banks the first $500,000 that the film made, in order to pay back debts from The Time of Your Life.

The Cagneys liked director Gordon M. Douglas' work and signed him to a multi-picture contract.

== Restoration/rerelease ==
In 2011, the film was restored by the UCLA Film & Television Archive in cooperation with Paramount Pictures, funded by the Packard Humanities Institute. The new print was made "from the original 35mm nitrate picture and track negatives and a 35mm safety print." The restoration premiered at the UCLA Festival of Preservation on March 14, 2011.

== Reception ==
=== Critical response ===
Often compared unfavorably to White Heat, Kiss Tomorrow Goodbye received mixed reviews. Critic Fred Camper, in The Chicago Reader, criticized the film's directing, writing: "Gordon Douglas's direction is almost incoherent compared to Raoul Walsh's in White Heat (1949), which features Cagney in a similar role; the compositions and camera movements, while momentarily effective, have little relationship to each other, and the film reads a bit like an orchestra playing without a conductor."

William Brogdon of Variety liked the movie, praising James Cagney's performance by giving a tough character "an occasional light touch". He also commended Douglas's direction, the musical score, and its tight editing.

Film critic Dennis Schwartz generally liked the film and wrote in 2007: "This is an energetic straightforward crime drama based on the book by Horace McCoy (They Shoot Horses, Don't They?) and the screen play, which hardly makes sense and is the root of the film's problems, is by Harry Brown. Gordon M. Douglas (Come Fill the Cup/Only the Valiant) helms it by keeping it fast-paced, brutal and cynical, and lets star James Cagney pick up where he left off in the year earlier White Heat as an unsympathetic mad dog killer. This was an even tougher film, but the crowds did not respond to it as favorably as they did to White Heat (which seems odd, since it is basically the same type of B-movie)."

Filmink said in 2020: "Both Payton and Carter are a little too attractive looking for pudgy old Cagney, who was pushing fifty at the time – did he ever play such a stud muffin? It’s the biggest flaw in an otherwise solid gangster story."
