= Dance marathon =

Event in which people dance or walk to music for an extended period of time

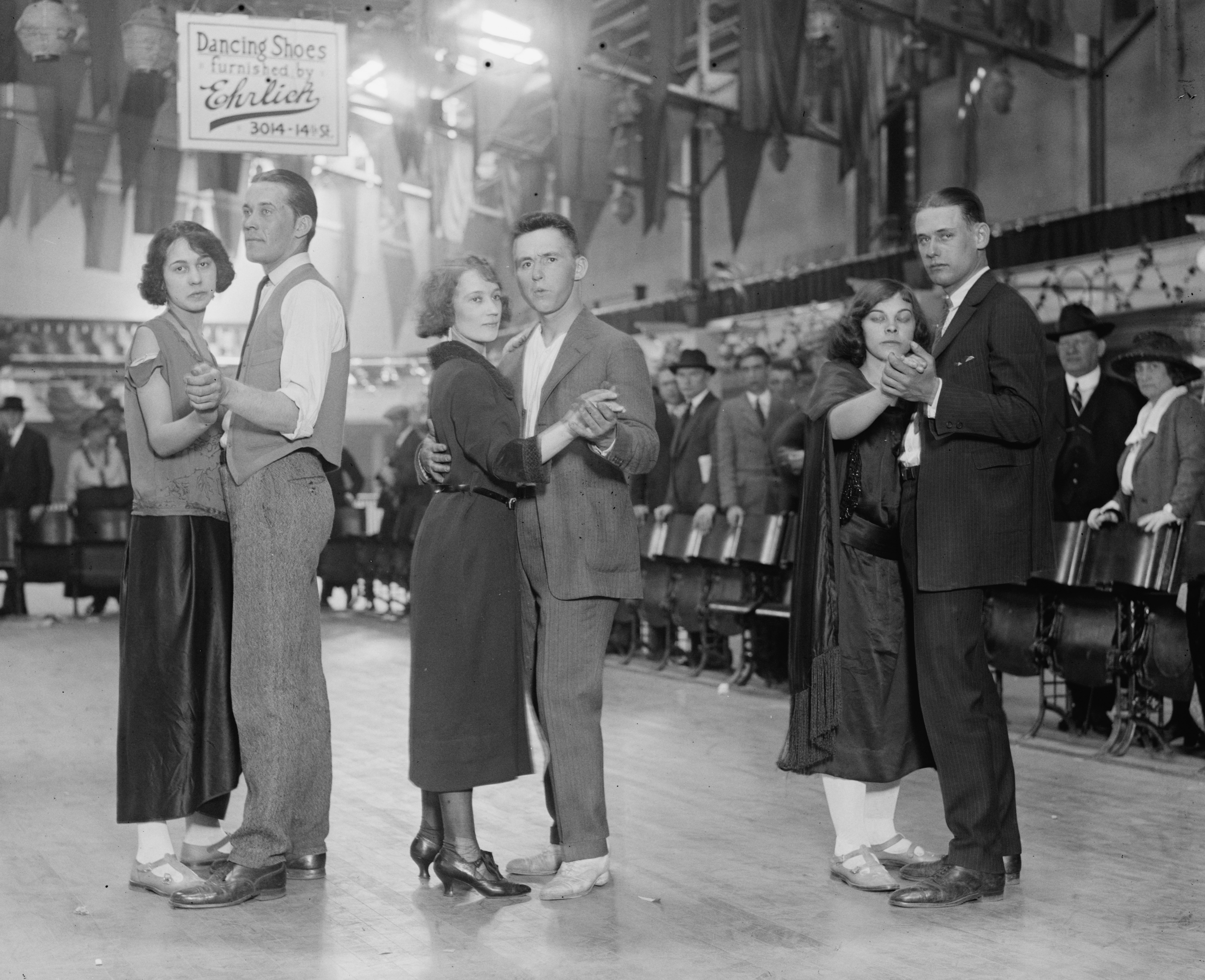
Marathon dancing, 1923

Dance marathons (or marathon dances) are events in which people dance or walk to music for an extended period of time. They started as dance contests in the 1920s and developed into human endurance contests, or exploitative entertainment events during the Great Depression in the 1930s. In the present day, dance marathons are commonly used as fundraisers. These modern marathons are usually 12–24 hours, a far cry from the 1,000-hour marathons of the 1930s.

== Origins ==
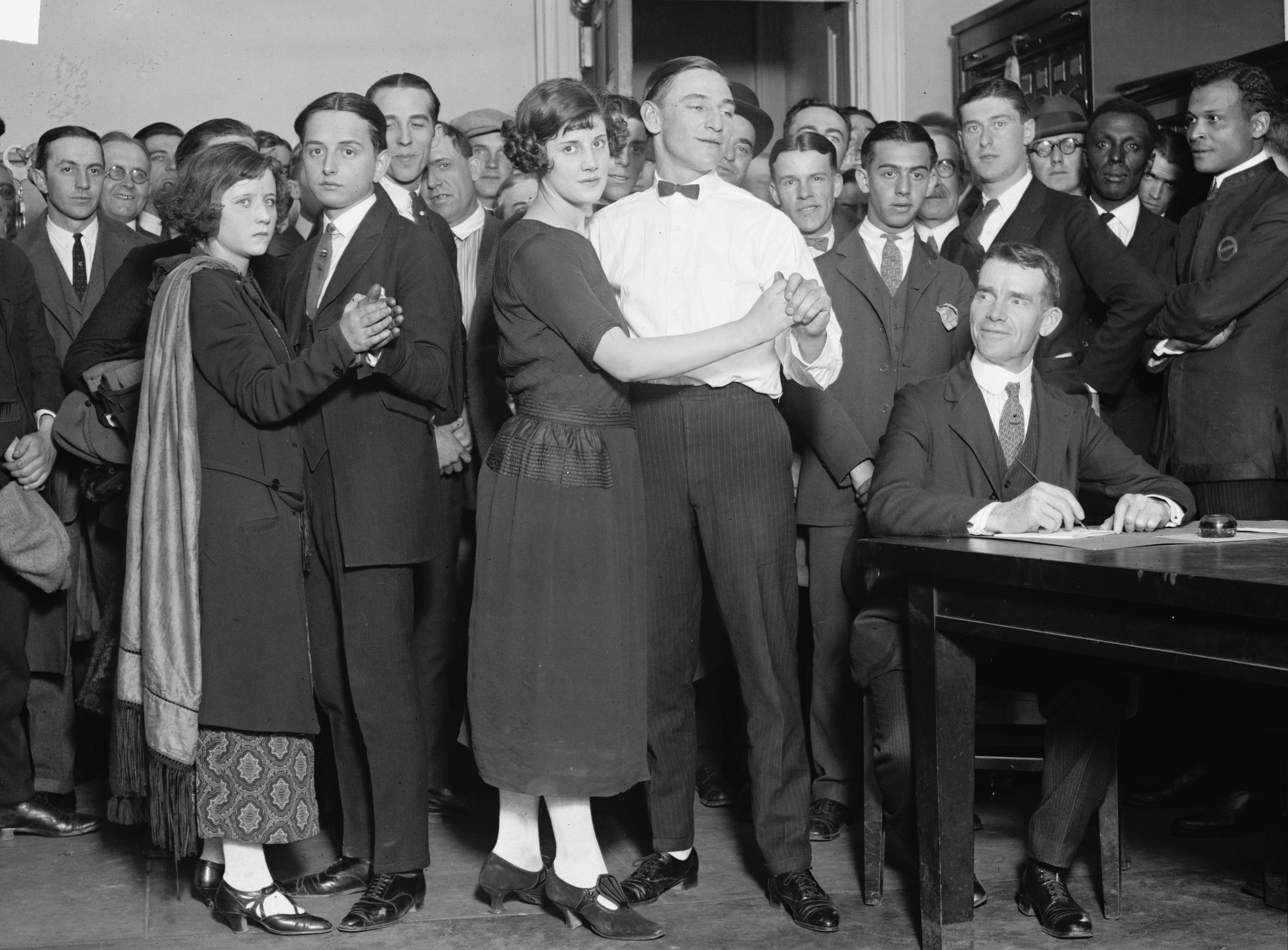
Dancers at a 1923 event

According to Professor Carol Martin of New York University, the revival of the Olympic Games created a widespread interest in feats of strength, endurance contests, and world records that led to dance marathons.

On February 18, 1923, Olie Finnerty and Edgar Van Ollefin set a record by dancing seven hours without stopping in Sunderland, England.

Twelve days later, dance instructor Alma Cummings set a new record at the Audubon Ballroom in New York. She danced continuously for 27 hours with six different partners. Within three weeks, her record was broken at least nine times across the United States.

As the prosperous 1920s faded into the struggling 1930s, dance marathons boomed and offered cash prizes equivalent to a year's salary. They provided contestants and spectators food, shelter and the opportunity to earn cash prizes at a time when many people needed a free meal. By the late 1930s, dance marathons had faded from the cultural landscape.

In her book Dance Marathons: Performing American Culture of the 1920s and 1930s, Carol Martin writes "in their heyday, dance marathons were among America’s most widely attended and controversial forms of live entertainment. The business employed an estimated 20,000 people as promoters, masters of ceremonies, floor judges, trainers, nurses and contestants." According to Martin, nearly every American city of 50,000 people or more hosted at least one endurance dance marathon at the peak of the craze. Women constituted up to 75 percent of dance marathon audiences.

Dance marathons have occurred in most large cities, such as M.D Crandall’s at Madison Square Garden. Smaller cities didn't have as many social issues compared to the contests in larger cities. Though promoters made less money in smaller towns, they looked for a place where a large crowd could fit in for the dance marathon, and the local community helped advertise. Most promoters were known to have bad business practices, such as not paying the event bills and ditching the contestants. On the other hand, a few promoters like Hal Ross made efforts for the events and paid the bills.

== Rules and format ==
Participants had to remain upright and moving for 45 minutes out of every hour, around the clock.

A live band played at night, while a radio or record player often sufficed during the day. Contestants were expected to dance full-out during the heavily attended evening hours.

Every few hours, a klaxon would sound and couples were allowed 15 minutes of rest in beds that were sometimes set up on the dance floor. These rest areas were segregated by sex. Contestants trained themselves to drop instantly into deep sleep as soon as their bodies touched the cots. Women who did not get up were given smelling salts and sometimes slapped. Male contestants who were slow to wake were often dunked in a tub of ice water. In some cases, couples were linked together by dog chains, like prisoners. "Cot Nights," in which the beds from the rest areas were pulled out into public view so the audience could watch the contestants even during their brief private moments, were popular.

Most marathon promoters fed contestants 12 times a day, although contestants were required to continue the shuffling dance motion while they ate. Although the meals were simple foods like eggs, oatmeal or toast, in a time of great hunger, food was a powerful inducement to contestants. Many marathon contestants reported that, despite the constant motion, 12 meals a day meant that they actually gained weight.

Dancers could often be seen dozing off while their partners held them up to keep their knees from hitting the ground (which would result in disqualification). To encourage lagging couples to continue moving, the floor judge sometimes used a ruler to flick the legs of contestants who were not shuffling with sufficient alacrity. Tasks such as eating, bathing, shaving, and reading the paper could be done while dancing. In her first autobiography, June Havoc described how the contestants shaved onstage, wrote letters, washed themselves, ate while keeping their feet moving, and even had sex under blankets on the dance floor. As the marathon wore on and contestants' stamina withered, they could be forced into footraces, or risk elimination.

Competitors used sponsorship to generate extra cash. Local businesses paid these couples a small stipend in exchange for wearing the company’s name as they competed. Marathoners also sold autographed picture postcards of themselves to the fans; the price was usually 10 cents. “Dancingly yours,” many read.

The audience stayed for the contest as long as they desired after paying the 25-cent admission fee. During the Great Depression, many Americans dealing with lost jobs stayed home listening to dance marathons that often lasted for weeks or months. Marathons took on an almost theatrical role for spectators, who gained a sadistic sense of pleasure from watching the participants physically suffer. Tickets were relatively affordable, and the events provided cheap entertainment, although the public wasn't aware they were staged and dramatized. Marathons were usually somewhat rigged, or at least stacked, toward certain couples. Promoters' profits came from the spectators, returning night after night, cash in hand, to follow the action.

== Opposition towards dance marathons ==
At the time of the dance marathon boom, many churches still considered dancing sinful. Social dancing was still scandalous enough for some promoters to call dance marathons by the more palatable name of "walkathons".

Movie theater owners also objected to dance marathons, as dance marathons were a strong business competitor during the Great Depression.

As the dance marathon wore on and contestants became exhausted, contestants engaged in full-body contact rather than more distant social dance positions. This increased the feeling among some that dance marathons were licentious.

Some objected for humanitarian reasons. They believed it was wrong to charge money for the dubious privilege of watching people suffer. Extreme fatigue could compromise contestants' mental state and cause them to act out in disturbing ways.

Police also believed that marathons attracted an undesirable element to their towns.

On April 14, 1923, Homer Morehouse, aged 27, collapsed and died on the dance floor after dancing with his partner for 87 consecutive hours. Soon after, the City of Boston banned dance marathons.

In 1928, Gladys Lenz danced for 19 straight hours at a Seattle marathon despite being punched in the face by a partner who appeared to be suffering from fatigue-induced psychosis. The couple received $50 (equivalent to $938 in 2025) for coming fifth, while the winning couple won $1,000 (equivalent to $18,750 in 2025). Lenz attempted suicide soon after. Within the year, Seattle banned dance marathons.

Over time, the novelty of dance marathons wore off; and, by the late 1930s, many local authorities banned dance marathons.

Professional performers began to join the dance marathons and competed against authentic amateurs.

== Notable people from the dance marathon craze ==
Callum deVillier and Vonny Kuchinski of Minneapolis took first prize in a marathon at Somerville, Massachusetts, after dancing for five months in 1933. The couple won $1000. A headstone in Section 11 of Minneapolis’s Lakewood Cemetery reads: "deVillier, World Champion Marathon Dancer 3,780 continuous hours."

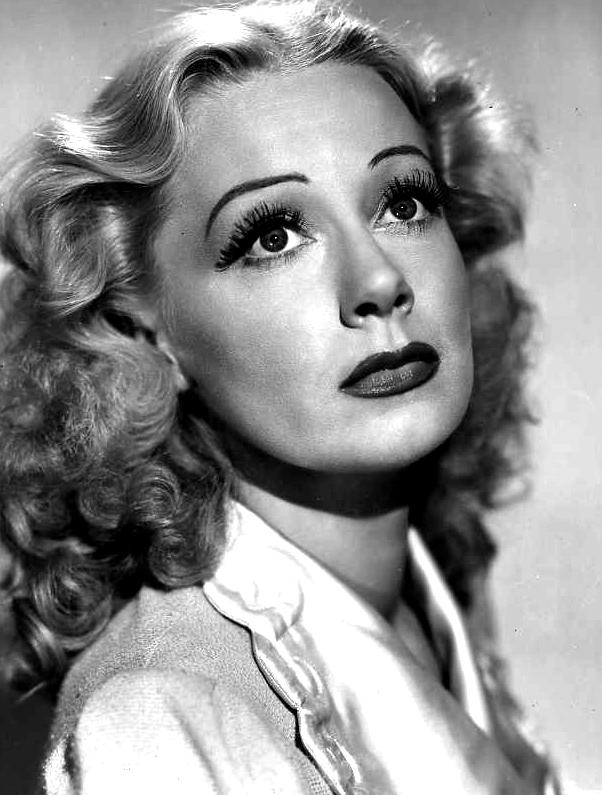
Photo of June Havoc

Vaudeville and Broadway star June Havoc began competing in dance marathons professionally at the age of 14. Havoc's longest dance marathon was reportedly 3,000 hours, or more than four months of staying on her feet and sleeping only in 15-minute intervals. Havoc also wrote the stage play Marathon '33 based on her experiences.

Novelist and screenwriter Horace McCoy worked as a bouncer at several dance marathons. He used this experience to write They Shoot Horses, Don't They?, which was eventually adapted into a film of the same name.

Singer Anita O'Day dropped out of school at age 14 to be a professional marathon dancer. Her marathon dance career ended two years later when a truant officer spotted her and sent her back to school. Her last big event was in Springfield, Illinois, where she and her partner danced for 97 days and came in second.

Guinness World records credits Indian Srushti Sudhir Jagtap (16 years old at the time, the event's minimum age to be considered for the record) for the longest dance marathon by an individual, achieving a time of 127 hours in 2023, dancing Kathak most of her time during the attempt.

== Dance marathons for charity ==
Over 250 colleges and high schools in the United States participate in dance marathons of some sort to raise money for children's hospitals. Some raise money under the Children's Miracle Network, and sometimes with their help, while others are entirely student-run and operate to benefit partnered charities. Each year, students organize and host different types of dance marathon events in which participants stand on their feet for 12–46 hours straight.

Some US student-run dance marathons include:

=== Penn State IFC/Panhellenic Dance Marathon (THON) ===
The Penn State IFC/Panhellenic Dance Marathon, commonly referred to as THON, is a 46-hour dance marathon which takes place every February in the Bryce Jordan Center at Pennsylvania State University to raise money to combat pediatric cancer. THON was started in 1973 by the university's Interfraternity and Panhellenic Councils and in its first year raised more than $2,000. Today, it is the largest student-run philanthropy in the world, with over 16,500 student volunteers and 400 student organizations, and has raised over $254 million since 1977. In 2011, THON raised $9,563,016.09, in 2013, $12,374,034.46 and in 2014, $13,343,517.33. In 2020, THON raised $11,696,942.38. Since 2022, THON has set a new fundraising record each year, most recently raising $18,841,726.53 in 2026. The money raised is donated to the Four Diamonds Fund, a charity devoted to defeating pediatric cancer through research and treats patients at the Penn State Hershey Medical Center Children's Hospital.

=== Northwestern University Dance Marathon (NUDM) ===
Founded in 1975, Northwestern University Dance Marathon, commonly referred to as NUDM, is one of the nation's largest student-run philanthropies. The event unites more than 1,500 students, faculty, and staff to participate in the 30-hour dance-a-thon at the end of the winter quarter in early March. Unlike other Dance Marathons, NUDM changes which charity it primarily supports from year to year. The primary beneficiary is chosen each May, and will receive 90% of all funds raised throughout the year. The other 10% is donated to the Evanston Community Foundation (ECF), which then uses this gift to allocate grants to local Evanston charities. NUDM 2020 will be the 23rd year where ECF has been the secondary beneficiary. With 1,000 dancers and over 500 committee members who work throughout the year to help organize the event and raise awareness, NUDM is a Northwestern tradition. In 2014, NUDM raised its highest total to date, $1,385,273 to benefit Team Joseph. In 45 years, NUDM raised more than $20 million for over 30 charities.

=== Indiana University Dance Marathon (IUDM) ===
The Indiana University Dance Marathon, commonly known as IU Dance Marathon or IUDM, is a 36-hour Dance Marathon that takes place every November at Indiana University with the purpose of raising both funding and awareness for pediatric care. In 1991, student Jill Stewart started IU Dance Marathon in honor of her friend, Ryan White, who died from AIDS the year before. Since then, IUDM has raised over $32 million for Riley Hospital for Children, including $4,203,326.23 during the 2017 marathon year. IUDM currently supports the Wells Center for Pediatric Research and Riley Hospital for Children.

=== University of Iowa Dance Marathon (UIDM) ===
The University of Iowa Dance Marathon was founded in 1994 and provides financial and emotional support to pediatric oncology and bone marrow transplant patients treated at the University of Iowa Stead Family Children's Hospital. Over the past 24 years, the university's largest student organization has raised $24,548,226.30 for the children's hospital. In 2018, UIDM raised a total of $3,011,015.24, making it the second Miracle Network Dance Marathon in the country to raise over three million dollars. After a ten-year, $5 million leadership gift to the University of Iowa Stead Family Children's Hospital's building campaign, the 11th floor was named the UI Dance Marathon Pediatric Cancer Center. Since then, the student-run group has donated over $2.2 million to create the UI Dance Marathon Pediatric Oncology Targeted Therapy Program and $2 million to establish the first student-funded chair position at the University of Iowa, the UI Dance Marathon Chair in Pediatric Oncology, Clinical and Translational Research.

=== Florida State University Dance Marathon (DMFSU) ===
With more than one beneficiary, FSU's dance marathon benefits children's causes and has raised more than $6 million since 1996. The 2018 campaign raised a total of $2,152,382 for Children's Miracle Network, surpassing the previous year's record by $322,214.

== Media ==
- Hard to Handle (film) directed by Mervyn LeRoy, 1933.
- They Shoot Horses, Don't They? (novel) by Horace McCoy, 1935.
- Marathon '33 (play) by June Havoc, 1963.
- They Shoot Horses, Don't They? (film) directed by Sydney Pollack, 1969.
- One for the Money (The Golden Girls, Season 3, Episode 2), 1987
- They Shoot Gilmores, Don't They? (Gilmore Girls, Season 3, Episode 7), 2002
- Alexander McQueen's Spring 2004 Ready to Wear
- The Gang Dances Their Asses Off (It's Always Sunny in Philadelphia, Season 3, Episode 15), 2007
- Dusty Flowerpot Cabaret's Hard Time Hit Parade (play) by Kat Single-Dain, 2011
- Dance Until You Drop (play), 2018
- No Miracles Here (play), 2019
- Babylon Berlin: Season 4, Episode 3 (TV series), 2022

== See also ==
- Dancing mania
- Roller derby, which originated as a 3000-mile roller skating race, inspired by a series of walkathons promoted by Leo Seltzer.
- Cakewalk
