= Horace McCoy =

American writer (1897–1955)

- Born: Horace Stanley McCoy; April 14, 1897; Pegram, Tennessee
- Died: December 15, 1955 (aged 58); Beverly Hills, California
- Occupation: Novelist
- Writing career
- Genres: Literary fiction; crime fiction; hardboiled
- Notable work: They Shoot Horses, Don't They?

Horace Stanley McCoy (April 14, 1897 – December 15, 1955) was an American writer whose mostly hardboiled stories took place during the Great Depression. His best-known novel is They Shoot Horses, Don't They? (1935), which was made into a movie of the same name in 1969, fourteen years after McCoy's death.

== Early life ==
McCoy was born in Pegram, Tennessee. During World War I he served in the United States Army Air Corps, flying several missions behind enemy lines as a bombardier and reconnaissance photographer. He was wounded and received the Croix de Guerre for heroism from the government of France.

== Post-war ==
From 1919 to 1930, he worked as a sports editor for the Dallas Journal in Texas. In 1924, he did the play-by-play of a baseball game for radio broadcast. In the late 1920s he began getting stories published in various pulp mystery magazines.

He performed as an actor with the Dallas Little Theater. He had a prominent role in Philip Barry's The Youngest. He described the acting experience in a Dallas Morning News piece. His acting was good enough for him to be cast in the leads in Molnár's Liliom (1928), and Sidney Howard's They Knew What They Wanted (1929). A 1928 column in the Morning News described McCoy as "a sort of enfant terrible of journalism and amateur theatricals in Dallas."

== California ==
When Oliver Hinsdell, director of the Dallas Little Theater from 1923 to 1931, was engaged as an acting coach for MGM, McCoy followed him to Hollywood to become a film actor. He appeared in a short, "The Hollywood Handicap" (1932), then moved on to screenwriting.

McCoy also worked a number of odd jobs. For example, he washed cars, picked lettuce in the Imperial Valley, and served as a bouncer at the Santa Monica pier.

== Novels and film work ==
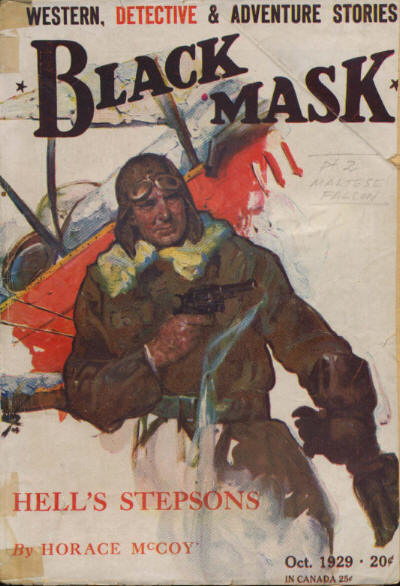
October 1929 issue of Black Mask magazine, featuring Horace McCoy

The bouncer job inspired They Shoot Horses, Don't They?, the story of a Depression-era dance marathon. His novel I Should Have Stayed Home dealt with the experiences of a young Southern actor attempting to find work in 1930s Hollywood. Another novel, No Pockets in a Shroud, featured a heroic, misunderstood reporter as the protagonist.

In 1948, McCoy published the hard-boiled classic Kiss Tomorrow Goodbye. The story is narrated by the amoral protagonist, Ralph Cotter. It was made into a James Cagney movie of the same name. Its influence—McCoy's influence—on the French filmmakers who love pulp fiction and film noir can be seen, for example, in Jean-Luc Godard's film Made in U.S.A., in which one character is reading this novel in its French translation, Adieu la vie, adieu l'amour.

In Hollywood, McCoy wrote westerns, crime melodramas, and other films for various studios. McCoy worked with such movie directors as Henry Hathaway, Raoul Walsh, and Nicholas Ray. He was also an uncredited script assistant for King Kong (1933).

The film Bad for Each Other (1953), for which McCoy received co-screenwriting credit (with Irving Wallace), was based on his novel Scalpel (1952) which was uncredited.

McCoy was also recognized for the story, in the closing credits, of the Samantha Crawford character debut in the Maverick television series titled "According to Hoyle" starring James Garner, Diane Brewster and Leo Gordon.

== Personal life ==
He was married to Helen Vinmont McCoy (1913–1964), with whom he had two sons, Horace Stanley McCoy II and Peter McCoy; and a daughter, Amanda McCoy. He died in Beverly Hills, California of a heart attack.

== Works ==
=== Novels ===
- They Shoot Horses, Don't They? (1935)
- No Pockets in a Shroud (1937; revised 1948)
- I Should Have Stayed Home (1938)
- Kiss Tomorrow Goodbye (1948)
- Scalpel (1952)
- Corruption City (unfinished; completed by a ghostwriter and published posthumously in 1959)

=== Short stories ===
All-Star Detective Stories:

- "Two Smart Guys" (November 1931)

Black Mask:

- "The Devil Man" (December 1927)
- "Dirty Work" (September 1929)
- "Hell's Stepsons" (October 1929)
- "Renegades of the Rio" (December 1929)
- "The Little Black Book" (January 1930)
- "Frost Rides Alone" (March 1930)
- "Somewhere in Mexico" (July 1930)
- "The Gun-Runners" (August 1930)
- "The Mailed Fist" (December 1930)
- "Headfirst into Hell" (May 1931)
- "The Mopper Up" (November 1931)
- "The Trail to the Tropics" (March 1932)
- "The Golden Rule" (June 1932)
- "Murder in Error" (August 1932)
- "Wings Over Texas" (October 1932)
- "Flight at Sunrise" (May 1934)
- "Somebody Must Die" (October 1934)

Detective-Dragnet Magazine:

- "Killer's Killer" (December 1930)
- "Death Alley" (March 1931)
- "Juggernaut of Justice" (August 1931)

Detective Action Stories:

- "Night Club" (February 1931)

Man Stories:

- "A Matter of Honor" (July 1931)

Nickel Detective:

- "Trapped By Silver" (August 1933)

Popular Fiction:

- "Bombs for the General" (February 1932)
