= They Shoot Horses, Don't They? (novel) =

1935 novel by Horace McCoy

- First edition
- Author: Horace McCoy
- Language: English
- Genre: Tragedy
- Publisher: Simon & Schuster
- Publication date: 1935
- Publication place: United States
- Media type: Print (hardcover)
- Pages: 121

They Shoot Horses, Don't They? is a novel written by Horace McCoy and first published in 1935. The story mainly concerns a dance marathon during the Great Depression. It was adapted into Sydney Pollack's 1969 film of the same name.

== Plot ==
The story follows the narrator, Robert Syverten, a naive young man in Hollywood who dreams of being a film director.

The story begins with Robert's sentencing for murder. He confesses that he "killed her", and that he does not "have a leg to stand on." He is advised to beg for mercy from the court. The story of his relationship with the girl he killed, Gloria Beatty, is thereafter intercut after every few chapters with short excerpts from the judge's sentencing. The excerpts of the judge's words are written in larger and larger type until the last page of the book concludes with the words, written in small print: "And may God have mercy on your soul."

Robert meets Gloria on a morning when they have both failed to get parts as extras. She talks him into participating in a dance marathon contest. Like Robert, she is struggling to find work in Hollywood and believes the contest may be a way to get noticed by studio producers or movie stars. Gloria and Robert enter the contest, which is held at a large amusement pier on the beach in Santa Monica.

The contests are long and grueling affairs, taking place over several weeks. Contestants dance for an hour and fifty minutes, then receive a ten-minute break. One hundred and forty-four couples start the contest. Robert and Gloria, like most of the contestants, are young, jobless, and drawn as much by the free food as by the $1,000 prize money.

From the start, Gloria tells Robert that she wishes she were dead, a point she repeats in most of their conversations. Her parents are dead. She ran away to Dallas from a farm in West Texas where her uncle always made passes at her. In Dallas, she tried to commit suicide, then ran away to Hollywood with dreams of being in movies, but is finding only rejection. Robert considers her plain-looking and unlikely to find work as an actress. She tells Robert frequently that she does not have the courage to kill herself.

The promoters of the contest try various schemes to increase attendance. They publicize the arrest of a contestant for murder. Every evening, they stage an elimination derby, in which the couples speed-walk around a track, the last-place couple being disqualified. The promoters stage a marriage of two contestants, who then lose a derby and should be eliminated. Instead, the promoters disqualify another couple.

As the dance goes on, into the second and third week, the crowds grow larger. Newspapers cover the contest. Some couples receive sponsorships from local businesses, usually in the form of clothes. Hollywood personalities arrive to watch and are announced by the promoters. Gloria goads Robert into speaking with a famous director, Frank Borzage. A woman named Mrs. Layden attends the contest regularly and tells Robert that he and Gloria are her favorite couple. She later gets them a sponsorship.

As the contest grinds on, couples break down physically and drop out. Robert is consumed with claustrophobia and a desire to get outside into the sun. Gloria is tiring and having difficulty walking for the derby without his help.

Gloria curses another male contestant because he will not allow his pregnant partner to get an abortion. Robert learns indirectly that Gloria is having sex with one of the promoters. When Robert tells her of his suspicions, Gloria tells him she does not feel she is worthy of doing anything else. Two elderly women from the local morals society threaten the promoters with shutting down the dance, and Gloria is asked to witness the meeting. Left in the room with Mrs. Higby and Mrs. Witcher, Gloria curses the women as spoiled, interfering hypocrites.

After 879 hours of dancing and with 20 couples remaining, the contest is shut down when there is a murder at the dance hall's bar. A stray bullet kills Mrs. Layden. The promoters decide to give the remaining dancers $50 each for their efforts. Robert and Gloria go outside for the first time in five weeks and sit on the pier looking at the ocean. Gloria takes a pistol out of her bag and asks Robert to shoot her, which he does. He remembers when he was young, and his grandfather shot the beloved family horse, which had broken its leg. The police ask Robert why he shot Gloria, and he answers, "Because she asked me to." The policeman persists. Robert answers, "They shoot horses, don't they?"

== Critical reception ==
McCoy's novel was more popular abroad than in America when it was published at the height of the Depression. The book was read in the existentialist circles of France. Although the novel had been distributed by underground literary groups during World War II, its first French edition did not appear until 1946.

Lee J. Richmond argues: "With the exception of Nathaniel West's Miss Lonelyhearts and The Day of the Locust, McCoy's novel is indisputably the best example of absurdist existentialism in American fiction." In 2011 Anita Sethi for The Guardian wrote: "The brutality of the story is offset by the poetic beauty and precision of McCoy's narrative as it hones in on the thoughts and aspirations of its outsider characters, their troubled voices lingering in the mind. In our world of fleeting reality TV stardom, this stark, urgent novel feels more timely than ever. The novel has remained continuously in print since 1935.

== Adaptations and influence ==
They Shoot Horses, Don't They? was adapted for a film of the same title in 1969, with a screenplay by Robert E. Thompson and James Poe. The film, directed by Sydney Pollack, stars Michael Sarrazin as Robert, Jane Fonda as Gloria, and Gig Young as the dance marathon emcee. It was nominated for nine Academy Awards.

The book's title was parodied by Patrick McManus's 1982 short story collection They Shoot Canoes, Don't They?

In 1983 the novel was adapted by Ray Herman for a stage play that premiered at the Grant Street Theatre in South Melbourne, Victoria, Australia. The play had several revivals in the UK in the 1990s and 2000s (Northern Stage, Newcastle upon Tyne in 1995). In 2001 the novel was again adapted for the stage by Rick Sparks and Gary Carter. Its premiere production for Greenway Arts Alliance in Los Angeles won 17 theatre awards. In 2016 Harvard University performed the Sparks–Carter adaptation. In 2026 the novel was adapted for BBC radio by Kerry Shale.

The fashion designer Alexander McQueen re-created the grueling dance marathon for his ready-to-wear fashion show for his spring 2004 Collection.

Welsh band Racing Cars had an international chart success in 1977 (reaching number 14 in the UK) with "They Shoot Horses, Don't They?", a song with lyrics inspired by the film.

Joe Jackson wrote the line "Enjoy the dance, they don't shoot horses" in his song Cha Cha loco (from the 1984 album Body and Soul).

Linda McQuaig's 1995 book Shooting the Hippo, about the supposed and actual causes of Canada's large government budget deficit at the time, opens with a chapter entitled "They shoot hippos, don't they?" This was in reference to an influential media piece on Canada's deficit which attempted to draw parallels between the Canadian situation and New Zealand's budget crisis a decade earlier. McQuaig claimed an unnamed New Zealand zoo lost its government subsidy and shot its hippo.

They Shoot Horses was the original name of Kevin Abstract's second studio album before it was renamed American Boyfriend: A Suburban Love Story.

== See also ==
- Kiss Tomorrow Goodbye
