= Endurance race =

Endurance race may refer to:

- Human endurance contest
- Endurance riding
- Endurance racing (motorsport)
- Long-distance running
- Long-distance trail
- Long-distance swimming
- Adventure race
- Office chair racing

== See also ==
- Ultra-distance cycling
- Ultramarathon
- Ultra-triathlon
- Ski marathon
