= Office chair racing =

Sport

Office chair racing is an unconventional sport where participants use wheeled office chairs for racing. The sport that dates back to 2008 in Germany has become an informal and formal sport with the most notable event being the Isu-1 Grand Prix in Japan.

== History and origins ==
The origins of Office chair racing come from workplaces where employees used the rolling chairs, to race each other. The races became organized initially in Germany in 2008, when the first German Office Chair Racing Championship, took place in Bad König on April 26. About 70 people participated in the race that went down a steep 560 foot course with ramps and obstacles. Since then the sport has become more popular with races being held in Japan, Switzerland, Belgium and the United States.

== Overview ==
The rules for Office chair racing are that competitors push themselves forward by using their legs while sitting on the chair. Races are mainly divided to sprints, endurance events and obstacle races. The races can be individual, teams and sometimes using modified chairs, rather than ordinary chairs. There are also downhill events which require safety gear and restrict motorized chairs.

== Development and international spread ==
Since 2010, the sport spread throughout the world, with similar events taking place in other European countries, reaching Japan and the United States. The most notable events are:

=== German Office Chair Racing Championship ===
This is an annual championship held in Bad König, Germany and is considered the foundational tournament of the sport. It consists of a downhill course featuring ramps that allows some chair modification but no motorization.

=== World Championship Office Chair Race (Switzerland) ===
The world championship is held in Olten, Switzerland and is open to competitors from all over the world.

=== Isu-1 Grand Prix ===
The Isu-1 Grand Prix is an endurance office chair race originating in 2009 in Kyoto, by Tsuyoshi Tahara. It is a two-hour race consisting of teams of three competing together, using standard office chairs and safety gear.

== See also ==
- Endurance racing
