= Human endurance contest =

Events in which people complete grueling tasks for an extended period of time

A human endurance contest is an event in which people complete mentally or physically grueling tasks for an extended period of time. The contests are exploitative entertainment events which began during the Great Depression in the 1920s-1930s as a means to earn income. Examples include dance marathon or walk-a-thon, cave sitting, pole sitting, marathon swimming, ice sitting, burial artists and other forms of early endurance art.

== Origins ==
According to Professor Carol Martin of New York University, the revival of the Olympic Games created a widespread interest in feats of strength, endurance contests, and world records that led to dance and other endurance marathons. Almost any activity could be transformed into some type of endurance contest, as long as it was done for an extended period of time. The contests ranged from activities like dancing, swimming, and rocking-chair-sitting, to oddities such as sitting on a flagpole or in a tree.

== Golden Age ==
Endurance contests gained popularity during the Great Depression in large part because of the hard financial times. Contests offered cash prizes equivalent to a year's salary. They provided contestants and spectators food, shelter and the opportunity to earn cash prizes at a time when many people needed a free meal.

== Decline ==
In the early 1930s, the public began to grow weary of the endurance contests that had devolved into unimaginative, and sometimes bizarre, annoyances. In April of 1935, San Bernardino County passed an ordinance regulating endurance contests of all types, and placed onerous rules on the events. The State of California followed suit in June of 1935, by enacting statewide regulations on endurance contests. Contests became a fad again briefly in the 1960s before declining once again.

== Examples ==
- Burial artists
- Dance marathon
- Endurance art
- Marathon swimming
- Pole sitting
- Cave sitting
- Office chair racing
