= It's Hard to Believe It: The Amazing World of Joe Meek =

Compilation album by various artists
- Released: 19 September 1995
- Genre: Pop
- Length: 53:22
- Label: Razor & Tie
- Compiler: Dennis Diken

Professional ratings
Review scores
Source	Rating
AllMusic	5/5 stars
The Encyclopedia of Popular Music	3/5 stars
Entertainment Weekly	B
Rolling Stone	2.5/5 stars
Spin	8/10

It's Hard to Believe It: The Amazing World of Joe Meek is a compilation album of songs produced by English record producer Joe Meek and released in the 1960s. The album was released on 19 September 1995 on the Razor & Tie label, making it the first collection of Meek's music to be released in the United States. It was compiled and annotated by Dennis Diken, the drummer for the Smithereens, who first became interested in Meek's work through the song "Telstar", a song released by the Tornados in 1962 that Meek had written and produced. Diken told the Phoenix New Times' Serene Dominic that he held a private party to celebrate the album's release, featuring a performance by a band whose members included Marshall Crenshaw and Richard Barone, as well as Diken himself.

== Track listing ==
No.	Title	artist	Length
1.	"Telstar"	The Tornados	3:18
2.	"Johnny Remember Me"	John Leyton	2:40
3.	"Tribute to Buddy Holly"	Mike Berry and the Outlaws	3:00
4.	"Chick A 'Roo"	Ricky Wayne and the Flee-Rakkers	1:51
5.	"Night of the Vampire"	The Moontrekkers	2:49
6.	"Paradise Garden"	Peter Jay	2:42
7.	"My Friend Bobby"	Pamela Blue	2:10
8.	"Swingin' Low"	The Outlaws	2:03
9.	"Valley Of The Saroos"	The Blue Men	2:50
10.	"The Bublight"	The Blue Men	2:41
11.	"Til the Following Night"	Screaming Lord Sutch and the Savages	3:45
12.	"Just Like Eddie"	Heinz	2:37
13.	"North Wind"	Houston Wells and the Marksmen	2:34
14.	"Huskie Team"	The Saints	1:59
15.	"Have I the Right?"	The Honeycombs	2:57
16.	"My Baby Doll"	Mike Berry & the Outlaws	1:55
17.	"Something I've Got to Tell You"	Glenda Collins	2:40
18.	"I Take It That We're Through"	Riot Squad	2:46
19.	"Lost Planet"	The Thunderbolts	3:04
20.	"It's Hard to Believe It"	Glenda Collins	3:01
