= Telstar: The Joe Meek Story =

- UK cinema poster
- Directed by: Nick Moran
- Written by: James Hicks; Nick Moran
- Produced by: David Reid; Adam Bohling; Simon Jordan
- Starring: Con O'Neill; Kevin Spacey; Pam Ferris; JJ Feild; James Corden; Tom Burke; Ralf Little; Sid Mitchell
- Cinematography: Peter Wignall
- Edited by: Alex Marsh
- Music by: Ilan Eshkeri, with songs by Joe Meek and others
- Production company: Aspiration Films
- Distributed by: G2 Pictures
- Release dates: October 25, 2008 (London Film Festival); June 19, 2009 (United Kingdom)
- Running time: 119 minutes
- Country: United Kingdom
- Language: English
- Budget: £1.2 million

Telstar: The Joe Meek Story is a 2008 film adaptation of James Hicks' and Nick Moran's play Telstar, about record producer Joe Meek, which opened at the New Ambassadors Theatre in London's West End in June 2005. The film is directed by Moran and stars Con O'Neill, who also played Joe Meek in the original play, while Kevin Spacey plays Meek's business partner, Major Wilfred Banks.

== Plot ==
The film tells the story of record producer Joe Meek, the songwriter-producer behind the 1960s hits "Have I the Right?", "Just Like Eddie" and "Johnny Remember Me". The film charts Meek's initial success with the multi-million-selling record "Telstar"; his homosexuality, which was illegal in the UK at the time; and his struggles with debt, paranoia and depression, which culminated in the killing of his landlady Violet Shenton and himself, on 3 February 1967.

== Cast ==
- Con O'Neill as Joe Meek
- Kevin Spacey as Major Wilfred Banks
- Pam Ferris as Mrs Violet Shenton
- JJ Feild as Heinz Burt
- James Corden as Clem Cattini
- Tom Burke as Geoff Goddard
- Ralf Little as Chas Hodges
- Sid Mitchell as Patrick Pink (aka Robbie Duke)
- Mathew Baynton as Ritchie Blackmore
- Shaun Evans as Billy Kuy
- Callum Dixon as John Leyton
- Tom Harper as Alan Caddy
- Jon Lee as Billy Fury
- Nigel Harman as Jess Conrad
- Carl Barât as Gene Vincent
- Justin Hawkins as Screaming Lord Sutch
- Mathew Krug (Matthew Kiziltan) as Lionel Howard (Joe Meek’s irl boyfriend, though not portrayed as such in the movie)
- Nick Moran as Alex Meek
- Jess Conrad as Larry Parnes
- Clem Cattini as Chauffeur
- Chas Hodges as Mr Brolin
- John Leyton as Sir Edward
- Robbie Duke as Stagehand
- Mike Sarne as Backstage Manager
- David Hayler as John Peel
- Craig Vye as Mitch Mitchell
- Joan Hodges as Biddy Meek
- Jimmy Carr as Gentleman
- Jim Field Smith as Ken Howard
- Marcus Brigstocke as Alan Blaikley
- Rita Tushingham as Essex Medium
- Gary Whelan as Detective
- Jack Roth as Youth
- Guy Lewis as Charles Blackwell (Music Arranger)
- Alan Scally as George Bellamy
- Dominic Arnall as Roger LaVern

Some of those portrayed in the film assisted with the production, or appeared in minor roles playing older characters alongside the actors portraying their younger selves. Singer Chas Hodges, who appears as Meek's enraged neighbour, complaining about the noise by banging a dustbin lid, recommended Carl Barât of the Libertines for the role of Gene Vincent, whilst Tornados drummer Clem Cattini appears in a scene as John Leyton's chauffeur and provided advice on set design. Leyton himself plays the fictional "Sir Edward", and singer-actor Jess Conrad plays pop manager Larry Parnes. Meek's young protégée, Patrick Pink (now known as Robbie Duke), appears as a stagehand.

== Criticism ==
After the premiere, Robbie Duke, formerly Patrick Pink, who had been Meek's office assistent and was present when Meek killed his landlady and himself, complained at how the filmmakers had portrayed his relationship with Joe Meek, suggesting that they had been lovers. He expressed his anger to the press, and posted an open letter to the filmmakers on the Internet, where he demanded a public apology. Similarly, the family of the late Heinz Burt also criticized the film for portraying him as Meek's lover, claiming that Heinz Burt did not have a close relationship with Meek, and was also not homosexual, as portrayed in the film.

Scenes portraying Meek falling in love with and living together with his avouched real life boyfriend Lionel Howard had been filmed and can be found in the deleted scenes of the Bluray releases for the Denish and Norwegian market only, but have been cut from the movie, leaving Howard only appearing in a single platonic scene that does not identify him as Meeks ex-/boyfriend or one of the most important people in his life.

== Critical reception ==
Siobhan Synnot of the Scotland on Sunday praised the film because it did not employ the usual "cinematic gloss". She opined that it begins with a humorous tone but transforms into a "harrowing film", adding that Telstar "knocks the wind out of the sails" of The Boat That Rocked in that the performances are "more substantial and engaged". Synnot concluded that "like Meek's records, Telstar is raw, fatalistic and somewhat crudely put together, but it also boasts both-barrels, mega-watt energy." The Guardian reviewer called it "fascinating but patchy".

== See also ==
- A Life in the Death of Joe Meek
