= Ritchie Blackmore =

British guitarist (born 1945)

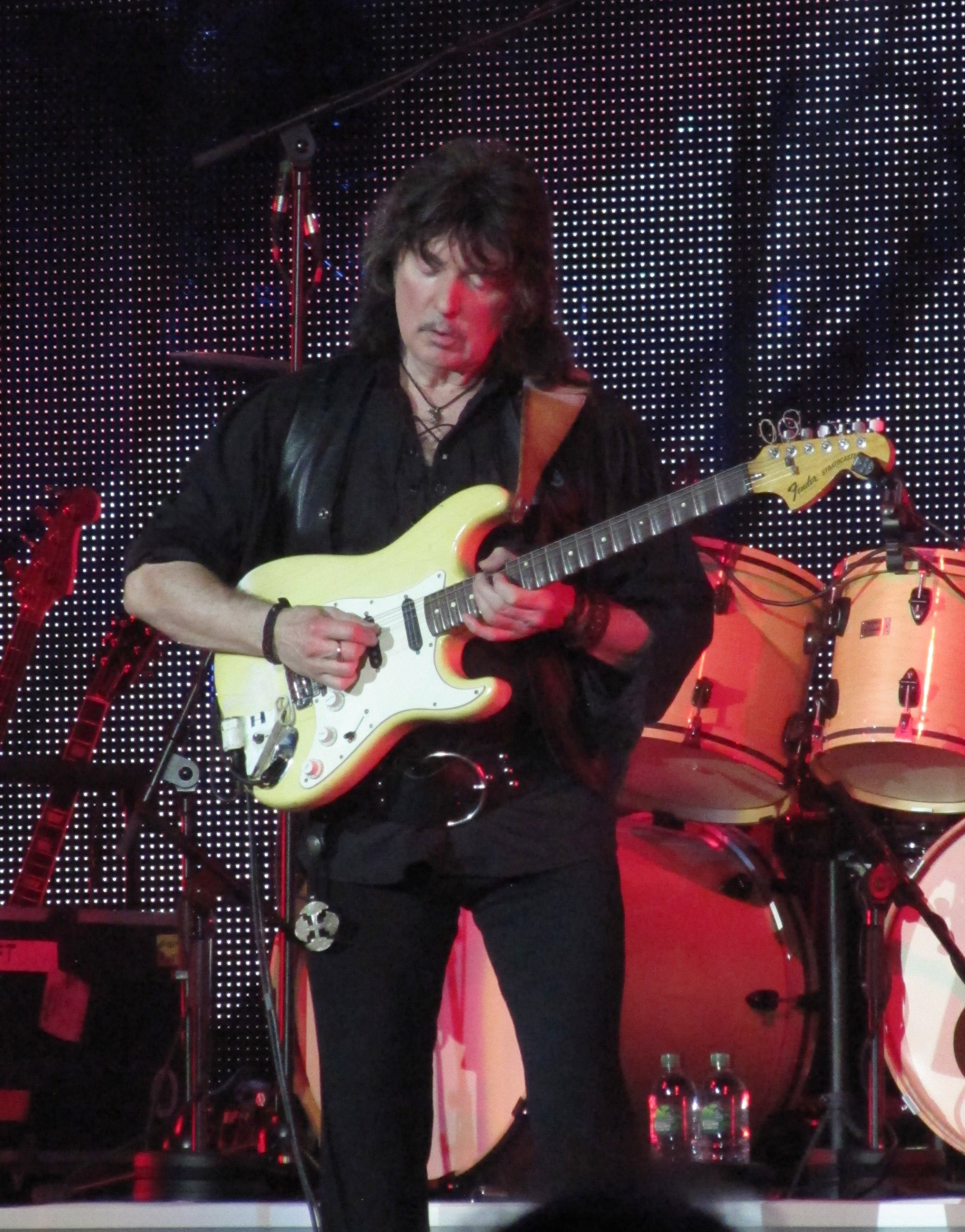
- Blackmore performing with Rainbow in 2017

Background information
- Also known as: The Man in Black
- Born: Richard Hugh Blackmore; 14 April 1945 (age 81); Weston-super-Mare, Somerset, England
- Origin: Heston, Middlesex, England
- Genres: Hard rock; heavy metal; folk rock; progressive rock
- Occupations: Musician; songwriter
- Instruments: Guitar
- Years active: 1960–present
- Member of: Blackmore's Night
- Formerly of: Rainbow, Deep Purple
- Spouses: Margit Volkmar (m. 1964; div. 1969) Bärbel (m. 1969; div. 1971) Amy Rothman (m. 1981; div. 1983) Candice Night (m. 2008)
- Website: blackmoresnight.com

Richard Hugh Blackmore (born 14 April 1945) is an English guitarist, who was a co-founding member of Deep Purple, Rainbow and Blackmore's Night. In the 1960s, he began his professional career in bands such as the Outlaws and Screaming Lord Sutch & the Savages, and worked as a session guitarist for singers such as Glenda Collins, Heinz, Neil Christian and others.

Blackmore has been known for playing both classically influenced and blues-based solos. He is cited by publications such as Guitar World and Rolling Stone as one of the greatest and most influential guitar players of all time. He was inducted into the Rock and Roll Hall of Fame as a member of Deep Purple in April 2016.

== Early life ==
Blackmore was born at Allendale Nursing Home in Weston-super-Mare, Somerset, the second son of Lewis J. Blackmore and Violet (née Short). The family moved to Heston, Middlesex, when Blackmore was two. He was 11 when his father gave him a guitar on the condition that he learn to play properly, so he took classical guitar lessons for one year.

In an interview with Sounds magazine in 1979, Blackmore said that he started the guitar because he wanted to be like British musician Tommy Steele, who used to just jump around and play. Blackmore loathed school and hated his teachers. He said he would always get caned for speaking in class, which traumatized him to the point he had difficulty in talking to people in subsequent years. Blackmore became fed up with formal education, thinking that if he were to excel in his studies, he would end up being like his teachers.

Blackmore left school at age 15 and started work as an apprentice radio mechanic at nearby Heathrow Airport. He took electric guitar lessons from session guitarist Big Jim Sullivan.

== Career ==
=== 1960s ===
In 1960, he began to work as a session player for Joe Meek's music productions and performed in several bands. He was initially a member of the instrumental band the Outlaws, who played in both studio recordings and live concerts and like many bands of the era, used other names (such as The Rally Rounders and The Chaps) to secure multiple repeat gigs. Otherwise, in mainly studio recordings, he backed singer Glenda Collins, German-born rock and roll singer Heinz (playing on his top ten hit "Just Like Eddie" and "Beating Of My Heart"), and others. Thereafter, in mainly live concerts, he backed horror-themed singer Screaming Lord Sutch, beat singer Neil Christian, and others.

Blackmore joined a band-to-be called Roundabout in late 1967 after receiving an invitation from Chris Curtis while living in Hamburg and arriving at the Curtis flat to be greeted by Curtis' flatmate, Jon Lord. Curtis originated the concept of the band, but was forced out before the band fully formed. After the line-up for Roundabout was complete in April 1968, Blackmore is credited with suggesting the new name Deep Purple, as it was his grandmother's favourite song. Deep Purple's early sound leaned on psychedelic and progressive rock, but also included cover versions of 1960s pop songs. This "Mark One" line-up featuring singer Rod Evans and bass player Nick Simper lasted until mid-1969 and produced three studio albums. During this period, organist Jon Lord appeared to be the leader of the band, and wrote much of their original material.

=== 1970s ===
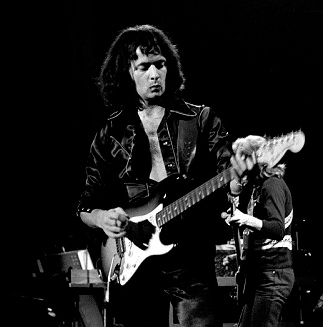
Live in Norway, 1977

The first studio album from Purple's second line-up, In Rock (1970), signalled a transition in the band's sound from progressive rock to hard rock. This "Mark Two" line-up featuring rock singer Ian Gillan and bassist Roger Glover lasted until mid-1973, producing four studio albums (two of which reached No. 1 in the UK), and one live double album. During this period, the band's songs primarily came out of their jam sessions, so songwriting credits were shared by the five members. Blackmore later stated, "I didn't give a damn about song construction. I just wanted to make as much noise and play as fast and as loud as possible."

Guitarist Steve Vai was more complimentary about Blackmore's role in developing song ideas: "He was able to bring blues to rock playing unlike anybody else."

The third Deep Purple line-up featured David Coverdale on vocals and Glenn Hughes on bass and vocals. Songwriting was now more fragmented, as opposed to the band compositions from the Mark Two era. This "Mark Three" line-up lasted until mid-1975 and produced two studio albums and one live album . Blackmore left the band to front a new group, Rainbow. In 1974, Blackmore took cello lessons from Hugh McDowell (of ELO). Blackmore later stated that when playing a different musical instrument, he found it refreshing because there is a sense of adventure not knowing exactly what chord he's playing or what key he is in.

Blackmore originally planned to make a solo album, but instead in 1975 formed his own band, Ritchie Blackmore's Rainbow, later shortened to Rainbow. Featuring vocalist Ronnie James Dio and his blues rock backing band Elf as studio musicians, this first line-up never performed live. The band's debut album, Ritchie Blackmore's Rainbow, was released in 1975. Rainbow's music was partly inspired by elements of medieval and baroque music since Blackmore started to play cello for musical composition. During this period, Blackmore wrote a crucial part of Dio's basic melodies, particularly on their debut album. Shortly after the first album was recorded, Blackmore recruited new backing musicians to record the second album Rising (1976), and the following live album, On Stage (1977). Rising was originally billed as "Blackmore's Rainbow" in the US. After the next studio album's release and supporting tour in 1978, Dio left Rainbow due to "creative differences" with Blackmore, who desired to move in a more commercial sounding direction.

Blackmore continued with Rainbow, and in 1979 the band released a new album titled Down To Earth, which featured R&B singer Graham Bonnet. During song composition, Bonnet says that he wrote his vocal melodies based upon the lyrics of bassist Roger Glover. The album contained the band's first top 10 UK hit singles "Since You Been Gone" (penned by Russ Ballard) and "All Night Long".

=== 1980s ===
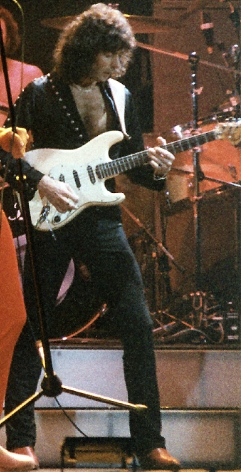
In San Francisco, 1985

The next Rainbow album, Difficult to Cure (1981), introduced vocalist Joe Lynn Turner. The instrumental title track from this album was an arrangement of Beethoven's Ninth Symphony with additional music. Blackmore once said, "I found the blues too limiting, and classical was too disciplined. I was always stuck in a musical no man's land." The album marked the further commercialisation of the band's sound with Blackmore describing at the time a liking for the AOR band, Foreigner. The music was consciously radio-targeted in a more AOR style, resulting in some degree of alienation with many of Rainbow's earlier fans. Rainbow's next studio album was Straight Between the Eyes (1982) and included the single "Stone Cold". It would be followed by the album Bent Out of Shape (1983), which featured the single "Street of Dreams". In 1983, Rainbow were also nominated for a Grammy Award for the Blackmore-penned instrumental ballad track "Anybody There". Rainbow disbanded in 1984. A then-final Rainbow album, Finyl Vinyl, was patched together from live tracks and the B-sides of various singles.

In 1984, Blackmore joined a reunion of the former Deep Purple "Mark Two" line-up and recorded new material. This reunion line-up recorded two studio albums, Perfect Strangers (1984) and The House of Blue Light (1987), and released the live album Nobody's Perfect (1988).

=== 1990s ===
The next Deep Purple line-up recorded one album titled Slaves and Masters (1990), which featured former Rainbow vocalist Joe Lynn Turner. During song composition, Turner wrote his vocal melodies. Subsequently, the "Mark Two" line-up reunited for a second time in late 1992 and produced one studio album, The Battle Rages On.... During the follow-up promotional tour, Blackmore quit the band for good in November 1993. Guitarist Joe Satriani was brought in to complete the remaining tour dates.

Blackmore reformed Rainbow with new members in 1994. This Rainbow line-up, featuring singer Doogie White, lasted until 1997 and produced one album titled Stranger in Us All in 1995. It was originally intended to be a solo album but due to the record company pressures the record was billed as Ritchie Blackmore's Rainbow. This was Rainbow's eighth studio album, made after a gap of 12 years since Bent out of Shape. A world tour including South America followed. Rainbow was disbanded once again after playing its final concert in 1997. Blackmore later said, "I didn't want to tour very much."

Over the years Rainbow had gone through many personnel changes with no two studio albums featuring the same line-up: Blackmore was the sole constant band member. Rainbow achieved moderate success; the band's worldwide sales are estimated at more than 28 million album copies, including 4 million copies sold in the US.

In 1995, Blackmore, with his girlfriend Candice Night as vocalist, began working on a folk rock project, which later became the debut album Shadow of the Moon (1997) for their duo Blackmore's Night. Blackmore once portrayed their artistic characteristics as "Mike Oldfield plus Enya". Blackmore mostly used acoustic guitar, to back Night's delicate vocal melodies, which he often wrote. Night said, "When he sings, he sings only for me, in private". As a result, his musical approach shifted to vocalist-centred sounds, and their recorded output is a mixture of original and cover materials. The band's musical style is heavily inspired by medieval music blended with Night's lyrics, which often feature themes of love and medieval times. The second release, entitled Under a Violet Moon (1999) continued in the same folk-rock style, with Night's vocals remaining a prominent feature of the band's style. The title track's lyrics were partly written by Blackmore. "Violet" was his mother's first name and "Moon" was his grandmother's surname.

=== 2000s–present ===
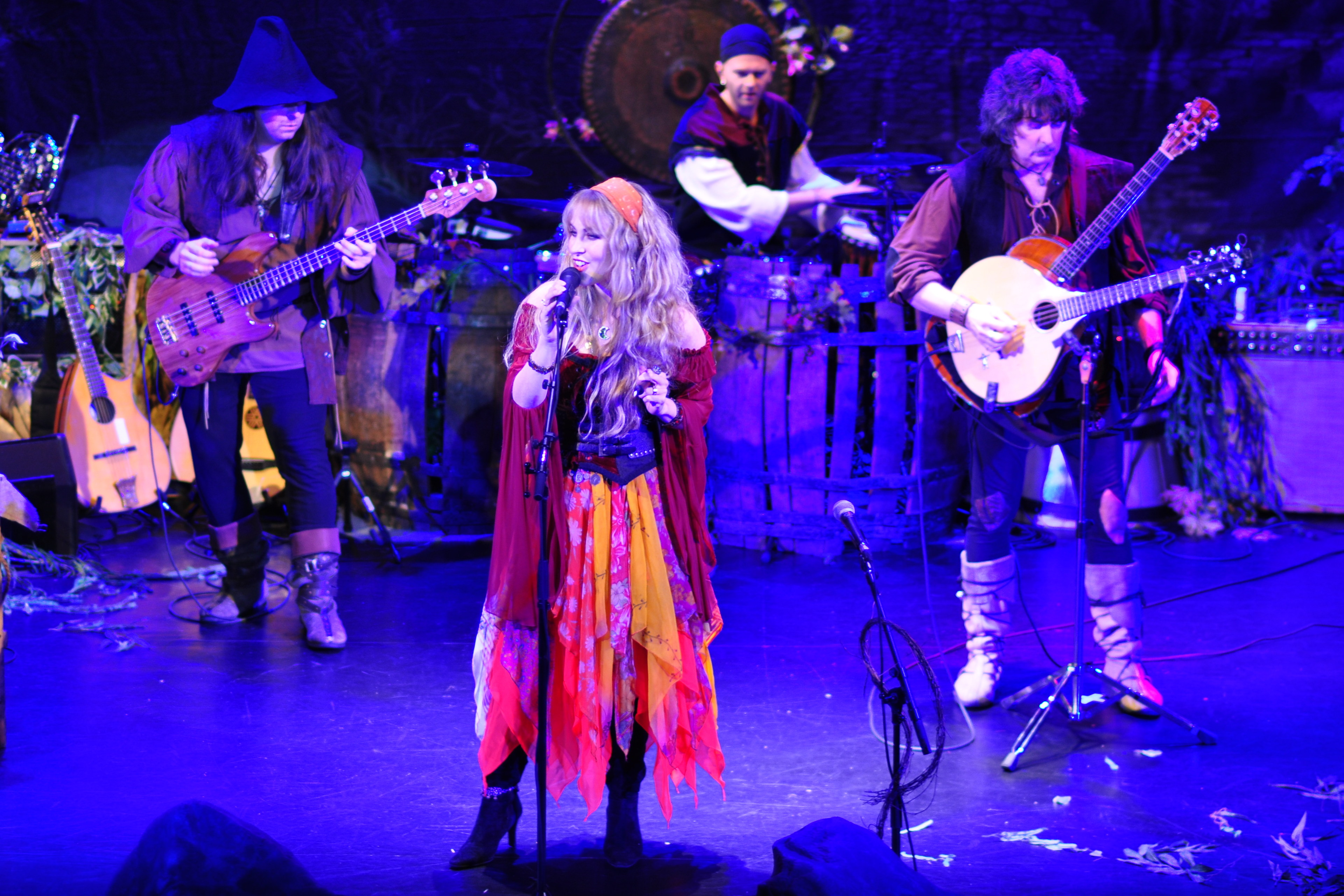
Blackmore's Night in 2012

In subsequent albums, particularly Fires at Midnight (2001), which featured the Bob Dylan song "The Times They Are a Changin'", there was occasionally an increased incorporation of electric guitar into the music, whilst maintaining a folk rock direction. A live album, Past Times with Good Company was released in 2002. After the next studio album's release, an official compilation album Beyond the Sunset: The Romantic Collection was released in 2004, featuring music from the four studio albums. A Christmas-themed holiday album, Winter Carols was released in 2006. Through numerous personnel changes, the duo has utilized over 26 backing musicians on their releases. Blackmore sometimes played drums in recording studio. They choose to avoid typical rock concert tours, instead limiting their appearances to small intimate venues. In 2011, Night said, "We have actually turned down a lot of (touring) opportunities."

A re-formed Rainbow begun performed European concerts from June 2016, lasted to 2019. The band featured metal singer Ronnie Romero, with Blackmore's Night band members such as keyboardist Jens Johansson and bassist Bob Nouveau.

Blackmore's Night has released eleven studio albums to date, with the latest one being Nature's Light in 2021.

On the 12 August 2026, Blackmore joined Deep Purple in performing "Smoke on the Water". The one-off reunion, which occurred following Blackmore's request, marked his first performance with the band since 1993.

== Equipment ==
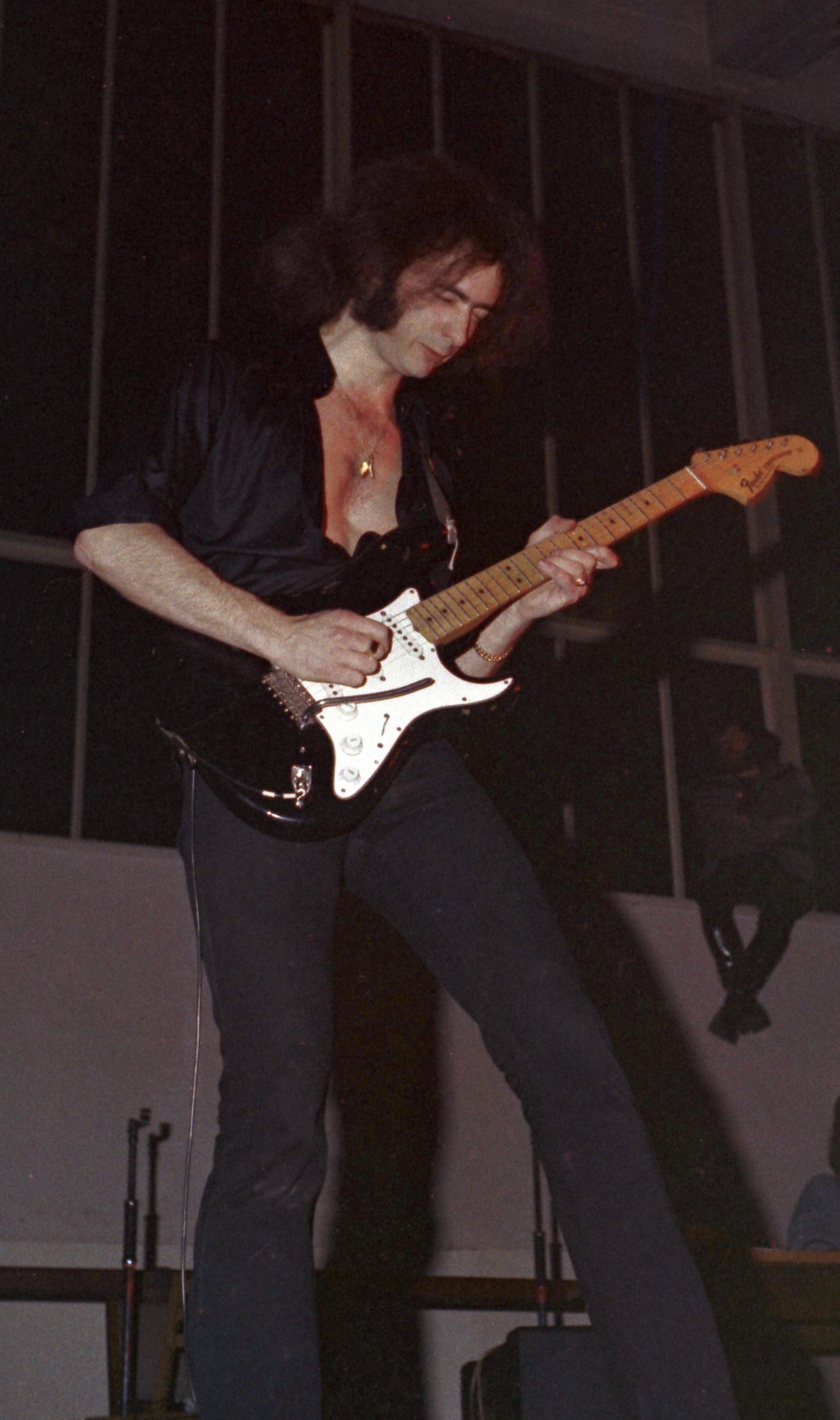
Blackmore in Hamburg, 1971

During the 1960s, Blackmore played a Gibson ES-335 but from 1970 he mainly played a Fender Stratocaster until he formed Blackmore's Night in 1997. The middle pick-up on his Stratocaster is screwed down and not used. Blackmore occasionally used a Fender Telecaster Thinline during recording sessions. He is also one of the first rock guitarists to use a "scalloped" fretboard, which creates a "U" shape between the frets.

In the 1970s, Blackmore used a number of different Stratocasters; one of his main guitars was an Olympic white 1974 model with a rosewood fingerboard that was scalloped. Blackmore added a strap lock to the headstock of this guitar as a conversation piece to annoy and confuse people, as it didn't actually do anything.

Effects he used from 1970 to 1997, besides his usual tape echo, included a Hornby Skewes treble booster in the early days. Around late-1973, he experimented with an EMS Synthi Hi Fli guitar synthesizer. He sometimes used a wah-wah pedal and a variable control treble-booster for sustain, and Moog Taurus bass pedals were used in solo parts during concerts. He also had a modified Aiwa TP-1011 tape machine built to supply echo and delay effects; the tape deck was also used as a pre-amp. Other effects that Blackmore used were a Uni-Vibe, a Dallas Arbiter Fuzz Face and an Octave Divider.

In the mid-1980s, he experimented with Roland guitar synthesizers. A Roland GR-700 was seen on stage as late as 1995–96, later replaced with the GR-50.

Blackmore has experimented with many different pick-ups in his Strats. In the early Rainbow era, they were still stock Fender equipment, but later became Dawk-installed over wound, dipped, Fender pick-ups. He has also used Schecter F-500-Ts, Velvet Hammer "Red Rhodes", DiMarzio "HS-2", OBL "Black Label", and Bill Lawrence L-450, XL-250 (bridge), L-250 (neck) pick-ups. In his signature Stratocaster, Seymour Duncan Quarter Pound Flat SSL-4's are used to emulate the Schecter F500ts. Since the early 1990s, he has used Lace Sensor (Gold) "noiseless" pick-ups.

== Influences and tastes ==
In the first issue of International Musician and Recording World, Blackmore named Jeff Beck his favourite guitar player. He also sang praises for Jimi Hendrix, Yes guitarist Steve Howe, Bob Dylan sideman Mike Bloomfield and Tommy Bolin, who would soon take his place on Deep Purple.

In 1979, Blackmore said: "I like popular music. I like ABBA very much. But there's so much stigma like, 'you can't do this because you're a heavy band', and I think that's rubbish. You should do what you want ... I think classical music is very good for the soul. A lot of people go 'ah well, classical music is for old fogies' but I was exactly the same. At 16 I didn't want to know about classical music: I'd had it rammed down my throat. But now I feel an obligation to tell the kids 'look, just give classical music a chance' ... the guitar frustrates me a lot because I'm not good enough to play it sometimes so I get mad and throw a moody. Sometimes I feel that what I'm doing is not right, in the sense that the whole rock and roll business has become a farce, like Billy Smart, Jr. Circus, and the only music that ever moves me is very disciplined classical music, which I can't play. But there's a reason I've made money. It's because I believe in what I'm doing, in that I do it my way—I play for myself first, then secondly the audience—I try to put as much as I can in it for them. Lastly I play for musicians and the band, and for critics not at all."

== Artistry ==
=== Blues origins ===
In his soloing, Blackmore combines blues scales and phrasing with dominant minor scales and ideas from European classical music. While playing he would often put the pick in his mouth, playing with his fingers.

=== Classical influence ===
Blackmore is noted for having played a pioneering role in bringing influences of classical music to rock 'n' roll. He is particularly fond of Baroque composer Johann Sebastian Bach. For instance, he revealed to Guitar World that he used a Bachian chord progression – Dm, Gm, C, A7, – behind the "Highway Star" guitar solo.

Ritchie Blackmore was also keen in using the cycle of 4ths chord progressions, by the way of triad arpeggios. This was standard practice in Baroque music, especially by Bach. A notable example is the second half of the "Burn" solo.

=== Rhythm guitar ===
One of Ritchie Blackmore hallmarks is the ability to writing memorable riffs using 4ths. His most iconic riff - the intro to Deep Purple's "Smoke On the Water" - is an example of such. Other Deep Purple songs that used the same idea were "Mandrake Root" and "Burn", along with Rainbow's "Man On A Silver Mountain", "All Night Long" and "Long Live Rock ‘n’ Roll". Riffs in 4ths became a mainstay in hard rock and heavy metal, post-Blackmore. Notable examples include Judas Priest's "Hell Bent for Leather", Ozzy Osbourne's "Suicide Solution", Mötley Crüe's "Shout at the Devil" and Iron Maiden's "Two Minutes to Midnight".

Blackmore frequently does sparse verse arrangements, using single-note riffs or playing octaves. Such accompaniments give room to keyboard players. "Smoke On the Water" is a prime example of this technique.

Blackmore is known for unapologetically borrowing musical ideas from other artist's music. "I get inspired by other people's songs and write something vaguely similar", said he on a 1978 Guitar Player interview. Here's a brief list:

- Although penned as a Deep Purple original, Ritchie Blackmore actually learnt "Mandrake Root"'s melody and chord progression through Carlos Little, his Screaming Lord Sutch & the Savages bandmate. It was written by previous Savages guitarist Bill Parkinson and originally called "Lost Soul".
- The "Black Night" intro riff is partially borrowed from the verse of Ricky Nelson's 1962 version of "Summertime", originally written by George and Ira Gershwin.
- In Rock opener "Speed King" was based on two Hendrix singles, "Stone Free" (1966) and "Fire" (1967).
- The "Lazy" track from Machine Head was inspired by Cream's "Steppin' Out".
- "Burn"'s main riff is similar to George Gershwin's 1924 song "Fascinating Rhythm".
- Another track from the Burn album – "Mistreated" – was admittedly modelled on Free's "Heartbreaker", from the band's 1973 album.

=== Lead guitar ===
Introduced by jazz musicians Les Paul, Barney Kessel and Tal Farlow in the 1950s, sweep picking was arguably first used in a rock context by Ritchie Blackmore. It can be heard in the tail end of "April", the final track from Deep Purple's homonymous album. Blackmore used the technique again on Rainbow's "Kill the King".

== Feud ==
Throughout his career, Blackmore has built a reputation for being difficult to work with. Beginning with Deep Purple, he sought to assume control of the band, which often led to conflict with the band members, especially vocalist Ian Gillan, who left the band twice, first in 1973 and again in 1989, due to creative differences. He clashed with his band members in Rainbow, making him the band's only constant member. Former member Glenn Hughes spoke about Blackmore in 2024, about him being "difficult but very intelligent, smart, but a difficult person to know and play with." Bob Daisley concurred but added that he got along well with Blackmore.

Blackmore is also known for two of his infamous stage antics. In 1974, he destroyed a camera on stage with his guitar and made his amplifier explode by lighting it on fire. In 1993, as recorded in the concert-documentary Come Hell or High Water, Blackmore threw a bottle of water against a cameraman for unknown reasons and did not play guitar during parts of several songs. A few days later, he quit Deep Purple.

“I have a bad reputation, but I don’t mind. My good friends, people who really know me, know what I am. [I have an image of] being very moody, being very sincere, telling people to fuck off when I shouldn’t have done. But I don’t care, not at all. I quite like it.”

— Ritchie Blackmore (1978)

== Personal life ==
In May 1964, Blackmore married Margit Volkmar (b. 1945) from Germany. They lived in Hamburg during the late 1960s. Their son, Jürgen "J.R." Blackmore, is a professional guitarist who has released several solo albums as well as playing in the touring Rainbow tribute band Over the Rainbow. Following their divorce, Blackmore married Bärbel, a former dancer from Germany, in September 1969 until their divorce in the early 1970s. As a result, he is a fluent German speaker.

For tax reasons, Blackmore moved to the US in 1974. Initially he lived in Oxnard, California, with opera singer Shoshana Feinstein for one year. She provided backing vocals on two songs in Rainbow's first album. During this period, he listened to early European classical music and light music a lot, for about three-quarters of his private time. Blackmore once said, "It's hard to relate that to rock. I listen very carefully to the patterns that Bach plays. I like direct, dramatic music." After having an affair with another woman, Christine, Blackmore met Amy Rothman in 1978, and moved to Connecticut. He married Rothman in 1981, but they divorced in 1983. Following the marriage's conclusion, he began a relationship with Tammi Williams. In early 1984 Blackmore met Williams in Chattanooga, Tennessee, where she was working as a hotel employee. In the same year, he purchased his first car, having learned to drive at age 39.

Blackmore and then-fashion model Candice Night began living together in 1991. They moved to her native Long Island in 1993. Having been engaged for nearly 15 years, the couple married in 2008. Night said, "he's making me younger and I'm aging him rapidly." Their daughter Autumn Esmeralda was born in 2010, and their son in 2012. Blackmore is a heavy drinker and watches German-language television via his satellite dish when he is at home. He has several German friends and a collection of about 2,000 CDs of Renaissance music.

In April 2025, Night revealed that Blackmore had suffered a heart attack about eighteen months previously that, along with other health issues, had left him struggling to even pick up a guitar.

Blackmore said in an interview that he is spiritual but not religious, adding that "religion usually involves money".

In a 2006 biography, Blackmore alleged that he was sexually assaulted by Freddie Starr at age 17 while recording in Joe Meek’s studio.

== Legacy ==
Readers of Guitar World voted two of Blackmore's guitar solos (both recorded with Deep Purple) among the 100 Greatest Guitar Solos of all time – "Highway Star" ranked 19th, and "Lazy" ranked 74th. His solo on "Child in Time" was ranked no. 16 in a 1998 Guitarist magazine readers poll of Top 100 Guitar Solos of All-Time. On 8 April 2016, he was inducted into the Rock and Roll Hall of Fame as one of original members of Deep Purple; he did not attend the ceremony.

On their Special Collection's Edition "The 100 Greatest Guitarists of All Time", Mojo magazine placed Ritchie Blackmore on #100, saying:

Ritchie Blackmore provided the bridge between Hendrix-inspired blues-rock and the virtuoso metal chopsmanship of Eddie Van Halen and Yngwie Malmsteen. Though his style echoed the American rockabilly and country giants he was weaned on, [...] Blackmore’s classical phrasing, harmony, string-skipping, and violin-like tone ushered in the age of precision histrionics. Furthermore, Blackmore’s economical rhythm guitar style, embodied in the classic double-stop main riff to Smoke On The Water, helped define a new breed of streamlined heavy rock. A master showman [...], Blackmore took Hendrix’s auto-destruction cue to new heights, hurling and bashing his stock Stratocasters to bits and tearing grille cloth off his Marshalls in awesome displays of bravado.

In 1993, musicologist Robert Walser defined Blackmore as "the most important musician of the emerging metal/classical fusion". He is credited as a precursor of the so-called "guitar shredders" that emerged in the mid-1980s.

Blackmore has been an influence on several 1980s guitarists such as Akira Takasaki, Fredrik Åkesson, Brett Garsed, Jeff Loomis, Janick Gers, Paul Gilbert, Craig Goldy, Scott Henderson, Dave Meniketti, Randy Rhoads, Michael Romeo, Wolf Hoffmann, Billy Corgan, Lita Ford, Brian May, Phil Collen and Yngwie Malmsteen. For his part Metallica drummer Lars Ulrich, who praised Blackmore on numerous occasions, highlighted that his "wild stage presence" led him to buy Deep Purple's Fireball, his first album ever. The drummer also claimed that the guitarist's riffs from his time with Rainbow had a significant impact on Metallica. Swedish guitarist Yngwie Malmsteen acknowledged having been influenced early on by Blackmore; during his childhood he learned to play Fireball in its entirety. He even dressed like him onstage. Malmsteen also hired three Rainbow vocalists for his band; Joe Lynn Turner, Graham Bonnet and Doogie White.

He was portrayed by Mathew Baynton in the 2009 film Telstar.

== Discography ==
=== Session recordings (1960–1968) ===
- 1963 The Outlaws – "The Return of the Outlaws" b/w "Texan Spiritual" (Single)
- 1963 The Outlaws – "That Set The Wild West Free b/w "Hobo"" (Single)
- 1963 The Outlaws – "Law And Order" b/w "Doo Dah Day" (Single)
- 1963 Michael Cox – "Don't You Break My Heart" b/w "Hark Is That A Cannon I Hear" (Single)
- 1963 Michael Cox – "Gee What A Party" b/w "Say That Again" (Single)
- 1963 Glenda Collins – "I Feel So Good" (the B-side of single)
- 1963 Glenda Collins – "If You Gotta Pick A Baby" b/w "In The First place" (Single)
- 1963 Heinz – "Dreams Do Come True" b/w "Been Invited to a Party" (Single)
- 1963 Heinz – "Just Like Eddie" b/w "Don't You Knock at My Door" (Single)
- 1963 Heinz – Tribute To Eddie ("Tribute To Eddie"; "Hush – A- Bye – Baby"; "Summertime Blues"; "Come on And Dance"; "20 Flight Rock"; "I Remember")
- 1963 Heinz – Heinz (EP: "I Get Up In The Morning"; "Talkin' Like A Man"; "That Lucky Old Sun"; "Lonely River")
- 1963 Heinz – "Country Boy" b/w "Long Tall Jack" (Single)
- 1963 Heinz – Live It Up (EP: "Live It Up"; "Don't You Understand"; "When Your Loving Goes Wrong")
- 1963 Houston Wells – "Only The Heartaches" (Single)
- 1963 Dave Adams – "Like A Bird Without Feathers" (the B-side of single)
- 1963 Dave Adams – "You Made Me Cry" (the B-side of single)
- 1963 Jenny Moss – "Hobbies" b/w "Big Boy" (Single)
- 1963 Geoff Goddard – "Sky Men" b/w "Walk With Me My Angel" (Single)
- 1963 Pamela Blue – "My Friend Bobby" b/w "Hey There Stranger" (Single)
- 1963 Gunilla Thorne – "Go on Then" (the B-side of single)
- 1963 Joe Meek Orchestra – "The Kennedy March" (Single)
- 1964 The Outlaws – "Keep A Knockin'" b/w "Shake With Me" (Single)
- 1964 The Outlaws – "The Bike Beat Part 1" b/w "The Bike Beat Part 2" (Single)
- 1964 Glenda Collins – "Baby It Hurts" b/w "Nice Wasn't It" (Single)
- 1964 Glenda Collins – "Lollipop" b/w "Evrybody's Got To Fall in Love" (Single)
- 1964 The Sharades – "Boy Trouble" (the B-side of single)
- 1964 Andy Cavell – "Tell The Truth" (Single)
- 1964 Davy Kaye – "A Fool Such As I" (Single)
- 1964 Houston Wells – "Galway Bay" b/w "Living Alone" (Single)
- 1964 Houston Wells & The Marksmen – Ramona (EP: "Ramona"; "Girl Down The Street"; "I Wonder Who's Kissing Her Now"; "Nobody's Child")
- 1964 Heinz – "You Were There" b/w "No Matter What They Say" (Single)
- 1964 Heinz – "Please Little Girl" b/w "For Lovin' Me This Way" (Single)
- 1964 Heinz – "Questions I Can't Answer" b/w "The Beating Of My Heart" (Single)
- 1964 Valerie Masters – "Christmas Calling" b/w "He Didn't Fool Me" (Single)
- 1965 The Outlaws – "Only For You" (the B-side of single)
- 1965 Michael Cox – Michael Cox in Sweden (EP: "I've Been Thinking"; "Is This Lonesome Old House")
- 1965 Glenda Collins – "Johnny Loves Me" b/w "Paradise For Two" (Single)
- 1965 Glenda Collins – "Thou Shalt Not Steal" b/w "Been Invited To A Party" (Single)
- 1965 Heinz – "Digging My Potatoes" b/w "She Ain't Coming Back" (Single)
- 1965 Heinz – "Don't Think Twice It's All Right" b/w "Big Fat Spider" (Single)
- 1965 Heinz – "End Of The World" b/w "You Make Me Feel So Good" (Single)
- 1965 Heinz – "Heart Full Of Sorrow" b/w "Don't Worry Baby" (Single)
- 1965 Screaming Lord Sutch – "The Train Kept A Rollin'" b/w "Honey Hush" (Single)
- 1965 Richie Blackmore Orchestra – "Getaway" b/w "Little Brown Jag" (Single)
- 1965 The Tornados – "Early Bird" b/w "Stomping Through The Rye" (Single)
- 1965 Jess Conrad – "It Can Happen To You" (the B-side of single)
- 1965 The Lancasters – "Satan's Holiday" b/w "Earthshaker" (Single)
- 1965 The Sessions – "Let Me In" b/w "Bouncing Bass" (Single)
- 1966 Heinz – "Movin' In" b/w "I'm Not A Bad Guy" (Single)
- 1966 Ronnie Jones – "My Only Souvenir" b/w "Satisfy My Soul" (Single)
- 1966 Soul Brothers – "Goodbye Babe, Goodbye" (Single)
- 1968 Neil Christian & The Crusaders – "My Baby Left Me" b/w "Yakkety Yak" (Single)
- 1968 Boz – "I Shall Be Released" b/w "Down in the Flood" (Single)
- 1968 Sundragon – "Five White Horses" (Single)
- 1968 Sundragon – Green Tambourine ("I Want To Be A Rock'n'roll Star", "Peacock Dress", "Love Minus Zero")
- 1968 Anan – "Madena" b/w "Standing Still" (Single)

=== Previously unreleased outtakes ===
- 1963 Chad Carson – "A Fool in Love"; "Jesse James"
- 1963 Dave Adams – "It Feels Funny, It Feels Good"; "You Just Can't Do It on Your Own"; "Clean, Clean, Clean"; "The Birds and the Bees"; "Don't Put All Your Eggs in One Basket"; "Oh What A Party"; "Let Me In"; "They're All Up To It"; "Signs And Posters"; "Out Behind The Barn"; "There's Something at the Bottom of the Garden"; "The Bathroom"
- 1963 Gene Vincent & The Outlaws – "Dance to the Bop"; "High Blood Pressure"; "Baby Blue", "Blue Jean Bop"; "Lotta Lovin'"; "Crazy Beat"; "Rip It Up"; "Frankie & Johnny"; "Another Saturday Night"; "I'm Gonna Catch Me A Rat"; "Long Tall Sally" (Those songs were recorded live)
- 1963 Jenny Moss – "Please Let It Happen To Me"; "My Boy Comes Marching Home"
- 1964 Kim Roberts – "Love Can't Wait"; "Mr. Right"
- 1964 Houston Wells – "We'll Remember You"
- 1965 The Outlaws – "As Long As I Live" (recorded live)
- 1965 Glenda Collins – "Sing C' Est La Vie"; "Run To Me"; "Self Portrait"

=== Compilations ===
- 1989 Ritchie Blackmore – Rock Profile Vol. 1
- 1991 Ritchie Blackmore – Rock Profile Vol. 2
- 1991 The Derek Lawrence Sessions Take 1
- 1992 The Derek Lawrence Sessions Take 3
- 1994 Heinz – Dreams Do Come True – The 45's Collection
- 1994 Ritchie Blackmore – Take It! Sessions 63/68
- 1995 It's Hard to Believe It: The Amazing World of Joe Meek
- 1998 Ritchie Blackmore – Anthology Vol.1
- 1998 Ritchie Blackmore – Anthology Vol.2
- 2002 Joe Meek – The Alchemist of Pop: Home Made Hits and Rarities 1959–66
- 2005 Ritchie Blackmore – Getaway – Groups & Sessions
- 2008 Houston Wells – Then & Now: From Joe Meek To New Zealand

=== Select guest appearances ===
- Green Bullfrog (1972) – a one-off session hosted by producer Derek Lawrence, recorded between February and May 1970, and featuring Big Jim Sullivan, Albert Lee and Ritchie Blackmore
- Screaming Lord Sutch & Heavy Friends – Hands of Jack the Ripper (1972) – recorded live in London in 1970, a one-off concert featuring musicians who had previously worked with Sutch
- Randy, Pie & Family – Hurry to the City"/"Looking with Eyes of Love (1973) – Blackmore featured on the A-side of the single
- Adam Faith – I Survive (1974) – Blackmore plays intro on the title track
- Jack Green – Humanesque (1980) – Blackmore plays on "I Call, No Answer"
- Rock Aid Armenia (1990) – Blackmore is featured as one of the guest soloists on the 1990 rendition of "Smoke on the Water", re-recorded to raise money to help those affected by the 1988 Armenian earthquake
- Laurent Voulzy – Caché Derrière (1992) – Blackmore plays solo on "Guitare héraut"
- Twang! A Tribute To Hank Marvin & The Shadows (1996) – Blackmore plays on "Apache"
- Sweet – All Right Now (1996) – recorded live in 1976, Blackmore plays on "All Right Now"
- Pat Boone – In a Metal Mood: No More Mr. Nice Guy (1997) – Blackmore plays on a cover of "Smoke On The Water" along with Dweezil Zappa
- Geyers Schwarzer Haufen – Live '99 (1999) – Blackmore plays on "Göttliche Devise", a bonus track off the album
- Geyers Schwarzer Haufen – Historock Lästerzungen (2004) – Blackmore plays on "God's Gospel"
- William Shatner – Seeking Major Tom (2011) – Blackmore and Candice Night guest on a cover of David Bowie's "Space Oddity"
- William Shatner – The Blues (2020) – Blackmore and Candice Night guest on a cover of B. B. King's "The Thrill Is Gone"
