= Joe Meek =

English record producer (1929–1967)

- Meek at his home recording studio, c. 1960s

Background information
- Also known as: Robert Duke, Peter Jacobs
- Born: Robert George Meek; 5 April 1929; Newent, Gloucestershire, England
- Died: 3 February 1967 (aged 37) Holloway Road, London, England
- Genres: Experimental pop; space age pop; rock and roll; outsider
- Occupations: Record producer; sound engineer; songwriter
- Years active: 1954–1967
- Labels: UK: Triumph (co-owner), Pye Nixa, Piccadilly, Decca, Ember, Oriole, Columbia, Top Rank, His Master's Voice, Parlophone; USA: Tower, London, Coral

Robert George "Joe" Meek (5 April 1929 – 3 February 1967) was an English record producer and songwriter considered one of the most influential sound engineers of all time, being one of the first to develop ideas such as the recording studio as an instrument, and becoming one of the first producers to be recognised for his individual identity as an artist. Meek pioneered space age and experimental pop music, and assisted in the development of recording practices like overdubbing, sampling and reverberation.

The Tornados' instrumental "Telstar" (1962), written and produced by Meek, became the first record by a British rock group to reach number one in the US Hot 100. It also spent five weeks at number one in the UK singles chart, with Meek receiving an Ivor Novello Award for this production as the "Best-Selling A-Side" of 1962. Charting singles Meek produced for other artists include "Johnny Remember Me" (John Leyton, 1961), "Just Like Eddie" (Heinz, 1963), "Angela Jones" (Michael Cox, 1960), "Have I the Right?" (the Honeycombs, 1964), and "Tribute to Buddy Holly" (Mike Berry, 1961). He also produced music for films such as Live It Up! (US title Sing and Swing, 1963), a pop music film. Meek's concept album I Hear a New World (1960), which contains innovative use of electronic sounds, was not fully released in his lifetime.

Meek was affected by bipolar disorder and schizophrenia. His commercial success as a producer was short-lived, and he gradually sank into debt and depression. On 3 February 1967, using a shotgun owned by musician Heinz Burt, Meek killed his landlady, Violet Shenton, with whom he had argued over the loudness of his studio, which he rented from her, and then shot himself.

At the time of his death, Meek possessed thousands of unreleased recordings later dubbed "The Tea Chest Tapes". His reputation for experiments in recording music was acknowledged by the Music Producers Guild who in 2009 created "The Joe Meek Award for Innovation in Production" as a "homage to [the] remarkable producer's pioneering spirit".

== Childhood and early interests ==
Meek was born at 1 Market Square, Newent, Gloucestershire, and developed an interest in electronics and performance art at a very early age, filling his parents' garden shed with begged and borrowed electronic components, building circuits, radios and what is believed to be the region's first working television. During his national service in the Royal Air Force, he worked as a radar technician which increased his interest in electronics and outer space. From 1953 he worked for the Midlands Electricity Board. He used the resources of the company to develop his interest in electronics and music production, including acquiring a disc cutter and producing his first record.

== Music career ==
He left the electricity board to work as an audio engineer for a leading independent radio production company which made programmes for Radio Luxembourg, and made his breakthrough with his work on Ivy Benson's Music for Lonely Lovers.

His technical ingenuity was first shown on the Humphrey Lyttelton jazz single "Bad Penny Blues" (Parlophone Records, 1956) when, contrary to Lyttelton's wishes, Meek modified the sound of the piano and compressed the sound to a greater than normal extent. The record became a hit.

=== Lansdowne Studios ===
He then put enormous effort into Denis Preston's Landsdowne Studio but tensions between Preston and Meek soon saw Meek leaving. During his time he recorded US actor George Chakiris for SAGA Records and it was this that led him to Major Wilfred Alonzo Banks and an independent career. He also engineered many jazz and calypso records including vocalist and percussionist Frank Holder and band leader Kenny Graham.

Meek was also working as a songwriter at this time, using the name "Robert Duke". After being initially released by Eddie Silver and later by Tommy Steele, the Duke composition "Put A Ring On My Finger" was recorded by Les Paul & Mary Ford in 1958, and reached number 32 on the US chart.

=== Triumph Records ===
In January 1960, together with William Barrington-Coupe, Meek founded Triumph Records. At the time Barrington-Coupe was working at SAGA records in Empire Yard, Holloway Road for Major Wilfred Alonzo Banks and it was the Major who provided the finance. The label very nearly had a No.1 hit with Meek's production of "Angela Jones" by Michael Cox. Cox was one of the featured singers on Jack Good's TV music show Boy Meets Girls and the song was given massive promotion. As an independent label, Triumph was dependent on small pressing plants, which were unable to meet the demand for product. The record made a respectable appearance in the Top Ten, but it demonstrated that Meek needed the distribution network of the major companies for his records to reach retail outlets.

Its indifferent business results and Meek's temperament eventually led to the label's demise. Meek later licensed many Triumph recordings to labels such as Top Rank and Pye. That year Meek conceived, wrote and produced an "Outer Space Music Fantasy" album titled I Hear a New World with a band called Rod Freeman & the Blue Men. The album was shelved for decades, apart from the release of some EP tracks taken from it.

=== 304 Holloway Road Studio ===
The Tornadoes – "Telstar" (1962)
"Telstar" featured a clavioline, a keyboard instrument with a distinctive electronic sound. The piece won an Ivor Novello Award and sold over five million copies worldwide.

Meek went on to set up his own production company known as RGM Sound Ltd (later Meeksville Sound Ltd) with toy importer Major Wilfred Alonzo Banks as his financial backer. He operated from his home studio which he constructed at 304 Holloway Road, Islington, a three-floor flat above a leather-goods store.

His first hit from Holloway Road reached number one in the UK Singles Chart: John Leyton's "Johnny Remember Me" (1961) written by Geoff Goddard. This "death ditty" was cleverly promoted by Leyton's manager, expatriate Australian entrepreneur Robert Stigwood. Stigwood was able to gain Leyton a booking to perform the song several times in an episode of Harpers West One, a short-lived ITV soap opera, in which he was making a guest appearance.

The instrumental "Telstar", written and produced by Meek, was recorded at the Holloway Road studio in July 1962. It was released in August 1962 and reached number one in the UK and on the US Billboard Hot 100 in December 1962.

Meek's third UK number one and last major success was with the Honeycombs' "Have I the Right?" in 1964, written by Ken Howard and Alan Blaikley. The Meek-produced track also became a number 5 hit on the American Billboard pop charts. The success of these recordings was instrumental in establishing Stigwood and Meek as two of Britain's first independent record producers.

When his landlady, Violet Shenton, who lived downstairs, felt that the noise was too much, she would bang on the ceiling with a broom. Meek would signal his contempt by placing loudspeakers in the stairwell and turning up the volume.

A privately manufactured "black plaque" (designed to resemble the official blue plaque) has since been placed at the location of the studio to commemorate Meek's life and work.

== Artistry ==
Meek was one of the first producers to grasp and fully exploit the possibilities of the modern recording studio. Up to that time, pop recordings sought to "capture a live performance" by recording all the performers "live in a studio", often situated around just a few microphones. Instead, Meek pioneered multiple over-dubbing on one- and two-track machines to combine separately recorded performances, segments, and even samples, into a painstakingly constructed composite recording, long before the Beatles made some of these techniques famous with Sgt. Pepper's Lonely Hearts Club Band (1967) or extended by Pink Floyd with The Dark Side of the Moon (1973).

By physically separating instruments, and using close miking, he could avoid "bleed", such as drum sounds appearing in vocal tracks, which freed him up to combine signals from different "takes", and allowed him to manipulate their individual signals.

He pioneered signal processing by using DI units on bass guitars, and treating instruments and voices with echo, reverb and compression, or his fabled home-made electronic devices. At a time when studio engineers limited themselves to maintaining clarity and fidelity, Meek was never afraid to distort or manipulate the sound if it created the effect he was seeking.

Unlike other producers, his search was for the 'right' sound rather than for a catchy musical tune, and throughout his brief career he single-mindedly followed his quest to create a unique "sonic signature" for every record he produced.

== Personal life ==
Meek became fascinated with the idea of communicating with the dead, after reading the works about EVP of Friedrich Jurgenson (1903–1987) and Konstantins Raudive (1909–1974). He would set up tape machines in graveyards in an attempt to record voices from beyond the grave, in one instance capturing the meows of a cat he believed was speaking in human tones, asking for help. In particular, he had an obsession with Buddy Holly (saying the late American rocker had communicated with him in dreams). By the end of his career, Meek's fascination with these topics had taken over his life following the deterioration in his mental health, and he started to believe that his flat contained poltergeists, that aliens were substituting his speech by controlling his mind, and that photographs in his studio were trying to communicate with him.

=== Mental health ===
Meek was affected by bipolar disorder and schizophrenia, and, upon receiving an apparently innocent phone call from American record producer Phil Spector, Meek immediately accused Spector of stealing his ideas before hanging up angrily. His professional efforts were often hindered by his paranoia (Meek was convinced that Decca Records would put hidden microphones behind his wallpaper to steal his ideas), depression, and extreme mood swings. In later years, Meek started experiencing psychotic delusions, culminating in his refusal to use the studio telephone for important communications due to his belief that his landlady was eavesdropping on his calls through the chimney, that he could control the minds of others with his recording equipment, and that he could monitor his acts while away from the studio through supernatural means.

Meek was also a frequent recreational drug user, with his barbiturate abuse further worsening his depressive episodes. In addition, his heavy consumption of amphetamines caused him to fly into volatile rages with little or no provocation, at one point leading him to hold a gun to the head of drummer Mitch Mitchell to 'inspire' a high-quality performance.

=== Sexual orientation ===
Meek's homosexuality – at a time when homosexual acts were illegal in the UK – put him under further pressure and he was particularly afraid that his mother would find out about his sexual orientation. In 1963 he was convicted and fined £15 (equivalent to £274 in 2025) for "importuning for immoral purposes" in a London public toilet, and was consequently subject to blackmail. In January 1967, police in Tattingstone, Suffolk, discovered two suitcases containing the remains of Bernard Oliver. According to some accounts, Meek was afraid of being questioned by the Metropolitan Police, as it was known they were intending to interview all of the gay men in London in relation to the murder. This was enough for him to lose his self-control.

=== Decline ===
Meek always walked everywhere outside the studio wearing sunglasses, fearing recognition by local gangsters such as the Kray twins, who he feared would attempt to steal his acts or blackmail him regarding his homosexuality.

Meek's depression deepened as his financial position became increasingly desperate. French composer Jean Ledrut accused him of plagiarism, claiming that the melody of "Telstar" had been copied from "La Marche d'Austerlitz", a piece from a score Ledrut had written for the film Austerlitz (1960). The lawsuit meant that Meek did not receive royalties from the record during his lifetime, and the issue was not resolved in his favour until three weeks after his death in 1967.

=== Murder and suicide ===
On 3 February 1967, Meek killed his landlady Violet Shenton, and then himself, at his Holloway Road residence. The weapon used was a single-barrelled shotgun which he had confiscated from his protégé, former Tornados bassist Heinz Burt. Meek and Shenton had argued over his noise levels and the rent that he still owed, before Meek picked up the gun. Burt had informed Meek that he had used the gun to shoot birds while on tour, at which point Meek had taken it. Meek had kept the gun under his bed, along with some cartridges. As the gun owner, Burt was questioned intensively by police before being eliminated from their enquiries. Meek was buried at Newent Cemetery, Newent, Gloucestershire.

== Legacy ==
=== Recording ===
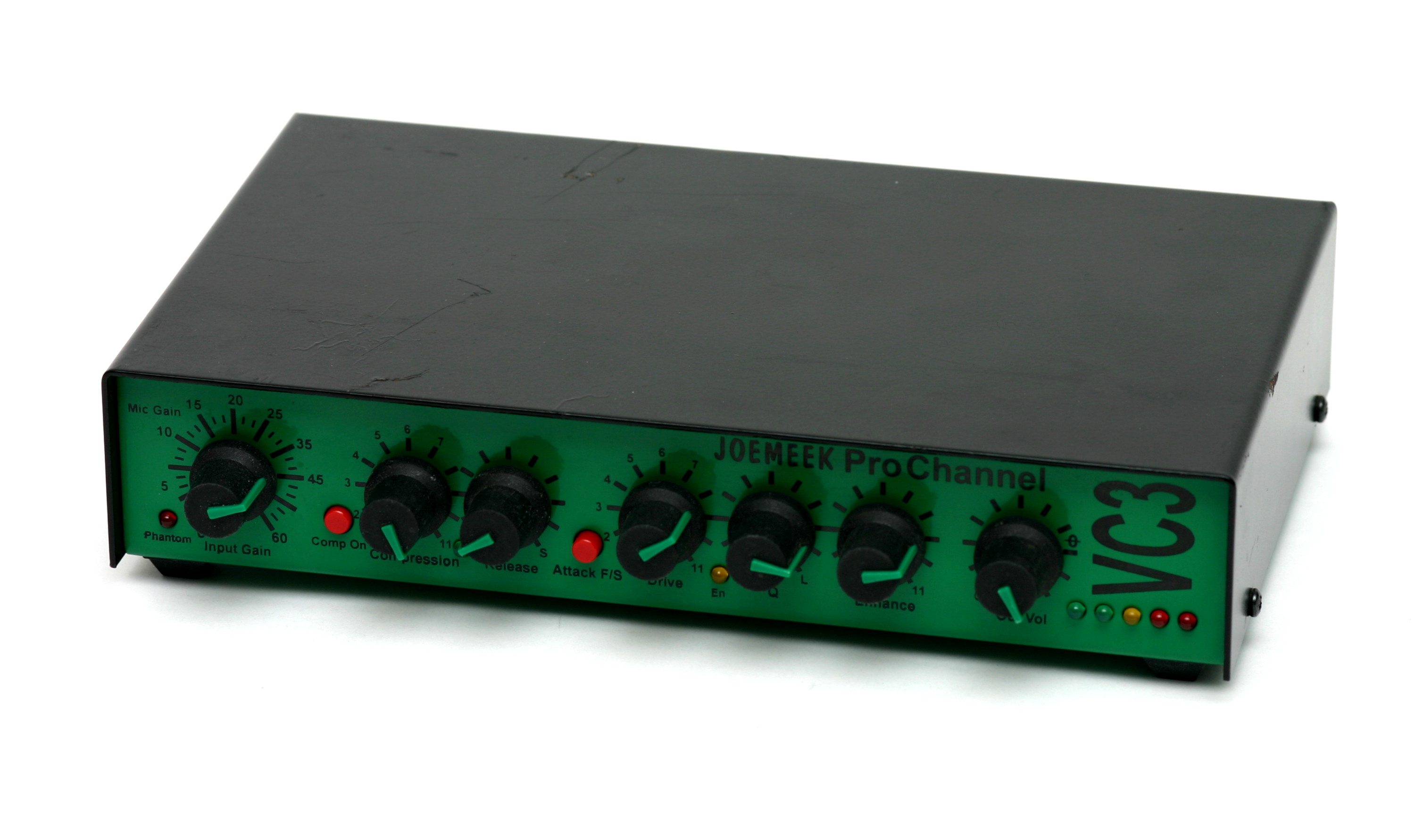
A Joemeek VC3 pre-amp / compressor / exciter

Meek's inability to play a musical instrument or write notation did not prevent him writing and producing successful commercial recordings. For songwriting, he was reliant on musicians such as Dave Adams, Geoff Goddard or Charles Blackwell to transcribe melodies from his vocal demos. He worked on 245 singles, 45 of which reached the top fifty.

In 1993, former session singer Ted Fletcher introduced the "Joemeek" line of audio processing equipment. The tribute to Meek was due to his influence in the early stages of audio compression. The name and product line were sold to the American company PMI Audio Group in 2003. The current product line includes a microphone series called "Telstar", named after Meek's biggest hit.

=== "The Tea Chest Tapes" ===
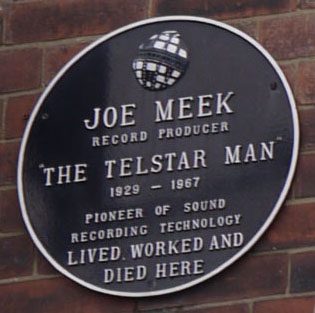
The Joe Meek black plaque at his studio at 304 Holloway Road

After Meek's suicide, Cliff Cooper of the Millionaires is said to have purchased the thousands of recordings Meek had hidden at his studio, for £300 (equivalent to £4,780 in 2025).. These recordings were called the "Tea Chest Tapes" among fans, as they had been stored in tea chests in Meek's flat. Alan Blackburn, former president of the Joe Meek Appreciation Society, catalogued all of them in the mid-1980s, but they remained unreleased.

On 4 September 2008, these unreleased recordings were auctioned in Fame Bureau's "It's More Than Rock 'N' Roll" auction. They were reportedly sold for £200,000 but, in a 2021 interview for the BBC, Cooper states that they had failed to sell on that occasion. They contained over 4,000 hours of music on approximately 1,850 tapes, including recordings by David Bowie as singer and sax player with the Konrads, Gene Vincent, Denny Laine, Billy Fury, Tom Jones, Jimmy Page, Mike Berry, John Leyton, Ritchie Blackmore, Jess Conrad, Mitch Mitchell and Screaming Lord Sutch. The tapes also contained many examples of Meek composing songs and experimental sound techniques. Tape 418 has Meek composing songs for the film Live It Up!

On 2 September 2020, Cherry Red Records announced that they had purchased the tapes from Cooper and would begin the process of digitising the archive with a view to releasing the material, subject to rights clearance. The first release was The Telstar Story in 2022, and the series has since run to a dozen volumes.

=== Artists produced by Meek ===
In 1963 Meek worked with a then little-known singer Tom Jones, then the lead vocalist of Tommy Scott & the Senators. Meek recorded seven tracks with Jones and took them to various labels in an attempt to get a record deal, with no success. Two years later after Jones' worldwide hit "It's Not Unusual" in 1965, Meek was able to sell the tapes he had recorded with Jones to Tower (US) and Columbia (UK).

- Dave Adams
- Deke Arlon and the Offbeats
- Chris Barber
- Shirley Bassey
- Cliff Bennett and the Rebel Rousers
- Mike Berry
- The Pete Best Four
- The Buzz
- Carter-Lewis and the Southerners
- George Chakiris
- Don Charles
- Neil Christian
- Petula Clark
- Glenda Collins
- Jess Conrad
- Michael Cox
- The Cryin' Shames
- Billie Davis
- Lonnie Donegan
- Diana Dors
- The Flee-Rekkers
- Emile Ford and the Checkmates
- Lance Fortune
- Billy Fury
- Geoff Goddard
- Iain Gregory
- Heinz and the Wild Boys
- Chas Hodges
- The Honeycombs
- Peter Jay and the Jaywalkers
- Tom Jones
- John Leyton
- Humphrey Lyttelton
- Valerie Masters
- The Moontrekkers
- Jenny Moss
- The Outlaws
- Mike Preston
- The Puppets
- Donn Reynolds
- The Riot Squad
- The Saints
- Wes Sands
- Mike Sarne
- Anne Shelton
- Sounds Incorporated
- Freddie Starr and the Midnighters
- Tommy Steele
- Big Jim Sullivan
- Screaming Lord Sutch and the Savages
- The Blue Rondos
- The Syndicats
- The Tornados
- Frankie Vaughan
- Gene Vincent
- Ricky Wayne and the Offbeats
- Houston Wells and the Marksmen

=== Charted singles ===
The following Meek productions appeared on the British charts.

| Artist | Title | No. | Date | Note(s) |
|---|---|---|---|---|
| Gary Miller | "The Garden of Eden" | 14 | January 1957 | |
| Gary Miller | "The Story of My Life" | 14 | January 1958 | |
| Emile Ford and the Checkmates | "What Do You Want to Make Those Eyes at Me For?" | 1 | October 1959 | |
| David MacBeth | "Mr. Blue" | 18 | October 1959 | |
| Lance Fortune | "Be Mine" | 4 | February 1960 | |
| Lance Fortune | "This Love I Have for You" | 26 | May 1960 | |
| John Leyton | "Johnny Remember Me" | 1 | August 1961 | |
| Mike Berry | "Tribute to Buddy Holly" | 24 | October 1961 | backed by the Outlaws |
| John Leyton | "Wild Wind" | 2 | October 1961 | backed by the Outlaws |
| John Leyton | "Son This Is She" | 15 | December 1961 | |
| Iain Gregory | "Can't You Hear the Beat of a Broken Heart" | 39 | January 1962 | |
| John Leyton | "Lonely City" | 14 | May 1962 | |
| The Tornados | "Telstar" | 1 | September 1962 | also writer |
| Mike Berry | "Don't You Think It's Time" | 6 | January 1963 | |
| The Tornados | "Globetrotter" | 5 | January 1963 | also writer |
| The Tornados | "Robot" | 17 | March 1963 | also writer |
| The Tornados | "The Ice Cream Man" | 18 | June 1963 | also writer |
| Heinz | "Just Like Eddie" | 5 | August 1963 | |
| Heinz | "Country Boy" | 26 | December 1963 | |
| Heinz | "You Were There" | 26 | March 1964 | |
| The Honeycombs | "Have I the Right?" | 1 | July 1964 | |
| Heinz | "Questions I Can't Answer" | 39 | October 1964 | |
| Heinz | "Diggin' My Potatoes" | 49 | March 1965 | |
| The Honeycombs | "That's the Way" | 12 | July 1965 | |
| The Cryin' Shames | "Please Stay" | 26 | April 1966 | |

== In popular culture ==
=== Biographies ===
In later years, the interest in Meek's life as well as influence on the music industry, has spawned at least two documentary films, a radio play, a stage play and a feature film.

- On 8 February 1991, the BBC showed a 60-minute documentary in its Arena documentary series, entitled The Very Strange Story of... the Legendary Joe Meek. The BBC has since repeated the documentary several times.
- On 26 March 1994, BBC Radio 4 broadcast Lonely Joe, a radio play based on the life of Meek, written by Janey Praeger and Peter Kavanagh.
- On 2 February 2005, Telstar, a stage play about Meek, written by actors Nick Moran and James Hicks, opened at the Cambridge Arts Theatre and then toured to York, Darlington, Guildford, Eastbourne and Manchester, before opening up at the New Ambassadors Theatre in London on 24 June 2005.
- On 12 April 2008, A Life in the Death of Joe Meek, by US filmmakers Howard S. Berger and Susan Stahman, was shown as a work-in-progress at the Sensoria Music & Film Festival in Sheffield.
- On 19 June 2009, a film adaption of Moran's and Hick's play, Telstar: The Joe Meek Story, premiered in London, directed by Nick Moran and with the star of the play, Con O'Neill, continuing his portrayal of Meek.

=== Tributes and references ===
In 2014, Meek was ranked the greatest producer of all time by NME, elaborating: "Meek was a complete trailblazer, attempting endless new ideas in his search for the perfect sound. ... The legacy of his endless experimentation is writ large over most of your favourite music today."

A number of artists have made tributes to Meek in various ways:

- Franco-English pop singer-songwriter MeeK chose his stage name as a homage to the British producer.
- British punk Wreckless Eric recounts Meek's life and recreates some of his studio effects in his song "Joe Meek" from the album Donovan of Trash.
- The Marked Men, a Texas punk band, have a song titled "Someday" with lyric: "Joe Meek wanted all the world to know about the news he found."
- The Frank Black song "White Noise Maker" deals with Meek's suicide by shotgun, the white noise maker of the title. "It's been so long since my Telstar."
- Matmos, an Electronic duo, have a song on their 2006 album The Rose Has Teeth in the Mouth of the Beast called "Solo Buttons for Joe Meek".
- In 1995, the record label Razor & Tie released the compilation album It's Hard to Believe It: The Amazing World of Joe Meek, consisting of twenty songs Meek had produced.
- Swing Out Sister include a short instrumental named "Joe Meek's Cat" on their 1997 album Shapes and Patterns, inspired by Meek's 1966 ghost-hunting expeditions to Warley Lea Farm during which he allegedly captured recordings of a talking cat channelling the spirit of a former landowner who committed suicide at the farm.
- Graham Parker's 1992 album Burning Questions includes the cryptic "Just Like Joe Meek's Blues"
- Sheryl Crow claimed that her song "A Change Would Do You Good" was inspired by an article she read about Meek.
- Jonathan King recorded a song in 2007 about Meek Titled "He Stood in the Bath He Stamped on the Floor".
- Johnny Stage, Danish producer and guitarist released an album in tribute of Meek, entitled The Lady with the Crying Eyes featuring various Danish artists, on 3 February 2007.
- Dave Stewart (the keyboardist) and Barbara Gaskin recorded the song "Your Lucky Star" dealing with the life and death of Meek, released on the 1991 album "Spin". Dave Stewart also recorded a version of "Telstar" on the occasion of its 40th anniversary in 2002. This was later released on the Dave Stewart and Barbara Gaskin 2009 mini-album "Hour Moon". The album also features the duo's previously released Meek tribute "Your Lucky Star" from their 1991 album "Spin".
- The Spanish label Spicnic released in 2001 a tribute CD, "Oigo un nuevo no mundo. Homenaje a Joe Meek", featuring various Spanish bands.
- Trey Spruance, from the band Mr. Bungle, has stated that the ten-part song/instrumental "The Bends" from their album Disco Volante is inspired by Joe Meek's music. Specifically "I Hear a New World".
- The Coral's British Top 10 hit "Don't Think You're the First" (2003) is a musical homage to Meek.
- Thomas Truax regularly performed his Meek tribute "Joe Meek Warns Buddy Holly" on his 2008 tours, a song apparently about Meek's supposed warning via spirit-writing predicting Buddy Holly's death. A single and accompanying video was scheduled for release on 3 February 2009, the 50th anniversary of Holly's demise, also the date of Meek's suicide.
- Robb Shenton released "Lonely Joe" as a tribute to the producer on 28 October 2008. Shenton was one of Meek's artists and was with five Meek bands between 1963 and early 1966: The Bobcats, David John and the Mood, the Prestons, the Nashpool and Flip and the Dateliners. He also sang backing vocals with many others.
- In 2004 and 2006 respectively, UK record label Western Star records put together and released two volumes of Meek tributes on CD. These compilations were made up of Western Star artists all paying tribute by recording songs originally recorded or written by Meek. Then in 2012, producer, label boss and long time Meek enthusiast Alan Wilson released "Holloway Road", a song about Meek. This featured on the album Infamy, by his own band The Sharks.
- In 2005, Cane 141 released a B-Side called "Joe Meek Shall Inherit The Earth". The name is a pun on Joe Meek's name and the Bible verse Matthew 5:5 where Jesus (during the Sermon on the Mount) is quoted as saying "Blessed are the meek: for they shall inherit the earth."
- Deadbeat Poets recorded "Staircase Stomp" in 2010; the title is a reference to the Honeycombs song "Have I the Right?", and the song has many references to Meek.
- Jasper Marsalis, of the music performance piece Slauson Malone 1, performed a cover of Meek's "I Hear a New World" on his 2023 album EXCELSIOR and at live performances preceding its release. Marsalis credits the original song with inspiring him to continue his music career during the making of EXCELSIOR, stating the following during a Bandcamp online listening party: "Originally this album was only supposed to be two songs and after that I was going to stop making music then my friend Rahill played me the song ‘I Hear A New World’ by Joe Meek. I just felt so inspired by listening to it. I wanted to do a cover to learn how the song was made and it inspired me to develop an entire album around this one song."
- Meek appears as a character in the second of Alan Moore's Long London book series, I Hear A New World.

== Bibliography ==
- Brend, Mark (2005). Strange Sounds: Offbeat Instruments and Sonic Experiments in Pop. Backbeat. ISBN 978-0-87930-855-1.
