= I Hear a New World =

1960 studio album by Joe Meek

EP by Joe Meek
- Released: 1960
- Recorded: 1959
- Studio: Lansdowne Studios
- Genres: Experimental pop; avant-pop; electronic; space-age pop
- Length: 12:01
- Label: Triumph TRX-ST9000
- Producer: Joe Meek

I Hear a New World

Studio album by Joe Meek and the Blue Men
- Released: 1991
- Length: 32:56
- Label: RPM Records
- Producer: Joe Meek

Professional ratings
Review scores
Source	Rating
Allmusic	4.5/5 stars
Pitchfork	8.3/10

I Hear a New World is a studio concept album written and produced by Joe Meek with the Blue Men, partially released as an EP in 1960 before financial issues at the Triumph label prevented further release of the material. In 1991, the full LP was issued by RPM Records. In 1998, The Wire listed the album as one of "100 Records that Set the World on Fire (When No One Was Listening)".

== Production ==
The Blue Men were originally the West Five, a skiffle group from Ealing in London. In addition to I Hear a New World, they also recorded under the name of Rodd, Ken and the Cavaliers for Meek. The tracks were recorded at his Holland Park flat and at Lansdowne Studios.

== Music ==
Vlad Nichols of Ultimate Guitar said the album was "the notable exception from general space pop in that it made extensive use of free-form song structure and lingering, weirdly distorted melodies to invoke that feeling of floating in space while struck with amazement which made it much closer to the pensive and experimental nature of space rock as we know it."

The album was Meek's pet project. He was fascinated by the space programme, and believed that life existed elsewhere in the Solar System. This album was his attempt "to create a picture in music of what could be up there in outer space", he explained. "At first I was going to record it with music that was completely out of this world but realized that it would have very little entertainment value so I kept the construction of the music down to earth". He achieved this as a sound engineer by blending the Blue Men's skiffle/rock-and-roll style with a range of sound effects created by such kitchen-sink methods as blowing bubbles in water with a straw, draining water out of a sink, shorting out an electrical circuit and banging partly filled milk bottles with spoons; however, one must listen carefully to detect these prosaic origins in the finished product. Another feature of the recordings is the early use of stereophonic sound.

The first, eponymous track on the album is the only one to feature conventional vocals. Most of the others are instrumentals; however, some feature high-frequency vocals in the style of Alvin and the Chipmunks, Pinky and Perky and the Nutty Squirrels. Meek also wrote liner notes for each track to set the scene for each piece; for instance, the notes for "Magnetic Field" read, "This is a stretch of the Moon where there is a strange lack of gravity forcing everything to float three feet above the crust, which with a different magnetic field from the surface sets any article in some sections in vigorous motion, and at times everything is in rhythm".

== Release history ==
The LP was scheduled to be released by Joe Meek's Triumph Records label in May 1960, but only a 4-track 7-inch EP (part 1) was released with only 99 copies circulating. Only a few demo/preview copies of the LP are known to exist. The re-releases are dubbed from these discs.

A second EP was planned, but never appeared; only the sleeve was printed. This (and the cancellation of the album) was due to financial problems at the label, which resulted in Meek's leaving Triumph. The band, too, drifted away and returned to the live circuit.

Four compositions from I Hear a New World were also used on the 1961 album Dream of the West by The Outlaws. The songs were retitled to fit to the theme of the album: "Orbit Around the Moon" became "Husky Team"; "Entry of the Globbots" became "Tune for Short Cowboys"; "The Bublight" became "The Outlaws" and "Valley of the Saroos" became "Spring is Near".

== Legacy ==
It was described as having a "profound influence on artists as diverse as Steven Stapleton and Saint Etienne". The title song was covered by the Television Personalities, Mark Sultan and They Might Be Giants in 2004.

== Personnel ==
The Blue Men

- Rod Freeman (group leader) – guitar, vocals
- Ken Harvey – tenor sax, vocals
- Roger Fiola – Hawaiian guitar
- Chris White – guitar
- Doug Collins – bass
- Dave Golding – drums

== Track listing ==
=== 1960 original ===
Side A

1. Entry of the Globbots
2. Valley of the Saroos

Side B

1. Magnetic Field
2. Around the Moon

=== 1991 reissue ===
Side 1

1. "I Hear a New World" 2:44
2. "Globb Waterfall" 3:15
3. "Entry of the Globbots" 3:09
4. "Valley of the Saroos" 2:50
5. "Magnetic Field" 3:10
6. "Orbit Around The Moon" 2:49

Side 2

1. "The Bublight" 2:43
2. "March of the Dribcots" 2:07
3. "Love Dance of the Saroos" 2:33
4. "The Dribcots' Space Boat" 2:16
5. "Disc Dance of the Globbots" 2:15
6. "Valley of No Return" 3:07

== Releases ==
- The Blue Men, directed by Rod Freeman: I Hear A New World – Part 1 (EP, Triumph Records RGX-ST5000, March 1960)

"Entry of the Globbots", "Valley of the Saroos", "Orbit Around the Moon", "Magnetic Field"

- The Blue Men, directed by Rod Freeman: I Hear A New World – Part 2 (EP, Triumph Records RGX-ST5001, unreleased)

"Globb Waterfall", "The Dribcots' Space Boat", "Love Dance Of the Saroos", "The Bublight"

- LP, Triumph Records TRX-ST9000 scheduled for May 1960)
- CD (RPM Records RPM502) Joe Meek – "I Hear a New World" (the front cover credits Meek, and the back credits Rod Freeman and the Blue Men; also includes audio and film clips of interviews with Meek)

== Bibliography ==
- Brend, Mark (2005). Strange Sounds: Offbeat Instruments and Sonic Experiments in Pop. Backbeat. ISBN 978-0-87930-855-1.
