= Glenda Collins =

English singer (born 1943)

- Born: 16 December 1943 (age 82); Stoke Newington, London, England
- Genre: Pop music
- Occupation: Singer
- Instrument: Vocals
- Years active: 1960s
- Labels: Decca, His Master's Voice, Pye

Glenda Collins (born 16 December 1943) in Stoke Newington, London, England, is an English pop music singer, primarily active in the 1960s. She recorded a string of singles which were produced by Joe Meek, and was the only female singer he regularly worked with.

== Career ==
Collins was discovered by Carroll Levis, whose promotion landed her a contract with Decca Records. She released three singles through Decca, which failed to chart, and she was dropped by the label.

Her manager father then recorded some demos with Collins, and introduced her to independent record producer Joe Meek, who took her on. Meek featured house bands The Tornados and The Outlaws, including guitarist Ritchie Blackmore on some tracks.

She released a total of eight singles with Meek, issued through the His Master's Voice and Pye labels, none of which appeared in the UK Singles Chart. After Meek's suicide in 1967, she recorded sporadically, but his death effectively ended her recording career, and she retired at the end of the 1960s after a few years on the cabaret circuit.

Collins briefly came out of retirement in 1999 to record a cover version of "Avenues and Alleyways" (the theme from The Protectors) with record producer Russell C. Brennan (aka Russell C. Writer), which featured on the compilation album, Cult Themes from the 70's, Vol. 2, issued by Future Legend Records. Her agents were keen to organise a concert tour, which did not materialise.

A 2006 compilation titled This Little Girl's Gone Rockin' compiled what was then thought to be her complete surviving recorded output.

In 2019, Collins made a second comeback, and teamed up again with Brennan once more - as she liked working with him, and considered him Meek's successor - to do a new cover of another theme for the last album in the Future Legend cult themes series, Cult Themes Forever. This time, she recorded "Nobody's Fool" (the theme from Budgie) written by Ray Davies.

In 2020, Collins made a special recording with Brennan again. He had written a female slant on the song, "The Long Drop", originally meant for Tony Kaye (aka Tony Grinham). It was released to coincide with the anniversary of Meek's death on 3 February 2020. The response to the releases were so positive that Future Legend signed her to a permanent deal, and Brennan began producing an album with Collins for a 2022 release. The first single from the album, "Too Sad To Cry", was released in March 2022. Prior to this, Future Legend re-issued her Decca singles, with one of the tracks, "Find Another Fool", having been remixed by Brennan.

Collins' first ever solo album of new tracks, Second Chance, came out on Future Legend Records in December 2022.

== Discography ==
=== Singles ===
- "Crazy Guy" / "Take a Chance" (Decca F11280, 1960)
- "Oh How I Miss You Tonight" / "Age for Love" (Decca F11321, 1961)
- "Head over Heels in Love" / "Find Another Fool" (Decca F11417, 1961)
- "I Lost My Heart at the Fairground" / "I Feel So Good" (His Master's Voice POP1163, 1963)
- "If You've Got to Pick a Baby" / "In the First Place" (His Master's Voice POP1233, 1963)
- "Baby It Hurts" / "Nice Wasn't It" (His Master's Voice POP1283, 1964)
- "Lollipop" / "Everybody's Got to Fall in Love" (His Master's Voice POP1323, 1964)
- "Johnny Loves Me" / "Paradise for Two" (His Master's Voice POP1439, 1965)
- "Thou Shalt Not Steal" / "Been Invited to a Party" (His Master's Voice POP1475, 1965)
- "Something I've Got to Tell You" / "My Heart Didn't Lie" (Pye 7N17044, 1966)
- "It's Hard to Believe It" / "Don't Let It Rain on Sunday" (Pye 7N17150, 1966)
- "The Long Drop" / "Numbers" FLRSGC01 (Future Legend Records, 2020)
- "Find Another Fool" (remix) FLRGC02 (Future Legend Records, 2020)
- "Too Sad Too Cry" FLRCG04D (Future Legend Records, 2022)
- "Crying Out For Love" FLRGC.5D (Future Legend Records, 2023)

=== Appearances ===
- Cult Themes from the 70's, Vol. 2 (one track only: "Avenues and Alleyways" (The Protectors theme) (Future Legend Records. FLEG.12CD 1999)
- Cult Themes Forever ("Nobody's Fool" (theme from Budgie) (Future Legend Records) FLEG.37CD (2019)

=== Compilations ===
- Been Invited to a Party: The Singles 1963-1966 (Connoisseur 108, 1990)
- This Little Girl's Gone Rockin' (RPM Records UK ASIN B000024URR, 2006)
- In The Beginning (7 track EP) Early Decca singles, plus remix of "Find Another Fool" (Future Legend Records) (2020)
- Baby It Hurts: The Holloway Road Sessions 1963-1966 (Cherry Red TCTBX6, 2023)
- Joe Meek's Tea Chest Tapes: It's A Riot! (With The Riot Squad) (Cherry Red TCT107, 2023)

=== Albums ===
- Second Chance, Future Legend Records FLR.41CD, December 2022
