= Dave Adams (musician) =

British musician (1938–2016)

- Also known as: Burr Bailey; Silas Dooley Jr.
- Born: David Malcolm Adams; 27 November 1938; Saint Helier, Jersey
- Died: 19 March 2016 (aged 77) Buffalo, New York, U.S.
- Genres: Pop music
- Occupations: Musician, session musician, songwriter
- Instrument: Keyboards
- Years active: 1958–2016
- Labels: EMI, Decca, Parlophone, Triumph
- Formerly of: The Wild Boys

David Malcolm Adams (27 November 1938 – 19 March 2016) was a British singer, keyboard player and songwriter.

Born in Jersey, Adams began working with Joe Meek in 1958 and continued to work with him until Meek's death in 1967. In the early 1960s, he helped build up Meek's studio. Adams recorded singles with Meek under various pseudonyms and wrote songs for him. Adams was part of the production of the hit single "Telstar" by The Tornados; a "second stage demo" of him playing the tune exists. He was also a member of Heinz Burt's backing band, The Wild Boys, along with Ritchie Blackmore. In his autobiography Adams also revealed that he had a love affair with Joe Meek.

Adams later lived in Buffalo, New York. His daughter, Dee Adams writes and performs music as a solo artist, with a country-rock band, Dee and the Housecats, and with a jazz band, The Funny Valentines.

== Discography ==
- Sep 1958: Joy and David: "Whoopee!" (Adams) / "My Oh My" (Duke) – Parlophone R 4477
- Feb 1959: Joy and David: "Rockin' Away The Blues" (Duke/Adams) / "If You Pass Me By" (Duke) – Decca F 11123 (also issued on 78)
- Mar 1960: Joy & Dave: "Let's Go See Gran'ma" (Adams) / "Believe Me" (Duke) – Triumph RGM 1002
- Oct 1960: Joy & Dave: "My Very Good Friend the Milkman" (Spina/Burke) / "Doopey Darling" (Duke) – Decca F 11291
- Dec 1961: Joy & Dave: "Joe's Been A-Gittin' There" (Wilkin/Martin) / "They Tell Us Not To Love" (Duke) – Parlophone R 4855 (demo copies contain an alternative, slower recording of the B-side).
- Jun 1963: Burr Bailey and The Six-Shooters: "San Francisco Bay" (Fuller) / Burr Bailey and The Fletchers: "Like A Bird Without Feathers" (Meek/Lawrence) – Decca F 11686
- Feb 1964: Burr Bailey: "Chahawki" (Meek/Raymonde) / "You Made Me Cry" (Joe Meek) – Decca F 11846
- The Silas Dooley Jr. L.P. (1998) (on The Dave Adams Story CD) (recorded in 1963 but remained unreleased until 1994/1998. The original working title for the LP was believed to be Naughty But Nice!).
