= Ian Gregory =

British stuntman (1942–2021)

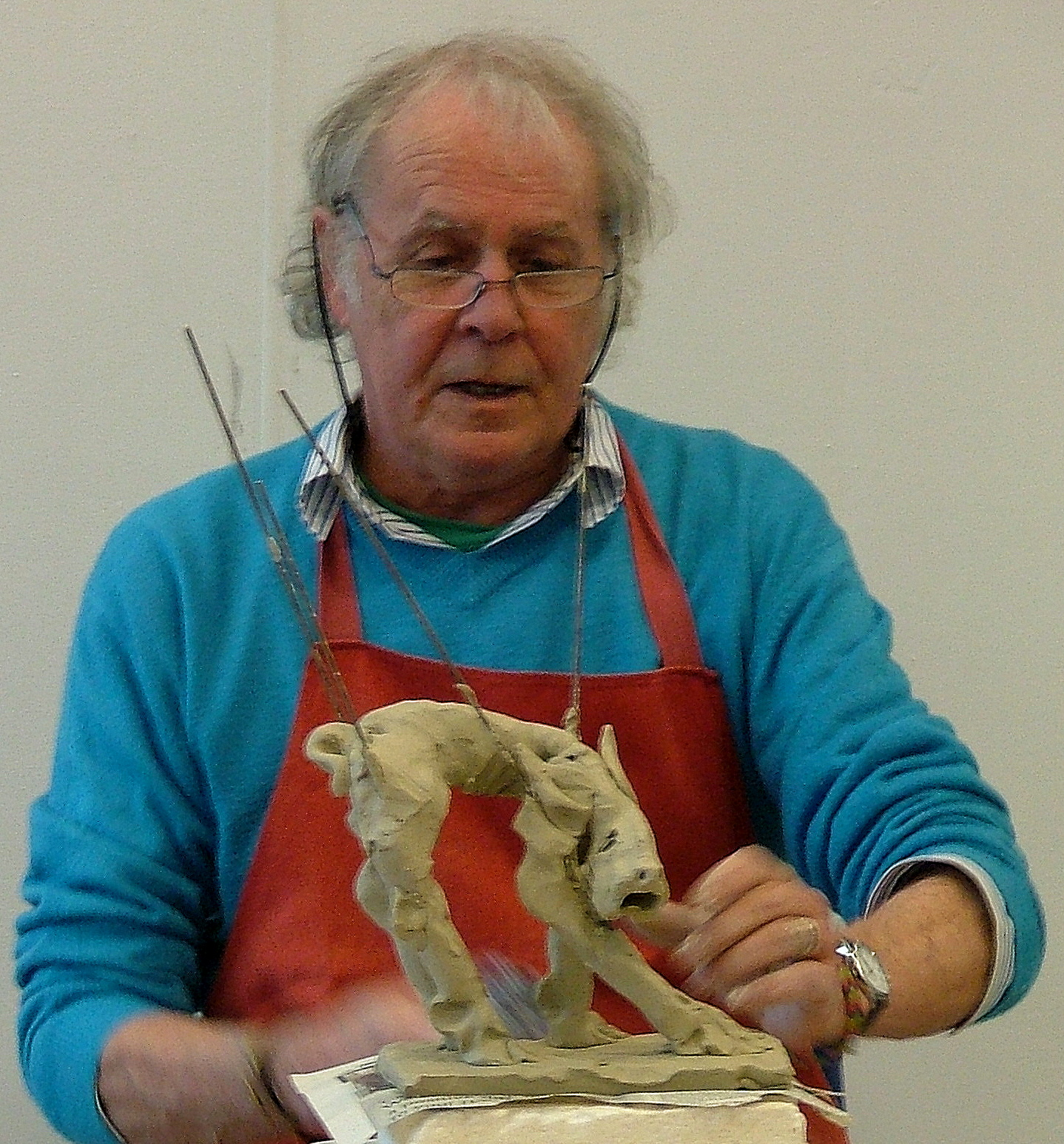
Ian Gregory modeling a dog in 2008

Ian Gregory (or Iain Gregory; 1942, Eastcote, Middlesex – 8 April 2021) was a British stuntman, singer and potter.

As a singer he performed with Joe Meek on a song called "Time Will Tell", and also the song "Can't You Hear the Beat of a Broken Heart" written by Meek.

In 1964, he appeared as an actor in the British drama film, The System.

Gregory attended St Martin's School of Art. His early pottery work consisted of salt-glazed stoneware chest of drawers, one of which is included in the Victoria and Albert Museum collection. He was an early user of paper clay and an innovative kiln builder.

In 1977, Gregory was elected a fellow of the Craft Potters Association. He was head of the art department at Milton Abbey School, he also taught at the University of the West of England. His work can be found in The Fitzwilliam Museum, the Aberystwyth University Ceramics Collection and Nottingham Castle Museum.
