= The Sunshine of Your Smile =

Song

Single by Olga, Elga and Eli Hudson
- Published: 1913
- Released: 1914
- Genre: Traditional pop
- Composer: Lilian Ray
- Lyricist: Leonard Cooke

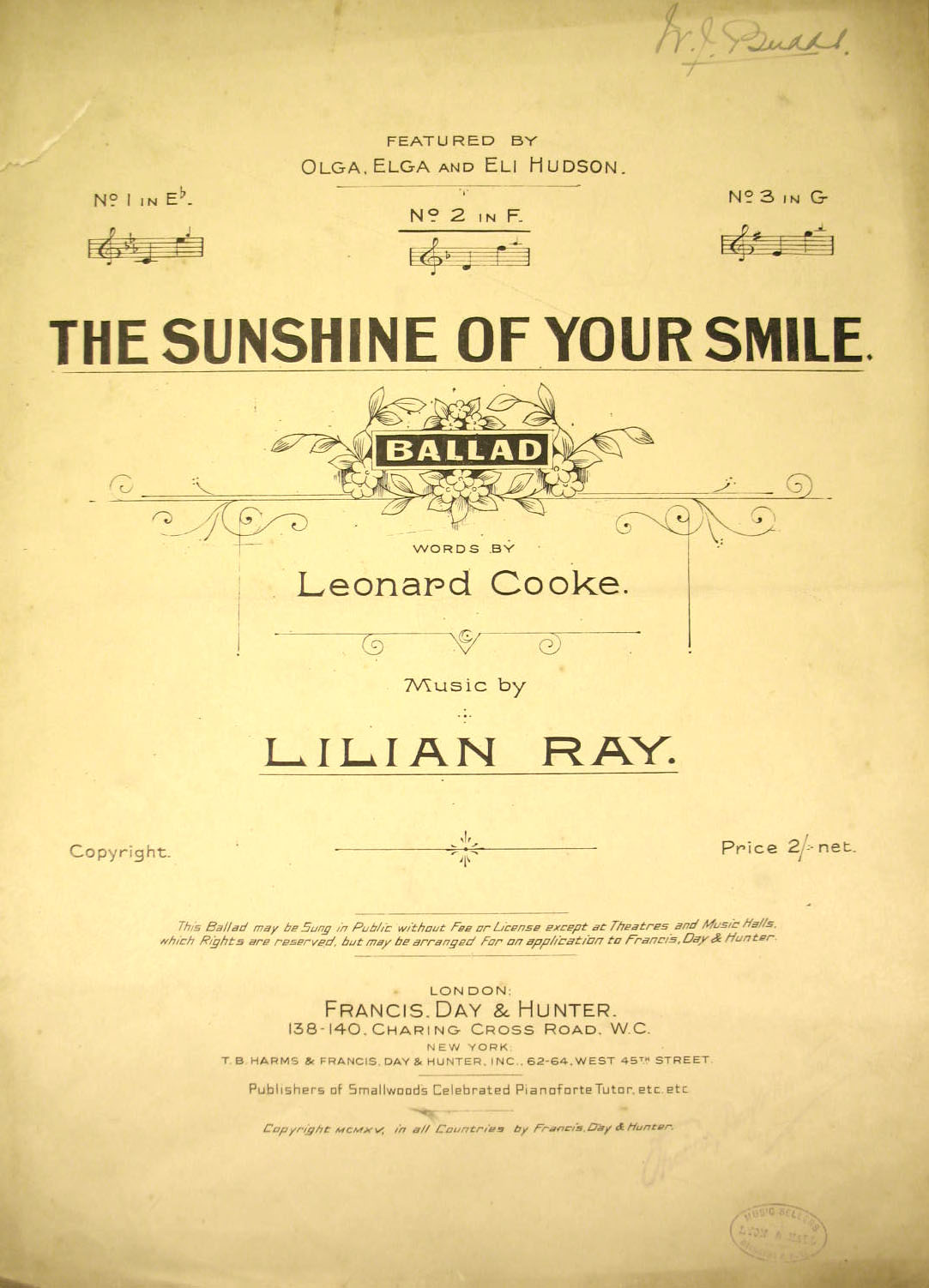
Original sheet music from 1913

"The Sunshine of Your Smile" is a British popular song published in London in 1913 just before the First World War by Francis, Day and Hunter. The lyrics were by Leonard Cooke and the music by Lilian Ray. It became a top ten hit on the UK Singles Chart in 1980, sung by Mike Berry.

== Lyrics ==
The following lyrics are taken from the sheet music published in 1913:

Verse 1:

Dear face that holds so sweet a smile for me,
Were you not mine, how dark the world would be!
I know no light above that could replace
Love's radiant sunshine in your dear, dear face.

Refrain:

Give me your smile, the love-light in your eyes,
Life could not hold a fairer Paradise!
Give me the right to love you all the while,
My world for ever, the sunshine of your smile!

Verse 2:

Shadows may fall upon the land and sea,
Sunshine from all the world may hidden be;
But I shall see no cloud across the sun;
Your smile shall light my life, till life is done!

Refrain:

Give me your smile, the love-light in your eyes,
Life could not hold a fairer Paradise!
Give me the right to love you all the while,
My world for ever, the sunshine of your smile!

== Recordings ==
Below is a list of artists who have recorded the song and the recording date and record information (where known):

- Olga, Elga and Eli Hudson, 1914
- Fred Douglas, 1914
- Ernest Pike, 1914
- Jessie Broughton, c. 1915
- William Thomas, c. 1915, Regal G6745
- Gertie Dickeson, 1915
- Lambert Murphy, 1916, Victor 55069
- John McCormack, 1916, Victor 64622
- Norah Johnson, 1916
- Riccardo Stracciari, 1919, Columbia 49590
- Tamaki Miura, 1922, Nipponophone 15065
- Charles Hackett, 1927, Columbia 4042
- Tito Schipa, 1930, Victor 1451 (Sung in Spanish)
- Jussi Björling, 1931, Swedish HMV X3724 (Sung in Swedish)
- Django Reinhardt & Le Quintette du Hot Club De France, April 1935
- Lilian Davies, 1930
- Frank Sinatra, 1941, Victor 27638
- Vera Lynn, from the film Rhythm Serenade, 1943
- James Melton, 1950
- Mike Berry, 1980
