= Space age pop =

Music genre

- Other names: Space pop; bachelor pad music; lounge music
- Stylistic origins: Space Age culture; pop; easy listening; Impressionism; big band; vocal jazz; samba; mambo; calypso; Hawaiian music; electronic
- Cultural origins: 1950s, United States and Mexico
- Typical instruments: Big band; orchestra; percussion; electric organ; steel guitar
- Derivative forms: Space music; psychedelic rock; psychedelic pop; ambient music; post-rock

Subgenres
- Exotica; lounge; Sovietwave

Other topics
- Space rock; space music; surf music; experimental pop; mid-century modern

Space age pop or bachelor pad music is a subgenre of easy listening or lounge music associated with American and Mexican composers, songwriters, and bandleaders in the Space Age of the 1950s and 1960s. It drew on contemporary fascination with technology, outer space, and "exotic" locations, exploiting new audio technology such as stereophonic sound, multitrack recording, and early electronic instruments. Music journalist Irwin Chusid identifies the heyday of the genre as "roughly 1954 to 1963—from the dawn of high-fidelity (hi-fi) to the arrival of the Beatles." Major artists in the genre include Juan García Esquivel, Les Baxter, Enoch Light, Henry Mancini, The Tornados, Dick Hyman, and Jean-Jacques Perrey.

Amongst the major record producers at the time, Joe Meek was seen as a leading figure in the genre. As manager for the Tornados, he led them to a number one hit on the Billboard Hot 100 with "Telstar", making them the first British band to top the charts in the United States.

Among the major influences on space age pop were Impressionist composers such as Maurice Ravel and Claude Debussy, big band jazz, Hawaiian music, and contemporary Latin American styles such as samba, mambo, and calypso. There is much overlap between space age pop and contemporary exotica, surf music, beautiful music, and easy listening, and it may be regarded as a precursor to space music or other forms of ambient music. Space age pop albums often have titles and covers related to science fiction, featuring rockets, outer space vistas, and mid-century modern design, or emphasizing its intended audience of affluent, stylish bachelors in cocktail bars and lounges.

The genre saw a revival in interest in the 1990s, hand in hand with the contemporary swing revival and tiki revival which drew on related styles and aesthetics. Contemporary bands that took inspiration from the style were mixed in their approach, with some, such as Combustible Edison, seeking to revere and faithfully revive the style, while acts such as Mr. Bungle and Stereolab updated it with contemporary influences and offered postmodern commentary on easy listening styles' perceived Orientalism and celebration of conspicuous consumption.
