= The Moontrekkers =

British rock band of the early 1960s

The Moontrekkers were a British instrumental rock band in the early 1960s, who are best known for their minor chart hit "Night of the Vampire", arranged and produced by Joe Meek, and for their peripheral involvement in the early career of singer Rod Stewart.

== Career ==
The origins of the group lay in The Raiders, formed around 1960 in Hornsey, north London, by teenage school friends Gary Leport (b. 1945, guitar), Jimmy Raither (guitar), Peter Johnson (bass), Tony White (drums), and Robert Farrant (vocals). After Farrant left - later going on to record under the name Bobby Shafto - the group auditioned new singers, and replaced him with the 16-year-old Rod Stewart. They then won an audition with record producer Joe Meek, who liked the group but not their singer. Stewart left, and Meek persuaded the group to add keyboard player Peter Knight, and to change their name to The Moontrekkers. They recorded Leport's instrumental tune, "Night of the Vampire", at Meek's home studio in Islington, with Leport on lead guitar, Knight on clavioline, and Meek himself providing the eerie screams at the end of the record. The record was banned by the BBC as being "unsuitable for people of a nervous disposition" when released on the Parlophone label in 1961, but rose to #50 on the UK singles chart. The group toured in their own right, and also provided backing for singer Vince Eager.

In 1962, Leport, Johnson and White left the group. Knight and Raither continued, adding Bob Frost (bass) and Derek Dampier (drums). They released two further singles, "There's Something At The Bottom Of The Well" (1962) and "Moondust" (1963), without success in the UK although "Moondust" was a top ten hit in Sweden. The Moontrekkers broke up soon afterwards.

== Later activities ==
Peter Knight continued to play, with guitarist George Bellamy and drummer Max Temple. After leaving The Moontrekkers, Gary Leport formed The Dimensions with bass player Louis Cennamo in 1962. When singer Tommy Bishop left the group, Leport's old friend Rod Stewart joined as his replacement. In September 1963, the group were contracted to provide backing to singer Jimmy Powell, previously of The Rockin' Berries, with Stewart playing harmonica and the band being billed on a tour of the UK as Jimmy Powell & The Five Dimensions. Leport and Stewart both left the band before the end of 1963. Leport then retired from the music industry, but began performing again with semi-professional group Cut Glass in the late 1980s, and occasionally performed with Knight, Johnson and White as a re-formed Moontrekkers. In recent years Leport has performed with local Hampshire band The Plonkers, and with Bournemouth-based jazz quartet Swing 39.

The Moontrekkers' rhythm guitarist Jimmy Raither died in Scotland in 1993.

In 1995, the band performed at the Pipeline Instrumental Rock Convention in London, and again in 2001.

Bass player Peter Johnson died on 8 January 2021 of COVID-19, during the worldwide pandemic. Here is an interview with him on Hertbeat FM in 2007.

An arrangement of "Night of the Vampire", by composer and pianist Harry Whitney, was performed by the Kronos Quartet at Carnegie Hall in New York City in 2008.

== Discography ==
=== Singles ===
Year	Single	Chart Positions
Year	Single	UK
1961	"Night Of The Vampire"	50
1962	"There's Something At The Bottom Of The Well"	-
1963	"Moondust"	-

In Goldmine's British Invasion Record Price Guide, Tim Neely and Dave Thompson valued The Moontrekkers' singles, if in "near mint" condition, at $30 for "Night Of the Vampire" / "Melodic d'Armour", $15 for "There's Something At The Bottom Of The Well" / "Hatashiai", and $20 for "Moondust" / "The Bogey Man". In Record Collector's Rare Record Price Guide 2020, The Moontrekkers' singles, if in "mint" condition, were valued at £30 for "Night Of The Vampire" / "Melodic d'Armour", £30 for "There's Something At The Bottom Of The Well" / "Hatashiai", and £20 for "Moondust" / "The Bogey Man".
