= Heinz Burt =

German-born British rock musician (1942–2000)

Heinz

Background information
- Born: Heinz Burt; 24 July 1942; Detmold, Free State of Lippe, Germany
- Died: 7 April 2000 (aged 57) Eastleigh, Hampshire, England
- Genres: Instrumental rock; rock and roll; beat
- Instruments: Vocals; bass guitar; guitar
- Years active: Mid-1950s–2000
- Labels: Decca; Columbia (EMI); (UK); Tower (US)
- Formerly of: The Tornados

Heinz Burt (24 July 1942 – 7 April 2000) was a German-born British rock and roll bassist and singer of the 1960s, who performed under the stage name Heinz. He was also known as a member of the instrumental group the Tornados.

== Biography ==
=== Early life ===
Heinz was born in Detmold, Germany, but from the age of seven was brought up in Eastleigh, Hampshire, England. His German father had been killed during World War II and his mother decided to move to Britain. Heinz was influenced by the US singer Eddie Cochran and played in a local Eastleigh group, the Falcons, in the 1950s.

=== Musical career ===
Working in a Southampton grocery shop, Heinz came to the attention of record producer Joe Meek, becoming his protégé. Meek styled Heinz's image, which included persuading him to peroxide his hair.

Heinz was a member of the Tornados, famous for their multi-million selling hit Telstar. With Meek in love with Heinz, he struggled to launch him on a solo career. Due to the inadequacies of Heinz's voice, his vocals on his first single "Dreams Do Come True" were over-dubbed by another singer, a Meek artist named Mark Douglas or Billy Gray, but whose real name was William Halsey. The single was a commercial failure. With Meek vigorously promoting Heinz, he was sent on a tour with Gene Vincent and Jerry Lee Lewis. Audiences did not take to him, and he was attacked on stage and had beans thrown over him (to a contemporary audience 'Heinz' would have been associated with Heinz Baked Beans).

Heinz's next and biggest-selling solo hit was "Just Like Eddie", a tribute to Eddie Cochran. Its success coincided with the emergence of The Beatles and was the high point of commercial success for Heinz. Two successful EPs, Heinz and Live It Up, followed, and in 1963 he appeared in the British music-film Live It Up! as Ron. Following a well-received tour with Billy J. Kramer and the Dakotas and Bobby Rydell, Heinz was seen as belonging to an era of rock and roll as the more modern Merseybeat became more popular. He covered the Bob Dylan song "Don't Think Twice, It's Alright", which was another commercial failure.

A move from the Decca label to Columbia saw him gain a minor hit with "Diggin' My Potatoes". Differences on both a professional and personal level with Meek appeared, and with Heinz introducing his girlfriend to Meek, their relationship faltered. Although he had lived briefly in Meek's flat, further disagreements over royalties saw him move out, leaving some possessions behind including a shotgun. It was this shotgun with which Meek killed his landlady and then himself in 1967, and although Heinz was questioned by police, they concluded he had nothing to do with their deaths.

==== Backing groups ====
He was initially backed by the Saints, a band that included Roy Phillips, guitar, and Tab Martin, bass. His later backing groups (the Wild Ones or the Wild Boys) featured Ritchie Blackmore and others. Mick Underwood, Chas Hodges, Blackmore, and others performed on "Just Like Eddie" as members of the Outlaws. Heinz performed at the London Rock and Roll Show in 1972, with Wilko Johnson of Dr Feelgood in his backing band, as shown in the documentary Oil City Confidential.

=== Later life ===
Meek's death ended Heinz's recording career as a solo artist, and he worked outside the music industry including in advertising at a local newspaper, The Dagenham Post.

Although often dismissed as a mediocre talent pushed into the spotlight by Meek, Heinz was an enthusiastic performer, and worked in pantomime and theatre in the 1970s, including a role in David Hare's Teeth 'n' Smiles in 1976, as a dim-witted would-be rock star. In later years, he appeared in 1960s revival shows and continued performing until the end; his last set was from a wheelchair at a social club two weeks before his death.

== Personal life ==
=== Sexuality ===
Heinz was portrayed by JJ Feild in Telstar, a 2009 film about the life of Joe Meek. The film depicts him as Meek's gay lover at a time when homosexual acts were illegal in the United Kingdom. His family have denied that he was homosexual and have stated that the film is a slur. His former wife, Della Burke, who was married to Heinz at the height of his success said, "It is completely and utterly untrue. Heinz was definitely heterosexual." In the 1991 BBC documentary, The Very Strange Story of... the Legendary Joe Meek, when asked if Meek was in love with him, Heinz replied, "Yes. It's an infatuation ... that was the thing with him, where I told him to get off, that I wasn't into that sort of thing ... if there's something you can't have, you want it even more".

=== Death ===
Affected by motor neurone disease, Heinz died in 2000 aged 57, following a stroke. He was cremated at Southampton Crematorium in Hampshire. The service was held in the East Chapel. Telstar was played at the service.

== Discography ==
=== UK singles ===
- "Dreams Do Come True" (Meek) / "Been Invited to a Party" (Meek, Burt) – May 1963 – Decca F 11652
- "Just Like Eddie" (Goddard) / "Don't You Knock on My Door" – 1963 – Decca F11693 – UK No. 5
- "I Get Up in the Morning" (Meek) / "Talk Like A Man" / "That Lucky Old Sun" / "Lonely River" (Meek) – 1963 – Decca DFE 8545
- "Live It Up" (Meek) / "Don't You Understand" (Meek) / "When Your Loving Goes Wrong" (Meek) – 1963 – Decca DFE 8559
- "Country Boy" (Geoff Goddard) / "Long Tall Jack" (Meek/Lawrence) – 1963 – Decca F11768 – UK No. 26
- "You Were There" (Geoff Goddard) / "No Matter What They Say" (Meek/Lawrence) – 1964 – Decca F 11831 – UK No. 26
- "Please Little Girl" / "For Loving Me This Way" (Meek) – 1964 – Decca F 11920
- "Questions I Can't Answer" / "Beating of My Heart" (Meek) – 1964 – Columbia DB7374 – UK No. 39
- "Diggin' My Potatoes" (Trad, arr. Meek/Burt) / "She Ain't Coming Back" – 1965 – Columbia DB7482 – Heinz & Wild Boys – UK No. 49
- "End of the World" / "You Make Me Feel So Good" (Meek) – 1965 – Columbia DB 7656
- "Heart Full Of Sorrow" / "Don't Worry Baby" (Meek /Stephen Reading) – 1965 – Columbia DB 7779
- "Don't Think Twice, It's All Right" (Dylan) / "Big Fat Spider" (Meek/Davis) – 1965 – Columbia DB7559 – Heinz & Wild Boys
- "Movin' In" (Adams) / "I'm Not A Bad Guy" (J. Allison) – 1966 – Columbia DB 7942
- "Country Boy" (Geoff Goddard) / "Just Like Eddie" (Geoff Goddard) (Re-Recordings) – 1981 – Cargo CRS 010

=== US singles ===
- 1964: "Questions I Can't Answer" / "Beating of My Heart" – Tower 110
- 1965: "Digging My Potatoes" / "Don't Think Twice, It's Alright" – Tower 172
- 1965: "Don't Worry Baby" / "Heart Full Of Sorrow" – Tower 195
- 1966: "Movin' In" / "I'm Not A Bad Guy" – Tower 253

=== Albums ===
- Tribute to Eddie (Decca LK 4599, 1964)
- Live album – Various Artists; Live at The Cavern: "I Got a Woman" (live) / "Somebody to Love" (live) (Decca SLK 16294, 1965)
