= Lance Fortune =

English pop singer (1940–2025)

Christopher Morris (4 January 1940 – 29 May 2025), known by the stage name Lance Fortune, was an English pop singer.

== Life and career ==
Christopher Morris was born in Birkenhead, Cheshire, England on 4 January 1940. Morris was classically trained on piano. He formed a rock and roll group called the Firecrests while a student at Birkenhead School, and served as lead vocalist; they recorded the songs "That'll Be the Day", "I Knew From the Start", and "Party", but were strictly a local attraction. After leaving University early, Morris was discovered by impresario Larry Parnes while working and singing at the 2i's Coffee Bar in London. Parnes gave him the stage name Lance Fortune, a name he had previously considered for another artist he signed in 1959, Georgie Fame. The newly named Fortune signed to Pye Records as a solo artist, and released four singles, two of which became hits in the UK Singles Chart in 1960. "Be Mine" reached No. 4, whilst the follow-up, "This Love I Have For You" was a Top 30 hit.

In April 1960, Fortune and Jerry Keller replaced Eddie Cochran on Gene Vincent's then current UK tour, after Cochran's untimely death in a road accident.

In the 1960s, Fortune joined a group called the Staggerlees.

Fortune died on 29 May 2025, at the age of 85.

== Releases ==
- "Be Mine" / "Action" (Pye Records, 1960) UK No. 4
- "All on My Own" / "This Love I Have For You" (Pye, 1960) – B-side UK No. 26
- "I Wonder" / "Will You Still be My Girl" (Pye, 1960)
- "Who's Gonna Tell Me?" / "Love Is the Sweetest Thing" (Pye, 1961)
