= Mike Berry (singer) =

British singer (1942–2025)

- Born: Michael Hubert Bourne; 24 September 1942; Northampton, England
- Died: 11 April 2025 (aged 82); Kingston upon Thames, London, England
- Occupations: Singer; actor
- Years active: 1960–2025
- Spouse: Susan Berry (m. 1982)
- Children: 2
- Website: mikeberry.net

Michael Hubert Bourne (24 September 1942 – 11 April 2025), known professionally as Mike Berry, was an English rock and roll singer and actor, known for the top ten hits "Don't You Think It's Time" (1963) and "The Sunshine of Your Smile" (1980) and for portraying Mr. Spooner in the British sitcom Are You Being Served?

== Early life ==
Berry was born in Northampton. His parents had grown up in Rhodesia but met in England. His mother was an amateur actress and singer. Six months after his birth his mother moved with him to North Wales for two years. The family then moved to Stoke Newington, London where he attended William Patten Primary School and passed his eleven plus exam, winning a scholarship to Hackney Downs Grocers' School. He left the school aged 16 without qualifications to become an apprentice compositor.

== Career ==
=== Music ===
Berry was a fan of skiffle and rock and roll music as a teenager and he formed his own skiffle group called the Rebels and then introduced electric guitars as Kenny Lord and the Statesmen. Joe Meek became their recording manager and producer, and he signed up a group called the Stormers as his new back-up band, naming the new group Mike Berry and the Outlaws.

Berry had three hits in the 1960s on the UK Singles Chart; his most successful being "Don't You Think It's Time", reaching No. 6 in January 1963. His "Tribute to Buddy Holly" is also noted for having been banned by the BBC for being "morbid." The hit singles were all produced by Joe Meek. In 1972, his album Drift Away was released on York FYK 409. It contained "Drift Away", the first version of the song to be released, as well as "Take Me Home Country Roads".

In the mid-1970s, Berry returned to the charts in the Netherlands and Belgium, as pirate radio station Radio Mi Amigo and Radio Veronica played his new record material, released on Dutch record label Pink Elephant Records. "Don't Be Cruel" made No. 14 on the Dutch Nationale Hitparade in May 1975. His next record, a remake of his 1960 debut song "Tribute to Buddy Holly", hit No. 2 in October of that same year. In 1977, "I'm a Rocker", released on Flemish record label Scramble Records (owned by Radio Mi Amigo DJ Norbert), failed to chart.

In 1980, he had a chart success in the UK, with "The Sunshine of Your Smile", a cover of a romantic song which was produced by Chas Hodges; this had originally been written before the First World War and recorded by Jessie Broughton in about 1915. In 1985, his song "Everyone's a Wally" was included as the B-side to the video game by Mikro-Gen of the same name. His most recent CD was About Time Too!, recorded in Nashville, Tennessee with the Crickets and released on the UK label Rollercoaster Records, Berry's label of choice since their reissue of Joe Meek productions and new material from the 1990s. In 1988, Berry co-wrote "This Is the Kiss" with Mel Simpson which was chosen to be among the final eight songs in A Song for Europe (the UK selection vehicle for the Eurovision Song Contest) performed by Two-Che. The song placed second with 73,785 televotes.

In 2016, Berry auditioned for the fifth series of The Voice but was not successful. The following year, in 2017, he went on a UK tour with The Solid Gold Rock'n'Roll Show, which featured Eden Kane, Mark Wynter, Marty Wilde and the Wildcats. In 2019, he toured again with The Solid Gold Rock'n'Roll Show, alongside Marty Wilde, Charlie Gracie, Nancy Ann Lee (Little Miss Sixties) and the Wildcats.

=== Acting ===
In the 1970s, Berry developed a career as an actor and he appeared in many television commercials. In 1979, he was cast as the father (Mr. Peters) of the two children in the TV version of the Worzel Gummidge books, along with Jon Pertwee and Una Stubbs. In 1981, his character, Bert Spooner, replaced Trevor Bannister's character (Mr. Lucas) in the British sitcom Are You Being Served? as the show's resident heartthrob. Thereafter, Berry stayed until the end of the show's run in 1985 but did not appear in the sequel series Grace & Favour. After the death of Nicholas Smith in December 2015 he was the only surviving male actor from the show who played a starring character. Vivienne Johnson and Penny Irving, who played both of the show's ruling Grace brothers' nurse and secretary, respectively, are the last remaining female living cast members.

Berry also starred in a series of commercials for Blue Riband in the 1980s. His most recent film work was acting in Julie and the Cadillacs (1999).

== Personal life and death ==
His brother was drag performer, actor and activist Bette Bourne (1939–2024).

Berry died on 11 April 2025, at the age of 82.

== Discography ==
=== Albums ===
- Drift Away (1972), York
- Tribute to Buddy Holly (1975), Pink Elephant
- The Rocker (1977), Scramble
- I'm a Rocker (1979), Epic
- The Sunshine of Your Smile (1980), Polydor
- Memories (1981), Polydor
- Still Rockin' (1987)
- Rock'N'Roll Daze (Mike Berry & the Outlaws) (1998), Rollercoaster
- Keep Your Hands to Yourself (Mike Berry & the Outlaws) (2001), Rollercoaster
- About Time Too! (Mike Berry & the Crickets) (2005), Rollercoaster

=== Singles ===
- "Will You Love Me Tomorrow" / "My Baby Doll" (with the Outlaws – Decca 11314 – 1961)
- "Tribute to Buddy Holly" / "What's the Matter" (with the Outlaws – His Master's Voice 912 – 1961) – UK No. 24
- "It's Just a Matter of Time" / "Little Boy Blue" (with the Admirals (Outlaws) – HMV 979 – 1962)
- "Every Little Kiss" / "How Many Times" (HMV 1042 – 1962)
- "Don't You Think It's Time" / "Loneliness" (with the Outlaws – HMV 1105 – 1962) – UK No. 6
- "My Little Baby" / "You'll Do It You'll Fall in Love" (with the Outlaws – HMV 1142 – 1963) – UK No. 34
- "It Really Doesn't Matter" / "Try a Little Bit Harder" (HMV 1194 – 1963)
- "Intro" / "Brown Eyed Handsome Man" (Graham Dean / The Innocents – Columbia 1536 – 1963)
- "My Little Baby" / "More Than I Can Say" (with the Innocents – Columbia 1536 – 1963)
- "La Bamba" / "Don't You Think It's Time" (with the Innocents – Columbia 1536 – 1963)
- "On My Mind" / "This Little Girl" (with the Innocents – HMV 1257 – 1964)
- "Lovesick" / "Letters of Love" (with the Innocents – HMV 1284 – 1964)
- "Who Will It Be" / "Talk" (with the Innocents – HMV 1314 – 1964)
- "Two Lovers" / "Don't Try to Stand in My Way" (HMV 1362 – 1964)
- "That's All I Ever Want from You" / "She Didn't Care" (HMV 1449 – 1965)
- "It Comes and Goes" / "Gonna Fall in Love" (HMV 1484 – 1965)
- "Warm Baby" / "Just Thought I'd Phone" (HMV 1530 – 1966)
- "Raining in My Heart" / "Eyes" (Polydor 56182 – 1967)
- "Can't You Hear My Heartbeat" / "Alice" (D-Metronome – 1967)
- "Drift Away" / "Keep My Eyes on the Road" (York Records – SYK 530 – 1972)
- "Don't Be Cruel" / "It's All Over" (Pink Elephant Records – 1975)
- "Tribute to Buddy Holly" (re-recording) / "Dial My Up" (Pink Elephant Records – 1975)
- "I'm a Rocker" / "It's a Hard Hard Hard World" (Scramble Records – 1977)
- "Don't Ever Change" (Polydor – 1978)
- "The Sunshine of Your Smile" (Polydor – 1980) – UK No. 9
- "If I Could Only Make You Care" (Polydor – 1980) – UK No. 37
- "Memories" (Polydor – 1981) – UK No. 55
- "Diana" (Polydor – 1981)
- "What'll I Do" (Polydor – 1982)
- "Every Little While" (Rockney – 1983) – UK No. 78
- "Everyone's a Wally" (B-side to cassette release of computer game – 1985)
- "Come Outside" (with Wendy Richard – WEA – 1986) – UK No. 97
- It's Time for Mike Berry – vinyl EP (Rollercoaster Records – 1990)
- "Sounds of the Sixties" (Rollercoaster Records – 1992)
- "Rock'n'Roll Daze" (Rollercoaster Records – 1998)
- "Keep Your Hands to Yourself – Live in Sweden" (Rollercoaster Records – 2001)
- About Time Too! (with the Crickets, recorded in Nashville – Rollercoaster Records – 2005)
- Before I Grow Too Old – CD EP (Rollercoaster Records – 2006)
- "Hi There Darlin'! Merry Christmas" (Mr. Bert Spooner with instrumental accompaniment by Mike Berry & the Outlaws – Rollercoaster Records – 2007)
- "Sunshine of Your Smile – Hits and Memories from the 1980s" (Rollercoaster Records – 2016)
- "Drift Away" (Rollercoaster Records – 2019)
