= Howard S. Berger =

American screenwriter

Howard S. Berger is a filmmaker, co-winner of the "Best Screenplay" award for Love and Support (Dances With Films Festival, 2001), and winner of a Fantafestival (Italy, 1996) film award for his film Original Sins.

In October 2007, he and long-time friend and collaborator Kevin Marr re-dubbed themselves "The Flying Maciste Brothers" and started the cinema-related website "Destructible Man", which deals exclusively with the literal and figurative uses of the special effect of the dummy-death in film.

== Filmography ==
1. A Life in the Death of Joe Meek (2012)
2. DJ Khaled Makes a Video: Grammy Family (2006) (TV)
3. Lil Jon Makes a Video: Snap Yo Fingers (2006) (TV)
4. DJ Khaled Makes a Video: Holla at Me (2006) (TV)
5. Ying Yang Twins Make a Video (2005) (TV)
6. Original Sins (1994)
