= Houston Wells and the Marksmen =

British country band

Houston Wells and the Marksmen were a British country band, that were most successful in the early 1960s. They had one UK hit single in August 1963 with "Only the Heartaches". They were also known for their association with experimental producer Joe Meek, and were one of the UK's first professional country bands.

== Houston Wells ==
Houston Wells (born Andrew Smith on 25 February 1932 in Northumberland, England) was a British country singer. In 1958 in Southend-on-Sea, Smith joined a band called the Coasters, and renamed themselves Andy Smith and the Coasters. There was already an American group with the same name, so they changed their name to the Marksmen. Their record company, Parlophone Records, decided that 'Smith' was too plain a name for a singer, and renamed him Houston Wells. After some minor chart success, the Marksmen felt that they were being exploited by Wells and his management, and tore up his return ticket home during a trip to Ireland and removed him from the group. He then recorded with another group 'The Outlaws,' but never had another UK chart hit. He later worked as a logger. Wells died on 28 December 2013 in Taupō, New Zealand.

== Career ==
Houston Wells and the Marksmen attained a UK Singles Chart hit in August 1963 with "Only the Heartaches" (No. 22, 10 weeks). The song is a cowboy version of the traditional ballad "The Unfortunate Rake", with lyrics by Wayne Walker. Record producer Joe Meek was interested in country music and took an interest in Houston Wells and the Marksmen. The band recorded 28 tracks with Meek.
