= Telstar (instrumental) =

1962 single by the Tornados

- German picture sleeve

Single by the Tornados

from the album The Original Telstar: The Sounds of the Tornadoes
- B-side: "Jungle Fever"
- Released: 17 August 1962
- Recorded: 22 July 1962
- Studio: RGM Sound, London
- Genre: Space age pop; surf rock; rock and roll
- Length: 3:15
- Label: Decca (UK); London (USA)
- Songwriter: Joe Meek
- Producer: Joe Meek

The Tornados singles chronology
"Love and Fury" (1961)	"Telstar" (1962)	"Globetrotter" (1963)

Audio sample
- file; help

"Telstar" is a 1962 instrumental by the English band the Tornados, written and produced by Joe Meek. It reached number one on the UK Singles Chart and the US Billboard Hot 100 in December 1962 (the second British recording to reach number one on that chart the same year, after "Stranger on the Shore" in May). It was the second instrumental single to hit number one in 1962 on both the US and UK weekly charts. (Note: "Stranger on the Shore" did make number one on the Billboard Hot 100, the Record Mirror and NME weekly charts and also topped the end of year charts.)

Later in 1962, Meek produced a vocal version, "Magic Star", sung by Kenny Hollywood. It was released as a single by Decca Records (cat. nr F11546), with "The Wonderful Story of Love" on the B-side, written by Geoff Goddard. The musical director for both songs was Ivor Raymonde.

== Background ==
"Telstar" was named after the Telstar communications satellite, which was launched into orbit on 10 July 1962. Written and produced by Joe Meek, it featured either a clavioline or the similar Jennings Univox, both keyboard instruments with distinctive electronic sounds. It was recorded in Meek's studio in a small flat above a shop in Holloway Road, North London. "Telstar" won an Ivor Novello Award and is estimated to have sold at least five million copies worldwide.

In 2007, Tim Wheeler of Ash wrote that "Telstar" was one of the earliest pop tracks influenced by science fiction, and that "for its time it was so futuristic and it still sounds pretty weird today". He observed the influence of "Telstar" in the 2006 single "Knights of Cydonia" by Muse; Muse's singer and guitarist, Matt Bellamy, is the son of the Tornados' guitarist George Bellamy. British Prime Minister Margaret Thatcher named "Telstar" as her favourite piece of music.

== Lawsuits ==
French composer Jean Ledrut accused Joe Meek of plagiarism, claiming that the tune of "Telstar" had been copied from "La Marche d'Austerlitz", a piece from a score that Ledrut had written for the film Austerlitz (1960). This led to a lawsuit that prevented Meek from receiving royalties from the record during his lifetime, and the issue was only resolved, in Meek's favour, three weeks after his suicide in 1967. Austerlitz was not released in the UK until 1965, and Meek was unaware of the film when the lawsuit was filed in March 1963.

== Commercial performance ==
The record was an immediate hit after its release, remaining in the UK Singles Chart for 25 weeks, five of them at number 1, and in the American charts for 16 weeks. "Telstar" was the first U.S. number one by a British group. Prior to this, only two British solo artists had achieved a U.S. number one: "Auf Wiederseh'n, Sweetheart" by Vera Lynn (1952); and "Stranger on the Shore" by Acker Bilk (May 1962).

According to the Official Charts Company, it was the second instrumental number one of 1962 in the UK, the first being "Wonderful Land" by the Shadows, which was number one for more weeks than any other single that year (eight).

== Track listing ==
1. "Telstar"
2. "Jungle Fever"

== Personnel ==
=== The Tornados ===
- Clem Cattini – drums
- Alan Caddy – guitar
- Roger LaVern – additional keyboards
- George Bellamy – rhythm guitar
- Heinz Burt – bass

=== Additional personnel ===
- Joe Meek – composer, producer
- Geoff Goddard – clavioline (on both sides) plus wordless vocals in the final playing of the theme (also on both sides)
- Dave Adams – transcription of Meek's composition recording

== Charts ==
Chart (1962–1963)	Peak position
Australia	2
Belgian Singles Chart	1
Canadian Singles Chart	1
Dutch Singles Chart	3
Irish Singles Chart	1
New Zealand (ONZMC)	1
Norwegian Singles Chart	3
South African Singles Chart	1
UK Singles Chart	1
US Billboard Hot 100	1
US Black Singles (Billboard)	5
West German Singles Chart	6

== Cover versions ==
Numerous cover versions of "Telstar" were released, including one by The Ventures, another with lyrics entitled "Magic Star" by Margie Singleton, a French version by Colette Deréal, and an electronic disco instrumental by Richard Pinhas as T.H.X. The Spotnicks from Sweden already were known for wearing "space suit" costumes on stage.

== See also ==
- "Early Bird", 1965 instrumental named after Intelsat I
