= The Outlaws (band) =

British instrumental rock band

- Also known as: The Chaps, The Rally Rounders, The Raleigh Rounders, The Six Shooters, The Admirals, The Lancasters, The Ritchie Blackmore Orchestra, Mike Berry & The Outlaws
- Origin: London, England
- Genres: Instrumental rock; pop
- Years active: 1960–1965
- Label: His Master's Voice
- Past members: Chas Hodges; Billy Kuy; Bobby Graham; Reg Hawkins; Ken Lundgren; Don Groom; Rodger Mingaye; Mick Underwood; Ritchie Blackmore; Harvey Hinsley; Lorne Greene

The Outlaws were an English instrumental band that recorded in the early 1960s. Members included Chas Hodges (1943–2018), Bobby Graham (1940–2009), Ritchie Blackmore (born 1945), Mick Underwood (1945–2024), Reg Hawkins (born 1942), Billy Kuy (born 1940), Don Groom (born 1939), Roger Mingaye (born 1942), Ken Lundgren (1941–2019) and Harvey Hinsley (born 1948).

== Career ==
Their name was originally conceived by Joe Meek, who needed a backing group for Mike Berry's "Set Me Free" in 1960 after Meek (according to his biographer John Repsch) had fired Berry's original backing group, The Statesmen. After that recording, they continued as one of the house bands of his recording studio at 304 Holloway Road, London. As such, they were used for recordings, demos and auditions. Many of their songs were written by Meek and credited to one or other of his pseudonyms, either Robert Duke or Peter Jacobs; the latter of which he used on The Outlaws' "Shake with Me".

They appeared as themselves in the 1963 British film Live It Up!.

In addition to featuring as a backing band on recordings by Mike Berry, including three hit singles, or backing Houston Wells, Gene Vincent, John Leyton, Geoff Goddard or Heinz, they also recorded singles in their own right. One of these, "Bike Beat", for Raleigh Bicycle Company, even had dance instructions created especially for it, printed on the picture sleeve with bicycle references: "Grab a girl at random, make like a tandem".

In 1990, all of their 1960s singles were issued on The Outlaws Ride Again (the Singles A's and B's), on the See For Miles Label.

== Later years ==
Harvey Hinsley would later join the group Hot Chocolate who would have hits with "You Sexy Thing" and "Every 1's a Winner". Chas Hodges was later in the duo Chas & Dave. Ritchie Blackmore became the most famous former member of The Outlaws, having a successful career as a member of Deep Purple and Ritchie Blackmore's Rainbow.

== Discography ==
=== Singles ===
With the line-up : Billy Kuy, Bobby Graham, Chas Hodges, Reg Hawkins

- "Swingin' Low" b/w "Spring is Near" (March 1961) – UK No. 46
- "Ambush" b/w "Indian Brave" (June 1961) – UK No. 43
- "Valley of the Sioux" b/w "Crazy Drums" (September 1961)

With the line-up : Ken Lundgren, Don Groom, Chas Hodges, Roger Mingaye

- "Ku-Pow!" b/w "Last Stage West" (February 1962)
- "Sioux Serenade" b/w "Fort Knox" (12 October 1962)

With the line-up : Mick Underwood, Ken Lundgren, Chas Hodges, Ritchie Blackmore

- "Poppin' Medley Part 1". b/w "Poppin' Medley Part 2". Released as The Chaps (7 December 1962) Parlophone R4979
- "Return of The Outlaws" b/w "Texan Spiritual" (February 1963)
- "That Set the Wild West Free" b/w "Hobo" (August 1963) Note : Underwood does not appear on "Hobo"
- "Law and Order" b/w "Do Da Day" (December 1963)
- "Keep a Knockin'" b/w "Shake with Me" (3 April 1964). Note : John Peel credits "Shake with Me" as the first Heavy Metal recording, according to the liner notes of the CD 'The Outlaws Ride Again (Singles A's and B's)'
- "The Bike Beat 1" b/w "The Bike Beat 2" as The Rally Rounders (1964) Lyntone LYN 573 : Flexidisc (for Raleigh Bicycle Company)

With the line-up : Mick Underwood, Ken Lundgren, Chas Hodges, Harvey Hinsley

- "Don't Cry" b/w "Only for You" (February 1965). Note: United States only, vocal single, produced by Derek Lawrence. The b-side to this release features Mick Underwood, Chas Hodges, Ritchie Blackmore and Nicky Hopkins.

=== Album ===
With the line-up : Billy Kuy, Bobby Graham, Chas Hodges, Reg Hawkins

- Dream of the West (1961):

"Dream Of The West" / "The Outlaws" / "Husky Team" / "Rodeo" / "Smoke Signals" / "Ambush" / "Barbecue" / "Spring Is Near" / "Indian Brave" / "Homeward Bound" / "Western Sunset" / "Tune For Short Cowboys" (His Master's Voice, December 1961). Re-released on CD with bonus tracks : "Swingin' Low" / "Valley Of The Sioux" / "Crazy Drums" (2012, Coronet)

=== Compilations ===
- Rockin' Guitar – Rare Items Vol.6 :

"Swingin' Low" / "Valley Of The Sioux" / "Crazy Drums" / "Ku-Pow" / "Last Stage West" / "Sioux Serenade" / "Fort Knox" / "Return Of The Outlaws" / " Texan Spiritual" / "That Set The Wild West Free" / "Hobo" / "Law And Order" / "Do Da Day" (1985, Gibson)

- Ride Again – The Singles As & Bs :

"Swingin' Low" / "Spring Is Near" / "Ambush" / "Indian Brave" / "Valley of the Sioux" / "Crazy Drums" / "Last Stage West" / "Ku-Pow" / "Sioux Serenade" / "Fort Knox" / "The Return of the Outlaws" / "Texan Spiritual" / "That Set the Wild West Free" / "Hobo" / "Law and Order" / "Do-Da-Day" / "Keep a Knockin'" / "Shake with Me" (1990, See For Miles Records)

- Back To The West :

"Swingin' Low" / "Spring Is Near" / "Ambush" / "Indian Brave" / "Dream Of The West" / "The Outlaws" / "Husky Team" / "Rodeo" / "Smoke Signals" / "Barbecue" / "Homeward Bound" / "Western Sunset" / "Tune For Short Cowboys" / "Valley Of The Sioux" / "Crazy Drums" / "Last Stage West" / "Ku-Pow" / "Sioux Serenade" / "Fort Knox" / "The Return Of The Outlaws" / "Texan Spiritual" / "That Set The Wild West Free" / "Hobo" / "Law And Order" / "Do-Da-Day" / "Keep A Knockin'" / "Shake With Me" (2003, Prospector) Re-released with bonus tracks : The Chaps : "Poppin' [Part 1]" / "Poppin' [Part 2]" / The Raleigh Rounders : "Bike Beat [Part 1]" / "Bike Beat [Part 2]" / The Lancastrians : "Satan's Holiday" / "Earthshaker" (2007, Norf*k Coast Records)

- The Best Of The Outlaws :

"Ambush" / "Swingin' Low" / "Valley Of The Sioux" / "Indian Brave" / "Rodeo" / "Barbecue" / "Husky Team" / "Homeward Bound" / "The Outlaws" / "Fort Knox" / "Crazy Drums" / "Sioux Serenade" / "Last Stage West" / "Western Sunset" / "Ku-Pow!" / "Dream Of The West" / "Smoke Signals" / "Spring Is Near" / "Tune For Short Cowboys" / The Chaps : "Poppin' [Part 1]" / "Poppin' [Part 2]" + 7 songs as backing band for Mike Berry (2020, Not Now Music)
