= The Tornados =

English instrumental rock group

- Origin: London, England
- Genres: Space age pop; instrumental rock; surf rock; beat; British rock and roll
- Years active: 1961–1967; 1975
- Labels: Decca, Columbia (EMI) (UK); London (US/Canada)
- Website: thetornados.net

The Tornados were an English instrumental rock group of the 1960s that acted as backing group for many of record producer Joe Meek's productions and also for singer Billy Fury. They enjoyed several chart hits in their own right, including the 1962 song "Telstar", which became their first No. 1 hit on the UK Singles Chart and, in December 1962, the second ever No. 1 single by a British act on the US Billboard Hot 100 singles chart. (Note: The first British artist to reach No. 1 on the US Hot 100 chart, in May 1962, was Acker Bilk with "Stranger on the Shore". In 1952, before the creation of the Hot 100, Billboard had four complimentary charts in use. That year, with the song "Auf Wiederseh'n, Sweetheart", British artist Vera Lynn (accompanied by the Soldiers and Airmen of Her Majesty's Forces and the Johnny Johnston Singers) reached No. 1 on all four charts.)

== History ==
The Tornados were formed in 1961 as a session band for Joe Meek, although the name did not come until early 1962. In 1961 they provided the instrumentals for the film short The Johnny Leyton Touch, including a jazzed up version of "Taboo", originally by Margarita Lecuona. From January 1962 to August 1963, the Tornados were the backing band for Billy Fury (as well as recording and performing as an act in their own right); they toured and recorded with Fury as the Tornados. Their recordings with Fury were produced by Mike Smith and Ivor Raymonde.

The Tornados made a scopitone film (an early form of music video) for "Telstar" and another for their chart hit "Robot" featuring members of the group walking around a woodland dressed in appropriate headgear with their guitars, flirting with various young women and being finally arrested by policemen after lighting a campfire.

For a time the Tornados were considered serious rivals to the Shadows. The Tornados' single "Globetrotter" made it to no. 5 in the UK Singles Chart. However, pop instrumentals began to lose a following with the British audience during 1963 as the "Mersey Sound", from the Beatles and other groups, began to take root. In the summer of 1963, Joe Meek induced the Tornados' bassist Heinz Burt to start a solo career, as the Tornados' chart success as an instrumental outfit waned, and from that point onwards the Tornados began to fall apart. By 1965 none of the original line-up remained.

On some promotional items, later line-ups were credited as "Tornados '65" and "The New Tornados", but these names were never used on the Tornados' releases. In the mid-1960s the Tornados backed Billy Fury again, with Dave Watts on keyboards, Robby Gale on guitar and John Davies on drums. In 1968, in Israel to perform in Mandy Rice-Davies' night club Mandys, the band stayed for a ten-week tour after which they disbanded, leaving Watts and Huxley in Israel, playing with the Lions of Judea and the Churchills, respectively.

=== Later years ===
After drummer and bandleader Clem Cattini left the Tornados in 1965, he became a successful session musician, playing on recording sessions for other artists, and was featured in Cliff Richard's backing bands. He holds the record for appearing the most times on UK no. 1 singles.

The rhythm guitarist, George Bellamy, is the father of Matt Bellamy of the alternative rock band Muse.

They re-formed as the New Tornados in the early 1970s as the backing group for Marty Wilde, Billy Fury and others on a year-long UK Rock n Roll Tour. They continued for another few years with lead guitarist Antz Cowell, bassist Willie Bath, saxophonist Robin Foster and drummer Jon Werrell. They also toured with original members Norman Hale and Heinz Burt, plus "The King of Rock Roll" Carl Simmons. The group was often part of a 1960s package with other artists, including Wee Willie Harris and Screaming Lord Sutch.

During a break in touring, Jon Werrell loaned his Silver Premier drum kit to John Bonham when Led Zeppelin played their famous impromptu December 1975 gig at Behans St Helier while tax exiles in Jersey.

In 1975, Clem Cattini, Roger LaVern, Heinz Burt and George Bellamy reunited and released a version of "Telstar" as the 'Original Tornados'. In the 1970s, Billy Fury formed a new backing band called Fury's Tornados with a completely unrelated line-up. They also recorded and released a version of "Telstar" in the mid-1970s.

Legal rights to the Tornados name were owned by Cattini and LaVern and in 1989, LaVern formed his own Tornados band with David Graham on guitar, David Harvey on bass, Bip Wetherwell on keys, and female singer Lynn Alice (who died in 1999). Colin Farley of the Cutting Crew joined the band in the late 1990s after Harvey left. They were still touring as of 2002.

In 1996, Ray Randall wrote and recorded a three-track CD with Bryan Irwin and Stuart Taylor, using the band name Ray Randall's Tornados, as a tribute to the late Joe Meek, 30 years after Meek's death. Randall has since recorded a solo album entitled Polly Swallow (1997).

In 2002, the Tornados performed at the Pipeline Instrumental Rock Convention in London.

In 2005, Dave Watts (who was the Tornados keyboard player from 1965 to 1967) formed "Dave Watt's Tornados". They still tour as of 2025.

In 2007, Panda Bear sampled two Tornados songs on his album Person Pitch.

=== "Do You Come Here Often?" ===
The B-side of the final single that the group released, in 1966, "Do You Come Here Often?", is considered to be the first openly "gay" pop record release by a UK major label. It started off as a standard organ-inspired instrumental, but Joe Meek decided that the organ playing was a little too jazzy for the style of the group. To remedy this, around two-thirds in, a casual conversation between what appears to be two gay men (Dave Watts playing keyboards and Robb Huxley playing guitar) was overdubbed. The song was featured, along with other gay-flavoured releases, on a 2006 compilation CD, Queer Noises.

== Former members ==
- Heinz Burt – bass (1960–1963)
- Clem Cattini – drums (1960–1965)
- Norman Hale – keyboards (1962)
- Roger LaVern – keyboards (1962–1964)
- George Bellamy – rhythm guitar (1962–1965)
- Alan Caddy – lead guitar (1962–1964)
- Brian Gregg – bass (1963)
- Tab Martin – bass (1963)
- Ray Randall – bass (1963–1966)
- Jimmy O'Brien – keyboards (1964–1965)
- Stuart Taylor – lead guitar (1964–1965)
- Tony Marsh – keyboards (1965)
- Peter Adams – drums (1965–1966)
- Dave Cameron – lead guitar (1965–1966)
- Bryan Irwin – rhythm guitar (1965–1966)
- Roger Warwick – tenor saxophone (1965–1966)
- Dave Watts – keyboards (1965–1967) (2005 - 2025)
- John Davies – drums (1966–1967)
- Pete Holder – lead guitar, vocals (1966–1967)
- Roger Holder – bass (1966–1967)
- Robb Huxley – lead guitar (1966–1967)

== Discography ==
=== Albums ===
- The Original Telstar – The Sounds of the Tornadoes (London, 1962) (only released in North America and Australasia) – US no. 45
- Away from It All (Decca, 1963)
- We Want Billy! (Decca, 1963) (with Billy Fury, live album) – UK no. 14
- The World of the Tornados (Decca Records, 1972)
- Remembering... the Tornados (Decca Records, 1976)
- Away From It All (Deram, 1994)
- The EP Collection (See for Miles Records, 1996)
- Tornados Now (Startel Records, 1997)
- Telstar (Castle Pie Records, 1999)
- Science Fiction (Secret Records, 2007)

=== EPs ===
| Year | EP Title | Details | Peak chart positions |
| Year | EP Title | Details | UK |
|---|---|---|---|
| 1962 | The Sounds of the Tornados | Released: October 1962; Label: Decca | 2 |
| 1962 | Telstar | Released: November 1962; Label: Decca | 4 |
| 1963 | Globetrotter | Released: February 1963; Label: Decca; France-only release | — |
| 1963 | More Sounds from the Tornados | Released: March 1963; Label: Decca | 8 |
| 1963 | Billy Fury & the Tornados | Released: 29 March 1963; Label: Decca; With Billy Fury | 2 |
| 1963 | Robot | Released: April 1963; Label: Decca; France-only release | — |
| 1963 | Tornado Rock | Released: July 1963; Label: Decca | 7 |
| 1963 | Ready Teddy | Released: November 1963; Label: Decca; France-only release | — |
| 1963 | Chattanooga Choo Choo | Released: December 1963; Label: Decca; France-only release | — |
| 1964 | Hot Pot | Released: July 1964; Label: Decca; France-only release | — |
| 1966 | Granada | Released: 1966; Label: La Voz de Su Amo (His Master's Voice); Spain-only release | — |
"—" denotes releases that did not chart or were not released

=== Singles ===
| Year | Single | Peak chart positions | | | | | | | | | |
| Year | Single | AUS | BE (FLA) | GER | IRE | NL | NOR | NZ | UK | US | US R&B |
|---|---|---|---|---|---|---|---|---|---|---|---|
| 1962 | "Love and Fury" b/w "Popeye Twist" | — | — | — | — | — | — | — | — | — | — |
| 1962 | "Telstar" b/w "Jungle Fever" | 2 | 1 | 6 | 1 | 3 | 3 | 1 | 1 | 1 | 5 |
| 1963 | "Globetrotter" b/w "Locomotion with Me" | 15 | — | — | — | — | — | 5 | 5 | — | — |
| 1963 | "Ridin' the Wind" (US and Canada-only release) b/w "The Breeze and I" | — | — | — | — | — | — | — | — | 63 | — |
| 1963 | "Robot" b/w "Life on Venus" | 44 | — | — | — | — | — | — | 17 | — | — |
| 1963 | "The Ice Cream Man" b/w "Theme from "Scales of Justice"" | — | — | — | — | — | — | — | 18 | — | — |
| 1963 | "Dragonfly" b/w "Hymn for Teenagers" | 96 | — | — | — | — | — | — | 41 | — | — |
| 1964 | "Hot Pot" b/w "Joystick" | 38 | — | — | — | — | — | — | — | — | — |
| 1964 | "Monte Carlo" b/w "Blue, Blue, Blue Beat" | 72 | — | — | — | — | — | — | — | — | — |
| 1964 | "Exodus" b/w "Blackpool Rock" | 56 | — | — | — | — | — | — | — (Note: "Exodus" did not chart on the Record Retailer chart, but did reach no. 50 on the Melody Maker.) | — | — |
| 1965 | "Granada" b/w "Ragunboneman" | — | — | — | — | — | — | — | — | — | — |
| 1965 | "Early Bird" b/w "Stompin' Through the Rye" | — | — | — | — | — | — | — | — (Note: "Early Bird" did not chart on the Record Retailer chart, but did reach no. 49 on the Melody Maker.) | — | — |
| 1965 | "Stingray" b/w "Aqua Marina" | — | — | — | — | — | — | — | — | — | — |
| 1966 | "Pop-Art Goes Mozart" b/w "Too Much in Love to Hear" | — | — | — | — | — | — | — | — | — | — |
| 1966 | "Is That a Ship I Hear" b/w "Do You Come Here Often" | — | — | — | — | — | — | — | — | — | — |
| 1975 | "Telstar" (as 'Original Tornados') b/w "Red Rocket" | — | — | — | — | — | — | — | — | — | — |
"—" denotes releases that did not chart or were not released
