= WKNR =

Sports radio station in Cleveland, Ohio

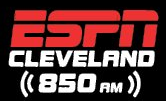
- Cleveland, Ohio; United States
- Broadcast area: Greater Cleveland
- Frequency: 850 kHz
- Branding: 850 ESPN Cleveland

Programming
- Language: English
- Format: Sports
- Affiliations: Cleveland Browns; ESPN Radio; Motor Racing Network; Ohio State Buckeyes

Ownership
- Owner: Good Karma Sports; (Good Karma Broadcasting, LLC)

History
- First air date: December 31, 1926 (Note: Originally licensed to Mansfield; moved to Akron in 1932, and then to Cleveland in 1943.)
- Former call signs: WLBV (1926–1929); WJW (1929–1985); WRMR (1985–2001)
- Former frequencies: 1300 kHz (1926–1927); 1450 kHz (1927–1928); 1210 kHz (1928–1941); 1240 kHz (1941–1944)
- Call sign meaning: Previously used on the current WHKW

Technical information
- Licensing authority: FCC
- Facility ID: 28509
- Class: B
- Power: 50,000 watts (day); 4,700 watts (night)
- Transmitter coordinates: 41°19′0.19″N 81°43′50.47″W

Links
- Public license information: Public file; LMS
- Webcast: Listen live
- Website: www.espn.com/cleveland/

WKNR (850 AM) – branded as 850 ESPN Cleveland – is a commercial sports radio station licensed to Cleveland, Ohio, serving Greater Cleveland. Owned by Good Karma Sports, WKNR is the Cleveland affiliate for ESPN Radio and the AM flagship station for the Cleveland Browns Radio Network; the Cleveland affiliate for the Ohio State Sports Network, and the radio home of Je'Rod Cherry and Tony Grossi. The WKNR studios are currently located in the East Bank of The Flats in Downtown Cleveland, while the transmitter resides in the Cleveland suburb of North Royalton. WKNR's daytime signal can be heard as far as Mansfield, and even as far as Newark and Zanesville. In addition to a standard analog transmission, WKNR is available online.

WKNR originated as WLBV in Mansfield in 1926. After adopting the WJW call letters in 1929, the station relocated twice, first to Akron in 1932 and again to Cleveland in 1943. During the early 1950s, disc jockey Alan Freed began to popularize the term "rock and roll" as a name for the music genre both through his late-night radio show, and by what is often considered the first major rock and roll concert: the WJW-sponsored Moondog Coronation Ball. WJW also served as an early home for Dorothy Fuldheim, Soupy Sales, and Casey Kasem.

Under Storer Broadcasting ownership from 1952 to 1977, WJW sported a beautiful music format throughout the 1960s. After Art Modell's Lake Erie Broadcasting purchased WJW, the format transitioned into middle of the road in 1978, and again to talk radio in 1982. Relaunched as WRMR in 1985, the station became best known as an adult standards outlet from 1988 to 2001 featuring Bill Randle.

A complex series of asset swaps resulted in the transfer of WKNR's all-sports format and call sign from 1220 AM to 850 AM on July 3, 2001. Since 2007, WKNR has been under the ownership of Craig Karmazin's Good Karma Brands (now Good Karma Sports as of August 2026).

== WLBV (1926–1929) ==
=== Mansfield origin ===
What is today known as WKNR launched at midnight on December 31, 1926, from the Southern Hotel in Mansfield, Ohio, under the WLBV call sign. Founded by John F. Weimer and D.A. Snick, WLBV was the first radio station to operate in Mansfield, transmitting with 50 watts on 1300 kHz. Weimer had been fascinated with electronics since the age of 7 when growing up in Tuscarawas County, and after his family moved to Mansfield, established his first wireless station in 1911 and progressed to aural transmissions by 1913. Helping run a family butcher shop after his father's death, Weimer ceasing operations of those stations during World War I, but resumed hobbyist work after the war. The Southern Hotel studios were temporary, by March 1, 1927, WLBV relocated to the nearby Chamber of Commerce building. The station quickly progressed under Weimer's watch, which also saw a frequency shift to 1450 kHz on May 1, 1927. Initially criticized for a "tin-pan" air sound, the fidelity improved near the end of 1927 and earned the praise of Westinghouse Broadcasting executives as "an unusual station" for such a small city. One notable program on the station was presented with inmates of the Mansfield Reformatory, with armed guards surrounding the studios.

WLBV briefly found itself in jeopardy after Weimer struggled to raise money to renew its audio performance rights license with the Composers, Authors and Publishers Association (today's ASCAP) at the end of March 1928, prompting the station to announce a forthcoming closedown, but found enough financial support from area businesses to remain operational. The station initially operated without a chain broadcasting link, but was admitted into the Federated Broadcasting System upon that network's 1929 launch. Listener reception for WLBV was overwhelmingly positive, with thousands of complementary letters by April 1928 and no complaints. The station received phone calls from New York City, Philadelphia, Washington, D.C. and Chicago, and one long-distance reception report as far west as Des Moines. A secondary studio was also constructed at the Charles M. Zitzer music store by January 1929.

== WJW (1929–1985) ==
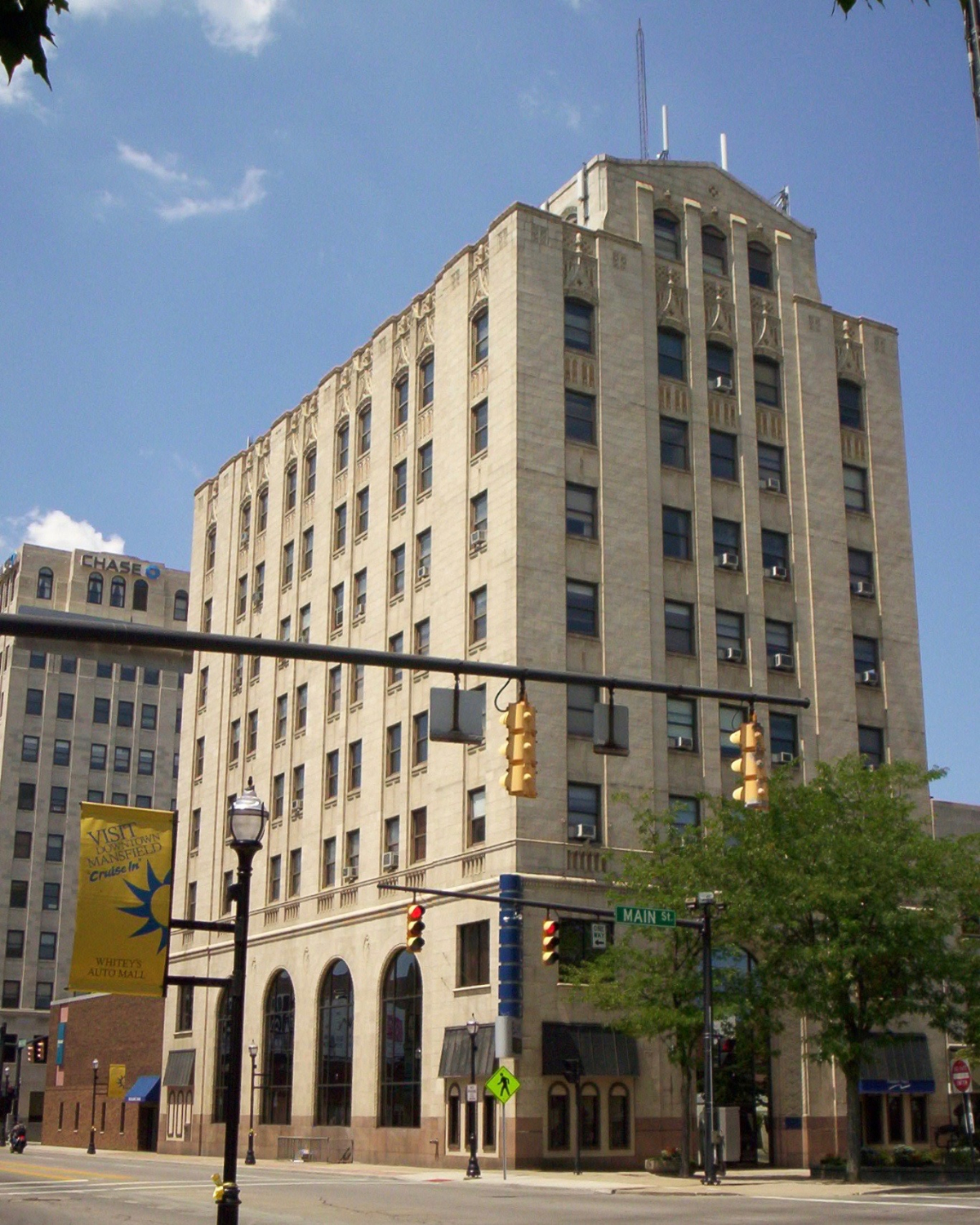
The Richland Trust Building in downtown Mansfield, an early home for WJW

The Federal Radio Commission (FRC) General Order 40 saw WLBV reassigned again to 1210 kHz on November 11, 1928, with a power increase to 100 watts by December 14. In order to better identify with Mansfield, WLBV management applied for a call sign change request to WMO, which was granted by the FRC on May 14, 1929. Two days later, the FRC abruptly changed the station's calls again to WJW after a clerical error by the agency failed to account for callsign WMO's existing usage on another station, the rename to WJW was made retroactive to May 9. Despite the random selection by the FCC, the WJW calls also ended up reflecting John Weimer's initials.

Aided by income from sponsored programming, WJW moved their facilities once again to the ninth floor of the Richland Trust Building when it was completed on November 2, 1929, one week after Black Monday occurred. Two large radio towers were erected on top of the building, visible for several miles and was thought to the highest point in Ohio for a transmitter; at the time of the move, WJW operated for one hour in late mornings and during the early evenings, but Weimer promised an expanded broadcast lineup.

=== Move to Akron ===
John F. Weimer—d/b/a the Mansfield Broadcasting Association—filed a request with the FRC on February 12, 1932, to relocate WJW to Akron maintaining the same frequency and power output. In testimony before FRC examiner R. H. Hyde, the operators for both Zanesville's WALR and Columbus's WSEN supported the move as it would reduce interference for their stations, while Weimer promised to have multiple Akron civic organizations on WJW and emphasized the benefits of moving to a larger city (Akron's 1930 population was 300,000 compared to Mansfield's 30,000). WADC was Akron's lone radio station licensed to serve the city, and had been as such after WFJC was consolidated with a Springfield station to form WGAR on December 15, 1930, and moved out of Akron to sign on in Cleveland. Examiner Hyde recommended denying the application, citing a lack of evidence to support another Akron radio station, but the FRC reversed his findings and gave full approval on September 8, 1930.

After a "swan song" final broadcast from Mansfield on October 5, 1932, WJW's transmitter was dismantled and transported to Akron for an October 15 sign-on; all on- and off-air personnel were retained. A Mansfield News piece on the station after the move noted Mansfield listeners were now unable to receive WJW due to interference from WSEN. Still broadcasting at 1210 kHz with 100 watts, WJW's transmitter and studios were located at 41 South High Street in downtown Akron. Weimer incorporated WJW on January 31, 1933, becoming the station's president. Among the stakeholders for WJW, Inc. were William F. Jones, who founded WADC in 1925 and owned WFJC from 1927 until 1930, while Weimer held a 20 percent stake. Sam L. Townsend, a former manager for WFJC, also assumed the same position at WJW.

Along with three associates, Weimer founded the "WMAN Broadcasting Company" in early 1935 and applied to the Federal Communications Commission (FCC) for a replacement station in Mansfield. During the hearings, Weimer disclosed that he held stock in WALR and a gold mine, and claimed to have no immediate cash on hand, having relied on family to provide the money for his investments. The FCC rejected the application on October 23, 1935, citing uncertainty with the group's financial viability in addition to objections raised by Fort Wayne's WGL.

Monetary issues revealed themselves again when WJW joined WADC in objecting to a 1937 application by S. Bernard Berk for a full-time high-fidelity radio station at 1530 kHz, claiming that Akron could not support more than two stations. During the three-year-long legal fight with Berk, WJW's legal counsel stated in a 1939 hearing that the station operated at a loss since 1936, and the majority of any profits went directly to employee salaries. A second attempt at a new Mansfield station did succeed when the FCC awarded a license for WMAN on June 7, 1939, with Weimer as secretary-treasurer and chief engineer. Prior to WMAN's sign-on, Weimer was involved in a July 5, 1939, vehicular collision that killed a 15-year-old pedestrian; Weimer was ultimately ordered to pay $3,500 to the victim's estate.

While WJW had operated as an independent for most of their early existence, the station finally obtained an affiliation with the Transcontinental Broadcasting System (TBS), which had a proposed launch date of January 1, 1940. Despite WJW scheduling a local "salute" to TBS and having rearranged local shows to accommodate the new chain, TBS's launch was abruptly canceled with one hour's notice after their two largest sponsors "repudiated" all programming contracts. William M. O'Neil, Jr. purchased a majority of shares in WJW on June 25, 1940 for $41,500 and assumed control on July 1. This transaction occurred after Weimer and Townsend divested their shares while Jones sold his shares directly to O'Neil, with one of the two other remaining shareholders being M. F. Rubin, who also held a stake in WMAN. O'Neil was the son of William F. O'Neil, president of Akron-based General Tire and Rubber Co.—which also entered broadcasting in 1943 with the purchase of a station group in New England—but operated WJW independently from the tire manufacturer. Weimer was forced to divest his WMAN shares in 1942 after admitting on a witness stand to falsifying financial statements submitted to the FCC that helped secure that station's license. Despite helping build and sign-on Canton's WCMW in 1946, Weimer never worked in broadcast radio again.

=== Move to Cleveland ===
One of William M. O'Neill's first moves as WJW's new owner was to link the station up with the Mutual Broadcasting System on September 22, 1940, bringing that network's programming to Akron for the first time. Coupled with S. Bernard Berk signing on WAKR as an NBC Blue outlet the following month and WADC's extant Columbia affiliation, WJW's Mutual link gave Akron three radio network affiliates at the end of 1940 after beginning the year with only one. Of particular note was Mutual's array of live music and sports, including the World Series; Mutual's nightly dance music program extended WJW's broadcast day to 1 a.m. nightly. Despite being an independent, WJW previously fed their coverage of the All-American Soap Box Derby nationally over Mutual in 1939 and 1940, and did so again on August 16, 1941. The station also helped celebrate Barberton's golden jubilee on June 29–30, 1941, by carrying much of the outdoor festivities live. WJW and the United States Navy originated a live remote broadcast from Goodyear's K-3 blimp during a flight over the region on September 11, 1941, relaying it over Mutual.

WJW changed its frequency on March 29, 1941, with implementation of the North American Regional Broadcasting Agreement (NARBA), moving to 1240 kHz while retaining 250 watt output. O'Neil filed paperwork in late August 1941 proposing that WJW move to 850 kHz with 5,000 watts fulltime, while having to share nighttime skywave with Boston's WHDH and Denver's KOA. The FCC gave O'Neil the construction permit on January 21, 1942, but construction of a new transmitter site in Botzum was delayed due to challenges procuring materials for construction and finding an engineer. Meanwhile, WHK's switch from NBC Blue to Mutual in the fall of 1942 left Cleveland without a Blue affiliate, prompting O'Neil to requesting an alteration to the construction permit allowing WJW's operations to move to Cleveland. The proposal centered on WJW becoming that market's new Blue station, with studios at the NBC Building that housed NBC-owned WTAM and a new transmitter site in Cuyahoga County. The 5,000 watt transmitter WJW had set up at Botzum but never activated was simply transported up to North Royalton.

While the FCC approved the proposal on December 4, 1942, O'Neil requested another modification on June 23, 1943, for WJW to remain in Akron using the current facilities under a new licensee name "The Akron Broadcasting Company", concurrent with the new Cleveland station signing on. Buckeye Broadcasting Co. would then purchase the 1240 kHz license, renamed WAJV, with the WJW name affixed to the new 850 kHz facilities. This request was denied after WGAR successfully petitioned for a frequency move of their own to 1220 kHz, in effect rendering WJW's 1240 kHz facilities unusable. WJW continued operating in Akron until the move to Cleveland at 2:30 p.m. on November 14, 1943, following a special celebratory program; an advance station schedule supplied by WJW to the Beacon Journal ended with, "SORRY GONE TO CLEVELAND." The first Blue program to air following the move was General Tire-sponsored Thanks to America, with WJW becoming a primary Blue affiliate the following day. The majority of staff moved up from Akron to Cleveland; announcer Marvin Cade signed on the station and was the evening news announcer. Competing station WGAR collaborated with WJW for a special broadcast on both stations the day of the move, WGAR also took out advertisements in Cleveland's three daily newspapers "welcoming" the station into Cleveland.

With facilities in the Guardian Building (now the National City–East 6th Building at 619 Euclid), WJW became Cleveland's fifth radio station after co-owned WHK and WCLE, WTAM and WGAR; the number of stations would be reduced back to four in May 1945 when WCLE moved their station operations to Akron as WHKK. To help recruit and develop on-air talent, O'Neil launched an agency in early 1945 dubbed "The WJW Bureau", with radio actor Gene Carroll as president. "Broadcast Melodies" was another subsidiary launched in 1946 to provide background music for area businesses to help boost morale and improve productivity, holding a local franchise for the World Broadcasting System's transcription library. WJW also added broadcast rights to Cleveland Rams NFL football for the 1945 season; announced by Earl Harper, it was the last season played prior to the Rams' relocation to Los Angeles. Harper was succeeded by Jimmy Dudley in late 1946 as the station's lead sportscaster.

The station began airing daily commentaries by Dorothy Fuldheim as part of their Newspaper of the Air program in June 1944. In addition, Fuldheim hosted Young America Thinks, a weekly public affairs program produced with the Cleveland Board of Education. WJW hired Fuldheim on her reputation as a public speaker but her broadcast experience previously included programs over WTAM and the NBC Red Network as the first female news analyst in network radio. In addition, WJW assigned Fuldheim to attend the San Francisco Conference that established the United Nations. Fuldheim's tenure at WJW ended when Scripps-Howard hired her for WEWS-FM (102.1) and, in turn, WEWS-TV upon their December 17, 1947, sign-on as the first female news anchor in American television.

=== Cleveland Indians baseball ===
WJW reached an agreement with the Cleveland Indians to become the team's new flagship station on February 25, 1948. WJW replaced WGAR, which had been in the role since team owner Bill Veeck allowed it and three other stations—WJW, WHK and WTAM—to broadcast the games starting on June 28, 1946. No radio station expressed interest in Indians games at the start of 1946, along with the majority of the 1945 season; WJW and WHK expressed interest in 1944 but neither station could find a sponsor. Veeck ended WGAR's three-year contract following the 1947 season after WGAR found itself unable to broadcast all the games due to CBS commitments. With this deal, WJW agreed to carry 147 of the team's 154-game schedule including both games of any doubleheaders live on-site, eschewing in-studio recreations of road games via telegraphy.

Also established was a 15-station statewide radio network sponsored by Standard Brewing, led by FM adjunct WJW-FM (104.1) which was slated to sign on in April. The network soon offered additional programming outside of game coverage billed as The Standard Network, also with WJW-FM as flagship. Longtime broadcaster Jack Graney was paired with Jimmy Dudley; Dudley also began hosting a nightly sports program over WJW titled Sports Page which was carried over Standard Network affiliates.

The 1948 season, however, became immediately problematic. WJW arranged ABC commitments to broadcast games starting at 3 p.m., but the Indians moved the start times to 2 p.m. and failed to notify station management in time, resulting in WJW-FM broadcasting games in their entirety and WJW joining them in progress. Listeners in Akron unable to receive WJW-FM had to tune in to either WCMW or Wooster's WWST, neither of which were easily accessible in Akron proper. The team was repeatedly criticized for the WJW deal, with some estimates showing only 10,000 FM receivers were in use in Northern Ohio, even as more FM radio sets were reputedly sold in Cleveland than in any other market in the country.

As radio network programming, particularly in the daytime, consisted of sponsored shows, WJW had to accommodate those shows along with the Standard Brewing-sponsored Indians games. Multiple games were scheduled only on WJW-FM, but one previously unscheduled Indians-Yankees game aired on WJW due to a rain delay. One Cleveland Press editorial on September 4, 1948, called the situation "disgraceful" considering the team's pennant run, and urged WJW to carry all the games in their entirety in hopes of "washing out... the large amount of ill-feeling which WJW has built up for itself this summer by its baseball broadcasting undependability". The radio network did grow in size as the pennant race heated up, expanding to 26 affiliates by September. Standard's Erin Brew beer—popular in the city's Irish community—saw a substantial increase in sales thanks to Dudley's in-game advertising.

The National A.A.U. swim meet of three week ends ago was an artistic success but a financial fizzle which lost $4,700. The Indians were away from home when the meet was staged at (the) Cuyahoga Falls pool, but even some of the so-called most interested swim fans could not be lured to the pool, lest they miss a baseball play as detailed by Jack Graney and Jimmy Dudley.

— Jim Schlemmer

Major League Baseball's radio contract with Mutual gave that network exclusive coverage of the 1948 World Series, which the Indians advanced to after a tie-breaker game against the Boston Red Sox. Mutual's play-by-play was typically composed with one announcer from each league champion but Graney was ineligible as he played for the team prior to entering broadcasting, violating American League policy, while Dudley was not chosen because of his relative inexperience. MLB commissioner Happy Chandler consequently paired Boston Braves announcer Jim Britt with Yankees announcer Mel Allen, playing up their experience as World Series broadcasters. Veeck was furious at the slight, calling the selection "patently unfair" after Dudley and Graney's regular-season efforts representing the team. Veeck's anger was justified. Graney and Dudley's narration of the pennant run had captivated the region, with all other forms of entertainment—even the Cleveland Browns—suffering steep declines in attention and revenue; one Akron business firm canceled their long-running radio program after finding out their customers were listening to the games on WJW instead. Along with WHK and WHKK, Mutual's Gillette-sponsored coverage boasted over 500 affiliates across the country, plus simulcasts over Armed Forces Radio and the CBC in Canada.

Despite being on printed radio schedules, WHK did not air Mutual's coverage of the tie-breaker game after Veeck refused to grant the station permission; the game was offered to Mutual for free at the recommendation of Red Sox owner Tom Yawkey. Locally, WJW carried the playoff game with Graney and Dudley. Prior to game three of the series at Cleveland Municipal Stadium, Veeck directed Mutual engineers to a press box normally used for football games and was unusable for baseball, prompting Mutual and Gilette to threaten a boycott, angering Happy Chandler. The impasse between Veeck, Chandler, Mutual and Gillette was resolved 15 minutes prior to the first pitch when WJW owner William M. O'Neil, Jr. urged Veeck to let Mutual broadcast in the normal press box. At Veeck's insistence, O'Neil issued a telegram requesting that flagship stations for teams participating in the World Series matches be permitted to carry Mutual's play-by-play and that one announcer from each team had to be selected, which became MLB policy the following year.

Unlike the previous season, WJW was able to resolve ABC network commitments for the 1949 season, allowing the station to carry all games in full. The station's relationship with the Indians ended in 1950 when newly established WERE (1300 AM) took over as team flagship, with Standard Brewing retaining sponsorship. One of the affiliates from the WJW-led network, Sandusky's WLEC, has remained an affiliate with all subsequent iterations of the network up to the present day.

=== Alan Freed and "rock and roll" ===
Alan was a cocky kid; a real go-getter. Leo saw his talent and he figured Alan, with some guidance, could make it big in Cleveland.

— Betty Mintz, Leo Mintz's widow, recalling Leo's impression of Alan Freed

One of WJW's most influential personalities was a young disc jockey named Alan Freed. Freed had already achieved fame at WAKR hosting a daytime music program along with the nightly Wax Works and Request Review, but his February 1950 departure for WADC prompted a lawsuit by WAKR ownership to enforce a one-year non-compete clause. Freed repeatedly lost in court and the non-compete—which extended for a radius of 75 miles (121 km) from Akron—barred him from radio work for a full calendar year, although he was able to host an afternoon program on WXEL (channel 9). The non-compete expired on February 11, 1951, allowing Freed to join WADC for the midnight program Dreamville, in a more subdued presentation than his "Ol' Knucklehead" persona at WAKR. The expenses incurred by the year-long legal fight drove Freed to file for bankruptcy on May 9, 1951.

At the same time, record shop owner Leo Mintz was sponsoring a late-night program of classical music on WJW. Mintz's Record Rendezvous had acquired a reputation in the music industry for selling rhythm and blues music and allowing customers to play records prior to purchase, and had heavily advertised on radio stations. After listening to airchecks of Freed's past work after he inquired about job opportunities in Cleveland, Mintz scrapped the classical program and picked Freed to host a new show playing current R&B recordings personally selected by Mintz. Freed adopted the nickname "The King of the Moondoggers" purportedly after listening to Louis "Moondog" Hardin's 1947 "Moondog Symphony", using that piece as his program's theme song. Largely inspired by WLAC's nighttime programming, Mintz set up The Moondog House Party to feature R&B recordings by black artists instead of covers by white artists, and doing so for a predominantly white audience. Freed initially objected to this, considering those recordings as race records, but soon conceded to Mintz's insistence. While Freed started using "rock and roll" on-air to describe the music, Mintz conceived of the phrase in 1948 while watching customers seemingly "rocking and rolling" into Record Rendezvous instead of just walking in, and suggested the phrase to Freed.

If anyone... had told us that some 20 or 25,000 people would try to get into a dance—I suppose you would have been just like me. You would have laughed and said they were crazy.

— Alan Freed, in an on-air apology the night after the Moondog Coronation Ball

As Freed's popularity grew, he and Mintz decided to organize live events that showcased some of the musicians on The Moondog House Party. With assistance from concert promoter Lew Platt, the first such event—the Moondog Coronation Ball—was booked for March 21, 1952, at the Cleveland Arena, with Paul Williams, Tiny Grimes, The Dominoes, Varetta Dillard and Danny Cobb among the featured performers, with a ticket price of $1.50. While the Arena normally could host 15,000 people, both the Cleveland Division of Fire and Division of Police started receiving warnings about the event potentially being significantly oversold. Mintz had intended for a second concert due to overwhelming ticket sales, but a printing error forgot to include the concert date, which was further exacerbated by counterfeit tickets. Mintz and Platt had hired 25 security guards for the Arena's entrance, but the overflow crowd of approximately 6,000 people crashed the gate at 9:30 p.m. and charged into the Arena, prompting 40 policemen and 30 fireman to be called in. Whiskey bottles were smashed on the Arena floor, four panel doors were destroyed, and two people were stabbed. Compounding matters was the shock of black people in the audience seeing Alan Freed for the first time in person, resulting in an uproar.

Fire officials and riot police entered the Arena and ended the event after only one song was played, but the song was inaudible due to the large crowd noise of 25,000 attendees. Mintz and his wife were in Florida that night; when notified about the riot, Mintz immediately flew back to Cleveland and rode a taxi to the arena. Witnessing the large group of people walking around outside the arena, and seeing the fire department hosing rioters inside the arena, Mintz directed the cab driver to take him back to the airport. Freed was located by officials in a radio booth, with the city's fire chief threatening to arrest him on deliberately overselling the event. The next night, Freed apologized on-air for the melee, even admitting that he could not fathom a music event having such a massive attendance. An Associated Press wire story summed up the event as being "such a success (that) it failed". In a more contemporary analysis, Plain Dealer music critic John Soeder considered it the "Big Bang of rock 'n' roll" and is now generally recognized within popular culture as the first rock concert.

Freed signed a contract with New York City's WINS in July 1954 in what was one of the largest talent contracts for an air personality, including an annual $75,000 salary and a syndication deal. While this necessitated his departure from WJW on August 14, 1954, the station was one of nine that agreed to carry his syndicated show in the same timeslot. Prior to the deal, a similarly-titled "Moondog Coronation Ball" at the Newark Armory on May 8, 1954, staged by WNJR attracted a crowd of 20,000, filling the Armory to capacity and preventing those in attendance from being able to dance. The move to New York would cost Freed the "Moondog" nickname when Louis Hardin sued for $100,000 in damages and copyright infringement, and the judge enjoined Freed. Freed's involvement in the genesis of "rock and roll" has largely taken precedence over Mintz's behind-the-scenes role, particularly after the Rock and Roll Hall of Fame committed to a location in Cleveland. Freed was a member of the Rock Hall's initial induction class, while Mintz is a mention within the museum's Freed exhibit.

=== Pete Myers and Casey Kasem ===
From May 1951 to early 1953, WJW was home to a disc jockey called Soupy Hines, later known as Soupy Sales. O'Neil sold WJW and WJW-FM to Storer Broadcasting on November 17, 1954. Storer also purchased television station WXEL and changed the call letters to WJW-TV. Within two years, radio and television operations were consolidated at new studios at 1630 Euclid Avenue, near Playhouse Square, in a remodeled Georgian building that formerly housed the Esquire Theater. WJW dropped its ABC Radio Network affiliation at the end of 1957 and became an independent station, although the station later had a brief affiliation with NBC. By 1959, WJW broadcast with 10,000 watts daytime and 5,000 watts at night.

Pete "Mad Daddy" Myers had a short but meteoric stint at WJW. Myers made his debut on January 20, 1958, joining the station from Akron's WHKK, where he had been at since October 22, 1956. Myers' acting abilities—having trained at the Royal Academy of Dramatic Art in London, attempted work as a character actor in New York City and participated in community theater—helped foster the adoption of his "Mad Daddy" persona, which partially came out of desperation to create a "career-making splash". Speaking in rhyme and with hipster-like lyricism, Myers popularized phrases "wavy gravy", "mello jello" and "zoomeratin'", with the bulk of his witticisms all improvised. Myers remained at WJW until May 13, 1958, when he abruptly resigned to join Metromedia's WHK for double the salary he had at WJW but failed to give a 90-day notice for his departure, resulting in enforcement of a non-compete clause in his contract. A publicity stunt engineered by Myers during the interregnum involved him parachuting from a Piper Cub 2,200 feet (670 m) over Lake Erie on June 14, 1958, and composing a poem on his way down.

Having lost Freed and Myers successively, WJW ultimately turned to Casey Kasem for the evening shift as 1959 began. Kasem identified himself as "Casey at the Mike" owing to varied misspellings of his name in both contemporary news accounts and station promos. Within three months, Kasem reached second place behind WHK in ratings surveys on weeknights and number one on Saturday nights, entering the market "with a vengeance" against Top 40 stations WHK and KYW. Like Myers and Freed before him, Kasem featured R&B recordings in a "high-energy rock" style, with his "wild-tracking" distinguishing himself from WJW's daytime pop-oriented fare that featured Perry Como and The McGuire Sisters as core artists. Converstly, the fourth hour was more laidback with his news reader as a co-host. In addition to his WJW work, Kasem also hosted the dance show Cleveland Bandstand over WJW-TV.

=== Beautiful music format ===
On May 1, 1960, WJW dropped the majority of their personality-based programming for "good music", a beautiful music presentation that featured music played uninterrupted in stretches ranging from 12 to 20 minutes, commercials played in clusters, and a limit to commercials played per hour. WJW was the first station in the entire Storer chain to adopt a beautiful music format, eventually joined by Miami's WGBS and Los Angeles's KGBS, with Storer's national radio program manager Grady Edney personally overseeing the launch in Cleveland. Casey Kasem attributed the switch directly to the payola scandal and left WJW for Buffalo's WBNY, but remained in contact with friends in the Cleveland area. NBC Radio programming was retained on WJW until 1962, when the affiliation moved to WGAR and WJW became independent again. Despite the "beautiful music" descriptor that was even prevalent on station letterhead as late as 1972, management emphasized WJW was a "modern MOR station heavy on personality."

Leading the station throughout much of this era was morning host Ed Fisher. A native of Butler, Fisher started his radio career at WMAN while also working in the News Journal mailing room, spending time at stations in Zanesville and Moline, Illinois before joining WJW in 1962. In addition to his WJW work, Fisher also hosted WJW-TV's version of The Bozo Show. Presiding over the Grouch Club morning show, Fisher added lighthearted humor and wit to the music selections, punctuated by his daily catchphrase "take good care of the babies". As WJW had moved their studios to their transmitter site in North Royalton, Fisher soon dubbed the suburb "High on a Friendly Hill". Nicknamed "The Captain", Carl Reese joined WJW in 1964 after prior work at WERE and WHK, becoming a fixture at the station for 18 years with a genial, friendly on-air style. Along with Fisher and Reese, personalities heard on WJW during this era included Ted Lux and David Mark. In 1968, Storer changed WJW-FM's call letters to WCJW, and launched a "countrypolitian" country music format featuring WJW's air talent as announcers via voice-tracking. WJW celebrated their 25th anniversary as a Cleveland station on November 14, 1968, by interspersing songs from 1943 into the general playlist.

WJW and Top 40-formatted WIXY entered 1970 as the dominant AM stations in the Cleveland market, while WJW commanded 25% of all revenue in the Cleveland market between 1965 and 1970. Storer had estimated that WJW's audience resided in the suburbs and were more affluent in comparison to other stations. WJW enjoyed a disproportionately large audience of people aged 18 and older in ratings surveys, even as their target demo was supposed to be 35–plus; conversely, WIXY attracted an equally disproportionate audience of people 35 and older. This disparity was caused by considerable overlap between WJW and WIXY's playlist, with WJW having played eleven songs that were listed on WIXY's weekly music survey at the end of 1970, motivating Jack G. Thayer to relaunch WGAR with an adult contemporary format in September 1970. WJW's penchant for attracting a contemporary audience despite the MOR format persisted into 1973, with then-program director Bob West implementing a color-coded playlist driven by current songs picked by air talent enthusiasm, oldies and lesser-known songs by established artists. West also began adding international recordings into the playlist, including songs recorded in Poland, China, Germany and Africa, believing that they did not sound out of place with WJW's regular format.

While Ed Fisher continued to attract strong ratings in morning drive, WGAR, along with FM beautiful music stations, slowly began to erode WJW's overall standing in the market. One of those stations happened to be the former WCJW, which Storer sold along with Philadelphia's WPNA to SJR in April 1971 for a combined $1.4 million and was relaunched as WQAL one month later. The sale was part of a dispersal of Storer's FM properties over the previous year, with their Los Angeles FM being the only one left. In the February 1971 Pulse ratings survey, WDOK was the only FM station to place among the top 10 stations in ratings surveys; by March 1974, WQAL and WDOK were ranked No. 2 and No. 3 overall behind talk-formatted WERE, with WGCL-FM and WMMS also charting, but Ed Fisher still placed at second in morning drive. Carl Reese had been offered positions at FM stations, but declined them all, citing a personal lack of interest in FM formats. WJW experimented in afternoons starting in 1973 with a music-and-talk show fronted by Ronn Owens, but his show ended after WJW committed to a "more music" presentation that emphasized "adult music" over MOR. WIXY, the market's last remaining AM Top 40 outlet, also converted to adult contemporary as WMGC in 1976; at the same time, WJW began to operate at a loss financially.

=== Shift to talk radio ===
Early 1980s logo as WJW

Storer Broadcasting sold WJW radio in early September 1976 to Lake Erie Broadcasting for $2.5 million. Lake Erie Broadcasting was headed primarily by Cleveland Browns owners Art Modell and Al Lerner, with WJW general manager Richard Bremkamp and WEWS sportscaster Gib Shanley holding minority stakes. The sale was made after Storer began to express reservations about radio ownership but already owned the maximum amount of television stations under existing FCC regulations. Moreover, Storer president Peter Storer noted that the $2.5 million representing "a significant profit" for the company, especially since WJW was now losing money. Lake Erie prevailed in a bidding war against Booth American Broadcasting for WJW, which had even put their existing AM property WABQ up for sale in the process. Storer retained WJW-TV, whose calls were changed to WJKW the following April 22, 1977, as Lake Erie was granted full legal rights to the WJW call sign. The deal was consummated in July 1977, and Bremkamp was elevated to station president at the start of 1978.

WJW's format shifted to middle of the road (MOR) on February 6, 1978, while retaining CBS Radio News and sports programming. Richard Bremkamp, who joined WJW in 1974 as general manager after prior work at WIXY, made the move after the station participated in a large-scale survey regarding music preferences among older age demographics that spanned 12,000 participants, 60 markets and 48 states. The survey results helped Bremkamp and program director Dick Conrad move the playlist away from record store chart-driven selections when most charts were now dominated by customers 25 years old and younger, resulting in what Bremkamp called "a hodge-podge of hits". The format change also resulted in the dismissal of Ed Fisher after a 15-year run in morning drive on March 10, 1978. Fisher subsequently joined WQAL, while WJW replaced him with veteran announcer Tom Armstrong. Despite the programming changes, WJW continued to lose money on an annual basis. WJW now found itself competing with FM stations for music listeners in an environment where other AM stations were beginning to drop music entirely. The station significantly downscaled their news department in July 1980, dismissing news director Jim Hale and two reporters, but kept the CBS Radio newscasts in place.

I've never had a bankruptcy in my life and I wasn't going to start now. It was a matter of whether I wanted to stay in it anymore. I just folded, liquidated. We paid everyone off.

— Art Modell, principal owner of WJW, on the closure of American Metal Forming Co. in 1982

Compounding matters was a series of questionable investments made by Lake Erie principal Art Modell. Modell had previously purchased vacuum manufacturer Premier Electric in 1972 and stamper American Metal Forming Co. in 1977, but both companies closed in 1979 and 1982, respectively; American Metal Forming was shuttered after Modell refused to enter bankruptcy and paid off all debts instead. A group led by Modell purchased the Sheraton-Cleveland Hotel for $18 million in 1977, but Modell had to take out an additional $2 million loan against his holding company for Cleveland Stadium after two other investors had withdrawn. Rumors emerged in 1981 that Modell was under possible financial pressure to sell off WJW. Gib Shanley's stake in Lake Erie was bought out in March 1982, followed by Bremkamp's stake in May 1982, with Modell and Al Lerner as the remaining investors. Robert Gries, a minority owner of the Browns since their 1946 establishment, later claimed in court that Modell faced "possible financial ruin" in the spring of 1982 and had been in debt since purchasing majority control of the team in 1961.

The MOR format was abandoned entirely in favor of talk radio on July 6, 1982. In a transitional process that began at the end of May 1982, news director Merle Pollis was promoted to program director and added a late-morning talk show, while WGAR news director John O'Day took over Pollis' prior position. The switch put WJW in direct competition with WERE, which despite being the lone talk station in the market, had recently dismissed multiple local hosts in favor of carrying ABC's Talkradio service. Multiple WERE hosts joined the new WJW, including Rich Barrett, psychologist Stephanie Neuman and WEWS newscaster Joel Rose. Early evenings featured strip programming ranging from law advice, health and entertainment, including a Friday sports show with Casey Coleman; overnights consisted of NBC Talknet programming. Remaining music hosts Tom Armstrong, Joe Mayer, Ronnie Barrett and Carl Reese were all dismissed while Armstrong resurfaced at adult standards-formatted WBBG as their morning host, even as he expressed reluctance over that station's tightly-programmed playlist.

WJW's ratings improved after the switch, pulling even with WERE and drawing more younger listeners in specific dayparts. The station attracted attention when they partnered with the Cleveland Police for a four-hour drug abuse awareness program on January 20, 1983, encouraging listeners to call in with tips on any illegal activities; 50 suspected drug dealers were arrested over the course of the show. Broadcasts of both Cleveland State University basketball and Cleveland Force were dropped with the format switch, along with announcer Mike Snyder, but the Force and Snyder returned to WJW in November 1983 as part of a two-station arrangement with the team and WAKR. WJW's news department remained smaller than WERE's, with only one street reporter on-staff; a retrospective review cast the news department as "ordinary" while also citing Pollis and Rose as hosts "who make a lot of noise but seldom make sense". Joel Rose left both WJW and WEWS in December 1983 to focus on his broadcast consulting firm, with Westinghouse Broadcasting as a main client. While he initially found himself unable to keep the WJW show with the consulting arrangements, Rose returned to WJW as a fill-in host by April 1984, and eventually resumed full-time work.

=== Litigation and sale ===
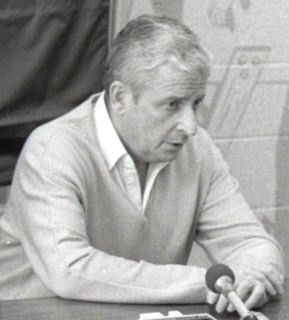
Former Browns owner Art Modell, who also owned WJW via parent company Lake Erie Broadcasting

WHK's longstanding radio contract for Browns games was set to expire at the end of the 1983 season, and Lake Erie made a substantial bid that included the team taking partial ownership of the station. While Browns executive vice president James Bailey claimed WJW's bid was the best the team had received, Robert Gries sued Modell on charges of anti-competitive practices on December 15, 1983. This lawsuit was one of multiple Gries filed against Modell and the team during the 1980s, but was dismissed in court. WHK had the right to equal WJW's offer for the 1984 season, which it did the following February. The Browns approved another offer by Lake Erie for the radio rights on February 18, 1985, but rumors quickly emerged about Lake Erie purchasing WWWE and WDOK from Gannett, which occurred later in the month via a $9.5 million deal. This purchase required the sale of WJW due to existing FCC regulations, while Modell rejected speculation he and Al Lerner did not have enough money to consummate the deals. WQAL owner WIN Communications, which was controlled by former Browns player Thom Darden, initially expressed interest in purchasing WJW as well.

Lake Erie ultimately sold WJW to WLTF owner Booth American for $2.1 million on February 28, 1985. Having successfully sold off WABQ in 1980, Booth desired a full-time AM station to complement WLTF and to help further compete for additional national advertising revenue. Lake Erie elected to keep the WWWE call sign but "move" WJW's talk format onto WWWE, and Booth planned to relaunch WJW outright as WRMR. The majority of WJW air talent and management—including general manager Art Caruso—were reassigned to WWWE, which dismissed announcers Jack Reynolds, Fig Newton and Bruce Drennan and nine other staffers, while WWWE program director Ray Marshall assumed the same position at WRMR. Lake Erie transferred the Browns rights to WWWE; Caruso and O'Day were tasked with hiring new announcers for the Browns games on WWWE while still operating WJW. WWWE retained Cleveland Indians and Cavaliers play-by-play along with Pete Franklin's Sportsline, placing the radio rights for all three Cleveland pro sports teams on the same radio station for the first time.

For the last week prior to the change, WJW aired promos for both the talk format's "new home" on WWWE, and for WRMR's forthcoming launch. Marvin Cade "signed off" WJW for the final time before the call sign change at 11:00 a.m. on June 11, 1985, followed by Cleveland mayor George Voinovich pressing a ceremonial switch that completed WWWE's flip to WJW's prior talk format. Cade's announcement also gave him the distinction of being both the first and last voice heard on WJW radio during its existence in Cleveland. Newspaper reports recognized the transaction as WJW having "a new location on the radio dial" or that "WWWE... became, in (essence), WJW", while in reality, WJW simply changed call letters to WRMR and changed format from talk to MOR. Storer filed paperwork with the FCC to change WJKW's call sign back to WJW-TV as soon as the sale of WJW was complete, a request made in part "for old times sake". Despite having been known as WJKW for eight years, the TV station was still frequently referred to by viewers as "WJW". While the FCC no longer issues three-letter call signs, they allowed the change to take place via a waiver on September 16, 1985, albeit at a slower pace than channel 8 management had expected, delaying a marketing campaign related to the new name.

== WRMR (1985–2001) ==
=== Shift to big band format ===
Station logo as WRMR; also includes the Music of Your Life logo

WRMR's MOR format boasted an airstaff of multiple Cleveland broadcast veterans at launch. In addition to programming duties, Ray Marshall hosted afternoons and was joined by Ted Alexander of WBBG and John E. Douglas of WHK, while WLTF program director Dave Popovich became operations manager for both stations. Transtar Radio Networks's "Formula 41" satellite service aired in the evenings and overnights. WRMR's older-sounding format was aimed at the 40–49 age group as a counterpart to WLTF's "lite rock" format, targeting listeners who did not want to hear a traditional easy-listening station. A second-story addition was built at WLTF's downtown studios. Ratings for WRMR during this period were low, typically attributed to the station's 5,000 watt signal, seen as weak by comparison to other stations but WWWE saw an immediate surge in listenership after adopting the former WJW format. An AM stereo converter was installed on the WRMR transmitter upon the station's debut, with Booth executive Gordon Stenback having been a major proponent of the technology. WRMR became the second AM station in Cleveland to broadcast in stereo after WGAR, and was also joined by WAKR in Akron.

WRMR took advantage of WBBG's October 1987 abandonment of adult standards by adding a syndicated show hosted by Ray Otis for Sunday mornings which had previously been heard on WBBG. That move was a quick precursor to WRMR switching to the Music of Your Life (MOYL) full-time on January 1, 1988, headed up by former WBBG programmer Jim Davis, who also hosted the midday shift. Davis was joined by two other radio veterans, "Tall Ted" (Alfred) Hallaman and a returning Carl Reese, fixtures in the market since 1960 and 1953, respectively. The station added flagship rights to the Cleveland Cavaliers Radio Network starting with the 1988–89 season, a move made by Joe Tait, who had assumed responsibilities for Cavaliers broadcast production. The team selected WRMR due to WWWE's Indians commitments repeatedly taking priority over the Cavs, with multiple games during the team's 1988 playoff run airing on WRMR due to scheduling conflicts, prompting Tait to ask, "why are we leaving WWWE when our most important games weren't even on WWWE?"

1989 ended with a two-station exchange between Booth American and the Independent Group Ltd., which had purchased WWWE and WDOK in 1987. Announced on December 22, 1989, Booth American purchased WWWE from Independent Group—controlled by Tom Embrescia, Tom Wilson and Larry Pollock—and concurrently sold WRMR to Independent Group. Booth retained the Cavaliers radio rights and transferred them back to WWWE, while also purchasing the production rights to the Indians and Browns networks from Wilson's Sports Marketing firm. Embrescia, Wilson and Pollock retained the ability to hire Herb Score's WWWE broadcast partner for the 1990 Indians season with Booth's blessing, selecting Tom Hamilton. Consummation was delayed for several months due to obscenity charges levied against former WWWE host Gary Dee, whose firing prompted the exchange. When the deal did close on June 25, 1990, some on- and off-air personnel were reassigned between the two stations. Jim Davis and Carl Reese were retained, but Ted Hallaman was not, resulting in Reese and Davis temporarily hosting six-hour airshifts. Once referred to as "Cleveland's first radio personality", Hallaman subsequently worked at Willoughby's WELW prior to rejoining WRMR in 1994.

=== Bill Randle ===
This music is not archaic, and it has enormous validity. It's current; it has that hot sting of immediacy. This stuff is always on the cutting edge. All someone has to do is play it. That's what I do, and it's a blast.

— Bill Randle

The station added Bill Randle for afternoon drive and Sunday afternoons on August 16, 1992. Proclaimed as "the most influential DJ in America" by Time in 1955, and regarded as a "rock and roll trailblazer" in the same vein as Alan Freed, Randle was a market veteran at multiple stations since his 1949 arrival in Cleveland. Most notably, Randle was the first radio personality in the northern United States to play Elvis Presley while at both WERE and New York's WCBS in 1955, working seven days a week at both stations in the mid-1950s. Additionally dabbling as a lawyer, college professor and writer, Randle refused to adhere to a playlist upon joining WRMR and objected to the term "nostalgia", bringing a dynamism rarely seen in the adult standards format. His arrival at WRMR coincided with the sale of rights for the unfinished short film The Pied Piper of Cleveland to PolyGram Filmed Entertainment, purportedly containing footage of Elvis's October 20, 1955, concert at Brooklyn High School, his first appearance "north of the Mason–Dixon line"; after the concert, Randle predicted Elvis was "going to be the biggest star in America". Echoing his past glory as a "hitmaker", when approached by WRMR's Irish Hour host Gerry Quinn about Irish trumpeter Johnny Carroll, Randle requested a Carroll record and played it on his show to enthusiastic reception.

Ronnie Barrett also returned to 850 AM when he was hired upon the Independent Group takeover, helming big band-oriented Swinging Saturday Night, the endcap to a career which spanned a dozen stations. Wayne Mack, a radio announcer since 1931, onetime sidekick to Jack Paar at WGAR and co-founder of WDOK (1260 AM), joined WRMR in 1993 to host a Friday night ballroom dance program titled The Palace Ballroom Fantasy Show. The program itself was a revival of a similar "theatre of the mind" program Mack presided over at WDOK in the 1950s. Tom Embrescia's father, Fred Embrescia, served as WRMR's public relations director and also became a regular guest on both Randle and Reese's programs. Along with the tenured airstaff, WRMR boasted two younger announcers, Frank Macek and engineer Anthony Parker, who did weekend and fill-in duties. Plain Dealer columnist Mary Strassmeyer put Macek—who also was the station's assistant program director—on the same footing as Randle, Reese and Barrett, once complementing all four in her newspaper column "for bringing class to Cleveland radio".

The station repeatedly drew respectable ratings but was perceived as an "underperformer" because it approached older demographics less attractive to ad agencies; as a result, WRMR had less commercials than the competition, but Randle's bankruptcy law firm was a frequent advertiser. Jim Davis was credited for "opening up the format" by allowing the air talent to select their own music like Randle, making the format palatable to younger listeners but also respecting the core audience. Enjoying alternative rock and jazz as much as big bands, Randle frequently wove contemporary music from acts like Shania Twain, Jewel and *NSYNC into his airshift and was one of the first to play 13-year-old LeAnn Rimes on the air. Davis held an affinity for big bands, stating that the genre's enduring popularity into the mid-1990s was because "most if it is really good music". Despite the older demographics, WRMR overachieved in the format with twice the audience share of most standards stations and became the top-rated AM station in the Cleveland market. Davis also served as the operations director for Al Ham's MOYL satellite service concurrent with his WRMR programming duties.

Ted Hallaman took a medical leave of absence at the end of 1997 for what had turned out to be heart surgery, prompting station veteran and chief engineer Ted Alexander to fill in for him in morning drive. Prior to his return, WRMR opted to move Hallaman to afternoons and installed Randle in morning drive on April 13, 1998. Plain Dealer radio critic Roger Brown hailed the move as giving WRMR "a much-needed morning boost" with Randle's "vibrant and contemporary... feisty attitude". With the switch, the airstaff additionally boasted Carl Reese in middays, market veteran Chris Quinn in evenings, and Ronnie Barrett in overnights. The move paid off, with WRMR achieving record ratings in the 12+ demographic and placing among the top 10 adult standards stations in Arbitron Fall 1999 rankings in both AQH and cume, the only station to do so.

=== Increased power, corporate radio ===
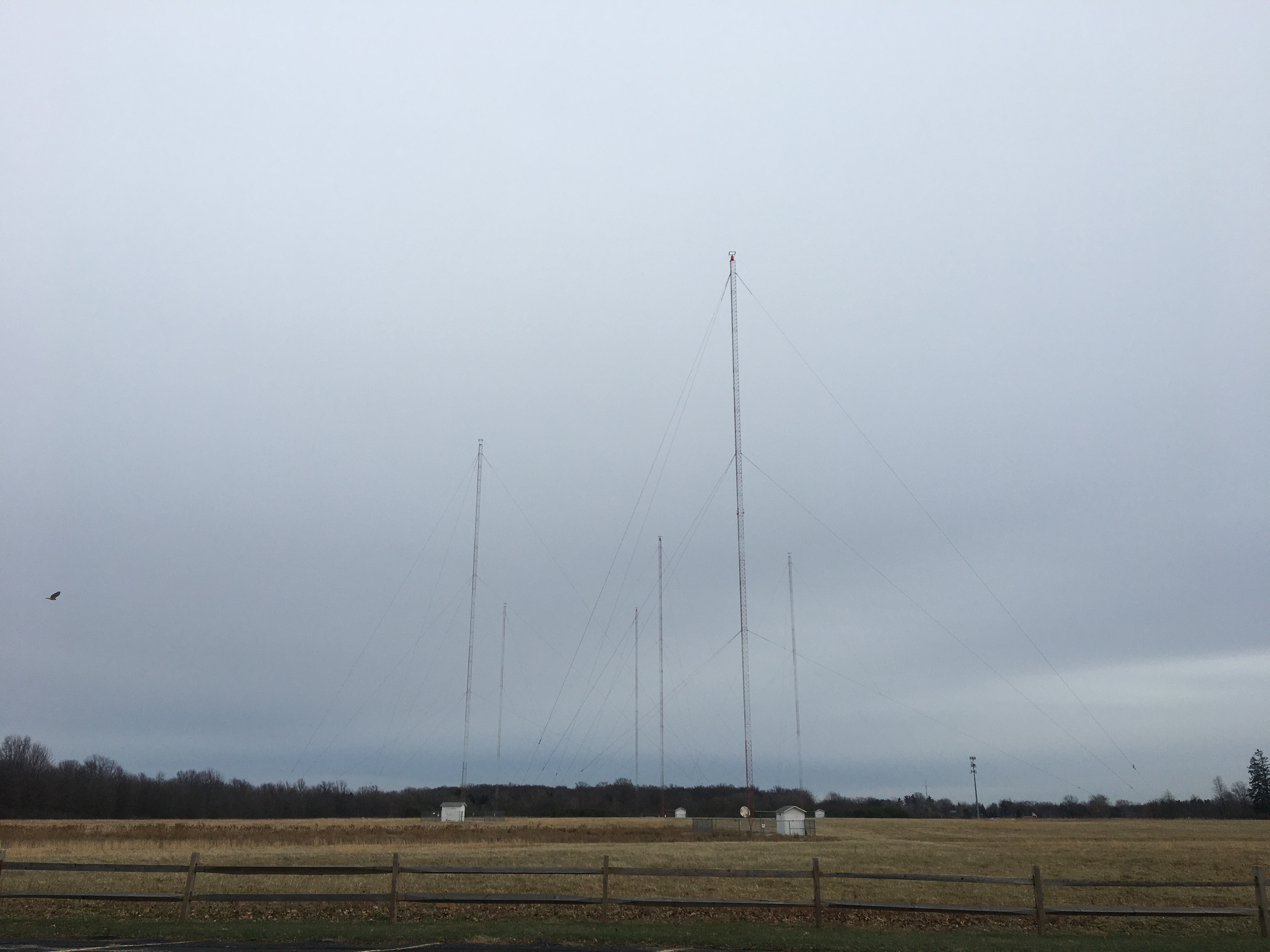
The WKNR transmitter site in North Royalton, Ohio. Activated in 1999, it replaced a previous tower array built in 1959, and has been used for broadcasting since 1943.

While WRMR operated at 10,000 watts during the day since 1959, it had been capable of a power upgrade but deferred due to logistics, costs and FCC requirements. Work began on a facility upgrade to 50,000 watts daytime upon the Independent Group takeover, with an initial proposal of a new six-tower transmitter site in Granger Township, but it failed to get local government approval after NIMBY opposition by area residents. Ultimately, WRMR rebuilt their transmitter site in North Royalton, a process that took nearly one year to complete, while also taking their auxiliary site offline; because of this, the station was off the air for nearly two days in July 1998 when the transmitter failed following a thunderstorm. Parts were sourced from St. Louis and shipped to Cleveland, while the station received thousands of phone calls from listeners. The FCC approved the upgrade on May 26, 1999, allowing WRMR to switch daytime power to 50,000 watts at noon on May 28, becoming the third AM station in the market to operate at that power level after WTAM and WKNR. WRMR's daytime signal remained weak to the southeast in order to avoid interference with Johnstown's WKGE, but now became easily receivable in Ashtabula, Youngstown, Dayton, London, Ontario, and Detroit.

The biggest change, however, occurred on August 12, 1998, when Irving-based Chancellor Media Corporation announced three concurrent transactions. Chancellor purchased WRMR and WDOK from Independent Group, along with WQAL from investment fund M.L. Media Partners and WZJM, WZAK and WJMO from Zapis Communications, all for a combined $275 million. This was, at the time, the largest deal and the "richest deal" in Cleveland radio history. The joint sale came after Jacor amassed a dominant position in the market by purchasing WTAM and WLTF in April 1997 and WKNR by August 1997 and merging into Nationwide Communications by October 1997, making it impossible for the other groups to remain competitive financially. M.L. Media Partners had sought to sell WQAL as early as April 1997, and after Independent Group and Zapis failed to close a joint $45 million purchase for WQAL, all three groups united to sell outright. The newly formed cluster would soon be joined by WKNR after Chancellor's merger with Capstar Broadcasting 15 days later; Capstar acquired WKNR from Jacor earlier in the month via a trade in order to complete Jacor's buyout of Nationwide.

Lee Zapis, whose family had owned WZAK since 1963, expressed regret on selling their properties, a feeling shared by Tom Embrescia, calling it a "very tough, emotional thing to do". Embresica admitted that Chancellor did not exactly meet their asking price, but liked their style and felt listeners would be well-served. WCLV's co-founder and president Robert Conrad mused after the flurry of purchases, "the glory days for radio in this town are over" as WCLV had become the only station left in the market with local ownership interests. Changes soon trickled down to WRMR. Evening voice Chris Quinn was dismissed and replaced with automation, with Quinn calling himself and other air talent "a budget item now". WDOK/WRMR program director Sue Wilson left to focus on freelance and her voice-over agency, her replacement was onetime general manager Joe Restifo. Ted Alexander, who built WRMR's 50,000 watt transmitter facility, became the station's late-morning host in September 1999 but left by that November to join WELW; Alexander, who helped build and sign on WELW in 1965, hailed that station as "an oasis" from corporate radio.

After Capstar's merger with Chancellor Media was completed on July 13, 1999, the combined entity was renamed AMFM, Inc. On October 3, 1999, only 82 days after AMFM's creation, Clear Channel Communications—which itself merged into Jacor earlier in the year—purchased AMFM, Inc. for $17.4 billion. Clear Channel elected to divest the entire seven-station AMFM cluster, selling WRMR and WKNR to Salem Communications on May 6, 2000, a deal that closed on July 20. Speculation was raised about the futures of both WRMR and WKNR under Salem ownership, including format changes at either station or asset swaps with another company. Salem had entered the market in April 1996 by purchasing WHK and installing on that station a Christian radio format, a core component of their religious and "family-friendly" programming. When the deal closed on August 25, 2000, Salem executives pledged to keep all current formats on their newly acquired stations in place.

Errol Dengler was appointed as general manager for the Salem Cleveland cluster, having previously managed WJMO, WZJM and WZAK. Staffing for WRMR was moved to and consolidated at Salem's studio facility in Independence, with Jim Davis reassuming operational duties. Several non-music programming was added to the station, including Kelly & Company—a brokered talk show hosted by Tom Kelly with sportscaster Bruce Drennan as a contributor—in afternoon drive. WRMR also signed up to carry Cleveland Rockers WNBA basketball games starting with the 2001 season, along with Ohio University Bobcats college football and basketball. Meanwhile, Carl Reese took an extended leave of absence after suffering a stroke on April 29, 2001, that paralyzed his entire right side; Reese's life was saved after a TPA shot was quickly administered.

=== 2001 "frequency swap" ===
Some people say this format is dying out because the fans are dying off... I disagree. Swing is having a real upsurge. This is music that transcends time. The people who grew up with Bach aren't around anymore either.

— Robert Conrad, on the adult standards format attracting older demographics

WRMR was one of seven Northeast Ohio radio stations that became involved in a complex exchange between Salem and two other radio companies. Announced on November 1, 2000, WCLV (95.5 FM) parent Radio Seaway reached an agreement to donate WCLV's assets to a nonprofit foundation; to finance the deal, Radio Seaway sold the 95.5 FM license to Salem and purchased the licenses for Lorain's 104.9 FM from Clear Channel and 1420 AM from Salem, while Salem sold the license for Canton's 98.1 FM to Clear Channel. 1420 AM had operated as Christian-formatted WHK, 98.1 FM was a full-time simulcast of WHK, and 104.9 FM was CHR-focused "KISS FM" WAKS. Robert Conrad, WCLV's co-founder and president, engineered the deal to preserve WCLV's classical format from being subsumed by mass consolidation in the industry, negotiating between both radio chains for nearly two years.

Due to the divestment of both frequencies WHK had utilized, Salem announced on May 17, 2001, that WHK's format and call letters would move to 1220 AM, and WKNR's sports format and call letters would move to 850 AM, effectively forcing WRMR off the air. Industry analyst Tom Taylor explained that the switch was a "Darwinian battle" where a sports format with lower ratings in the 12+ demographic is easier to sell to advertisers. Despite strong topline numbers, WRMR ranked near the bottom tier in the 25–54 demographic, seen by agencies as the most lucrative, and had a core demographic of 65 and older. An unrelated Lakewood video production company named "Salem Communications" was subjected to a stream of irate callers, prompting that firm's president Phil Salem to urge in one newspaper report to contact the radio station instead. General manager Error Dengler admitted that because of Salem's divestment of 1420 AM, they "ran out of radio stations" and thus had no available frequencies to move WRMR to. Meanwhile, Kent-licensed daytimer WJMP switched formats to MOYL fulltime in hopes of attracting a portion of the disaffected audience. Rumors also emerged of Indians owner Larry Dolan inquiring with Salem about purchasing both WRMR and WKNR, following prior reports of his interest in purchasing 1220 AM as a potential replacement Indians flagship.

Radio Seaway agreed on May 31, 2001, to acquire WRMR's intellectual property—reported on as "the WRMR format" but consisting of the station's music library and some equipment—for an undisclosed fee, placing the format on 1420 AM, affixed with the WCLV (AM) call sign. The transaction came at the expense of Radio Seaway's original plans of using WCLV (AM) as an outright simulcast of WCLV-FM; prompting a partial simulcast with Painesville's WBKC to be arranged. WCLV general manager Richard Marschner explained that WRMR was "too important a format to just let it die", while Robert Conrad quipped in reply to the standards format attracting older demos, "the people who grew up with Bach aren't around anymore either". Nearly all WRMR air talent was retained for WCLV (AM) except for Bill Randle and Rob Schuler; Randle joined WCLV (AM) in 2002, while Schuler stayed with Salem as WFHM-FM's midday host.

== WKNR (2001–present) ==
=== Sportstalk 850 ===
WKNR might best be described as a tribute to the radio industry's upheaval... The station's studios, located in a shoebox in Broadview Heights, speak to its nomadic existence. The mint-green paint on the front desk is peeling. Ceiling tiles look as if they haven't been touched since 1978. One half-expects to hear the theme from WKRP in Cincinnati and see Les Nessman round the corner.

— Andrew Putz, Cleveland Scene

When the switch took place on July 3, 2001, WRMR's callsign changed to WKNR. Branded "SportsTalk 850", the "new" WKNR at 850 AM inherited the previous WKNR's airstaff, including Greg Brinda, Kendall Lewis, Kenny Roda, Bruce Drennan and Ken Silverstein, along with the market's ESPN Radio affiliation and local carriage of The Jim Rome Show. Brinda, Lewis and Roda had all been veterans at the previous station: Brinda joined WKNR in 1991, Lewis in 1998 and Roda in 1992. A former WTAM host, Drennan was hired to host the previous WKNR's 10th Inning Indians postgame show at the start of the team's 2001 season. Originally solo hosts, Brinda and Lewis were paired in mid-mornings after Kelly & Company, inherited from WRMR and with Drennan continuing as a contributor was placed in Brinda's prior time slot and soon replaced with Drennan going solo.

Adopting the "Truth About Cleveland Sports" moniker, the station took on guerrilla-style tactics against WTAM, which held broadcast rights to all three professional sports teams. Drennan specifically engaged in on-air verbal confrontations against WTAM host Mike Trivisonno for perceived favoritism. Drennan's show was largely unconventional as he also focused on movie trivia and Broadway theater, even singing a theme song for his show to the tune of "Springtime for Hitler". The station's program director was Steve Legerski, who had joined the previous WKNR in 1999 under that same capacity. WKNR's studios were at the 1220 AM transmitter facilities in Broadview Heights, which were also used by the previous WKNR. A Cleveland Scene profile noted the building's neglect as a verbal metaphor for WKNR's repeated ownership changes and overall disinvestment after the Telecommunications Act of 1996.

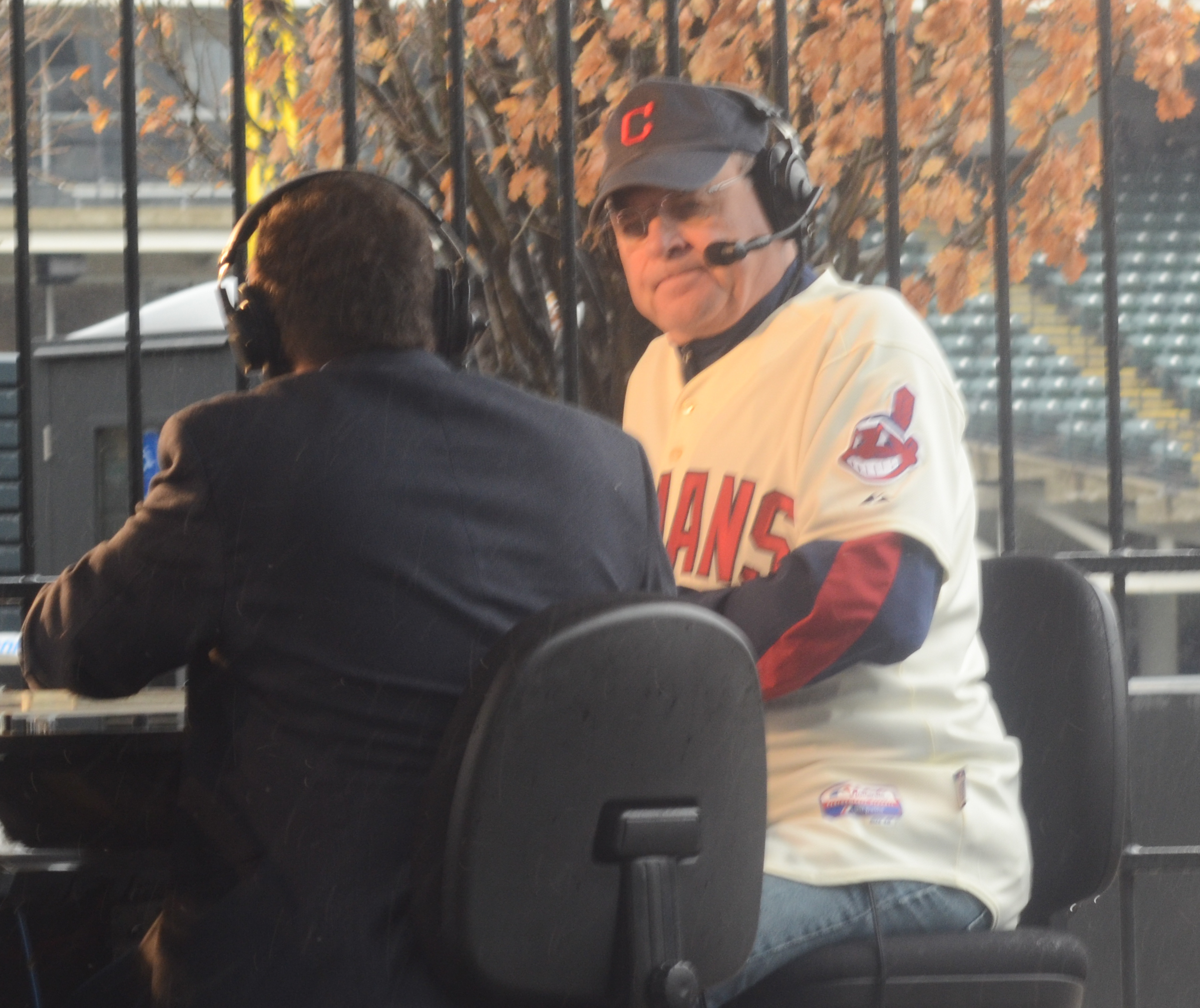
Bruce Drennan's combative personality and unconventional morning show made him a WKNR fixture from the station's 2001 move to 850 AM until his 2004 implication in an illegal sports betting operation.

As the new year started on January 5, 2004, Brinda, Lewis, Silverstein, Legerski and one show producer were all fired in budget-related cutbacks. Michael Luczak took over as program director, Bruce Drennan was reassigned to the midday slot, and ESPN Radio's Mike and Mike in the Morning took Drennan's place. Lewis did not take the firing personally despite it happening after his return from medical leave to fight a viral infection, saying "it's just the way this business goes". Brinda, however, returned to the station at the end of the month as a fill-in host and sports director later adding 10th Inning duties. A brokered hour-long taped sports show hosted by Dan Coughlin and Les Levine aired in the 6pm hour for two months until its cancellation after the show's producer had a falling out with Salem management. Likewise, a weekly program hosted by athletic trainer Eric Lichter ended prematurely on Lichter's part when a series of on-air technical difficulties plagued production. Rumors of WKNR dropping sports for conservative talk—which had existed since the frequency change—ended when Salem repurchased WRMR (1420 AM) on July 6, 2004, and relaunched it as a talk station branded "WHK"; general manager Errol Dengler saw the purchase as a way to dispel the format change rumors even as it remained only one of three sports stations in the company's portfolio.

The station attracted unwanted attention on September 27, 2004, when Bruce Drennan's home was raided by FBI and IRS agents as part of a wide-ranging investigation into illegal sports gambling, a problem compounded by Salem's reputation as a "family-friendly" broadcaster. Drennan was removed from the air for several days by WKNR management in an attempt to downplay the news, his return did not include any mention of the raid or the allegations against him. After further coverage in The Plain Dealer detailed the sports gambling ring and included taped conversations with Drennan, WKNR placed him on indefinite administrative leave with Greg Brinda taking Drennan's time slot. Salem's continued practice of clearing brokered programming and infomercials on WKNR prevented the station from broadcasting ESPN's MLB play-by-play throughout this era, including the entirety of the 2004 World Series. The station hosted a third "tour stop" for Jim Rome on October 9, 2004, after successful live events in 1999 and 2000; WKNR agreed to it after Rome's normal appearance fee was waived.

ESPN Radio abruptly gave WKNR a 90-day cancellation notice effective on October 8, 2006; Luczak both publicly confirmed the move and that an upcoming transaction would result in a new ESPN outlet airing the programming 24 hours a day. Shortly thereafter, Good Karma Broadcasting purchased WABQ (1540 AM)—a 1,000 watt station based in Cleveland's Fairfax neighborhood—for $2.5 million, agreeing to a new ESPN affiliation deal. Good Karma's founder and president Craig Karmazin considered Cleveland to be "the next logical market" for the chain to expand to, already operating sports talkers in Madison, Milwaukee and West Palm Beach. Owing to WABQ's daytime-only status, the change meant ESPN programming at night could not be carried, rumors of a nighttime purchase of airtime on WERE emerged but never were consummated. This also meant that a daily program hosted by Karmazin and associate Steve Politziner could not be carried in Cleveland throughout the winter months. Karmazin moved to Cleveland to help relaunch WABQ as "ESPN Radio 1540" WWGK, a practice he had previously done with other station launches, and predicted that WWGK could have a positive cash flow within 18 months. WKNR concurrently replaced ESPN programming by becoming the market's Fox Sports Radio affiliate.

=== New ownership and ESPN Radio ===
I was in Glidden House [the upscale inn near University Circle] the other day. There were two older women there having tea... if you saw them in New York, they'd be talking politics or something very high brow. They're talking Mangini and Holmgren! In the Glidden House! It's the only town in America that's like that.

— Aaron Goldhammer, on the passionate nature of Cleveland sports fans

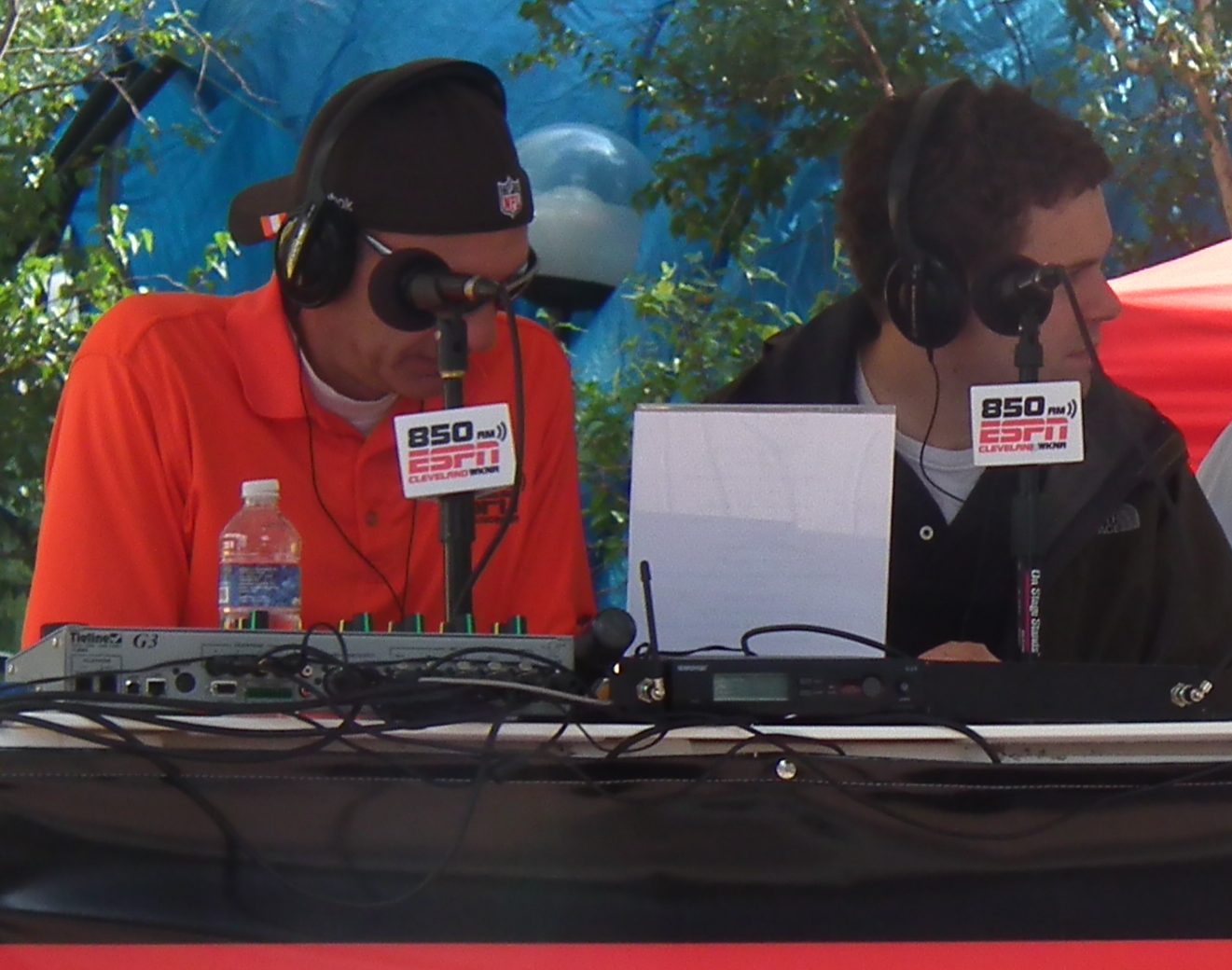
Tony Rizzo and Aaron Goldhammer (shown here in 2011) have hosted WKNR's late morning "Really Big Show" since 2007.

Mere weeks after WWGK's launch, Salem sold WKNR to Good Karma for $7 million on December 4, 2006. Craig Karmazin saw WKNR as "a dream scenario" and a "sleeping giant" that still had a loyal audience despite the many ownership and programming changes, and did not even anticipate owning both stations until Salem agreed to the sale. A local marketing agreement immediately began for WKNR, with Karmazin assuming the role of general manager and pledging to reinvest into local programming and coverage of area teams. Veteran radio programmer and consultant Mike McVay saw the new ownership as a way to breathe new life into a station that failed to properly market the "move" from 1220 AM and thus fell into obscurity. As a sign of things to come, WKNR carried 24 straight hours of local pregame leading into Ohio State Sports Network coverage of the 2007 BCS National Championship Game, with WJW sports anchor Tony Rizzo joining Brinda and Roda among the on-air hosts.

A steady series of management, personnel and programming shakeups resulted from Good Karma's takeover of WKNR. The biggest moves took place on February 23, 2007, when ESPN Radio programming moved back to WKNR and WWGK added Fox Sports Radio programming dubbed "1540 KNR2". The same day, Rizzo on the Radio—a late-morning show featuring Rizzo—debuted, moving Greg Brinda to a new evening slot. Karmazin considered Rizzo a linchpin of the revamped station, saying, "he is as Cleveland as you can get... he's a regular guy." Rizzo was paired with producer Aaron Goldhammer on referral from Karmazin, quickly setting up a "good cop/bad cop" motif and an eventual name change to The Really Big Show. The following month, WMMS/WMJI personality Mark "Munch" Bishop was hired for afternoon drive and former Cavaliers TV play-by-play voice Michael Reghi took over as host for a local Cavs post-game call in show, moving Kenny Roda to early evenings. Play-by-play of Lake Erie Monsters AHL hockey and Cleveland Gladiators AFL football was added as a supplement to ESPN's play-by-play and Ohio State affiliation. Karamzin's investment into the duopoly included a $50,000 combined studio space at the Galleria at Erieview that opened later in 2007. The former Broadview Heights facilities for WKNR, which remain as the transmitter site for WHKW, have since been used for engineering space and storage.

=== FM sports talk rival ===
Rizzo's family connection to professional wrestling — his father Jack Reynolds was an announcer for multiple promotions, including the WWF (now WWE)—has influenced his on-air approach at WKNR, admitting it would be a lie if he said there was not "a little WWE" on his show. Aaron Goldhammer's antagonistic persona quickly polarized listeners, with one Plain Dealer profile labeling him "the most hated man in sports radio", a villainous role he admitted to relishing. Chris Fedor, who joined the station in 2002 as a third shift board operator, also polarized Really Big Show listeners with his pessimistic persona, prompting Rizzo to call him "Negative Ned" in jest. A Really Big Show contest where listeners called in to identify the source of a short audio clip went awry after the clip picked was unidentifiable and ended after two years with no winner; WKNR was fined $4,000 by the FCC after discrepancies emerged with the station's contest rules online and over-the-air. One particularly weak spot among critics was the lack of any minority on-air hosts since the 2004 dismissal of Kendall Lewis which was addressed with X's and O's with The Pros on WWGK, hosted by LeCharles Bentley and Je'Rod Cherry. X's and O's was ultimately moved to evenings on WKNR on July 6, 2010, adding Dustin Fox as a contributor, while Reghi and Roda were concurrently paired up in afternoons, and Brinda and Fedor paired in evenings.

The station gained an in-market competitor when CBS Radio's WKRK-FM adopted a sports format on August 29, 2011, but Karmazin welcomed the change, believing Cleveland could support as many as six sports stations. Coincidentally, Karamzin began his broadcasting career as an intern for WKRK-FM program director Andy Roth when Roth worked at Philadelphia's WIP. The switch also came at the expense of WKNR's affiliation with the NFL on Westwood One Sports, which moved to WKRK-FM. WKNR opted to go all-local in evenings, pairing up Brinda, Fedor and Bruce Hooley for The Hooligans in afternoons, a rebranded 3 Deep with Bentley and Cherry in early evenings, and Reghi and Roda in late nights. Fox left for WKRK-FM and Bentley resigned from the station, prompting Cherry to team with Emmett Golden and Will Burge for 3 Deep, while Fedor was replaced by T.J. Zuppe early in 2013. WKNR entered into a cooperative with the Cleveland Browns to broadcast Cleveland Browns Daily—a year-round one-hour program produced by the team—that debuted on July 29, 2011, despite the team still under a long-term radio contract with WTAM and WMMS. Following longtime Plain Dealer Browns beat writer Tony Grossi's dismissal from the newspaper after an errant tweet regarding Browns owner Randy Lerner, WKNR hired him for the same position on March 12, 2012, supplanting Will Burge in the role. Hooley also joined the station amid controversy, having been fired from Ohio State flagship WBNS-FM in March 2011 after openly criticizing Jim Tressel for failing to address a recruiting scandal with the Buckeyes football team, purportedly angering the university.

=== Cleveland Browns football ===
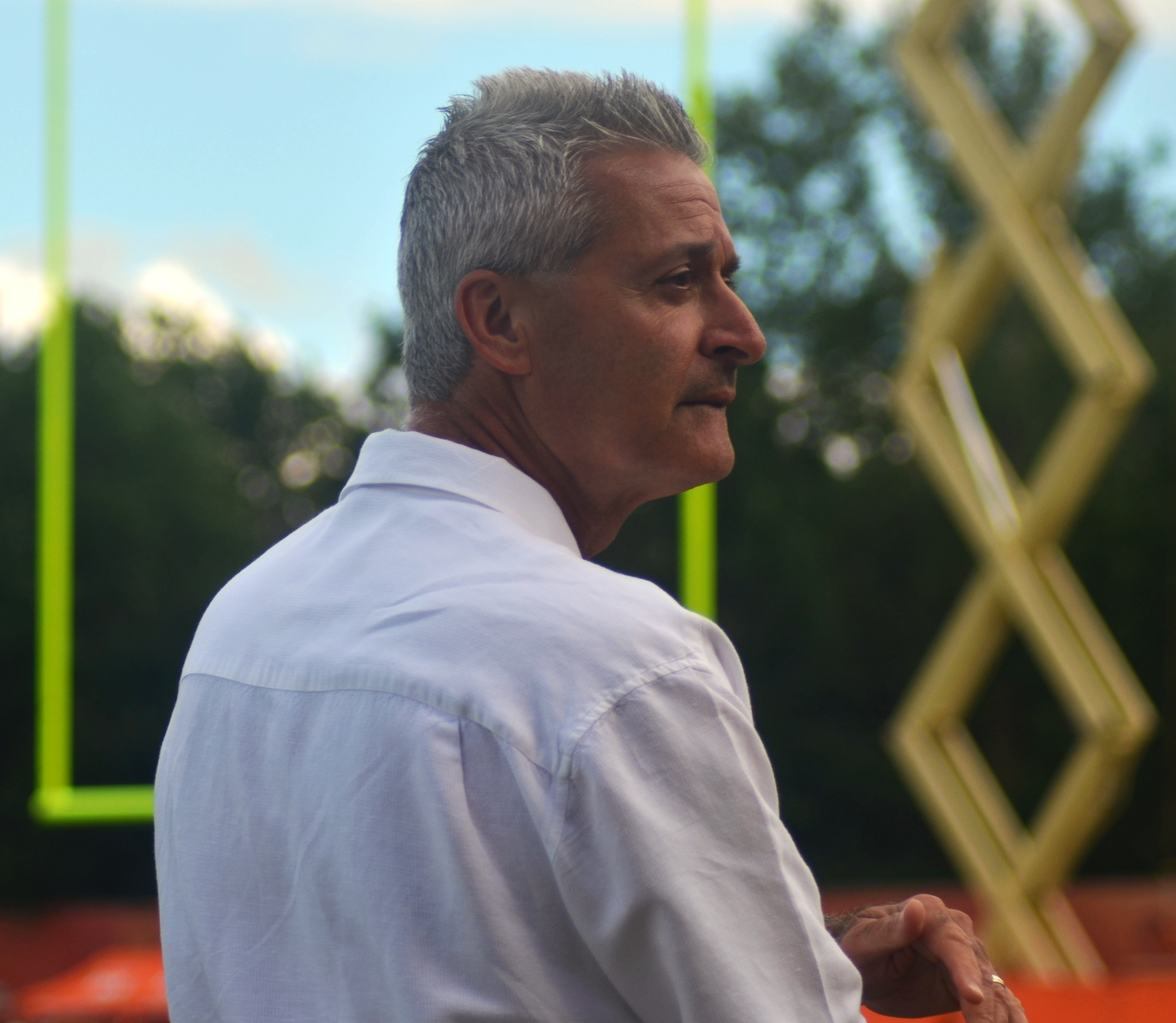
Tony Grossi has been with WKNR since 2012 at their Cleveland Browns beat reporter.

The most significant move made by WKNR under Good Karma ownership came on March 28, 2013, when the station—along with CBS Radio's WKRK-FM and WNCX—were awarded the flagship rights to the Cleveland Browns Radio Network. The unusual partnership between rival sports stations was struck in mid-October 2012 at Craig Karmazin's urging, who compared it to CBS's co-op with Turner Sports for NCAA men's basketball tournament coverage and saw the Browns being such a strong community asset that it could be workable. Browns president Alec Scheiner favored the CBS-Good Karma bid as neither station would have schedule conflicts with Indians games, which had been an issue with WTAM since Clear Channel was awarded the rights in 1999. The "triple cast" deal also marked a return for the Browns to the WKNR nameplate; the previous WKNR was Browns flagship from 1994 to 1995 under a joint venture with WDOK. As part of the new pact, Cleveland Browns Daily was expanded to a two-hour midday show as the centerpiece of over 1,000 annual hours of ancillary team-produced programming. The expansion of Browns Daily also came at the expense of The Jim Rome Show, which was moved to WWGK outright, the first hour had previously aired on WWGK only. WKNR also added Matt Wilhelm as a football analyst for the 2013 NFL draft. Additionally, former Plain Dealer and Akron Beacon Journal Cavaliers beat reporter and current ESPN NBA insider Brian Windhorst was signed as the station's Cavaliers beat reporter and analyst for the team's 2014–15 season.

Despite the Browns addition, WKNR's lineup was rearranged again by August 2013 with the dismissals of Will Burge, T.J. Zuppe and Kenny Roda, while Reghi remained with the station as a Browns Daily co-host. This ended a 21-year tenure for Roda at both the previous and current WKNR. Speculation suggested that WKRK-FM, due to being on the FM dial, was now negatively impacting WKNR's ratings. One Cleveland Scene story suggested WKNR dropped their subscription to Nielsen Audio because The Really Big Show was now being outdrawn substantially by WKRK-FM's Baskin and Phelps and termed the Browns contract a loss leader for both sports stations. Karmazin had previously defended severing ties with Nielsen, arguing as early as 2008 that their ratings system is "the product of 'a telemarketing agency'".

The Really Big Show remained financially successful as the station's "cash cow", with Rizzo in particular as a reliable pitchman for multiple local advertisers but continued to court controversy. Recurring Really Big Show sidekick Sabrina Parr was fired by WKNR on May 10, 2017, after accusing Jabrill Peppers—recently drafted by the Browns—of being "on the lean and molly". In a previous stint at the station, Parr gave an eyewitness account of an October 7, 2009, altercation between Braylon Edwards and Edward Givens at a local bar. Tony Rizzo was arrested on a domestic violence charge on December 6, 2013, but conducted his show the next morning even as police reports surfaced regarding the charge; Rizzo was ultimately sentenced to two years probation and a suspended 30-day jail sentence. Two years later, on December 11, 2016, Rizzo assailed the "Perfect Season Parade", set up by Twitter user Chris McNeil as a satirical protest to the (at that point) winless 2016 Browns season, during the station's postgame show. Rizzo challenged anyone involved with planning the parade to a fight at the restaurant he was broadcasting from, and claimed he would "mow you down under my tires... if you have that parade it will get ugly". The stunt backfired when Dan Le Batard played audio from Rizzo's outburst on his ESPN Radio show and suggested listeners donate to the parade's GoFundMe page, which doubled their fundraising goal in less than 24 hours.

WKNR unveiled a subscription-driven platform billed The Land on Demand on May 1, 2017, enabling full access to audio archives for the station's live programming and podcasts for either a monthly or annual fee. This platform was initially criticized and ridiculed on social media, with Chris McNeil considering the pricing tiers to reflective of the station's overall aloof attitude, while Talkers Magazine publisher Michael Harrison considered the platform "innovative" for finding a way to provide content without commercials. Former programming executive Jason Barrett suggested on his media analysis website that WKNR could add more exclusive content to entice subscribers, but applauded the station for taking a risk and noted that any improvement would further help refine the platform. Good Karma later launched a similar platform for their ESPN affiliates in Milwaukee and Madison titled Wisconsin on Demand.

=== Recent years ===
The more a host can be relatable in everyday life -- the better he or she can connect with a fan. That's why it is important for good sports talent to not just know sports, but to be able to talk about life. I can easily recall memorable content recently about snowstorms, the GameStop/Reddit stock thing, and Valentine's Day. If you're not talking about what everyone is talking about as a host, you become very two-dimensional.

— Matt Fishman, WKNR's director of content, on the qualities that make for a good sports radio host

Tony Grossi was suspended by the station on February 25. 2020, after derisively calling Browns quarterback Baker Mayfield "a f----- midget" when his microphone was erroneously left on during a commercial break that was only accessible to online streamers. It was not the first incident regarding WKNR and Mayfield, as Aaron Goldhammer promised to eat horse manure on-air if the Browns drafted Mayfield in 2018; social media criticism pressured Goldhammer into agreeing to do so. Grossi's reinstatement and apology on March 10 came one day before the suspension of the 2019–20 NBA season and onset of the COVID-19 pandemic in the United States, forcing all but two station personnel to work from home. WWGK temporarily switched on April 22, 2020, to a relay of SiriusXM's "Doctor Radio" channel and related COVID-19 information programming following a similar move by Good Karma's WAUK in Milwaukee. WKNR kept the sports format largely intact by maintaining focus on Browns-related topics and the NFL draft, although Ohio Governor Mike DeWine became a regular guest. Ultimately, no layoffs or furloughs occurred at any of the stations in the entire Good Karma chain as a result of the pandemic.

In the wake of mass unrest over the murder of George Floyd, WKNR collaborated with 21 radio stations owned by iHeartMedia, Entercom, Radio One and Salem to simulcast a town hall meeting regarding race relations on June 17, 2020, hosted by Romona Robinson. The station publicly announced a "stick to sports" commitment on October 28, 2020, eschewing politics entirely as means of escapism for listeners; in a taped promo, Rizzo said, "frankly, I'm relieved". Director of content Matt Fishman, who joined the station in January after prior work with KCSP and Sirius XM, stated that the move was not driven by any particular incident or issue, but after gauging listener feedback when controversial subjects were brought up. Fishman praised both Je'Rod Cherry and Emmett Golden for providing needed perspective during the June 2020 protests that connected to people of all backgrounds, while Golden's work helped earn him a role in co-owned WGKB/Milwaukee's relaunch with an African American-focused talk format.

Atypical of most radio stations, Good Karma continues to de-emphasizes Nielsen Audio ratings in favor of revenue and cash flow. Subscriber metrics for The Land on Demand and social media have been emphasized as more reliable and tangible for advertisers, with WKNR's Twitter account having more followers than any other account for like-formatted radio stations. Former Cleveland Brown quarterback Bernie Kosar signed up with WKNR in September 2020 as a contributor for The Really Big Show and The Next Level, along with launching a Land on Demand podcast. Bruce Drennan also signed up to host a weekly sports betting podcast that WKNR would also carry on the weekends, re-associating himself with the station since his 2004 dismissal.

Good Karma and Entercom (succeeding owners of WKRK-FM and WNCX) agreed on August 13, 2020, to a long-term contract extension with the Cleveland Browns. The extension paid off as the Browns qualified for the NFL playoffs for the first time in 18 years; WKNR aired a 24-hour long local pregame show leading into the team's first playoff game against the Pittsburgh Steelers, hosted by Emmett Golden throughout.

In late 2021, WKNR moved its studios from the Galleria to a new location on the East Bank of The Flats in downtown Cleveland.

== Programming ==
=== Regular schedule ===
Local weekday programming on WKNR includes The Really Big Show with Tony Rizzo and Aaron Goldhammer late mornings, and The Next Level with Je'Rod Cherry and Emmett Golden middays. Golden and Goldhammer host an hour long bridge program - RBS Next - at noon in between the previously mentioned shows. Cleveland Browns Daily with Nathan Zegura and Beau Bishop, a Browns Radio Network program exclusive to WKNR, airs in afternoon drive. Goldhammer and Golden also host a show Saturday mornings heard nationally on ESPN Radio.

Local PGA golf pro Jimmy Hanlin hosts a weekend golf show when the Browns aren't in season. During football season, WKNR airs High School Hysteria, a Friday night talk show focusing on area high school football games featuring scores and recaps.

WKNR carries ESPN Radio in morning drive, evenings, overnight, and the bulk of the day on weekends.

=== Play-by-play ===
In conjunction with Audacy-owned WKRK-FM and WNCX, WKNR is currently the AM flagship of a 26-station radio network for the Cleveland Browns (NFL); all games are broadcast live. Browns Radio Network coverage includes the four-hour network pregame show; it and WKRK-FM simulcast a weekly Wednesday night preview show and a Thursday night coaches' show during the NFL season. The station airs local programming around Browns game coverage including ESPN Cleveland Prime Time with Chris Oldach and ESPN reporter Jake Trotter after the game.

WKNR is additionally the Cleveland affiliate for the Ohio State Sports Network via Learfield Sports, carrying Ohio State Buckeyes (NCAA) football and men's basketball games, along with ancillary programing such as coach's shows. During football season WKNR airs local programming around OSU game coverage, with Buckeye Gameday with Nick Paulus and Kevan Arnold airing prior to the network pregame show.

As Cleveland's ESPN Radio affiliate, WKNR also carries the network's national coverage of MLB, the NBA, the NFL, and NCAA football.
