= Triumph Records =

Triumph Records may refer to:

- Triumph Records (US), a United States-based company
- Triumph Records (UK), a United Kingdom-based company

== See also ==
- List of record labels
