= Varetta Dillard =

American singer

Background information
- Born: Varetta Mamie Dillard; February 3, 1933; Harlem, New York City, United States
- Died: October 4, 1993 (aged 60) Brooklyn, New York, United States
- Genres: R&B
- Occupation: Singer
- Years active: 1951 – early 1960s
- Labels: Savoy; Groove; RCA; Triumph; Club

Varetta Mamie Dillard (February 3, 1933 – October 4, 1993) was an American rhythm and blues singer in the 1950s whose biggest hit was "Mercy, Mr. Percy".

== Life and career ==
She was born in Harlem, New York, and spent much of her childhood in hospital due to a congenital bone condition. By her mid-teens, her condition had stabilised, though she remained unable to walk without crutches or other assistance. She met Carl Feaster of doo-wop group The Chords, who encouraged her to enter talent contests as a singer, and in 1951 she won two consecutive competitions at the Apollo Theater. She was signed by Savoy Records, and had her first recording session with the company in September 1951. Although her early singles were commercially unsuccessful, she was invited by Alan Freed to perform at what later became recognised as the first major rock and roll concert: the Moondog Coronation Ball held in Cleveland, Ohio on March 21, 1952. Because of concerns over crowd safety, the concert was shut down by the authorities after the first song by Paul "Hucklebuck" Williams, and Dillard did not perform in the event. However, her next record, "Easy, Easy Baby", reached No. 8 on the Billboard R&B chart in July 1952, being especially popular in the South.

She then toured with Oran "Hot Lips" Page and The Five Keys before the record company paired her with singer H-Bomb Ferguson for a series of duets. After further tours with Larry Darnell and Wynonie Harris, she had her biggest hit in mid 1953 with "Mercy, Mr. Percy", which reached No. 6 on the R&B chart. The track was recorded on May 15, 1953, with George Kelly (tenor sax), Haywood Henry (baritone sax), Lonnie Johnson (guitar), Lee Anderson (piano), Prince Babbs (bass), and Gene Brooks (drums), and was arranged by Leroy Kirkland. The song was nationally popular and became her theme song, but she had difficulty following it up and took time off to have a daughter with her husband Ronald Mack. Her next major success, and final chart hit, came in early 1955 when she recorded "Johnny Has Gone", a tribute to singer Johnny Ace who had died as a result of an accidentally self-inflicted gunshot. Dillard's recording was one of the more popular of several tributes to Ace and reached No. 6 on the R&B chart. She continued to tour, and starred in the first rock and roll show in New Jersey in May 1955.

She left the Savoy label in early 1956 and signed for the RCA subsidiary label Groove, where she issued several singles, including "I Miss You Jimmy", a tribute to James Dean. In 1957, she moved to the main RCA label, and recorded tracks backed by The Cookies and produced by Leiber and Stoller, but they were again unsuccessful commercially, and she was dropped by the label in early 1958. She went on to record for the Triumph label set up by Herb Abramson, and then for the Club label, a subsidiary of MGM. Her last recordings were in 1961.

In the early 1960s, she joined her husband's gospel group, the Tri-Odds, who were active in the Civil Rights Movement. She later worked as a music therapist, with chronically ill children. Two compilations of her recordings from the late 1950s, Got You on My Mind and The Lovin' Bird, were issued by Bear Family Records in 1989.

She died of cancer in 1993 at the age of 60 in Brooklyn, New York.

== Popular culture ==
Her hit "Mercy, Mr. Percy" can be heard on the radio in Mafia II.

== Discography ==
=== Singles ===
Year	Title	Label
1951	"Please Come Back to Me"	Savoy Records
1951	"Love and Wine"	Savoy Records
1952	"Easy, Easy Baby"	Savoy Records
1952	"A Letter In Blues"	Savoy Records
1952	"Them There Eyes"	Savoy Records
1952	"You Are Gone"	Savoy Records
1952	"Here In My Heart"	Savoy Records
1952	"I'm Yours"	Savoy Records
1952	"I Cried and Cried"	Savoy Records
1952	"Double Crossing Daddy"	Savoy Records
1952	"Tortured Love" (with H-Bomb Ferguson)	Savoy Records
1952	"Please Tell Me Why"	Savoy Records
1952	"Hurry Up"	Savoy Records
1953	"Mercy, Mr. Percy"	Savoy Records
1953	"No Kinda Good, No How"	Savoy Records
1953	"Getting Ready for My Daddy"	Savoy Records
1953	"Three Lies"	Savoy Records
1953	"I Ain't Gonna' Tell"	Savoy Records
1953	"My Mind Is Working"	Savoy Records
1953	"I Love You"	Savoy Records
1953	"I Love You Just the Same"	Savoy Records
1954	"Send Me Some Money"	Savoy Records
1954	"Love"	Savoy Records
1955	"The Answer To My Prayer"	Savoy Records
1955	"Promise Mr. Thomas"	Savoy Records
1955	"Johnny Has Gone"	Savoy Records
1955	"so Many Ways"	Savoy Records
1955	"I'll Never Forget You"	Savoy Records
1955	"I Can't Stop Now"	Savoy Records
1956	"Mama Don't Want (What Poppa Don't Want)"	Groove Records
1956	"Darling, Listen to The Words of This Song"	Groove Records
1956	"Got You On My Mind"	Groove Records
1956	"Skinny Jimmy"	Groove Records
1956	"I Miss You Jimmy"	Groove Records
1956	"If You Want to Be My Baby"	Groove Records
1956	"One More Time"	Groove Records
1956	"I Can't Help Myself"	Groove Records
1956	"I'm Gonna Tell My Daddy"	Groove Records
1956	"Cherry Blossom"	Groove Records
1957	"That's Why I Cry"	RCA Victor
1957	"Undecided"	RCA Victor
1957	"Time Was"	RCA Victor
1957	"I Got A Lot of Love"	RCA Victor
1957	"Pray for Me Mother"	RCA Victor
1957	"Leave A Happy Fool Alone"	RCA Victor
1958	"Just Multiply"	RCA Victor
1958	"What'll I Do"	RCA Victor
1958	"Star Of Fortune"	RCA Victor
1958	"The Rules of Love"	RCA Victor
1959	"Scorched"	Triumph Records
1959	"Good Gravy Baby"	Triumph Records
1960	"Teaser"	Cub Records
1960	"I Know I'm Good for You"	Cub Records
1961	"You Better Come Home"	Cub Records
1961	"I Don't Know What It Is But I Like It"	Cub Records
1961	"A Little Bitty Tear"	Cub Records
1961	"Mercy, Mr. Percy" (re-recording)	Cub Records
1962	"Breaking Hearts" (with The Thomases)	Brent Records
1962	"Fly By Night" (with The Thomases)	Brent Records

=== Albums ===
- Johnny Has Gone (EP) (1956)
