= Len Barker's perfect game =

1981 baseball game

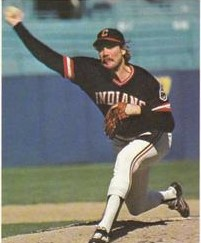
- Len Barker pitched the 10th perfect game in Major League Baseball history.
Toronto Blue Jays	Cleveland Indians
0	3
	1	2	3	4	5	6	7	8	9	R	H	E
Toronto Blue Jays	0	0	0	0	0	0	0	0	0	0	0	3
Cleveland Indians	2	0	0	0	0	0	0	1	X	3	7	0
- Date: May 15, 1981
- Venue: Cleveland Stadium
- City: Cleveland, Ohio
- Managers: Bobby Mattick (Toronto Blue Jays); Dave Garcia (Cleveland Indians)
- Umpires: HP: Rich Garcia; 1B: Greg Kosc; 2B: Don Denkinger (cc); 3B: Jim McKean
- Television: Cleveland: WUAB channel 43
- TV announcers: Cleveland: Joe Tait and Bruce Drennan
- Radio: Cleveland: WWWE (3WE) 1100 AM
- Radio announcers: Cleveland: Herb Score and Nev Chandler

On May 15, 1981, Len Barker of the Cleveland Indians threw a perfect game against the Toronto Blue Jays at Cleveland Stadium, the 10th perfect game in Major League Baseball history. The Indians defeated the Blue Jays 3–0.

Barker had struggled with his control early in his career; he only made the majors for good two years earlier, in 1979. That night, however, his control was so good that he never once reached ball three against any Blue Jay hitter, and only eight Blue Jays pushed him as far as ball two. They were particularly flummoxed by Barker's curveball. He struck out 11 Blue Jays hitters (all of them swinging) including seven of the last 11 batters.

Barker's perfect game is the most recent no-hitter thrown by a Cleveland pitcher. "I run into people almost every day who want to talk about it," Barker said in 2006. "Everyone says, 'You're probably tired of talking about it.' I say, 'No, it's something to be proud of.' It's a special thing." The Cleveland Guardians have the longest active no-hitter drought in MLB.

Terry Pluto, the normal Indians beat reporter for The Plain Dealer, was unable to cover the game due to a prior commitment. The Plain Dealer dispatched second-year reporter Tony Grossi, later of ESPN, in his place.

Barker was the first perfect game pitcher who did not come to bat during the entire game, with the American League having adopted the designated hitter in 1973.

Ron Hassey, Barker's catcher, would catch Dennis Martínez's perfect game in 1991, thus becoming the only catcher, to date, to catch two perfect games and the only one to catch a perfect game in both leagues.

Danny Ainge, who would play 14 seasons in the NBA, was on the losing end of this game. He grounded out and struck out in his two at-bats; in the ninth inning, he was pinch-hit for by Alvis Woods, who struck out.

== Statistics ==
Statistics taken from Baseball-Reference.com

=== Linescore ===
Team	1	2	3	4	5	6	7	8	9	R	H	E
Toronto Blue Jays (10–22)	0	0	0	0	0	0	0	0	0	0	0	3
Cleveland Indians (16–8)	2	0	0	0	0	0	0	1	x	3	7	0
WP: Len Barker (3–1) LP: Luis Leal (2–4); Home runs: TOR: None; CLE: Jorge Orta (2)

=== Box score ===
Toronto	AB	R	H	RBI	BB	SO	AVG
Alfredo Griffin, SS	3	0	0	0	0	0	.203
Lloyd Moseby, RF	3	0	0	0	0	2	.231
George Bell, LF	3	0	0	0	0	2	.269
John Mayberry, 1B	3	0	0	0	0	2	.261
Willie Upshaw, DH	3	0	0	0	0	0	.196
Dámaso García, 2B	3	0	0	0	0	2	.216
Rick Bosetti, CF	3	0	0	0	0	0	.323
Danny Ainge, 3B	2	0	0	0	0	1	.183
Alvis Woods, PH	1	0	0	0	0	1	.213
Buck Martinez, C	2	0	0	0	0	1	.182
Ernie Whitt, PH	1	0	0	0	0	0	.186
Totals	27	0	0	0	0	11	.000

Toronto	IP	H	R	ER	BB	SO	HR	ERA
Luis Leal (L, 2-4)	8	7	3	1	0	5	1	3.43
Totals	8	7	3	1	0	5	1	1.12

Cleveland	AB	R	H	RBI	BB	SO	AVG
Rick Manning, CF	4	1	1	0	0	1	.164
Jorge Orta, RF	4	1	3	1	0	0	.280
Mike Hargrove, 1B	4	1	1	0	0	0	.215
Andre Thornton, DH	3	0	0	1	0	0	.226
Ron Hassey, C	4	0	1	1	0	0	.208
Toby Harrah, 3B	4	0	1	0	0	1	.233
Joe Charboneau, LF	3	0	0	0	0	1	.216
Duane Kuiper, 2B	3	0	0	0	0	2	.320
Tom Veryzer, SS	3	0	0	0	0	0	.308
Totals	32	3	7	3	0	5	.219

Cleveland	IP	H	R	ER	BB	SO	HR	ERA
Len Barker (W, 3-1)	9	0	0	0	0	11	0	1.31
Totals	9	0	0	0	0	11	0	0.00
