= Rick Wayne =

St. Lucia bodybuilder, journalist and politician

Rick Wayne OBE
- Born: Learie Carasco; January 27, 1938 (age 88); Saint Lucia
- Other name: Ricky Wayne
- Years active: 1960s–present
- Spouse(s): Mae Sabbagh Wayne; Hazel Eastmond

Rick Wayne, OBE (born Learie Carasco, 27 January 1938), is a St. Lucia media personality, journalist, politician, book author and former professional bodybuilder and pop singer.

== Biography ==
Wayne was born Learie Carasco in St. Lucia. In the 1950s he emigrated to England, and served two years in the Royal Signals, most of the time in Yorkshire. On returning to civilian life in London, he was spotted singing in a club and successfully auditioned for record producer Joe Meek. Renamed as Ricky Wayne (a combination of Ricky Nelson and John Wayne), he released a single, "Hot Chickaroo", which was produced by Meek and on which Wayne was backed by The Fabulous Flee-Rakkers. Although the single and its follow-ups were not commercial successes, Wayne established a singing career for several years and for a while had his own show on Radio Luxembourg.

== Professional bodybuilding ==
Wayne was a professional bodybuilder in the 1960s and 1970s, competing in several bodybuilding competitions:

- 1964 Mr Europe – FIHC, 1st
- 1964 World – Universe – FIHC, 2nd
- 1965 Universe – IFBB, 1st
- 1966 Universe – Pro – NABBA, 2nd
- 1967 Universe – IFBB, 1st
- 1967 Mr World – IFBB, 1st
- 1967 Mr World – IFBB, Overall Winner
- 1969 Universe – IFBB, 1st
- 1970 Pro Mr America – WBBG, Winner
- 1970 Mr World – IFBB, 1st
- 1974 Pro Mr World – WBBG, 2nd
- 1981 Grand Prix California – IFBB, Did not place

== Writing, journalism and publishing ==
Wayne is the author of numerous articles and books on bodybuilding and politics. While pursuing a professional bodybuilding career, he began to write regularly for bodybuilding magazines, particularly Joe Weider's Muscle Builder and Flex in the 1970s and '80s (two separate periods of employment). He also wrote for Dan Lurie's Muscular Development magazine in 1994–95.

Wayne moved back to St. Lucia (where he now resides) and in 1986, in collaboration with his now wife, former US bodybuilder Mae Mollica Sabbagh, founded the Star Publishing Company. Its publications include a newspaper, St Lucia Star, and two magazines, Tropical Traveller and She Caribbean. The St Lucia Star is a hard-hitting controversial newspaper that has incurred the wrath of both major political parties on the island.

Wayne served as an opposition party senator until 1998, when he was booted out of the Senate by then Prime Minister Kenny Anthony for his opposition of a government guarantee of a failing St. Lucian airline.

Wayne is the host of a politically charged local television talk show, simply called Talk, which features on DBS TV for a Thursday-night slot of two and a half hours. He is known for aggressive interviews and fiery comments about various ills on the island. He rails about press freedom, whether locally or internationally.

=== Bibliography ===
(The Library of Congress lists five books in its collection:)

Books about Politics

- It'll Be Alright in the Morning (1977)
- Foolish Virgins (2002)
- Lapses & Infelicities – An Insider Perspective of Politics in the Caribbean (2010)

Books about Bodybuilding

- Arms and Shoulders Above the Rest (1976)
- The Bodymen (1978)
- The Bodymen II (1979)
- 3 More Reps! – The Science of Advanced Bodybuilding (Books 1, 2 and 3, 1978–1980) with George Snyder
- Women of the Olympia (1981) with George Snyder
- Muscle Wars: The Behind-the-Scenes Story of Competitive Bodybuilding (1985)
- Posedown! (Muscletalk With the Champs) (1987) with George Snyder

== Award ==
In 2007, Wayne was honoured as an Officer of the Order of the British Empire in the Queen's Birthday Honours List for his contribution to journalism in St. Lucia.
