= Moondog Coronation Ball =

Landmark popular music event; regarded as the first major rock and roll concert

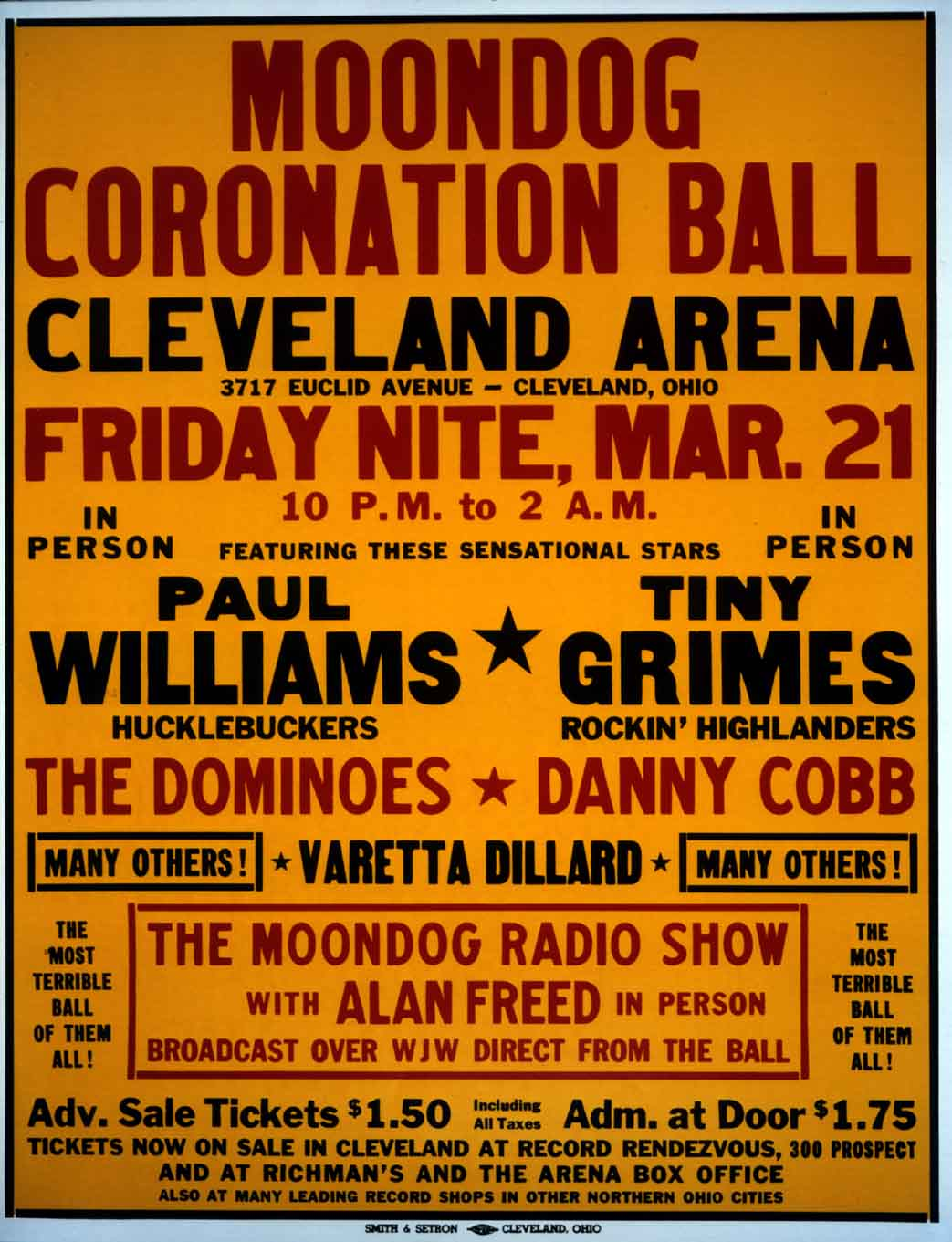
Concert poster

The Moondog Coronation Ball was a concert held at the Cleveland Arena in Cleveland, Ohio, on March 21, 1952. It is generally accepted as the first major rock and roll concert. A follow-up tribute series of annual shows began in 1992 and was still being held as of 2014.

== Background ==
Alan Freed was a disc jockey credited with popularizing the term "Rock and Roll". He had joined WJW in 1951 as the host of a classical-music program, but took up a different kind of music at the suggestion of Cleveland record-store owner Leo Mintz, who had noted with great interest the growing popularity, among young customers of all races, of rhythm-and-blues records by black musicians", according to the "History" website. Mintz decided to sponsor Freed's three hours of late-night programming. Once they saw the popularity of the program increase, they decided on holding a live dance event featuring some of the artists whose records were appearing on Freed's show.

== Concert ==
The concert was organized by Freed, along with Lew Platt, a local concert promoter, and Freed's sponsors, including Mintz, owner of the Record Rendezvous store. The concert featured Paul Williams and the Hucklebuckers, and Tiny Grimes and the Rocking Highlanders (an African American instrumental group that appeared in kilts). Also on the bill were the Dominoes, Varetta Dillard and Danny Cobb.

The concert was held on March 21, 1952. More tickets were printed than the arena's actual capacity, in part due to counterfeiting and a printing error.

Accounts in the contemporary Cleveland newspapers indicate the event was scheduled to begin at 10 p.m.:

“The frustrated gathered outside, unable to buy a ticket at $1.75, their number increasing until it amounted to about 6,000” as estimated by Cleveland Police captain William Zimmerman. “About 9:30 they stormed the Arena, knocking down four panel doors, brushing police away and storming inside. Some two hours and 30 policemen later, Captain Zimmerman called it a night…. After ordering the ball ended, Capt. Zimmerman asked the crowd to leave. Police stood by as they slowly and reluctantly filed out.”

An alternative mythology of the event holds that an estimated 20,000 individuals tried to crowd into an arena that held slightly more than half that. Worries that a riot might break out caused fire authorities to shut down the concert after the first song by opening act Paul "Hucklebuck" Williams.

Journalist Valena Williams’ contemporary first-person report also confirms that the musical performances lasted at least into the evening's second act: “Paul Williams and his Hucklebuckers left the stage and Tiny Grimes and his Highlanders took over. I thought the acoustics were poor because I couldn’t hear the music. But then I realized that the din was drowning out the orchestra. I looked back at the dance floor and more than three-quarters of it was filled so tightly that you couldn’t see anything of the floor itself.” Williams described sharing her concerns about the boisterous crowd with promoter Lewis Platt, who “laughed”; she noted that “[W]hen the Arena bar was ordered shut down at 10:30 I knew the crowd was disturbing police authority, too.”

The “Coronation Ball” aspect of the event referred to scheduled intermission festivities, as Williams explained: “When I got home I was not surprised to hear the live broadcast from the Arena cut off the air. I learned later the dance had at that time been stopped. The midnight coronation of the two most popular teenagers was never held.”

Freed made a public apology on WJW the next day; also referring to the event as a "ball" or "dance," not as a "concert."

Williams’ eyewitness writeup includes her colorful descriptions of the youthful crowd, “most of them teensters.” Unlike the integrated audience drawn to Alan Freed's radio broadcasts featuring black rhythm-and-blues on Cleveland's airwaves and elsewhere, according to Williams the crowd at the Moondog Coronation Ball in Cleveland's Arena was “less than one per cent" white.

== Contemporary revival ==
Cleveland rock radio station WMMS (100.7 FM) attempted to stage a revival of the concert in 1986 under the name "Moondog Coronation Ball II". Then-program director John Gorman had intended for the event to serve as an oldies rock and roll tribute concert – part of the campaign to bring the Rock and Roll Hall of Fame to Cleveland. For legal reasons, the event never materialized. A few years later in 1992, Gorman, then at local oldies radio station WMJI (105.7 FM), successfully organized a 40th anniversary concert of oldies rock and roll acts called "Moondog Coronation Ball '92". The concert became an annual event, and was still being held annually as of 2014, in then-recent years at Rocket Arena.
