= The Flee-Rekkers =

British instrumental rock and roll band

Background information
- Also known as: The Fabulous Flee-Rakkers
- Origin: London, England
- Genres: Surf, rock and roll, instrumental rock
- Years active: 1959–1963
- Labels: Triumph, Top Rank, Pye, Piccadilly
- Past members: Peter Fleerakkers; Dave Cameron; Alan Monger; Elmy Durrant; Doug Henning; Micky Waller

The Flee-Rekkers – also known as The Fabulous Flee-Rakkers – were a British instrumental rock and roll band in the late 1950s and early 1960s. The group name varied on early singles; they were billed as "The Fabulous Flee-Rakkers" or "The Fabulous Flea-Rakkers" in early 1960, before settling on "The Flee-Rekkers" for all later releases. They were fronted by tenor saxophonist Peter Fleerakkers (or Fleerackers), and their records were produced by Joe Meek. Their biggest hit was "Green Jeans" in 1960.

== History ==
The group was influenced by saxophone-led bands like Johnny and the Hurricanes. They started under the names The Ramblers and The Statesiders (from February 1959), before taking a more permanent name derived from that of their leader Peter Fleerackers (tenor sax) (born Peter Luke Fleerackers, (Note: Sources give various spellings of his surname, but official birth records and his FIS obituary give this spelling. His father's surname was spelt Flierackers.) Brentford, 18 February 1934, died 21 December 2016), whose father was Dutch. Other members of the group were Dave 'Tex' Cameron (lead guitar) (born 21 October 1939, Ealing, West London, died July 2022), Alan Monger (rhythm guitar, baritone sax) (born 12 October 1939, Hackney, East London), Elmy Durrant (tenor sax) (born 24 March 1939, Edgware, Middlesex), Doug Henning (bass), and Mickey Waller (drums).

They were spotted playing at a The Hive Jive, The Putney Ballroom in Putney, South West London in late 1959, and successfully auditioned for record producer Joe Meek. He produced their first single, "Green Jeans", a rocked-up version of the traditional "Greensleeves" released on Meek's own label, Triumph Records, in early 1960. The record reached No. 23 on the UK Singles Chart, but demand outstripped Meek's capacity to supply copies. After the Triumph label collapsed, the record was reissued on the Top Rank label, which itself was then taken over by EMI. The group also featured on a single, "Hot Chick-A-Roo", by singer Ricky Wayne (born Learie Carasco), who became a prominent bodybuilder and, later, a noted writer and broadcaster in Saint Lucia.

The Flee-Rekkers released several more singles and an EP with less success, at first on the Pye label, and then on Piccadilly. According to the liner notes of their EP, they "were the first 'rock' group to be signed for a long term contract with Mecca after making appearances at their ballrooms up and down the country, and in the London area." They toured Britain extensively in the early 1960s, with a reputedly "wild" live act. Their final single in 1963, "Fireball", a version of the theme music to the animated TV series Fireball XL5, arranged by Tony Hatch, is regarded as one of their best.

The group broke up in August 1963. Fleerakkers played in various unsuccessful bands before leaving the music business in the late 1960s. Cameron, Monger and Durrant formed a new group, The Giants, who mainly performed in Germany. They played at The Top Ten Club, Hamburg, West Germany from October 1963 with new lead singer Tony Vincent (born 12 May 1941, London). They had already been joined by bassist Harry Kershaw (born 5 October 1944, Blackpool, Lancashire) and drummer Kenny Slade (born 27 May 1939, Canterbury, Kent).

Waller became a leading session drummer, playing with such musicians as Cyril Davies, Long John Baldry, Rod Stewart, Brian Auger, John Mayall and Jeff Beck; he died in 2008. Peter Fleerackers died in 2016, and Dave "Tex" Cameron in 2022.

A CD containing most of the group's recordings was issued by C-Five Records in 1991, and later in expanded versions by See For Miles Records and Castle Records.

== Discography ==
=== Singles ===
Date	Artist Credit	A-side	B-side	Label Info
Mar 1960	The Fabulous Flee-Rakkers	"Green Jeans"	"You Are My Sunshine"	Triumph RGM 1008
Apr 1960	Ricky Wayne and the Flee-Rakkers	"Chick A'Roo"	"Don't Pick on Me"	Triumph RGM 1009
Aug 1960	Fabulous Flea [sic] Rakkers	"Green Jeans"	"You Are My Sunshine"	Top Rank JAR 431
Aug 1960	Ricky Wayne and the Flee-Rakkers	"Hot Chick-A-Roo"	"Don't Pick on Me"	Top Rank JAR 432
Sep 1960	The Flee-Rekkers	"Sunday Date"	"Shiftless Sam"	Pye 7N 15288
Jan 1961	The Flee-Rekkers	"Blue Tango"	"Bitter Rice"	Pye 7N 15326
Jun 1961	The Flee-Rekkers	"Lone Rider"	"Miller Like Wow"	Piccadilly 7N 35006
May 1962	The Flee-Rekkers	"Stage to Cimarron"	"Twistin' the Chestnuts"	Piccadilly 7N 35048
Oct 1962	The Flee-Rekkers	"Sunburst"	"Black Buffalo"	Piccadilly 7N 35081
Feb 1963	The Flee-Rekkers	"Fireball" (From Fireball XL5)	"Fandango"	Piccadilly 7N 35109

=== Extended play ===
Date	Artist Credit	Tracks	Label Info
1961	The Flee-Rekkers (EP Title: The Fabulous Flee-Rekkers, credited to The Flee-Rekkers)	"Isle of Capri" "Brer Robert" "Hangover" "P.F.B"	Pye NEP 24141

=== Compilations ===
Year	Title	Label Info
1991	Joe Meek's Fabulous Flee-Rekkers	C-Five Records, C5CD 564
1997	Joe Meek's Fabulous Flee-Rekkers (re-issue)	See For Miles
2007	Green Jeans : The Anthology	Castle CMQDD 1457
