= Tony Grossi =

American newspaper writer (born 1957)

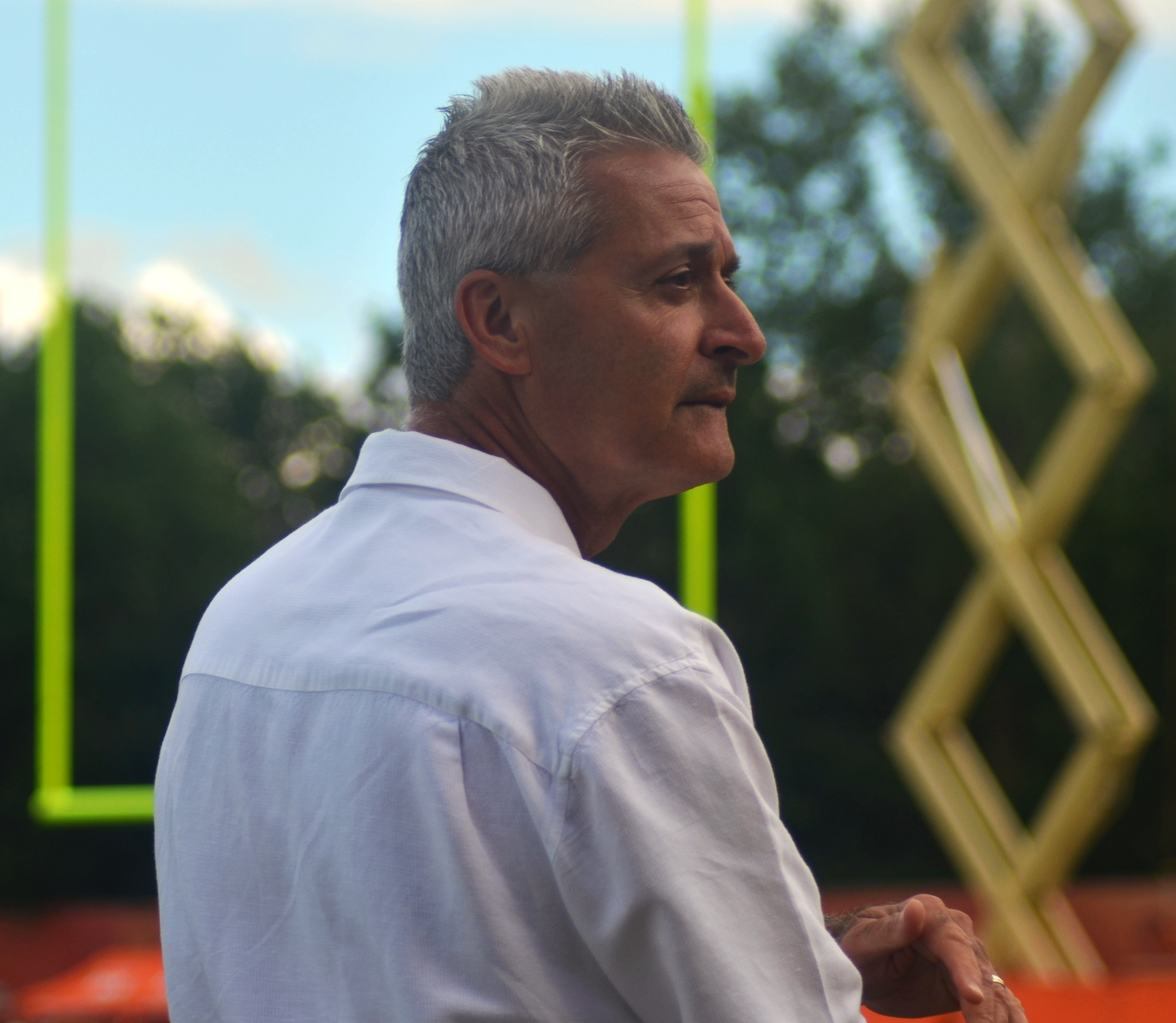
- Born: Anthony Grossi; 1957 (age 68–69); Cleveland, Ohio
- Occupations: Sportswriter; TV/radio host
- Awards: 1987 Ohio Sportswriter of the Year; 2007 AP Sportswriter Award
- Website: The Land On Demand.com (WKNR - ESPN Cleveland)

Anthony Grossi (born 1957 in Cleveland, Ohio) is a radio/TV personality, author, and former newspaper sportswriter who works as an on-air host and Cleveland Browns reporter/analyst for ESPN Cleveland (WKNR AM 850), as well as for regional sports network Bally Sports Great Lakes. Grossi also served as a member of the Pro Football Hall of Fame selection committee.

== Bio ==
Grossi was born and raised in the Cleveland area, and upon graduating high school in 1976, attended Ohio University, where he graduated in 1979 with a Bachelor of Science degree in journalism.

=== Plain Dealer ===
He then immediately after graduation began working for The Plain Dealer as a sports reporter. His big break came in 1981. Longtime Cleveland Indians beat reporter Terry Pluto was unable to cover the Indians' May 15 game against the Toronto Blue Jays, so the paper dispatched Grossi to Cleveland Stadium in Pluto's place. That night, Len Barker threw the ninth (now 10th) perfect game in major league history, and to date the last no-hitter thrown by an Indians/Guardians pitcher.

By 1984, Grossi became the paper's full-time Browns beat reporter. Grossi was recognized for his work in 1987, when he was named Ohio Sportswriter of the Year by the National Sportscasters and Sportswriters Association (NSSA) In 1994, Grossi was named to the Pro Football Hall of Fame Board of Selectors.

In 2004, Grossi would write his first book, titled Tales From the Browns Sideline, chronicling the history of the team as well as his own personal anecdotes from covering the Browns through the years.

In 2007, Grossi would join the then new regional cable sports network SportsTime Ohio (STO - now known as Bally Sports Great Lakes) as an analyst on Browns themed programming.

In his role as Browns beat reporter and NFL insider, Grossi's reports and columns contributed to the Plain Dealer becoming a three-time Ohio Associated Press Award winner for Best Daily Sports Section (2007, 2010, 2011 - Division V), as well as winning individual honors for Best Game Story in 2007.

==== Reassignment ====
In January 2012, Grossi - while discussing then Browns owner Randy Lerner's reclusive nature and lack of success with the Browns - tweeted that he viewed Lerner as "pathetic" and "the world's most irrelevant billionaire". Because of this, he was immediately removed from the Browns beat, and reassigned to other duties in the sports department. He would eventually quit the Plain Dealer on March 7.

=== WKNR ===
Five days after officially leaving the Plain Dealer, Grossi signed with sports radio station (and eventual Browns flagship) WKNR AM 850 to be their Browns beat reporter and analyst Along with this, Grossi continues in his role on SportsTime Ohio, and as part of the Pro Football Hall of Fame selection committee.

==== Suspension ====
On February 25, 2020, Grossi was suspended by WKNR after referring to Cleveland Browns quarterback Baker Mayfield as a "fucking midget" during a discussion regarding the team. The comment was made after an interview.

== Awards and honors ==
- 1987 Ohio Sportswriter of the Year (NSSA)
- 2007 Ohio Associated Press Sportswriting Award recipient - Best Game Story
