= Michael Cox (singer) =

British-born former pop singer and actor

- Also known as: Michael James
- Born: Michael James Cox; 19 March 1940 (age 86); Huyton, Liverpool, England
- Genres: Pop music
- Occupations: Singer, songwriter, actor
- Years active: 1959–1970s
- Labels: Decca, Triumph, Meteor, His Master's Voice, Pye, Parlophone

Michael James Cox (born 19 March 1940) is a British-born former pop singer and actor. As Michael Cox, he had a top-ten hit on the UK singles chart in 1960 with "Angela Jones", produced by Joe Meek. He later worked as an actor, and in TV in New Zealand, using both his full name and the name Michael James.

== Life and career ==
He was born in Huyton, Liverpool. After his four younger sisters wrote to ABC TV demanding that he be given a chance to audition for the pop show Oh Boy!, he was quickly signed up by producer Jack Good, and made his first appearance on the show in April 1959 singing Ricky Nelson's "Never Be Anyone Else But You". Good won him a recording deal with Decca Records, and his first single, "Teenage Love", was written by Marty Wilde and featured Joe Brown on guitar. However, neither it nor its follow-up "Too Hot To Handle" were hits.

Cox continued to appear on TV, in Good's new show Boy Meets Girls, and Good recommended him to record producer Joe Meek, who at the time was setting up his own label, Triumph. His first record for Triumph was "Angela Jones", a song written by John D. Loudermilk which was a hit in the US for Johnny Ferguson. Cox's version of the song, produced by Meek, rose to number 7 on the UK Singles Chart in June 1960. The Triumph label collapsed, and Cox's follow-up, the similar-sounding "Along Came Caroline", also produced by Meek and co-written by Geoff Stephens and Cox under the pseudonym Michael Steel, was released by the His Master's Voice label; it reached number 41 on the chart and was Cox's only other hit.

Cox was more successful in Scandinavia. His Stand up topped the Swedish best-selling charts for four weeks in January/February 1963. Cox successfully toured in Denmark and Sweden with a backing band, as well as in the UK, and continued to record under Meek's direction for several years. He released singles on the His Master's Voice, Pye and Parlophone labels, many of which featured leading session musicians such as guitarist Big Jim Sullivan. However, his later recordings were not hits and he gave up his recording career to attend drama school in the mid-1960s. In 1966, credited as Michael James Cox, he appeared in the movie Where the Bullets Fly, and he also acted in TV plays and commercials. In 1976, he appeared in the filmed version of the musical written by Roger Glover, The Butterfly Ball.

In the late 1970s, he began working on cruise ships, where he met his New Zealand-born wife. He started making appearances in the US, eventually emigrating there, before moving on to live in New Zealand. There, he continued to work on TV, credited as Michael James.

Compilations of Cox's recordings were issued on CD by Zircon Records in 1999, and Sequel Records in 2003.
