= Je'Rod Cherry =

American football player (born 1973)

No. 37, 30, 25
- Position: Safety

Personal information
- Born: May 30, 1973 (age 53); Charlotte, North Carolina, U.S.
- Listed height: 6 ft 1 in (1.85 m)
- Listed weight: 215 lb (98 kg)

Career information
- High school: Berkeley (Berkeley, California)
- College: California
- NFL draft: 1996: 2nd round, 40th overall pick

Career history
- New Orleans Saints (1996–1999); Oakland Raiders (2000)*; Philadelphia Eagles (2000); New England Patriots (2001–2004)
- * Offseason or practice squad member only

Awards and highlights
- 3× Super Bowl champion (XXXVI, XXXVIII, XXXIX)

Career NFL statistics
- Tackles: 131
- Sacks: 3
- Fumble recoveries: 2
- Passes defended: 4
- Stats at Pro Football Reference

Je'Rod LePatrick Cherry (born May 30, 1973) is an American former professional football player who was a safety in the National Football League (NFL) from 1996 to 2004. He played college football for the California Golden Bears. Cherry won three Super Bowls with the New England Patriots. After his football career, he became a radio talk show host for WKNR AM 850 in Cleveland, and sideline analyst/reporter for the Cleveland Browns Radio Network.

== Biography ==
Born in Charlotte, North Carolina, Cherry graduated from Berkeley High School at Berkeley, California in 1991 and was a standout athlete in football and track.

Cherry red-shirted his freshman year and played on the California Golden Bears football team from 1992 to 1995. In his senior season, Cherry had 91 tackles and an interception and returned 18 kickoffs for a 21.4 yard average. For his junior and senior years, Cherry was an All-Pac-10 honorable mention and Pac-10 All-Academic selection. With a 3.2 GPA, Cherry received his Bachelor of Arts degree in political science from UC Berkeley in 1996 and a Master of Arts in education from the University of California, Berkeley Graduate School of Education in 2000.

He was drafted by the New Orleans Saints in the 1996 NFL draft. In 2000, Cherry signed with the Oakland Raiders, then a month later he signed with the Philadelphia Eagles. After his stint with the Eagles, Cherry signed with the New England Patriots, where he earned Super Bowl rings in Super Bowls XXXVI, XXXVIII, and XXXIX as a special teams player before retiring in 2004.

Cherry made an immediate impact for the Patriots on special teams in 2001 and 2002. In 2001, he tied for 3rd in ST tackles with 12 and led the Patriots with 6 ST tackles during their Super Bowl run in the postseason. In 2002, he again ranked 3rd in ST tackles with 12 during the regular season. During the 2003 regular season, he finished with 13 ST tackles and recorded 1 ST tackle in the Super Bowl against Carolina. In 2004, Cherry again recorded 13 ST tackles and had 2 ST tackles against Pittsburgh in the AFC Championship Game.

== NFL career statistics ==
Legend
	Won the Super Bowl
**Bold**	Career high

=== Regular season ===
Year	Team	Games		Tackles				Interceptions				Fumbles			
Year	Team	GP	GS	Comb	Solo	Ast	Sck	Int	Yds	TD	Lng	FF	FR	Yds	TD
1996	NOR	13	0	8	6	2	0.0	0	0	0	0	0	**1**	0	0
1997	NOR	16	0	6	6	0	0.0	0	0	0	0	0	0	0	0
1998	NOR	14	0	27	23	**4**	**2.0**	0	0	0	0	0	0	0	0
1999	NOR	16	0	**28**	**26**	2	0.0	0	0	0	0	0	0	0	0
2000	PHI	13	0	7	7	0	0.0	0	0	0	0	0	**1**	0	0
2001	NWE	16	0	15	11	**4**	0.0	0	0	0	0	0	0	0	0
2002	NWE	16	0	13	9	**4**	0.0	0	0	0	0	0	0	0	0
2003	NWE	11	0	16	15	1	1.0	0	0	0	0	0	0	0	0
2004	NWE	12	0	11	9	2	0.0	0	0	0	0	0	0	0	0
		127	0	131	112	19	3.0	0	0	0	0	0	2	0	0

=== Playoffs ===
Year	Team	Games		Tackles				Interceptions				Fumbles			
Year	Team	GP	GS	Comb	Solo	Ast	Sck	Int	Yds	TD	Lng	FF	FR	Yds	TD
2000	PHI	2	0	0	0	0	0.0	0	0	0	0	0	0	0	0
2001	NWE	3	0	4	2	**2**	0.0	0	0	0	0	0	0	0	0
2003	NWE	3	0	2	2	0	0.0	0	0	0	0	0	0	0	0
2004	NWE	3	0	**5**	**4**	1	0.0	0	0	0	0	0	0	0	0
		11	0	11	8	3	0.0	0	0	0	0	0	0	0	0

== Post-NFL career ==
After his retirement, Cherry moved to Macedonia, Ohio, and in 2009 became a talk show host and NFL analyst for WKNR AM 850 in Cleveland. In 2013, following WKNR becoming a flagship station for the Cleveland Browns, Cherry also became a game-day pregame host for the Browns radio network. In 2022, he became part of the main game broadcast team as sideline analyst and reporter.

Cherry is a Christian and attends Bible studies with other players. Each year, Cherry goes to Heartland Community Church in Medina, Ohio, where he discusses his work as a sports analyst and his spiritual journey with the congregation there. In 2008, Cherry raffled off his first Super Bowl ring with the proceeds going to charity. The event raised over $200,000. The ring is currently with a collector in Ottawa, Ontario, Canada.

== Awards and honors ==
- Two-time All Pac-10 Academic Team - 1994, 1995
- Three-time Super Bowl winner - XXXVI, XXXVIII, XXXIX (as a member of the New England Patriots)
