= Leo Mintz =

American rock and roll promoter

Leo M. Mintz
- Born: 10 October 1911; Cleveland, Ohio, United States
- Died: 4 November 1976 (aged 65); Cleveland, Ohio, US
- Occupations: record store owner, music promoter
- Known for: Key role in naming and marketing early rock and roll

Leo M. Mintz (10 October 1911 – 4 November 1976) was a record store owner in Cleveland, Ohio, United States, who was instrumental in the early establishment, marketing and promotion of rock and roll music.

He was born in Cleveland. In 1938, while working as assistant manager at an army surplus store, he decided to set up a record shop, Record Rendezvous, on Prospect Avenue in Cleveland, on the edge of the city's black community. Initially, this sold used jukebox records, which Mintz purchased through regular visits to a warehouse in Columbus. At the store, he was among the first to put records in boxes which customers could browse through, rather than having to ask for songs by name. He also provided listening booths so that customers could hear the records before purchasing them, and encouraged in-store promotional appearances by recording artists. The store became known as the "'Vous".

By about 1950, Mintz noticed an increase in the number of white teenagers sifting through his racks, listening and dancing to rhythm and blues records, such as those by Ruth Brown, Wynonie Harris and Fats Domino, which had been marketed to African Americans. However, they rarely purchased them because of the stigma attached by some to "race records". He persuaded radio presenter Alan Freed to play the records, initially as novelties on WAKR-AM in Akron, and then in 1951 on a new radio show which Mintz helped him to secure at WJW-AM in Cleveland.

Mintz sponsored Freed's radio programme, The Moondog Show, and supplied many of the records played. Several sources claim that Mintz, rather than Freed as is usually suggested, was the first to use the term "rock and roll" - a phrase quite commonly used in the records - to describe the music and, in particular, to promote it to white audiences. According to one source, one night while he was on air, Freed turned to Mintz and said, "Leo, this music is so exciting, we’ve got to call it something." Mintz replied, "Alan, you are rolling tonight...you're rocking and rolling...call it 'rock and roll.'" Mintz also sponsored Freed's Moondog Coronation Ball in March 1952, often regarded as the first rock'n'roll concert.

Freed left Cleveland for New York in 1954. Mintz expanded the chain of Record Rendezvous stores to five by the 1960s, and continued to operate them until a few months before his death in 1976. Afterwards his son Stuart Mintz took over his stores.
