= Triumph Records (United Kingdom) =

United Kingdom record label

Triumph Records was a UK record label set up in January 1960 by Joe Meek and William Barrington-Coupe with the financial backing of Major Wilfred Alonzo Banks. The label existed for less than a year and although most of the artistes are unknown, many of the records now sell for high prices in the record collecting world because of Meek's involvement. Even the original paper sleeves command some value.

The label had three hit singles—"Angela Jones" by Michael Cox reaching number 7 in the UK Singles Chart, "Green Jeans" by the Flee-Rekkers peaking at #23 and George Chakiris' "Heart of a Teenage Girl" at #49—but distribution was badly organised and Meek pulled out in June 1960. The label folded soon afterwards after a bankruptcy petition was filed on behalf of a leading musical arranger who had not been paid. A few 45 r.p.m. records were released on Triumph that had no involvement from Meek. Many of Meek's later 1960–1961 Triumph recordings by artists including John Leyton, the Flee-Rekkers and Iain Gregory were recorded for Triumph release, but were issued on labels such as Top Rank and Pye after the label's collapse.

== Discography ==
=== 45rpm records by catalogue number ===
- RGM1000 – "Just Too Late" / "Friendship" – Peter Jay and the Blue Men
- RGM1001 – "Magic Wheel" – "Rodd-Ken The Cavaliers" / "Happy Valley" – Rodd & the Cavaliers
- RGM1002 – "Let's Go See Grandma" / "Believe Me" – Joy & Dave
- RGM1003-6 were unused
- RGM1007 – "With This Kiss" / "Don't Tell Me Not To Love You" – Yolanda
- RGM1008 – "Green Jeans" / "You Are My Sunshine" – The Flee-Rekkers – UK #23
- RGM1009 – "Hot Chick'Aroo" / "Don't Pick on Me" – Ricky Wayne
- RGM1010 – "Heart of a Teenage Girl" / "I'm Always Chasing Rainbows" – George Chakiris – UK #49
- RGM1011 – "Angela Jones" / "Don't Want To Know" – Michael Cox – UK #7
- RGM1012 – "The Boy with the Eyes of Blue" / "I Gave Him Back His Ring" – Carol Jones
- RGM1013 – "Lover and His Lass" / "Lonesome Traveller" – Charles Blackwell
- RGM1022 – "T'aint What You Do" / "Out There" – Don Fox
- RGM1023 – "Chicken Sax" / "Snake Eyes" – Rex & the Minors
- RGM1024 – "Ricky" / "Dear Daddy" – Pat Reader
- RGM1027 – "My Charlie" / "Tell Me" – Barbara Lyon
- RGM1030 – "Tell Tommy I Miss Him" / "I'm Sending Back Your Roses" – Laura Lee

=== Extended play 7" records ===
- RGXST5000 – "I Hear A New World Part 1" – The Blue Men
- RGXST5001 – "I Hear A New World Part 2" – The Blue Men (not released, sleeves only exist)
- RGJ7002/Saga TSTP1041 – Stravinsky: Dumbarton Oaks Concerto – Haydn Orchestra

=== Long play 12" records ===
- RGXST9000 – I Hear A New World – The Blue Men (not officially released, was pressed in limited white label promo format. Also slated for issue on 5" stereo reel-to-reel tape, but only one demonstration copy has ever been seen).

== See also ==
- Category:British independent record labels
- List of record labels
- Triumph Records (United States)
