= Bruce Drennan =

American sportscaster (born 1950)

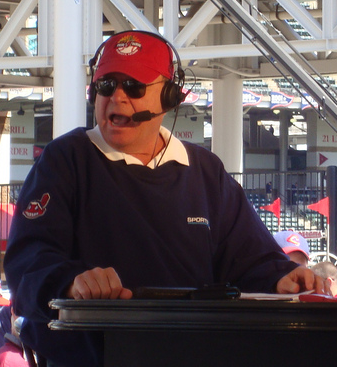
- Born: May 1, 1950 (age 76); Chicago, Illinois, United States
- Occupation: Sportscaster

Bruce Drennan (born May 1, 1950, in Chicago, Illinois) is an American sportscaster based in Cleveland, Ohio.

A former Major League Baseball (MLB) announcer, National Basketball Association (NBA) announcer, and sports radio personality, Drennan hosted sports talk shows on WTAM, WKNR and Bally Sports Great Lakes throughout his career in Cleveland.

== Broadcast career ==
During the early 1970s, he had been an evening sports talk show host on WMRO 1280 in Aurora, Illinois. Drennan first emerged on the Cleveland airwaves as an afternoon sports talk show host on WBBG AM 1260.

His opinionated "tell it like it is" style made such an impression that he was hired as a color analyst for Cleveland Indians television broadcasts. Drennan held this position from 1980 to 1982. During this same period, Drennan also called the play by play of Cleveland Cavaliers basketball games on WUAB channel 43, working with former Cavaliers star Austin Carr.

After being replaced on the Indians telecasts, Drennan was hired by WHK AM 1420 in Cleveland to host a sports talk show.

In 1984, Drennan was hired by WWWE AM 1100 as morning drive sports anchor and weekend talk show host. In the late 1980s, he took over WWWE's long running Sportsline evening sports talk show, replacing Pete Franklin. Throughout the 1990s, Drennan worked on and off for WWWE (which in 1996 became WTAM) as a morning sports anchor, and towards the end of the decade returning to the evening slot to host Sportsline.

In 2001, Bruce moved to WKNR AM 850 to host the station's morning drive sports talk program.

=== Arrest ===
In September 2004, Drennan's home in Strongsville, Ohio was raided by FBI and IRS agents as part of a sports-gambling investigation. He subsequently lost his job at WKNR because of the investigation and served as host on an online radio station.

In April 2006, Drennan was charged with two counts of filing false tax returns. He later agreed to a plea bargain and served five months in federal prison.

=== Comeback ===
In 2007, after his release from jail, Drennan returned to broadcasting as the host of the sports talk show All Bets Are Off With Bruce Drennan (renamed Drennan Live in 2014) on SportsTime Ohio, which he hosted until 2021. Bruce now does a weekly show for the BIGPLAY Network called Bonus Time with Drennan. In 2022, Drennan returned to WKNR to host a weekend show.

== Signature Calls and Catch Phrases ==
- I Love Ya Cleveland! - what he opens and closes each sports talk show he hosts with.
- Ducks on the pond - when the bases are loaded in a baseball game

== Awards ==
- Two-time winner - Best Cleveland Sportscaster (Cleveland Press Club - 1997, 1998)
- 1999 inductee - Ohio Broadcasters Hall of Fame
