= Triumph Records (United States) =

Former record label

Triumph Records was an American record label, founded in 1958 when Herb Abramson left Atlantic Records, but the label only existed for a short time. By 1960, Abramson formed Triumph-Blaze Productions to produce recordings for distribution by other labels.

== See also ==
- List of record labels
- Triumph Records (UK)
