= Paul Williams (saxophonist) =

American saxophonist and bandleader (1915–2002)

- Born: July 13, 1915; Lewisburg, Tennessee, U.S.
- Died: September 14, 2002 (aged 87) New York City, U.S.
- Genres: Jazz, R&B, jump blues
- Occupation: Musician
- Instrument: Saxophone
- Years active: 1930s–1960s
- Labels: Savoy, Atlantic
- Website: paulhucklebuckwilliams.com

Paul "Hucklebuck" Williams (July 13, 1915 – September 14, 2002) was an American jazz and blues saxophonist, bandleader, and songwriter. His record "The Huckle-Buck", recorded in December 1948, was one of the most successful R&B records of the time. In his Honkers and Shouters, Arnold Shaw credited Williams as one of the first to employ the honking tenor saxophone solo that became the hallmark of rhythm and blues and rock and roll in the 1950s and early 1960s.

== Biography ==
Williams was born in Lewisburg, Tennessee, and grew up in Bowling Green, Kentucky, before moving with his parents to Detroit, Michigan, at the age of 13. He started learning saxophone and played in school bands before forming his own band, Paul Williams and his Kings of Rhythm, with the trumpeter Lloyd Henderson, in the mid-1930s, and playing in local clubs. The band split up during World War II, and Williams then joined Clarence Dorsey's band. He toured with the band, then known as the Sensational Six, until 1945, when he left to join another local band, led by King Porter (born James A. Pope, 1916–1983).

Williams became known for his showmanship in Porter's band. He made his first recordings with Porter for the Paradise label in 1947. He attracted the attention of the agent and record producer Teddy Reig and, under Reig's tutelage, formed his own band. Credited as the Paul Williams Sextette, they recorded in Detroit for Savoy Records in September 1947, and "Thirty-Five Thirty" (named for Joe Von Battle's record shop at 3530 Hastings Street) reached number 8 on the Billboard R&B chart (then called the race records chart) in early 1948. Williams followed up its success with three further chart hits released in 1948 – "The Twister" (which, according to Joel Whitburn, "had a 'rockin' beat" and "laid the foundation for Hank Ballard's 'The Twist'"); "Waxie Maxie"; and "Walkin' Around" – all featuring the honking tenor sax of Wild Bill Moore.

Williams and his band toured nationally, and his concerts became increasingly popular and riotous. Reig claimed that he taught Williams to perform vigorously, "kicking as he played, bending and dipping, getting down on the floor while blowing that saxophone." At a rehearsal for a concert, either in Newark or Baltimore, he heard Lucky Millinder and his band playing a tune, originally known as "D'Natural Blues", written for Millinder by Andy Gibson. The composition was strongly influenced by "Now's the Time", recorded by Charlie Parker for Savoy Records at a 1945 session produced by Reig. Williams began performing Gibson's composition, and at a show in Devon, Pennsylvania, noticed that audience members were performing a new dance, the Hucklebuck, to it. Williams renamed the tune "The Huckle-Buck", and his recording, made in December 1948 with Reig producing, rapidly rose to the top of the R&B chart. It reached number 1 in March 1949 and stayed in that position for 14 weeks, spending a total of 32 weeks on the chart. It reportedly sold half a million copies and broke sales records.

"The Huckle-Buck" established Williams's popularity, and he was billed as Paul "Hucklebuck" Williams for the rest of his career. He had three more R&B chart successes in 1949 – "House Rocker", "He Knows How to Hucklebuck", and "Pop-Corn" – but these failed to match the earlier record's success. However, his band continued to be popular. The band played on many of Amos Milburn's recordings. With Tiny Grimes, Williams co-headlined the first Moondog Coronation Ball, promoted by Alan Freed in Cleveland on March 21, 1952, often claimed to be the first rock and roll concert, and was the only act to perform before the show was abandoned because of the size of the crowd. He also played on many of the nationwide concert tours organised by Freed.

Williams left Savoy Records in 1952 and recorded for several labels thereafter. Band members during the 1950s included Moore, Noble "Thin Man" Watts, the trumpeter Phil Guilbeau, and the singers Danny Cobb, Jumpin' Jimmy Brown, Joan Shaw and Connie Allen. Williams worked in the Atlantic Records house band, backing singers including Ruth Brown, and performed with musicians including Elmore James and Dave "Baby" Cortez. He was the musical director for Lloyd Price and James Brown in the early 1960s and performed with Otis Redding and Tommy Tucker. He worked as a session musician in New York City before setting up a booking agency in 1968. In 1986, he appeared at a Smithsonian symposium on rhythm and blues at the National Museum of American History. He received the Rhythm and Blues Foundation Pioneer Award in 1992.

Williams died in September 2002, in New York City, at the age of 87.

== Discography ==
=== Albums ===
- Paul Williams and His Orchestra featuring Noble Watts – the Hucklebuck (Saxophonograph, 1981)
- The Complete Recordings Volume 1 1947–1949 (Blue Moon, 1999)
- The Complete Recordings 1949–1952 – Volume 2 (Blue Moon, 1999)
- The Complete Recordings 1952–1956 – Volume 3 (Blue Moon, 2001)

With Ruth Brown

- Ruth Brown (Atlantic, 1957)

=== Singles ===
- "Hastings St. Bounce" / "Way Late" (Savoy 459, 1947)
- "Thirty-Five Thirty" / "Come with Me Baby" (Savoy 661, 1948)
- "Bouncing with Benson" / "Boogie Ride" (Savoy 664, 1948)
- "The Twister, Part 1" / "Part 2" (Savoy 665, 1948)
- "Waxie Maxie" / "Spider Sent Me" (Savoy 670, 1948)
- "Bouncing with Buddy, Part 1" / "Part 2" (Savoy 674, 1948)
- "Walkin' Around" / (Savoy 680, 1949)
- "The Huckle-Buck" / "Hoppin' John" (Savoy 683, 1949)
- "House Rocker" / "He Knows How to Hucklebuck" (Savoy 702, 1949)
- "Pop-Corn" / "Free Dice" (Savoy 711, 1949)
- "Cranberries" / "Juice Bug Boogie" (Savoy 721, 1949)
- "What's Happening" / "Camp Meeting Bounce" (Savoy 734, 1950)
- "Rye Boogie" / "Weasel Swing" (Savoy 751, 1950)
- "Jeep's Blues" / "Paul's Boogie" (Savoy 758, 1951)
- "Turtle Rock" / "Blues at Daybreak" (Savoy 773, 1952)
- "Rockin' Chair Blues" / "Sinners' Hop, Part 1" (Savoy 814, 1952)
- "Blowin' the Boogie" / "It's All Over Baby" (Savoy 831, 1952)
- "I Need Your Love" / "I'm So Happy" (Savoy 841, 1952)
- "Hello" / "Rock It Davy Crockett" (Capitol F3205, 1955)
- "You're Breaking My Heart No More" / "It's Over" (Capitol F3255, 1955)
- "Give It Up" / "Pass the Buck" (Vee Jay VJ234, 1957)
- "Walkin' the Track" / "Back to Back" (7 Arts S713, 1961)
- "I Don't Want to Set the World on Fire" / "I Can't Stand It" (Ascot AS2114, 1962)
