= Bronski Beat discography =

- Studio albums: 4
- Live albums: 1
- Compilation albums: 8
- Singles: 21
- Video albums: 2
- Music videos: 7
- Remix albums: 2
- Other appearances: 3

The discography of the British pop music group Bronski Beat contains albums, singles, and videos. They were a synthpop trio which achieved success in the mid-1980s.

== Albums ==
=== Studio albums ===
Title	Album details	Peak chart positions										Certifications
Title	Album details	UK	AUS	AUT	CAN	GER	IT	NL	NZ	SWI	US	Certifications
The Age of Consent	Released: 15 October 1984; Label: Forbidden Fruit/London; Formats: CD, LP, MC	4	12	—	7	10	14	4	5	7	36	UK: Platinum; CAN: Platinum; FRA: Gold; GER: Gold; NL: Gold; NZ: Platinum
Truthdare Doubledare	Released: 28 April 1986; Label: Forbidden Fruit/London; Formats: CD, LP, MC	18	35	20	—	21	—	—	35	9	147	
Rainbow Nation	Released: 13 February 1995; Label: ZYX Music; Formats: CD, MC	—	—	—	—	—	—	—	—	—	—	
The Age of Reason	Released: 28 July 2017; Label: Strike Force Entertainment; Formats: 2×CD, digital download; Largely consists of reworkings of their debut album	—	—	—	—	—	—	—	—	—	—	
"—" denotes releases that did not chart or were not released in that territory.

=== Live albums ===
Title	Album details
In Concert–351	Released: 25 March 1985; Label: BBC Transcription Services; Formats: LP; Archive concert of Bronski Beat from 29 November 1984 at the Hammersmith Odeon (on LP released as part of The BBC in Concert Series, split with a concert by Aztec Camera).

=== Remix albums ===
Title	Album details	Peak chart positions		Certifications
Title	Album details	UK	US Dance	Certifications
Hundreds & Thousands	Released: September 1985; Label: Forbidden Fruit/London; Formats: CD, LP, MC	24	18 (Note: In the US, Hundreds & Thousands charted as an EP.)	UK: Silver
The Age of Remix	Released: 30 March 2018; Label: Strike Force Entertainment; Formats: 3×CD, digital download	—	—	
"—" denotes releases that did not chart or were not released in that territory.

=== Compilation albums ===
Title	Album details	Peak chart positions								Certifications
Title	Album details	UK	AUS	AUT	GER	IT	NL	NZ	SWI	Certifications
The Singles Collection 1984/1990 (with Jimmy Somerville and the Communards)	Released: 12 November 1990; Label: London; Formats: CD, LP, MC	4	114	10	4	12	6	30	4	
Master Series (with Jimmy Somerville and the Communards)	Released: 1996; Label: London; Formats: CD, LP, MC	—	—	—	—	—	—	—	—	
The Very Best of Jimmy Somerville, Bronski Beat and The Communards	Released: 10 September 2001; Label: Warner/London; Formats: CD	29	—	—	49	—	—	—	—	UK: Gold
The Essentials (with Jimmy Somerville and the Communards)	Released: 2 April 2002; Label: Warner; Formats: CD	—	—	—	—	—	—	—	—	
Het Beste van the Communards (with Jimmy Somerville and the Communards)	Released: 2005; Label: Warner Music Benelux; Formats: CD	—	—	—	—	—	—	—	—	
For a Friend: The Best of Bronski Beat, The Communards & Jimmy Somerville	Released: 15 June 2009; Label: Music Club Deluxe; Formats: 2×CD	—	—	—	—	—	—	—	—	
Dance & Desire: Rarities & Videos (with Jimmy Somerville and the Communards)	Released: 17 November 2014; Label: Edsel; Formats: 2×CD+DVD	—	—	—	—	—	—	—	—	
The Best Of	Released: 2018; Label: SAIFAM; Formats: LP	—	—	—	—	—	—	—	—	
"—" denotes releases that did not chart or were not released in that territory.

== Singles ==
=== As lead artist ===
Title	Year	Peak chart positions										Certifications	Album
Title	Year	UK	AUS	GER	IRE	IT	NL	NZ	SWI	US	US Dance	Certifications	Album
"Smalltown Boy"	1984	3	8	3	4	1	1	5	2	48	1	UK: 2× Platinum; CAN: Gold; IT: Gold	The Age of Consent
"Why?"	1984	6	10	5	6	5	6	11	7	—	27	UK: Silver	The Age of Consent
"It Ain't Necessarily So"	1984	16	58	31	26	28	21	27	—	—	—		The Age of Consent
"I Feel Love (Medley)" (with Marc Almond)	1985	3	34	16	3	—	11	—	23	—	—	UK: Silver	Hundreds & Thousands
"Hit That Perfect Beat"	1985	3	3	4	5	5	19	—	3	—	7	UK: Silver	Truthdare Doubledare
"C'mon! C'mon!"	1986	20	27	32	9	40	—	31	—	—	17		Truthdare Doubledare
"I'm Gonna Run Away from You"	1990	—	—	—	—	—	—	—	—	—	—		Non-album singles
"One More Chance"	1991	—	—	—	—	—	—	—	—	—	—		Non-album singles
"Why ???" (remixes; Germany-only release)	1993	—	—	—	—	—	—	—	—	—	—		Non-album singles
"Smalltown Boy" (1994 remix)	1994	—	—	—	—	22	—	—	—	—	—		Non-album singles
"Why" (1995 remix; Italy-only release)	1995	—	—	—	—	—	—	—	—	—	—		Rainbow Nation
"I Luv the Nightlife" (Italy-only release)	1995	—	—	—	—	—	—	—	—	—	—		Rainbow Nation
"Kickin' Up the Rain" (Germany-only release)	1995	—	—	—	—	—	—	—	—	—	—		Rainbow Nation
"Smalltown Boy" (feat. Lorie Madison; Italy-only release)	2004	—	—	—	—	—	—	—	—	—	—		Non-album single
"A Flower for Dandara" (feat. Rose McDowall)	2017	—	—	—	—	—	—	—	—	—	—		The Age of Reason
"Smalltown Boy 2k18" (Part One)	2018	—	—	—	—	—	—	—	—	—	—		The Age of Remix
"Smalltown Boy 2k18" (Part Two)	2018	—	—	—	—	—	—	—	—	—	—		The Age of Remix
"—" denotes releases that did not chart or were not released in that territory.

=== As featured artist ===
Title	Year	Peak chart positions				Album
Title	Year	UK	GER	IRE	NL	Album
"Heroes" (with Suzi Quatro and various artists as the County Line)	1986	—	—	—	—	Non-album single (Note: Charity single for Children in Need.)
"Cha Cha Heels" (with Eartha Kitt)	1989	32	—	22	—	I'm Still Here (by Kitt)
"Smalltown Boy" (1991 remix; with Jimmy Somerville)	1991	32	28	16	72	The Singles Collection 1984/1990
"—" denotes releases that did not chart or were not released in that territory.

=== Promotional singles ===
Title	Year	Notes
"Run from Love"	1985	Originally a DJ-only single, released as support of the Hundreds & Thousands album
"Hard Rain	1985	B-side of "Run from Love" promo single, also issued in the UK as the lead track of four track promotional EP NME Readers' Poll Winners '84 by NME
"This Heart"	1986	Unreleased single from Truthdare Doubledare that was only released promotionally

=== Other appearances ===
Title	Year	Notes
"That Perfect Medley"	1987	Appears on Razormaid – Special Collector's Edition, released in the US
"My Discarded Men" (with Eartha Kitt)	1989	B-side of "Cha Cha Heels", appears on Kitt's album I'm Still Here
"I Want Your Body"	1993	B-side of the "Why ???" remix from 1993

== Videos ==
=== Video albums ===
Title	Album details
The First Chapter	Released: March 1986; Label: Channel 5; Formats: VHS, LD
The Video Collection 1984/1990 (with Jimmy Somerville and the Communards)	Released: November 1990; Label: London/PolyGram Video; Formats: VHS

=== Music videos ===
Title	Year	Director
"Smalltown Boy"	1984	Bernard Rose
"Why?"	1984	Bernard Rose
"It Ain't Necessarily So"	1984	Simon Milne
"I Feel Love (Medley)"	1985	Constantine Giannaris
"Hit That Perfect Beat"	1986	Ralph Ziman
"C'mon! C'mon!"	1986	Tim Pope
"Cha Cha Heels"	1989	Unknown

== See also ==
- List of number-one dance hits (United States)
- The Communards discography
- Jimmy Somerville discography
