= For a Friend: The Best Of =

Greatest hits album by Jimmy Somerville featuring Bronski Beat & The Communards
- Released: June 2009
- Label: Music Club Deluxe

For a Friend: The Best Of is a 34-track, double disc greatest hits compilation and career retrospective by Jimmy Somerville, featuring his work as a solo artist, as well as with Bronski Beat and The Communards.

The compilation was released in 2009, and spans twenty five years of Somerville's career. It begins with Bronski Beat's 1984 hit "Smalltown Boy", and concludes with tracks from Somerville's 2009 album Suddenly Last Summer, which features stripped down covers of songs Somerville considered formative. It includes ten UK top twenty hits including "Smalltown Boy" (Bronski Beat: UK #3, 1984), "Don't Leave Me This Way" (The Communards: UK #1, 1986), and "You Make Me Feel (Mighty Real)" (Jimmy Somerville: UK #5, 1989).

== Track listing ==
=== Disc 1 ===
	Title	Performer	Writers	Original Artist
1.	"Smalltown Boy"	Bronski Beat	Steve Bronski, Larry Steinbachek, Jimmy Somerville	
2.	"Why?"	Bronski Beat	Bronski, Steinbachek, Somerville	
3.	"It Ain't Necessarily So"	Bronski Beat	George Gershwin, Ira Gershwin, Dorothy Heyward, DuBose Heyward	From Porgy and Bess
4.	"I Feel Love/Johnny Remember Me (Medley)"	Bronski Beat: Featuring Marc Almond	Geoff Goddard, Giorgio Moroder, Pete Bellotte, Donna Summer	Donna Summer ("I Feel Love"); John Leyton and The Outlaws ("Johnny Remember Me")
5.	"Screaming"	Bronski Beat	Bronski, Steinbachek, Somerville	
6.	"Run from Love" (Remix version from Hundreds & Thousands)	Bronski Beat	Bronski, Steinbachek, Somerville	
7.	"Hard Rain" (Remix version from Hundreds & Thousands)	Bronski Beat	Bronski, Steinbachek, Somerville	
8.	"Don't Leave Me This Way"	The Communards: Featuring Sarah Jane Morris	Kenneth Gamble, Leon Huff, Cary Gilbert	Harold Melvin & the Blue Notes (1975); Thelma Houston (1976)
9.	"La Dolorosa"	The Communards	Richard Coles, Somerville	
10.	"Disenchanted"	The Communards	Coles, Somerville	
11.	"So Cold the Night"	The Communards	Coles, Somerville	
12.	"You Are My World"	The Communards	Coles, Somerville	
13.	"Forbidden Love"	The Communards	Coles, Somerville	
14.	"Breadline Britain"	The Communards	Coles, Somerville	
15.	"Tomorrow"	The Communards	Coles, Somerville	
16.	"There's More to Love (Than Boy Meets Girl)"	The Communards	Coles, Somerville	

=== Disc 2 ===
	Title	Performer	Writers	Original Artist
1.	"Victims"	The Communards	Coles, Somerville	
2.	"For a Friend"	The Communards	Coles, Somerville	
3.	"Never Can Say Goodbye"	The Communards	Clifton Davis	The Jackson 5 (1971); Gloria Gaynor (1974)
4.	"Comment te dire adieu?"	Jimmy Somerville: Featuring June Miles-Kingston	Serge Gainsbourg, Arnold Goland, Jack Gold	Françoise Hardy
5.	"You Make Me Feel (Mighty Real)"	Jimmy Somerville	James Wirrick, Sylvester James	Sylvester (Sylvester James)
6.	"Read My Lips (Enough Is Enough)"	Jimmy Somerville	Somerville	
7.	"Heartbeat"	Jimmy Somerville	Matt Rowe, Somerville, Richard Stannard	
8.	"By Your Side"	Jimmy Somerville	Rowe, Somerville, Stannard	
9.	"Safe" (Todd Terry Short Session)	Jimmy Somerville	Gary Butcher, Somerville	
10.	"To Love Somebody"	Jimmy Somerville	Barry Gibb, Robin Gibb	Bee Gees
11.	"Lay Down"	Jimmy Somerville	Gainsbourg, Sally Herbert, Somerville	Samples Serge Gainsbourg's "Contact"
12.	"Dark Sky"	Jimmy Somerville	Herbert, Somerville	
13.	"Something To Live For" (Sounds of Life Mix)	Jimmy Somerville	Herbert, Ed Monaghan, Somerville	
14.	"Can't Take My Eyes Off You"	Jimmy Somerville	Bob Crewe, Bob Gaudio	Frankie Valli
15.	"Come On"	Jimmy Somerville	Sunniva Greeve, Peter Plate, Somerville, Ulf Leo Sommer	
16.	"Could It Be Love?"	Jimmy Somerville	Felix Gauder, Milan Sajé, Somerville	
17.	"Sweet Unknown"	Jimmy Somerville	Alison Shaw, Jim Shaw	Cranes
18.	"People Are Strange"	Jimmy Somerville	John Paul Densmore, Robbie Krieger, Ray Manzarek, Jim Morrison	The Doors

== Charts ==
=== Weekly charts ===
Chart (2012)	Peak position
UK Independent Albums Chart (OCC)	14
UK Albums Chart (OCC)	160
