= Aristotle and Dante Discover the Secrets of the Universe (soundtrack) =

Aristotle and Dante Discover the Secrets of the Universe (Original Motion Picture Soundtrack)

Film score by Isabella Summers
- Released: September 8, 2023
- Recorded: 2022–2023
- Genre: Film score
- Length: 34:22
- Producer: Isabella Summers

Isabella Summers chronology
Strange Planet (2023)	Aristotle and Dante Discover the Secrets of the Universe (2023)	Wild Sea (2023)

Aristotle and Dante Discover the Secrets of the Universe (Original Motion Picture Soundtrack) is the film score soundtrack to the 2022 film Aristotle and Dante Discover the Secrets of the Universe. The film score was composed by Isabella Summers and was self-released on September 8, 2023, the same day as the film's release.

== Background ==
In August 2022, it was announced that Isabella Summers of Florence and the Machine band would compose for Aristotle and Dante Discover the Secrets of the Universe. The film's music supervisor Adam Bennati contacted Summers to score the film, with Aitch Alberto being a fan of her work. Alberto noted that Summers had a real understanding of what he wanted to achieve. She wanted to create a soft visual tone while reflecting Aristotle's internal struggle through the score, which was considered a big challenge, as it was an internalized experience being related to queer people, and the music was important to reflect his mind.

== Release ==
The soundtrack was self-released by Isabella Summers on September 8, 2023, the same day as the film. The album accompanied eighteen tracks with each track having the title "True Love".

== Track listing ==
No.	Title	Length
1.	"True Love, Pt.1"	0:41
2.	"True Love, Pt.2"	2:21
3.	"True Love, Pt.3"	1:30
4.	"True Love, Pt.4"	0:48
5.	"True Love, Pt.5"	0:51
6.	"True Love, Pt.6"	2:12
7.	"True Love, Pt.7"	1:26
8.	"True Love, Pt.8"	3:26
9.	"True Love, Pt.9"	1:40
10.	"True Love, Pt.10"	1:53
11.	"True Love, Pt.11"	0:38
12.	"True Love, Pt.12"	1:36
13.	"True Love, Pt.13"	1:17
14.	"True Love, Pt.14"	1:27
15.	"True Love, Pt.15"	3:57
16.	"True Love, Pt.16"	2:44
17.	"True Love, Pt.17"	2:59
18.	"True Love, Pt.18"	2:56
Total length:		34:22

== Reception ==
Edward Bond of Sound of Life wrote that "composer Isabella Summers, had the chance to capture and deliver some powerful, generational musical themes. Instead, the original music took a subdued and somewhat secondary role to diegetic music." Peter Debruge of Variety and Angie Han of The Hollywood Reporter called it "charming" and "evocative". Robert Abele of Los Angeles Times called it a "solid score". Katie Walsh of The Seattle Times wrote "the soundtrack is filled with period (and mood) specific ‘80s new wave". Lisa Liman of The Spool called it "a moving score by composer Isabella Summers". Petrana Radulovic of Polygon called it "a sunny, acoustic guitar-laden score". Allyson Johnson of But Why Tho? wrote "Aiding it further and twinging it with even greater whimsy and heartache is the score from Isabella Summers, best known for her work with Florence and the Machine. The music, along with the frames of Ari’s vacant bedroom opposed to Dante’s which is overflowing, create a fully formed universe."

== Additional music ==
The following songs are featured in the film, but not included in the soundtrack:

- "Smalltown Boy" – written by James William Somerville, Steven William Bronski, Larry Steinbachek; performed by Bronski Beat
- "La Bamba" – performed by Juan del Castillo
- "Point of No Return" – written by Lewis Martineé; performed by Exposé
- "Seabird" – written by Bobby Alessi and Billy Alessi; performed by Alessi Brothers
- "Cruel Summer" – written by Sara Dallin, Siobhan Fahey, Steve Jolley, Tony Swain, Keren Woodward; performed by Bananarama
- "Me and My DJ" – written by W. Carl Parker; performed by Cool Carl
- "Heartbreak Beat" – written by John Ashton, Richard Butler, Timothy Butler; performed by the Psychedelic Furs
- "Cruel, Cruel World" – written and performed by Jackie Shane
- "El año viejo" – written by Crescencio Salcedo Monroy; performed by Celia Cruz
- "Shake Your Love" – written and performed by Debbie Gibson
- "Let the Music Play" – written by Chris Barbosa and Edward Chisolm; performed by Shannon
- "Reptile" – written by Steve Kilbey, Marty Willson Piper, Peter Koppes, Richard Ploog; performed by the Church
- "Face to Face" – written by Cris Arthur Gerniottis and John Joe Lopez; performed by Zakary Thaks
- "Tu casa nueva" – written by Gerard Alegre; performed by El Último Vecino

== Accolades ==
Awards	Date of ceremony	Category	Recipient(s) and nominee(s)	Result	Ref.
Chlotrudis Society for Independent Films	March 14, 2024	Best Use of Music in a Film	—	Nominated	
Guild of Music Supervisors Awards	March 3, 2024	Best Music Supervision for Films Budgeted Under $10 Million	Adam Bennati	Nominated	
