= Jonathan Hellyer =

British singer

- Born: Jonathan Paul Hellyer
- Occupations: Singer, director, drag actor

Jonathan Paul Hellyer is an English singer, theatre director and drag actor. He is best known for his time as the lead singer of Bronski Beat and collaborations with Wayne G.

== Career ==
=== Joining Bronski Beat ===
Hellyer joined the band, Bronski Beat following the departure of John Jon Foster and toured the U.S. and Europe with back-up vocalist Annie Conway, primarily touring nightclubs and LGBTQ festivals/events. They released the album, One More Chance and covered the songs, "I Love the Nightlife" by Alicia Bridges and "I'm Gonna Run Away from You" by Tami Lynn.

=== Collaboration with Eartha Kitt ===
In 1989, Bronski Beat wrote and collaborated with American-singer Eartha Kitt, on the song "Cha Cha Heels" which was written for Divine but following his death, Bronski Beat and Kitt performed the song with Hellyer on backing vocals. Despite making it to the charts, it was only a minor hit reaching #34 on the charts. The song was Hellyer's only big hit throughout his career. Hellyer recorded additional material with Bronski Beat for the next few years and performed at events around Europe and America.

=== Later work and first departure ===
Hellyer was an active member of the Nightingale Club, a gay bar in Birmingham. He was also a regular performer there in 1993. He did the voice announcements for the club and portrayed Dame Edna Everage during performances at the club too. Additionally he helped with organising charity event nights for the Birmingham AIDS Trust. After working with Eartha Kitt, Hellyer and Bronski Beat continued to collaborate until 1994. Hellyer provided the lead and backing vocals on the album Rainbow Nation which was a collection of both old and new songs. The songs that Hellyer provided lead vocals on included covers of "Hit That Perfect Beat" and "Why" from the Age of Consent album and the songs including "Kickin' up the Rain", "No Difference" and "Tell Me Your Name". Hellyer recorded a few more minor songs before departing the band in 1994.

=== Brief return and disbandment of Bronski Beat ===
Following Hellyer's departure in 1994, John Jon Foster was brought back briefly as the lead singer of Bronski Beat but ultimately dropped out in 1995 and was once more replaced by Hellyer but not long after, Steve Bronski decided to fold the band overall following the lack of success with newer material.

=== Recent works ===
Hellyer has performed and composed with artists including Trish O'Brien and the KBL Band. Hellyer appeared in productions of the Dame Edna Experience based on the television show. Hellyer has worked with Australian DJ Wayne G.

Additionally, Hellyer has also performed in a variety of shows around London since 2013, mostly doing live performances or drag shows while also singing cover songs and his own. Hellyer also continues to do performances as Dame Edna around the United Kingdom and the Royal Vauxhall Tavern in London.

== Vocal style and praise ==
Hellyer has a keening, falsetto like Jimmy Somerville, can hold notes and has a strong vocal range when singing. In an interview, Steve Bronski praised Hellyer's vocal style and said that he "was a perfect imitator. He could imitate Jimmy, he could imitate Jon Jon. He could intimidate you." Hellyer has been praised for his work in the drag show industry.

== Personal life ==
Hellyer is openly gay and produces, directs and stars in drag shows and songs with lesser-known artists/bands. He took part in the Elegies for Angels, Punks and Raging Queens at the Shaw Theatre in 2010. He also revealed in an interview that same year he is not a fan of modern comedies nor the Gavin & Stacey series or James Corden, the creator and actor in the series. Hellyer compared Corden to having syphilis.

== Discography ==
=== With Bronski Beat ===
- My Discarded Men (with Eartha Kitt) (1989)
- Cha Cha Heels (with Eartha Kitt) (1989)
- I'm Gonna Run Away from You (1990)
- Sweet Thing (as Hellyer) (1990)
- One More Chance (1991)
- "Bronski Beat - Kickin' Up The Rain / Hit That Perfect Beat Boy '95" (1995)
- Rainbow Nation (1995)
- "No Difference (as Hellyer)" (1995)
- "Bronski Beat - Why '95 / Kickin' Up The Rain" (1995)
- "Kickin' Up The Rain (F.T. & Co. Edit) (as Hellyer)" (1995)

=== With Wayne G ===
- If You're Not The One (Wayne G Club Mix) (as Jonathan Paul Hellyer) (2003)
- If You're Not The One (Club Mix) (2004)
- Do You Wanna Funk (As Jonathan Paul Hellyer) (2004)
- If You're Not The One (Wayne G Mix) (2006)
- I Promised Myself (Wayne G Classic Mix) (2010)

=== Solo projects ===
- "Taste of Tears (As Hellyer)" (2002)
