= The Age of Consent (album) =

Studio album by Bronski Beat
- Released: 15 October 1984
- Studios: The Garden, London; Skyline, New York City; RPM, New York City
- Genres: Synth-pop; disco; hi-NRG
- Length: 44:22
- Label: London
- Producer: Mike Thorne

Bronski Beat chronology
The Age of Consent (1984)	Hundreds & Thousands (1985)

Singles from The Age of Consent
- 1. "Smalltown Boy" Released: 25 May 1984; 2. "Why?" Released: 14 September 1984; 3. "It Ain't Necessarily So" Released: 23 November 1984; 4. "I Feel Love (Medley)" Released: 12 April 1985

The Age of Consent is the debut album by British synth-pop band Bronski Beat (Steve Bronski, Larry Steinbachek and Jimmy Somerville), released on London Records on October 15, 1984. This was the only album released by Bronski Beat to feature Somerville, who departed the band in 1985.

A re-recorded and expanded version was released in 2017 under the name of The Age of Reason, with Bronski, Ian Donaldson, and new singer Stephen Granville.

== Background ==
By 1984, many European countries had reduced the age of consent for homosexual acts to 16, but it remained at 21 in the United Kingdom, having only been partially decriminalised in 1967. Homosexuality was not ‘legalised’ in Scotland, where Somerville was born, until 1981. The wording of the legislation to decriminalise also included wording that placed restrictions such as making illegal the use of a hotel room for sex. Homosexuality was further stigmatised beyond the restrictions placed on homosexual individuals, and homophobia was a danger to gay individuals.

Against this background, Bronski, Steinbachek, and Somerville met in Brixton in 1983, and soon formed Bronski Beat. They signed a recording contract with London Records in 1984 after doing only nine live gigs.

The album was produced by Mike Thorne; the recording sessions took place in London and New York City. The first single, "Smalltown Boy", was recorded at The Garden studio (owned by former Ultravox singer John Foxx) and mixed at Maison Rouge studio, both of them based in London.

The song "Heatwave" features the tap-dancing rhythms of Caroline O'Connor.

The inner sleeve of the album has a table listing the minimum age for lawful homosexual relationships between men in each country in Europe, accompanied by the telephone number of a service giving gay legal advice. It was removed from the United States release of the album by MCA Records on the basis of "past sensitivities of several record store chains".

== Singles ==
The album produced four hit singles.

=== "Smalltown Boy" ===
The band's debut single was released on 25 May 1984, peaking at number 3 in the UK Singles Chart in June, and reaching number one in Belgium, Italy, and the Netherlands. It is a poetically poignant, soul searching composition addressing homophobia, loneliness and family misunderstanding. It has been described as perfectly encapsulating "the experience of being young and gay in the '80s".

It was accompanied by a video of Jimmy Somerville with fellow band member friends Larry Steinbachek and Steve Bronski, who, while cruising at a public swimming pool and changing room, are attacked and beaten up by a gang of homophobes. Somerville is returned to his family by the police; he leaves home alone and has a reunion with friends Steinbachek and Bronski, travelling to a new life on a train.

The band had the telephone number of the London Gay Switchboard (telephone support and information for gays and lesbians in central London) etched into the inner groove of the 12" vinyl version.

Additional congas were played by John Folarin. Sleeve cover art was by Gill Whisson.

=== "Why?" ===
The follow-up single "Why?" (recorded at RPM Studios, NYC and mixed at Townhouse Studio, London) pursued a more energetic musical formula, while the lyrics focused more centrally and darkly on anti-gay prejudice. The song opened with a questioning vocal by Somerville and the shattering of breaking glass. Released in September 1984, the single made the top 10 in the UK.

The promotional video opens with Steinbachek and Bronski buying artificial bombs and a small statue of Michelangelo's David in a mad supermarket. At the checkout, because they are openly gay, the assistant telephones the management to enquire whether they can pay for the items. They are refused. Meanwhile, Somerville is singing behind a counter of sausages and salamis and, seeing the dilemma in progress, starts complaining to the checkout girl. All three are arrested by "the thought police" and made to appear for trial before a puppet court and senile judge (Somerville's father in "Smalltown Boy"). The band members are then sent to a workhouse. From the workhouse, Somerville rises up into the air and confronts "God". The workers revolt, and strip the thought police of authority and clothing. The band members are placed on pedestals, before "God" transforms all three of them into statues of salt for their alleged sins.

The thought-police actors who arrest the trio are the swimmer / homophobic gang-leader from the "Smalltown Boy" video and "Martin", a friend of the band whose situation in a gay relationship with a younger man actually inspired the lyrical content of the song. The video extras were mostly friends of the band; they went on strike during the video shoot, due to the excess labour endured by them in the production.

The "Smalltown Boy" and "Why?" videos were directed by Bernard Rose, who also directed the original video for Frankie Goes to Hollywood's "Relax".

The song is dedicated to the memory of playwright Drew Griffiths, a victim of a homophobic murder in 1984.

The sleeve cover art was by Robert McAulay.

=== "It Ain't Necessarily So" ===
The third single "It Ain't Necessarily So", the George and Ira Gershwin/ DuBose Heyward song (from the opera Porgy and Bess) that expresses opposition to biblical literalism, was released in November 1984 and reached the UK top 20. The track features Arno Hecht from The Uptown Horns on solo clarinet and the openly gay male choir from London, The Pink Singers. It was recorded at The Garden studio, London and Skyline Studios, NYC.

The promotional video features Somerville and Steinbachek as inmates in a borstal with Somerville and "Martin" (the "thought police" actor from "Why?") having a Christmas pie-eating competition which takes place during the Christmas religious service, which Somerville wins. Bronski plays a closeted prison warden who has a keen eye for one of the other prisoners.

The cover sleeve art was a parody of The Wizard Of Oz, with Dorothy having the head of the devil.

=== "I Feel Love (Medley)" ===
A fourth (and final) single was released before Somerville left the band in 1985: a medley of "I Feel Love / Johnny Remember Me / Love to Love You Baby".

A version of the medley had already appeared on The Age of Consent, combining Donna Summer's seminal disco classic "I Feel Love" with John Leyton's "Johnny Remember Me", which had topped the UK charts in 1961. For its single release, former Soft Cell singer Marc Almond was enlisted to duet with Somerville, and another Summer disco song, "Love to Love You Baby", was added as the intro and coda. The single also featured a new backing track that was more synthpop-oriented than the original album version. As with the band's previous single, the choir providing backing vocals was The Pink Singers. Cellos were played by Beverly Lauridsen, Jesse Levy and Mark Shuman.

"I Feel Love (Medley)" was released in April 1985, with sleeve cover art by Gill Whisson. It became a big hit in the UK, entering the top 10 in its second week on the chart and peaking at number 3 for two weeks.

== Critical reception ==
Professional ratings
Review scores
Source	Rating
AllMusic	4.5/5 stars
Pitchfork	7.2/10
The Village Voice	C+

The Village Voice's Robert Christgau, in a contemporaneous review, noted the album's "two good singles" but added that "good politics don't have to be this monochromatic" and criticised the "narrow dynamic range that afflicts so many falsettos, even those with impeccable reasons for singing like women." The album ranked at number 12 in CMJ's "Top 20 Most-Played Albums of 1985" list. John Dougan of AllMusic retrospectively described the album's songs as "compelling vignettes about the vagaries of life as a gay man" and The Age of Consent as "simply a great album, period."

Spin wrote, "The album's principal songs all mine the rather overworked vein of late-'70s disco. This is clearly the music they grew up loving, and they approach it as fans rather than cynics. Disco really isn't the right vehicle to carry the weight of sadness, anger and lust that they load onto it."

== Track listing ==
All tracks are written by Jimmy Somerville, Larry Steinbachek and Steve Bronski; except where noted.

No.	Title	Writer(s)	Length
1.	"Why?"		4:04
2.	"It Ain't Necessarily So"	George Gershwin, Ira Gershwin, DuBose Heyward, Dorothy Heyward	4:40
3.	"Screaming"		4:13
4.	"No More War"		3:52
5.	"Love and Money"		5:08
6.	"Smalltown Boy"		5:00
7.	"Heatwave"		2:41
8.	"Junk"		4:17
9.	"Need-a-Man Blues"	Giorgio Moroder, Pete Bellotte, Donna Summer	4:19
10.	"I Feel Love/Johnny Remember Me"	Giorgio Moroder, Pete Bellotte, Donna Summer, Geoff Goddard	5:59

Original CD release bonus tracks
No.	Title	Length
11.	"Smalltown Boy" (full 12" version)	9:04
12.	"Why?" (full 12" version)	7:46

1996 digitally remastered reissue bonus tracks
No.	Title	Length
11.	"I Feel Love" (medley with Marc Almond)	8:22
12.	"Run from Love" (re-mix from Hundreds & Thousands)	8:14
13.	"Hard Rain" (re-mix from Hundreds & Thousands)	7:54
14.	"Memories"	2:54
15.	"Puit D'Amour"	1:30
16.	"Heatwave" (re-mix from Hundreds & Thousands)	5:44

2018 reissue disc one and 2022 reissue bonus tracks
No.	Title	Length
11.	"Why?" (12" version)	7:47
12.	"Smalltown Boy" (12" version)	9:05
13.	"It Ain't Necessarily So" (12" version)	5:23
14.	"I Feel Love/Johnny Remember Me" (12" version)	10:41

2012 remastered deluxe edition bonus tracks
No.	Title	Length
11.	"Smalltown Boy" (7" edit)	3:58
12.	"Why?" (remix)	5:13
13.	"I Feel Love Medley" (Source mix)	10:10
14.	"It Ain't Necessarily So" (12" version)	5:22
15.	"Red Dance"	6:53

2012 remastered deluxe edition disc two (Hundreds & Thousands with bonus tracks)
No.	Title	Length
1.	"Heatwave" (Goldberg remix)	5:44
2.	"Why?" (Goldberg remix)	6:17
3.	"Run from Love" (Maita remix)	8:14
4.	"Hard Rain" (Goldberg remix)	7:52
5.	"Smalltown Boy" (Goldberg remix)	5:54
6.	"Junk" (Goldberg remix)	6:14
7.	"I Feel Love" (Fruit mix)	8:03
8.	"Hard Rain" (demo)	4:04
9.	"Screaming" (demo)	4:06
10.	"Signs (And Wonders)"	5:00
11.	"Potato Fields"	2:59
12.	"Run from Love" (radio version)	4:08
13.	"Puit D'Amour"	1:38
14.	"Close to the Edge"	4:44
15.	"Cadillac Car"	3:54

2018 reissue disc two
No.	Title	Length
1.	"It Ain't Necessarily So" (Kid Jenson BBC session)	2:21
2.	"Memories" (Kid Jenson BBC session)	2:34
3.	"Crazy Maraquitta" (Kid Jenson BBC session)	2:34
4.	"Why?" (Kid Jenson BBC session)	3:00
5.	"No More War" (demo)	4:11
6.	"Up and Down" (instrumental demo)	3:42
7.	"Heatwave" (demo)	2:50
8.	"Ultra Clone" (instrumental demo)	2:50
9.	"Junk" (demo)	5:13
10.	"The Other Side of the Tracks" (demo)	3:41
11.	"I Feel Love/Johnny Remember Me" (rough mix)	5:45
12.	"Smalltown Boy" (reprise 2014)	2:45
13.	"Why?" (live at Stella Polaris)	5:08
14.	"Smalltown Boy" (Arnaud Rebotini remix)	5:36
15.	"Why?" (Wax Wings remix)	5:30
16.	"Smalltown Boy" (KDA Pink Triangle remix)	7:33

Note:

- Digital releases of the 2018 deluxe edition replace the original KDA Pink Triangle remix with its edit version, with a runtime of 4:16.

== Personnel ==
Bronski Beat

- Steve Bronski – keyboards, percussion
- Larry Steinbachek – keyboards, percussion
- Jimmy Somerville – vocals

Additional personnel

- Beverly Lauridsen, Jesse Levy, Mark Shuman – cello
- The Pink Singers – choir
- John Folarin – congas
- Horns – Uptown Horns (Crispin Cioe (alto saxophone & solo, "Love And Money"), Arno Hecht (tenor saxophone), Richard Coles (clarinet solo, "It Ain't Necessarily So"), "Hollywood" Paul Litteral (trumpet) and Bob Funk (trombone))
- Caroline O'Connor – tap dance
- Kevin Glancy – backing vocals

Technical

- Recording engineers – Peter Griffiths (London), Carl Beatty (NYC) & Dominick Maita (NYC)
- Mixing engineers – Harvey Goldberg and Julian Mendelsohn ("Why?")
- Recorded at The Garden (London), Skyline (NYC) & RPM (NYC)
- Mixed at Maison Rouge, The Town House and Right Track Recording
- Mastered by Jack Skinner (Sterling Sound, NYC) & Arun Chakraverty (The Master Room, London)
- Producer – Mike Thorne

== Charts ==
=== Weekly charts ===
Weekly chart performance for The Age of Consent
Chart (1984–1985)	Peak position
Australian Albums (Kent Music Report)	12
Canada Top Albums/CDs (RPM)	7
Dutch Albums (Album Top 100)	4
European Albums (Eurotipsheet)	11
French Albums (IFOP)	14
German Albums (Offizielle Top 100)	10
Italian Albums (Musica e dischi)	14
Italian Albums (Discografia Internazionale)	11
New Zealand Albums (RMNZ)	5
Swedish Albums (Sverigetopplistan)	41
Swiss Albums (Schweizer Hitparade)	7
UK Albums (Official Charts)	4
US Billboard Dance	20
US Billboard 200	36

Chart (2018)	Peak position
Scottish Albums (OCC)	45

=== Year-end charts ===
1984 year-end chart performance for The Age of Consent
Chart (1984)	Position
Dutch Albums (Album Top 100)	28
UK Albums (Gallup)	50

1985 year-end chart performance for The Age of Consent
Chart (1985)	Position
Canada Top Albums/CDs (RPM)	39
Dutch Albums (Album Top 100)	52
German Albums (Offizielle Top 100)	55
New Zealand Albums (RMNZ)	47
UK Albums (Gallup)	34

== Certifications ==
Certifications for The Age of Consent
Region	Certification	Certified units/sales
Canada (Music Canada)	Platinum	100,000^{^}
France (SNEP)	Gold	100,000^{*}
Netherlands (NVPI)	Gold	50,000^{^}
United Kingdom (BPI)	Platinum	300,000^{^}
^{*} Sales figures based on certification alone.^{^} Shipments figures based on certification alone.
