= Tell Me Why (Supermode song) =

2006 single by Supermode

Single by Supermode

from the album Until One
- Released: 24 July 2006
- Genre: Progressive house
- Length: 7:03; 2:51 (radio edit)
- Label: Bonnier Music; Data; Ministry of Sound
- Songwriters: Jimmy Somerville; Larry Steinbachek; Steve Bronski
- Producers: Steve Angello; Axwell

"Tell Me Why" is a song produced by Swedish DJs Steve Angello and Axwell (both later members of the trio Swedish House Mafia) under the name "Supermode" (originally called "Supermongo"). The song interpolates two Bronski Beat songs from their album The Age of Consent. The music is sampled from the song "Smalltown Boy" and a majority of the lyrics are taken from it, though the lyrics for the chorus are taken from the song "Why?". The vocals are reconstructed and performed by Hal Ritson.

== Track listings ==
Swedish maxi-CD single

1. "Tell Me Why" (radio edit)
2. "Tell Me Why" (vocal club mix)
3. "Tell Me Why" (TV Rock)
4. "Tell Me Why" (Raul Rincon mix)
5. "Tell Me Why" (original)

UK CD single

1. "Tell Me Why" (radio edit)
2. "Tell Me Why" (vocal club mix)
3. "Tell Me Why" (original mix)
4. "Tell Me Why" (2 Elements remix)
5. "Tell Me Why" (Raul Rincon mix)
6. "Tell Me Why" (TV Rock remix)
7. "Tell Me Why" (video CD-ROM)

UK 12-inch single

A1. "Tell Me Why" (vocal club mix)
B1. "Tell Me Why" (original mix)
B2. "Tell Me Why" (Raul Rincon remix)

Australian CD single

1. "Tell Me Why" (radio edit)
2. "Tell Me Why" (original mix)
3. "Tell Me Why" (Raul Rincon remix)
4. "Tell Me Why" (TV Rock remix)

== Charts ==
=== Weekly charts ===
Chart (2006)	Peak position
Australia (ARIA)	48
Belgium (Ultratop 50 Flanders)	22
Belgium (Ultratip Bubbling Under Wallonia)	2
CIS Airplay (TopHit)	3
Denmark (Tracklisten)	14
Finland (Suomen virallinen lista)	14
France (SNEP)	22
Germany (GfK)	65
Hungary (Dance Top 40)	15
Hungary (Single Top 40)	5
Netherlands (Dutch Top 40)	5
Netherlands (Single Top 100)	11
Romania (Romanian Top 100)	42
Russia Airplay (TopHit)	3
Scottish Singles Sales (Official Charts)	10
Spain (Promusicae)	19
UK Singles (Official Charts)	13
UK Dance (Official Charts)	2
Ukraine Airplay (TopHit)	41

=== Year-end charts ===
Chart (2006)	Position
CIS Airplay (TopHit)	20
Netherlands (Dutch Top 40)	35
Netherlands (Single Top 100)	67
Russia Airplay (TopHit)	17
UK Singles (OCC)	144

Chart (2007)	Position
CIS Airplay (TopHit)	85
Russia Airplay (TopHit)	80

=== Decade-end charts ===
Chart (2000–2009)	Position
Russia Airplay (TopHit)	30

== Certifications ==
Region	Certification	Certified units/sales
Germany (BVMI)	Gold	300,000^{‡}
Italy (FIMI)	Gold	50,000^{‡}
New Zealand (RMNZ)	Platinum	30,000^{‡}
Spain (Promusicae) (since 2015)	Gold	30,000^{‡}
United Kingdom (BPI)	Gold	400,000^{‡}
^{‡} Sales+streaming figures based on certification alone.

== Release history ==
Region	Date	Format(s)	Label(s)	Ref.
United Kingdom	24 July 2006	12-inch vinyl; CD	Data; Ministry of Sound	
Australia	28 August 2006	CD	Ministry of Sound	
