= The Communards discography =

- Studio albums: 2
- Live albums: 1
- Compilation albums: 5
- Singles: 9

This is a comprehensive listing of the discography by British synth-pop duo The Communards. Both of their studio albums, Communards and Red, reached the top ten and achieved Platinum status in the UK. The Communards had success during the latter part of the decade with two hit studio albums and nine hit singles. Since their demise, there has been some commercial success with the releases of various compilation albums.

== Albums ==
=== Studio albums ===
Title	Album details	Peak chart positions										Certifications
Title	Album details	UK	AUS	AUT	FRA	GER	NED	NZ	SWE	SWI	US	Certifications
Communards	Released: 14 July 1986; Label: London	7	20	—	8	15	5	26	22	10	90	BPI: Platinum; SNEP: Gold
Red	Released: 5 October 1987; Label: London	4	97	15	3	22	32	29	—	20	93	BPI: Platinum; IFPI SWI: Gold; SNEP: 2× Gold
"—" denotes items that did not chart or were not released in that territory.

=== Compilation albums ===
Title	Album details	Peak chart positions										Certifications
Title	Album details	UK	AUT	FRA	GER	IRE	NED	NZ	SCO	SWE	SWI	Certifications
The Singles Collection 1984/1990 (with Jimmy Somerville and Bronski Beat)	Released: November 1990; Label: London	4	10	4	4	—	6	30	—	47	4	BVMI: Gold; IFPI SWI: Platinum; SNEP: Platinum
Heaven	Released: 1993; Label: London	—	—	—	—	—	—	—	—	—	—	
The Very Best of (with Jimmy Somerville and Bronski Beat)	Released: 2001; Label: London	38	—	15	49	—	—	—	31	—	—	BPI: Silver
The Platinum Collection	Released: 2006; Label: Warner Music	—	—	—	—	53	—	—	—	—	—	
For a Friend: The Best of (with Jimmy Somerville and Bronski Beat)	Released: 2009; Label: Music Club Deluxe	—	—	—	—	—	—	—	—	—	—	
"—" denotes items that did not chart or were not released in that territory.

=== Live albums ===
Title	Album details
Live In Italy (Picture Disc LP)	Released: 1986

== Singles ==
Year	Title	Peak chart positions									Certifications	Album
Year	Title	UK	AUS	BEL	FRA	GER	IRE	NED	NZ	SWI	Certifications	Album
1985	"You Are My World"	30	—	—	16	—	7	—	—	—	SNEP: Silver	Communards
1986	"Disenchanted"	29	—	—	—	—	20	47	—	—		Communards
1986	"Don't Leave Me This Way" (with Sarah Jane Morris)	1	2	1	6	5	1	1	2	2	BPI: Platinum; SNEP: Silver	Communards
1986	"So Cold the Night"	8	90	7	17	14	4	8	44	10		Communards
1987	"You Are My World '87" (remix)	21	—	31	—	59	7	23	—	—		Communards
1987	"Tomorrow"	23	99	31	32	25	4	31	—	23		Red
1987	"Never Can Say Goodbye"	4	13	4	9	6	2	3	6	12	BPI: Silver; SNEP: Silver	Red
1988	"For a Friend"	28	—	29	—	35	12	—	—	—		Red
1988	"There's More to Love"	20	—	—	—	34	10	—	—	—		Red
"—" denotes items that did not chart or were not released in that territory.

=== Remix singles ===
- (1986) "Disenchanted"
  US Hot Dance Music/Maxi-Singles Sales #43
- (1986) "Don't Leave Me This Way"
  US Hot Dance Music/Maxi-Singles Sales #3
  US Club Play Singles #1
- (1986) "So Cold the Night"
  US Club Play Singles #25
- (1987) "Never Can Say Goodbye"
  US Hot Dance Music/Maxi-Singles Sales #3
  US Club Play Singles #2

== Videos ==
Title	Year	Details	Format
The Video Singles	1986	Compilation of music videos from 1985 to 1986	VHS
Live at Full House Rock Show	2006	Live TV concert from Hannover, Germany (10/2/87)	DVD

== See also ==
- Jimmy Somerville discography
- Bronski Beat discography
- Banderas - Communards offshoot featuring backing musician Sally Herbert
