= Cha Cha Heels =

Single by Eartha Kitt and Bronski Beat

from the album I'm Still Here
- B-side: "My Discarded Men"
- Released: June 1989
- Recorded: 1988
- Studio: Berwick Street
- Genre: Synth-pop; Hi-NRG
- Length: 3:50
- Label: Arista
- Songwriters: Steve Bronski; Larry Steinbachek
- Producer: Rod Gammons

Eartha Kitt singles chronology
"Arabian Song" (1987)	"Cha Cha Heels" (1989)	"Primitive Man" (1989)

Bronski Beat singles chronology
"C'mon! C'mon!" (1986)	"Cha Cha Heels" (1989)	"I'm Gonna Run Away from You" (1990)

"Cha Cha Heels" is a pop song recorded by Bronski Beat and Eartha Kitt, released in June 1989 from her album I'm Still Here as a tribute to drag actor and singer Divine.

== History ==
The band originally wrote the song for Divine to record and perform, but as the actor had died before it could be recorded, Bronski Beat member Steve Bronski consequently teamed up with singer Jessica James as she reminded him of Eartha Kitt. However, he eventually brought in Kitt herself to record the lines with James providing backing female vocals and Jonathan Hellyer for the male backing vocals and certain choruses. Hellyer also got his own solo part towards the end of the song with Kitt talking over him. The song's lyrics and instrumentation were recorded by Bronski Beat members Steve Bronski and Larry Steinbachek in what would be Steinbachek's final chart song and video appearances with Bronski Beat, although he did appear on the covers of "I Love the Nightlife" and "I'm Gonna Run Away from You" with Bronski and Hellyer before quietly departing the band and being replaced by Ian Donaldson. Following the single's release, the BBC interviewed both Bronski Beat and Kitt with stock footage of them passing through Hyde Park, and the song was also briefly shown on Top of the Tops.

== Music video and performances ==
The song was lip-synced and performed on two television shows although not much exists to confirm where they were filmed. In one performance, all the members of Bronski Beat are present with Kitt and two male African dancers. However, in a second one, Steinbachek is not present and only Hellyer and Bronski with Kitt and the same dancers are present.

The music video was filmed in a nightclub and consists of Eartha Kitt performing on stage with two African male dancers and her eyeing up a man played by actor Rayner Bourton. His character, the main antagonist, is on a mission to steal the "cha cha heels", which are a pair of red high heels similar to the black high heels desired by Dawn Davenport, Divine's character in the 1974 film Female Trouble. Eartha Kitt, as the owner of the shoes, instructs her henchman to retrieve them. Eventually, Bourton's character is cornered with subliminal LGBTQ+ messages and props. Towards the end of the video, he is wearing the heels and Kitt plays a magic trick making him dance around in a circle before he is tired out and Kitt departs through a red fog. Throughout the video, the members of Bronski Beat are seen wearing red glowing sunglasses when staring at certain points at Kitt and Bourton. They look through a spy mirror at the scenes with Bourton and Kitt with Hellyer on the right providing backing vocals while Bronski is on the left with a keyboard. Interestingly, Steinbachek is present for the intro and outro with the sunglasses being put on and close ups of the band but is missing from the rest of the video, which is likely a result of him slowly departing the band at the time.

== Track listings ==
7" & Cassette

1. "Cha Cha Heels" (Radio Mix) (Steve Bronski, Larry Steinbachek) – 3:50
2. "My Discarded Men" (Eartha Mae Kitt, Roderick Allen Gammons, Steve Bronski) – 3:38

12"

1. "Cha Cha Heels" (Steve Bronski, Larry Steinbachek) – 6:40
2. "Cha Cha Heels" (Radio Mix) (Steve Bronski, Larry Steinbachek) – 3:50
3. "My Discarded Men" (Eartha Mae Kitt, Roderick Allen Gammons, Steve Bronski) – 3:38

12" (Remix)

1. "Cha Cha Heels" (Remixed Version) (Steve Bronski, Larry Steinbachek) – 7:10
2. "Cha Cha Heels" (Radio Mix) (Steve Bronski, Larry Steinbachek) – 3:50
3. "My Discarded Men" (Eartha Mae Kitt, Roderick Allen Gammons, Steve Bronski) – 3:38

== Personnel ==
Musicians

- Eartha Kitt – lead vocals
- Jonathan Hellyer – backing vocals
- Jessica James – backing vocals
- Steve Bronski – keyboards, bass, Alesis MMT8 sequencer programming
- Larry Steinbachek – Yamaha QXI sequencer programming
- Rod Gammons – keyboards, Atari/C-Lab sequencer programming
- Will Mowat – keyboards
- Danny Hyde – additional effects

Technical

- Rod Gammons – producer
- Danny Hyde – engineer
- Graham Bonnett – engineer
- Peter Lorimer – assistant engineer
- Rob Miller – assistant engineer
- Francis Loney – photography

== Charts ==
Chart (1989)	Peak position
Ireland (IRMA)	22
UK Singles (Official Charts)	32

== Covers ==
Steve Bronski teamed up with singer Jessica James in 2015 with Bronski on backing vocals but this was simply a one off version of the song.
