= Harpers West One =

British television series (1961–1963)

Harpers West One titles

Harpers West One is an ATV television drama series about a fictional department store, Harpers, in the West 1 district of London.

The show was created by John Whitney and Geoffrey Bellman and ran in one-hour episodes from 1961 to 1963. It was introduced by ATV while Probation Officer, was being rested, but instead became an immediate success. Press releases described it as "shopping with the lid off". A combination of drama and soap opera, it has also been described as presaging corporate dramas such as The Brothers for its depiction of power struggles at board level.

Principal writers included Derrick De Marney. The show sometimes featured popular singers in the "music department" such as John Leyton who played the role of Johnny St Cyr and sang the song "Johnny Remember Me". The publicity helped him to establish his career.

== Selected cast ==
- Norman Bowler – Roger Pike
- Graham Crowden – Edward Cruickshank
- Arthur Hewlett – Aubrey Harper
- Jan Holden – Harriet Carr
- Philip Latham – Oliver Backhouse
- Vivian Pickles – Julie Wheeler
- Wendy Richard – Susan Sullivan
