= C'mon! C'mon! (Bronski Beat song) =

Single by Bronski Beat

from the album Truthdare Doubledare
- Released: 10 March 1986
- Genre: Synth-pop
- Label: MCA
- Songwriters: Steve Bronski; John Foster; Larry Steinbachek

Bronski Beat singles chronology
"Hit That Perfect Beat" (1985)	"C'mon! C'mon!" (1986)	"I'm Gonna Run Away from You" (1990)

"C'mon! C'mon!" is a 1986 song by British synth-pop band Bronski Beat from their album, Truthdare Doubledare. In its review of the album upon its release, Billboard identified "C'mon C'mon" as one of the stronger tracks that "should find mainstream and alternative fans." A music video for the song was directed by Peter Care. Despite being recognized as one of the stronger tracks on the album, the single only reached No. 20 in the UK singles chart, indicating Bronski Beat's popularity was beginning to wane.

== Charts ==
Weekly chart performance for "C'mon! C'mon!"
Chart (1986)	Peak position
Italy (TV Sorrisi e Canzoni)	40
Ireland (IRMA)	9
New Zealand (Recorded Music NZ)	31
UK Singles (OCC)	20
West Germany (GfK)	32
