= Truthdare Doubledare =

- Different releases of the album feature the drummers coloured blue or green.

Studio album by Bronski Beat
- Released: 28 April 1986
- Studio: Music Works; The Scout Hut; Berry Street
- Genre: Synth-pop; dance
- Length: 60:49
- Label: London
- Producer: Adam Williams

Bronski Beat chronology
Hundreds & Thousands (1985)	Truthdare Doubledare (1986)	Rainbow Nation (1995)

Singles from Truthdare Doubledare
- 1. "Hit That Perfect Beat" Released: 11 November 1985; 2. "C'mon! C'mon!" Released: 10 March 1986

Truthdare Doubledare is the second album (released in 1986 on MCA Records) by the British synth-pop band Bronski Beat. It is their first album to feature John Foster as lead vocalist, following the departure of Jimmy Somerville.

== Critical reception ==
Professional ratings
Review scores
Source	Rating
AllMusic	2.5/5 stars

The Ottawa Citizen wrote that "the Caribbean sound of 'C'mon! C'mon!' and the energetic dance number, 'Hit That Perfect Beat', are prime examples of the Bronskis' diverse musical change." The Gazette noted that "the band's gay political stance and dance-floor logic remains intact."

== Track listing ==
All tracks were written by Steve Bronski, Larry Steinbachek and John Jon.

Vinyl side one

1. "Hit That Perfect Beat" – 3:38
2. "Truthdare Doubledare" – 4:42
3. "C'mon! C'mon!" – 3:49
4. "Punishment for Love" – 4:14
5. "We Know How It Feels" – 4:13

Vinyl side two

1. "This Heart" – 4:17
2. "Do It" – 3:49
3. "Dr. John" – 4:36
4. "In My Dreams" – 4:17

U.S. CD and digital releases

1. "Hit That Perfect Beat" – 3:38
2. "Truthdare Doubledare" – 4:42
3. "C'mon! C'mon!" – 3:49
4. "Punishment for Love" – 4:14
5. "We Know How It Feels" – 4:13
6. "This Heart" – 4:17
7. "Do It" – 3:49
8. "Dr. John" – 4:36
9. "In My Dreams" – 4:17
10. "Hit That Perfect Beat" (12" version) – 6:25
11. "C'mon! C'mon!" (12" version) – 6:14

International CD release

1. "Hit That Perfect Beat" – 3:38
2. "Truthdare Doubledare" – 4:43
3. "C'mon! C'mon!" – 3:50
4. "Punishment for Love" – 4:14
5. "We Know How It Feels" – 4:13
6. "This Heart" – 4:19
7. "Do It" – 3:50
8. "Dr. John" – 4:41
9. "In My Dreams" – 4:17
10. "What Are You Going to Do About It" – 6:15
11. "C'mon! C'mon!" (12" version) – 6:15
12. "Hit That Perfect Beat" (12" version) – 6:21
13. "I Gave You Everything" – 4:00

== Personnel ==
Bronski Beat

- Steve Bronski – 6- and 12-string guitars, double-speed guitar, accordion, synthesizers, keyboards, programming
- Larry Steinbachek – drums, percussion, drum programming, keyboards, marimba
- John Jon Foster – vocals

Additional musicians

- Adam Williams – bass guitar
- Bobby Valentino – violin
- Peter Glenister – guitar
- Alec Ewing – guitar
- Tony Marone – percussion
- Simon Clarke – flute, alto sax, baritone sax, piccolo
- Roddy Lorimer – trumpet, flugelhorn
- Tim Saunders – tenor sax
- David Stewart – bass trombone
- Tim Wheater – African noise flute
- The Kick Horns – brass arrangements and performance
- PP Arnold – backing vocals
- Beverly Skeete – backing vocals
- Jay Carly – backing vocals
- Mike Myers Major Minors – backing vocals

Technical personnel

- Adam Williams – production
- Tom Frederikse – engineering
- Gareth Jones – mixing
- Peter Barrett – cover design
- Ashworth Morton – photography
- Michael Morton – photography

== Charts ==
Chart (1986/87)	Peak position
Australian Albums Chart	12
Austrian Albums (Ö3 Austria)	20
German Albums (Offizielle Top 100)	21
New Zealand Albums (RMNZ)	35
Swiss Albums (Schweizer Hitparade)	9
UK Albums (Official Charts)	18
Chart (2026)	Peak position
Scottish Albums (Official Charts)	18
UK Independent Albums (Official Charts)	5
