= List of Dutch Top 40 number-one singles of 1984 =

These hits topped the Dutch Top 40 in 1984.

Issue Date	Song	Artist(s)	Reference
7 January	"You Are"	Dolly Parton	
14 January	"You Are"	Dolly Parton	
21 January	"Love Me Just a Little Bit More (Totally Hooked on You)"	Dolly Dots	
28 January	"Love of the Common People"	Paul Young	
4 February	"Love of the Common People"	Paul Young	
11 February	"Love of the Common People"	Paul Young	
18 February	"Love of the Common People"	Paul Young	
25 February	"Radio Ga Ga"	Queen	
3 March	"When the Lady Smiles"	Golden Earring	
10 March	"When the Lady Smiles"	Golden Earring	
17 March	"Love Is a Battlefield"	Pat Benatar	
24 March	"Love Is a Battlefield"	Pat Benatar	
31 March	"Love Is a Battlefield"	Pat Benatar	
7 April	"Love Is a Battlefield"	Pat Benatar	
14 April	"Hello"	Lionel Richie	
21 April	"Hello"	Lionel Richie	
28 April	"Hello"	Lionel Richie	
5 May	"Hello"	Lionel Richie	
12 May	"Ik voel me zo verdomd alleen"	Danny de Munk	
19 May	"Ik voel me zo verdomd alleen"	Danny de Munk	
26 May	"I Want to Break Free"	Queen	
2 June	"I Want to Break Free"	Queen	
9 June	"The Reflex"	Duran Duran	
16 June	"The Reflex"	Duran Duran	
23 June	"The Reflex"	Duran Duran	
30 June	"The Reflex"	Duran Duran	
7 July	"The Reflex"	Duran Duran	
14 July	"The Reflex"	Duran Duran	
21 July	"Wake Me Up Before You Go-Go"	Wham!	
28 July	"Wake Me Up Before You Go-Go"	Wham!	
4 August	"Two Tribes"	Frankie Goes to Hollywood	
11 August	"Two Tribes"	Frankie Goes to Hollywood	
18 August	"Two Tribes"	Frankie Goes to Hollywood	
25 August	"Smalltown Boy"	Bronski Beat	
1 September	"Smalltown Boy"	Bronski Beat	
8 September	"Careless Whisper"	George Michael	
15 September	"Careless Whisper"	George Michael	
22 September	"Careless Whisper"	George Michael	
29 September	"Careless Whisper"	George Michael	
6 October	"Careless Whisper"	George Michael	
13 October	"I Just Called to Say I Love You"	Stevie Wonder	
20 October	"I Just Called to Say I Love You"	Stevie Wonder	
27 October	"I Just Called to Say I Love You"	Stevie Wonder	
3 November	"Purple Rain"	Prince & The Revolution	
10 November	"Purple Rain"	Prince & The Revolution	
17 November	"Purple Rain"	Prince & The Revolution	
24 November	"Purple Rain"	Prince & The Revolution	
1 December	"When the Rain Begins to Fall"	Jermaine Jackson & Pia Zadora	
8 December	"When the Rain Begins to Fall"	Jermaine Jackson & Pia Zadora	
15 December	"When the Rain Begins to Fall"	Jermaine Jackson & Pia Zadora	
22 December	"When the Rain Begins to Fall"	Jermaine Jackson & Pia Zadora	
29 December	No Top 40 released		

== See also ==
- 1984 in music
