= Wild Wind =

1961 single by John Leyton

Single by John Leyton
- B-side: "You Took My Love for Granted"
- Released: 29 September 1961
- Recorded: 1961
- Studio: RGM Sound, London
- Genre: Pop
- Length: 2:13
- Label: Top Rank
- Songwriter(s): Geoff Goddard
- Producer(s): Joe Meek

John Leyton singles chronology
"Johnny Remember Me" (1961)	"Wild Wind" (1961)	"Son, This Is She" (1961)

"Wild Wind" is a song by English singer John Leyton, released as a single in September 1961. It became his second UK top-ten hit and also earned him his second silver disc for sales of over 250,000 copies.

== Release ==
Released as the follow up to his number-one hit "Johnny Remember Me", "Wild Wind" followed a similar formula. It was written by Geoff Goddard, produced by Joe Meek, and featured the Outlaws on backing, all of whom had also done the same for "Johnny Remember Me". There were significant advance orders of "Wild Wind", which according to the record company EMI (who owned Top Rank), would normally be expected for the established stars such as Cliff Richard and Elvis Presley.

"Wild Wind" was released at the end of September 1961 whilst "Johnny Remember Me" was still in the UK singles chart. It quickly went to number two in that chart, spending two weeks there, unable to displace Helen Shapiro's "Walkin' Back to Happiness".

== Charts ==
Chart (1961)	Peak position
Ireland (Evening Herald)	6
UK Disc Top 20	2
UK Melody Maker Top 20	2
UK New Musical Express Top 30	2
UK Record Mirror Top 20	2
UK Record Retailer Top 50	2
