= Oscar Peterson Plays George Gershwin =

Studio album by Oscar Peterson
- Released: 1953
- Recorded: December 1952
- Genre: Jazz
- Label: Clef Records
- Producer: Norman Granz

Professional ratings
Review scores
| Source | Rating |
|---|---|
| The Penguin Guide to Jazz Recordings | 3/4 stars |

Oscar Peterson Plays George Gershwin is an album by pianist Oscar Peterson of popular songs written by George Gershwin and Ira Gershwin.

In 1956, Columbia released a series of individual "clef series" 45rpms under the same title with four selected tracks from the original LP record.

Verve Records reissued the album in 1985 under the title "Oscar Peterson - The George Gershwin Songbook" in Germany through PolyGram.

== Track listing ==
1. "The Man I Love"
2. "Fascinating Rhythm
3. "It Ain't Necessarily So"
4. "Somebody Loves Me
5. "Strike Up The Band"
6. "I've Got a Crush On You"
7. "I Was Doing All Right"
8. "S'Wonderful"
9. "Oh, Lady be Good!"
10. "I Got Rhythm"
11. "A Foggy Day"
12. "Love Walked In"

== Credits ==
- Ray Brown – double bass
- Barney Kessel – guitar
- Oscar Peterson – piano
