= Hundreds & Thousands =

Remix album by Bronski Beat
- Released: September 1985
- Genres: Synth-pop; disco
- Label: Polygram International

Bronski Beat chronology
The Age of Consent (1984)	Hundreds & Thousands (1985)	Truthdare Doubledare (1986)

Hundreds & Thousands is a remix album by Bronski Beat released in 1985.

The compilation was assembled after lead singer Jimmy Somerville's departure from the band, combining tracks from what would have been the next single ("Run From Love"/"Hard Rain") with new remixes of four tracks from The Age of Consent. It was the last Bronski Beat album to feature Somerville's vocals.

The cassette and CD editions added three B-sides and an existing 12" single remix of "I Feel Love". (The remaining B-sides "Red Dance", "The Potato Fields", "Puit d'Amour" and "Signs & Wonders" were not included until the 2012 re-release which paired the album with The Age of Consent)

== Track listing ==
=== Vinyl LP ===
Side A

1. "Heat Wave" [remix] - 5:44
2. "Why" [remix] - 6:17
3. "Run from Love" - 8:14

Side B

1. "Hard Rain" - 7:52
2. "Smalltown Boy" [remix] - 5:54
3. "Junk" [remix] - 6:14

=== Cassette ===
Side One

1. "Heat Wave" [remix]
2. "Why" [remix]
3. "Run from Love"
4. "Hard Rain"
5. "Smalltown Boy" [remix]
6. "Junk" [remix]

Side Two

1. "Infatuation/Memories"
2. "Close to the Edge"
3. "I Feel Love Medley" ["Love To Love You Baby"/"I Feel Love"/"Johnny Remember Me" with Marc Almond]
4. "Cadillac Car"

Tracks 1, 2, and 4 on side two are B-sides of the "Smalltown Boy", "Ain't Necessarily So" and "Why?" singles, respectively

=== CD ===
1. "Heat Wave" [remix] - 5:44
2. "Why" [remix] - 6:17
3. "Run from Love" - 8:14
4. "Hard Rain" - 7:52
5. "Smalltown Boy" [remix] - 5:54
6. "Junk" [remix] - 6:14
7. "Infatuation/Memories" - 7:08
8. "Close to the Edge" - 4:43
9. "I Feel Love Medley" ["Love To Love You Baby"/"I Feel Love"/"Johnny Remember Me" with Marc Almond] - 9:43
10. "Cadillac Car" - 8:11

Tracks 7, 8, and 10 are B-sides of the "Smalltown Boy", "Ain't Necessarily So" and "Why?" singles, respectively

=== 2012 re-release CD ===
1. "Heatwave" [Goldberg remix] - 5:43
2. "Why?" [Goldberg remix] - 6:18
3. "Run from Love" [Meita remix] - 8:17
4. "Hard Rain" [Goldberg remix] - 8:11
5. "Smalltown Boy" [Goldberg remix] - 6:03
6. "Junk" [Goldberg remix] - 6:06
7. "I Feel Love" [Fruit Mix] - 8:24
8. "Hard Rain" [demo] - 4:15
9. "Screaming" [demo] - 4:56
10. "Signs (And Wonders)" - 2:53
11. "The Potato Fields" - 2:53
12. "Run from Love" [radio version] - 4:01
13. "Puit d'amour" - 1:36
14. "Close to the Edge" - 4:43
15. "Cadillac Car" - 3:54

== Singles ==
- "I Feel Love Medley" (1985)
- "Run from Love" (1985) - promo only

== Charts ==
Chart (1985 – 1986)	Peak position
European Albums	71
UK Albums Chart	24
US Hot Dance Club Play	18
