= Twisted (Wayne G song) =

1997 single by Wayne G

Single by Wayne G featuring Stewart Who

from the album Through the K-Hole
- Released: 1997
- Genre: Hard House, House
- Length: 3:49
- Label: It's Fabulous! Records
- Songwriter(s): Wayne G, Stewart Who?
- Producer(s): Wayne G, Stewart Who?

Wayne G featuring Stewart Who singles chronology
"Twisted" (1997)	"Breakdance" / "Debauchery" (1999)

"Twisted" is a song written and recorded by British act Wayne G featuring Stewart Who?. It was released as a single in 1997 and peaked at number 19 on the Australian ARIA Singles Chart and was certified gold.

== Track listings ==
UK Vinyl single

1. "Twisted" (6am Warriors Mix)
2. "Twisted" (Accapella)
3. "Twisted" (Truelove's Lectrolux Mix)
4. "Twisted" (Instrumental)

Australian CD single (665731 2)

1. "Twisted" (Betty Ford Radio Edit) - 3:47
2. "Twisted" (Do You Fuck As Good As You Dance Edit) - 3:00
3. "Twisted" (6am Warriors Mix) - 7:50
4. "Twisted" (Danny Tenaglia Club Mix) - 10:50
5. "Twisted" (Sharp Remix) - 8:08

== Charts ==
=== Weekly charts ===
Chart (1998)	Peak position
Australia (ARIA)	19

=== Year-end charts ===
Chart (1998)	Position
Australia (ARIA)	56

== Certifications ==
Region	Certification	Certified units/sales
Australia (ARIA)	Gold	35,000^{^}
^{^} Shipments figures based on certification alone.
