= Michael Laub =

Stage director

Michael Laub (born 1953, in Belgium) is an avant-garde stage director, contemporary dance choreographer and video artist. His work has notably been shown at the Venice Biennale of 1984, the Festival d'Avignon of 2005, the Burgtheater in 2011, and several times at ImPulsTanz Vienna International Dance Festival and Hebbel am Ufer (HAU) Berlin. He has often been described as a minimalist and "one of the founding fathers of anti-illusionist theater".

== Career ==
Laub's career began in the mid-1970s when based in Stockholm, founding and co-directing Maniac Productions with Edmundo Za. Their work was referred to as innovative; mixing Performance art and Video installation. Genevieve van Cauwenberge observed that the performances "are in fact polyvalent and difficult to classify. They make use of everything at once, combining their specific language, stage direction, plastic arts (Minimal Art), musical composition (repetitive sampling) body language (Body Art), Happening (intervention of hazard) and of course the electronic video image."

With the founding of Remote Control Productions in 1981, Michael Laub proceeded to take his work somewhat closer to theater. Influenced by various forms, ranging from soap operas to classic literature and dance, his output as director of Remote Control Productions currently stands at over thirty plays. In what is perhaps something of an oversimplification of his extensive body of work, one can divide the material by three thematic approaches; the musical (Rough, Solo, Daniel and the Dancers, Total Masala Slammer); classic literature (Frank Wedekind's Lulu, Frankula, The Hans Christian Andersen Project); and portrait work (Portraits 360 Seconds, Out of Sorts, Alone/Gregoire, and The Biography Remix with Marina Abramović). One constant, since Rewind Song in 1989, has been the collaboration between Remote Control Productions and musician Larry Steinbachek, formerly of the band Bronski Beat.

Many theater critics have noted the convention challenging nature of Laub's work. When reviewing Daniel and the Dancers one writer commented that "the theatrical illusion has been destroyed, and what is happening on stage is simply a new reality." Deconstructing theater, finding novel ways in which to reconfigure the elements of a performance, is what fascinates and distinguishes this artist. A review pertaining to the same piece in the Danish newspaper Politiken attributes a certain violence to this theatrical approach. "This is masterful comedy," writes Monna Dithmer, "-served by the Laub diva Charlotte Engelkes-and a masterclass in the Laub technique, the aim of which is to smash the whole theatre process into bits and pieces and display them in all their naked glory."

It was only in the mid nineties, and in particular with the success of the play Rough, that Michael Laub/Remote Control Productions garnered international recognition. As a result, the ensuing works became more elaborate in scope and far-reaching in audience. An example of this was Laub's play Total Masala Slammer/Heartbreak No. 5 (2001), in which six months of research in India brought his fascination with Bollywood, Kathak dance and music into a synthesis with Goethe and Western contemporary live art forms. The H.C. Andersen Project (2003) was another ambitious project that used a multitude of biographical and literary interpretations in exploring Laub's take on the famous Danish subject. The Austrian daily Der Standard lauded the resulting mash-up, stating the play's "masterful blend of condensed fairytales, biographical notes, and exquisitely transfigured personae from Andersen’s universe is achieved through clarity of dramatic structure, the lightness of the 'show' form, the outstanding dancers and performers, and the subtle music of Larry Steinbachek".

Between the large-scale productions of Total Masala Slammer and The H.C. Andersen Project, Laub directed Portraits 360 Sek at Hamburg's Deutsches Schauspielhaus in 2002 which was commissioned by Tom Stromberg. This was an undertaking which would spur his long-standing fascination with the applications of portraiture in theater to evolve. Having experienced success with solo portraits (Solo with Charlotte Engelkes, and Out of Sorts with Richard Crane), Laub began, with Portraits 360 Sek to extend the idea to a collective performance, and in time, a serialized concept.

For the Laub portrait of the performance artist Marina Abramović in The Biography Remix (2004-'05), content called for a multi-layered format; "One moment you are watching the young Abramović on video, the next Abramović played by one of her young students, then Abramović in the flesh", but the object remained grounded in a very direct approach. While one critic noted that "above all one remembers authentic emotion, which culminated in the final glimpse of a smile from the artist. It is beautiful, very beautiful; terribly intimate; and perfectly universal." Libération concluded that "The Remix is generally as disturbing as it is moving". A quality one would anticipate, even aspire to, in a performance chronicling the life and work of an artist who has spent decades pushing the boundaries of physical and emotional endurance.

360 Sek and the ensuing Portrait Series projects (there have been five to date) eschew almost all theatrics and strip the performer's role down to often uncomfortably intimate biographical details. "By linking the unstructured with the well-calculated, the director subtly conveys to the audience some idea of those elements of which theatre is composed: exuberance and effort, yearning and application, happiness and fear. Yet because the individual portraits are so direct, as an exercise in vanity this self-portraiture remains modest. The quietly non-intentional gets the same six short minutes as the noisily exhibitionist, and that is why, in the final resort, the theatre emerges victorious as a powerhouse of the imagination as opposed to a factory of personalities." The focus is on realism and authenticity. This is made all the more evident with Laub often favoring non-professionals for these projects, as their untrained stage personae are all the more vulnerable and raw.

The Portrait Series have proven popular, in part due to the concept's adaptability. From a theoretical point of view, The Portrait Series is an endeavor wherein he tests theater's global vocabulary. The idea being that virtually any entity comprising interesting characters can be formatted by Laub for a Portrait Series show.

He opened 2010 with the highly personal, original composition Death, Dance and some Talk in Berlin (February), followed by Portrait Series Istanbul (April–May), Portrait Series Rotterdam (September), and commencing work on the Burgporträts at the Burgtheater, Vienna.

After opening the Burgporträts (March) in 2011, Michael Laub's attentions shifted to the emerging arts scene in Cambodia. For the past five years he has embarked on a series of projects exploring traditional and contemporary Cambodian artistic expression. The Portrait Series Battambang began in 2012 in conjunction with Phare Ponleu Selpak, and culminated in the Galaxy Khmer tour collaboration with the rock band Cambodian Space Project, bringing these distinct voices to Europe two years later.

2016 began with the opening of the solo performance Asutorito Endoruwaito (January) in Berlin's Hebbel am Ufer, which was followed by Dance Portraits - Cambodia opening at ImPulsTanz Vienna International Dance Festival and the Weltmuseum Wien (February).

In 2017, the world premier of Fassbinder, Faust and the Animists was shown at Hebbel am Ufer (HAU) Berlin and opened the ImPulsTanz Festival in Vienna the same year. In the piece, Laub recreates and analyses Fassbinder’s cult film Beware of a Holy Whore with a 17-person ensemble on an empty white video-wall stage.

With Rolling, 2019, Laub continued the disposition of intertwining film and theater on stage and conceived a play that was entirely composed out of over 200 film excerpts staged in a roughly two-hour piece, it premiered at Hebbel am Ufer (HAU) Berlin and toured ImPulsTanz Festival in Vienna the same year.

Michael Laub is founder and artistic director of the artist in residency programme The Umbrellas of Phnom Penh (TUOPP). From 2017-18 TUOPP was a unique structure in Phnom Penh that accommodated residencies for international artists and local creatives from different fields of practice including visual artists, video/film makers, dancers, choreographers, sound artists and designers. In addition to his stage-work, Laub has held several guest professorships (at the University of Giessen, the Free University Berlin, the Norwegian Theatre Academy), as well as a residency at HfG Karlsruhe in 2011. In 2020 he held the Valeska Gert Guestprofessorship at Free University Berlin’s MA Dance Sciences for a second time after teaching there in 2006/07.

In 2021 he publishes Rewind Song, a book in which he remixes images and text from past works in a non-chronological order.

Incorporating video, dance and media art in his performative work practice since the seventies, he now transferred those encounters into his first mid-length film The Post Confinement Travelogue (2023).

From 2023 to 2026, he conceived a trilogy in Cambodia, produced by the French Institute of Cambodia and Phare Ponleu Selpak. The trilogy consists of Madison Now, a choreographic work blending classical Apsara with the Madison, a dance that remains popular in Cambodia, where it has developed its own distinct style since the 1960s. Snapping 2025/Snapdance, a multiscreen portrait video and sound installation. A Little Bit All Over The Place, a video dance work that combines and juxtaposes traditional Khmer dance with TikTok, karaoke, and other forms of social media culture.

== Works ==
=== Maniac Productions ===
- 1975
  Maniac Productions, Narren Teater, Stockholm
- 1976
  Enfantillage, Fylkingen Center for Intermedia, Stockholm
  Paralysed Infancy in Repetitive Structure, De Appel, Amsterdam

Avant Tehran, De Appel, Amsterdam

- 1977
  Mouse in Repetitive Structure, Avant Tehran Mickery Theatre, Amsterdam
  Lily is going to have a baby, Fylkingen Center for Intermedia, Stockholm
  Infection/Love Tape I, Video Festival, Fylkingen, Stockholm
- 1978
  Tragico Intervallo, Kunstakademie, Düsseldorf
  Tragico Intervallo II, Arteferia Post Avant-Garde Theater Festival, Bologna
  Maniac Productions II, Mickery, Amsterdam
  I closed the window and I went out for dinner, Folkwang Museum, Essen/Galerie Neu, Aachen
  Hotel Life (a 12-hour live video exhibition in 12 hotel rooms), Museumzicht Hotel, Amsterdam
  Untitled Video Performance, International Performance Festival, Beursschouwburg, Brussels
- 1979
  Dinner Somewhere and then Back to my room RTBF Television, Kolnischer Kunstverein, Cologne/Theatre Populaire de Wallonie, Lieg
  Chap Tapes I, Internationaal Cultureel Centrum, Antwerp
- 1980
  Chap Tapes II, Mickery, Amsterdam

=== Remote Control Productions ===
- 1981
  Snapping, Computing and Performing
  Kulturhuset, Stockholm
- 1982
  White Out
  Moderna Museet, Stockholm
- 1984
  Return of Sensation
  XXXII Biennale di Venezia
  Kulturhuset, Stockholm
  International Theatre Festival, Copenhagen, June 1985
- 1987
  Pressure
  Kulturhuset, Stockholm
- 1989
  Rewind Song
  Moderna Museet, Stockholm, February
  6th Bergen International Theatre Festival, Norway
- 1991
  Fast Forward/ Bad Air und so...
  Dansens Hus, Stockholm, February
  Theater am Turm, Frankfurt, February
  Bergen International Theatre, April
  Touch Time Festival, Mickery, Amsterdam, May
  Kaaitheater, Brussels, June
  Wiener Festwochen, Vienna, June
- 1992
  Jack's Travelogue/La Prison des Femmes
  Black Box Theatre, Oslo, May
  Teatro Central, Seville Expo '92, June
  Dansens Hus, Stockholm, August
  Theater am Turm, Frankfurt, October
  Kaaitheater/Theatre 140, Brussels, November
- 1994
  Rough
  Kulturhuset, Stockholm, January
  Teatergarasjen, Bergen, January
  Springdance, Utrecht, April
  Theater am Turm, Frankfurt, April
  Szene, Salzburg, July
  Internationales Sommer Theater Festival, Hamburg, July
  Theatre 140/ Charleroi Danse, Brussels, November
  Nordisk Scenekunst Festival, Arhus, April
  Europaisches Festival Schlossfestspiele, Schwerin, June
  Ludwigsburg Schlossfestspiele, July
  Hebbel Theater, Berlin, August
- 1994-'96
  Daniel and the Dancers
  Frascati, Amsterdam, October, 1994
  Monty, Antwerpen, January, 1995
  Lantaren, Rotterdam, January, 1995
  Schouwburg, Tilburg, January, 1995
  Dansens Hus, Stockholm, February, 1995
  Theater am Turm, Frankfurt, February, 1996
  Hebbel Theater, Berlin, March 1996
  Kanon Hallen, Copenhagen, March 1996
- 1995-'96
  Solo with Charlotte Engelkes
  Spielart, Munich, October 1995
  Theater am Turm, Frankfurt, February 1996
  Hebbel Theater, Berlin, May 1996
  Szene, Salzburg, July 1996
  Monty, Antwerp, October 1996
  Schouwburg, Tilburg, October 1996
  Kulturhuset Arhus, November 1996
- 1997-'98
  Planet Lulu
  Kulturhus Arhus, March 1997
  Springdance, Utrecht, April 1997
  Theater am Turm, Frankfurt, May 1997
  Hebbel Theater, Berlin, May 1997
  Szene, Salzburg, July 1997
  Zürcher Theater Spektakel, Zurich, September 1997
  Kampnagel, Hamburg, September 1997
  Grand Theater, Groningen, September 1997
  De Brakke Grond, Amsterdam, October 1997
  Schouwburg, Tilburg, October 1997
  Pusterviksteatern, Gotheborg, October 1998
  Dansens Hus, Stockholm, October 1998
- 1998-'99
  Frankula
  Grand Theatre, Groningen, August 1998
  TANZtheaterInternational, Hanover, September 1998
  Frascati, Amsterdam, September 1998
  Schouwburg, Tilburg, February 1999
  Hebbel Theater, February/March 1999
  Szene, Salzburg, July 1999
- 1999-2000
  Out of Sorts
  De Brakke Grond, Amsterdam, April 1999
  Grand Theatre, Groningen, April 1999
  Szene, Salzburg, July 1999
  Expo, Hanover, September 1999
  Schouwburg, Tilburg, October 1999
  Mousonturm, Frankfurt, February 2000
- 2000-'03
  Pigg in Hell
  Tanz im August, Berlin, 2000
  Podewil, Berlin, 2001
  Mousonturm, Frankfurt, 2001
  off limits Festival, Dortmund, 2001
  Rotterdamse Schouwburg, 2001
  euro-scene, Leipzig, 2001
  Tramway, Glasgow, 2002
  Impulstanz, Vienna, 2002
  Tanzwerkstatt, Munich, 2002
  Zürcher Theater Spektakel, Zurich, 2002
  Four Days in Motion, 6th International Theater Festival, Prague, 2002
  cutting edge, Staatstheater Darmstadt, 2003
- 2001-'02
  Total Masala Slammer/Heartbreak No. 5
  Tanz im August, Hebbel-Theater, Berlin, 2001
  Archa Theater, Prague, 2001
  Zürcher Theater Spektakel, Zurich, 2001
  Rotterdamse Schouwburg, 2001
  Szene, Salzburg, 2002
  Impulstanz, Vienna, 2002
  Melbourne Festival, 2002
- 2002
  Portraits 360 Sek
  Deutsches Schauspielhaus(German) Hamburg, 2002
- 2003
  The H.C. Andersen Project- Tales and Costumes
  Zürcher Theater Spektakel, Zurich, 2003
  Hebbel Theater, Berlin, 2003
  Rotterdamse Schouwburg, 2003
  Exodus Festival, Cankargev Dom, Ljubljana, 2004
  Dance, Munich, 2004
  Mousonturm, Frankfurt, 2005
  Rencontre Choreographique de Seine St. Denis, 2005
- 2004-'05
  The Biography Remix with Marina Abramović
  Romaeuropa, Rome, 2004
  Festival d'Avignon, 2005
- 2004
  Alone
  Zürcher Theater Spektakel, Zurich
- 2004-'09
  Portrait Series: Alone/Gregoire
  Deutsches Schauspielhaus(German) Hamburg, 2004
  De Internationale Keuze van de Rotterdamse Schouwburg, Rotterdam, 2004
  Tanz im August, Internationales Tanzfest Berlin, 2005
  Tanzquartier, Vienna, 2005
  Mousonturm, Frankfurt, 2006
  Rencontre Choreographique de Seine St. Denis, 2006
  Festival d'Otono, Madrid, 2007
  Sommer Szene, Salzburg, 8–9 July 2009
- 2007–present
  Portrait Series Berlin. Professional and Non-Professional Dancers/Marching Series (work in progress)
  Tanz im August, Internationales Tanzfest Berlin, 2007
  Zürcher Theater Spektakel, Zurich, 2007
  Rotterdamse Schouwburg, 2007
- 2008
  Bruce and More
  Heli Meklin & Michael Laub
  Moving in November Festival, Kiasma Museum, Helsinki, November
- 2010
  Death, Dance and Some Talk
  Sophiensaele, Berlin, 23–27 February
- Portrait Series Istanbul: Aspiring Actresses, and Actresses.
  Garajistanbul, 28–30 April, 6 –8 May
  Kulturhauptstadt Europas RUHR.Favoriten, Essen, 26–28 November
- Portrait Series Rotterdam
  Lantern/Venster (Schouwburg Internationale Keuze Festival), 15–19 September
- 2011
  Portrait Series/Burgportäts
  Burgtheater, Vienna
- 2012
  Portrait Series Battambang
  Phare Ponleu Selpak, Battambang, Cambodia.
- 2014
  Galaxy Khmer / Portrait Series Battambang
  16-18 January HAU Hebbel am Ufer, Berlin
  23-24 January

BIT Teatergarasjen, Bergen

- 2016
  Asturito Endoruwaito
  HAU Hebbel am Ufer, Berlin
- Dance Portraits - Cambodia
  ImPulsTanz Festival Vienna
  Weltmuseum Wien
- 2017
  Fassbinder, Faust and the Animists
  HAU Hebbel am Ufer Berlin
  ImPulsTanz Festival Vienna
- 2019
  Rolling
  HAU Hebbel am Ufer Berlin
  ImPulsTanz Festival Vienna

== Literature ==
- Michael Laub, Miriam Schmidtke (Ed.): Rewind Song. Tartin Editionen, Salzburg 2021, ISBN 978-3902163707.
