= Hit That Perfect Beat =

1985 single by Bronski Beat

Single by Bronski Beat

from the album Truthdare Doubledare
- B-side: "I Gave You Everything"
- Released: 11 November 1985
- Genre: Hi-NRG
- Length: 3:38
- Label: Forbidden Fruit; London
- Songwriters: Steve Bronski; John Foster; Larry Steinbachek
- Producer: Adam Williams

Bronski Beat singles chronology
| "I Feel Love" (1985) | "Hit That Perfect Beat" (1985) | "C'mon! C'mon!" (1986) |

Audio
- "Hit That Perfect Beat" on YouTube

"Hit That Perfect Beat" is a song by British synth-pop band Bronski Beat from their second album, Truthdare Doubledare (1986). It reached number three on the UK Singles Chart in January 1986 and entered the top 10 in Australia, South Africa, and several European countries.

== Music video ==
The video for the song featured frontman and vocalist John Foster in the video seeking to join the group after reading an advert in a newspaper and fronts an audition to join the group. The video also features the other two band members playing with Foster at a Liverpool club called "The State" as well as scenes from in and around Stanley Dock, and flashes from the 1985 film Letter to Brezhnev.

== Track listings ==
7-inch single
| No. | Title | Length |
|---|---|---|
| 1. | "Hit That Perfect Beat" |
| 2. | "I Gave You Everything" |

UK, Australasian, and Japanese 12-inch single
| No. | Title | Length |
|---|---|---|
| 1. | "Hit That Perfect Beat" (extended version) | 6:25 |
| 2. | "I Gave You Everything" | 4:00 |

UK 12-inch single (Instant mix)
| No. | Title | Length |
|---|---|---|
| 1. | "Hit That Perfect Beat" (Instant mix) |
| 2. | "Hit That Perfect Beat" (Instant dub) |
| 3. | "I Gave You Everything" |

UK 12-inch single (Metropolitan version)
| No. | Title | Length |
|---|---|---|
| 1. | "Hit That Perfect Beat" (Metropolitan version) |
| 2. | "Hit That Perfect Beat" (Instant dub) |
| 3. | "I Gave You Everything" |

US 12-inch single
| No. | Title | Length |
|---|---|---|
| 1. | "Hit That Perfect Beat" (remix) | 8:26 |
| 2. | "Hit That Perfect Beat" (original mix) | 6:25 |
| 3. | "Hit That Perfect Beat" (dub) | 7:10 |

Canadian 12-inch single
| No. | Title | Length |
|---|---|---|
| 1. | "Hit That Perfect Beat" (extended version) |
| 2. | "Hit That Perfect Beat" (Instant mix) |

== Charts ==
=== Weekly charts ===
| Chart (1985–1986) | Peak position |
|---|---|
| Australia (Kent Music Report) | 3 |
| Austria (Ö3 Austria Top 40) | 11 |
| Belgium (Ultratop 50 Flanders) | 23 |
| Canada Top Singles (RPM) | 91 |
| Europe (European Hot 100 Singles) | 8 |
| Ireland (IRMA) | 5 |
| Italy (Musica e dischi) | 5 |
| Netherlands (Dutch Top 40) | 16 |
| Netherlands (Single Top 100) | 19 |
| South Africa (Springbok Radio) | 5 |
| Switzerland (Schweizer Hitparade) | 3 |
| UK Singles (Official Charts) | 3 |
| West Germany (GfK) | 4 |

=== Year-end charts ===
| Chart (1986) | Position |
|---|---|
| Australia (Kent Music Report) | 20 |
| Europe (European Hot 100 Singles) | 77 |
| Switzerland (Schweizer Hitparade) | 29 |
| West Germany (Media Control) | 32 |

== Certifications ==
| Region | Certification | Certified units/sales |
|---|---|---|
| United Kingdom (BPI) | Silver | 250,000^{^} |
^{^} Shipments figures based on certification alone.

== In other media ==
The song appears in Metallica's 1992 documentary A Year and a Half in the Life of Metallica, showcasing the recording of their Eponymous fifth studio album. During the credits, a scene showing drummer Lars Ulrich and guitarist Kirk Hammett dancing to the song as bassist Jason Newsted bobs his head comedically.
