= Geoff Goddard =

English songwriter, singer and instrumentalist (1937–2000)

- Born: Geoffrey Goddard; 19 November 1937; Reading, Berkshire, England
- Died: 15 May 2000 (aged 62)
- Genre: Pop music
- Occupations: Songwriter, singer, musician
- Instruments: Viola, piano
- Years active: 1960 - c.1966

Geoffrey "Geoff" Goddard (19 November 1937 – 15 May 2000) was an English songwriter, singer and instrumentalist. Working for Joe Meek in the early 1960s, he wrote songs for Heinz, Mike Berry, Gerry Temple, the Tornados, Kenny Hollywood, the Outlaws, Freddie Starr, Screaming Lord Sutch, the Ramblers and John Leyton. His song for Leyton, "Johnny Remember Me", reached number 1 in the UK Singles Chart.

By the mid-1960s Goddard had fallen out with Meek. Disillusioned with the music industry, he withdrew from it to work in catering.

== Early life ==
Goddard was born in Reading, Berkshire, England. He sang in choir in a local church before going on to study the viola and piano at the Royal Academy of Music in London.

== Career ==
Following national service, Goddard sought to move into popular music, and met Meek. He initially attempted to establish himself as a Russ Conway/Liberace styled singer-pianist under the stage-name "Anton Hollywood". Meek promoted him, but he was unable to achieve success.

Eventually Goddard released his solo records under his real name. He recorded four singles as solo artist, produced by Meek, on which he sang with his distinctive regional accent:

- "Girl Bride" / "For Eternity" His Master's Voice POP 938 October 1961
- "My Little Girl's Come Home" / "Try Once More" His Master's Voice POP 1068 September 1962
- "Saturday Dance" / "Come Back To Me" His Master's Voice POP 1160 May 1963
- "Sky Men" / "Walk With Me My Angel" His Master's Voice POP 1213 October 1963

The Oxford label CD also featured seven of the above named tracks ("Sky Men" being the exception), plus Goddard's demo of his song, "My Friend Bobby".

Goddard's best known efforts were as a songwriter. The first project he worked on for Meek was the instrumental "Lone Riders" for the Flee-Rekkers. He then wrote "Johnny Remember Me" for John Leyton. It became a number one hit single in the UK Singles Chart. Goddard also played keyboards on various of Meek's productions, most notably another chart-topper, the Tornados' "Telstar", and wrote and performed on the hit single's flip side, "Jungle Fever."

Despite his track record as a songwriter, Goddard withdrew from the music industry after falling out with Meek. He brought a breach of copyright case in 1965 against Meek concerning the Honeycombs' hit "Have I The Right?", written by Ken Howard and Alan Blaikley. Goddard said that it borrowed from his earlier song "Give Me The Chance". Goddard was unwilling to testify personally and lost the case.

Subsequently, Goddard returned to his home town and worked for 20 years in the catering department of the University of Reading. In 1985, the royalties and the platinum disc from the Marc Almond/Bronski Beat cover version of "Johnny Remember Me", having sold over 300,000 copies, came as a complete surprise to him.

== Death ==
Goddard died from a heart attack in May 2000, at the age of 62. In the film Telstar: The Joe Meek Story (2008), Goddard was portrayed by Tom Burke. A memorial plaque was unveiled in 2013 at Park House on the University of Reading campus by John Leyton, actor and musician.

== Releases as songwriter (RGM productions) ==
- The Flee-Rekkers – "Lone Rider" – Pye 7N35006 A-side (June 1961)
- John Leyton – "Johnny Remember Me" – Top Rank JAR577 A (July 1961)
- Mike Berry & The Outlaws – "Tribute to Buddy Holly" – His Master's Voice POP 912 A (September 1961)
- John Leyton – "Wild Wind" – Top Rank JAR585 A (September 1961)
- Gerry Temple – "Seventeen Come Sunday" – His Master's Voice POP 939 A (October 1961)
- John Leyton – "Voodoo Woman" – His Master's Voice CLP1497 Album (November 1961)
- John Leyton – "Oh Lover" – His Master's Voice CLP1497 LP (November 1961)
- John Leyton – "Son This Is She" – His Master's Voice POP 956 A (December 1961)
- Mike Berry & The Outlaws – "Little Boy Blue" – His Master's Voice POP 979 B side (January 1962)
- John Leyton – "Lone Rider" – His Master's Voice POP 992 A (March 1962)
- John Leyton – "Lonely City" – His Master's Voice POP 1014 A (April 1962)
- The Tornados – "Jungle Fever" – Decca F11494 B (August 1962)
- John Leyton – "Lonely Johnny" – His Master's Voice POP 1076 A (October 1962)
- Kenny Hollywood – "The Wonderful Story of Love" – Decca F11546 B (December 1962)
- Mike Berry & The Outlaws – "Don't You Think It's Time" – His Master's Voice POP 1105 A (December 1962)
- The Outlaws – "Texan Spiritual" – His Master's Voice POP 1124 B (February 1963)
- Toby Ventura – "If My Heart Were A Storybook" – Decca F11581 A (February 1963)
- Mike Berry & The Outlaws – "My Little Baby" – His Master's Voice POP 1142 A (March 1963)
- Freddie Starr & The Midnighters – "Who Told You" – Decca F11663 A (May 1963)
- Heinz – "Just Like Eddie" – Decca F11693 A (July 1963)
- John Leyton – "On Lover's Hill" – His Master's Voice POP 1204 LP (September 1963)
- Screaming Lord Sutch – "Monster in Black Tights" – Decca F11747 B (September 1963)
- Pamela Blue – "My Friend Bobby" – Decca F11761 A (October 1963)
- Heinz – "Country Boy" – Decca F11768 A (November 1963)
- The Ramblers – "Dodge City" – Decca F11775 A (November 1963)
- Heinz – "You Were There" – Decca F11831 A (February 1964)
- Heinz – "Hush-A-Bye" – Decca LK4599 LP (March 1964)
- Cliff Richard – "My Head Goes Round" - EMI Columbia SCX6435 LP Tracks 'n Grooves (November 1970)
