= Larry Steinbachek =

English singer-songwriter (1960–2016)

- Steinbachek in 1985

Background information
- Born: 6 May 1960; London, England
- Died: 7 December 2016 (aged 56)
- Occupations: Singer; songwriter; director; composer
- Instruments: Keyboards; synthesizers; piano; percussion; vocals
- Formerly of: Bronski Beat

Larry Steinbachek (6 May 1960 – 7 December 2016) was an English-singer songwriter, director and composer best known for his time as part of Bronski Beat with Jimmy Somerville and Steve Bronski.

== Early life ==
Steinbachek was born in London on 6 May 1960. He worked as an electrician and was studying to be a musician prior to forming Bronski Beat with Jimmy Somerville and Steve Bronski.

== Career ==
Steinbachek joined Bronski Beat in 1983 and was one of the songwriters for most of the band's songs such as "Smalltown Boy", "Why?" and "Hit That Perfect Beat". He and the band also collaborated with Marc Almond on a medley cover of both "I Feel Love" and "Johnny, Remember Me". Somerville left the band in 1985 to form The Communards with Richard Coles who also worked with Bronski Beat. Steinbachek and Bronski were then joined by both John Foster (who sang on "Hit That Perfect Beat") and Jonathan Hellyer (who sang on "I Love Nightlife"). In 1995, Steinbachek left the band and was replaced by Ian Donaldson.

After leaving Bronski Beat, Steinbachek moved to Amsterdam and then back to England. He worked as a composer and theatre director until his death. He was involved in the 2015 movie, Chappie where he was one of the composers of the soundtrack. He co-wrote "Beat Boy" with former-Bronski Beat member Steve Bronski and it was sung by the alternative hip hop group, Die Antwoord. He also became the musical director for Michael Laub's theatre company, Remote Control Productions, in 1995 following his departure from Bronski Beat.

== Personal life and death ==
Steinbachek had a sister. He was openly gay. He died in 2016 after a short battle with cancer at the age of 56.
