= It Ain't Necessarily So =

Song by George and Ira Gershwin from Porgy and Bess

"It Ain't Necessarily So" is a popular song with music by George Gershwin and lyrics by his brother Ira Gershwin. The song comes from the Gershwins' opera Porgy and Bess (1935) where it is sung by the character Sportin' Life, a drug dealer, who expresses his doubt about several statements in the Bible. The song's melody also functions as a leitmotif for Sportin' Life's character.

== Criticism ==
African-American composer Hall Johnson criticized the song for depicting African Americans as "racially out of character".

== Influence of Jewish blessings ==
The Gershwin brothers were Jewish. Composer Jack Gottlieb and musicologist Howard Pollack have noted the influence of Jewish liturgical music in the song. The first and most direct example of this influence occurs at the start of the song: the melody and phrasing is nearly identical to the blessing incanted before reading from the Torah. The words "It ain't necessarily so" stand in place of Bar'chu et adonai ham'vorach, meaning Bless Adonai, who is blessed. This motif repeats multiple times in both, and both include a response from a congregation. While the phrasing of the melody in the blessing varies, it remains strictly in triplets in Gershwin's tune. The song also seems to draw from the tonality of the Jewish prayer mode Adonai malakh (God is King) by emphasizing the minor tenth, the major third, and the minor seventh.

== Versions ==
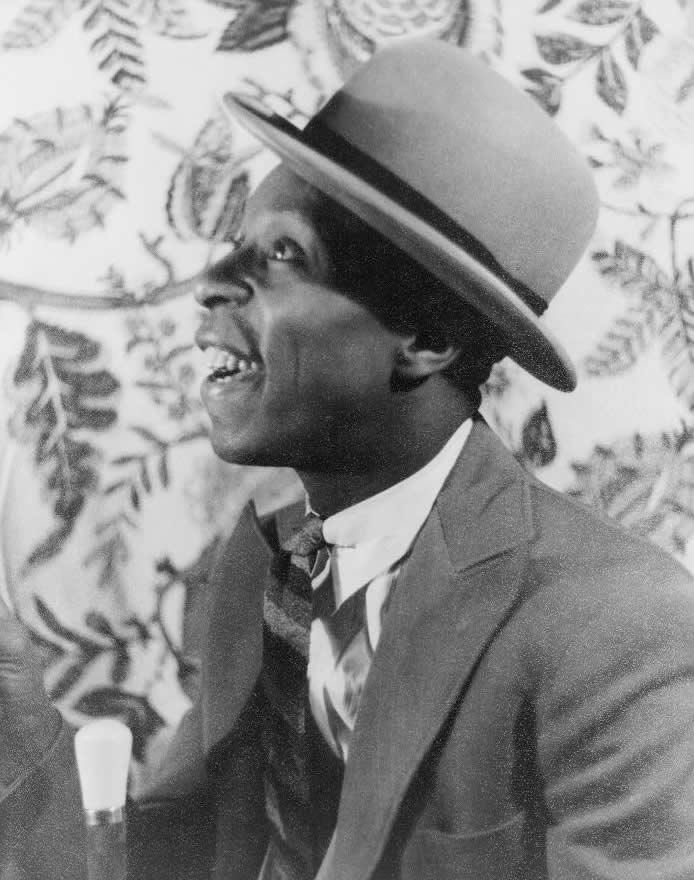
The tap-dancer John W. Bubbles playing Sportin' Life in 1935

The role of Sportin' Life was created by John W. Bubbles. Other notable incarnations of the character include Avon Long and Cab Calloway on stage and Sammy Davis Jr. in the 1959 film.

Early charted versions were by Leo Reisman (1935) and by Bing Crosby (1936). The song was notably sung by Bobby Darin on his 1959 album That's All.

In 1960, Aretha Franklin recorded a cover on her debut studio album, Aretha: With The Ray Bryant Combo for Columbia records.

This song was also covered by a plethora of jazz musicians throughout the 1950s and '60s. In 1952, Oscar Peterson covered it on his album Oscar Peterson Plays George Gershwin. He also covered it as a duet in 1976 with Joe Pass on their album Porgy and Bess. The Cal Tjader Modern Mambo Orchestra recorded it in 1956 for Fantasy Records. In 1955, Ahmad Jamal released a cover on his album Ahmad Jamal Plays. Peggy Lee released a cover of it on her album Black Coffee in 1955. Louis Armstrong and Ella Fitzgerald covered it in their 1958 duet album Porgy and Bess. Lena Horne covered it in 1959 on her duet album with Harry Belafonte, Porgy and Bess. In 1959, Sammy Davis Jr. also released a studio version of the song on his album with Carmen McRae, Porgy and Bess. In 1960, Art Farmer and Benny Golson covered the song on their album Meet the Jazztet. Jazz organist Freddie Roach covered the tune in his 1963 album Good Move!. On her 1963 album Black Christ of the Andes, Mary Lou Williams made a cover of the song.

It was covered a number of times during the rock and roll era. The Honeycombs released a cover of it on their debut album, The Honeycombs in 1964. The next year, the song was a major Australian hit in 1965 for singer Normie Rowe, reaching number five on the Australian singles charts. Also in 1965, The Moody Blues covered the song for their album, The Magnificent Moodies.

Violin virtuoso Jascha Heifetz, close friend of George Gershwin, transcribed the song for violin in 1944. He recorded this version on September 15, 1970, in ORTF Studio 102, Paris, first appearing on the Heifetz on Television album from 1971.

In 1984, the song was released as a single by UK band Bronski Beat with Jimmy Somerville on lead vocals. The song was taken from Bronski Beat's debut album, The Age of Consent and reached number 16 on the UK singles charts.

Other versions include Cher in 1994, Tina May in 1995, Jamie Cullum in 2002, Joe Henderson with Sting in 1997, Brian Wilson on his 2010 Brian Wilson Reimagines Gershwin album and Hugh Laurie on his 2011 album Let Them Talk. In 2014, Spanish jazz singer Pedro Ruy-Blas included the song on his album El Americano.

== Cut verse ==
A verse was cut solely for the use of an encore. The lyrics were:

Way back in 5000 B.C.
Ole Adam an' Eve had to flee
Sure, dey did dat deed in
De Garden of Eden
But why chasterize you an' me?

== Other uses ==
In Nazi-occupied Denmark, the Danish underground interrupted the 1943 Nazi victory radio announcements with a recording of the song.

The philosopher Hilary Putnam used the song as the title of a 1962 paper, later published in The Journal of Philosophy (59:22).

Mad magazine's 1967 race issue featured a parody version with Martin Luther King Jr. singing, "It's not necessarily Stoke! It's not necessarily Stoke! No, him you can't trust in, Just ask Bayard Rustin. Oh it's not necessarily Stoke!", in reference to the civil-rights organizer Stokely Carmichael.

American musician Larry Adler used the song as the title of his 1984 autobiography.

The Jascha Heifetz violin version provided the music for Olympic gold medalist gymnast Natalia Lashchenova's gold medal–winning floor routine at the 1991 Summer Universiade.
