= Why? (Bronski Beat song) =

Single by Bronski Beat

from the album The Age of Consent
- B-side: "Cadillac Car"
- Released: 14 September 1984
- Genre: Disco; hi-NRG; synth-pop; dance-pop; Eurodisco; new wave
- Length: 4:04 (album version); 3:55 (7" version); 7:46 (12" version); 5:11 (12" version, remixed by Steve Bronski and Larry Steinbachek); 6:19 (remix)
- Label: London
- Songwriters: Steve Bronski; Jimmy Somerville; Larry Steinbachek
- Producer: Mike Thorne

Bronski Beat singles chronology
"Smalltown Boy" (1984)	"Why?" (1984)	"It Ain't Necessarily So" (1984)

Music video
- "Why?" on YouTube

"Why?" is a song by British synth-pop band Bronski Beat, released as the second single from their 1984 album The Age of Consent.

The song, recorded at RPM Studio in New York City and mixed at Townhouse Studios in London, pursued an energetic musical formula, while the lyrics focused more centrally on anti-gay prejudice. The song opens with a questioning vocal by frontman and vocalist Jimmy Somerville and the shattering of breaking glass. It was the trio's second top 10 success in the UK, throughout Europe and in Australia and is today considered a popular gay anthem.

== Release ==
"Why?" was released as a single in September 1984 by both Forbidden Fruit and London Records, with "Cadillac Car" included as its B-side. The song debuted at No. 4 on Music & Media's European Airplay Top 50 chart, which was the highest debut on that chart until Madonna's 1987 single, "Who's That Girl".

== Reception ==
Reviewing the song for Melody Maker, Adam Sweeting described it as "all rather twisted and tragic, especially when sung by those painfully keening vocals (the song is dedicated to murdered gay playwright Drew Griffiths). Like Soft Cell before them, the Bronskingtons suit this frugal format better than most, basically because they've had the guts to go the whole hog". Sweeting adds that "what would be predictable electroboredom in more ineffectual outfits here takes on the status of obsession, building busily towards a tense and involving climax".

Reviewing for Smash Hits, Dave Rimmer wrote "this was written for Martin, a friend of the Bronskis who was hounded out of the country by his boyfriend's irate and violent parents" and described it as "a worthy follow-up to "Smalltown Boy"". Dave Ling for Number One agreed with this last point and wrote that the song "could almost be a sequel to their debut, continuing the tale of a young gay suffering humiliation and animosity as he tries to live his life".

In Record Mirror, the song was described as "flowing with unchained melodies, and dealing a deadly double blow to your heart and (shoe) souls" and that "it sounds something akin to Sylvester meets Pigbag in a battle for dancefloor supremacy". John Leland of Spin agreed, "another slice of aerobics bounce music that goes for a burn Jane Fonda never heard of. This cut glistens with the hip smoothness that made Bronski Beat, along with Sade, the most important new act in dance music."

== Track listing ==
12" vinyl US release – MCA Records MCA-23538
No.	Title	Length
1.	"Why?" (extended mix)	7:45
2.	"Why?" (radio edit)	4:04
3.	"Cadillac Car"	7:35

== Charts ==
=== Weekly charts ===
Chart (1984–1985)	Peak position
Australia (Kent Music Report)	10
Belgium (Ultratop 50 Flanders)	3
Canada Top Singles (RPM)	31
Europe (Airplay Top 50)	4
Europe (Eurochart Hot 100)	5
European Airplay Top 50 (Music & Media)	2
France (SNEP)	8
Germany Airplay Top 15	10
Ireland (IRMA)	6
Italy (Musica e dischi)	5
Netherlands (Dutch Top 40)	2
Netherlands (Single Top 100)	6
New Zealand (Recorded Music NZ)	11
South Africa (Springbok Radio)	7
Spain Airplay	2
Spain (AFYVE)	10
Switzerland (Schweizer Hitparade)	7
UK Airplay Top 20	1
UK Singles (Official Charts)	6
US Hot Dance Club Play	27
US Billboard Hot Dance Music/Maxi-Singles Sales	20
West Germany (GfK)	5

=== Year-end charts ===
Chart (1984)	Position
Belgium (Ultratop 50 Flanders)	23
Netherlands (Dutch Top 40)	22
Netherlands (Single Top 100)	26
UK Singles (Gallup)	67
West Germany (Media Control)	72

Chart (1985)	Position
France	46

== Cover versions ==
- In 2006, Steve Angello and Axwell as Supermode released "Tell Me Why", containing lyrics from "Why?" and melodic samples from another Bronski Beat track, "Smalltown Boy".
- British electronic musician Andi Fraggs performed "Why?" in his live shows and named it his "favourite gay anthem".
