= Johnny Remember Me =

Single by John Leyton
- B-side: "There Must Be" (Bob Duke)
- Released: July 1961 (UK)
- Recorded: RGM Sound: 1961
- Genre: Pop
- Label: EMI Top Rank JAR577(UK)
- Songwriter: Geoff Goddard
- Producer: Joe Meek (R.G.M. Sound)

John Leyton singles chronology
"The Girl on the Floor Above" (1960)	"Johnny Remember Me" (1961)	"Wild Wind" (1961)

Official audio
- "Johnny Remember Me" on YouTube

"Johnny Remember Me" is a song first performed by John Leyton in 1961, backed by the Outlaws. It became a 1961 UK singles chart #1. Recounting the haunting – real or imagined – of a young man by his dead lover, the song is one of the most noted of the 'death ditties' that populated the pop charts in the early to mid-1960s. It is distinguished in particular by its eerie, echoing sound (a hallmark of its producer Joe Meek's production style) and by the ghostly, foreboding female wails that form its backing vocal, by Lissa Gray. Despite the line, "the girl I loved who died a year ago" being changed to the more vague "the girl I loved and lost a year ago", the song was banned by the BBC, along with many other 'death discs', which were popular at the time.

== Creation and success ==
The song was written and composed by Geoff Goddard who awoke inspired and sang it straight into the tape recorder which he kept by his bedside. It was arranged by Charles Blackwell and produced by Joe Meek.

At the time of the recording, John Leyton played a rock star called "Johnny Saint-Cyr" in the TV series Harpers West One. In an episode of the show Saint-Cyr performs the song, surrounded by adoring female fans. The television exposure caused the song to become instantly well known. After it was released, it rapidly rose to the number one spot.

== Evaluations ==
On Juke Box Jury in 1961 Spike Milligan dismissed it as "son of 'Ghost Riders in the Sky'", predicting, along with the others on the panel, that it would not be a hit.

In 2012 the journalist Tom Ewing described the song as "the weirdest and most gripping British record to hit the top yet", with Leyton's vocal "clutching at your sleeve, desperate to tell a story of loss and madness. Meek turns the drums into phantom horsemen and fills the record's dark spaces with melodrama – a keening female voice on the chorus rounds the effect off."

== Covers ==
The song was covered in French in 1963 by Les Chats Sauvages as "Johnny Rappelle-Toi".

Finnish versions have been recorded by many artists, including Tapio Rautavaara (1962), Olavi Virta (1962), Topi Sorsakoski (1985), and Kari Tapio (1986).

The song was covered in 1983 by singer John Spencer in Dutch, titled "Johnny, vergeet me niet".

In 1985, Bronski Beat covered the song in a medley with "I Feel Love" and "Love to Love You Baby" in a collaboration with Marc Almond. Released as a single, it reached number 3 in the UK chart and earned Geoff Goddard a platinum disc with sales over 300,000.

It was also covered by the Swedish rocker Little Gerhard and later by Showaddywaddy. In 1983, the British psychobilly band The Meteors released a version on their album Wrecking Crew, followed a couple of years later by Dave Vanian and the Phantom Chords. It was the opening track on the 1993 album Seasons in the Sun by Spell (Rose McDowall and Boyd Rice).

The creation and success of the song plays a significant role in the 2009 film Telstar: The Joe Meek Story in which Goddard is portrayed by Tom Burke and Leyton by Callum Dixon

In 2018, Freddie Dilevi released a cover of the song on the album Teenager's Heartbreak, edited by Family Spree Recordings.
