= John Leyton =

British actor and singer (born 1936)

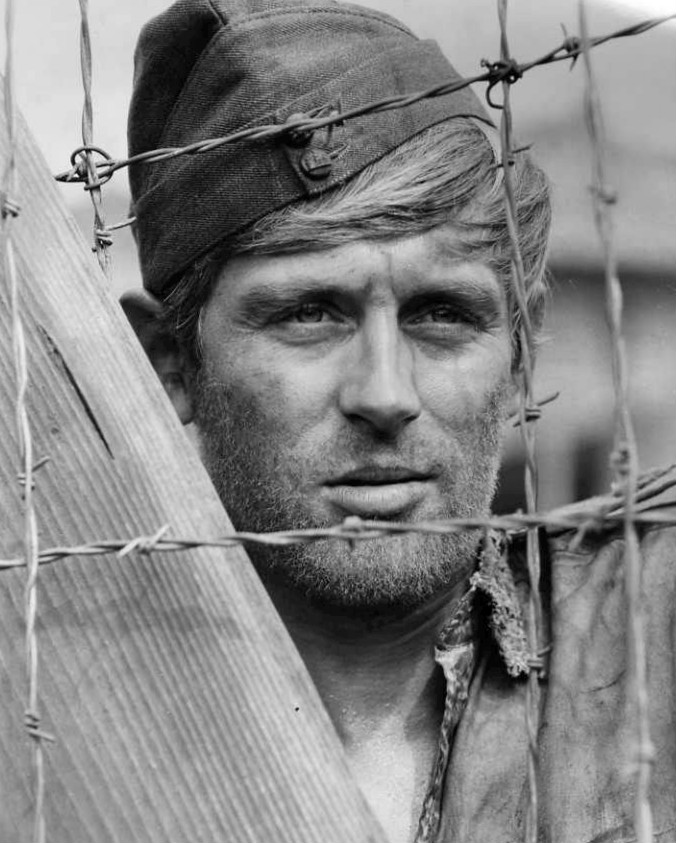
- Leyton as Lt. Orde in Von Ryan's Express, 1965
- Born: John Dudley Leyton; 17 February 1936 (age 90); Frinton-on-Sea, Essex, England
- Occupations: Actor; singer
- Years active: 1959–2015
- Known for: Pte. Wilkes in Guns at Batasi; Flight Lt. William Dickes "Tunnel King"' in The Great Escape
- Spouse: Diana Leyton (m. 1967)
- Children: 2

John Dudley Leyton (born 17 February 1936) is a retired English actor and singer.

As a singer, Leyton is best known for his hit song "Johnny Remember Me" (written by Geoff Goddard and produced by Joe Meek), which reached number one in the UK singles chart in August 1961 despite being banned by the BBC for its death references. His follow-up single, "Wild Wind", reached number two in the same chart.

Alongside singing, Leyton's acting career saw him appearing in television and films throughout the 1960s. His films included: The Great Escape (1963), Guns at Batasi (1964), Von Ryan's Express (1965) and Krakatoa, East of Java (1968). In 2009, he also had a small role in the film Telstar, a biopic based on record producer Joe Meek's life in which Leyton himself was portrayed by Callum Dixon.

== Career ==
Leyton went to Highgate School and after completing his national service with the Royal Army Service Corps, he studied drama, paying his way through drama school with bit-part roles in films and on television. His first major acting role was his portrayal of Ginger in a 1960 Granada TV adaptation of Biggles, which earned him a large following of young female fans and led to the formation of a John Leyton fan club.

=== Singer-actor ===
Following the success of Biggles, Leyton was persuaded by his manager, Robert Stigwood, to audition as a singer for record producer Joe Meek, and subsequently recorded a cover version of "Tell Laura I Love Her", which was released on the Top Rank label. In 1961 though, the Top Rank label was taken over by EMI who then issued Leyton's records on their His Master's Voice label. EMI had already released Ricky Valance's version of the same song. Leyton's recording was withdrawn from sale, whilst Valance's version reached number one in the UK chart.

A second single, "The Girl on the Floor Above", was released on His Master's Voice, but was not a success. His first big hit, "Johnny Remember Me", coincided with his appearance as an actor in the popular ATV television series Harpers West One, in which he played a singer named Johnny Saint Cyr. Leyton performed "Johnny Remember Me" during the show (backed by the Outlaws), and the single subsequently charted at Number 1. His next single, "Wild Wind", reached number two in the UK Singles Chart, and later singles also achieved lower chart positions.

On 15 April 1962, Leyton performed at the NME Poll-Winners Concert at London's Wembley Pool. But in 1963, Meek and Goddard's association with Leyton ended; that circumstance, combined with the British beat boom, cast Leyton adrift immediately, although he found a lot of acting work in television and film to keep him busy. Despite trying to give Leyton's music more of a 'group' sound by giving him a backing group, The LeRoys, his chart career faded out by the beginning of 1964. In that same year, according to the music journalist Bob Stanley, 'Leyton headlined a tour with up and coming support act the Rolling Stones. Very quickly, it became apparent that the Stones were more popular than the headline act and Leyton, with great dignity, abandoned his pop career on the spot to concentrate on acting.'

=== Heyday as an actor ===
Leyton was a familiar face in film and television during the 1960s. He played himself in the 1962 Dick Lester film It's Trad, Dad!, performing his latest single "Lonely City" in a radio studio. In The Great Escape (1963), he played tunnel designer Willie Dickes, one of only three characters to reach freedom. Leyton also cut a single with lyrics to Elmer Bernstein's theme to the film. He also appeared in Guns at Batasi in 1964, Every Day's a Holiday (aka Seaside Swingers in the United States) and Von Ryan's Express starring Frank Sinatra and Trevor Howard in 1965. In Krakatoa, East of Java, in 1969, he played the designer of a diving bell. From 1966 to 1967, Leyton played the lead role as Special Operations Executive (SOE) Royal Navy Lieutenant Nicholas Gage, an expert in demolitions, in Jericho, an American TV series about espionage in the Second World War.

=== Later career ===
Leyton returned to Britain in the early 1970s and tried to re-launch his singing career, signing to the York record label in 1973. A single, "Dancing in the Graveyard" c/w. "Riversong" (York SYK 551) and an album, John Leyton (York FYK 416) were released that year. A year later, Leyton's cover version of the Kevin Johnson hit, "Rock and Roll (I Gave You the Best Years of My Life)", (York YR 210) was issued in the UK but without success. In the mid 1970s, Leyton starred in the ITV television series, The Nearly Man. Acting roles became fewer and farther between during the 1970s, and by the early 1980s, he was no longer active in show business.

In the 1990s, Leyton began performing in the Solid Gold Rock'n'Roll Show, appearing with artists such as Marty Wilde and Joe Brown. The 2004 tour featured Leyton, Showaddywaddy, Freddy Cannon and Craig Douglas. Leyton has also returned to acting, with a cameo appearance in the 2005 film, Colour Me Kubrick starring John Malkovich.

In May 2006, Leyton released "Hi Ho, Come On England", a re-working of Jeff Beck's "Hi Ho Silver Lining", to coincide with the World Cup in Germany. During the summer of 2007, he filmed a cameo appearance for the Nick Moran film, Telstar. Leyton also topped the bill at the Theatre Royal, Windsor, along with 1960s stars Jess Conrad and Craig Douglas, at a concert named '60s Icons'.

Leyton continued to tour the UK and Scandinavia performing his hits (sometimes backed by The Rapiers). In 2014, he toured with his band, the Flames, featuring John Burleigh on guitar, Ray Royal on drums and Charlie Gardner on bass guitar and Jeff Jeffereys on rhythm guitar. After this tour he retired.

Leyton married Diana in 1967 and they had a son and daughter.

== Discography ==
=== Albums ===
- 1961 – The Two Sides of John Leyton (His Master's Voice CLP497)
- 1963 – Always Yours (His Master's Voice CLP1664)
- 1973 – John Leyton (York Records FYK416)
- 1997 – John Leyton Is Back

=== Extended plays ===
- 1962 – John Leyton (Top Rank JKP3016) – "Wild Wind" / "You Took My Love for Granted" / "Johnny Remember Me" / "There Must Be"
- 1962 – The John Leyton Hit Parade (His Master's Voice 7EG8747) – "Lone Rider" / "Son This Is She" / "Lonely City" / "It Would Be Easy"
- 1964 – Beautiful Dreamer (His Master's Voice 7EG8843) – "Beautiful Dreamer" / "On Lovers Hill" / "I'll Cut Your Tail Off" / "Lovers Lane"
- 1964 – Tell Laura I Love Her (His Master's Voice 7EG8854) – "Tell Laura I Love Her" / "The Girl on the Floor Above" / "Johnny Remember Me" / "Wild Wind"
- 1977 – John Leyton (EMI 2699) – "Johnny Remember Me" / "Son This Is She" / "Wild Wind" / "Cupboard Love"

=== Singles ===
Single	Year	Peak chart positions								Label
Single	Year	UK	AUS	BEL (FL)	GER	IRE	NOR	NZ	SWE	Label
"Tell Laura I Love Her"	1960	—	—	—	—	—	—	—	—	Top Rank
"The Girl on the Floor Above"	1960	—	—	—	—	—	—	—	—	His Master's Voice
"Johnny Remember Me"	1961	1	62	19	42	1	4	1	—	Top Rank
"Wild Wind"	1961	2	—	—	—	6	—	—	—	Top Rank
"Son, This Is She"	1961	15	—	—	—	—	—	—	—	His Master's Voice
"Lone Rider"	1962	40	—	—	—	—	—	—	—	His Master's Voice
"Lonely City"	1962	14	72	—	—	—	—	—	—	His Master's Voice
"Down the River Nile"	1962	42	—	—	—	—	—	—	14	His Master's Voice
"Lonely Johnny"	1962	—	—	—	—	—	—	—	—	His Master's Voice
"Cupboard Love"	1963	22	—	—	—	—	—	—	3	His Master's Voice
"I'll Cut Your Tail Off"	1963	36	—	—	—	—	—	—	—	His Master's Voice
"On Lovers Hill"	1963	—	—	—	—	—	—	—	—	His Master's Voice
"Beautiful Dreamer"	1963	—	—	—	—	—	3	—	3	His Master's Voice
"Make Love to Me" (with the Le Roys)	1964	49	—	—	—	—	—	—	15	His Master's Voice
"How Will It End" (Japan-only release)	1964	—	—	—	—	—	—	—	—	Odeon
"Tell Laura I Love Her" (Scandinavia-only release)	1964	—	—	—	—	—	—	—	3	His Master's Voice
"Don't Let Her Go Away"	1964	—	—	—	—	—	—	—	—	His Master's Voice
"All I Want Is You"	1964	—	—	—	—	—	—	—	—	His Master's Voice
"I Don't Care If the Sun Don't Shine" (Sweden-only release)	1965	—	—	—	—	—	—	—	—	His Master's Voice
"Dancing in the Graveyard"	1973	—	—	—	—	—	—	—	—	York
"Rock n' Roll (I Gave You All the Best Years of My Life)"	1974	—	—	—	—	—	—	—	—	York
"Come On England" (with the Rapiers)	2002	—	—	—	—	—	—	—	—	Freddyboy
"—" denotes releases that did not chart or were not released in that territory.

== Selected filmography ==
- Danger Within (1959) – Prisoner (uncredited)
- I'm All Right Jack (1959) – Recruit to Detto (uncredited)
- The Johnny Leyton Touch (1961) (short) - Himself
- It's Trad, Dad! (1962) – Himself
- The Great Escape (1963) – Flt. Lt. William Dickes "The Tunnel King"
- Guns at Batasi (1964) – Private Wilkes
- Every Day's a Holiday (1964) – Gerry Pullman
- Von Ryan's Express (1965) – Lieutenant Orde
- The Idol (1966) – Timothy
- The Legend of Silent Night (TVM, 1968) - Pastor Josef Mohr
- Krakatoa, East of Java (1969) – Rigby
- Fern the Red Deer (1976) – Mr. Gordon
- Schizo (1976) – Alan Falconer
- Dangerous Davies – The Last Detective (TVM, 1981) – Dave Boot
- Colour Me Kubrick (2005) – Lord Charles Benson
- Telstar: The Joe Meek Story (2008) – Sir Edward

== See also ==
- List of artists who reached number one on the UK Singles Chart
