= Smalltown Boy =

1984 single by Bronski Beat

Single by Bronski Beat

from the album The Age of Consent
- B-side: "Memories"; "Infatuation" (12")
- Released: 25 May 1984 (UK)
- Studio: The Garden (London)
- Genre: Synth-pop; hi-NRG; disco
- Length: 5:02 (album version); 3:58 (single version); 9:00 (12" version)
- Label: London
- Songwriters: Steve Bronski; Jimmy Somerville; Larry Steinbachek
- Producer: Mike Thorne

Bronski Beat singles chronology
"Smalltown Boy" (1984)	"Why?" (1984)

Music video
- "Smalltown Boy" on YouTube

"Smalltown Boy" is the debut single by the British synth-pop band Bronski Beat, released in May 1984 by London Recordings. It was included on Bronski Beat's debut album, The Age of Consent (1984).

"Smalltown Boy" features electronic instrumentation, falsetto vocals and lyrics describing a young man who decides to leave home. The music video, directed by Bernard Rose and filmed in East London, depicts a boy who leaves home after being gay-bashed.

"Smalltown Boy" reached number three on the UK singles chart and number one in the Netherlands and Belgium. A gay anthem, it remains associated with the rise of British gay culture in the 1980s. It received positive reviews, and in 2022 Rolling Stone named it the 163rd-greatest dance song. It has been covered by numerous acts, and a series of remixes were issued for the 40th anniversary in 2024.

== Composition ==
"Smalltown Boy" features "ominous" discordant notes, an "electro-pop pulse", and falsetto vocals. According to the Bronski Beat member Larry Steinbachek, it emerged from an attempt to cover the 1977 Sex Pistols song "Pretty Vacant" using an octave pattern sequenced on a Roland MC-202 synthesiser.

The lyrics describe a young man who is bullied and decides to leave home. In the Financial Times, David Gould wrote that it combines the hi-NRG tempo of 1980s gay clubs with "plaintive" lyrics. Ian Wade, the author of 1984: The Year Pop Went Queer, interpreted the line "the love that you need will never be found at home" as a rebuke to the "family values" culture that demonised homosexuality at the time. The singer, Jimmy Somerville, said he was embarrassed by the song for many years, as he felt his lyrics were inferior.

== Music video ==
The music video was directed by Bernard Rose, who had directed the video for "Relax", by Frankie Goes to Hollywood, another band whose co-founders are gay, the previous year. Rose said Bronski Beat felt "Relax" was too mainstream and upbeat, and wanted to convey a more serious message. The Independent described the "Smalltown Boy" video as "stark" and "grounded". The original concept was to base the video on a cottaging scene, but this was vetoed by the London Recordings executive Colin Bell. The video was filmed at a leisure centre in East London.

In the video, a boy (played by Somerville) and his friends are at a leisure centre, watching a young man in swim briefs dive into a pool. When the man smiles, the boy is encouraged and later makes a pass at him in the changing room. However, the man reacts badly, and he and his friends later follow the boy and gay-bash him. As a policeman explains the incident to the boy's parents (outing him in the process), his mother breaks down and his father becomes angry to the point of almost striking the boy, who then resolves to leave his "small town" for London. As he leaves, his mother hugs him, and his father gives the boy some money, though he refuses to shake his son's hand. On the train the boy is joined by other members of Bronski Beat. They smile and laugh as they disembark in London to start their new life.

Rose said the video depicted a common experience for gay people and that Bronski Beat wanted to draw attention to homophobia. Wade likened it to the films of Mike Leigh and Ken Loach. Bell said it created opportunities for later videos with gay themes by artists such as Pet Shop Boys and George Michael.

== Reception ==
Bell was unafraid to market "Smalltown Boy" as a gay record, and said "that was the point". According to Bell, the first time it was played in a gay club, Heaven, in London, the "response was extraordinary" and the audience slowed down to listen. Reviewing the single on release, Spin said it "fashioned a young man's bitter memories of being driven away from home, alienated from his family, and persecuted by his friends, into a sweetly moving pop song".

"Smalltown Boy" reached number three on the UK singles chart and number one in the Netherlands and Belgium. It reached the top 10 in Australia, Canada, France, Ireland, Italy, Switzerland and West Germany. It reached number 48 in the US pop chart and was a number-one US dance hit. After the success, Bronski Beat released their debut album, The Age of Consent.

== In Popular Culture ==
The song is featured on a in game radio in GTA V

== Legacy ==
"Smalltown Boy" is associated with the rise of British gay culture in the 1980s, alongside hits by the closeted George Michael and the openly gay Frankie Goes to Hollywood. Writing in the Observer for its 40th anniversary, Paul Flynn wrote: "'Smalltown Boy' documents in empathetic, kitchen-sink detail the feelings of rejecting one archaic value system and moving to the big gay city to find your own... [It has] resisted fossilisation." He concluded that it "can still make reasonable claims to being the British national anthem of gay", and counted it among the work of other major figures in British gay history, such as Oscar Wilde, Joe Orton, Derek Jarman and Peter Tatchell.

Reviewing the Age of Consent reissue for Pitchfork in 2017, Laura Snapes wrote that "'Smalltown Boy'" remains a perfect song. It is nimble and crushing, forlorn and relieved, frail yet determined." In 2022, Rolling Stone named it the 163rd-greatest dance song, and Time Out ranked it the 12th-best song to celebrate gay pride, writing that it "takes the pain of rejection and makes it danceable". In 2023, Rolling Stone named "Smalltown Boy" the 38th-most inspirational LGBTQ song, and in 2025 Billboard named it the 56th-greatest LGBTQ+ anthem. In 2024, Wade said "Smalltown Boy" was still popular with young people: "There are still some kids who are terrified in their own homes. For the teenager wondering whether they'll get fucked or stabbed by the person they chose to look at across the classroom, 'Smalltown Boy' still means something." Bell said "Smalltown Boy" was the record he was proudest of signing.

A remix by Stephen Hague was released on 24 December 1990. For the song's 30th anniversary in 2014, Somerville released a new version, "Smalltown Boy Reprise". A series of remixes were issued for the 40th anniversary in 2024, and the song became popular on the social media service TikTok. As of 2024, it remains part of British gay culture, and posters with its lyrics were posted across London for the 2024 Pride event.

"Smalltown Boy" was sampled by the German band Real McCoy in their 1994 song "Automatic Lover (Call for Love)". The Swedish DJs Steve Angello and Axwell, as Supermode, sampled "Smalltown Boy" in their 2006 track "Tell Me Why". The German industrial metal band Oomph! paid homage to "Smalltown Boy" in their 2012 song "Kleinstadtboy". In 2015, the American singer Brandon Flowers sampled "Smalltown Boy" in his song "I Can Change", and the Belgian singer Kate Ryan released a cover. In 2020, the gay country singer Orville Peck released a cover of "Smalltown Boy". In 2024, the Knocks and Perfume Genius collaborated on a cover for its 40th anniversary.

== Track listing ==
- 7" single BITE 1
1. "Smalltown Boy" – 3:58
2. "Memories" – 2:55
- 7" single 820 091-7
1. "Smalltown Boy" – 3:58
2. "Memories" – 3:00
- 12" single BITEX 1 / 820 996-1 / 9-29 017 / LDSPX 215
1. "Smalltown Boy" – 9:00
2. "Infatuation/Memories" – 7:38
- 12" single MCA-23521
1. "Smalltown Boy" – 9:00
2. "Infatuation/Memories" – 7:42

== Personnel ==
Credits sourced from Electronic Soundmaker and Sound on Sound.

- Jimmy Somerville – vocals
- Steve Bronski – Yamaha DX7 and Memorymoog synthesisers, Roland MC-202 Microcomposer, LinnDrum programming
- Larry Steinbachek – Pro-One and Memorymoog synthesisers, Roland MC-202 Microcomposer, Linn 9000 programming

== Charts ==
=== Weekly charts ===
Chart (1984–1985)	Peak position
Austria (Ö3 Austria Top 40)	2
Australia (Kent Music Report)	8
Belgium (Ultratop 50 Flanders)	1
Canada Top Singles (RPM)	9
Europe (Europarade Top 40)	3
Europe (Eurochart Hot 100)	15
France (SNEP)	8
Ireland (IRMA)	4
Italy (Musica e dischi)	1
Italy (Discografia Internazionale)	2
Netherlands (Dutch Top 40)	1
Netherlands (Single Top 100)	1
New Zealand (Recorded Music NZ)	5
Switzerland (Schweizer Hitparade)	2
UK Singles (Official Charts)	3
US Billboard Hot 100	48
US Hot Dance Club Play (Billboard)	1
US Hot Dance Music/Maxi-Singles Sales (Billboard)	4
US Cash Box Top 100	32
West Germany (GfK)	3

Chart (1991)	Peak position
Europe (Eurochart Hot 100)	83
Germany (GfK)	28
Ireland (IRMA)	16
Netherlands (Single Top 100)	72
Spain Airplay	19
UK Singles (Official Charts)	32
UK Airplay (Music Week)	25

'94 Remix (with John Foster's vocal)
Chart (1994)	Peak position
Italy (Musica e dischi)	22

Chart (2013)	Peak position
UK Singles (Official Charts)	95
Ireland (IRMA)	62

"Smalltown Boy (Reprise)"
Chart (2014)	Peak position
Ireland (IRMA)	51

Chart (2024)	Peak position
UK Singles (Official Charts)	51

Chart (2026)	Peak position
Greece International (IFPI)	67

=== Year-end charts ===
Chart (1984)	Position
Australia (Kent Music Report)	59
Belgium (Ultratop 50 Flanders)	12
Europe (Europarade Top 40)	27
France	41
Netherlands (Dutch Top 40)	15
Netherlands (Single Top 100)	21
Switzerland (Schweizer Hitparade)	13
UK Singles (OCC)	43
West Germany (Media Control)	11

Chart (1985)	Position
Canada Top Singles (RPM)	86

=== Sales and certifications ===
Region	Certification	Certified units/sales
Canada (Music Canada)	Gold	50,000^{^}
France	—	300,000
Italy (FIMI)	Gold	25,000^{‡}
United Kingdom (BPI)	2× Platinum	1,200,000^{‡}
Streaming
Greece (IFPI Greece)	Platinum	2,000,000^{†}
^{^} Shipments figures based on certification alone.^{‡} Sales+streaming figures based on certification alone.^{†} Streaming-only figures based on certification alone.

== See also ==
- List of Dutch Top 40 number-one singles of 1984
- List of number-one dance singles of 1985 (U.S.)
