= Bronski Beat =

British synthpop band

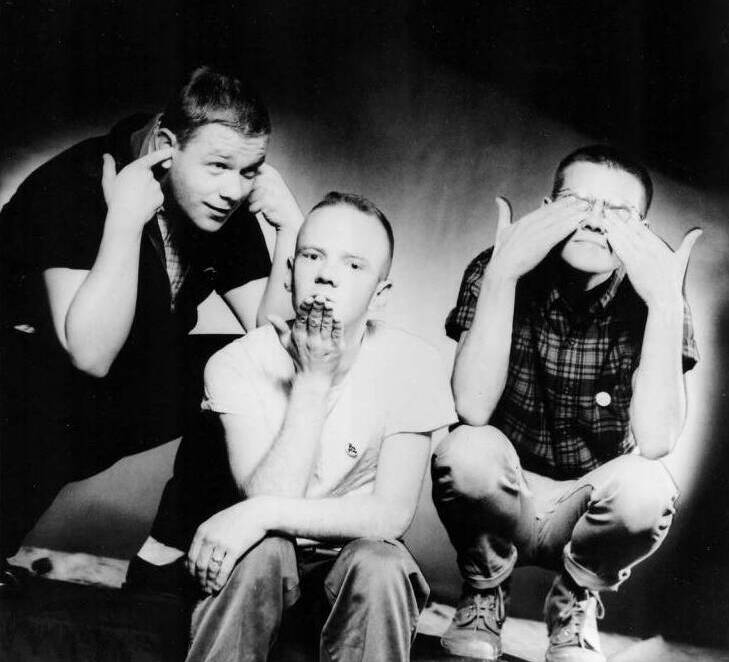
- Bronski Beat in 1985, from left to right: Steve Bronski, Jimmy Somerville, and Larry Steinbachek

Background information
- Origin: Brixton, London, England
- Genres: Synth-pop; dance-pop; hi-NRG; disco
- Years active: 1983–1995; 2016–2018
- Label: London
- Spinoffs: The Communards
- Past members: Steve Bronski; Jimmy Somerville; Larry Steinbachek; Stephen Granville; John Foster; Jonathan Hellyer; Richard Coles; Ian Donaldson

Bronski Beat were a synth-pop band formed in 1983 in London, England. The initial lineup, which recorded the majority of their hits, consisted of Scottish musicians Jimmy Somerville (vocals) and Steve Bronski (keyboards, percussion) and English musician Larry Steinbachek (keyboards, percussion). Simon Davolls contributed backing vocals to many songs. Throughout the band's career, Bronski was the only member to appear in every lineup.

Bronski Beat achieved success in the mid-1980s, particularly with the 1984 single "Smalltown Boy" from their debut album The Age of Consent. "Smalltown Boy" peaked atop the Dutch, Italian and Belgium charts, and peaked in the top 3 in Austria, Switzerland, West Germany and the UK. All members of the band were openly gay and their songs reflected this, often containing political commentary on gay issues. Somerville left Bronski Beat in 1985 and went on to have success as lead singer of the Communards and as a solo artist. He was replaced by vocalist John Foster, with whom the band continued to have hits in the UK and Europe through 1986. Foster left Bronski Beat after their second album, and the band were joined by Jonathan Hellyer before dissolving in 1995.

Steve Bronski revived the band in 2016, recording new material with 1990s member Ian Donaldson. Steinbachek died later that year, Bronski died in 2021, leaving Somerville as the last surviving member of the band's original lineup and one of six surviving members of the band.

== History ==
=== 1983–1985: Early years and The Age of Consent ===
Bronski Beat formed in 1983 when Jimmy Somerville, Steve Bronski (both from Glasgow) and Larry Steinbachek (from Southend, Essex) shared a three-bedroom flat at Lancaster House in Brixton, London. Steinbachek had heard Somerville singing during the making of Framed Youth: The Revenge of the Teenage Perverts and suggested they make some music. They first performed publicly at an arts festival, September in the Pink. The trio were unhappy with the inoffensive nature of contemporary gay performers and sought to be more outspoken and political.

Bronski Beat signed a recording contract with London Records in 1984 after doing only nine live gigs. The band's debut single, "Smalltown Boy", about a gay teenager leaving his family and fleeing his home town, was a hit, peaking at No 3 in the UK Singles Chart, and topping charts in Belgium and the Netherlands. The single was accompanied by a promotional video directed by Bernard Rose, showing Somerville trying to befriend an attractive diver at a swimming pool, then being attacked by the diver's homophobic associates, being returned to his family by the police and having to leave home. (The police officer was played by Colin Bell, then the marketing manager of London Records.) "Smalltown Boy" reached 48 in the U.S. chart and peaked at 8 in Australia.

The follow-up single, "Why?", adopted a hi-NRG sound and was more lyrically focused on anti-gay prejudice. It also achieved Top 10 status in the UK, reaching 6, and was another Top 10 hit for the band in Australia, Switzerland, Germany, France and the Netherlands.

At the end of 1984, the trio released an album titled The Age of Consent. The inner sleeve listed the varying ages of consent for consensual gay sex in different nations around the world. At the time, the age of consent for sexual acts between men in the UK was 21 compared with 16 for heterosexual acts, with several other countries having more liberal laws on gay sex. The album peaked at 4 in the UK Albums Chart, 36 in the U.S., and 12 in Australia.

Around the same time, the band headlined "Pits and Perverts", a concert at the Electric Ballroom in London to raise funds for the Lesbians and Gays Support the Miners campaign. This event is featured in the film Pride.

The third single, released before Christmas 1984, was a revival of "It Ain't Necessarily So", the George and Ira Gershwin classic (from Porgy and Bess). The song questions the accuracy of biblical tales. It also reached the UK Top 20.

In 1985, the trio joined up with Marc Almond to record a version of Donna Summer's "I Feel Love". The full version was actually a medley that also incorporated snippets of Summer's "Love to Love You Baby" and John Leyton's "Johnny Remember Me". It was a big success, reaching 3 in the UK and equalling the chart achievement of "Smalltown Boy". Although the original had been one of Marc Almond's all-time favourite songs, he had never read the lyrics and thus incorrectly sang "What’ll it be, what’ll it be, you and me" instead of "Falling free, falling free, falling free" on the finished record.

The band and their producer Mike Thorne had gone back into the studio in early 1985 to record a new single, "Run from Love", and PolyGram (London Records' parent company at that time) had pressed a number of promo singles and 12" versions of the song and sent them to radio and record stores in the UK. However, the single was shelved as tensions in the band, both personal and political, resulted in Somerville leaving Bronski Beat in the summer of that year.

"Run from Love" was subsequently released in remix form on the Bronski Beat album Hundreds & Thousands, a collection of mostly remixes (LP) and B-sides (as bonus tracks on the CD version) as well as the hit "I Feel Love". Somerville went on to form the Communards with Richard Coles while the remaining members of Bronski Beat searched for a new vocalist.

=== 1985–1995: Somerville's departure, John Foster and Jonathan Hellyer eras ===
Bronski Beat recruited John Foster as Somerville's replacement (Foster is credited as "Jon Jon"). A single, "Hit That Perfect Beat", was released in November 1985, reaching 3 in the UK. It repeated this success on the Australian chart and was also featured in the film Letter to Brezhnev. A second single, "C'mon C'mon", also charted in the UK Top 20 and an album, Truthdare Doubledare, released in May 1986, peaked at 18. The film Parting Glances (1986) included Bronski Beat songs "Love and Money", "Smalltown Boy" and "Why?" During this period, the band teamed up with producer Mark Cunningham on the first-ever BBC Children In Need single, a cover of David Bowie's "Heroes", released in 1986 under the name of The County Line.

Foster left the band in 1987. Following Foster's departure, Bronski Beat began work on their next album, Out and About. The tracks were recorded at Berry Street studios in London with engineer Brian Pugsley. Some of the song titles were "The Final Spin" and "Peace and Love". The latter track featured Strawberry Switchblade vocalist Rose McDowall and appeared on several internet sites in 2006. One of the other songs from the project called "European Boy" was recorded in 1987 by disco group Splash. The lead singer of Splash was former Tight Fit singer Steve Grant. Steinbachek and Bronski toured extensively with the new material with positive reviews, however the project was abandoned as the group was dropped by London Records. Also in 1987, Bronski Beat and Somerville performed at a reunion concert for "International AIDS Day", supported by New Order, at the Brixton Academy, London.

In 1989, Jonathan Hellyer became lead singer, and the band extensively toured the U.S. and Europe with back-up vocalist Annie Conway. They achieved one minor hit with the song "Cha Cha Heels", a one-off collaboration sung by American actress and singer Eartha Kitt, which peaked at 32 in the UK. The song was originally written for movie and recording star Divine, who was unable to record the song before his death in 1988. 1990–91 saw Bronski Beat release three further singles on the Zomba record label, "I'm Gonna Run Away", "One More Chance" and "What More Can I Say". The singles were produced by Mike Thorne.

Foster and Bronski Beat teamed up again in 1994, and released a techno "Tell Me Why '94" and an acoustic "Smalltown Boy '94" on the German record label, ZYX Music. The album Rainbow Nation was released the following year with Hellyer returning as lead vocalist, as Foster had dropped out of the project and Ian Donaldson was brought on board to do keyboards and programming. After a few years of touring, Bronski Beat then dissolved, with Steve Bronski going on to become a producer for other artists and Ian Donaldson becoming a successful DJ (Sordid Soundz). Larry Steinbachek became the musical director for Michael Laub's theatre company, 'Remote Control Productions'.

=== 2007–2016: Bronski solo activities and resurrection of Bronski Beat ===
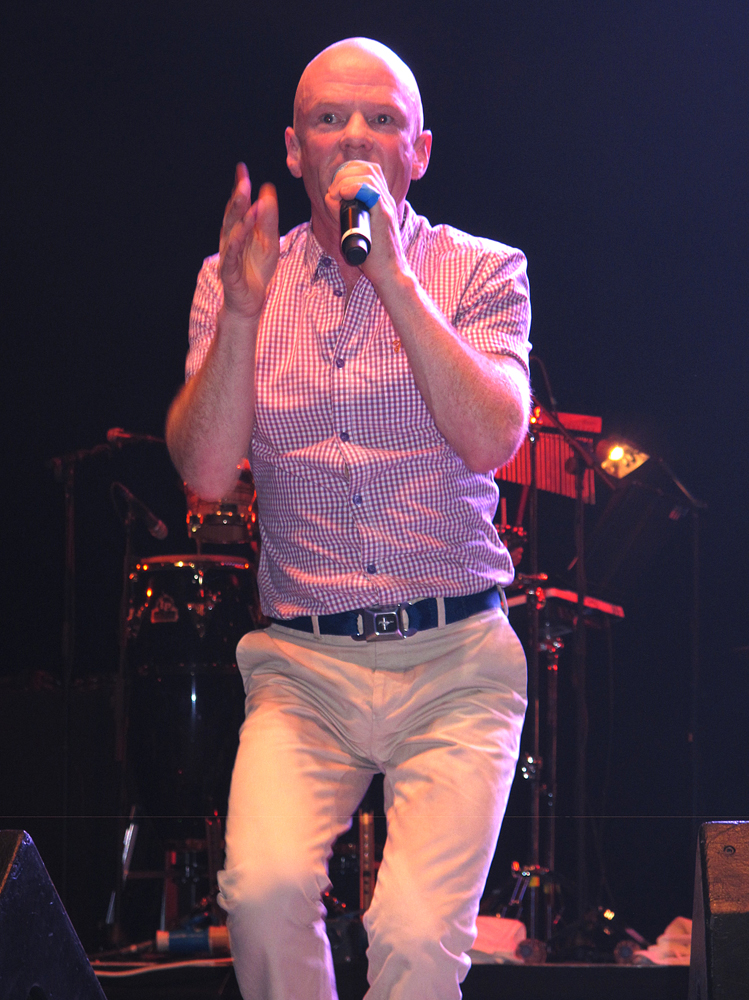
Somerville performing in 2011, on the Here and Now Tour.

In 2007, Steve Bronski remixed the song "Stranger to None" by the UK alternative rock band, All Living Fear. Four different mixes were made, with one appearing on their retrospective album, Fifteen Years After. Bronski also remixed the track "Flowers in the Morning" by Northern Irish electronic band Electrobronze in 2007, changing the style of the song from classical to Hi-NRG disco.

In 2015, Steve Bronski teamed up as a one-off with Jessica James (aka Barbara Bush) and said that she reminded him of Divine, because of her look and Eartha Kitt-like sound. The one-off project was to cover the track he made in 1989.

In 2016, Steve Bronski again teamed up with Ian Donaldson, with the aim of bringing Bronski Beat back, enlisting a new singer, Stephen Granville. In 2017, the new Bronski Beat released a reworked version of "Age of Consent" entitled "Age of Reason". Out & About, the unreleased Bronski Beat album from 1987, was released digitally via Steve Bronski's website. The album features the original tracks plus remixes by Bronski.

=== 2017–present: Deaths of Steinbachek and Bronski ===
On 12 January 2017, it was revealed that Steinbachek had died the previous month after a short battle with cancer, with his family and friends at his bedside. He was 56. Bronski died on 7 December 2021, at the age of 61, in a Central London flat fire.

== Members ==
=== Founding members ===
- Steve Bronski – keyboards, synthesizers, programming, percussion, acoustic guitar, vocals (1983–1995, 2016–2018; died 2021)
- Jimmy Somerville – vocals, tambourine (1983–1985, 1987)
- Larry Steinbachek – keyboards, synthesizers, percussion (1983–1995; died 2016)

=== Other members ===
- Richard Coles – saxophone, clarinet (1983–1984, 1985)
- John Foster – vocals (1985–1987, 1994–1995)
- Jonathan Hellyer – vocals (1989–1994, 1995)
- Ian Donaldson – keyboards, synthesizers, programming (1994–1995, 2016–2018)
- Stephen Granville – vocals (2016–2018)

== Awards and nominations ==
Year	Awards	Work	Category	Result	Ref.
1984	NME Awards	Themselves	Best New Act	Won	
1984	Smash Hits Poll Winners Party	Themselves	Best New Act	Nominated	
1984	Smash Hits Poll Winners Party	Themselves	Best Group	Nominated	
1984	Smash Hits Poll Winners Party	The Age of Consent	Best LP	Nominated	
1984	Smash Hits Poll Winners Party	"Why?"	Best Single	Nominated	
1984	Smash Hits Poll Winners Party	"Smalltown Boy"	Best Single	Nominated	
1985	Brit Awards	"Smalltown Boy"	Best British Single	Nominated	
1985	Brit Awards	Themselves	Best British Group	Nominated	
1985	Billboard Music Awards	"Smalltown Boy"	Top Dance Play Single	Nominated	
1986	Billboard Music Awards	Themselves	Top Dance Club Play Artist	Nominated	
1986	Ivor Novello Awards	"Hit That Perfect Beat"	The Best Film Theme or Song	Nominated	
2017	Gay Music Chart Awards	"Smalltown Boy" (Arnaud Rebotini Remix)	Best Original Soundtrack	Nominated	
2025	Clubbing TV Awards	"Smalltown Boy"	Best Staff Pick Video	Nominated	

== Discography ==
Studio albums

- The Age of Consent (1984)
- Truthdare Doubledare (1986)
- Out & About (1987)
- Rainbow Nation (1995)
- The Age of Reason (2017)

== See also ==
- Jimmy Somerville discography
