= Steve Bronski =

Scottish singer-songwriter (1960–2021)

- Bronski in 1985

Background information
- Born: Steven William Forrest; 7 February 1960; Glasgow, Scotland
- Origin: Castlemilk, Glasgow, Scotland
- Died: 7 December 2021 (aged 61) Soho, London, England
- Occupations: Singer; songwriter
- Instruments: Keyboards; synthesizers; piano; percussion; guitar; accordion; vocals
- Formerly of: Bronski Beat

Steven William Forrest (7 February 1960 – 7 December 2021), better known by his stage name Steve Bronski, was a Scottish singer-songwriter, best known for his work as a member of synth-pop band Bronski Beat, with Jimmy Somerville and Larry Steinbachek.

== Career ==
He was a co-founder and keyboard player of the group Bronski Beat, known for the singles "Smalltown Boy" and "Why?". He was also an LGBTQ activist and was openly gay from an early age.

Bronski, whose real name was Steven Forrest, was born and raised in Castlemilk, Glasgow, where he worked in his youth as a labourer. He lived in a flat in Brixton, London, during the early formative period of Bronski Beat with his fellow musicians. Later on he squatted with partner and bandmate Larry Steinbachek in Camberwell, London. Following the break up of the band he lived in Thailand for many years, as well as Paris, before returning to the United Kingdom.

== Personal life and death ==
Bronski had a stroke in 2018 which limited his mobility. He died at the age of 61, from smoke inhalation in a fire at his home in Soho, London, on 7 December 2021, 5 years to the day after Steinbachek.
