= Birthday (The Peddlers album) =

Studio album by the Peddlers
- Released: 1969
- Recorded: IBC Studios
- Genres: Jazz rock, Jazz fusion, Soul jazz
- Length: 38:55
- Label: CBS Records
- Producer: Cyril Smith

The Peddlers chronology
Three in a Cell (1968)	Birthday (1969)	Three for All (1970)

Birthday is the third studio LP album by the Peddlers, originally released in 1969. It was their final recording for the label before the group returned to Philips.

== Track listing ==
Side one
No.	Title	Writer(s)	Length
1.	"Where Have All the Flowers Gone?"	Pete Seeger	4:10
2.	"Little Red Rooster"	Willie Dixon	3:15
3.	"Southern Woman"	Roy Phillips	2:20
4.	"By the Time I Get to Phoenix"	Jimmy Webb	3:10
5.	"Girlie P.S. I Love You Girlie"	Roy Phillips	6:30

Side two
No.	Title	Writer(s)	Length
1.	"Day In Day Out"	Johnny Mercer; Rube Bloom	2:20
2.	"City Living"	Anthony Richard	2:20
3.	"Lockshen Pudding"	Roy Phillips; Tab Martin; Trevor Morais	10:45
4.	"Birth"	Roy Phillips	4:05

== Personnel ==
- Roy Phillips – acoustic guitar, organ, piano, vocals
- Trevor Morais – percussion
- Tab Martin – electric bass
- Mike Claydon – engineer
- Cyril Smith – producer
- Ted Sharp – engineer
- Andy Johns – engineer
- Terence Donovan – cover artwork
- Chris Hopper – inner artwork
- John Hays – design
