= Andrea Britton =

British Singer

- Born: UK
- Genres: Singer
- Labels: Switch, 3 Beat Music Ltd., Club Culture, Hit! Records, Nebula

Andrea Britton is a British singer-songwriter and author. During the 2000s she had success with songs that include, "Am I on Your Mind?", "Winter" and "Counting Down the Days".

== Background ==
Britton has been releasing music since 2002. Britton's single "Am I on Your Mind?", recorded with Oxygen, made it to No. 30 on the UK Singles Chart in late 2002. In 2005, she had another hit single, "Winter", with DT8 Project, which made No. 35. Her other notable songs include the singles "Time Still Drifts Away" and "Inner Sense" with The Disco Brothers, "Wait for You" with Lost Witness, "Take My Hand" with Jurgen Vries (which peaked at #23) and "Counting Down The Days" with Sunfreakz in 2007 (peaked at No. 37 on the UK chart). She has appeared on numerous compilation albums worldwide.

She also shared the stage with Dave Randall on his project Slovo. They toured with Lamb, Moloko and Damien Rice. Britton supported Kylie Minogue on her Fever Tour, and continues to appear live around the world, more recently supporting Kelly Rowland. Britton also writes for other artists.

In addition to being a singer, songwriter and author, she is also an Entrepreneur and Coach.

== Career ==
=== 2000s–2010s ===
Britton recorded the song, "Am I On Your Mind" which was credited to Oxygen ft. Andrea Britton. It debuted at its highest position of no. 30 on 11 Jan 2003. It spent another two weeks in the chart. It also made its debut at no. 90 on the Eurochart Hot 100 Singles chart for the week of 18 January 2003.

It was reported by News Shopper on 20 April 2004 that Britton was to release her new single, " Take My Hand". The single having been played on Radio One for the previous eight weeks was now reportedly making an impression on the station's playlist.

She, Glenn Tilbrook, Clem Curtis and Linda Lewis fronted the Lord Large Experiment with the keyboard player and composer Stephen Large. Their debut album, The Lord's First XI, was released on Acid Jazz. Britton's song was "Way to Go".

Britton recorded the song "Counting the Days" which was credited to Sunfreakz feat. Andrea Britton. It debuted at no. 22 in the Radio One chart for the week of 21 July 2007. Also that week, the song had moved up from no. 42 to no. 30 on the Music Week TV Airplay chart, and debuted at no 22 publication's Top 30 Physical Singles chart.

=== 2020s ===
In December 2022, Britton and "Keith Anthony" pooled their talents to record the song, "Sing Out Yourself", a Christmas song.
