= Honey Come Back (song) =

1970 Glen Campbell single

Single by Glen Campbell

from the album Try a Little Kindness
- B-side: "Where Do You Go"
- Released: January 1970
- Genre: Country
- Length: 3:00
- Label: Capitol
- Songwriter(s): Jimmy Webb
- Producer(s): Al DeLory

Glen Campbell singles chronology
"Try a Little Kindness" (1969)	"Honey Come Back" (1970)	"All I Have to Do Is Dream" (1970)

"Honey Come Back" is a song written by Jimmy Webb, and recorded by the American country music artist Glen Campbell. It would become a major hit for him.

== Glen Campbell version ==
It was released in January 1970 as the second single from his album Try a Little Kindness. The song peaked at number 2 on the Billboard Hot Country Singles chart. It also reached number 1 on the RPM Country Tracks chart in Canada.

A video was produced for the song, featuring Campbell sitting by a fireplace composing a letter – presumably of his thoughts and feelings for his girlfriend, who has left him. The video has aired on Great American Country.

=== Chart performance ===
Weekly charts

Chart (1970)	Peak position
Australian Go-Set	6
Australia (Kent Music Report)	7
Canadian RPM Country Tracks	1
Canadian RPM Top Singles	6
Canadian RPM Adult Contemporary	3
Euro Hit 50	13
Irish Singles Chart	2
South African Singles Chart	16
UK Singles Chart	4
US Hot Country Songs (Billboard)	2
US Billboard Hot 100	19
US Billboard Easy Listening	4
US Cash Box Top 100	11

Year-end charts

Chart (1970)	Rank
UK Singles Chart	15
Australia (KMR)	64
U.S. Cashbox Top 100	83

== The Peddlers version ==
"Honey Come Back"

Song by The Peddlers
- B-side: "Where Have All the Flowers Gone?"
- Released: July 1970
- Label: CBS BA 461288

The Peddlers singles chronology
"Girlie" (1970)	"Honey Come Back" (1970)	"Day in Day Out" (1970)

In 1970 The Peddlers version became a hit in New Zealand.

=== Background ===
Following on from their success in New Zealand with Backed with "Girlie", The Peddlers released their take on "Honey Come Back". Backed with "Where Have All the Flowers Gone?", it was released on a single, CBS BA 461288 in New Zealand in 1970. The song appears on the New Zealand issued compilation, The Very Best of the Peddlers, released on CBS SBP 473951.

=== Chart ===
The song spent four weeks in the New Zealand chart in July, peaking at no. 8 on week two.

Chart (1970)	Peak position
New Zealand (Listener)	8

=== Later years ===
The song was not included on the How Cool Is Cool ... The Complete CBS Recordings CD compilation. However the compilation did include two previously unreleased songs, "Say No More" and "Some of This Some of That".

== Versions by other artists ==
The song was first recorded in 1965 by singer Dorsey Burnette during his stint at Motown's country subsidiary Mel-o-dy. It was not issued at the time and only resurfaced in 2006, when it appeared on the compilation The Complete Motown Recordings 1964–1965. The first released version was by the Motown singer Chuck Jackson, whose single reached number 43 on the R&B charts in 1969. In December 1969, Don Ho also released it as a single.
