= Tell the World We're Not In =

Song by The Peddlers
- A-side: "Tell the World We're Not In"
- B-side: "Rainy Day in London"
- Released: 1970
- Label: Philips 6006 034
- Composer: Black/King

Tell the World We're Not In was a single for The Peddlers. It was released in 1970 and was the theme song to the film Goodbye Gemini.

== Background ==
The song was used in the film Goodbye Gemini, which was released in 1970. The film, which was a horror film, starred Martin Potter and Judy Geeson. Michael Redgrave also appeared in the film.

== Release ==
It was released in United Kingdom on Philips 6006 034. In New Zealand, it was released on Columbia DNZ 10699.

There are two mixes of the song. The movie and original single version has horns. The other version (album version) has no horns.

== Chart ==
The song was a hit in New Zealand. It got on to the Listener chart on the week of September 14, 1970. Spending three weeks in the chart, it peaked at no. 18 on the week of September 21.
