= Tab Martin =

British bassist

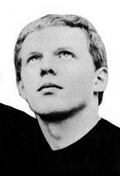
- Martin in 1968

Background information
- Born: Alan Raymond Brearley; 24 December 1944 (age 81); Newcastle upon Tyne, England
- Genres: Jazz, pop
- Occupation: Bassist
- Years active: 1963–1979

Tab Martin (born Alan Raymond Brearley; 24 December 1944) is an English bass guitarist. He has been a member of well-known English bands from the 1960s. He was a member of the Tornados and played on their hit "Globetrotter". He was also a member of the Peddlers and played on their hits "Birth" and "Girlie". He also founded 1960s group the Saints.

Martin was known for his technique of playing his bass in an upright fashion. In 1967, Martin was no. 9 in the Bass Guitarist section of the Beat Instrumental Gold Star Awards.

== Early life ==
Martin was born Alan Raymond Brearley in Newcastle on 24 December 1944. He spent his early years in Brighouse, West Yorkshire.

== Career ==
In 1963 Martin was told by his father that he had answered an ad for Joe Meek who was looking for bassists for his group The Tornados; Martin was unaware his father had booked him an audition and his father was unaware that Martin played guitar, not bass.

Martin became a member of the Tornados when he replaced Chris Hodges. He left the group a month after they released the single "Globetrotter" and was replaced by former Pirates member Brian Gregg. He went on to form his own band, the Saints who acted as the first backing band for singer Heinz who had also previously been in the Tornados.

In April 1964, along with Roy Phillips and Trevor Morais, Martin formed the Peddlers. The Peddlers had a minor hit with "Let the Sunshine", followed by a top twenty hit with "Birth" and followed by another hit, "Girlie". The group's album Birthday which was released on Epic also charted. Martin continued with the Peddlers, with New Zealand drummer Paul Johnston replacing Morais in 1972. He stayed with the group until their breakup in the mid-1970s. After that, he became a session musician.

Martin produced a single for the Otis Waygood Band. The single "Get It Started" b/w "Red Hot Passion" was released on Decca in 1977. He also produced "Making Up Again" which was a hit single for UK group Goldie. In 1978, he and Dominic De Sousa were working for MAM Records. They worked together, producing the "Disco Hell" single for Dafne and the Tenderspots which was released the following year.

== Personal life ==
In an interview with Radio New Zealand in May 2020, Roy Phillips said Martin was living in Lisbon, Portugal and battling Alzheimer's disease.
