= The Lord's First XI =

Studio album by Lord Large
- Released: 2006
- Studio: Various
- Genre: various
- Label: Acid Jazz AJXCD182 (UK CD release); Acid Jazz AJXLP182 (UK LP release); Octave OTCD-2136 (Japanese 2007 CD release)
- Producer: Andy Jones

The Lord's First XI aka The Lord's First Eleven is a 2006 album by Lord Large. It features collaborations with artists such as Clem Curtis, Roy Phillips, and Linda Lewis. The material includes northern-soul type songs and funk.

== Background ==
The Lord's First XI is an album by Lord Large in collaboration with other artists. It features vocals by Andrea Britton, Ashley Slater, Clem Curtis, Dean Parrish, Glenn Tilbrook, Linda Lewis, Louise Marshall, Robert Bradley, and Roy Phillips. After its release, Lord Large's popularity in London grew.

The album came about after Clem Curtis collaborated with Lord Large, recording the single, "Stuck in a Wind Up" bw "Move Over Daddy", which was credited to Lord Large featuring Clem Curtis. It was originally released on 2 Bit 2BIT45-1, a label that was created for the release. Having some airplay on Radio 2, it was then released on the Acid Jazz label (cat no. AJX174S) in 2005. The label offered to release an album with Clem Curtis and other artists.

As legend or fact may have it, Roy Phillips, leader of The Peddlers became involved with the project resulting from producer / drummer Andy Jones taking his honeymoon in New Zealand and finding a new drinking buddy in Roy Phillips. Roy Phillips recorded his vocals for the song "Closer" at Midnight Studios in Christchurch, New Zealand.

Drummer Andy Jones handled the album's production.

== Reception ==
The record made freelance journalist Pierre Perrone's Top 10 in Music Week for the week of 2 September 2006. He also said "Lord Large engineers another northern soul revival".

The album was reviewed by Mojo. The reviewer called "Stuck in a Wind Up" "the perfect northern soul floor filler.

The Metro review by Arwa Haider was published on 12 February 2007. Besides mentioning the opening track, "Sun in the Sands", the northern soul classic, "What Did I Do?". " Don't Stick Around Too Long" and the hidden jam if the CD is left playing, Haider called it "wickedly winning stuff" and "a great innings for contemporary British soul".

A short review of the album by the Daily Express, published 13 March 2007 mentioned the two men from a northern soul band who get it just about spot on, and Dean Parrish's song "Left, Right & Centre" which was written by a fifteen-year old Paul Weller. It finished off with, "it is almost as if the Wigan Casino never closed".

A review by Jason Draper of Record Collector was published in early September 2007. After praising "Stuck in a Wind Up" and calling it a slice of breezy, upbeat soul that was so authentic one would swear it was recorded in the late 60s, and saying that most of the album sounded like the work of some Midwest US nutter who kept his stuff hidden for over 30 years, he said that it ran the gamut of string-laden soul, barnstorming dancefloor fillers and Stevie Wonder-like synthy grooves.

The review by The Huddersfield Daily Examiner was positive with the reviewer saying that the album was a faithful reproduction of quirky organ-laced funk, Motown stomp and northern soul. He singled out the Paul Weller composition of "Left, Right & Centre as the album's best moment.

Andy Parker of Dimebag Darrell Magazine said that the album re-created the sound that has people hoofing all night in Wigan and additionally recruited stars of the genre to help out. He said that it was excellent stuff and with the contributions of ex-Foundations man Clem Curtis, Linda Lewis and northern soul legend, Dean Parrish made it a must-hear album for vintage soul fans.

== Track listing ==
The Lord's First XI (vinyl LP) Acid Jazz AJXLP182
No.	Track	Credit	Time	Notes
A1	"Sun in the Sands"			
A2	"Stuck in a Wind Up"	Clem Curtis		
A3	"Closer"	Roy Phillips		
A4	"What Did I Do?"	Clem Curtis		
A5	"Work It Out"	Linda Lewis		
A6	"Julianna"	Clem Curtis		
B1	"Heath Robinson"			
B2	"The Auctioneer"	Ashley Slater		
B3	"Way to Go"	Andrea Britton		
B4	"Fading Light"	Robert Brandley		
B5	"Left, Right & Centre"	Dean Parrish		
B6	"Don't Stick Around Too Long"	Glen Tilbrook		

The Lord's First XI, Octave OTCD-2136 (Japanese CD release with bonus tracks)
No.	Track	Desc	Credit	Time	Notes
01	"Sun in the Sands"	Instrumental		4:09	
02	"Stuck in a Wind Up"	vocal.	Clem Curtis	3:15	
03	"Closer"	vocal.	Roy Phillips	4:18	
04	"What Did I Do?"	vocal.	Clem Curtis	3:17	
05	"Work It Out"	vocal.	Linda Lewis	4:10	
06	"Juliana"	vocal.	Clem Curtis	3:53	
07	"Heath Robinson"	Instrumental		3:30	
08	"The Auctioneer"	vocal.	Ashley Slater	3:22	
09	"Way to Go"	vocal.	Andrea Britton	3:37	
10	"Fading Light"	vocal.	Robert Brandley	4:17	
11	"Left, Right & Centre"	vocal.	Dean Parrish	3:09	
12	"Don't Stick Around Too Long"	vocal.	Glen Tilbrook	14:02	
13	"Move Over Daddy"	vocal.	Clem Curtis	2:59	bonus track
14	"The Hawley Arms Race"	Instrumental		4:16	bonus track
15	"The 4th Earl of Nunhead"	Instrumental		3:55	bonus track
