= Faron's Flamingos =

English band

- Origin: Liverpool, England
- Years active: 1960s–1970s
- Labels: Oriole, Raw, Mastersound
- Past members: Faron Ruffley; Ronald "Ronnie" Plimmer; Paddy Chambers; Dave Cooper; Nicky Crouch; Trevor Morais

Faron's Flamingos were an English Merseybeat band. Despite their lack of commercial success, they remain an important part of Merseybeat history and have the distinction of being the first major example of the "Mersey Motown" sound with their release of "Do You Love Me".

== Background ==
Fronted by William "Faron" Ruffley (born 8 January 1942 in Liverpool), the group was considered one of the best live groups on the Merseybeat scene. Bob Wooler, the DJ from The Cavern nicknamed him Faron, 'the panda-footed prince of prance'. Their blistering version of "Do You Love Me was the first major example of the Mersey Motown sound.

== Career ==
=== The Hi-Hats and The Ravens ===
The group's history can be traced back to the Hi-Hats which came together at the Liverpool Mercury Cycling Club. The group then changed its name to Robin and The Ravens with the lead singer Robin dressed in a yellow silk suit and the band in pink jackets. In January 1961, Ruffley left the band to join Gerry and the Pacemakers on an eight-week tour in Hamburg, Germany, appearing with them at the Top Ten Club.

=== The Flamingos ===
When Ruffley came back from touring with the Pacemakers, he formed Faron's Flamingos. They made their first appearance at The Cavern in 1962 with the Beatles singing backup. Also that year and with a growing following, they were offered a chance to go to France and play at the US army bases. Band member Eric London did not want to give up his job, so he did not travel. He was replaced by Dave Cooper. Bands touring France had to bring a female singer with them and they took a lady called Pam Connolly on tour with them. In spite of doing well, there were some issues with Billy Jones leaving the band. When the group returned to the UK, the line up was Nicky Crouch on lead guitar, Paddy Chambers on rhythm guitar, Faron Ruffley on bass and vocals and Trevor Morais on drums.

In May 1963, the group accepted an invitation to record some material for the album This Is Merseybeat. Also in 1963, their version of "Do You Love Me" was released on the Oriole label. Their lack of success with this song may have had something to do with publishing company Leeds Music pushing the other side of the single which was "See If She Cares". Writer Bill Harry and his wife Virginia were there at the Oriole Studio when the group recorded the song. It differed from the version that was recorded by the Contours. He said that John Schroeder asked them to go out to the street to ask some young folk to come in and dance to the recording. Some crates of beer were also brought in. People in the studio control room were surprised and everyone thought it had had chart hit written all over it and Schroeder said that it had the potential to top the chart.

In 1965, Faron reformed the band and performed in France until the late 1960s. He also had a version of the group running in the 1970s. Later versions of his Flamingos have included Brian Jones, Arty Davis, Phil Melia, Ken Shalliker, Billy Burton, Arthur Hayes, Nicky Crouch, Bernie Rogers and others.

== Faron Ruffley ==
Faron Ruffley
- Born: William Ruffley; 8 January 1942 (age 84); Liverpool, England
- Genre: Merseybeat
- Instrument: Vocals

William "Faron" Ruffley (born 8 January 1942) is an English singer, known for being the lead vocalist for Faron's Flamingos.

Ruffley was born and raised in Liverpool, and formed Faron's Flamingos in 1961 after touring with Gerry and the Pacemakers. They were one of the first examples of the Merseybeat sound with their cover of "Do You Love Me". Faron had many versions of the band, including a version that was active in France.

Ruffley married a woman from Corsica. He lived in France for some time but moved back to Liverpool when his mother fell ill. He formed a small band with Brian Jones (of The Undertakers) and toured around Liverpool. He reformed the Flamingos in 1985. Ruffley is a born-again Christian. When he was 50 years old, he suffered a heart attack and spent some time in hospital. By the time he was 60 years old, he had suffered five heart attacks and had to have a quadruple heart bypass. A stroke left him unable to speak for six weeks and he also had both hips replaced, with metal replacements for some bones in his leg and toes. He recalled, "I've been dead three times and they've brought me back. Now I'm a born-again Christian and I firmly believe there is a God, I've been up there and seen the light".

Ruffley was advised by doctors to retire from touring in the 2000s, but is semi-active as of 2024. In the 2000s, he was working on an autobiography.

== Members ==
- Ronald "Ronnie" Plimmer - tenor saxophone
- Paddy Chambers - guitar / worked with Paddy Klaus and Gibson, The Big Three, Sinbad
- Dave "Mushy" Cooper - bass / worked with The Undertakers
- Pam Connolly - vocals
- Nicky Crouch - guitar, vocals / worked with The Mojos, The Undertakers
- Billy Jones - guitar
- Eric London - bass / worked with Group One, Mojos
- Trevor Morais - drums / worked with The Peddlers, Rory Storm & the Hurricanes, Quantum Jump
- Bill "Faron" Ruffley - vocals and bass guitar / worked with The Big Three, Gerry and the Pacemakers
- Peter Campbell- bass guitar / worked with Fontanas
- Vic Grace - lead guitar and vocals / worked with The Secrets, Hi Cats
- David Harris - drums
- Pete Jones - lead guitar / worked with The Renegades, Red Fire (alias Pete Smith and Pete Jones)
- Arty Davies - drums / worked with Pressure Points, Lee Curtis and the All Stars, The Tempos, Korner Kafe, Knight Crew, Kingsize Taylor band, Chris Curtis
- Keith Karlson - bass guitar / worked with The Mojos
- Johnny Jay Rathbone - drums / worked with Mastermind's Almost Blues, Karl Terry cruisers
- John Mitch - drums / worked with The Stopouts, Ice Cream Robots
- Arthur Rigby - bass guitar
- Chris Evans - lead guitar / worked with The Undertakers, Earl Preston TTs
- Max Peckham - drums
- Brian Jones - tenor saxophone / worked with The Undertakers, Gary Glitter band, Ykickamoocow
- Mogsy Cook - backing vocals
- Peter Cook - lead guitar / worked with Earl Royce and the Olympics, Kansas City 5
- Derek Smallridge - drums / worked with The Four dees
- Owen Ricketts - bass guitar / worked with Jeannie and the Big Guys
- Dennis Collins - lead guitar
- Steve Robinson - tenor sax
- Phil Melia - lead guitar / worked with Mojo Filter, Pete Best band
- Ross Sullivan - keyboards (his father was Peter O'Sullivan, horse racing commentator)
- Steve Roberts - lead guitar / worked with Cliff Roberts Rockers
- Dennis Swale - bass guitar / worked with The Dimensions, Eddie Cave & The Fyx, Karl Terry & The Cruisers.
- Colin Drummond - keyboards
- Ronnie Plummer - tenor saxophone
- Bernie Rogers - drums / worked with Denny Seyton and the Sabres
- Arnie Neale - rhythm guitar / worked with Tempos, Hy-Tones
- Dave(Mac)McDowell - lead guitar
- Mike Rudd - bass guitar / worked with The Avengers, Johnny Kidd and the Pirates, Karl terry Cruisers
- Billy Burton - tenor saxophone / worked with Pete Best Combo
- Arthur Hayes - bass guitar
- Nic Johnston - harmonica
- George Fletcher - lead guitar
- Bill Good - bass guitar / worked with The Buzz band, Undertakers
- Richie Ballard - bass guitar / worked with Wheels on Fire, Cliff Roberts Rockers
- Tommy Hughes - keyboards / worked with Kansas City 5, The Swinging Blue Jeans, The Mojos
- Will Lloyd - harmonica
- Rachel Frost - vocals
- Ritchie Perkins - lead guitar / worked with The Tempos
- Frank Hopley - keyboards / worked with The Mastersounds
- Denis Malkin - rhythm guitar
- David Blackstone - lead guitar / worked with The Tabs, Gerry Deville City king's Big Three
- Alan Hanson - lead guitar / worked with The Brumbeats, Shane Fenton and the Fentones
- Gary McInnes - keyboards / worked with The New Applejacks
- David Morgan - lead guitar / worked with The Fourmost, Dominoes
- Phil Berube - keyboards and bass guitar / worked with The Beach Boys, Monkees, Joe Cocker
- Bobby Cortes - lead guitar, New York session musician, also ex pro wrestler under the name Bobby Bold Eagle
- Albie Donnelly - tenor saxophone / worked with Clayton Squares, Fix, Supercharge
- Al Peters - harmonica / worked with Almost Blues
- Barry "Basher" Robinson - rhythm and bass guitar, drums / worked with Billy Heartbeats, Excerts, Gerry Deville City kings, The Kop, Georgies Germs
- Mick Moon - keyboards
- Phil Hopkins - tenor saxophone / worked with The Dominoes
- Mike Jones - lead guitar and vocals

== Discography (selective) ==
Singles
Title	Catalogue	Year	Notes
"See If She Cares" / "Do You Love Me"	Oriole CB 1834	1963	
"Shake Sherry" / "Give Me Time"	Oriole CB 1867	1963	
"Let's Stomp" / "I Can Tell"	Columbia Records 4-43018	1964	B side is by Rory Storm and the Hurricanes; USA release
"Bring It On Home to Me" / "C'mon Everybody"	Raw RAW 27	1978	As Faron's Flamingoes

Album
Title	Catalogue	Year	Notes
Faron's Flamingos 1963, See If She Cares	Mastersound MS CD.585	1963	Compilation

Appears on
Act	Album title	Catalogue	Year	Song	Notes
Various artists	Take Six from "This Is Merseybeat	Oriole EP-7080	1963	"Let's Stomp"	EP
Various artists	This is Merseybeat Volume 1	Oriole PS 40047	1963	"Let's Stomp", "Talkin' 'bout You"	
Various artists	This is Merseybeat Volume 2	Oriole PS 40048	1963	"Sherry Sherry" / "So Fine"	
Various artists	The Exciting New Liverpool Sound (The Authentic Mersey Beat)	Columbia CL 2172	1964	"Let's Stomp", "Talkin' 'bout You"	

== Documentary and film ==
List
Title	Director, Producer, etc	Year	Credit	Notes
Beat City	Charles Squires (dir)	1963	On-screen participant	
Chasing Rainbows - A Nation and Its Music	Jeremy Marre (prod)	1986	Themselves	as Faron and his Flamingoes
Merseybeat Magic	Wally Scott (host)	1989	Themselves	
