= It's Only Make Believe =

Song by Jack Nance and Conway Twitty

Single by Conway Twitty

from the album Conway Twitty Sings
- A-side: "I'll Try"
- Released: July 14, 1958
- Recorded: May 7, 1958
- Studio: Bradley Studios (Nashville, Tennessee)
- Genre: Rock and roll; rockabilly
- Length: 2:10
- Label: MGM
- Songwriters: Jack Nance, Conway Twitty
- Producer: Jim Vienneau

Conway Twitty singles chronology
"I Need Your Lovin'" (1957)	"It's Only Make Believe" (1958)	"The Story of My Love" (1958)

Audio sample
- file; help

"It's Only Make Believe" is a song written by drummer Jack Nance and Mississippi-born singer Conway Twitty, while they were touring across Ontario, Canada, in 1958. Twitty was a relatively unknown rock n' roll singer at the time, and this song was his first hit, reaching No. 1 on the Billboard chart in November 1958 for two weeks.

The song has been covered by a number of artists, including Billy Fury, Child, and Ronnie McDowell, whose recording features contributions from Twitty. Glen Campbell had a Top 10 hit with the song in 1970.

== Background ==
The song was written mainly by Jack Nance, a member of Twitty's band, during an intermission in a show they were playing at the Flamingo Lounge in Hamilton, Ontario, in Canada, with Conway Twitty providing the finishing touches to the song. They recorded a demo of the song, and sent it together with "I'll Try" to Twitty's manager, Don Seat. MGM Records became interested in the songs and arranged for these and other songs to be recorded at the Bradley Studios in Nashville on May 7, 1958. The song was recorded by Twitty with the Jordanaires on backing vocals. Musicians who played on the song included Floyd Cramer on piano, Grady Martin on guitar, and Floyd "Lightnin'" Chance on double bass. The song was produced by Jim Vienneau, who suggested that Twitty should keep the growl in his voice when recording. "It's Only Make Believe" was released by MGM Records on side B of "I'll Try" on July 14, 1958.

The A-side "I'll Try" failed to catch on with the public in the States, and Twitty, believing that the record had failed, went home to work on the farm. However, a DJ in Columbus, Ohio took an interest in the B-side "It's Only Make Believe" and it became a hit in the city. It spread nationally and the song hit the Billboard chart in September, 1958, eventually reaching No. 1, on November 10 and 24. The single topped both U.S. and the UK Singles Chart, and became the only No. 1 pop single of his career. Twitty stated years later, on a segment of "Pop Goes The Country", that it was a hit in 22 countries, and had sold over eight million copies. He crossed over to country music in 1966.

Though Twitty recorded subsequent versions of "It's Only Make Believe", his original 1958 hit did not enter the country music charts. He recorded a 1970 duet of the song with Loretta Lynn on their first collaborative album, We Only Make Believe. Twitty joins in on the last verse in a 1988 uptempo cover by Ronnie McDowell, which was a No. 8 hit on the country music charts. Additionally, Twitty contributed to an alternative cover by McDowell.

== Charts ==
Conway Twitty version

=== Weekly charts ===
Chart (1958–1959)	Peak position
Australian Singles Chart	5
Canada (CHUM)	1
Italian Singles Chart	9
Norway (VG-lista)	2
UK Singles Chart	1
US Billboard Hot 100	1
US Billboard R&B Best Sellers in Stores	12
US Cash Box Top 100	1

=== All-time charts ===
Chart (1958-2018)	Position
US Billboard Hot 100	307

== Certifications ==
Region	Certification	Certified units/sales
United States (RIAA)	Gold	500,000^{‡}
^{‡} Sales+streaming figures based on certification alone.

== Glen Campbell version ==
"It's Only Make Believe"

Single by Glen Campbell

from the album The Glen Campbell Goodtime Album
- B-side: Pave Your Way Into Tomorrow
- Released: August 25, 1970
- Recorded: December 18, 1967
- Studio: Capitol Studios, Hollywood, California
- Genre: Country
- Length: 2:21
- Label: Capitol
- Songwriters: Jack Nance, Conway Twitty
- Producer: Al De Lory

Glen Campbell singles chronology
"Everything a Man Could Ever Need" (1970)	"It's Only Make Believe" (1970)	"Dream Baby (How Long Must I Dream)" (1971)

Glen Campbell recorded "It's Only Make Believe" for his album The Glen Campbell Goodtime Album, one of four albums he recorded in 1970. The song was arranged and produced by Al De Lory. The song was released as a single by Capitol Records backed with "Pave Your Way Into Tomorrow". It became a top ten hit in both the United States and United Kingdom.

=== Charts ===
==== Weekly charts ====
Chart (1970)	Peak position
Australian KMR	1
Belgium (Ultratop 50 Wallonia)	46
Canada Country Singles (RPM)	4
Canada Top Singles (RPM)	5
Euro Hit 50	10
Ireland (IRMA)	3
New Zealand (Listener)	2
UK Singles (Official Charts)	4
US Billboard Hot 100	10
US Hot Country Songs (Billboard)	3
US Billboard Easy Listening	2

==== Year-end charts ====
Chart (1970)	Position
US Billboard Hot 100	99
Canada Top Singles (RPM)	76
US Cash Box Top 100	66

== Other versions ==
- The Hollies recorded the song for their 1964 release album Stay With The Hollies
- In 1964, Billy Fury had a top 10 hit with his version in the UK and Ireland, which also went to No. 1 in Singapore.
- Brendan O'Brien and The Dixies recorded the song and it reached No. 4 on the Irish chart in 1964.
- Ronnie McDowell had a No. 8 single on the Billboard country chart in 1988 after recording the song as a duet with Twitty.
- The pop band Child released the song as a single in 1978, reaching the top ten in the UK Singles Chart.
- The rockabilly revival singer Robert Gordon covered the song, which reached No. 99 on the Billboard Country chart in 1979.
- Canadian country music singer Carroll Baker covered the song on her 1991 compilation Her Finest Collection. It was released as the album's first single and peaked at number 28 on the RPM Country Tracks chart.
- Queen guitarist Brian May recorded a version in 1998 for a T.E. Conway "Retro Rock Special" EP, later issued as part of a bonus disc to his Another World album.
- R&B singer Sam Moore recorded a version with Mariah Carey and Vince Gill that appeared on Moore's 2006 Overnight Sensational album.
- Horror punk band The Misfits recorded a version that was included on their 2003 album "Project 1950."

== See also ==
- List of number-one singles from the 1950s (UK)
- List of Hot 100 number-one singles of 1958 (U.S.)
- List of UK Singles Chart Christmas number ones
