= Try a Little Kindness (song) =

- Swedish release picture sleeve

Single by Glen Campbell

from the album Try a Little Kindness
- B-side: "Lonely My Lonely Friend"
- Released: October 1969
- Recorded: March/April 1969
- Studio: Capitol (Hollywood, California); United (Hollywood, California)
- Genre: Country, easy listening
- Length: 2:23
- Label: Capitol 2659
- Songwriters: Curt Sapaugh; Bobby Austin
- Producer: Al DeLory

Glen Campbell singles chronology
"True Grit" (1969)	"Try a Little Kindness" (1969)	"Honey Come Back" (1970)

"Try a Little Kindness" is a song written by Curt Sapaugh and Bobby Austin, first recorded by American country music singer Glen Campbell. The song was a hit on three different music charts: it peaked at number two for one week on the country charts, went to number one for one week on the Hot Adult Contemporary chart, and peaked at number 23 on the Billboard Hot 100.

== Chart performance ==
Chart (1969)	Peak position
Australian Go-Set Chart	10
Canadian RPM Country Tracks	1
Canadian RPM Top Singles	5
Canadian RPM Adult Contemporary	1
New Zealand (Listener)	4
U.K. Singles Chart	45
US Billboard Hot 100	23
US Hot Country Songs (Billboard)	2
U.S. Billboard Easy Listening	1
