= Slovo (band) =

English musical group

Slovo is a south London based music collective founded by former Faithless guitarist Dave Randall. Their latest line up includes the Italian singer Barbarella (Barbara Pugliese of Barbarella's Bang Bang) and US hip-hop artist Mike Ladd, who both contribute to the album Bread & Butterflies which was released 17 July 2020.

The group has previously released two other studio albums: nommo (2002) and Todo Cambia (2007).

For the first album nommo, Randall brought together Icelandic singer Emilíana Torrini, English singer Kirsty Hawkshaw, American hip hop recording artist Anthony Demore, drummer Max Roach, and the voices of Charlie Chaplin and Woody Guthrie. The album raised questions about the world and was in the words of The Sunday Times, "a wonderful album that is both stridently polemical and determinedly celebratory".

Randall then put together the Slovo live band with singer Andrea Britton, bass player Lucy Shaw, percussionist Sudha Kheterpal, and guitarist and keyboard player Andrew Phillips (Grasscut). The band toured extensively in Europe in 2003 and 2004 playing at many of the major European festivals and supporting Lamb and Damien Rice in the UK.

In 2005, Randall returned to live guitar duties with Faithless, but also began work on Slovo's second album Todo Cambia. The album featured vocalists Andrea Britton and hip hop MC Bobby Whiskers as well as the voices of Indian activist Arundhati Roy and US political prisoner and writer George Jackson. It was co-produced by Andy Marlow who also joined the band as bass player for a series of performances to coincide with the album's release in 2007.

During the next decade Randall toured again with Faithless as well as Sinéad O'Connor and Roland Gift. He also composed music for several documentary films and authored the book Sound System: The Political Power of Music (Pluto Press 2017) before returning to the Slovo project.

In 2020, he stated "Bread & Butterflies is Slovo's third studio album and I think it's our best yet. This feels like such a strange and pivotal time to be alive. We've tried to explore the issues affecting us all, and to capture some of the feelings they invoke. But above all this is an optimistic album, born of the belief that a better world is possible".

== Members ==
=== Current ===
- Dave Randall
- Barbarella (Barbara Pugliese)
- Mike Ladd
- Lya Reis

=== Previous ===
- Andrea Britton
- Bobby Whiskers
- Andy Marlow
- Nikolaj Bjerre
- Lucy Shaw
- Andrew Phillips
- Kirsty Hawkshaw
- Anthony Demore
- Jenny Adejayan

== Discography ==
- nommo (2002)
- Todo Cambia (2007)
- Bread & Butterflies (2020)
