= The Saints (British band) =

British instrumental band

- Also known as: The Ambassadors
- Origin: London, England
- Genres: Instrumental, pop, surf music
- Years active: 1963–1965
- Labels: Pye Records; Dot Records
- Spinoffs: The Peddlers
- Members: Tab Martin; Roy Phillips; Ricky Winter

The Saints were an English instrumental band, that worked for the record producer Joe Meek.

== Background ==
The Saints were the very first group that was used to back singer Heinz. The band were made up of bass guitarist Tab Martin (fresh from his stint with The Tornados), Roy Phillips (playing guitar), and drummer Ricky Winter (born Richard Winter, 27 September 1940, in Aldershot, Hampshire). They worked as the house band for Meek's productions, and as such backed Heinz, Andy Cavell (born 20 April 1945, Piraeus, Greece) and others. Their most notable recording was their cover of The Surfaris', "Wipe Out". They appeared as themselves in the British film, Live It Up!.

== Career ==
Having been a member The Tornados, Martin left the group about a month after they released the single "Globetrotter" and formed The Saints In 1963, they appeared in the Lance Comfort directed film, Live It Up! as Andy Cavell and the Saints. The film which starred David Hemmings, Jennifer Moss and Veronica Hurst also featured *Kenny Ball and his Jazzmen, Patsy Ann Noble, Gene Vincent and Sounds Incorporated. The Saints would become the backing group for singer Heinz. It was during this period that Heinz got better in his shows with more appreciation from his audiences.

After The Saints, Tab Martin and Roy Phillips formed The Song Peddlers, which would later become The Peddlers in 1964.

In 2004, it was reported by the Southern Daily Echo that drummer Ricky Winter was to attend a tribute night at the Eastleigh Railway Club for Heinz who had died four years prior from motor neurone disease.

== Singles discography ==
- "Wipe Out" / "Midgets" - Pye Records 7N 15548
- "Husky Team" / "Pigtails" - Pye 7N 15582
- "Surfin' John Brown" / "Big Breaker" - Dot Records 16528 (U.S. only single, as 'The Ambassadors')
- "Happy Talk", "Midgets" and "Parade of the Tin Soldiers", appeared on 304 Holloway Road, Joe Meek The Pye Years Volume 2 (Sequel Records NEX CD 216)
