= Oh Happy Day (Glen Campbell album) =

Studio album by Glen Campbell
- Released: April 1970
- Recorded: 1970
- Studio: Capitol (Hollywood)
- Genre: Gospel
- Label: Capitol
- Producer: Al De Lory

Glen Campbell chronology
Try a Little Kindness (1970)	Oh Happy Day (1970)	Norwood (1970)

Oh Happy Day is the fifteenth studio album by American singer/guitarist Glen Campbell, released in 1970 (see 1970 in music).

The record entered Billboard's Album charts May 1970, reaching a peak position of #38 and remaining on the chart for nineteen weeks.

== Track listing ==
Side 1:

1. "Someone Above" (Andrew Sandersier, James L. Faragher) – 3:20
2. "Oh Happy Day" (Edwin Hawkins) – 3:38
3. "I Believe" (Ervin Drake, Irvin Graham, Jimmy Shirl, Al Stillman) – 2:47
4. "He's Got the Whole World in His Hands" (Traditional, arranged by Marty Paich) – 2:33
5. "You'll Never Walk Alone" (Richard Rodgers, Oscar Hammerstein II) – 2:49

Side 2:

1. "One Pair of Hands" (Mike Curtis, Barbarita Campbell) – 2:28
2. "He" (Jack Richards, Richard Mullan) – 2:52
3. "People Get Ready" (Curtis Mayfield) – 1:58
4. "Angels in the Sky" (Dick Glasser) – 2:45
5. "Daddy Sang Bass" (Carl Perkins) – 2:12

== Personnel ==
- Glen Campbell – vocals, guitar
- Hal Blaine – drums
- Louis Shelton – acoustic guitar
- Tibor Zelig – violin

== Production ==
- Producer – Al De Lory
- Arranged by Al De Lory, Dennis McCarthy, Marty Paich
- Engineers – Joe Polito, Pete Abbott
- Photography – Ed Simpson/Capitol Photo Studio

== Charts ==
Album – Billboard (United States)

Chart	Entry date	Peak position	No. of weeks
Billboard Country Albums	May 16, 1970	16	20
Billboard 200	1970	38	?

Singles – Billboard (United States)

Year	Single	Hot Country Singles	Hot 100	Easy Listening
1970	"Oh Happy Day"	25	40	7
