= Goodbye Gemini =

1970 British film by Alan Gibson

- Theatrical poster
- Directed by: Alan Gibson
- Screenplay by: Edmund Ward
- Based on: Ask Agamemnon by Jenni Hall
- Produced by: Peter Snell
- Starring: Judy Geeson; Martin Potter; Alexis Kanner; Michael Redgrave
- Cinematography: Geoffrey Unsworth
- Edited by: Ernest Hosler
- Music by: Christopher Gunning
- Distributed by: Cinerama Releasing Corporation
- Release dates: 6 August 1970 (UK); 23 September 1970 (US)
- Running time: 89 minutes
- Country: United Kingdom
- Language: English
- Budget: £900,000 or £416,000

Goodbye Gemini (also known as Twinsanity) is a 1970 British psychological horror film directed by Alan Gibson and starring Judy Geeson, Martin Potter, Michael Redgrave, and Alexis Kanner. Based on the novel Ask Agamemnon by Jenni Hall, it concerns a pair of unusually close fraternal twins, Jacki and Julian, discovering Swinging London while home on Spring Break. Their experiences complicate the pair's relationship, which is already strained due to Julian's incestuous fascination with his sister, which he sees as a natural manifestation of what he believes to be the pair's hive-minded nature.

The film was produced at a time when conservative groups were beginning to react to the perceived social excesses of 1960s British culture. It was released concurrently with Freddie Francis's Mumsy, Nanny, Sonny and Girly (1970), another horror film which also dealt with an unusual familial relationship and contained a scene implying consensual brother-sister incest. Both films were targeted by the conservative press as endemic of everything wrong with contemporary British culture, resulting in protests and theaters refusing to show the films.

== Plot ==
Jacki and Julian Dewar, a pair of fraternal twins, arrive via bus in London on Spring break from university, while their father is in Mexico on business. The pair launch themselves into London's underground party scene, clubbing at strip bars, accompanied by Jacki's teddy bear, Agamemnon, whom the twins address – and regard – as a father figure. At one club the pair encounter Clive, a small-time pimp who survives by ingratiating himself with the wealthy and well-connected. Clive quickly endears himself to Jacki, while Clive's sometimes girlfriend Denise attempts to seduce Julian. He turns her down, intent on beginning an incestuous relationship with Jacki. Julian regards he and his sister as two halves of a hive mind, and sees incest as a natural expression of their closeness.

It becomes apparent that Clive is using Jacki and Julian's house to hide from a gangster to whom he owes a large gambling debt. One night after Jacki turns down Julian's advances, Clive plies him with whiskey and marijuana and takes him to a brothel where Clive keeps his "Circus"—a group of transvestite prostitutes who work for him. On Clive's orders, two of the prostitutes anally rape Julian while Clive takes photos.

Clive attempts to blackmail Julian with the photos in order to pay off his gambling debt. Meanwhile, Denise reveals the plan to Jacki, telling her that Clive has similarly raped and blackmailed other men in the past, going to far as to sell some of them into sexual slavery when they were unable to pay him. That night, Jacki comforts Julian, telling him that she knows what happened and that their relationship has not changed.

The next night, the twins bet a drunken Clive that he can't tell the two of them apart. Clive agrees, and the twins quickly dress the room in a ritualistic manner, erecting an "altar" for Agamemnon and dressing themselves in bed sheets altered to look like ceremonial robes. When Clive hesitates in identifying them properly, the twins stab him to death with Jacki's antique Tantōs. In the process of Clive's murder, Agamemnon is cut in half; upon seeing the bear, Jacki suffers a nervous breakdown and she flees, leaving Julian behind.

Jacki is discovered semi-catatonic on a dock by member of parliament James Harrington-Smith, who recognizes her from a party. Jackie, now suffering amnesia, slowly recovers at James' flat as she attempts to piece together what happened the night of Clive's death. Her discovery of Clive's body upon returning home inadvertently causes a citywide manhunt for both siblings; James lies to the police about Jacki's whereabouts the night of the murder, allowing blame to be shifted solely onto Julian.

Deducing that Julian has gone to hide in the same hotel where Clive kept his Circus, Jacki tells James that she'll convince him to turn himself in and to call the police if she hasn't returned after an hour. Jacki confronts Julian, whose mental state is rapidly deteriorating. Julian insists that all of their problems are a result of the pair not engaging in an incestuous relationship, which Julian believes would reinforce their "specialness" to the world. Meanwhile, James, fearful of the potential political scandal that could result from his connection to the twins, decides not to call the police.

Jacki attempts to convince Julian that she'll help him escape London, intending to return to James with information on Julian's whereabouts. An increasingly paranoid and delusional Julian attacks Jacki and crushes her windpipe, killing her. In a moment of lucidity, a distraught Julian apologizes to the dead Jacki before blowing out the room's pilot light and gassing himself to death.

== Cast ==
- Judy Geeson as Jacki
- Martin Potter as Julian
- Michael Redgrave as James Harrington-Smith
- Alexis Kanner as Clive Landseer
- Mike Pratt as Rod Barstowe
- Marion Diamond as Denise Pryce-Fletcher
- Freddie Jones as David Curry
- Peter Jeffrey as Detective Inspector Kingsley
- Terry Scully as Nigel Garfield
- Daphne Heard as Mrs. McLaren
- Laurence Hardy as Minister
- Joseph Fürst as Georgiu
- Brian Wilde as Taxi Driver
- Ricky Renée as Myra
- Barry Scott as Audrey

== Production ==
The film was shot on location in London, including a scene at the Royal Vauxhall Tavern, providing, per producer Peter Snell and star Judy Geeson in an audio commentary recorded in 2009, a snapshot of the London club scene as it existed at the time. At the time of filming, Geeson was at the height of her career following her role in To Sir With Love (1967) with Sidney Poitier; Sir Michael Redgrave, conversely, was near the end of his career. Recently diagnosed with Parkinson's disease, Redgrave would make only four more screen appearances.

The film makes significant divergences from the book, which was highly experimental in nature and involved the use of dream and fantasy sequences written in the style of a Greek tragedy, during which Agamemnon comes to life and interacts with Jacki. Most notably, the film presents the story in chronological order, whereas the book takes place within the frame narrative of an amnesiac Jacki slowly piecing together the events leading up to Clive's death as she convalesces at James' house. The film also places added emphasis on the incestuous undercurrent between Jacki and Julian's relationship, while the book focuses more on Jacki's budding relationship with James and her conflicted feelings about Clive. At the climax, James phones the police, resulting in a strike team laying siege to Julian's hotel room and arresting him before he can harm Jacki. The story ends with Jacki breaking from a fantasy encounter with a wounded but recovering Agamemnon to find James checking in on her.

== Soundtrack ==
The film soundtrack comprises instrumentals, party background music and songs by Christopher Gunning, The Peddlers with "Tell the World We're Not In", Jackie Lee and Peter Lee Stirling (Daniel Boone). The original soundtrack was issued in 1970 on DJM Records (DJLPS 408) and was reissued on CD by Harkit Records in 2005 (HRKCD 8092).

1. The Peddlers, "Tell The World We're Not In" (King) 2:48
2. "Jacki And Julian" (Gunning) 1:27
3. "Houseboat Party No.1" (Gunning) 1:51
4. "Nothing's Good And Nothing's Free" (Gunning, Sterling) 2:08
5. "Woodlands Hotel" (Gunning) 1:44
6. "Ritual Murder" (Gunning) 2:05
7. "Goodbye Gemini" (Ryan, Jones), vocals: Jackie Lee 2:37
8. "Houseboat Party No.2" (Gunning) 1:49
9. "Houseboat Party No.3" (Gunning) 2:02
10. "Forget About The Day" (Gunning), vocals: Peter Lee Stirling 2:40
11. "Vauxhall Tavern Strip Medley" (Gunning) 2:30
12. "Jacki's Nightmare" (Gunning) 1:39
13. "Jacki And Julian" (Gunning) 1:40

== Release ==
The film was released theatrically in London on 6 August 1970, as a double feature with Mumsy Nanny Sonny And Girly (1970). It was released in the United States the following month, opening at drive-in theaters in Passaic, New Jersey on 23 September 1970. In Los Angeles, the film was released on 2 December 1970, paired as a double bill with The Bird with the Crystal Plumage (1970).

=== Home media ===
Prism Entertainment released the film on video in the United States on 29 December 1988 under the name Twinsanity. Scorpion Releasing released a DVD edition of the film in January 2010. A limited edition Blu-ray was released in coordination with Screen Archives Entertainment on 24 March 2016, limited to 1,000 units.

== Critical reception ==
The Monthly Film Bulletin wrote:

Jenni Hall's first novel is a thriller which also explores the psychology of adolescence and of twinship. She seems to have thought of it in cinematic terms, with a complicated structure which begins with Jacki fleeing from the murder, so that the preceding events run through her mind like a film. The screenplay straightens it all out into a chronological sequence and uses this story of incest, homosexuality, blackmail and murder to make a lurid film about trendy, swinging London. ... Michael Redgrave plays the ageing MP trying desperately to keep up with fashion as if he were rather embarrassed by the whole thing (as well he might be). And Judy Geeson and Martin Potter are too normal to make the central semi-incestuous relationship convincing, despite the arty shots of them reflected in mirrors and their over-furnished house stuffed with exotic bric-a-brac. 'You can't remain children all the time,' someone says. You can, if the people who made this shallow, superficial film are anything to go by.

The Radio Times Guide to Films gave the film 2/5 stars, writing: "Set at the fag end of the Swinging Sixties, this exploitation tale stars Judy Geeson and Martin Potter as unnaturally close twins Jacki and Julian. Newly arrived in London, they soon fall in with bohemian Clive (Alexis Kanner, sporting the most miraculous sideburns) and his free-loving Chelsea set. It all turns nasty when Clive embroils Julian in a blackmail plot to get the better of gangster (albeit in a floral cravat) Mike Pratt. Despite the best efforts of Geeson and Freddie Jones as a camp antiques dealer, wooden performances and an inconsistent script make the film little more than an interesting, if rather dubious, 1960s snapshot."

Leslie Halliwell said: "Abysmally over-the-top melodrama with a swinging London backdrop. Its immaculate appearance only makes matters worse."

== Sources ==
- Spencer, Kristopher (2008). Film and Television Scores, 1950–1979: A Critical Survey by Genre. Jefferson, North Carolina: McFarland. ISBN 978-0-786-45228-6.
- Young, R. G. (2000). The Encyclopedia of Fantastic Film: Ali Baba to Zombies. New York City, New York: Hal Leonard Corporation. ISBN 978-1-557-83269-6.
