= Everything a Man Could Ever Need =

- Norwegian release picture sleeve

Single by Glen Campbell

from the album Norwood (soundtrack)
- B-side: "Norwood (Me and My Guitar)"
- Released: June 1970
- Genre: Country
- Length: 2:26
- Label: Capitol
- Songwriter: Mac Davis
- Producer: Neely Plumb

Glen Campbell singles chronology
"Oh Happy Day" (1970)	"Everything a Man Could Ever Need" (1970)	"It's Only Make Believe" (1970)

"Everything a Man Could Ever Need" is a song written by Mac Davis, and recorded by American country music artist Glen Campbell. It was released in June 1970 as the first single from his album Norwood. The song peaked at number 5 on the Billboard Hot Country Singles chart. It also reached number 1 on the RPM Country Tracks chart in Canada.

== Chart performance (Campbell version) ==
Chart (1970)	Peak position
US Hot Country Songs (Billboard)	5
US Billboard Hot 100	52
U.S. Billboard Easy Listening	3
Canadian RPM Country Tracks	1
Canadian RPM Top Singles	47
U.K. Singles Chart	32

== Cover versions ==
- The song was recorded by Roy Drusky for his 1970 album All My Hard Times.
- Australian Matt Flinders covered the song for his 1972 album Matt Flinders On Television.

== Use in other media ==
Glen Campbell's version was used in the 2002 film Heartlands, starring Michael Sheen and Mark Addy.
