= Try a Little Kindness =

Studio album by Glen Campbell
- Released: January 1970
- Recorded: 1969
- Studios: United (Hollywood); Capitol (Hollywood)
- Genres: Country, folk
- Label: Capitol
- Producer: Al De Lory

Glen Campbell chronology
Glen Campbell Live (1969)	Try a Little Kindness (1970)	Oh Happy Day (1970)

Singles from Try a Little Kindness
- 1. "Try a Little Kindness" Released: October 1969; 2. "Honey Come Back" Released: January 1970

Professional ratings
Review scores
Source	Rating
AllMusic	3.5/5 stars
The Encyclopedia of Popular Music	3/5 stars
The Rolling Stone Album Guide	2/5 stars

Try a Little Kindness is the fourteenth studio album by American singer/guitarist Glen Campbell, released in 1970. The title track was one of Campbell's favorite songs.

The album peaked at No. 28 on the UK Albums Chart.

== Track listing ==
=== Side one ===
1. "Try a Little Kindness" (Curt Sapaugh, Bobby Austin) – 2:23
2. "Both Sides Now" (Joni Mitchell) – 3:44
3. "For My Woman's Love" (Ben Peters) – 3:07
4. "Country Girl" (Craig Smith) – 2:51
5. "All the Way" (Jimmy Van Heusen, Sammy Cahn) – 3:10
6. "Where Do You Go" (Ed Penney, John Domurad) – 2:45

=== Side two ===
1. "Honey Come Back" (Jimmy Webb) – 3:00
2. "Folk Singer" (C. E. Daniels) – 2:45
3. "Love Is Not a Game" (Jerry Goldstein) – 2:10
4. "Once More with Feeling" (Shirley Nelson) – 3:16
5. "And the World Keeps Spinning" (Ron Green, Ron Price) – 2:37
6. "Home Again" (Larry Rintye, Jesse Hodges) – 2:48

== Personnel ==
- Glen Campbell – vocals, acoustic guitar
- Al Casey – acoustic guitar
- Joe Osborn – bass
- Carol Kaye – bass
- Hal Blaine – drums
- Bob Felts – percussion

== Production ==
- Producer – Al De Lory
- Arranged by Al De Lory, Marty Paich
- Conductor – Al De Lory
- Engineers – Joe Polito, Pete Abbot

== Charts ==
Album – Billboard (United States)

Chart	Entry date	Peak position	No. of weeks
Billboard Country Albums	July 2, 1970	4	18
Billboard 200	1970	12	28

Singles – Billboard (United States)

Year	Single	Hot Country Singles	Hot 100	Easy Listening
1970	"Try a Little Kindness"	2	23	1
1970	"Honey Come Back"	2	19	4
