= Dean Parrish =

American singer (1942–2021)

Background information
- Born: Philip Anastasi; December 30, 1942; New York City, U.S.
- Died: June 8, 2021 (aged 78) New York City, U.S.
- Genres: Northern soul
- Occupation: Singer

Dean Parrish (born Philip Anastasi, or Anastasia; December 30, 1942 – June 8, 2021) was an American singer from New York City, best known for the song "I'm on My Way", which became noted for being the penultimate record that was played at the last Northern soul all-nighter at the Wigan Casino. In the 2000s, in collaboration with Lord Large, he had a minor hit with "Left Right & Centre".

== Background ==
Anastasi was born to Italian parents and was raised in Little Italy, New York. He lived by the train lines in Brooklyn. Anastasi sang second tenor in a street corner doo-wop group and attended the School of Industrial Arts. He was spotted by the same manager who looked after The Mystics and The Passions who tried to convince Anastasi to go from second tenor to lead/solo singer.

== Career ==
=== 1960s - 1990s ===
The Peppermint Lounge was New York's premier nightclub in the very early 1960s. Anastasi frequented the establishment and would eventually appear on the bill. On the advice of The Ronettes' lead singer, Ronnie Spector, he changed his name to Dean Parrish and began his own recording career in 1964.

He signed a recording contract with the Laurie record label. Between 1964 and 1967 Parrish recorded for four major U.S. labels Laurie, Warner Bros., Musicor Records and Boom.

Parrish achieved some success with his soul singles "I'm On My Way", "Tell Her", "Determination", "Skate" and "Bricks, Broken Bottles and Sticks". He toured on Dick Clark's Caravan of Stars, appearing alongside such leading luminaries as Mitch Ryder and the Detroit Wheels, The Capitols and Lou Christie; he even appeared on a Motown revue bill with The Supremes. However, his singing career began to fade.

In 1967 Parrish reverted to his original name, and became an actor, who began to appear on television and in films. He kept his hand in musically by playing guitar with Herbie Mann, and sometimes as frontman for The Rosecrucians and Steeplechase. He worked as a session musician with Jimi Hendrix and Santana in 1970, and played guitar with Bob Marley in 1972.

The Northern soul scene had taken a firm hold in the nightclubs of the mid-1970s in the United Kingdom where rare American soul music recordings were played. Parrish's recording of "I'm On My Way" came to the attention of Russ Winstanley, a disc jockey at the Wigan Casino. He began playing the gramophone record and it soon became one of the more popular records at the venue. It was re-released in 1975 on the UK Records label, and sold around 200,000 copies. The track reached number 38 in the UK Singles Chart in February 1975. It has consequently gone on to sell over a million copies.

=== 2000s - 2020s ===
Interest in Parrish's mid 1960s recording career began to gain in popularity but Parrish himself remained completely unaware of his popularity on the other side of the Atlantic and the Wigan Casino itself until the early 2000s.

He had changed his name back to Phil Anastasi and no one had been able to track him, with his former U.S. labels no longer in touch with him. However, in 2001, Parrish contacted Winstanley, and he made his first trip to the UK, some thirty years since his last concert performance. Parrish found himself performing in front of thousands at a Prestatyn, Wales based Northern soul weekend. More trips to Europe followed as well as a growing number of acting roles.

=== "Left Right & Centre" ===
Parrish met up with Paul Weller's guitarist and Ocean Colour Scene member, Steve Cradock. Cradock was a friend of Winstanley's and handed Parrish "Left Right and Centre", a song Weller had composed at the age of fifteen. Parrish recorded the song with Lord Large in 2006. The song was included on Large's The Lord's First XI that also featured recordings by Glenn Tilbrook, Clem Curtis, Roy Phillips and Linda Lewis. Credited to Lord Large Feat. Dean Parrish, the record was a minor hit. It was at no. 4 on the Music Week Townsend Top Ten list and No. 7 on the Top 10 Indie Singles chart for the week of 19 August. It also entered the National UK chart that week, peaking at no. 93.

=== Further activities ===
Back in New York he recruited some of his old friends (including members of Santana) and came up with a new single, a cover version of Timi Yuro's, "It'll Never Be Over for Me", his first solo single for 41 years. His debut album, Determination - The Northern Soul Sound of Dean Parrish, was due to be released in 2008.

Under the name 'Philip J. Anastasia', he appeared as an emcee in an episode of The Sopranos.

I'm On My Way – The Dean Parrish Story was broadcast on Saturday 12 January 2008 on BBC Radio 2. Billed as 'The Northern soul star sold over one million records, but barely received a penny for his work. Pete Mitchell travels to New York to track down Parrish, revealing a remarkable story that takes in The Sopranos and Jimi Hendrix along the way.'

He died on 8 June 2021, at the age of 78.
