= Birth (The Peddlers song) =

Single by The Peddlers
- Released: 1969
- Genre: Soul; pop
- Songwriter(s): Roy Phillips

The Peddlers singles chronology
"That's Life" (1969)	"Birth" (1969)	"Girlie" (1970)

"Birth" was a hit song for English group, The Peddlers, in 1969.

== Background ==
The song written by Roy Phillips and released on CBS 4449. It was referred to as a stunningly innovative composition by The Guinness Encyclopedia of Popular Music. It is from their 1969 album, Birthday which also contains the follow-up hit "Girlie".

== Chart performance ==
"Birth" reached No. 17 in the UK on September 20, 1969, during a nine-week run in the chart. The song peaked in Australia at No. 41.

2024 saw Roy Phillips re-arrangement of BIRTH enter the UK Heritage chart, reaching the number 3 position, This time with Dave Lea as the vocalist.

== Other versions ==
English group Barron Knights covered the song and it appears on their 1973 album, Barron Knights.
