= Live It Up! (film) =

1963 British film by Lance Comfort

- Directed by: Lance Comfort
- Written by: Lyn Fairhurst (original story and screenplay)
- Starring: Musical guests: Kenny Ball and his Jazzmen; Gene Vincent; Patsy Ann Noble; Acting roles: David Hemmings; Jenny Moss; Steve Marriott; John Mitchell; Dave Clark
- Cinematography: Basil Emmott
- Music by: Joe Meek (songs)
- Distributed by: Rank Organisation
- Release date: 1963
- Running time: 75 minutes
- Country: England
- Language: English

Live It Up! (U.S. title: Sing and Swing) is a 1963 British musical second feature ('B') film directed by Lance Comfort and starring David Hemmings, featuring Gene Vincent, Jenny Moss, the Outlaws, Patsy Ann Noble, the Saints, Heinz Burt and Kenny Ball and His Jazzmen. The film also featured Steve Marriott (later singer and guitarist with Small Faces and Humble Pie), and Mitch Mitchell, later the drummer of The Jimi Hendrix Experience. It was written by Lyn Fairhurst and filmed at Pinewood Studios.

Two years later, Hemmings and Comfort followed up with the sequel Be My Guest, also directed by Comfort.

== Plot summary ==
Dave Martin and his friends Phil, Ron and Ricky are Post Office messenger boys who have formed their own four piece rock 'n' roll beat group, the Smart Alecs. They pool their resources to make a tape recording of their original song "Live It Up". Dave is given a month by his unsympathetic father Herbert to get it published or give up his musical dreams. Sent with a special delivery to film producer Mark Watson, Dave gets into the studio where a musical is being made. He is stunned by a falling piece of equipment and is afterwards photographed with the star as compensation. Next day, when the accident and photo are publicised in a newspaper his friends upbraid him for not mentioning their tape to the producer. He promises to approach Watson again but then discovers that it has vanished. Watson finds it at the studio and, with the group unknown, tries to interest Radio and T.V. in a mystery search. Finally with the help of Dave's girlfriend Jill and his father, Watson and columnist Nancy Spain are brought by taxi to meet the group and the Smart Alecs then make good.

== Cast ==
- David Hemmings as Dave Martin
- Jennifer Moss as Jill
- John Pike as Phil
- Heinz Burt as Ron
- Steve Marriott as Ricky (credited Stephen Marriott)
- Joan Newell as Margaret Martin
- Ed Devereaux as Herbert Martin
- Veronica Hurst as Kay
- Penny Lambirth as Barbara
- Peter Glaze as Mike Moss
- David Bauer as Mark Watson
- Anthony Ashdown as Bob
- Douglas Ives as Bingo
- Paul Hansard as film director
- Geoff L'Cise as assistant
- Nancy Spain as columnist
- Peter Haigh as announcer
- Peter Noble as interviewer
- Trevor Maskell as Aldo
- Mitch Mitchell as Andrews (credited as John Mitchell)
- Anthony Sheppard as commissionaire
- Dave Clark as recording man (credited as David Clark)
- Pat Gilbert as housekeeper

=== Musical interludes ===
All music and lyrics by Joe Meek, with the exception of "Accidents Will Happen" by Norrie Paramor and Bob Barrett.

- Kenny Ball and his Jazzmen, "Rondo" and "Hand Me Down My Walking Shoes"
- Heinz, "Live It Up" and "Don't You Understand"
- Trisha Noble (credited as Patsy Ann Noble), "Accidents Will Happen"
- Gene Vincent, "Tempation Baby"
- Jennifer Moss, "Please Let It Happen To Me"
- Sounds Incorporated (featuring Tony Newman), "Keep Moving"
- The Outlaws (featuring Ritchie Blackmore, Chas Hodges, Ken Lundgren and Mick Underwood), "Law And Disorder"
- Kim Roberts, "For Loving Me This Way"
- Andy Cavell and the Saints, "Don't Take You From Me"

The song "Live It Up" featured at the end of the film is not credited because the "group" shown playing it (Hemmings and Heinz on guitars, Pike on bass and Marriott on drums) were not the actual recording artists.

== Reception ==
The Monthly Film Bulletin wrote: "Something of a festival of electric guitars and echo chamber effects, the string of musical numbers are chiefly in the current pop and beat idiom, though Kenny Ball and his Jazzmen contribute a couple of welcome items in traditional jazz style – even if one of these is a perversion of the Turkish March from Mozart's A major Piano Sonata. The slight story has one good moment in which the boys briefly consider, and quickly reject, the possibility of calling their group "The Maggots".

Variety wrote: "Best thing about Sing and Swing is that, for a rock 'n' roller, it's comparatively quiet. Must be that famous British understatement. Producer-director Lance Comfort has pulled quite a feat, finding space for 11 musical numbers in a 78-minute feature, although none of them are likely to push the Beatles off the charts. ... Bit of originality is introduced with possibly rock 'n' roll's first bleached-blonde singer. A male singer. Well, it didn't hurt wrestling, did it? Heinz Burt, the peroxide practitioner, is something of a mystery. He has about two words of dialog but does all the singing of the former ("Live It Up") title number. ... The musical numbers, once the numbness takes effect, sound alike. David Bauer, as an American film producer, tells his publicity gal (Veronica Hurst) that all successful films have "Don't" in the title. This one doesn't."

The Radio Times Guide to Films gave the film 2/5 stars, writing: "You'd hardly know that the Beatles were in the process of transforming the British pop scene from some of the sounds presented in this determinedly traditional musical. Lance Comfort was a decent director, but he was hardly cutting edge and he handles the drama as unimaginatively as he stages the songs. Icon-in-waiting David Hemmings looks distinctly uncomfortable as the Post Office messenger who defies trad dad Ed Devereux to bid for the top, prompting a hackneyed subplot about an audition and a big American producer."
