= Eddie Floyd =

American soul-R&B singer and songwriter (born 1937)

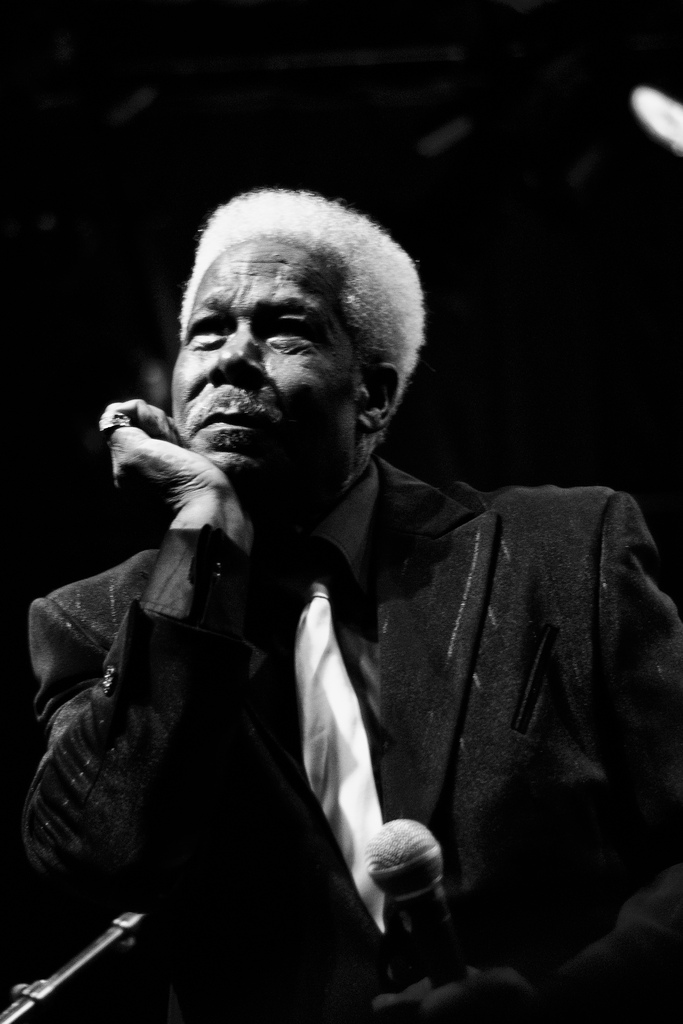
- Eddie Floyd in 2000

Background information
- Born: Eddie Lee Floyd; June 25, 1937 (age 89); Montgomery, Alabama, United States
- Genres: R&B, soul; Memphis soul; Southern soul
- Occupations: Singer; songwriter
- Years active: 1956–present
- Labels: Stax; Concord

Eddie Lee Floyd (born June 25, 1937) is an American R&B and soul singer and songwriter, best known for his work on the Stax record label in the 1960s and 1970s, including a No. 1 R&B hit song, "Knock on Wood".

== Early life and education ==
Floyd was born in Montgomery, Alabama, to Florence Floyd, a nurse, and Prince Edward, a steelworker. He had four siblings: Joe, Benny, Dave, and Louise.

In 1950, at age thirteen, Floyd was sent to Alabama Industrial School for Negro Children at Mount Meigs, a juvenile correctional facility, after fighting with the principal. He began his formal music studies there, learning theory and singing in a choir.

After three years at Mount Meigs, Floyd moved to Detroit, Michigan, where he lived with his aunt and uncle, Robert and Catherine West. Robert West was an impresario of the Detroit music scene and the founder of Lu Pine Records.

== Career ==
At age sixteen, Floyd founded The Falcons, which also featured Mack Rice. They were forerunners to future Detroit vocal groups such as The Temptations and The Four Tops. Their most successful songs included "You're So Fine" and later, when Wilson Pickett was recruited into the group as the lead singer, "I Found a Love." Pickett then embarked on a solo career, and The Falcons disbanded.

Floyd signed a contract with the Memphis-based Stax Records as a songwriter in 1965. He wrote a hit song, "Comfort Me," recorded by Carla Thomas. He then teamed with Stax's guitarist Steve Cropper to write songs for Wilson Pickett, now signed to Atlantic Records. Atlantic distributed Stax and Jerry Wexler brought Pickett from New York City to work with Booker T. & the MGs. The Pickett sessions were successful, yielding several pop and R&B hits, including the Floyd co-written "Ninety-Nine and a Half (Won't Do)" and "634-5789 (Soulsville, U.S.A.).”

In 1966, Floyd recorded a song initially written for Otis Redding. Wexler convinced Stax president Jim Stewart to release Floyd's version. The Steve Cropper-Eddie Floyd "Knock on Wood" launched Floyd's solo career, and has been covered by over a hundred different artists from David Bowie to Count Basie. Eventually, Redding would cut an R&B hit version of the song in 1967 as a duet with Carla Thomas. It became a disco hit for Amii Stewart in 1979.

Floyd was one of Stax's most consistent and versatile artists. He scored several more hits on his own, including "I've Never Found a Girl (To Love Me Like You Do)" and "Raise Your Hand,” which was covered by both Janis Joplin and Bruce Springsteen.

The song "Big Bird" (featuring Booker T. Jones on organ and guitar, Al Jackson, Jr. on drums, and Donald "Duck" Dunn on bass) was written while Floyd waited in a London airport for a plane back to the United States for Otis Redding's funeral.

Floyd's career did not keep him from being one of the label's most productive writers. Almost every Stax artist recorded Floyd material, often co-written with either Cropper or Jones, including Sam & Dave ("You Don't Know What You Mean to Me"), Rufus Thomas ("The Breakdown"), Otis Redding ("I Love You More Than Words Can Say"), and Johnnie Taylor's "Just the One (I've Been Looking For).” The latter played during the opening credits of director Harold Ramis's film Bedazzled.

In 1980, Floyd released material on the UK record label I-Spy Records, owned and created by the UK band Secret Affair. He joined old Stax collaborators Cropper and Dunn, and fronted The Blues Brothers Band on a series of world tours, and in 1998, Floyd and former Falcon Wilson Pickett appeared on screen dueting on "634-5789" in Blues Brothers 2000.

As well as singing with The Blues Brothers Band, Floyd has been the special guest with former Rolling Stone Bill Wyman's Rhythm Kings on several dates in the US and the UK.

In 2008, Floyd returned to Stax Records, which was owned by Concord Music Group since 2004. His first new album in six years, Eddie Loves You So, was released in July 2008.

In November 2012, Floyd was inducted into the Carolina Beach Music Hall of Fame as a Pioneer Award Recipient.

In December 2012, Floyd released a new album at Christmas time. Eddie's son, Anthony Floyd, sings with him in the single, Don’t Forget About James Brown, and the album, Tonight’s The Night. In 2016 he was inducted into the National Rhythm & Blues Hall of Fame

Eddie Floyd was named to the Memphis Music Hall of Fame in 2018.

On 1 September 2017, at age 80, Floyd performed live at the Royal Albert Hall BBC Proms with Jools Holland and his Rhythm & Blues Orchestra, in a tribute concert to 50 years of Stax Records synonymous with Southern soul music.

On February 28, 2020, Rock House Records released Eddie Floyd's 1979 recording "Guess It Wasn't Meant to Be."

== Discography ==
=== Albums ===
- Knock on Wood – (1967) – Stax
- Looking Back – (1968) – Ember Records
- I've Never Found a Girl – (1969) – Stax
- Rare Stamps – (1969) – Stax
- You've Got to Have Eddie – (1969) – Stax
- California Girl – (1970) – Stax
- Down to Earth – (1971) – Stax
- Baby Lay Your Head Down – (1973) – Stax
- Soul Street – (1974) – Stax
- Experience – (1978) – Malaco Records
- Flashback – (1988) – Ichiban Records
- Red, White & Blues (The Blues Brothers Band) – (1992) – Turnstyle Records
- Gotta Make a Comeback – (1999) – Plane Records
- To the Bone – (2002) – Rock House Records
- Eddie Loves You So – (2008) – Stax
- At Christmas Time – (2012) – Stax
- Down by the Sea – (2013) – Stax

=== Singles ===
Year	Single (US)	A-Side	B-Side	Chart positions			
Year	Single (US)	A-Side	B-Side	US Pop	US R&B	CAN	UK
1962	Lu Pine 115	"Will I Be the One"	"Set My Soul on Fire"	–	–	–	–
1962	Lu Pine 122	"A Deed to Your Heart"	"I'll Be Home"	–	–	–	–
1964	Safice 334	"Never Get Enough of Your Love"	"Baby Bye"	–	–	–	–
1964	Safice 336	"I'll Be Home for Christmas"	"Can This Be Christmas"	–	–	–	–
1965	Safice 338	"Make Up Your Mind"	"No, No, No"	–	–	–	–
1965	Atlantic 2275	"Hush Hush"	"Drive On"	–	–	–	–
1966	Stax 187	"Things Get Better"	"Good Love, Bad Love"	–	–	–	31 (1967)
1966	Stax 194	"Knock on Wood"	"Got to Make a Comeback"	28	1	67	19
1967	Stax 208	"Raise Your Hand"	"I've Just Been Feeling Bad"	79	16	74	42
1967	Stax 219	"Don't Rock the Boat"	"This House"	98	–	–	–
1967	Stax 223	"Love Is a Doggone Good Thing"	"Hey Now"	97	30	–	–
1967	Stax 233	"On a Saturday Night"	"Under My Nose"	92	22	–	–
1967	Stax 246	"Big Bird"	"Holding On with Both Hands"	132	–	–	–
1968	Stax 0002	"I've Never Found a Girl (To Love Me Like You Do)"	"I'm Just the Kind of Fool"	40	2	41	–
1968	Stax 0012	"Bring It On Home to Me"	"Sweet Things You Do"	17	4	24	–
1969	Stax 0025	"I've Got to Have Your Love"	"Girl I Love You"	102	50	–	
1969	Stax 0036	"Don't Tell Your Mama (Where You've Been)"	"Consider Me"	73	18	84	–
1969	Stax 0040	"Soul-A-Lujah Pt. I" (with W. Bell, C. Thomas & J. Taylor)	"Pt. II" (instrumental)	–	–	–	–
1969	Stax 0051	"Why Is the Wine Sweeter (On the Other Side)"	"People Get It Together"	98	30	–	–
1970	Stax 0060	"California Girl"	"Woodman"	45	11	56	–
1970	Stax 0072	"My Girl"	"Laurie"	116	43	–	–
1970	Stax 0077	"The Best Years of My Life"	"My Little Girl"	118	29	–	–
1971	Stax 0087	"Oh, How It Rained"	"When My Baby Said Goodbye"	–	–	–	–
1971	Stax 0095	"Blood Is Thicker Than Water"	"Have You Heard the Word"	–	33	–	–
1972	Stax 0109	"Yum Yum Yum (I Want Some)"	"Tears of Joy"	122	49	–	–
1972	Stax 0134	"You're Good Enough (To Me Baby)"	"Spend All You Have on Love"	–	–	–	–
1973	Stax 0158	"Lay Your Loving on Me"	"Knock on Wood" (live)	–	–	–	–
1973	Stax 0171	"Baby Lay Your Head Down"	"Check Me Out"	–	50 / 58	–	–
1973	Stax 0188	"I Wanna Do Things for You"	"We've Been Through Too Much Together"	–	–	–	–
1974	Stax 0209	"Guess Who"	"Something to Write Home About"	–	–	–	–
1974	Stax 0216	"Soul Street"	"Highway Man"	–	65	–	–
1974	Stax 0232	"I Got a Reason to Smile"	"Stealing Love"	–	–	–	–
1975	Stax 0239	"Talk to the Man"	"I Got a Reason to Smile"	–	–	–	–
1975	Stax 0251	"I'm So Glad I Met You"	"I'm So Grateful"	–	–	–	–
1977	Malaco 1032	"Somebody Touch Me"	"Never Too Old"	–	–	–	–
1977	Mercury 73964	"It's Me"	"If You Really Love Me"	–	–	–	–
1978	Mercury 74003	"Disco Summer"	"Do It in the Water"	–	–	–	–
"–" denotes releases that did not chart or were not released in that territory.
