= I've Never Found a Girl (To Love Me Like You Do) =

Song by Eddie Floyd

from the album I've Never Found a Girl
- A-side: "I've Never Found a Girl (To Love Me Like You Do)"
- B-side: "I'm Just The Kind Of Fool"
- Released: June 1968
- Genre: R&B
- Length: 2:40
- Label: Stax STA-0002
- Composer: B. Jones-E. Floyd-A. Isbell
- Producer: Steve Cropper

"I've Never Found a Girl (To Love Me Like You Do)" was a 1968 single for Eddie Floyd. It became a hit for him that year, registering on the Billboard, Cash Box and Record World charts.

== Background ==
Eddie Floyd co-wrote the song with Alvertis Isbell and Booker T. Jones. The single, backed with "I’m Just the Kind of Fool" which was produced by Steve Cropper, was released on Stax-Volt 0002 in 1968. It nearly made it to number one on the Billboard Best Selling Rhythm & Blues Singles chart but was kept of that position by "You're All I Need to Get By" by Marvin Gaye and Tammi Terrell.

== Reception ==
The track was reviewed in the July 6, 1968, issue of Cash Box. It was in the "Best Bets" section. With Floyd's status as a hitmaker already established, the single was given strong top 40 potential. The reviewer referred to it as having a soft summertime feel and called it a standout. In the Record World Where's It At section for the week of July 20, 1968, the single was referred to as a Biggest Smash. For the week of August 3, it was noted as a Smash of the Week in the Record World R&B Where's It At section.

== Airplay ==
For the week of July 20, 1968, Kal Rudman in his Money Music section in Record World confirmed that the single was a hit in Atlanta and Memphis.

In the August 3, 1968, issue of Cash Box, the 24 July tally for the radio stations that had added "I've Never Found a Girl (To Love Me Like You Do)" to their schedule was at 18% to date.

== Charts ==
=== Billboard ===
==== Best Selling Rhythm & Blues Singles chart ====
For the week of 13 July, 1968, the single made its debut at no. 32 on the Billboard Best Selling Rhythm & Blues Singles chart. On 24 August it peaked at no. 2 just behind "Stay in My Corner" by The Dells. It held the number 2 position for one more week with "You're All I Need to Get By" by Marvin Gaye and Tammi Terrell in the number 1 spot. It spent a total of fourteen weeks in the chart.

==== Hot 100 chart ====
The single debuted on the Billboard Hot 100 chart the week of 27 July 1968. Spending a total of nine weeks in the chart it peaked at no. 40.

=== Cash Box ===
==== Top 50 in R&B Locations chart ====
For the week of 20 July, the single debuted at no. 49 in the Top 50 In R&B Locations chart. For the week of 31 August, the single reached the peak position of no. 14. It held that position for one more week. Its last charting position was at no. 28 for the week of 21 September.

==== Top 100 chart ====
For the week of 3 August, the single debuted at no. 96 on the Cash Box Top 100 chart. On the week of 7 September, and having been in the chart for six weeks the single peaked at no. 47.

=== Record World ===
==== Top 50 R&B chart ====
For the week of 20 July, the single made its debut at no. 37 in the Record World Top 50 r&b chart. On the week of 14 September, the single peaked at no. 20. It held that position for one more week before exiting the chart.

==== 100 Top Pops chart ====
For the week of 3 August, the single debuted at no. 100 in the Record World 100 Top Pops chart. For the week of 7 September, and on its sixth charting week, the single peaked at no. 45. It held that position for one more week before its exit from the chart.

=== RPM Weekly (Canada) ===
==== The RPM 100 chart ====
The single made its debut at no. 84 on the RPM Weekly 100 chart for the week of 19 August. It peaked at no. 41 for the week of 23 September.

== Other versions ==
Clem Curtis who was the former lead singer for The Foundations recorded a version of " I've Never Found a Girl (To Love Me Like You Do)". Backed with "Point of No Return" it was released on Pye 45150. It came up for review by Peter Jones in the 24 Jun 1972 issue of Record Mirror. Jones said that it had a good off-beat that would lead to hand clapping and foot stomping. He couldn't elaborate on the lazy feeling of the song but said that it was a good production and that Clem had "the feel" and that it was a chart chance. It was also reviewed by Melody Maker in the same period. The reviewer said that it was a nice record that could do well in discos and there was a chart possibility.

Curtis' version, along with the B side, "Point of No Return" was included on the Foundations' Am I Grooving You: The Pye Anthology compilation. It also appears on the northern soul compilations, Up All Night - 32 Northern Soul Spinners and Northern Soul (Ain't Nothin' But A Houseparty).

Joseph Henry backed by The Mighty Imperials had a version released on the Daptone label in 2002. It was credited to Joseph Henry & The Mighty Imperials. His version was described by Stereogum as harder and heavier and funkier with Henry's weathered voice adding a level of grit that countered Floyd's.
