= The Glen Campbell Goodtime Album =

Studio album by Glen Campbell
- Released: September 1970
- Recorded: 1970
- Studios: TTG (Hollywood, California)
- Genre: Country
- Label: Capitol
- Producer: Al De Lory

Glen Campbell chronology
| Norwood (1970) | The Glen Campbell Goodtime Album (1970) | The Last Time I Saw Her (1971) |

The Glen Campbell Goodtime Album is the 19th album by American country singer/guitarist Glen Campbell, released in 1970.

== Track listing ==
=== Side one ===
1. "It's Only Make Believe" (Conway Twitty, Jack Nance) – 2:18
2. "MacArthur Park" (Jimmy Webb) – 4:47
3. "As Far as I'm Concerned" (Bobby Russell) – 2:45
4. "Just Another Piece of Paper" (Jimmy Webb) – 2:09
5. "Pave Your Way into Tomorrow" (Billy Graham) – 1:36

=== Side two ===
1. "My Way" (Jacques Revaux, Claude François, Paul Anka) – 4:14
2. "Dream Sweet Dreams About Me" (John Ragsdale) – 2:37
3. "Bridge Over Troubled Water" (Paul Simon) – 3:20
4. "Turn It Around in Your Mind" (Jerry Reed) – 2:11
5. "Funny Kind of Monday" (Mitchell Torok, Ramona Redd) – 2:04

== Production ==
- Producer – Al De Lory
- Arranged by Al De Lory (1, 3-5, 7, 10), Marty Paich (6, 8, 9), Dennis McCarthy (2)
- Photography – Gordon Alexandre, Rick Rankin

== Reception ==
Professional ratings
Review scores
| Source | Rating |
|---|---|
| Allmusic | 3/5 stars |

== Chart performance ==
=== Album ===
| Chart | Peak position |
|---|---|
| Billboard Country Albums | 2(1) |
| Billboard 200 | 27 |

=== Single ===
It's Only Make Believe
| Chart (1970) | Peak position |
|---|---|
| Australian KMR | 1 |
| Belgium (Ultratop 50 Wallonia) | 46 |
| Canada Country Singles (RPM) | 4 |
| Canada Top Singles (RPM) | 5 |
| Euro Hit 50 | 10 |
| Ireland (IRMA) | 3 |
| New Zealand Singles Chart | 2 |
| UK Singles (Official Charts) | 4 |
| US Billboard Hot 100 | 10 |
| US Hot Country Songs (Billboard) | 3 |
| U.S. Billboard Easy Listening | 2 |

Year-end chart
| Chart (1970) | Peak position |
|---|---|
| U.S. Billboard Hot 100 | 99 |
| Canada Top Singles (RPM) | 76 |
| U.S. Cashbox Top 100 | 66 |
