= Norwood (soundtrack) =

Soundtrack album by Glen Campbell
- Released: June 1970
- Recorded: 1970
- Genre: Folk
- Label: Capitol Records
- Producer: Neely Plumb

Glen Campbell chronology
Oh Happy Day (1970)	Norwood (1970)	The Glen Campbell Goodtime Album (1970)

Singles from Norwood
- 1. "Everything a Man Could Ever Need" Released: June 1970

Norwood is the soundtrack album by American musician Glen Campbell from his 1970 film Norwood. The album was released by Capitol Records in June 1970.

== Track listing ==
Side 1:

1. "Ol' Norwood's Comin' Home" (Mitchell Torok, Ramona Redd) - 1:47 (vocal - Glen Campbell)
2. "Country Girl" (Al De Lory) - 2:52
3. "Marie" (Mitchell Torok, Ramona Redd) - 2:32 (vocal - Glen Campbell)
4. "The Brass Ensemble of Ralph. Texas" (Al De Lory) - 2:16
5. "The Repo Man" (Mac Davis) - 1:54 (vocal - Glen Campbell)
6. "Hot Wheels" (Al De Lory) - 2:45
7. "I'll Paint You a Song" (Mac Davis) - 4:05 (vocal - Glen Campbell)

Side 2:

1. "Norwood (Me and My Guitar)" (Mac Davis) - 2:35 (vocal - Glen Campbell)
2. "The Fring Thing" (Al De Lory) - 2:33
3. "Down Home" (Mac Davis) - 2:04 (vocal - Glen Campbell)
4. "Chicken Out (Joann's Theme)" (Al De Lory) - 1:48
5. "I'll Paint You a Song" (Reprise) (Mac Davis) - 2:07 (vocal- Glen Campbell)
6. "A Different Kind of Rock" (Al De Lory) - 2:30
7. "Everything a Man Could Ever Need" (Mac Davis) - 2:26 (vocal - Glen Campbell)

== Personnel ==
- Glen Campbell - vocals, acoustic guitar

== Production ==
- Executive producer - Al De Lory
- Producer - Neely Plumb/IMC Productions
- Arranged by Al De Lory, Gus Levene
- Recording Engineers - John Neal, Jack Manchen, Joe Polito
- Conductor - Al De Lory

== Charts ==
Album
Chart	Peak position
Billboard Country Albums	38
Billboard 200	90

Single
Everything a Man Could Ever Need
Chart	Peak position
US Hot Country Songs (Billboard)	5
US Billboard Hot 100	52
U.S. Billboard Easy Listening	3
Canadian RPM Country Tracks	1
Canadian RPM Top Singles	47
U.K. Singles Chart	32
