= All Coppers Are... =

1972 British crime drama film by Sidney Hayers

- Film Poster
- Directed by: Sidney Hayers
- Screenplay by: Allan Prior
- Produced by: George H. Brown
- Starring: Martin Potter; Julia Foster; Nicky Henson
- Cinematography: Arthur Ibbetson
- Edited by: Anthony Palk
- Music by: Eric Rogers
- Production company: Peter Rogers Productions
- Distributed by: Rank Film Distributors Limited (UK)
- Release date: June 1972 (UK)
- Running time: 87 minutes
- Country: United Kingdom
- Language: English

All Coppers Are... (also known as All Cops Are... and All Coppers are Bastards) is a 1972 British drama film directed by Sidney Hayers and starring Martin Potter, Julia Foster and Nicky Henson. The screenplay was by Allan Prior.

== Plot ==
A young London policeman and a small-time crook find themselves rivals in love. Joe, the policeman, is married with a young child, but when he meets Barry's live-in partner Sue, there is an instant mutual attraction. Joe forms part of a police line protecting an embassy from protesters and things get violent. Mounted police arrive and push the crowd back. Barry and a gang rob a warehouse and he is driving off with a lorry of stolen goods when Joe stops him – Barry shoots Joe with a shotgun and runs off.

== Cast ==
- Martin Potter as Joe
- Julia Foster as Sue
- Nicky Henson as Barry
- Wendy Allnutt as Peg
- Ian Hendry as Sonny Wade
- Sandra Dorne as Sue's mother
- Glynn Edwards as Jock
- Queenie Watts as Mrs. Malloy
- Carmel McSharry as Mrs. Briggs
- David Baxter as Fancy Boy
- Eddie Byrne as Malloy
- Norman Jones as Sgt. Wallis
- David Essex as Ronnie Briggs
- Robin Askwith as Simmy
- Tony Wright as Police Inspector
- Ellis Dale as Doctor
- Marianne Stone as woman in pub
- Michael Balfour as heart attack Victim

== Production ==
Peter Rodgers produced the Carry On series for the Rank Organisation and made an arrangement to produce other films for them "thrillers and romantic subjects".

The original title was All Coppers Are Bastards. Producer George H. Brown said "Our picture is 48 hours in a policeman's life – the mosaic of people and events with which he deals, climaxing in the kind of challenge any PC on the beat alone may have to face. And who better to write it than Allan Prior?" (Prior was a writer on the TV series Z Cars and Softly Softly.) It was Prior's first feature film. "It's marvellous to be able to explore a subject in depth," he said. "You can expand by location work."

"The majority of coppers are still working class lads," said Prior. "In this film we try to show that they are not of the class to have affairs but they might have a bit on the side."

The technical adviser on the film was ex-Detective Chief Superintendent Ray Dagg, who said "this seems to me to be the first film to really portray with authenticity what a policeman is like."

Martin Potter was then best known for appearing in Fellini's Satyricon (1969). The other male lead was played by Nicky Henson, who said of the film "you could almost describe it as a sort of 1971 Blue Lamp (1950) although some people may get the wrong idea."

Filming started in late May 1971. It was shot largely on location in Battersea, around Nine Elms and Clapham Junction, Southwest London, and at Pinewood Studios.

In October 1971 Peter Rogers wrote to an executive at Rank, "The police like this film themselves and I only hope that your enthusiasm filters down through the ranks of Rank – who are inclined to 'turn when father turns' – and then perhaps this film won't be - pissed against the wall as the others were."

== Critical reception ==
The Monthly Film Bulletin wrote: "Given Allan Prior's years of experience in writing for TV police series noted for their authenticity (Z Cars, Softly, Softly), it is hard to credit that he could have imbued this sluggish and aimless film with so little conviction. Not only does his script make no attempt to prove or disprove the statement of the title (the missing word is of course 'Bastards'), but it also provides no real identity for its P.C. hero. All it offers is an acutely contrived love triangle, totally lacking in humour, excitement or interest. And further anguish is caused by the fact that, from the top of the cast list (the immutably genteel Martin Potter) to the bottom (Tony Wright in a sadly inauspicious return to the screen), everyone is painfully miscast."

Leslie Halliwell said: "Pointlessly titled lowlife melodrama with no style whatsoever; any episode of Z Cars would be preferable." Filmink felt the movie "had a terrific idea – 48 hours in the life of a cop – but though there are some interesting bits, doesn’t live up to its premise, going off into detours."
