= Dave Randall (musician) =

British musician, writer, and political activist

Dave Randall is a British musician and writer. He is best known for his work as guitarist with Faithless and for his own band, Slovo. His playing credits include Sinéad O'Connor, Dido, Emiliana Torrini and 1 Giant Leap. He is author of the book Sound System – The Political Power of Music (Pluto Press 2017 & 2025). He lives in Bristol UK and lectures at BIMM University Bristol.

== Musical biography ==
Randall played guitar with Faithless from 1996 to 1999 and 2004–2011. He is also founder of the South London-based music collective Slovo, who have released three albums: nommo (2002), TodoCambia (2007), and Bread & Butterflies (2020). He also released a largely acoustic and instrumental solo album, Eight Stories, under the artist name Randall in 2004. Together with vocalist Mike Ladd, percussionist Dirk Rothbrust and clarinettist Carol Robinson, Randall founded the Paris-based experimental band Sleeping In Vilna. The band released the largely improvised album Why Waste Time in 2012.

He has also recorded and toured with Dido, Emiliana Torrini, 1 Giant Leap, Sinéad O'Connor and others. He currently performs with Roland Gift (Fine Young Cannibals) and is producing and performing live with half-Italian, South London based singer Barbarella.

Randall has composed music for stage and screen including scores for two feature-length documentary films: Rebuilding Hope (2009) and Witness Bahrain (2014).

== Political activism and writing ==
Randall has been associated with a number of leftwing campaigns and organisations. He was a member of the Socialist Workers Party (Britain) from 2004 until 2013 and has performed for the Stop The War Coalition, Love Music Hate Racism and the People's Assembly Against Austerity. He is also a patron of the Palestine Solidarity Campaign.

His book about music and politics, Sound System: The Political Power of Music, was published by Pluto Press in 2017 and he has subsequently given guest lectures on the subject at a number of universities and conferences in the UK, Ireland, USA, Canada and South Africa. A revised and updated second edition of Sound System: The Political Power of Music, was published by Pluto Press in 2025.

He has also written for The Guardian and is a regular contributor to the Brixton Blog and Counterfire.org.
