= Ricky Renée =

American and German actor and travesti performer (1929–2017)

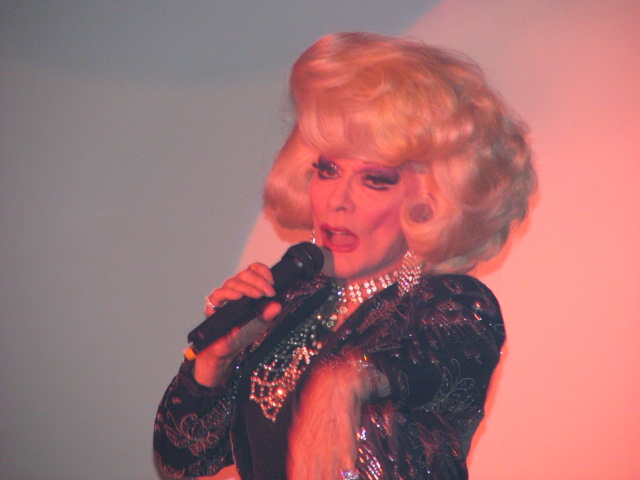
- Ricky Renée in 2006
- Born: Jack Gilbert Renner; 3 September 1929; Indianapolis, Indiana, U.S.
- Died: 29 October 2017 (aged 88); Nuremberg, Germany
- Occupation: Drag queen
- Employer(s): Jewel Box Revue, Le Carrousel de Paris, Chez Nous Cabaret

Jack Gilbert Renner (3 September 1929 – 29 October 2017), better known for his stage name Ricky Renée, was an American and German actor and travesti performer. He worked with the traveling Jewel Box Revue in the U.S. and at Le Carrousel in Paris and Chez Nous Cabaret in Berlin. Born in Indianapolis on 3 September 1929, he died in Nuremberg on 29 October 2017, at the age of 88.

== Filmography ==
Year	Title	Role	Notes
1961	World by Night	Himself	
1970	Goodbye Gemini	Myra	
1972	Cabaret	Fräulein Elke	
