= Clem Curtis =

Trinidadian-British singer (1940–2017)

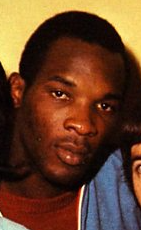
- Curtis in 1968

Background information
- Born: Curtis Clements; 28 November 1940; Trinidad, West Indies
- Died: 27 March 2017 (aged 76)
- Genres: Soul, R&B, pop
- Occupation: Musician
- Instrument: vocals
- Years active: 1966–2017
- Labels: Acid Jazz Records, EMI, Imperial, Pye Records, RCA Victor, Riverdale, United Artists
- Formerly of: the Ramong Sound, the Foundations, Clem Curtis & the Foundations, the Travelling Wrinklies

Clem Curtis (born Curtis Clements; 28 November 1940 – 27 March 2017) was a Trinidadian British singer, who was the original lead vocalist of 1960s soul group the Foundations.

== Background ==
=== Early life ===
Born in Trinidad as Curtis Clements, he arrived in England at the age of fifteen and later found employment as an interior decorator. He entered boxing and won most of his fights as a professional boxer. His mother was a popular singer in Trinidad and Curtis claims that this contributed to his ear for music.

As a teenager he experienced racism when he and two white friends were charged with theft. As it turned out, Curtis was the only one of the three that had a custodial sentence.

Curtis also took up wrestling and weightlifting for his hobbies.

=== Musical ===
Curtis later reformed a version of the Foundations. Over the years, Curtis fronted various line-ups of the Foundations, as well as appearing on his own as a solo artist. He recorded and released records on various record labels, including EMI, Opium, Pye Records, RCA Records, Riverdale, and others.

== Career ==
=== The Ramong Sound ===
Between 1966 and 1967 Curtis joined the Ramong Sound. He joined the group after hearing from his uncle that Ramong, Raymond Morrison, the lead singer of the group, was looking for backing singers. Curtis initially had very limited singing experience, only singing with his uncle when he came around the house with the guitar.

After the Ramong Sound lost their original lead singer, the band took on board Arthur Brown temporarily, and went through a few name changes before they became the Foundations Arthur Brown stated in an interview that in his time with the group, he enjoyed singing with Curtis. They both sang separately as well as doing some duets.

Decades later, Arthur Brown had a recollection of when he walked into the Westbourne Grove bar for an audition, he saw Curtis holding a spear to the throat of the drummer who was bent backwards over the bar.

At some stage, Rod Stewart had sat in with the band for a night but he had other plans.

During the time of the band's evolving from the Ramong Sound to the Foundations, Curtis was tied up by a protection racket gang with someone holding a knife to his throat. As a result, they had to move out with all their belongings to the derelict Mini Cab office above the old premises. This is where they were discovered by Ron Fairway.

=== The Foundations ===
1960s

The group emerged in early 1967 with Curtis as their lead singer. The Foundations would go on to have worldwide hits with "Baby Now That I've Found You" and "Build Me Up Buttercup". Curtis is the lead voice on their hits "Baby Now That I've Found You", "Back on My Feet Again", and "Any Old Time (You're Lonely and Sad)".

Curtis was the guest reviewer for the Blind Date Section of the October 28, 1967 issue of Melody Maker. He reviewed singles by Stevie Wonder, The Kinks, John Walker, Lee Dorsey, Madeline Hell, Chris Barber's Band, Brian Auger and the Trinity, Arthur Conley, The Creation, Mille Small and Astrud Gilberto.

An article "Foundations find a few problems in the States" by Bob Dawbarn in the 29 June 1968 issue of Melody Maker told of incident in the United States where Curtis lost his temper with a policeman. Curtis and Peter MacBeth were driving through San Francisco to Los Angeles. They were stopped by the police. The policeman took MacBeth's license and went around the back of the car possibly to check the number plate. Curtis turned around to look and the policeman started shouting at him "Have you got anything to say" and told him to sit down. Curtis lost his temper telling him, "You may talk to your American spades like that but I'm British". He also said "Don't you dare speak to me like that", and he would have his badge off of him as well. Apparently the policeman looked amazed.

After having found success with The Foundations, two hit singles and releasing two albums, some problems started with their songwriter producer Tony Macaulay as well within the group. Curtis felt that after their hit a couple of The Foundations members were taking things a little too easy thinking that they did not need to work so hard now that they had scored a hit. After being disillusioned with the band, he along with another member, Mike Elliott, left The Foundations in 1968 just after recording a version of "It's All Right", a song that they had been playing live for some time. He stuck around long enough to help the band audition a replacement. One of the singers auditioning was Warren Davis of the Warren Davis Monday Band. His replacement turned out to be Joey Young (Colin Young).

In 1969, a self-titled album, The Foundations was released on the Marble Arch label (cat MALS 1157). It was among the selection of lower priced records listed in the 18 October 1969 issue of New Musical Express. It featured stereo re-recordings of songs previously recorded by The Foundations. The songs "Any Old Time (You're Lonely and Sad)", "Back on My Feet Again", "Harlem Shuffle", "Tomorrow" and "We Are Happy People" had appeared on the Rocking the Foundations album released the previous year. "Baby Now That I've Found You" with Colin Young on vocals from the Marble Arch LP has the same backing track as the original version by Clem Curtis. The new version of "Tomorrow" when referred to years later, gets referred to as the alternate version. This version has Colin Young on vocals instead of Clem Curtis' vocals which appeared on the live version. They too have the same backing track. However, the Colin Young re-recording is a longer edit. "Tomorrow" was originally on the Rocking the Foundations album which was a mixture of actual live and studio tracks. It's likely that there were some recordings with Clem Curtis on lead vocals in existence, but his vocals were replaced with those by Colin Young.

1970s

==== Clem Curtis & the Foundations ====
During the 1970s, the group was called Clem Curtis & the Foundations but sometimes used the Foundations name. Curtis and his Foundations toured Australia in 1975. Unfortunately, the tour was marred with a trumped up assault charge which resulted in Curtis being taken off of a Jet by the New South Wales police, put into handcuffs and put into a police cell.

In 1977, Clem Curtis and the Foundations nearly got into the Eurovision final with "Where Were You When I Needed Your Love", a John Macleod and Dave Meyers composition. They came third in the heats, and were picked as a favourite to win, but an electricians' strike ruined their chances, and "Rock Bottom" by Lynsey de Paul and Mike Moran was the winner.

==== Reconnection with another Foundations member ====
Curtis and Alan Warner worked on a project to re-cut the original Foundations hits. The result was the Greatest Hits CD album that was released on Double Play GRF176 in or around 1994. The recordings were produced and arranged by Keith Bateman and in addition to Warner on guitar and Curtis on lead vocals, the recordings featured Andy Bennett on Drums and Vince Cross on keyboards.

== Solo career and other ventures ==
1960s

Curtis went on to pursue a solo career in the United States. This was probably helped along by the encouragement of his friend Sammy Davis Jr.

=== Debut single ===
According to the October 12, 1968 issue of Melody Maker, Curtis' first solo disc was to be "Just for Tonight" which was a Tony Macaulay composition. He was also rehearsing his backing group in preparation for some one-nighters in about a fortnight time. It appears that Tony Macaulay had David Essex record it instead. It was announced in the 7 December 1968 issue of Melody Maker that Curtis' debut single would be the Tony Macaulay composition, "Marie Take a Chance and it would be released by United Artists on 9 January. In 1969, he was signed to Cowsills Productions and had debuted with "Marie Take a Chance". The Tony Macaulay and John Macleod composition was arranged by Des Champ. The single was reviewed by Stu Ginsburg in the 31 January issue of GO YMCA. Making note of the fact that this was Curtis' first release since leaving The Foundations, Ginsberg said that the song was "rhythmically lyrical, and could be his first big one". The single was reviewed in the January 18, 1969 issue of New Musical Express. Reviewer Derek Johnson said that it was "a busy, bouncy extremely exhilarating number" and that it sounded that Clem was back with his former group. He said that he wasn't sure if the song was strong enough. The single was reviewed in the 19 April issue of Record World. One of the magazine's four-star picks, the reviewer said, "it rocks for real". A "newcomer pick", it was also reviewed by Cash Box that week. The reviewer noted the teen appeal and said that it had hefty rhythm appeal, and it carried a fine vocal. There was also breakout potential. As shown by Record World in the 26 April issue, the single was getting played on US radio stations, KIMN, WAKY and KCPX.

1970s

After some well-received club appearances and hanging out with artists such as Wilson Pickett, and staying with the Cowsills, he did not receive enough work and decided to return to England in the early 1970s. He did some work with Donnie Elbert and Johnny Johnson and the Bandwagon.

Working with producer John Macleod in 1971, Curtis recorded the Macleod / Mike Redway composition, "Mountain Over the Hill" which was released on Pye 7N 45070.

Working again with producer John Macleod, Curtis recorded "I've Never Found a Girl (To Love Me Like You Do)". Backed with "Point of No Return", it was released on Pye 45150 in 1972. "Point of No Return" had earlier been recorded by Pickettywitch and was the B side of their single, " Number Wonderful" (cat# Pye 7N.45126) which was produced by Mcleod. Curtis' single was reviewed by Peter Jones in the June 24, 1972 issue of Record Mirror. Jones said that it had a good off-beat that would lead to hand clapping and foot stomping. He couldn't elaborate on the lazy feeling of the song but said that it was a good production and that Clem had the feel and that it was a chart chance. It was also reviewed by Melody Maker. The reviewer said that it was a nice record that could do well in discos and there was a chart possibility.

He recorded "I Don't Care What People Say" bw "Shame on You" which was released on EMI EMI 2159 in May 1974. Both sides were composed by Biddu and Lee Vanderbilt. It was reviewed by Peter Jones in the May 25 issue of Record Mirror. Jones said that the Biddu production was good and noted the gently building performance but said that it was a hard one to assess and that it wasn't a strong enough song, almost but not quite.

In 1979, he recorded his version of "Unchained Melody" which was released in both 7" format (RCA PB 5175) and 12" format (RCA PC 5175). It was to be available from July 16. James Hamilton said that Curtis proved that he'd been a soul singer all along when "he really wailed while singing it at Mayfair’s Gullivers. His disco version of the song spent three weeks in the Record Mirror UK Disco Chart, peaking at no. 75.

1980s

Curtis had a part as a member of the congregation in the Anton Philips production of the James Baldwin play, The Amen Corner which ran in March 1987 at the Lyric Theater in London.

In the late 1980s, Curtis joined the line-up of the Corporation, also referred to as "the Traveling Wrinklies", which was a parody of sorts of the popular Traveling Wilburys. The Traveling Wrinklies were composed of Curtis, Mike Pender, Brian Poole, Tony Crane, and Reg Presley, former lead singer of the Troggs. They released the single "Ain't Nothing But a House Party" on the Corporation label in 1988.

1990s - 2000s

Curtis appeared on stage as the Lion in The Wiz at the Lyric Hammersmith. His performance was singled out by a critic for The Guardian who said it was "fiercely comic and touching". He has also appeared on TV chat shows, the British reality television series Airport, and had a bit part in the ITV series The Bill.

In 2004, Curtis toured the UK as part of a soul package tour with Jimmy James & The Vagabonds. At the end of a show he was invited back on stage by Jimmy James who said "I don't like him and he don't like me but that's all right. Here's Clem Curtis." They then did "Love Train" together.

Curtis collaborated with Lord Large and recorded the single, "Stuck in a Wind Up" bw "Move Over Daddy". Credited to Lord Large featuring Clem Curtis, it was originally released on 2 Bit 2BIT45-1, a label created for the release. It received play attention on Radio 2. The Acid Jazz label then released it on AJX174S in 2005. They also offered to release an album with Clem Curtis and other artists. The album, The Lord's First XI also featured recordings by Dean Parrish, Robert Bradley, Glenn Tilbrook, Andrea Britton, Ashley Slater, Linda Lewis, and Roy Phillips. It had good reviews from Mojo, Record Collector, The Huddersfield Daily Examiner, The Sunday Mercury, and others. Jason Draper of Record Collector referred to "Stuck in a Wind Up" as "a slice of breezy, upbeat soul so authentic you’d swear it was recorded in the late 60s", while Mojo called it "the perfect norther-soul floor filler.

In 2010, producer Ian Levine had Curtis record the song, "Dial My Number". It was included on the Northern Soul 2010 album.

With Newham Mag referring to Curtis as the Godfather of English Soul, Clem Curtis & the Foundations along with Hot Chocolate were appearing at the Under The Stars Festival on Saturday night, 15 August 2015.

Curtis recorded and performed until near the end of his life; he was regularly seen as part of the "soul explosion" night with former Flirtations singer Earnestine Pearce and Jimmy James at resorts such as Butlins and Warner Leisure Hotels in the United Kingdom. He also appeared on cruises such as the cruise ship "Azura", which docked in Southampton.

Outside of music Curtis had established a side occupation for himself, dealing in antiques.

== Personal life and death ==
Long time resident of Olney, Buckinghamshire, he was the father of seven children, six sons and a daughter from previous relationships. Curtis died on 27 March 2017 at the age of 76, after a short battle with cancer.

Curtis has been referred to on various occasions, informally, as "The Godfather of English Soul".

His brother is Hot Chocolate percussionist and backing singer Derek Lewis. Lewis was also a member of Clem Curtis & the Foundations.

== Discography ==
=== With the Corporation ===
==== 7" single ====
- "Ain't Nothin' But a House Party" / "Ain't Nothing But a House Party" (1988)

==== 12" single ====
- "Ain't Nothing But a House Party" (1988)

=== Solo ===
==== 7" vinyl recordings ====
Title	Year	Act	Label	catalogue #
"Marie Take a Chance" / "Caravan"	1969	Clem Curtis	United Artists	UP 2263
"Mountain Over the Hill" / "Time Alone Will Tell"	1971	Clem Curtis	Pye Records	7N 45070
"I've Never Found a Girl (To Love Me Like You Do)" / "Point of No Return"	1972	Clem Curtis	Pye Records	7N 45149
"I Don't Care What People Say" / "Shame on You"	1974	Clem Curtis	EMI	EMI 2159
"Make a Wish" / "Amanda"	1976	Clem Curtis & the Foundations Ltd.	Riverdale	RR 100
"Sweet Happiness" / "Lady Luck"	1976	Clem Curtis & the Foundations	Riverdale	RR 105
"Unchained Melody" / "Need Your Love"	1978	Clem Curtis	RCA	PB 5175
"Broadway" / "Broadway (instrumental)"	1984	Clem Curtis & the Foundations	IDM	IDM 69
"Baby Now That I've Found You" / "Baby Now That I've Found You (Instrumental)"	1987	Clem Curtis & the Foundations	Opium	OPIN 001
"Stuck in a Wind Up" / "Move Over Daddy"	2005	Lord Large featuring Clem Curtis	2 Bit	2BIT45 - 1
"Stuck in a Wind Up" / "Move Over Daddy"	2005	Lord Large featuring Clem Curtis	Acid Jazz	AJX 174 S

==== 12" vinyl recordings ====
Title	Year	Act	Label	Catalogue #
"Unchained Melody, Need Your Love" / "Need Your Love"	1979	Clem Curtis	RCA Victor	PC 5175
"Dancing in the Street" / "Scottish Beat Party"	1983	Clem Curtis	Pressure	DD 1006
"Baby Now That I've Found You" (Extended Version) / "Baby Now That I've Found You" (7" Version), "Baby Now That I've Found You" (Busk Mix)	1987	Clem Curtis & the Foundations	Opium Records	OPINT 001
"Promise" (The Saxual Mix), "Promise" (The Funky Trip) / "Promise" (Jon's in the Garage), "Promise" (Original Honesty Mix), "Promise" (Drummie Zeb Dubbed Up Mix)	1992	The Promise featuring Clem Curtis	Hard Discs	HARD T 3
