= Stuck in a Wind Up =

Single by Clem Curtis and Lord Large

"Stuck In A Wind Up"

Single by Lord Large featuring Clem Curtis

from the album The Lord's First XI
- B-side: "Move Over Daddy"
- Released: 2005
- Genre: Northern soul
- Label: Acid Jazz AJX174S
- Composer: Lord Large
- Producer: A. Jones

Lord Large featuring Clem Curtis singles chronology
"Don't Stick Around Too Long"	"Stuck In A Wind Up"

"Stuck in a Wind Up" is a song released by Lord Large on the Acid Jazz label with former Foundations front man Clem Curtis on lead vocals. The B-side is a ska track called "Move Over Daddy". "Stuck in a Wind Up is popular with the Northern soul scene.

== Background ==
The song was written by Lord Large. The recording came about as a result of a bass playing friend of his, Steve Walters mentioning that Foundations singer Clem Curtis was his unofficial godfather. Curtis's status in British 1960s soul and "Baby, Now That I've Found You" being one of the top ten favorites of Large and his drummer / producer friend Jones, had a part in it. Curtis liked it enough to come down from his home near Milton Keynes to East London to record it. The song was first released on 2Bit, a label created by Large and Jones. The release got airplay on Radio 2 with the act credited as "Lord Large featuring Clem Curtis". Acid Jazz picked it up with an offer to put an album out with Curtis and recordings by other potentially classic singers. The song backed with "Move Over Daddy" would be released on Acid Jazz AJX 174 S in 2005.

In a review of Lord Large's The Lord's First XI album, Record Collector referred to the song as a slice of breezy, upbeat soul so authentic that it sounded like it was recorded in the late 1960s. It was also one of the three songs referred to by Mojo as the highlights of the album. Mojo also said that it was the perfect Northern Soul dance floor filler.

In addition to its inclusion on The Lord's First XI, the song appears on the various artists compilation albums, Hammond Street, Vol. 3, released on Acid Jazz AJXCD 195 in 2008 Dig the New Breed: Singles From the New Millennium album, released on Acid Jazz 233 in 2010, and Modern Northern Soul on Acid Jazz AJXCD 376 in 2015.

== Commercial reception ==
The song was at no. 30 on onetruekev's 50 at 50 – Northern Soul Songs list in 2020. Some three years after Curtis' death,

== Discography (selective) ==
Single releases
Title	Catalogue	Year	Notes #
"Stuck in a Wind Up" / "Move Over Daddy"	2 Bit 2BIT45 - 1		
"Stuck in a Wind Up" / "Move Over Daddy"	Acid Jazz AJX 174 S	2005	
