= Quantum Jump =

British band (1973–1979)

- Origin: England
- Genres: Jazz fusion; funk; jazz rock
- Years active: 1973–1979
- Past members: Rupert Hine; Mark Warner; John G. Perry; Trevor Morais

Quantum Jump were a 1970s British band, consisting of singer and keyboard player Rupert Hine, guitarist Mark Warner, bass player John G. Perry (then of Caravan), and drummer Trevor Morais (who had previously played in The Peddlers). The band is best remembered for its 1979 UK hit single "The Lone Ranger".

== Career ==
Quantum Jump were formed in 1973 at Farmyard rehearsal studios by Trevor Morais and Jeffrey Levinson. The idea for the name came from a conversation Rupert Hine had with Anthony Stern, an ex-Cambridge University friend and filmmaker. "He had told me about the relatively recent discovery at Cambridge of the manner in which an electron's energy increases and decreases, not linearly as had been long assumed, but in a discrete step, known as a "quantum". The term "quantum jump" (later to be commonly referred to as "quantum leap") was coined by the Cambridge team. I preferred "jump", as it had more of a "soul / funk" music connotation".

Quantum Jump's sound was a hybrid of fusion, funk, and jazz rock. The first album was written and arranged in 1973–1974, and recorded (with equipment hired from AIR London) at Farmyard. Hine produced the sessions, with Steve Nye as sound engineer. The sessions were independently financed by Jeffrey Levinson (of Mountain Fjord) but, explained Hine, after some 18 months of managerial and contractual problems, the rights to the album were sold to The Electric Record Company in 1975. The label's MD, Jeremy Thomas, believed that the song "The Lone Ranger" was a potential hit single if only it had something more "interesting" for the intro.

Hine picked up on his remark and sang the longest word in the world (listed in The Guinness Book of Records) a capella, replacing the original intro to the song altogether. The word in question, taken from the language of the Maori, New Zealand's indigenous people, was the name of the hill Taumatawhakatangihangakoauauotamateaturipukakapikimaungahoronukupokaiwhenuakitanatahu in Hawke's Bay, New Zealand. On the record, the word (made to sound as if it were Native American, in keeping with the Lone Ranger and Tonto theme) is chanted as follows:

Taumata-whaka-tangi-hanga-kuayuwo
tamate-aturi-pukaku-piki-maunga
horonuku-pokaiawhen-uaka-tana-tahu
mataku-atanganu-akawa-miki-tora

"The Lone Ranger" was first released in 1976. After it was chosen as Tony Blackburn's BBC Radio 1 "Record of the Week" (the nationwide morning radio show with the highest ratings in the UK at the time), it was banned when some fragments of lyrics were deemed to contain references to drugs and homosexuality. The BBC stopped playing the record, and it failed to chart. Disillusionment with the length of time it had taken to get the original record deal, and the lack of any really cohesive management, led to guitarist Mark Warner's decision to leave and join Cat Stevens' live band.

Quantum Jump soldiered on for a second album, recorded in late 1976 as a trio with the help of various musician friends, most notably Caravan multi-instrumentalist Geoffrey Richardson. Barracuda was released in April 1977, coinciding with the band going out on the road for a couple of UK tours with Roye Albrighton (of Nektar) on guitar. The album had been expensive to record, and when it did not sell well enough, Quantum Jump disbanded at the end of 1977.

The band would, however, make an unexpected return two years later when a re-release of "The Lone Ranger" single became an unexpected hit. The song had been widely played by Kenny Everett on both his radio and TV shows. Re-released in 1979, it eventually reached number 5 in the UK Singles Chart and number 67 in Australia. The band (including Mark Warner) reconvened for an appearance on Top of the Pops. A third Quantum Jump album was released to coincide with this unexpected "smash" single. Titled Mixing, it was essentially a collection of the best tracks from the first two albums, albeit heavily reworked and remixed.

Hine went on to become the producer of more than 100 albums for artists as varied as Tina Turner, Bob Geldof, Chris de Burgh, the Thompson Twins, Stevie Nicks, Rush, the Waterboys, Suzanne Vega, Duncan Sheik, the Fixx and Howard Jones. He would also appear to form another band in the mid-1980s, called Thinkman, but this was simply another name for his solo recordings. In addition, there is the Soundtrack album Better Off Dead on A&M Records, featuring Rupert Hine, Cy Curnin (the Fixx), Martin Ansell, Terri Nunn, Thinkman, and E. G. Daily. The production is centred on Hine, and this is the first appearance of Thinkman.

== Discography ==
=== Albums ===
- Quantum Jump (1976)
- Barracuda (1977)
- Mixing (remix collection, 1979)

=== Singles ===
Year	Title	UK
1976	"The Lone Ranger"	5 (1979)
1976	"No American Starship"	—
1977	"(Oh My Lord) Don't Look Now"	—
"—" denotes releases that did not chart.
