= Martin Potter (actor) =

British actor (born 1944)

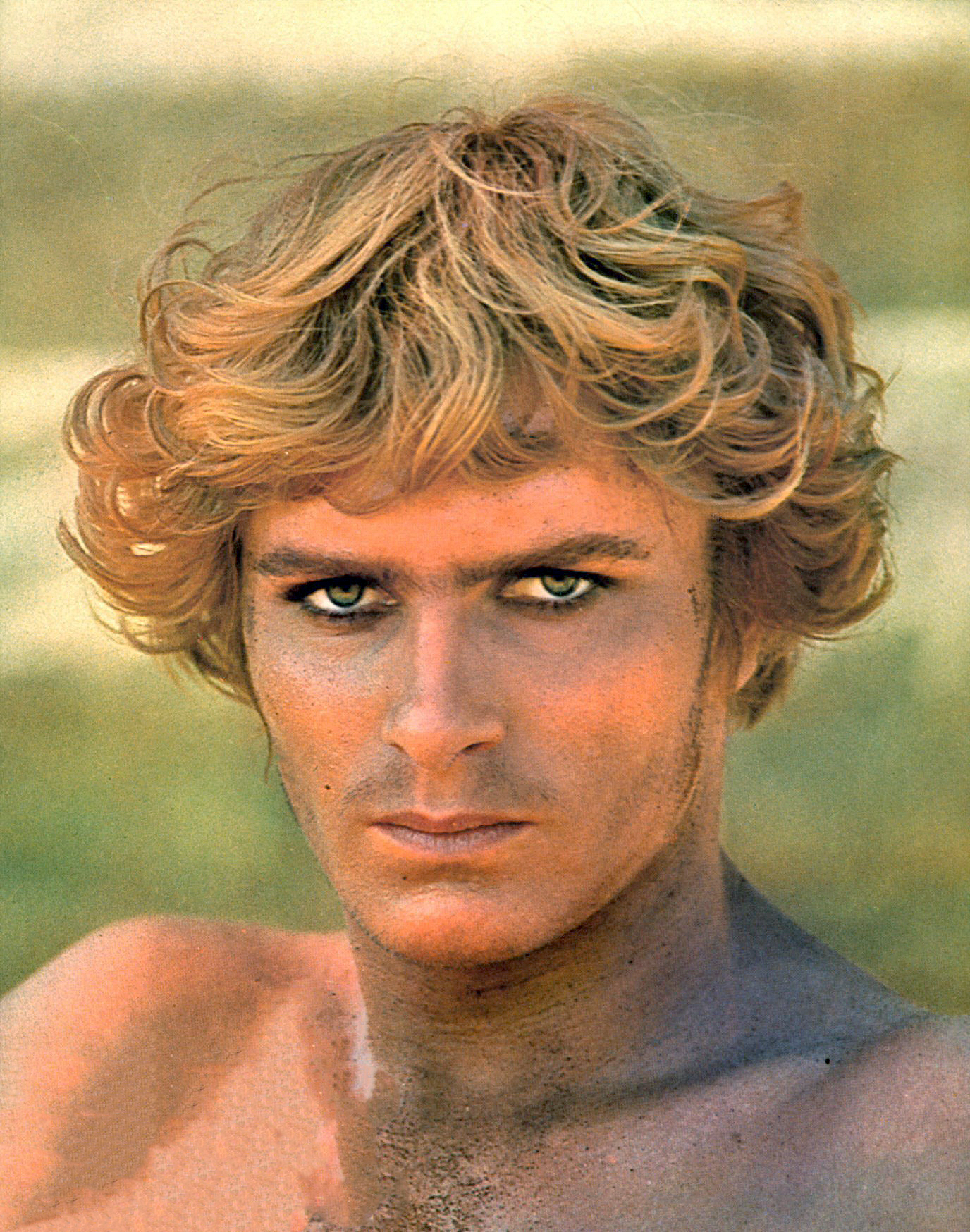
- Potter in Fellini Satyricon (1969)
- Born: 4 October 1944 (age 81); Nottingham, England
- Occupation: Actor
- Years active: 1968–1988; 2006

Martin Potter (born 4 October 1944) is a British actor.

After the National Youth Theatre and repertory theatre in Guildford and Hampstead, Potter received his first role in British television at the age of 23 in the television drama The Bonegrinder (1968) written by Dennis Potter. In the same year he had another small part alongside Brian Cox in the futuristic drama The Year of the Sex Olympics.

One year later Potter's career took off with a much larger role. The Italian director Federico Fellini chose him for the main role of Encolpius in his film Satyricon (1969). Terence Stamp, Fellini's original choice for the main role, was not available, and Fellini was looking for someone of a similar appearance.

After this star role, Potter's career tended back to smaller roles again: mostly B-films and television productions like the film adaptation of W. Somerset Maugham's Olive. Among his larger and more well-known parts are the psychological horror Goodbye Gemini (1970) opposite Judy Geeson, the history film Nicholas and Alexandra (1971), and the mystery remake of The Big Sleep (1978) (with Robert Mitchum as private detective Philip Marlowe). He also appeared in horror films, including Craze with Jack Palance, and television series such as Doctor Who. In 1975 he achieved some popularity with the title part of Robin Hood in a TV mini-series The Legend of Robin Hood. In 1985 he again took a part in a production concerning Ancient Rome: the American mini-series A.D. in which he portrayed the Roman politician and opponent of Nero, Gaius Calpurnius Piso.

== Filmography ==
Year	Title	Role	Notes
1968	Theatre 625	Kin Hodder	Episode: "The Year of the Sex Olympics"
1969	Fellini Satyricon	Encolpio	
1970	Goodbye Gemini	Julian Dewar	
1970	The Only Way	Morten Jensen	
1971	Nicholas and Alexandra	Prince Felix Yusupov	
1972	All Coppers Are...	Joe	
1974	Craze	Ronnie	
1975	The Legend of Robin Hood	Robin Hood	6 episodes
1976	Satan's Slave	Stephen Yorke	
1977	Cruel Passion	Lord Carlisle	
1978	The Big Sleep	Owen Taylor	
1979	Lady Oscar	Count Florian de Girodelle	
1981	The Borgias	Paolo Orsini	6 episodes
1985	A.D.	Gaius Calpurnius Piso	5 episodes
1986	Gunpowder	Powder	
