= Roy Phillips =

British musician (1941–2025)

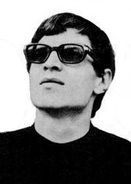
- Phillips in 1968

Background information
- Born: Roy Godfrey Phillips; 5 May 1941; Poole, Dorset, England
- Died: 24 April 2025 (aged 83) Christchurch, New Zealand
- Occupation: Musician
- Instruments: Keyboards, guitar
- Years active: 1957–2025
- Website: royphillips.org

Roy Godfrey Phillips (5 May 1941 – 24 April 2025) was a British musician. He was a member of The Soundtracks (a backing group of The Dowlands), The Saints and The Peddlers.

== Background ==
Phillips was known as the voice and keyboard sound of well-known popular trio, The Peddlers which was formed in Manchester in 1964.

In later years, Phillips was so taken with New Zealand, he decided to move there in 1981. After rejecting living in Auckland, Philips moved to Paihia, where he ran a café for eight years, before moving to Queenstown. From 2002, he lived in Christchurch, after moving there to marry his wife, Robyn.

== Career ==
=== 1960s ===
During the 1960s, Phillips was a member of The Song Peddlers which with addition of Trevor Morais became a trio. The lineup also included Tab Martin. The group were managed by Alan Lewis. A single "Rose Marie" bw "I'm Not Afraid" was released on the Philips label in 1964. The group then became The Peddlers. Also in 1964, and now known as The Peddlers they had some minor success with their debut single, "Let The Sun Shine In" which was written by Teddy Randazzo.

Phillips was one of the musicians placed in the 1967 Beat Instrumental Gold Star Awards. He shared the no. 12 spot with Keith Emerson in the Keyboard Player category. Also in the same awards, The Peddlers were placed at no. 18 in the Best Group on Stage category.

The group would go on to have hits with "Birth" and "Girlie".

=== 1970s ===
In 1976, his group, Peddlers which he had led since 1964 broke up. In the same year, Phillips's solo album Mr Peddler was released on Warner Bros. It also had a limited release as a private pressing on the Wild Cherry label as Heavy on the Light Side. The Wild Cherry release differed slightly from the Warner Bros. one. Also that year he had a single "My Spanish Sun" bw "The Office Party" out on the Sol-Doon label.

=== 1980s to 1990s ===
In 1983, Phillips had a single released on the Warrior label which included releases by artists the Mike McGregor Band, Mantra and Herbs. The single was "New Zealand, New Zealand" bw "Takapuna". In 1987, his single "Step By Step" bw "All Girl Planet" was released on Zulu Z006. Also in the late 1980s, Phillips headed the Sunday bill at the Sixth Southern Comfort Jazz and Blues Festival that was held in New Zealand over Queen's Birthday Weekend.

=== 2000s ===
In 2006, he appeared on the television show Close Up, interviewed by John Sellwood.

In 2007, a song by Phillips, "Closer" was featured on a Lord Large album, The Lord's First XI. The album also featured recordings by Glenn Tilbrook, Clem Curtis, Dean Parrish and Linda Lewis. Phillip's involvement in the project came about as a result of Large's friend, producer/drummer Jones who was honeymooning in New Zealand and had found a new drinking buddy who happened to be Phillips. Phillips' vocals were recorded at Midnight Studios in Christchurch, New Zealand.

In 2006, he recorded his album, That's Way 'Tis, which was tribute to his late father, Frankie Phillips.

His album called Blue Groove (2014) was produced and recorded at Roy's "Groove Room" Studios which he set up at his home in Christchurch after moving there in 2002.

In August 2017, he appeared at Peppers Beachfront restaurant in Gisborne.

== Death ==
Phillips died in Christchurch, New Zealand on 24 April 2025, at the age of 83.

== Discography (selective) ==
Singles
Title	Catalogue	Year	Notes #
"Spanish Sun" / "The Office Party"	Sol-Doon SDR 014	1976	
"New Zealand, New Zealand" / "Takapuna"	Warrior WAR 1009	1983	
"Step By Step" / "A Girl Planet"	Zulu Records Z 006	1987	

Albums
Title	Catalogue	Year	Notes #
Mr. Peddler	Warner Bros. Records Z 26001	1976	New Zealand release
Heavy On The Light Side	Wild Cherry WCHLS 26776	1977	Private press release of Mr Peddler
That's Way 'Tis	Beyond Sound	2006	
Blue Groove		2014	
Standard Procedure 1		2019	

Appears on
Act	Album title	Catalogue	Year	Song	Notes #
Lord Large	The Lord's First XI	Acid Jazz Records AJXLP182			
