= The Peddlers =

British jazz/soul band

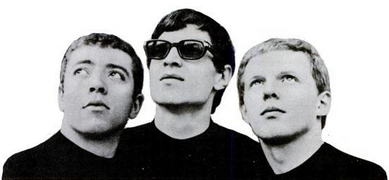
- The Peddlers in 1968. L–R: Trevor Morais, Roy Phillips and Tab Martin.

Background information
- Also known as: The Peddlars
- Origin: UK
- Genres: Jazz, pop, jazz rock, soul jazz
- Years active: 1960s to 1970s
- Labels: Philips, CBS, EMI
- Past members: Roy Phillips; Tab Martin; Trevor Morais; Paul Johnson; Jules Smith; John Garland
- Website: http://www.thepeddlers.co.uk/

The Peddlers were a British jazz/soul trio of the 1960s and 1970s. Led by organist Roy Phillips, they had hits with "Birth" and "Girlie". They were very popular in New Zealand during the 1970s.

== History ==
The Peddlers formed in Manchester in April 1964, as a trio consisting of:

- Trevor Morais (born 10 October 1944, Liverpool) – The drummer had previously played with Faron's Flamingos and Rory Storm and the Hurricanes (who had struggled to replace Ringo Starr after he had left to join the Beatles).
- Tab Martin (born Alan Brearey; 24 December 1944, Newcastle upon Tyne) – The bassist, noted for his peculiar style of playing a Gibson EB-2 bass guitar in an upright position as though it were a string bass.
- Roy Phillips (5 May 1941, Parkstone, Poole, Dorset), on vocals and keyboards, had been in the Saints, the Tornados, and the Soundtracks.

== Career ==
=== 1960s ===
The group's history began as the Song Peddlers, which with addition of Trevor Morais, became a trio. The lineup also included Tab Martin and Roy Phillips. The Song Peddlers were managed by Alan Lewis. The singles "Rose Marie" and "I'm Not Afraid" was released on the Philips label in 1964. The group then changed its name to the Peddlers. Also in 1964, and now known as the Peddlers they had some minor success with their debut single, "Let the Sun Shine In" which was written by Teddy Randazzo.

In 1966, the group began a residency at Annies Room, and also played at The Scotch of St James and The Pickwick, where they recorded the group's first album Live at the Pickwick with an introduction by Pete Murray.

The trio released six singles and an EP on the Philips record label before joining CBS in 1967. Their cover of "Let the Sun Shine In" (1964) was listed on the UK Singles Chart.

In 1967, they recorded their version of "What'll I Do" backed with "Delicious Lady", which was set for release on March 31. Venues where they were to promote the single included Swingalong on March 24, Saturday Club on March 25, Dee Time on April 6, Pop North on April 7 and The Joe Loss Show on April 21. In April they were embarking on a tour with Nina Simone and Dick Gregory beginning on April 14. In May the Peddlers were heading to the United States for a six-week engagement at the Flamingo Club in Las Vegas and then for two weeks in Miami, Florida.

With their version of Bobby Darin's "You're the Reason I'm Living" out in November, the 21 October 1967 issue of Disc and Music Echo had the group down to appear on the Jimmy Young Show on Radio 1 on 5 November, Engelbert Humperdinck Show on 17 November, Saturday Club, 18 November and International Cabaret on 22 November.

In 1968 they released the album Freewheelers, consisting of standards arranged by Keith Mansfield. In September that year, it was reported by Disc and Music Echo that the group had been signed by film producer, Carlo Ponti to write four songs for his new film. They had also released a new single, "Comin' Home Baby" which did well for Mel Torme. It was due for release on 4 October. A week later on the 11th, their new album was due for release. This follow-up, Three in a Cell, included a version of "On a Clear Day You Can See Forever", from the 1965 musical of the same name, which was later sampled for its bass and Hammond organ riff.

In 1969, their single "That's Life" was released. It was reported by Record Mirror in the March 22 issue that the group were trying to find two dancing girls to join their act for the promotion of their release.

The third and final CBS album, Birthday, followed in 1969, and brought the band two UK Top 40 singles in "Girlie", and "Birth" which reached No. 17.

=== 1970s ===
The single "Girlie" did well in New Zealand, hitting the no. 1 spot in May 1970. Following Birthday, the Peddlers returned to Philips, where they released Georgia on My Mind in 1971 and Suite London (1972). Also that year, they released "Honey Come Back". It was a hit in New Zealand peaking on week two at no. 8 in The Listener chart in July.

On Philips they released Three for All in 1970 including "Tell the World We're Not In", "Working Again", "My Funny Valentine", and "Love for Sale". "Tell the World We're Not In" got on to the Listener chart. Spending three weeks in the chart, it peaked at no. 18.

Trevor Morais left the trio during an Australian tour in 1972, and was replaced on drums by New Zealander Paul Johnston. The Peddlers disbanded in 1976. The anthology How Cool Is Cool... The Complete CBS Recordings was released by CBS in 2002.

Electronic record producer Luke Vibert sampled their "Impressions (Part 3)" for "The Premise", a track which featured on his album, Musipal.

== After the Peddlers ==
Trevor Morais joined Quantum Jump. He later opened the El Cortijo studio in Málaga, Spain, and has worked with David Essex, Howard Jones, Elkie Brooks, and Björk.

Tab Martin lives in Portugal.

Roy Phillips lived in Christchurch, New Zealand starting in 1981, and performed live shows around the country. He contributed lead vocals for the track "Closer" on the 2007 Lord Large album, The Lord's First XI. Phillips died in Christchurch on 24 April 2025, at the age of 83.

Paul Johnston returned to New Zealand and became a chiropractor. He died in 2013.

A Peddlers reunion gig was held on 25 May 2009 in Auckland, New Zealand.

== In popular culture ==
- The Peddlers provided the theme song for the 1968 Hammer film The Lost Continent.
- The Peddlers song "Tell The World We're Not In" is featured in the 1970 horror film Goodbye Gemini.
- The Peddlers song "On a Clear Day You Can See Forever" is featured in the Breaking Bad episode "Hazard Pay" as part of a montage of Walter White and Jesse Pinkman producing methamphetamine.

== Discography ==
=== Albums ===
AlbumsUK releases unless indicated otherwise
Title	Catalogue	Year	UK	Notes #
Live at the Pickwick!	Philips SBL 7768	1967	—	
Freewheelers	CBS SBPG 63183	1967	27	
Three in a Cell	CBS S 63411	1968	—	
Birthday	CBS S 63682	1969	16	
Three for All	Philips 6308 028	1970	—	
Georgia on My Mind	Philips 6382066	1971	—	Re-issue of Live at the Pickwick!
Suite London	Philips 6308 102	1972	—	with the London Philharmonic Orchestra
Live Concertgebouw Amsterdam 1972		1972	—	Bootleg
'Live' in London	EMI EMC 3022	1974	—	
Live in Amsterdam	Gemini GEM10	1979	—	New Zealand release
"—" denotes releases that did not chart or were not released in that territory.

Compilation albums
Title	Catalogue	Year	Notes #
The Fantastic Peddlers	Fontana SFL13016	1968	
The Peddlers on Tour	Embassy EMB 30003(L)	1976	
The Peddlers: Live at the Pickwick / Three for All	See For Miles SEECD673	1998	2 CD
How Cool Is Cool (The Complete CBS Recordings)	Columbia 509740 2	2002	
Suite London	Eclipse	2006	with bonus tracks

=== Singles ===
Year	Title	Peak chart positions			
Year	Title	AUS	IRE	NZ	UK
1965	"Let the Sun Shine In"	―	―	―	50
1966	"Adam's Apple"	―	―	―	―
1966	"I've Got to Hold On"	―	―	―	―
1967	"What'll I Do"	―	―	―	―
1967	"Irresistable You"	―	―	―	―
1968	"Comin' Home Baby"	―	―	―	―
1969	"That's Life"	―	―	―	―
1969	"Birth"	41	20	―	17
1970	"Girlie"	―	―	1	34
1970	"Honey Come Back"	―	―	8	―
1970	"Tell the World We're Not In"	―	―	18	―
1971	"Have You Ever Been to Georgia"	―	―	―	―
1972	"This Strange Affair"	―	―	―	―
1972	"Back-Alley Jane"	―	―	―	―
1973	"Sing Me an Old Song"	―	―	―	―
1974	"Is There Anyone Out There"	―	―	―	―
1974	"That Song Is Driving Me Crazy"	―	―	―	―
1975	"You and Me Together"	92	―	―	―
"—" denotes releases that did not chart or were not released in that territory.
