= Trevor Morais =

British drummer

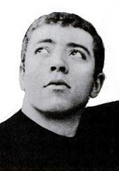
- Morais in 1968

Background information
- Born: 10 October 1944 (age 81); Liverpool, England
- Occupation: Drummer
- Years active: 1961–present

Trevor Morais (born 10 October 1944) is an English drummer who has been a member of several notable groups such as Faron's Flamingos, Rory Storm and The Hurricanes, The Peddlers, Quantum Jump and the Elkie Brooks backing band. He is also a session musician who has played on recordings by Tina Turner, David Essex, Howard Jones and Björk.

In the "Drummer" category, Morais came no. 7 in the 1967 Beat Instrumental Gold Star Awards.

== Early career ==
Born in Liverpool, Morais was the drummer in the groups Faron's Flamingos and Rory Storm and The Hurricanes, replacing Ringo Starr after he left to join The Beatles. According to Finding The Fourth Beatle by David Bedford and Garry Popper, Morais had been considered as a possible drummer for the Beatles, but Morais was an attraction and they did not want him with all of his showmanship. Some time later, Morais was a member of Ian Crawford & the Boomerangs.

He also tried to form his own group but gave up on the idea when he was invited to join a group called The Song Peddlers which would later be known as The Peddlers. In April 1964, The Peddlers line-up consisted of Morais on drums, keyboard playing singer Roy Phillips and bassist Tab Martin. They were a hip looking jazz and blues group. He stayed with the group until he left in 1972. He was replaced by New Zealander, Paul Johnston.

== Later career ==
In the late 1960s Morais bought Bendrose house and converted it into Farmyard Studios.

Morais played drums on Tina Turner's 1984 hit "Better Be Good to Me". Morais' drumming on the song was noted by Chris Welch in his book, The Tina Turner Experience where he said that Morais' stomping drums seemed to develop as much excitement as the Revue days.

During the 1990s, Morais was the drummer in Björk's touring band. In 1996 after an extensive tour, accepting an offer from Morais, Björk went to his studio in Málaga, Spain and ended up recording her Homogenic album there.
