= Lord Large =

Musical project by Stephen Large

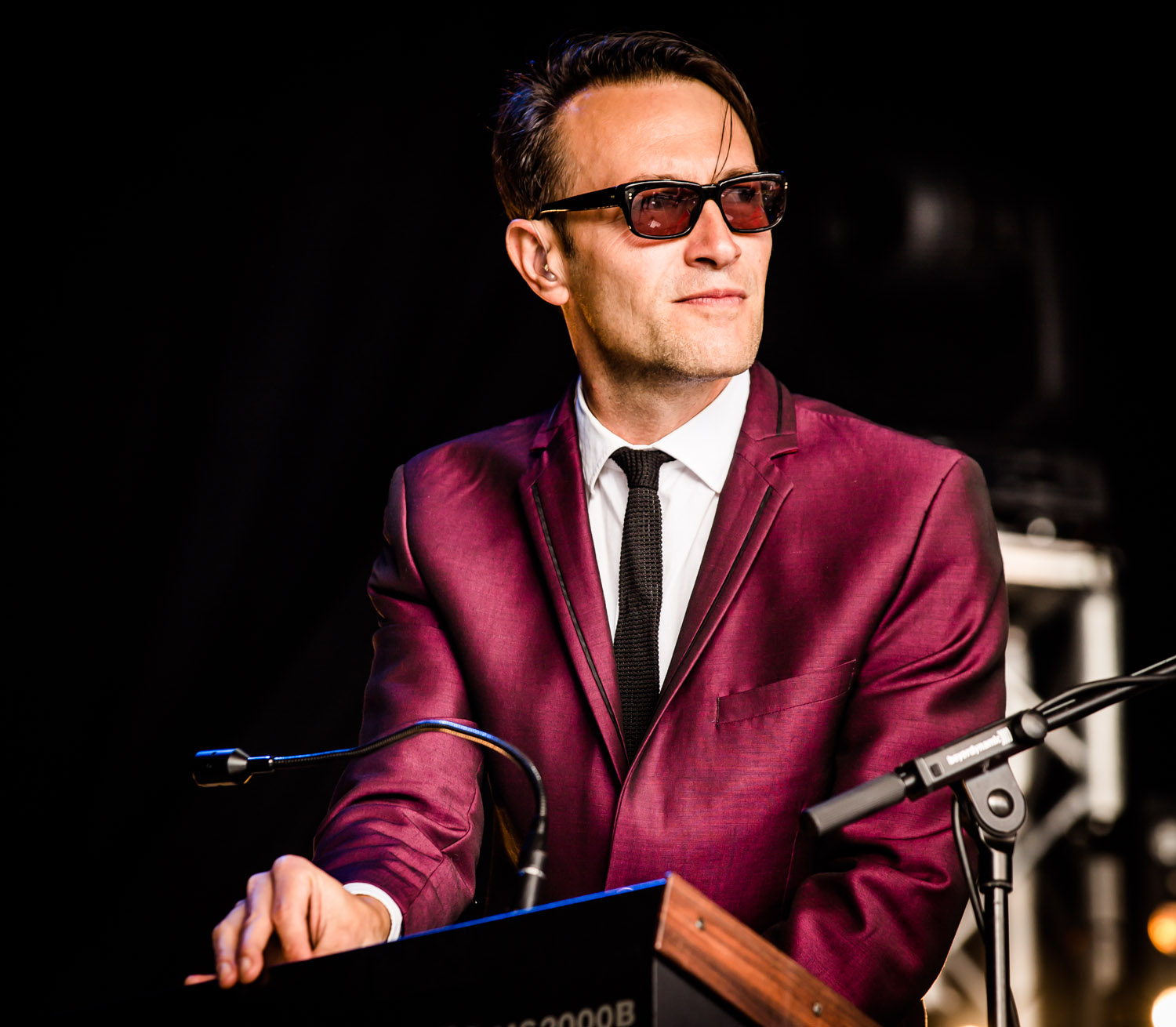

Background information
- Genres: Soul, R&B, pop
- Labels: Acid Jazz, 2Bit

Lord Large is a 1960s-influenced acid jazz band formed by Stephen Large, a British keyboard-player currently in Squeeze (and previously in the Electric Soft Parade, a band who won a Q Award and a Mercury Music Prize nomination in 2002) and drummer Andrew Jones (from Ronnie Scotts Rejects).

== Career ==
An album by Lord Large, The Lord's First XI, was released that featured Lord Large with some other artists namely Roy Phillips from the Peddlers, Clem Curtis of the Foundations, UK female soul singer Linda Lewis, Glenn Tilbrook and Dean Parrish. The album which contains a hidden bonus jam got a 4 star rating by Metro. It was given a 3 star rating by Mojo with Curtis' three songs as the highlights and "Stuck in a Wind Up" being the perfect Northern Soul dance floor filler. A number of singles were released including "Stuck in a Wind Up" by Lord Large feat Clem Curtis and "Left Right & Centre" by Lord Large featuring Dean Parrish. Parrish's single charted, peaking at No. 93 on 19 August 2016.

Lord Large performs regularly with other musicians at the North Pole cocktail bar in Greenwich.

== Members ==
=== Stephen Large ===
Stephen Large has recorded and toured with the following artists: the Ordinary Boys, the Dualers and Squeeze. He played organ on a Graham Coxon album. He has also recorded Glenn Tilbrook and has duetted with Glenn Tilbrook and Jools Holland.

=== Andrew Jones ===
As well as being the drummer for Ronnie Scotts Rejects, Jones has collaborated with the band Morcheeba and set up laptop pop record label 2bit Recordings in 2005.

== Discography ==
=== Singles ===
- Lord Large feat. Clem Curtis – "Stuck in a Wind Up" / "Move Over Daddy" – AJX 174 S
- Lord Large feat. Dean Parrish – "Left Right & Centre" / "Sun in the Sands" – AJX185 S (UK Singles Chart No. 93)
- Lord Large feat. Clem Curtis – "Stuck in a Wind Up" – AJX 174CDS
- Lord Large feat. Glenn Tilbrook – "Don't Stick Around Too Long" – AJX 179 CDS
- Lord Large feat. Dean Parrish – "Left Right & Centre" – AJX185CDS

=== Albums ===
- Lord Large – The Lord's First Eleven – AJX 182 LP
- Lord Large – The Lord's First Eleven – AJX 182 CD
