= Girlie (song) =

Song by The Peddlers

from the album Birthday
- A-side: "Girlie"
- B-side: "P.S. I Love You"
- Written: Roy Phillips
- Released: 1969
- Length: 2:44
- Label: CBS 4720
- Composer: Roy Phillips
- Producers: Cyril Smith; Arranged by: The Peddlers

Girlie was a hit song by British jazz/pop trio The Peddlers in 1970, in both the UK and New Zealand.

== Background ==
The song which was composed by Roy Phillips was released on CBS 4720 in January, 1970. It was backed with "P.S. I Love You Girlie". As a follow-up to their Top 10 hit "Birth", it didn't do as well and was a minor success. New Zealand was where the song would be a classic.

Along with "Birth", "Girlie" is from their Birthday album.

It was also covered by Patty Pravo and released as "Il Mio Fiore Nero". Lucio Dalla did a version of the song which appears on his Terra di gaibola album.

== Chart performance ==
Spending a total of four weeks in the UK singles chart, it peaked at No. 34 on January 31, 1970. However in New Zealand it had had a large impression and was hugely popular, giving them their highest charting single. It hit the no. 1 spot there in May 1970.
