= Sparks discography =

- Studio albums: 26
- Extended plays: 1
- Soundtrack albums: 3
- Live albums: 2
- Compilation albums: 12
- Singles: 80
- Video albums: 4
- Music videos: 44
- Collaborative albums: 1
- Compilation EPs: 3

The following is a comprehensive discography of Sparks, an American pop and rock music duo formed in Los Angeles in 1970 by brothers Ron (keyboards) and Russell Mael (vocals), initially under the name Halfnelson. Best known for their quirky approach to songwriting, Sparks' music is often accompanied by cutting and acerbic lyrics, and an idiosyncratic stage presence, typified in the contrast between Russell's wide-eyed hyperactive frontman antics and Ron's sedentary scowling.

== Albums ==
=== Studio albums ===
List of studio albums, with selected details, chart positions and certifications
Title	Album details	Chart positions										Certifications (sales thresholds)
Title	Album details	US	AUS	CAN	FRA	GER	NLD	NOR	SCO	SWE	UK	Certifications (sales thresholds)
Halfnelson (as Halfnelson) Sparks (re-release as Sparks)	Released: 1971; Re-released: February 1972; Labels: Bearsville, Warner Bros.	—	—	—	—	—	—	—	—	—	—	
A Woofer in Tweeter's Clothing	Released: October 1972; Labels: Bearsville, Warner Bros.	—	—	—	—	—	—	—	—	—	—	
Kimono My House	Released: May 1974; Label: Island	101	22	58	—	—	10	—	—	—	4	BPI: Gold
Propaganda	Released: November 1974; Label: Island	63	75	81	—	49	—	16	—	50	9	BPI: Silver
Indiscreet	Released: October 1975; Label: Island	169	—	86	—	—	19	18	—	6	18	
Big Beat	Released: October 1976; Labels: Island, Columbia	—	—	—	—	—	—	—	—	24	—	
Introducing Sparks	Released: October 1977; Labels: Columbia, CBS	—	—	—	—	—	—	—	—	41	—	
No. 1 in Heaven	Released: September 1979; Labels: Virgin, Elektra, Warner Bros., Ariola, Oasis	—	63	—	—	—	—	—	—	43	73	
Terminal Jive	Released: 1980; Labels: Virgin, Carrere/Underdog, Ariola, Oasis	—	96	—	—	—	—	—	—	—	—	
Whomp That Sucker	Released: 1981; Labels: Why-Fi, Carrere, Ariola, Oasis, RCA	182	—	—	—	—	—	—	—	—	—	
Angst in My Pants	Released: May 1982; Labels: Atlantic, Carrere	173	—	—	—	—	—	—	—	—	—	
In Outer Space	Released: April 1983; Labels: Atlantic, Carrere/Underdog, Oasis	88	—	—	—	—	—	—	—	—	—	
Pulling Rabbits Out of a Hat	Released: 1984; Labels: Atlantic, Oasis	—	—	—	—	—	—	—	—	—	—	
Music That You Can Dance To	Released: September 1986; Labels: MCA, Consolidated Allied, Disques Vogue	—	—	—	—	—	—	—	—	—	—	
Interior Design	Released: August 1988; Labels: Rhino/Fine Art, Carrere	—	—	—	—	—	—	—	—	—	—	
Gratuitous Sax & Senseless Violins	Released: November 1994; Label: Logic	—	—	—	—	29	—	—	45	—	150	
Plagiarism	Released: June 23, 1997; Labels: Roadrunner, Virgin Schallplatten	—	—	—	—	—	—	—	—	—	—	
Balls	Released: August 28, 2000; Labels: Recognition, Strange Ways, Oglio	—	—	—	—	—	—	—	22	—	—	
Lil' Beethoven	Released: November 26, 2002; Labels: Artful/Lil' Beethoven	—	—	—	—	—	—	—	13	—	—	
Hello Young Lovers	Released: February 6, 2006; Labels: Gut, In the Red	—	—	—	—	—	—	—	28	48	66	
Exotic Creatures of the Deep	Released: May 19, 2008; Label: Lil' Beethoven	—	—	—	—	—	—	—	28	—	54	
The Seduction of Ingmar Bergman	Released: August 15, 2009; Labels: SR, Lil' Beethoven	—	—	—	—	—	—	—	17	—	—	
Hippopotamus	Released: September 8, 2017; Label: BMG	—	—	—	108	88	38	—	7	45	7	
A Steady Drip, Drip, Drip	Released: May 15, 2020; Label: BMG	—	—	—	159	24	88	—	2	—	7	
The Girl Is Crying in Her Latte	Released: May 26, 2023; Label: Island	—	—	—	128	37	—	—	2	—	7	
Mad!	Released: May 23, 2025; Label: Transgressive	—	—	—	—	48	—	—	1	—	2	

=== Extended plays ===
List of extended plays with selected details
Title	EP details	Chart positions
Title	EP details	UK Vinyl
Madder!	Released: October 3, 2025; Label: Transgressive	1 (Note: On the Official Charts Company website, Madder! was credited as its opening track "Porcupine" on the Vinyl Singles Chart. The given catalog number matches the standard vinyl release of the EP.)

=== Collaborative albums ===
List of collaborative albums, with selected details and chart positions
Title	Album details	Chart positions									
Title	Album details	AUS	AUT	FRA	GER	ITA	NLD	SCO	SPA	SWI	UK
FFS (with Franz Ferdinand as FFS)	Released: June 8, 2015; Label: Domino	85	36	27	22	60	13	8	53	19	17

=== Soundtrack albums ===
List of soundtrack albums, with selected details and chart positions
Title	Album details	Chart positions			
Title	Album details	BEL (FL)	FRA	GER	SCO
Annette	Released: July 2, 2021; Labels: Sony	68	90	72	32
The Sparks Brothers	Released: March 2022; Label: Waxwork	—	—	—	—
Annette – An Opera by Sparks (The Original 2013 Recordings)	Released: November 14, 2024; Label: Lil' Beethoven	—	—	—	—

=== Live albums ===
List of live albums, with selected details
Title	Album details
Two Hands, One Mouth: Live in Europe	Released: March 2013; Label: Lil' Beethoven
Sparks Live on the Moon	Released: August 14, 2026; Label: Transgressive

=== Compilation albums ===
- 2 Originals of Sparks (1975, Bearsville) – Double LP set consisting of Halfnelson and A Woofer in Tweeter's Clothing
- The Best of Sparks (1978, Island Records)
- The History of the Sparks (1981, Carrere)
- Mael Intuition (The Best of the Sparks 1974-76) (1990, Island)
- Profile: The Ultimate Sparks Collection (1991, Rhino)
- The Heaven Collection (1993, Underdog/Sony France)
- The Hell Collection (1993, Underdog/Sony France)
- In the Swing (1993, Spectrum/Karussell)
- The 12 Inch Mixes (1996, Kiosk)
- 12" Mixes (1999, Oglio Records)
- The Best of Sparks (2000, Repertoire Records)
- This Album's Big Enough… The Best of Sparks (2002, Music Club)
- Shortcuts – The 7inch Mixes (1979–1984) (2012, Repertoire)
- Extended – The 12inch Mixes (1979–1984) (2012, Repertoire)
- Real Extended: The 12 inch Mixes (1979–1984) (2012, Repertoire) Improved and Corrected Version of above
- New Music for Amnesiacs: The Essential Collection (2013, Lil Beethoven Records)
- The Best & The Rest Of The Island Years 74-78 (2018, Island Records, 2 (Limited Edition, Remastered, Red Translucent) Vinyle LP)
- Past Tense – The Best of Sparks (2019, BMG Rights Management UK) SC #23, UK #73

=== Compilation EPs ===
- On Tour EP (1983, Atlantic)
- 4 Track EP (1983, Virgin)
- Dick Around (2006, In the Red)
- Past Tense, the best of (2019, BMG)

== Singles ==
=== 1970s ===
Year	Single	Chart positions									Album
Year	Single	US	AUS	BEL (FL)	BEL (WA)	GER	IRE	NLD	SWI	UK	Album
1972	"Wonder Girl"	112	—	—	—	—	—	—	—	—	Sparks
1974	"This Town Ain't Big Enough for Both of Us"	—	69	4	3	12	—	4	7	2	Kimono My House
1974	"Girl from Germany"	—	—	—	—	—	—	—	—	51 (Note: Chart position is from the official UK "Breakers List".)	A Woofer in Tweeter's Clothing
1974	"Amateur Hour"	—	—	22	36	12	19	6	—	7	Kimono My House
1974	"Talent Is an Asset" (US and New Zealand only)	—	—	—	—	—	—	—	—	—	Kimono My House
1974	"Never Turn Your Back on Mother Earth"	—	—	—	48	40	—	—	—	13	Propaganda
1974	"Propaganda/At Home, at Work, at Play" (FR only)	—	—	—	—	—	—	—	—	—	Propaganda
1975	"Something for the Girl with Everything"	—	—	—	—	—	—	—	—	17	Propaganda
1975	"Achoo" (US only)	—	—	—	—	—	—	—	—	—	Propaganda
1975	"Get in the Swing"	—	—	—	38	—	—	—	—	27	Indiscreet
1975	"Looks, Looks, Looks"	—	—	—	—	—	—	—	—	26	Indiscreet
1976	"I Want to Hold Your Hand"	—	—	—	—	—	—	—	—	—	Non-album single
1976	"Big Boy"	—	—	—	—	—	—	—	—	—	Big Beat
1976	"I Like Girls"	—	—	—	—	—	—	—	—	—	Big Beat
1977	"Over the Summer" (US only)	—	—	—	—	—	—	—	—	—	Introducing Sparks
1977	"A Big Surprise"	—	—	—	—	—	—	—	—	—	Introducing Sparks
1979	"La Dolce Vita"	—	—	—	—	—	—	—	—	—	No. 1 in Heaven
1979	"The Number One Song in Heaven"	—	85	—	—	—	5	—	—	14	No. 1 in Heaven
1979	"Beat the Clock"	—	—	10	—	—	—	16	—	10	No. 1 in Heaven
1979	"Tryouts for the Human Race"	—	—	—	—	—	—	—	—	45	No. 1 in Heaven

=== 1980s ===
Year	Single	Chart positions						Album
Year	Single	US Hot 100	US D-P	US D-S	AUS	FRA	UK	Album
1980	"When I'm with You"	—	—	—	17	1	—	Terminal Jive
1980	"Young Girls"	—	—	—	—	—	— (Note: This single did not enter the UK Singles Chart, but did reach number 93 on the Record Business Singles Chart.)	Terminal Jive
1981	"Tips for Teens"	—	—	—	—	—	— (Note: This single did not enter the UK Singles Chart, but did reach number 93 on the Record Business Singles Top 100 chart.)	Whomp That Sucker
1981	"Funny Face"	—	—	—	—	—	—	Whomp That Sucker
1982	"I Predict"	60	—	—	—	—	—	Angst in My Pants
1982	"Angst in My Pants" (DE only)	—	—	—	—	—	—	Angst in My Pants
1982	"Eaten by the Monster of Love" (US only)	—	—	—	—	—	—	Angst in My Pants
1982	"Modesty Plays"	—	—	—	—	—	—	Non-album single
1983	"Get Crazy/Hot Shot" (Malcolm McDowell) (Split single)	—	—	—	—	—	—	Get Crazy (OST)
1983	"Cool Places" (with Jane Wiedlin)	49	13	—	—	—	—	In Outer Space
1983	"All You Ever Think About Is Sex" (US only)	—	—	—	—	—	—	In Outer Space
1983	"Please Baby, Please" (FR only)	—	—	—	—	—	—	In Outer Space
1984	"With All My Might"	104	28	—	—	—	—	Pulling Rabbits Out of a Hat
1984	"Progress" (US 12" only)	—	28	—	—	—	—	Pulling Rabbits Out of a Hat
1984	"Pretending to Be Drunk/Kiss Me Quick"	—	60	—	—	—	—	Pulling Rabbits Out of a Hat
1985	"Give It Up" (Evelyn "Champagne" King)/"Armies of the Night" (Split single)	—	—	—	—	—	—	Music That You Can Dance To
1985	"Change"	—	—	—	—	—	85	Music That You Can Dance To
1986	"Music That You Can Dance To"	—	6	11	—	—	—	Music That You Can Dance To
1986	"Fingertips/The Scene" (US 12" only)	—	38	—	—	—	—	Music That You Can Dance To
1987	"Rosebud" (UK only)	—	—	—	—	—	—	Music That You Can Dance To
1988	"So Important"	—	8	—	—	—	—	Interior Design
1989	"Madonna" (FR only)	—	—	—	—	—	—	Interior Design
1989	"Just Got Back from Heaven"	—	7	24	—	—	—	Interior Design
1989	"Singing in the Shower" (Les Rita Mitsouko and Sparks)	—	24	—	—	37	—	Marc & Robert

=== 1990s ===
Year	Single	Chart positions									Album
Year	Single	US D-P	AUS	BEL (FL)	BEL (WA)	GER	NLD	SCO	SWI	UK	Album
1993	"National Crime Awareness Week"	—	—	—	—	—	—	—	—	—	Non-album single
1994	"When Do I Get to Sing 'My Way'"	9	—	16	12	7	35	41	22	38	Gratuitous Sax & Senseless Violins
1995	"When I Kiss You (I Hear Charlie Parker Playing)"	24	—	—	—	61	—	38	—	36	Gratuitous Sax & Senseless Violins
1995	"When Do I Get to Sing 'My Way'" (UK re-issue)	—	—	—	—	—	—	35	—	32	Gratuitous Sax & Senseless Violins
1995	"Now That I Own the BBC"	—	—	—	—	81	—	53	—	60	Gratuitous Sax & Senseless Violins
1997	"The Number One Song in Heaven"	28	—	—	—	—	—	54	—	70	Plagiarism
1997	"This Town Ain't Big Enough for Both of Us" (with Faith No More)	—	69	—	—	—	—	39	—	40	Plagiarism
1999	"More Than a Sex Machine" (DE only)	—	—	—	—	—	—	—	—	—	Balls

=== 2000s ===
Year	Single	Chart positions		Album
Year	Single	SCO	UK	Album
2000	"The Calm Before the Storm"	—	—	Balls
2000	"The Angels" (DE only)	—	—	Balls
2003	"Suburban Homeboy" (UK only)	—	142	Lil' Beethoven
2006	"Perfume" (UK only)	46	80	Hello Young Lovers
2006	"Dick Around/Waterproof"	67	139	Hello Young Lovers
2008	"Good Morning"	—	147	Exotic Creatures of the Deep
2009	"Lighten Up, Morrissey" (UK only)	—	—	Exotic Creatures of the Deep

=== 2010s ===
Year	Single	Chart positions	Album
Year	Single	BEL (FL)	Album
2015	"Johnny Delusional"	90	FFS
2015	"Call Girl"	—	FFS
2015	"Police Encounters"	—	FFS
2015	"Christmas Without a Prayer"	—	Non-album single
2017	"Hippopotamus"	—	Hippopotamus
2017	"What the Hell Is It This Time?"	—	Hippopotamus
2017	"Edith Piaf (Said It Better Than Me)"	—	Hippopotamus
2017	"I Wish You Were Fun"	—	Hippopotamus
2017	"Check Out Time 11am"	—	Record Store Day exclusive single
2018	"You Earned the Right to Be a Dick" (Hippopotamus shaped disc)	—	Record Store Day exclusive single
2019	"Please Don't Fuck Up My World"	—	A Steady Drip, Drip, Drip

=== 2020s ===
Year	Single	Chart positions			Album/EP
Year	Single	IRE	NZ Hot	UK	Album/EP
2020	"Self-Effacing"	—	—	—	A Steady Drip, Drip, Drip
2020	"I'm Toast"	—	—	—	A Steady Drip, Drip, Drip
2020	"One for the Ages"	—	—	—	A Steady Drip, Drip, Drip
2020	"Lawnmower"	—	—	—	A Steady Drip, Drip, Drip
2021	"Your Fandango" (with Todd Rundgren)	—	—	—	Space Force
2023	"The Girl Is Crying in Her Latte"	—	—	—	The Girl Is Crying in Her Latte
2023	"Veronica Lake"	—	—	—	The Girl Is Crying in Her Latte
2023	"Nothing Is as Good as They Say It Is"	—	—	—	The Girl Is Crying in Her Latte
2024	"Don't Go Away" (with Max Richter)	—	—	—	Spaceman (OST)
2025	"Do Things My Own Way"	—	—	—	Mad!
2025	"JanSport Backpack"	—	—	—	Mad!
2025	"Drowned in a Sea of Tears"	—	—	—	Mad!
2025	"My Devotion"	—	—	—	Mad!
2025	"A Little Bit of Light Banter"	—	—	—	Mad!
2025	"Porcupine"	—	—	—	Madder!
2025	"The Happy Dictator" (with Gorillaz)	77	13	73	The Mountain
2026	"Whippings and Apologies" (live)	—	—	—	Sparks Live on the Moon
2026	"Lord Have Mercy" (live)	—	—	—	Sparks Live on the Moon

== Collaborations and contributions ==
- 1979 – produced and wrote an album called Is There More to Life Than Dancing? for singer Noël.
- 1979 – produced the album Pas Dormir for a French band Bijou.
- 1979 – produced the single "C'est Sheep" by Adrian Munsey.
- 1981 – wrote the lyrics for the album Sex by Telex.
- 1981 – Russell Mael contributed backing vocals for the album Pleasant Dreams by Ramones.
- 1982 – worked with Lio on her album Suite Sixtine, which was a compilation of French rarities and English versions (translated by Sparks) of tracks from her first album.
- 1983 – "Minnie Mouse" for The Walt Disney Company from Splashdance.
- 1984 – co-wrote the song "Yes or No" for the Go-Go's album Talk Show.
- 1987 – Russell Mael provided backing vocals for Salon Music for This Is Salon Music.
- 1988 – "In My Life" and "Say Hello, Wave Goodbye" with Salon Music for O Boy.
- 1988 – "Singing in the Shower", "Live in Las Vegas" and "Hip Kit" with Les Rita Mitsouko from Marc & Robert.
- 1990 – Russell Mael contributed backing vocals to the song "You Drive, I'll Steer" for the album Busted by Cheap Trick.
- 2001 – "Kimono" with Pizzicato Five from Çà et là du Japon.
- 2001 – "La Nuit Est Là" and "Yo Quiero Màs Dinero" with Grand Popo Football Club from Shampoo Victims.
- 2003 – "We Are the Clash", a cover for Uncut magazine's the Clash tribute CD White Riot.
- 2004 – "Acid Pants" with Orbital from Blue Album.
- 2006 – remixed Morrissey's song, "Suedehead", for the compilation Future Retro.
- 2010 – remixed the song "Give Me Something" by Yoko Ono.
- 2010 – remixed the song "A Happy Place" by Katie Melua as Sparks Vs Katie Melua.
- 2012 – produced Gemma Ray's cover versions of Sparks songs "How Do I Get to Carnegie Hall" and "Eaten by the Monster of Love".
- 2019 – featured on Sebastian's 2019 song "Handcuffed to a Parking Meter" off his 2019 album Thirst
- 2025 – appeared on Étoile performing an orchestral version of "I Married Myself" for a ballet solo.
- 2025 – featured on Gorillaz' single "The Happy Dictator", off their 2026 album The Mountain.

== Soundtrack appearances ==
- Rollercoaster (1977) – "Big Boy" and "Fill 'Er Up"
- Valley Girl (1983) – "Angst in My Pants" and "Eaten by the Monster of Love"
- Get Crazy (1983) – "Get Crazy"
- Where the Boys Are '84 (1984) – "Mini-Skirted"
- Heavenly Bodies (1984) – "Breaking Out of Prison"
- Bad Manners (aka Growing Pains) (1984) – "Growing Pains", "Motorcycle Midget", "What You're Wearing" (with Laurie Bell) and "Growing Pains (Reprise)"
- Fright Night (1985) – "The Armies of the Night"
- Rad (1986) – "Music That You Can Dance To"
- Black Rain (1989) – "Singing in the Shower"
- Unlawful Entry (1992) – "National Crime Awareness Week"
- Knock Off (1998) – Original Musical Score and "It's a Knockoff"
- Boarding Gate (2007) – "The Number One Song in Heaven"
- Rendition (2007) – "Camel Jam" and "Nous-Nous"
- Cabin Fever 2: Spring Fever (2009) – "Eaten by the Monster of Love"
- Kick Ass (2010) – "This Town Ain't Big Enough for Both of Us"
- Alan Partridge: Alpha Papa (2013) – "The Number One Song in Heaven"
- The Overnight (2015) – "Tryouts for the Human Race"
- Master of None (2015) – "Tryouts for the Human Race"
- The Forbidden Room (2015) – Original song "The Final Derriere"
- A Futile and Stupid Gesture (2018) – "Beat the Clock"
- Justified: City Primeval (2023) – "This Town Ain't Big Enough for Both of Us"
- Yellowjackets (2023) – "Angst In My Pants"
- Spaceman (2024) – "Don't Go Away" with Max Richter
- Sign Here (Firma aquí) (2024) – "All That"
- The Decameron (2024) – "All You Ever Think About Is Sex"
- Mr. Bigstuff (2025) – "This Town Ain't Big Enough for Both of Us"

== Video ==
- Amateur Hour (V-CD, 1995)
- Live in London (2003)
- Lil' Beethoven – Live In Stockholm (2004)
- DEE VEE DEE – Live at the London Forum (2007)

== Music videos ==
Year	Video	Director	Ref.
1974	"This Town Ain't Big Enough for Both of Us"		
1977	"Occupation"		
1979	"The Number One Song in Heaven"	Bruce Gowers	
1979	"Beat the Clock"	Brian Grant	
1979	"La Dolce Vita"	Bruce Gowers	
1979	"Tryouts for the Human Race"	Brian Grant	
1980	"When I'm with You"	Brian Grant	
1980	"Stereo"	Brian Grant	
1981	"Tips for Teens"		
1981	"Funny Face"		
1982	"I Predict"	Steve and Doug Martin	
1983	"Minnie Mouse"	The Walt Disney Company	
1983	"Cool Places"	Graeme Whifler	
1983	"All You Ever Think About Is Sex"	Pat Warner	
1984	"With All My Might"	Graeme Whifler	
1986	"Music That You Can Dance To"	Ron & Russell Mael	
1988	"So Important"	Ron & Russell Mael	
1989	"Singing in the Shower"		
1993	"National Crime Awareness Week"	Finitribe	
1994	"When Do I Get to Sing 'My Way'"	Sophie Muller	
1995	"When I Kiss You (I Hear Charlie Parker Playing)"	Sophie Muller	
1995	"Now That I Own the BBC"	Oliver Kuntzel & Florence Deygas	
1997	"No. 1 Song in Heaven (Plagiarism)"	Oliver Kuntzel & Florence Deygas	
2000	"The Calm Before the Storm"	Oliver Kuntzel & Florence Deygas	
2003	"The Rhythm Thief"	Oliver Kuntzel & Florence Deygas	
2003	"I Married Myself"	Oliver Kuntzel & Florence Deygas	
2004	"My Baby's Taking Me Home"	Shaw Petronio	
2006	"Perfume"	Shaw Petronio	
2006	"Dick Around"	Shaw Petronio	
2009	"Lighten Up Morrissey"	Shaw Petronio	
2015	"Christmas Without a Prayer"		
2017	"Hippopotamus"	Scott Peters	
2017	"What the Hell Is It This Time?"	Galen and Evan Johnson	
2017	"Edith Piaf (Said It Better Than Me)"	Joseph Wallace	
2020	"One for the Ages"	Chintis Lundgren	
2020	"Lawnmower"	Ron & Russell Mael	
2020	"The Existential Threat"	Cyriak Harris	
2020	"iPhone"		
2021	"Left Out in the Cold"		
2021	"Your Fandango"	Liisa Vääriskoski	
2021	"So May We Start"	Leos Carax	
2023	"The Girl Is Crying in Her Latte"	Richie Starzec, Ron & Russell Mael	
2023	"Escalator"	Paul Trewartha, Ron & Russell Mael	
2025	"Do Things My Own Way"	Ambar Navarro	
2025	"Drowned in a Sea of Tears"	Ambar Navarro	
2025	"Porcupine"	Fred Rowson	
