= Sparks Live on the Moon =

Live album by Sparks
- Released: August 14, 2026
- Recorded: 2025
- Length: 91:01
- Label: Transgressive
- Producer: Russell Mael

Sparks chronology
Madder! (2025)	Sparks Live on the Moon (2026)

Singles from Sparks Live on the Moon
- 1. "Whippings and Apologies" Released: June 15, 2026; 2. "Lord Have Mercy" Released: July 22, 2026

Sparks Live on the Moon is the second live album by the American duo Sparks, released on August 14, 2026, through Transgressive Records. It was led by the singles "Whippings and Apologies" and "Lord Have Mercy".

== Background and recording ==
Sparks Live on the Moon was recorded in 2025, after the duo finished their tour that year in support of their studio album Mad!. They promoted the live album as having taken place at the Taruntius crater on the Moon. It is the group's first live album of a full concert and their second live album overall, following 2013's Two Hands, One Mouth: Live in Europe.

== Content ==
The songs on the live album cover material from Sparks albums as early as A Woofer in Tweeter's Clothing (1972) up to their most recent album Mad! (2025), and it includes a notable songs such as "This Town Ain't Big Enough for Both of Us", "The Number One Song in Heaven" and "When Do I Get to Sing My Way'". Actress Cate Blanchett provided her voice for both the introduction and the outro.

== Singles and release ==
Sparks Live on the Moon was preceded by the singles "Whippings and Apologies" on June 15, 2026 and "Lord Have Mercy" the following July 22. The album was released digitally and on CD on August 14, 2026, through Transgressive Records. The double vinyl edition is expected to follow on September 4.

== Critical reception ==
Professional ratings
Review scores
Source	Rating
Classic Pop	4/5 stars
Classic Rock	9/10
Rock & Folk	4/5 stars
Spectrum Culture	76%
Under the Radar	8/10

In Classic Rock magazine, Sparks Live on the Moon was rated nine out of ten, with reviewer Sylvie Simmons commenting that the Mael brothers and their backing band sounded "sharp, cool and bonkers as ever". They singled out "So May We Start", "Goofing Off" and "Please Don't Fuck Up My World" as album highlights. Elsewhere, critic Wyndham Wallace, in a four-star review for Classic Pop, said that there was "no shortage of [inspiration] here", citing their performances of No. 1 in Heaven (1979) tracks as prime examples.

== Track listing ==
All tracks are written by Ron and Russell Mael.

Sparks Live on the Moon track listing
No.	Title	Original album	Length
1.	"So May We Start"	Annette (Cannes Edition) (2021)	3:59
2.	"Do Things My Own Way"	Mad! (2025)	3:54
3.	"Reinforcements"	Propaganda (1974)	4:17
4.	"Academy Award Performance"	No. 1 in Heaven (1979)	5:21
5.	"Goofing Off"	Introducing Sparks (1977)	3:51
6.	"Beat the Clock"	No. 1 in Heaven	4:36
7.	"Please Don't Fuck Up My World"	A Steady Drip, Drip, Drip (2020)	4:53
8.	"Running Up a Tab at the Hotel for the Fab"	Mad!	4:47
9.	"Suburban Homeboy" ("Ron Speaks" version)	Lil' Beethoven – BMG deluxe edition (2022)	3:12
10.	"All You Ever Think About Is Sex"	In Outer Space (1983)	4:27
11.	"Drowned in a Sea of Tears"	Mad!	3:32
12.	"JanSport Backpack"	Mad!	4:12
13.	"Music That You Can Dance To"	Music That You Can Dance To (1986)	4:21
14.	"When Do I Get to Sing 'My Way'"	Gratuitous Sax and Senseless Violins (1994)	4:58
15.	"The Number One Song in Heaven"	No. 1 in Heaven	5:53
16.	"This Town Ain't Big Enough for Both of Us"	Kimono My House (1974)	3:50
17.	"Whippings and Apologies"	A Woofer in Tweeter's Clothing (1972)	5:32
18.	"Lord Have Mercy"	Mad!	5:05
19.	"The Girl Is Crying in Her Latte"	The Girl Is Crying in Her Latte (2023)	3:35
20.	"All That"	A Steady, Drip, Drip, Drip	6:46
Total length:			91:01

Notes

- On digital releases, all tracks are listed with "Live On The Moon" in parentheses.

== Personnel ==
Except where noted, credits are adapted from Tidal.

=== Sparks ===
- Russell Mael – vocals, production
- Ron Mael – synthesizer

=== Backing band ===
- Eli Pearl – guitar
- Darren Weiss – drums
- Evan Weiss – guitar
- Max Whipple – bass

=== Additional contributors ===
- Cate Blanchett – MC ("So May We Start" and "All That")
- David Wrench – mixing
- Bill Inglot – mastering
- Dave Schultz – mastering

== Charts ==
Chart performance for Sparks Live on the Moon
Chart (2026)	Peak position
Scottish Albums (Official Charts)	11
Swedish Physical Albums (Sverigetopplistan)	19
UK Albums Sales (Official Charts)	19
UK Independent Albums (Official Charts)	7
