= Two Hands, One Mouth: Live in Europe =

Live album by Sparks
- Released: March 18, 2013
- Genre: Art pop
- Length: 86:02
- Label: Lil' Beethoven

Sparks chronology
The Seduction of Ingmar Bergman (2009)	Two Hands, One Mouth: Live in Europe (2013)	FFS (2015)

Two Hands, One Mouth: Live in Europe is an album by American rock and pop duo Sparks, released in March 2013. It is their first live and first double CD album.

== Background and recording ==
With the release of The Seduction of Ingmar Bergman, Sparks had twenty-two studio albums to its name, yet brothers and bandmates Ron and Russell Mael had never performed live as a duo. During the No. 1 in Heaven years, the shift from the presence of a full backing band presented a unique opportunity to tour instead as a two-piece band; however, technological limitations and logistics prevented this from happening. In an interview with Sound on Sound, Ron Mael stated that, at the time, "there was no way to bring a synthesizer the size of a building with you onto the stage." By June 2012, 33 years after the release of No. 1 in Heaven, Sparks performed for the first time without a backing band at Bush Hall in London.

In October 2012, bandmates Ron and Russell Mael fully embarked on the "Two Hands, One Mouth Tour." The tour started in Europe across eighteen cities, visiting Lithuania, Latvia, Finland, Norway, Sweden, Germany, Belgium, the United Kingdom, and Ireland, finishing at the sold-out Barbican Centre in London. In reviewing a concert at the Caley Picture House in Edinburgh for the Sunday Mail, John Kelly stated that despite the relative simplicity of their performance, when playing their most well-known hits, the songs "exploded into life."

The next leg of the tour took the group to Tokyo and Osaka, Japan in January of the following year. In April 2013, the show, dubbed "The Revenge of Two Hands, One Mouth Tour," went to the United States for a short series of concerts, including two performances at Coachella Festival.

Two Hands, One Mouth: Live In Europe was released in March 2013, containing live recordings gathered from various concerts during the European leg of the tour in October 2012. The album sees the Mael brothers perform various works from their discography, ranging from the 1974's Kimono My House to 2009's The Seduction of Ingmar Bergman; also included is a rendition of "Singing in the Shower," a Sparks-written single originally performed with Les Rita Mitsouko and released as part of their album Marc & Robert in 1988.

== Critical reception ==
Professional ratings
Review scores
Source	Rating
Classic Rock	3.5/5 stars
Sunday Mail	(favorable)
Uncut	7/10

Reviewing for Uncut, Stephen Dalton said that while the "stripped-down" approach "is a little shrill in places", the album is "mostly excellent," in particular the renditions from No. 1 in Heaven on the second disc.

== Track listing ==
All tracks are written by Ron Mael or by Ron Mael and Russell Mael.

CD 1: The Show
No.	Title	Originally On	Length
1.	"Sparks Overture" I. "I Married Myself" II. "Looks, Looks, Looks" III. "Good Morning" IV. "The Number One Song in Heaven" V. "This Town Ain't Big Enough for Both of Us" VI. "Dick Around" VII. "Never Turn Your Back on Mother Earth" VIII. "Something for the Girl with Everything" IX. "Suburban Homeboy" X. "I Married Myself (Reprise)"	Excerpts from: Kimono My House (V); Propaganda (VII, VIII); Indiscreet (II); No. 1 in Heaven (IV); Lil' Beethoven (I, IX, X); Hello Young Lovers (VI); Exotic Creatures of the Deep (III)	3:24
2.	"Hospitality on Parade"	Indiscreet	4:13
3.	"Metaphor"	Hello Young Lovers	4:20
4.	"Propaganda"	Propaganda	0:24
5.	"At Home, at Work, at Play"	Propaganda	3:18
6.	"Sherlock Holmes"	Angst in My Pants	3:33
7.	"Good Morning"	Exotic Creatures of the Deep	3:48
8.	"Under the Table with Her"	Indiscreet	3:07
9.	"My Baby's Taking Me Home"	Lil' Beethoven	5:10
10.	"Singing in the Shower"	Marc & Robert (Les Rita Mitsouko album)	3:26
11.	"The Wedding of Jacqueline Kennedy to Russell Mael"	B-side of "Looks Looks Looks"	1:46
12.	"Excerpts from The Seduction of Ingmar Bergman" I. "I Am Ingmar Bergman" II. "Mr. Bergman How Are You?" III. "We've Got to Turn Him 'Round" IV. "He's Home"	The Seduction of Ingmar Bergman	6:45
13.	"Dick Around"	Hello Young Lovers	2:45
14.	"Never Turn Your Back on Mother Earth"	Propaganda	2:16
15.	"This Town Ain't Big Enough for Both of Us"	Kimono My House	3:09
16.	"The Rhythm Thief"	Lil' Beethoven	4:17
17.	"Suburban Homeboy"	Lil' Beethoven	3:56
18.	"When Do I Get to Sing 'My Way'"	Gratuitous Sax & Senseless Violins	6:01
Total length:			65:38

CD 2: The Encore
No.	Title	Originally on	Length
1.	"The Number One Song in Heaven"	No. 1 in Heaven	7:01
2.	"Beat the Clock"	No. 1 in Heaven	7:17
3.	"Two Hands, One Mouth"	Previously unreleased	6:06
Total length:			20:24

== Personnel ==
Credits are adapted from Two Hands, One Mouth: Live in Europe CD liner notes.

Sparks

- Ron Mael – keyboards
- Russell Mael – vocals

Production and design

- Jonny Clark – FOH and album mixing
- Paul Birks – lighting
- Robert Garnham – technician
- Richie Mills and James Findlay – crew
- Bill Inglot and Dave Schultz – mastering
- Galen Johnson – cover illustration
- Rachel Gutek – album design
- Emmi Joutsi – cover photography
- Ron and Russell Mael – tour photos
