= The Sparks Brothers =

2021 documentary film directed by Edgar Wright

- Theatrical release poster
- Directed by: Edgar Wright
- Produced by: Nira Park; Edgar Wright; George Hencken; Laura Richardson
- Starring: Ron Mael; Russell Mael
- Cinematography: Jake Polonsky
- Edited by: Paul Trewartha
- Production companies: MRC; Complete Fiction Pictures
- Distributed by: Focus Features (United States); Universal Pictures (International)
- Release dates: January 30, 2021 (Sundance); June 18, 2021 (United States); July 30, 2021 (United Kingdom)
- Running time: 140 minutes
- Countries: United Kingdom; United States
- Language: English
- Box office: $1.2 million

The Sparks Brothers is a 2021 documentary film about Ron and Russell Mael, members of the pop and rock duo Sparks. The film, directed by Edgar Wright, was produced by Wright, Nira Park, George Hencken and Laura Richardson, premiered at the 2021 Sundance Film Festival and was theatrically released the following summer. It received critical acclaim.

== Summary ==
The documentary features lengthy interviews with Ron and Russell Mael, along with short interviews with musicians, record producers who collaborated with the band, previous members of the group who worked with the Maels in the various Sparks line-ups from the early 1970s until the early 2020s, as well as a number of fans. The documentary also includes several short animation sequences to reproduce apocryphal anecdotes between musicians with the participation of comedians and frequent Wright collaborators Simon Pegg (as the voice of John Lennon) and Nick Frost (as the voice of Ringo Starr).

== Participants ==
- Ron Mael
- Russell Mael
- Edgar Wright
- Beck
- Roddy Bottum
- Jane Wiedlin
- Flea
- Steve Jones
- Alex Kapranos
- Stephen Morris
- Gillian Gilbert
- Vince Clarke
- Andy Bell
- "Weird Al" Yankovic
- Thurston Moore
- James Lowe
- Nick Rhodes
- John Taylor
- Martyn Ware
- Björk (voice only)
- Nick Heyward
- Muff Winwood
- David Weigel
- Pamela Des Barres
- Hilly Michaels
- Bernard Butler
- Jack Antonoff
- Todd Rundgren
- Giorgio Moroder
- Tony Visconti
- Dean Menta
- Les Bohem
- Christi Haydon
- Harley Feinstein
- Jonathan Ross
- Paul Morley
- Katie Puckrik
- Adam Buxton
- Neil Gaiman
- Tosh Berman
- Jason Schwartzman
- Mark Gatiss
- Mike Myers
- Fred Armisen
- Amy Sherman-Palladino and Daniel Palladino
- Scott Aukerman
- Patton Oswalt
- Simon Pegg as the voice of John Lennon
- Nick Frost as the voice of Ringo Starr

== Production ==
In June 2018, it was announced Wright would direct an untitled documentary film revolving around the band Sparks, with MRC Non-Fiction and Complete Fiction Pictures producing the film.

Principal photography began in May 2018, with Jake Polonsky as cinematographer, beginning with covering the band's concert at the O_{2} Forum Kentish Town. In April 2020, Wright announced that the film was "nearly finished".

== Soundtrack ==
The Sparks Brothers

Soundtrack album by Sparks
- Released: March 2022
- Genres: Art pop; art rock; glam rock; synth-pop; new wave; electronic
- Label: Waxwork
- Producers: Edgar Wright; Ron Mael; Russell Mael

Sparks chronology
Annette (Unlimited Edition) (2021)	The Sparks Brothers (2022)	The Girl Is Crying in Her Latte (2023)

A soundtrack album was released on 4-LP by Waxwork Records in March 2022, as well as a Spotify playlist

=== Track listing ===
Side A
No.	Title	Original album	Length
1.	"Sparks Documentary Film Fanfare"	previously unreleased	0:50
2.	"This Town Ain’t Big Enough For Both Of Us"	Plagiarism	4:03
3.	"Fa La Fa Lee"	Halfnelson/Sparks	2:54
4.	"Slowboat"	Halfnelson/Sparks	3:55
5.	"Wonder Girl"	Halfnelson/Sparks	2:21
6.	"Girl From Germany"	A Woofer in Tweeter's Clothing	3:29
7.	"Talent Is An Asset"	Kimono My House	3:21

Side B
No.	Title	Original album	Length
8.	"This Town Ain’t Big Enough For Both Of Us"	Kimono My House	3:05
9.	"Amateur Hour"	Kimono My House	3:37
10.	"Never Turn Your Back On Mother Earth"	Propaganda	2:28
11.	"Something For The Girl With Everything"	Propaganda	2:16
12.	"Get In The Swing"	Indiscreet	4:08
13.	"Under The Table With Her"	Indiscreet	2:19
14.	"Everybody's Stupid"	Big Beat	3:40

Side C
No.	Title	Original album	Length
15.	"Those Mysteries"	Introducing Sparks	5:01
16.	"La Dolce Vita"	No. 1 in Heaven	5:54
17.	"Beat The Clock"	No. 1 in Heaven	4:24
18.	"The Number One Song In Heaven" (7" Version)	No. 1 in Heaven	3:51

Side D
No.	Title	Original album	Length
19.	"When I'm With You"	Terminal Jive	5:49
20.	"Tips For Teens"	Whomp That Sucker	3:33
21.	"Angst In My Pants"	Angst in My Pants	3:29
22.	"I Predict"	Angst In My Pants	2:54
23.	"Cool Places" (with Jane Wiedlin)	In Outer Space	3:25
24.	"I Wish I Looked A Little Better"	In Outer Space	2:59

Side E
No.	Title	Original album	Length
25.	"Change"	Music That You Can Dance To	5:21
26.	"Music That You Can Dance To"	Music That You Can Dance To	4:24
27.	"The Race For President"	In Entertainment We Trust (Music From The Motion Picture A Cute Candidate)	1:48
28.	"When Do I Get To Sing ‘My Way’"	Gratuitous Sax & Senseless Violins	4:37
29.	"Balls"	Balls	4:24

Side F
No.	Title	Original album	Length
30.	"The Rhythm Thief"	Lil' Beethoven	5:19
31.	"My Baby’s Taking Me Home" (Live in London 2018)	previously unreleased	5:20
32.	"Dick Around"	Hello Young Lovers	6:35
33.	"I Can’t Believe That You Would Fall For All The Crap In This Song"	Exotic Creatures of the Deep	3:54

Side G
No.	Title	Original album	Length
34.	"Johnny Delusional" (performed by FFS)	FFS	3:11
35.	"Edith Piaf (Said It Better Than Me)"	Hippopotamus	4:32
36.	"All That"	A Steady Drip, Drip, Drip	4:44
37.	"The Number One Song In Heaven" (Live 2012)	Two Hands, One Mouth	7:02

Side H
No.	Title	Original album	Length
38.	"Computer Girl"	Past Tense – The Best of Sparks	3:13
39.	"Hospitality On Parade" (Live At Fairfield Halls 1975)	previously unreleased	5:25
40.	"What The Hell Is It This Time?" (Live In London 2018)	previously unreleased	4:12
41.	"‘My Way’ / When Do I Get To Sing ‘My Way’" (Live in London 2018)	previously unreleased	5:51
42.	"Amateur Hour" (Read by Neil Gaiman)	previously unreleased	1:45

== Release ==
The film had its world premiere at the 2021 Sundance Film Festival on January 30, 2021. Shortly after, Focus Features acquired worldwide rights to the film, with its parent Universal Pictures distributing internationally. The film also screened at South by Southwest in March 2021, and was theatrically released in North America on June 18, 2021, by Focus Features. It was released in the United Kingdom on July 30, 2021.

=== Box office ===
In the United States, the film made $107,225 on its opening Friday and $89,652 on its second weekend. It was released internationally in territories including the United Kingdom ($334,184), Australia ($45,404), France ($80,267), Iceland ($477), Portugal ($346) and New Zealand ($9,499).

=== Critical response ===
On Rotten Tomatoes, the film has an approval rating of 96% based on 160 reviews, with an average rating of 7.9/10. The website's critics consensus reads, "Their albums may be cult favorites, but this Edgar Wright-directed documentary offers an introduction to The Sparks Brothers that has something for everyone." On Metacritic, the film has a weighted average score of 80 out of 100, based on reviews from 33 critics, indicating "generally favorable reviews".
