= Now That I Own the BBC =

1994 song by Sparks

Single by Sparks

from the album Gratuitous Sax & Senseless Violins
- Released: 1995 (Europe); February 26, 1996 (UK)
- Genre: Disco-pop; techno-dance
- Length: 3:40
- Label: Logic
- Songwriters: Ron Mael; Russell Mael
- Producers: Ron Mael; Russell Mael

Sparks singles chronology
"When I Kiss You (I Hear Charlie Parker Playing)" (1995)	"Now That I Own the BBC" (1995)	"The Number One Song in Heaven" (1997)

Music video
- "Now That I Own the BBC" on YouTube

"Now That I Own the BBC" is a song by American pop and rock duo Sparks, which was released in Europe in 1995 and the UK in 1996 by Logic Records as the third and final single from their sixteenth studio album, Gratuitous Sax & Senseless Violins (1994). The song was written and produced by Ron Mael and Russell Mael, with additional production by Linus Burdick.

== Background ==
Sparks originally envisioned recording the song using different broadcasting company names in the title and lyrics, and releasing them as singles in their respective countries. In a 1996 interview with VH1, Ron Mael revealed, "We were actually thinking at one point of making this a song that would be different in every single country. It would be NBC for America and BBC for Britain, but at a certain point it got just too overwhelming and RTL doesn't rhyme with anything, so we just kept it as the BBC."

== Critical reception ==
Upon its release as a single in the UK, Dave Jennings of Melody Maker considered "Now That I Own the BBC" to be musically "one of the [duo]'s less memorable disco-pop doodles", but praised the lyrics as "a wonderfully wicked fantasy of revenge for years of unforgivable airplay deprivation" and "a truly magnificent flight of berserk imagination". Pan-European magazine Music & Media wrote, "A happy, perky pop song with that unbeatable absurdist streak of the Mael Brothers. The radio edit slightly resembles their previous single 'When Do I Get to Sing 'My Way'', also featured as a semi-acoustic version. The remix by Scatman producers Tony Catania and Ingo Kays is fun and freaky." The Newark Advertiser described the song as "techno-dance weirdness" and added, "Vocal version and two mindbending instrumental opportunities missed by the insertion of vocal snatches."

== Music video ==
The song's music video features Sparks on board an animated 'BBC ship'. It was directed by Olivier Kuntzel and Florence Deygas, who were also responsible for the video's animation.

In 2024, to mark the 30th anniversary of the parent album, the original music video was released in HD on the band's YouTube channel.

== Track listing ==
=== 1995 European release ===
CD single
No.	Title	Notes	Length
1.	"Now That I Own the BBC"	Sparks Radio Edit	3:53
2.	"Now That I Own the BBC"	BBC-Underworld Mix	5:21
3.	"When Do I Get to Sing 'My Way'"	Live BBC Session - Acoustic Version	3:34
4.	"Now That I Own the BBC"	Live BBC Session - Acoustic Version	1:32

CD promotional limited edition single
No.	Title	Notes	Length
1.	"Now That I Own the BBC"	Radio Mix	4:00
2.	"Now That I Own the BBC"	Extended Vocal Mix	6:00
3.	"When Do I Get to Sing 'My Way'"	Extended Dub Mix	6:00
4.	"Now That I Own the BBC"	Legend B. Mix	5:21

12-inch promotional single (Germany)
No.	Title	Notes	Length
1.	"Now That I Own the BBC"	BBC Underworld Mix	5:21
2.	"Now That I Own the BBC"	Legend B. Remix	5:21

=== 1996 UK release ===
CD single #1
No.	Title	Notes	Length
1.	"Now That I Own the BBC"	Motiv 8 Radio Edit	3:58
2.	"Now That I Own the BBC"	Tony Catania & Ingo Kays Mix	5:21
3.	"Now That I Own the BBC"	Motiv 8 Dub	5:55
4.	"She's an Anchorman"		5:08

CD single #2
No.	Title	Notes	Length
1.	"Now That I Own the BBC"	Sparks Radio Edit	3:53
2.	"Now That I Own the BBC"	Motiv 8 Extended Vocal Mix	6:00
3.	"Now That I Own the BBC"	Legend B. Remix	5:21
4.	"Beat the Clock"	Live in Concert	5:43

Cassette single
No.	Title	Notes	Length
1.	"Now That I Own the BBC"	Motiv 8 Radio Edit	3:58
2.	"Now That I Own the BBC"	Sparks Radio Edit	3:53

12-inch promotional single
No.	Title	Notes	Length
1.	"Now That I Own the BBC"	Tony Catania & Ingo Kays Mix	5:21
2.	"Now That I Own the BBC"	Legend B. Remix	5:24
3.	"Now That I Own the BBC"	Motiv 8 Extended Vocal Mix	6:00
4.	"Now That I Own the BBC"	Motiv 8 Extended Dub Mix	5:55

CD promotional single
No.	Title	Notes	Length
1.	"Now That I Own the BBC"	Motiv 8 Radio Edit	3:58
2.	"Now That I Own the BBC"	Sparks Radio Edit	3:53
3.	"Now That I Own the BBC"	Motiv 8 Extended Vocal Mix	6:00
4.	"Now That I Own the BBC"	Motiv 8 Dub	5:55
5.	"Now That I Own the BBC"	Tony Catania & Ingo Kays Mix	5:21
6.	"Now That I Own the BBC"	Legend B. Remix	5:21

== Charts ==
=== Weekly charts ===
Chart (1995–96)	Peak position
Germany (GfK)	81
Latvia (Latvijas Top 50)	13
Scotland Singles (OCC)	53
UK Singles (OCC)	60
UK Pop Tip Club Chart (Record Mirror)	3

=== Year-end charts ===
Chart (1995)	Position
Latvia (Latvijas Top 50)	111
