= Balls (Sparks album) =

- The cover art for Balls, which originally came out in a variety of colors.

Studio album by Sparks
- Released: August 22, 2000
- Recorded: 1998–1999
- Studio: Sparks Studios, Los Angeles, California
- Genre: Techno; electropop; electronic rock
- Length: 48:45
- Label: Oglio (US); Recognition (UK)
- Producer: Ron Mael; Russell Mael

Sparks chronology
Plagiarism (1997)	Balls (2000)	Lil' Beethoven (2002)

Singles from Balls
- 1. "More than a Sex Machine" Released: September 1999; 2. "The Calm Before the Storm" Released: August 2000; 3. "The Angels" Released: 2000

Balls is the 18th studio album by the American rock duo Sparks, released in 2000.

Balls was a continuation of the techno-pop style that the duo had first explored on 1994's Gratuitous Sax & Senseless Violins, but employed harder, more uptempo beats, as well as a direct, aggressive approach derived from acts such as The Prodigy. The album was packaged in a translucent jewel case that came in a variety of colors (red, yellow, green, blue, orange, black, and turquoise), with a reflective die-cut silver slipcase.

"It's a Knockoff" was recorded for the movie Knock Off starring Jean-Claude Van Damme, directed by the acclaimed Hong Kong–based producer–director Tsui Hark (who had appeared on his own tribute song by the band on Gratuitous Sax & Senseless Violins). It is featured over the closing credits.

Whilst critical reception of Balls was moderately positive, it was not a success in terms of chart performance and failed to match the performance of Gratuitous Sax & Senseless Violins. It did not chart in Germany, the UK, or the US. "More than a Sex Machine", "The Calm Before the Storm", and "The Angels" were released as singles but did not pick up any significant sales or radio play. The duo had already written a follow-up to Balls in a similar vein. However, the album's poor reception convinced them to abandon it and pursue a new direction entirely on 2002's Lil' Beethoven.

== Critical reception ==
Professional ratings
Aggregate scores
Source	Rating
Metacritic	59/100
Review scores
Source	Rating
AllMusic	3/5 stars
Alternative Press	3/5 stars
Mojo	4/5 stars
NME	4/10
Q	2/5 stars
Uncut	8/10

Critical reception to Balls was mixed. Mojo offered a positive summary describing the album as "highly listenable and equally danceable, a kind of Pet Shop Boys meet Gary Numan at the gates of Georgio [sic] Moroder." Bryan Buss of AllMusic rated the album three stars out of five, noting that "This being Sparks' 18th album, the Mael brothers clearly know what they're doing. Though both the lyrics and the production are quirky, there is nothing dumb about them... The melodies have brilliant pop hooks and Russell's voice soars."

Q panned the album describing it as: "a profound disappointment... few songs lift themselves above pedestrian tedium."NME also reviewed the album unfavorably, remarking "age has inexplicably withered Sparks' bow-legged muse; where once was genre-bending acid eclecticism and inspired wit, Sparks now seem content to dole out tired, tinny electro-pop and unfunny puns."

== Re-issues ==
In 2008, Sparks' own record label Lil' Beethoven Records reissued the album in a digipak sleeve, featuring different sleeve art and two bonus tracks, "The Calm Before the Opera" and a full-length instrumental of "The Calm Before the Storm".

In 2022, the album was remastered and released on vinyl for the first time, as part of the "21st Century Sparks" remaster series. CD and digital issues again contained "The Calm Before the Opera" as well as seven new bonus tracks, including alternate versions of songs from Balls, the concert opener "It's a Sparks Show", an unused theme song for the animated series The Oblongs, and music from the Kuntzel+Deygas short film A Cute Candidate. This reissue entered the UK Independent Albums Chart at number 16.

== Track listing ==
All tracks are written by Ron and Russell Mael.

Balls track listing
No.	Title	Length
1.	"Balls"	4:24
2.	"More than a Sex Machine"	5:04
3.	"Scheherazade"	4:29
4.	"Aeroflot"	4:28
5.	"The Calm Before the Storm"	4:03
6.	"How to Get Your Ass Kicked"	4:19
7.	"Bullet Train"	4:20
8.	"It's a Knockoff"	3:42
9.	"Irreplaceable"	5:06
10.	"It's Educational"	4:02
11.	"The Angels"	4:48
Total length:		48:45

Festival Mushroom Records enhanced bonus CD (2000)
No.	Title	Length
12.	"Now That I Own the ABC" (omitted from some editions)	3:56
13.	"Balls" (excerpt from Sparks Live in London)	4:59
14.	"Ron Levitates Baby Leroy" (excerpt from Sparks Live in London)	1:09
15.	"Bullet Train" (excerpt from Sparks Live in London)	5:18
16.	"Beat the Clock" (excerpt from Sparks Live in London)	5:07
17.	"This Town Ain't Big Enough" (Ron Mael; excerpt from Sparks Live in London)	4:49

Lil' Beethoven Records bonus tracks (2008)
No.	Title	Length
12.	"Calm Before the Opera"	3:09
13.	"Calm Before the Storm" (full-length instrumental)	5:03
Total length:		56:57

BMG bonus tracks (2022)
No.	Title	Length
12.	"It's a Sparks Show"	1:20
13.	"Calm Before the Opera"	3:06
14.	"The Angels" (Sparks alternative version)	3:43
15.	"More than a Sex Machine" (Sparks definitive version – radio edit)	3:40
16.	"The Angels" (Tony Visconti version)	3:49
17.	"The Oblongs"	0:57
18.	"A Cute Candidate Opening Theme"	1:59
19.	"The Race for President"	1:50
Total length:		69:09

== Personnel ==
Credits are adapted from the Balls liner notes.

- Russell Mael – vocals, production
- Ron Mael – keyboards, programming, cover concept
- Tammy Glover – drums
- Aksinja Berger – voice on "Aeroflot"
- Amelia Cone – narration on "Scheherazade"
- John Thomas – mixing, engineering

== Charts ==
Chart performance for Balls
Chart (2022)	Peak position
Scottish Albums (OCC)	22
UK Independent Albums (OCC)	16
