= When I Kiss You (I Hear Charlie Parker Playing) =

1995 single by Sparks

Single by Sparks

from the album Gratuitous Sax & Senseless Violins
- Released: February 27, 1995
- Genre: Synth-pop
- Length: 3:49
- Label: Logic
- Songwriters: Ron Mael; Russell Mael
- Producers: Ron Mael; Russell Mael

Sparks singles chronology
"When Do I Get to Sing 'My Way'" (1994)	"When I Kiss You (I Hear Charlie Parker Playing)" (1995)	"Now That I Own the BBC" (1995)

Music video
- "When I Kiss You (I Hear Charlie Parker Playing)" on YouTube

"When I Kiss You (I Hear Charlie Parker Playing)" is a song by American rock band Sparks, released in February 1995, by Logic Records, as the second single from their 16th album, Gratuitous Sax & Senseless Violins (1994). Written and produced by the Mael brothers, it references American jazz saxophonist Charlie Parker. The song peaked at number 36 in the UK, number 61 in Germany and number 24 on the Billboard Hot Dance Club Play chart in the US. Originally it was released as "(When I Kiss You) I Hear Charlie Parker Playing", before being re-named to its present title. Sophie Muller directed the accompanying music video.

== Critical reception ==
Ned Raggett from AllMusic remarked that the song "finds Russell rapping (!)". In his weekly UK chart commentary, James Masterton said, "The new single is as bizarre as the title sounds, featuring a high-speed rapped verse that Neil Tennant would I'm sure give his right arm to have written, coupled with an impressively commercial chorus." The Stud Brothers of Melody Maker viewed it as "a wordy hi-NRG Pet Shop Boys". Pan-European magazine Music & Media wrote, "We're living in the age of fast food Euro with one-liners serving as lyrics. Luckily the Sparks still use their imagination—through a tooth filling the lover here receives a jazz station."

A reviewer from Music Week gave the song a score of four out of five, describing it as "more delicious high camp drama from the kings of eccentric synth pop", and stated that former Suede guitarist Bernard Butler's Fashionable World of Fashion Mix "should create a buzz." Emma Forrest from NME opined, "This sounds like irritating Euro-Pop. A kind of less appealing Yello." Also James Hamilton from the Record Mirror Dance Update viewed it as "Pet Shop Boys-ishly". In his review of Gratuitous Sax & Senseless Violins, Jonathan Bernstein from Spin felt "the sibs are at their most entertaining and least unbearable", opining that titles on tracks like 'When I Kiss You (I Hear Charlie Parker Playing)' "are part of the reason for Spark's continued absence from American airwaves."

== Music video ==
A music video was produced to promote the single, directed by English music video director Sophie Muller. It was C-listed on German music television channel VIVA in June 1995. "When I Kiss You" was later made available on Sparks' official YouTube channel in 2012. Muller had previously directed the video for "When Do I Get to Sing 'My Way'".

In 2024, to mark the 30th anniversary of the parent album, the original music video was released in HD on YouTube along with an alternative Edit, the Morning Version, as well as a video for the Red Jerry Remix.

== Track listings ==
- 7-inch, Europe

A. "When I Kiss You (I Hear Charlie Parker Playing)" (Radio Edit) – 3:47
B. "When I Kiss You (I Hear Charlie Parker Playing)" (The Beatmasters Radio Edit) – 3:58

- 12-inch, US

A1. "When I Kiss You (I Hear Charlie Parker Playing)" (Red Jerry Remix) – 6:45
A2. "When I Kiss You (I Hear Charlie Parker Playing)" (Color Blind Club) – 7:35
B1. "When I Kiss You (I Hear Charlie Parker Playing)" (DJ Casanova's Saturday Nite at Palladium Vocal Mix) – 6:07
B2. "When I Kiss You (I Hear Charlie Parker Playing)" (DJ Casanova's Saturday Nite at Palladium Dub I) – 6:07
B3. "When I Kiss You (I Hear Charlie Parker Playing)" (Radio Edit) – 3:47

- CD single, UK
1. "When I Kiss You (I Hear Charlie Parker Playing)" (Radio Edit) – 3:47
2. "When I Kiss You (I Hear Charlie Parker Playing)" (Red Jerry Remix) – 6:45
3. "When I Kiss You (I Hear Charlie Parker Playing)" (When I Dub You) – 5:10
4. "When I Kiss You (I Hear Charlie Parker Playing)" (Oliver Lieb Dub Mix I) – 7:17
5. "When I Kiss You (I Hear Charlie Parker Playing)" (Oliver Lieb Dub Mix II) – 7:46
- CD maxi, Europe
1. "When I Kiss You (I Hear Charlie Parker Playing)" (Radio Edit) – 3:49
2. "When I Kiss You (I Hear Charlie Parker Playing)" (Oliver Lieb Vocal Mix) – 7:16
3. "When I Kiss You (I Hear Charlie Parker Playing)" (Bernard Butler's Fashionable World of Fashion Mix) – 7:07
4. "When I Kiss You (I Hear Charlie Parker Playing)" (Beatmasters Dub Mix) – 5:10
5. "When I Kiss You (I Hear Charlie Parker Playing)" (Acappella) – 4:04
- CD maxi (The Remix Issue), Europe
1. "When I Kiss You (I Hear Charlie Parker Playing)" (Radio Edit) – 3:47
2. "When I Kiss You (I Hear Charlie Parker Playing)" (The Beatmasters' Radio Edit) – 3:54
3. "When I Kiss You (I Hear Charlie Parker Playing)" (Red Jerry Mix) – 6:51
4. "When I Kiss You (I Hear Charlie Parker Playing)" (Hysterie Mix) – 5:50
5. "When I Kiss You (I Hear Charlie Parker Playing)" (Oliver Lieb Instrumental) – 7:42
6. "When I Kiss You (I Hear Charlie Parker Playing)" (Ravers Nature Mix) – 5:10
- CD maxi (Remix), US
1. "When I Kiss You (I Hear Charlie Parker Playing)" (Radio Edit) – 3:47
2. "When I Kiss You (I Hear Charlie Parker Playing)" (Bernard Butler's Edit) – 4:02
3. "When I Kiss You (I Hear Charlie Parker Playing)" (Red Jerry Remix) – 6:45
4. "When I Kiss You (I Hear Charlie Parker Playing)" (Color Blind Club) – 7:35
5. "When I Kiss You (I Hear Charlie Parker Playing)" (DJ Casanova's Saturday Nite at Palladium Vocal Mix) – 6:07
6. "When I Kiss You (I Hear Charlie Parker Playing)" (DJ Casanova's Saturday Nite at Palladium Dub I) – 6:07
- Cassette, UK
1. "When I Kiss You (I Hear Charlie Parker Playing)" (Radio Edit) – 3:47
2. "When I Kiss You (I Hear Charlie Parker Playing)" (The Beatmasters' Radio Edit) – 3:58

== Charts ==
=== Weekly charts ===
Chart (1995)	Peak position
Germany (GfK)	61
Israel (Israeli Singles Chart)	13
Scottish Singles Sales (Official Charts)	38
UK Singles (Official Charts)	36
UK Club Chart (Music Week)	63
UK Pop Tip Club Chart (Music Week)	16
US Dance Club Songs (Billboard)	24

=== Year-end charts ===
Chart (1995)	Position
Latvia (Latvijas Top 50)	114
