= Plagiarism (Sparks album) =

Studio album by Sparks
- Released: 1997
- Studio: Sparks Studios, Los Angeles; CTS Studios, London; Coast Recorders, San Francisco; RAK Studios, London
- Length: 74:17
- Label: Oglio; Roadrunner
- Producer: Ron Mael; Russell Mael; Faith No More; Erasure

Sparks chronology
Gratuitous Sax & Senseless Violins (1994)	Plagiarism (1997)	Balls (2000)

Singles from Plagiarism
- 1. "The Number One Song in Heaven" Released: October 18, 1997; 2. "This Town Ain't Big Enough for Both of Us (with Faith No More)" Released: December 6, 1997

Professional ratings
Review scores
Source	Rating
Allmusic	3/5 stars
Uncut	5/5 stars

Plagiarism is the 17th studio album by American rock duo Sparks. It is a tribute album of sorts featuring new alternate versions of some of their best known songs. It was the duo’s first collaboration with producer Tony Visconti since their 1975 album Indiscreet.

== Release ==
Plagiarism was not successful across Europe like its predecessor Gratuitous Sax & Senseless Violins and did not chart significantly in any territory. The two singles performed well enough to register in the lower regions of the UK Singles Chart. The first single from the album, "The Number One Song in Heaven", included the vocals of Jimmy Somerville and reached #70 in October 1997. Remixes of the single reached the US Billboard Hot Dance Music/Club Play chart (and currently their final entry) in 1999 at #28. The second single, "This Town Ain't Big Enough for Both of Us", did better, and was buoyed by the presence of Faith No More; it peaked at #40 (and remains Sparks last UK top 40 single to date) in December 1997.

== Track listing ==
All tracks are written by Ron and Russell Mael, except where noted.

No.	Title	Writer(s)	Originally from	Length
1.	"Pulling Rabbits Out of a Hat"		Pulling Rabbits Out of a Hat (1984)	3:36
2.	"This Town Ain't Big Enough for Both of Us"	Ron Mael	Kimono My House (1974)	4:03
3.	"The No. 1 Song in Heaven (Part Two)"	Ron and Russell Mael; Giorgio Moroder	Nº 1 in Heaven (1979)	4:06
4.	"Funny Face"		Whomp That Sucker (1981)	5:11
5.	"When Do I Get to Sing 'My Way'"		Gratuitous Sax & Senseless Violins (1994)	5:44
6.	"Angst in My Pants"		Angst in My Pants (1982)	5:19
7.	"Change"		Music That You Can Dance To (1986)	5:26
8.	"Popularity"		In Outer Space (1983)	4:21
9.	"Something for the Girl with Everything"	Ron Mael	Propaganda (1974)	2:52
10.	"This Town Ain't Big Enough for Both of Us" (with Faith No More)	Ron Mael	Kimono My House (1974)	3:00
11.	"Beat the Clock"		Nº 1 in Heaven (1979)	4:30
12.	"Big Brass Ring"		Interior Design (1988)	4:20
13.	"Amateur Hour" (with Erasure)	Ron Mael	Kimono My House (1974)	3:35
14.	"Propaganda"	Ron Mael	Propaganda (1974)	2:35
15.	"When I'm with You"		Terminal Jive (1980)	4:06
16.	"Something for the Girl with Everything" (with Faith No More)	Ron Mael	Propaganda (1974)	3:15
17.	"Orchestral Collage"	Ron and Russell Mael; Giorgio Moroder		0:24
18.	"The No. 1 Song in Heaven" (with Jimmy Somerville)	Ron and Russell Mael; Giorgio Moroder	Nº 1 in Heaven (1979)	5:19
19.	"Never Turn Your Back on Mother Earth"	Ron Mael	Propaganda (1974)	2:35
Total length:				74:17

== Personnel ==
- Russell Mael – vocals, production, mixing
- Ron Mael – keyboards, production
- Metro Voices – vocal backing on "Pulling Rabbits Out of a Hat", "When Do I Get to Sing 'My Way'", "The Number One Song in Heaven", and "Never Turn Your Back on Mother Earth"
- Dean Menta – guitar on "Funny Face"
- Tony Visconti – orchestral, choral arrangements, and conducting on "Pulling Rabbits Out of a Hat", "This Town Ain't Big Enough for Both of Us", "When Do I Get to Sing 'My Way'", "Change", "Something for the Girl with Everything", "Propaganda", "The Number One Song in Heaven", and "Never Turn Your Back on Mother Earth"
- John Thomas – mixing
- Greg Penny – mixing
- Eskimos and Egypt – additional production, remix, bass, guitar, and drums on "Angst in My Pants"
- Faith No More – production and performer on "This Town Ain't Big Enough for Both of Us" and "Something for the Girl with Everything"
- Erasure – production and performer on "Amateur Hour"
- Jenny O'Grady and David Porter-Thomas – additional vocals on "Propaganda"
- Jimmy Somerville – performer on "The Number One Song in Heaven"

== Charts ==
"The Number One Song in Heaven"
Chart (1997/99)	Peak Position
Scotland (OCC)	54
UK Singles (OCC)	70
US Dance Club Songs (Billboard)	28

"This Town Ain't Big Enough for Both of Us" (with Faith No More)
Chart (1997)	Peak Position
Scotland (OCC)	39
UK Singles (OCC)	40
