= Mad! =

2025 studio album by Sparks

Studio album by Sparks
- Released: May 23, 2025
- Recorded: 2024
- Studio: Sparks (Los Angeles)
- Genres: Art rock; synth-pop
- Length: 45:45
- Label: Transgressive
- Producers: Ron Mael; Russell Mael

Sparks chronology
Annette – An Opera by Sparks (The Original 2013 Recordings) (2024)	Mad! (2025)	Madder! (2025)

Singles from Mad!
- 1. "Do Things My Own Way" Released: January 30, 2025; 2. "JanSport Backpack" Released: February 25, 2025; 3. "Drowned in a Sea of Tears" Released: April 2, 2025; 4. "My Devotion" Released: May 1, 2025; 5. "A Little Bit of Light Banter" Released: May 21, 2025

Mad! (stylized in all caps) is the 26th studio album by American pop and rock duo Sparks, released on May 23, 2025, through Transgressive Records.

Upon release, the album was met with critical acclaim and continued the group's commercial success in the UK, despite the return to an independent label. Mad! entered the UK Albums Chart at no. 2, the highest in Sparks' career.

== Background and recording ==
During a ceremony at the 2024 AIM Independent Music Awards in which Sparks received the honors of Outstanding Contribution to Music, bandmates Ron and Russell Mael took the opportunity to announce that they had signed to the independent record label Transgressive Records for a new studio album. This followed a continuous period of chart success for the Mael brothers, with Hippopotamus (2017), A Steady Drip, Drip, Drip (2020), and The Girl Is Crying in Her Latte (2023) all peaking at no. 7 on the UK Albums Chart, the highest position since Kimono My House peaked at no. 4 in 1974.

Their first album of original material since leaving Island Records for the second time, Mad! also follows the self-released Annette – An Opera by Sparks (The Original 2013 Recordings) in 2024. In an interview for Mojo magazine, lead vocalist Russell Mael stated that in the wake of a successful world tour promoting The Girl Is Crying in Her Latte, Sparks had begun work on their next studio album, finishing within a six-month span.

== Promotion and singles ==
In anticipation for Mad!, Sparks released five attached singles. The first single, "Do Things My Own Way", was released on January 30, 2025, with the music video premiering five days later. The video was directed by Ambar Navarro, who has also worked with artists such as the Lemon Twigs, Weyes Blood, and John Carpenter. In Beats Per Minute, Joshua Pickard said it "recalls the idiosyncracies of their early work while also highlighting the more populist sounds of their later releases." Sparks released the second single "JanSport Backpack" on February 25, alongside the announcement of the album's release date, cover, and track listing.

On April 2, 2025, Sparks released their third single "Drowned in a Sea of Tears", followed by another music video directed by Ambar Navarro and starring performer Tina Kronis. The song's atypical sincerity is noted in an interview by Variety's Chris Willman where Ron Mael says that while "We do try to have some level of seriousness below the surface of even the song [sic] that are humorous, ... in the traditional definition of what sincerity in a song is, this is more that." On May 1 and 21, the final singles "My Devotion" and "A Little Bit of Light Banter" were respectively released.

On May 25, 2025, just two days after the album's release, Ron and Russell Mael joined comedian and actor Rob Brydon for a ninety-minute interview at Union Chapel, London. Ahead of the promotional event, entitled An Entirely MAD! Conversation Between Rob Brydon and Sparks!, Brydon said that he had been a fan of the duo since being gifted a cassette of Sparks' 1974 album Propaganda for his ninth birthday.

== Release ==
After its release on May 23, 2025, Mad! debuted at no. 2 in the UK and no. 1 on both the Scottish and the UK Independent charts. This represents Sparks' highest UK chart position in their career, beating their previous record of no. 4 with Kimono My House (1974). The weekly charts, which run every Friday, include an additional midweek chart called the "Official Albums Chart Update", which compiles sales from Friday to Sunday. This had Mad!, without the support of a major record label, reach the top position of no. 1, higher than Sparks' previous record of 2020's A Steady Drip, Drip, Drip at no. 4.

== Critical reception ==
Professional ratings
Aggregate scores
Source	Rating
AnyDecentMusic?	7.6/10
Metacritic	82/100
Review scores
Source	Rating
AllMusic	3.5/5 stars
Clash	8/10
The Line of Best Fit	8/10
Louder Than War	4/5 stars
Mojo	4/5 stars
MusicOMH	4/5 stars
Paste	7.6/10
PopMatters	7/10
Record Collector	5/5 stars
The Telegraph	5/5 stars

Mad! received a score of 82/100 on the review aggregator website Metacritic based on 12 critics, which it categorized as "universal acclaim". Another aggregator AnyDecentMusic? gave the album 7.6/10 based on 11 critical reviews.

In a four-star review for Mojo, James McNair said that on the album, the Mael brothers "continue to concoct songs that are distinctively, resolutely Mael. On MAD!, synth-pop, art-rock and a programmed Shostakovich vibe (see paean to Californian interstate highway I-405 Rules) all feed into their skewed, self-contained universe, the arrangements as unpredictable as the subject matter." Robin Murray of Clash thought the album "seems to represent everything special about this period in their work." Rating the album 7.6 out of 10 for Paste, Camyn Teder praised the songs' "unique structures" and satirical outlook, saying they "leave room for the thing that makes songs so great: a mystical ambiguity"; while they believed that Mad! was repetitive at times, they expressed that "this is certainly another feather in the cap for Sparks."

Writing for the magazine Record Collector, Simon Price said in a five-star review that "MAD! enters, and attempts to reflect, a world that is mad in both the American (angry) and British (crazy) senses," citing "a new (or renewed) toughness to the sound" on certain tracks that draw comparisons to their sixth album Big Beat (1976). Christopher Hamilton-Peach of The Line of Best Fit cited "Hit Me Baby" as an example, before concluding "The angular flexes in style and wordplay tied together with Russell's high wire deployment prove as duly consistent a formula as any of the standout entries in the duo's crowded discography." In a four-star review for MusicOMH, John Murphy said, despite minor reservations concerning the repetition in songs such as "Hit Me, Baby" and "Running Up a Tab...", that "By the time the closing track ... comes around, you’ll be mentally reordering your list of top 10 all-time Sparks albums."

=== Year-end lists ===
Publication	List	Rank	Ref.
Classic Pop	The Best of 2025: New Albums	1	
Classic Rock	Top 50 Albums of 2025	34	
Louder Than War	Top 100 Albums of 2025	28	
Record Collector	The Best of 2025: New Albums Top 25	4	
Rough Trade	Albums of the Year 2025	45	
Under the Radar	Top 100 Albums of 2025	97	

== Track listing ==
All tracks are written by Ron and Russell Mael.

Mad! track listing
No.	Title	Length
1.	"Do Things My Own Way"	3:40
2.	"JanSport Backpack"	4:13
3.	"Hit Me, Baby"	3:44
4.	"Running Up a Tab at the Hotel for the Fab"	4:21
5.	"My Devotion"	4:19
6.	"Don't Dog It"	3:19
7.	"In Daylight"	4:11
8.	"I-405 Rules"	3:22
9.	"A Long Red Light"	3:03
10.	"Drowned in a Sea of Tears"	3:21
11.	"A Little Bit of Light Banter"	3:30
12.	"Lord Have Mercy"	4:42
Total length:		45:45

== Personnel ==
Credits adapted from the CD liner notes and Tidal.

Sparks

- Ron Mael – keyboards, synthesizers; programming (tracks 1, 3, 6, 8, 10)
- Russell Mael – vocals

Additional musicians

- Max Whipple – bass (1, 3–4, 6–8, 10–12)
- Eli Pearl – guitar (1, 3–4, 6, 10–12)
- Evan Weiss – guitar (1, 3–4, 10–12)
- Stevie Nistor – drums (4, 11–12)

Technical and design

- Ron Mael – production
- Russell Mael – production, engineering
- Bill Inglot, Dave Schultz – mastering
- Munachi Osegbu – photography
- Galen Johnson – design

== Charts ==
Chart performance for Mad!
Chart (2025)	Peak position
Belgian Albums (Ultratop Wallonia)	159
German Albums (Offizielle Top 100)	48
Scottish Albums (OCC)	1
Swiss Albums (Schweizer Hitparade)	67
UK Albums (Official Charts)	2
UK Album Downloads (OCC)	4
UK Independent Albums (OCC)	1
UK Vinyl Albums (OCC)	1
US Top Album Sales (Billboard)	27

== Madder! ==
Madder!

EP by Sparks
- Released: October 3, 2025
- Recorded: 2025
- Length: 14:52
- Label: Transgressive
- Producers: Ron Mael; Russell Mael

Sparks chronology
Mad! (2025)	Madder! (2025)	Sparks Live on the Moon (2026)

Singles from Madder!
- 1. "Porcupine" Released: September 2, 2025

Madder! (stylized in all caps) is the debut studio extended play by Sparks, released on October 3, 2025, through Transgressive Records. Comprising four tracks, it was intended to be a companion release to their album Mad! and was recorded quickly after the album was released earlier that year. Prior to its official release, physical copies (CD, black vinyl, and picture disc) were made available for purchase to concertgoers attending the North American leg of Sparks' Mad! Tour in September.

=== Single ===
The lead single, "Porcupine", was released on September 2, 2025, alongside the announcement of the EP. The corresponding music video, which arrived days after the single's initial release, stars the musical artist Self Esteem and was directed by Fred Rowson with production by Blink Productions and special effects by Selected Works. Self Esteem later told Uncut magazine that she is "a huge fan" and remained in contact with the duo since the video, saying "It's important to remember that this is a fun job. It's daft, and they really embrace the daft."

=== Critical reception ===
Professional ratings
Review scores
Source	Rating
Classic Rock	8/10 (Note: The Classic Rock magazine review of Madder! gave the EP 8 out of 10, but nearly a week before the issue was published, the magazine previewed the same review on Facebook with a rating of four and a half stars.)

In an 8 out of 10 review for the magazine Classic Rock, Chris Roberts found the opener "Porcupine" to be "a thumping mix of silliness and surrealism that pretty much captures the essence of Sparks", while closer "They" was singled out as the EP's "best track" such that it "slows down to allow Russell's mature-years voice to resonate." In Spin, Madder! was ranked second in its list of the best EPs of 2025.

=== Track listing ===
All tracks are written by Ron and Russell Mael.

Madder! track listing
No.	Title	Length
1.	"Porcupine"	3:45
2.	"Fantasize"	3:23
3.	"Mess Up"	3:13
4.	"They"	4:31
Total length:		14:52

=== Personnel ===
Credits adapted from the 10-inch vinyl liner notes and Tidal.

Sparks

- Ron Mael – keyboards, synthesizers, programming
- Russell Mael – vocals, programming

Additional musicians

- Max Whipple – bass
- Eli Pearl, Evan Weiss – guitar (except track 3)
- Stevie Nistor – drums (1)

Technical and design

- Ron Mael – production
- Russell Mael – production, engineering, mixing
- Bill Inglot, Dave Schultz – mastering
- Munachi Osegbu – photography
- Galen Johnson – design

=== Charts ===
Chart performance for Madder!
Chart (2025)	Peak position
UK Vinyl Singles (OCC) (Note: On the Official Charts Company website, Madder! was credited as its opener "Porcupine" on the Vinyl Singles Chart, evidenced by the catalog number that was provided which matches the standard vinyl release of the EP.)	1
