= Lil' Beethoven =

Studio album by Sparks
- Released: October 14, 2002
- Recorded: 2001–2002
- Studios: Sparks Studios, Los Angeles, California
- Genres: Art pop; chamber pop; neo-classical; glam rock
- Length: 44:36
- Labels: Palm (US); Lil' Beethoven / Artful (UK)
- Producers: Ron Mael; Russell Mael

Sparks chronology
Balls (2000)	Lil' Beethoven (2002)	Hello Young Lovers (2006)

Singles from Lil' Beethoven
- 1. "Suburban Homeboy" b/w "Wunderbar (Concerto In Koch Minor)" Released: March 24, 2003

Lil' Beethoven is the nineteenth studio album by the American rock duo Sparks, released on October 14, 2002. Written and produced by brothers Ron and Russell Mael, the album marked a radical departure from the predominantly electronic, beat-driven sound that characterised much of their work during the 1980s and 1990s.

On Lil' Beethoven, Sparks largely abandoned conventional rhythm in favour of repetitive, loop-based song structures reminiscent of minimalist music. The arrangements employ piano, layered choral vocals, and orchestral textures, with live drums and percussion used sparingly. Despite the album's title and overt references to classical music, including allusions to composer Ludwig van Beethoven, the duo have stated it was not intended to be a 'pseudo-classical' record, but rather an exercise in how big and aggressive they could sound with very basic elements.

Upon its release, Lil' Beethoven received critical acclaim in the UK and the US, who praised its challenging and innovative sound, and helped to bring renewed interest in the band internationally. Sparks took an equally idiosyncratic approach to promoting the album live: the first half of the set consisted of the album performed in its entirety, with the band incorporating performance art and screen projections, followed by a more standard greatest hits set in the second half. Only one single, "Suburban Homeboy", was taken from the album. In 2004, a performance at the Södra Teatern in Stockholm, Sweden was filmed and released on DVD as Lil Beethoven - Live in Stockholm.

== Background ==
By 2002, Sparks had released eighteen albums, the last several of them in the new wave/synthpop vein. While this had been successful, breaking them in the United States with 1983's "Cool Places" and in Germany with "When Do I Get to Sing 'My Way'" in 1995, it had not secured them much critical acclaim or a consistent audience. 1997's Plagiarism, which consisted entirely of new recordings of earlier material, had been intended to introduce the group's back catalog to their new German audience, while building on the success with high-profile collaborations for the UK and US audience. It had only been partially successful.

The next album, Balls, had not been at all successful and was generally perceived as Sparks treading water. The duo had already written an entire album's worth of material for a follow-up, but were unenthusiastic with the results and the project was scrapped.

In 2001, the Maels were commissioned by a German broadcasting company to produce a song for Günther Koch Revisited (Voll In Den Mann), an album that featured samples of sports commentator Günther Koch set to music. The band's contribution, "Wunderbar", looped Koch's highly-spirited exclamations over an orchestral backing. The duo said that making the track provided them a blueprint for the direction that they would take on Lil' Beethoven.

== Recording ==
As has been the case with each Sparks album since 1988's Interior Design, Lil' Beethoven was self-produced by the duo and recorded in Russell Mael's home studio in Los Angeles. The Maels refrained from using drum loops and samples and built up to 75 tracks of vocals and orchestration for each song. Ron Mael stated they packed about "five years' worth of work into one year" and that there were "a lot of dark alleys and false starts" during the recording, which Sparks attributed to having no pre-written material prior to entering the studio. The most crucial change was the elimination of rhythm, replaced with "massive, aggressive" multi-tracked vocals. A Yamaha S80 synthesizer was used to program the orchestral arrangements on Lil' Beethoven, with Ron Mael attributing its built-in arpeggiator as a major component of the sound.

== Sound ==
Described by the band themselves as a "career-defining opus", Lil' Beethoven saw the duo move into a more orchestral sound, with a heavy reliance on repetitive lyrics and piano lines, synthesized instrumentation and multi-tracked vocals in place of percussion, reminiscent of the minimalist works of composers such as John Adams and Steve Reich. Opening track "The Rhythm Thief" serves as a manifesto to the band's new direction by declaring "say goodbye to the beat". "My Baby's Taking Me Home" largely consists of the title repeated over 100 times with no other words being used, other than a spoken interlude. Similarly, "Your Call Is Very Important To Us" uses a corporation style call-hold message: "Your call is very important to us. Please hold" which is then sung with some additional words: "At first she said your call is very important to us, then she said please, please hold." The only other lyrics in the song are "Red light", "Green light", "I'm getting mixed signals" and "Sorry, I'm going to have to put you back on hold". These elements are layered with a simple piano line to create a highly textured effect.

Reflecting on the album's creation, Ron Mael stated it changed the way they approached their songwriting: "The thinking behind that album was we wondered if there was a way to have an aggressive kind of sound that wasn't using guitars. We weren't out to make some sort of pseudo-classical album at all. We had written a lot of songs previous to that that were gonna be our next album, and we kind of felt that maybe we were just going through the motions and that we really had to rethink things. So we went at that album from the start without any songs. We usually go into our studio with songs, at least in some kind of way, but this time we went in just using the instruments and saw what we could come up with. I mean, I know that's the way a lot of people work anyway, but to us, that was new. We were able to then work backwards and figure out vocals that would go with different things.”

== Release ==
Sparks released Lil' Beethoven through their own Lil' Beethoven imprint. In the UK, it was distributed by FullFill, who had ties with Universal Music Group, and was released in a limited edition which had hardcover book binding. In the US, it was distributed by Palm Pictures, the then-company of Island Records founder Chris Blackwell, who had signed Sparks back in 1974. Before the album's official release, the duo had planned to release the album as Entertainment in Extremis, with Lil' Beethoven being the artist's name rather than Sparks, but eventually decided against it.

Lil' Beethoven, while critically acclaimed, did not chart inside the top 100 in the UK, Germany or the US. The album was promoted by the single "Suburban Homeboy" but it, too, did not chart. The single was backed two b-sides, an extended version of "Suburban Homeboy", entitled "Suburban Homeboy (Extended 'Ron Speaks' Version)", and "Wunderbar (Concerto In Koch Minor)", which samples the voice of German sports commentator Günther Koch.

== Re-releases ==
In March 2004, Sparks re-issued Lil' Beethoven in a deluxe edition. This version had a black sleeve as opposed to the white original, and included three audio tracks (two of which were exclusive), a video of "The Rhythm Thief" (directed by long-time collaborators Kuntzel+Deygas), a short film by Ron Mael, and a screensaver. An LP version of the album (which did not include any bonus tracks) was also released at the same time.

A DVD produced by Demon Vision was also released of a live performance of the album. The live performance was filmed in March 2004 at the Södra Teatern in Stockholm, Sweden. The DVD features the album performed in full and in order, followed by a set of twelve other Sparks songs.

In April 2022, a remastered Lil' Beethoven was issued on LP and CD as part of the "21st Century Sparks" collection. The CD included the same bonus tracks as the 2004 reissue and two additional tracks. This time the album charted, entering the UK independent albums top 50 at no. 8.

== Critical reception ==
Professional ratings
Review scores
Source	Rating
AllMusic	4/5 stars

The album was critically applauded, which led to renewed interest in the band. In a review titled "What the world’s been waiting for—Sparks’ very own Kid A", Mojo praised the album as being "an audacious mélange of crafty lyrics and beguilingly repetitive orchestral melodies. Record Collector magazine named the album as one of its Best New Albums of 2002, describing it as "possibly the most exciting and interesting release ever from such a long established act", and later in 2003 saying "it really does feel like one of the best albums ever recorded." In a four out of five star review, AllMusic declared: "it feels like you're listening to another record entirely -- every time you play it. And that is the magic of Lil' Beethoven." When it was released in 2003 in the US, PopMatters wrote that Lil' Beethoven was "brilliant". "It may take a few listens to get there, because this is unlike any record that you're likely to hear this year". In an enthusiastic review, Rolling Stone pictured the album as "nine songs of lethal grandeur built from [...] swollen waves of strings and fistfuls of piano and [...] one-man operatic chorales". Reviewer David Frickle said the album was a "perfect cocktail", remarking that there was virtually no rock guitar apart for one song, before concluding "Trust me: It's not a problem". The List praised it as a "fantastic record", for its "grand symphonic sweep of piano-based orchestral music."

== Track listing ==
All tracks are written by Ron Mael and Russell Mael.

Side one
No.	Title	Length
1.	"The Rhythm Thief"	5:18
2.	"How Do I Get To Carnegie Hall?"	3:50
3.	"What Are All These Bands So Angry About?"	3:32
4.	"I Married Myself"	4:59
5.	"Ride 'Em Cowboy"	4:20

Side two
No.	Title	Length
6.	"My Baby's Taking Me Home"	4:42
7.	"Your Call's Very Important To Us. Please Hold."	4:11
8.	"Ugly Guys With Beautiful Girls"	7:06
9.	"Suburban Homeboy"	2:58

Deluxe edition bonus tracks (2004)
No.	Title	Length
10.	"The Legend Of Lil' Beethoven"	2:06
11.	"Wunderbar (Concerto In Koch Minor)"	3:54
12.	"The Rhythm Thief (Instrumental Version)"	5:24
13.	"The Rhythm Thief" (Video)
14.	"Inspiration Behind Lil' Beethoven: "Fear of a Blank Page"" (Visual)
15.	"Lil' Beethoven Screen Saver"

BMG bonus tracks (2022)
No.	Title	Length
10.	"The Legend Of Lil' Beethoven"	2:06
11.	"Wunderbar (Concerto In Koch Minor)"	3:49
12.	"Kakadu Kantata"	5:19
13.	"Suburban Homeboy (Extended "Ron Speaks" Version)"	3:50
14.	"The Rhythm Thief (Instrumental Version)"	5:21

== Personnel ==
- Russell Mael – vocals, programming, production, arrangements
- Ron Mael – keyboards, orchestrations, programming, production, arrangements
- Tammy Glover – drums, background vocals
- Dean Menta – guitar
- John Thomas – mixing, additional engineering
- Günther Koch – vocals on "Wunderbar"

== DVD ==
Lil' Beethoven – Live in Stockholm

1. "The Rhythm Thief"
2. "How Do I Get to Carnegie Hall?"
3. "What Are All These Bands So Angry About?"
4. "I Married Myself"
5. "Ride 'Em Cowboy"
6. "My Baby's Taking Me Home"
7. "Your Call's Very Important to Us. Please Hold"
8. "Ugly Guys with Beautiful Girls"
9. "Suburban Homeboy"
10. "It's a Sparks Show"
11. "National Crime Awareness Week"
12. "Here in Heaven"
13. "The Number One Song in Heaven"
14. "Nothing to Do"
15. "The Calm Before the Storm"
16. "The Ghost of Liberace"
17. "Talent Is an Asset"
18. "Hospitality on Parade"
19. "When I Kiss You (I Hear Charlie Parker Playing)"
20. "This Town Ain't Big Enough for Both of Us"
21. "When Do I Get to Sing 'My Way'?"
22. "Amateur Hour"

Special features

1. "The Legend of Lil' Beethoven"
2. Soundcheck
3. Backstage with Sparks
4. Audience interviews / Meet the Fans
5. Sparks facts

Live personnel

- Russell Mael – vocals
- Ron Mael – keyboards
- Tammy Glover – drums, timpani, percussion and backing vocals
- Dean Menta – guitar, timpani and backing vocals

== Charts ==
Chart performance for Lil' Beethoven
Chart (2022)	Peak position
Scottish Albums (Official Charts)	13
UK Independent Albums (Official Charts)	8
