= Beat the Clock (song) =

Single by Sparks

from the album Nº 1 in Heaven
- Released: July 1979
- Recorded: 1979
- Genre: Disco; synth-pop
- Length: 4:24; 3:49 (7" edit)
- Label: Virgin
- Songwriters: Ron Mael; Russell Mael
- Producer: Giorgio Moroder

Sparks singles chronology
"Tryouts for the Human Race" (1979)	"Beat the Clock" (1979)	"When I'm with You" (1980)

Music video
- "Beat the Clock" on YouTube

"Beat the Clock" is a song by American pop and rock duo Sparks. Produced by famed disco producer Giorgio Moroder, it was released as the fourth single from the band's eighth studio album Nº 1 in Heaven (1979).

The song peaked at number 10 in August 1979 and spent six weeks on the UK singles chart. It was their third and final top ten single in the UK.

== Background ==
The song was taken from the duo's eighth studio album Nº 1 in Heaven and was produced by Giorgio Moroder. During the late 1970s he was one of the premier producers, his working relationship grew from Sparks' appreciation of Donna Summer's dynamic 1977 song "I Feel Love" which Moroder co-wrote and co-produced.

The 12" remix was the first of the group's extended remixes. The remix utilized the drum pattern from the songs midsection and added a new keyboard melody line during the chorus. The "long version" as it was dubbed was edited to three and a half minutes and released as the B-side to the 7" single. Long versions of "The Number One Song in Heaven" and "Tryouts for the Human Race"—both singles from the same album as "Beat the Clock"—were merely the standard album versions.

An additional B-side on 12" versions was a commercial promoting the album No. 1 in Heaven, which featured clips of most of the tracks. The advert was narrated by English comedian Peter Cook. 12" versions came as colored picture discs, the inner 7" was a picture disc while the outer 5" came in a variety of differing colors such as blue, pink, green, yellow, orange and red.

The song was subsequently reworked for Sparks' 17th studio album Plagiarism (1997), and a live version was released as a B-side on the UK CD single "Now That I Own the BBC" in February 1996.

== Track listing ==
7 inch Virgin VS270

1. "Beat the Clock" – 3:49
2. "Beat the Clock" (alternative mix) – 3:32

12 inch Virgin VS27012

1. "Beat the Clock" – 3:49
2. "Untitled Commercial"
3. "Beat the Clock" (long version) – 6:43

== Chart positions ==
Chart (1979)	Peak position
UK Singles Chart	10
Belgium (Ultratop 50 Flanders)	10
Netherlands (Dutch Top 40)	16

== Personnel ==
Sparks

- Ron Mael – keyboards, synthesizer, vocals
- Russell Mael – vocals

Additional musicians

- Chris Bennett – backing vocals
- Keith Forsey – drums
- Jack Moran – backing vocals
- Giorgio Moroder – synthesizer
- Dan Wyman – synthesizer programming
- Dennis Young – backing vocals
