= Gratuitous Sax & Senseless Violins =

Studio album by Sparks
- Released: November 15, 1994
- Studio: Sparks Studios, Los Angeles, California
- Genre: Eurodance; synth-pop; house; techno
- Length: 44:57
- Label: Logic
- Producer: Ron Mael; Russell Mael

Sparks chronology
| Interior Design (1988) | Gratuitous Sax & Senseless Violins (1994) | Plagiarism (1997) |

Singles from Gratuitous Sax & Senseless Violins
- 1. "When Do I Get to Sing 'My Way'" Released: October 1994; 2. "When I Kiss You (I Hear Charlie Parker Playing)" Released: March 1995; 3. "Now That I Own the BBC" Released: 1995

Professional ratings
Review scores
| Source | Rating |
|---|---|
| AllMusic | 4.5/5 stars |
| Cash Box | (favorable) |
| Encyclopedia of Popular Music | 4/5 stars |
| Knoxville News Sentinel | 3/5 stars |
| Melody Maker | (favorable) |
| NME | 7/10 |
| Spin | (favorable) |

Gratuitous Sax & Senseless Violins is the 16th studio album by American rock band Sparks. It was released in 1994, after an absence from the music industry of 6 years, and marked the duo's transition into a more techno/Eurobeat-influenced sound, which earned them popularity in Germany.

== History ==
Sparks' previous album was released in 1988, and while it scored a couple of club hits in the US, had not been commercially successful. Critically the group had been receiving mixed reviews since their 1984 album Pulling Rabbits Out of a Hat. While promoting Interior Design, Sparks banded together with the French duo Les Rita Mitsouko and released the single "Singing in the Shower" which was a moderate hit in France. Sparks then went on a temporary hiatus while the brothers spent the late 1980s and early 1990s concentrating on film-making, particularly an attempt to make a Japanese manga series, Mai, the Psychic Girl, into a film. They had hoped to have Tsui Hark direct with the actress-musician Christi Haydon voicing the lead character. Russell Mael had initially met Haydon when he admired her look while she was working on the cosmetics counter of a department store. Haydon's only experience at the time had been as a long running extra of the TV show Star Trek: The Next Generation. Despite interest from Tim Burton and six years' work on the project, it came to nothing.

In 1993, Sparks returned to the studio and released the stand-alone single "National Crime Awareness Week", and wrote and produced the single "Katharine Hepburn" for Christi Haydon. Gratuitous Sax & Senseless Violins followed in November the next year. It was produced by the duo without an additional backing band. The album had a sound that returned towards the European-synthesizer orientated sound of No. 1 In Heaven. However, the songs retained an emphasis on pop song structure and a sound that was only slightly removed from that of Pet Shop Boys.. The album was toured with Christi Haydon complementing the brothers on drums, as well as appearing in videos for the group. The a cappella title track "Gratuitous Sax" looked back to the equally brief opener of the band's 1974 album; Propaganda. "When Do I Get to Sing 'My Way'" makes reference to Frank Sinatra's signature-tune "My Way".

== Release ==
Gratuitous Sax & Senseless Violins became Sparks most successful album in Germany reaching No. 29 and scored three hits on the German Singles chart. While the album only reached No. 150 on the UK Albums Chart, the singles did well enough to return the group to the Top 40, the first time since "Beat the Clock" in 1979. The lead single "When Do I Get to Sing 'My Way'" made No. 7 in Germany and No. 38 in the UK (it was re-released in May 1995 and peaked at No. 32). The second single "When I Kiss You (I Hear Charlie Parker Playing)" reached No. 61 in Germany and No. 36 in the UK. The final single "Now That I Own the BBC" did less well making No. 81 in Germany and No. 60 in the UK.

"When Do I Get to Sing 'My Way'" and "When I Kiss You (I Hear Charlie Parker Playing)" managed to chart across Europe, and recommenced Sparks' popularity on the US Billboard Hot Dance Music/Club Play chart, where they reached No. 9 and No. 24.

== Critical reception ==
Simon Price from Melody Maker praised the album, writing, "A fountain, a For 'eyn of a record."

== Re-releases ==
Japanese editions of the album included a new mix "When I Kiss You (I Hear Charlie Parker Playing) by Bernard Butler as a bonus track. The album was re-released as the first album in the series Sparks – The Collection in 2006 on the groups' own record label Lil' Beethoven Records. This re-release featured new artwork, additional sleeve-notes and was packaged in a digipak-sleeve. The album was re-released again in 2019 by BMG Rights Management, in which the original album was remastered and included an additional 31 tracks.

== Track listing ==
All tracks are written by Ron Mael and Russell Mael unless otherwise noted.

Original track listing
| No. | Title | Length |
|---|---|---|
| 1. | "Gratuitous Sax" | 0:31 |
| 2. | "When Do I Get to Sing 'My Way'" | 4:37 |
| 3. | "(When I Kiss You) I Hear Charlie Parker Playing" | 5:13 |
| 4. | "Frankly, Scarlett, I Don't Give a Damn" | 5:03 |
| 5. | "I Thought I Told You to Wait in the Car" | 4:20 |
| 6. | "Hear No Evil, See No Evil, Speak No Evil" | 5:37 |
| 7. | "Now That I Own the BBC" | 4:58 |
| 8. | "Tsui Hark" (feat. Tsui Hark & Bill Kong) | 4:31 |
| 9. | "The Ghost of Liberace" | 4:15 |
| 10. | "Let's Go Surfing" | 5:02 |
| 11. | "Senseless Violins" | 0:50 |
| Total length: | | 44:57 |

Japanese bonus track
| No. | Title | Length |
|---|---|---|
| 12. | "(When I Kiss You) I Hear Charlie Parker Playing" (Bernard Butler's Fashionable World of Fashion Mix) | 7:17 |
| Total length: | | 52:14 |

=== 2019 BMG Remastered and Expanded Edition ===
CD 2: Remixes / B-sides / Official Releases
| No. | Title | Notes | Length |
|---|---|---|---|
| 1. | "National Crime Awareness Week" (Complete Psycho) | | 5:17 |
| 2. | "When Do I Get to Sing 'My Way'" (The Grid Radio Edit) | | 4:09 |
| 3. | "(When I Kiss You) I Hear Charlie Parker Playing" (Bernard Butler's Fashionable World of Fashion Mix) | | 7:06 |
| 4. | "Now That I Own the BBC" (Live Acoustic Version) | Live on BBC Radio One on Simon Mayo's morning show, October 28, 1994 | 1:32 |
| 5. | "When Do I Get to Sing "My Way"" (Vince Clarke Remix) | | 4:38 |
| 6. | "She's an Anchorman" | | 5:08 |
| 7. | "Little Drummer Boy" | Written by Harry Simeone, Katherine Kennicott Davis, and Henry Onorati | 3:03 |
| 8. | "Beat the Clock" (Live in Concert) | Live at the Shepherd's Bush Empire, London, November 17, 1994 | 5:43 |
| 9. | "National Crime Awareness Week" (13 Minutes in Heaven) | | 13:05 |
| 10. | "When Do I Get to Sing 'My Way'" (Sticks & Stones Remix) | | 6:20 |
| 11. | "(When I Kiss You) I Hear Charlie Parker Playing" (The Beatmasters' Full-Blown Dub) | | 5:34 |
| 12. | "Now That I Own the BBC" (Motiv 8 Extended Vocal Mix) | | 6:02 |
| 13. | "When Do I Get To Sing "My Way"" (Pro-Gress Mix) | | 4:36 |
| 14. | "National Crime Awareness Week" (The Janet Leigh Mix) | | 5:49 |
| Total length: | | | 78:02 |

CD 3: Demos & Unreleased Tracks — Demos
| No. | Title | Notes | Length |
|---|---|---|---|
| 1. | "Where Did I Leave My Halo?" | | 3:24 |
| 2. | "She's Beautiful (So What)" | | 3:40 |
| 3. | "Mid-Atlantic" | | 3:33 |
| 4. | "The Farmer's Daughter" | Previously released in Japan | 4:02 |
| 5. | "This Angry Young Man (Ain't Angry No More)" | | 4:28 |
| 6. | "Bob Hope" | | 3:41 |
| 7. | "She's An Anchorman" | | 4:54 |
| 8. | "Love Can Conquer All" | Previously released in Japan | 4:26 |
| 9. | "That's What I Call Paradise" | | 5:27 |
| 10. | "This Angry Young Man (Ain't Angry No More)" (Ron Vocal Version) | | 2:11 |
| 11. | "Mid-Atlantic" (Ron Vocal Version) | | 3:28 |
| 12. | "That's Entertainment" (feat. Les Bohem) | Vocals by Les Bohem | 2:46 |

CD 3: Demos & Unreleased Tracks — Christi Haydon EP All vocals by Christi Haydon
| No. | Title | Writer(s) | Length |
|---|---|---|---|
| 13. | "Katharine Hepburn" | | 5:04 |
| 14. | "Titanic" | | 4:42 |
| 15. | "Othello" | | 4:02 |
| 16. | "Holiday" | Barry Gibb · Robin Gibb | 3:43 |
| 17. | "Boris the Spider" | John Entwistle | 3:43 |
| Total length: | | | 67:14 |

== Personnel ==
- Russell Mael – vocals, production
- Ron Mael – keyboards, production
- Tsui Hark and Bill Kong – guest vocals on "Tsui Hark"
- John Thomas – additional engineering and mixing
- Steve Bates – additional engineering and mixing
- Mark Stagg (for Pro-Gress and D.E.F.) – additional production on "(When I Kiss You) I Hear Charlie Parker Playing", "I Thought I Told You to Wait in the Car" and "Let's Go Surfing"
- Alan Fisch – engineering on "(When I Kiss You) I Hear Charlie Parker Playing" and "I Thought I Told You To Wait in the Car"
- Linus Burdick – additional production on "Now That I Own the BBC", "Hear No Evil, See No Evil, Speak No Evil" and "Let's Go Surfing"

== Charts ==
=== Album ===
Original release
| Country/Region (1994/5) | Peak position |
|---|---|
| German Albums (Offizielle Top 100) | 29 |
| Hungarian Albums (MAHASZ) | 35 |
| UK Albums (OCC) | 150 |

2019 expanded edition
| Country/Region (2019) | Peak position |
|---|---|
| Scottish Albums (OCC) | 45 |
| UK Independent Albums (OCC) | 11 |

=== Singles ===
"When Do I Get to Sing 'My Way'"
| Chart (1994/5) | Peak Position |
|---|---|
| Belgium (Ultratop 50 Flanders) | 16 |
| Belgium (Ultratop 50 Wallonia) | 12 |
| Germany (GfK) | 7 |
| Netherlands (Single Top 100) | 35 |
| Netherlands (Dutch Top 40) (Note: "When Do I Get to Sing 'My Way'" peaked at no. 8 on the Dutch Top 40 Tipparade, which measures songs that fall below the threshold of a top 40 hit.) | 48 |
| Scotland Singles (OCC) | 41 |
| Scotland Singles (OCC); 1995 re-issue | 35 |
| Switzerland (Schweizer Hitparade) | 22 |
| UK Singles (OCC) | 38 |
| UK Singles (OCC); 1995 re-issue | 32 |
| US Dance Club Songs (Billboard) | 9 |

"(When I Kiss You) I Hear Charlie Parker Playing"
| Chart (1995) | Peak Position |
|---|---|
| Germany (GfK) | 61 |
| Scotland Singles (OCC) | 38 |
| UK Singles (OCC) | 36 |
| US Dance Club Songs (Billboard) | 24 |

"Now That I Own the BBC"
| Chart (1995/6) | Peak Position |
|---|---|
| Germany (GfK) | 81 |
| Scotland Singles (OCC) | 53 |
| UK Singles (OCC) | 60 |

"Let's Go Surfing"
| Chart (2019–2023) | Peak Position |
|---|---|
| Scotland Singles (OCC) | 87 |
| UK Physical Singles (OCC) | 6 |
