= When Do I Get to Sing 'My Way' =

1994 single by Sparks

- One of artwork variants for the original 1994 release

Single by Sparks

from the album Gratuitous Sax & Senseless Violins
- Released: October 17, 1994
- Genre: Eurodisco; trance; hi-NRG; synth-pop
- Length: 4:37 (album version); 3:45 (single edit)
- Label: Logic; BMG
- Songwriters: Ron Mael; Russell Mael
- Producers: Ron Mael; Russell Mael

Sparks singles chronology
"National Crime Awareness Week" (1992)	"When Do I Get to Sing 'My Way'" (1994)	"When I Kiss You (I Hear Charlie Parker Playing)" (1995)

Music video
- "When Do I Get to Sing 'My Way'" on YouTube

"When Do I Get to Sing 'My Way'" is a song by American pop duo Sparks, released on October 17, 1994, by Logic Records, as the first single from their sixteenth studio album, Gratuitous Sax & Senseless Violins (1994). Written and produced by brothers Russell and Ron Mael of Sparks, the song references Frank Sinatra's 1969 signature song "My Way" and was a number-seven hit in Germany. In the United States, it reached number nine on the Billboard Dance Club Play chart, and it was also a top 40 hit in the United Kingdom. The song was re-released the following year, this time peaking at number 32 on the UK singles chart. Its accompanying music video was directed by Sophie Muller, depicting the band in a 1940s black-and-white Hollywood film noir style.

== Chart performance ==
"When Do I Get to Sing 'My Way'" was a hit on the chart in several European countries, reaching the top 10 in Germany, where it peaked at number seven. It is also their highest charting single in Germany. Additionally, it peaked within the top 20 in Belgium (12) and Finland (17), and the top 30 in Switzerland (22). In the UK, the single was reissued on May 1, 1995, and peaked at number 32 in its second run on the UK singles chart, on May 14. On the European Hot 100 Singles, it reached number 49 in March 1995. Outside Europe, it was successful on the US Billboard Dance Club Play chart, where it peaked at number nine and in Israel, where it reached number seven.

== Critical reception ==
Ned Raggett from AllMusic complimented the song as an "surging, well-deserved European smash hit", stating that the Mael brothers "gleefully embraced the modern synth/house/techno explosion for their own purposes (an explosion which, after all, they had helped start with their work during the late '70s with Giorgio Moroder)." Upon the release, Larry Flick from Billboard magazine stated that the song "will provide hours of joy for hi-NRG purists with its sugar-sweet melody, rapid syncopated beats, and cheeky chorus." He also noted that Sparks "sound completely comfortable within the context of this deliciously dramatic anthem", adding that its "clever, eye-winking words are warbled with a cooing falsetto over a festive, trance-carpeted hi-NRG groove." Chuck Campbell from Knoxville News Sentinel wrote, "There's sad irony and a bit of a wink in that line [...], a Pet Shop Boys/Erasure-sounding song. For those either unfamiliar with or only vaguely aware of the act (and they far outnumber those who know very much about it), Sparks' Ron and Russell Mael were the forerunners to Britain's Pet Shop Boys and Erasure. This way IS their way."

A reviewer from Liverpool Echo described it as a "chirpy, melodic disco track with its tongue in its cheek", noting that it "even mentions Sid Vicious." Howard Cohen from Herald-Journal said the tune "features a great hook, a throbbing dance pulse and lush harmonizing. Think the Pet Shop Boys gone silly, or Erasure with warmth." In his weekly UK chart commentary, James Masterton felt it's "probably the most glorious sight seen in the charts for a long time." He concluded that "When Do I Get to Sing 'My Way'" is "as classic a record as they have ever made", and "a record that is better than anything those two have made in ages." John Robb from Melody Maker called it "a bubbling Eurodisco mush". Pan-European magazine Music & Media found that it has them "sounding like a cross between Alphaville and Pet Shop Boys." Music & Media editor Robbert Tilli deemed it "a clear compromise to musical tastes of both original fans and today's trendy kids." More critically, Simon Williams of NME wrote: "Sadly, it is now '94, not '74, and lines like When do I get to feel like Sid Vicious felt? aside, the words 'toss', 'on' and 'toast' spring not unreasonably to mind when enduring this thin, tinny cheesy nibble soiling the gastronomic feast of life."

== Music video ==
The music video for "When Do I Get to Sing 'My Way'" was directed by English music video director Sophie Muller and made as a 1940s film noir tale of jealousy and lust. It was produced by Rob Small for Oil Factory and released along with the single on October 17, 1994. Tilli of Music & Media commented, "Witty as ever, the video in a '40s Hollywood style has instantly been slung into rotation on German video outlet VIVA, which was directly countered by its competitor MTV Europe with a live performance in the "Most Wanted" show." "When Do I Get to Sing 'My Way'" was A-listed on VIVA in February 1995. It also received active rotation on MTV Europe same month. In 2024, to mark the 30th anniversary of the parent album, the original music video was released in HD on the band's YouTube channel as well as a previously unseen music video for the Grid radio edit. The video for the Grid version has an alternative ending. Muller also directed the video for the band's next single, "When I Kiss You (I Hear Charlie Parker Playing)".

== Impact and legacy ==
In 2020, Treblezine included "When Do I Get to Sing 'My Way'" in their "A History of Synth-Pop in 50 Essential Tracks", writing, "Rarely declining a chance to inflict a puncture wound in grandeur's rib cage, Sparks delivered an unforeseeably moving synth-pop response to the most narcissistic pop anthem in music history (not counting 'I'm Too Sexy', which was an intentional joke). Mirroring 'My Way''s catalog of hard-won victories, Russell Mael counts off a rash of difficult close losses and mild humiliations with clever, but not mocking, anguish. Mael reflects on the un-specialness of it all over a consistent electro-pulse: "Sign your name with an X, mow the lawn." What reads as a self-aware joke on paper winds up being a far-reaching realization, more universal than its source material, and one of Sparks' all-time best songs. Regrets, you'll have a ton. In 2025, British music magazine Classic Pop ranked it number 19 in their list of "Top 20 Comeback Singles".

American alternative rock band Redd Kross covered the song in 2019. Ron Mael, a fan of Redd Kross, said, "To do a version of that song with a completely different musical approach from the original while keeping every ounce of the original sentiment was an amazing feat. I love it!"

== Track listing ==
- CD single, UK
1. "When Do I Get to Sing 'My Way'" (Sparks radio edit) – 3:45
2. "When Do I Get to Sing 'My Way'" (Vince Clarke remix) – 4:37
3. "When Do I Get to Sing 'My Way'" (Vince Clarke extended mix) – 5:24
4. "When Do I Get to Sing 'My Way'" (Pro-Gress Mix V.10.3) – 7:58
5. "When Do I Get to Sing 'My Way'" (Microbots) – 5:38

== Charts ==
=== Weekly charts ===
Chart (1994)	Peak Position
Israel (Israeli Singles Chart)	7
Scottish Singles Sales (Official Charts)	41
UK Singles (Official Charts)	38
UK Club Chart (Music Week)	50

Chart (1995)	Peak Position
Australia (ARIA)	219
Belgium (Ultratop 50 Flanders)	16
Belgium (Ultratop 50 Wallonia)	12
Europe (Eurochart Hot 100)	49
Europe (European Dance Radio)	9
Finland (Suomen virallinen lista)	17
Germany (GfK)	7
Netherlands (Dutch Top 40 Tipparade)	8
Netherlands (Single Top 100)	35
Scottish Singles Sales (Official Charts)	35
Switzerland (Schweizer Hitparade)	22
UK Singles (Official Charts)	32
UK Club Chart (Music Week)	51
UK Pop Tip Club Chart (Music Week)	40
US Dance Club Songs (Billboard)	9

=== Year-end charts ===
Chart (1995)	Position
Belgium (Ultratop 50 Wallonia)	55
Germany (Media Control)	33
Latvia (Latvijas Top 50)	69

== Certifications ==
Region	Certification	Certified units/sales
Germany (BVMI)	Gold	250,000^{^}
^{^} Shipments figures based on certification alone.

== Release history ==
Region	Date	Format(s)	Label(s)	Ref.
United Kingdom	October 17, 1994	12-inch vinyl; CD; cassette	Logic; BMG	
Australia	January 23, 1995	CD; cassette	Logic; BMG	
United Kingdom (re-release)	May 1, 1995	CD; cassette	Logic; BMG	
Japan	May 24, 1995	Mini-CD	Logic; BMG	
