= The Number One Song in Heaven =

Single by Sparks

from the album Nº 1 in Heaven
- Released: March 23, 1979
- Recorded: 1979
- Genre: Synth-pop; disco; hi-NRG
- Length: 7:26
- Label: Virgin (1979); Roadrunner (1997)
- Songwriters: Ron Mael; Russell Mael; Giorgio Moroder
- Producer: Giorgio Moroder

Sparks singles chronology
"La Dolce Vita" (1979)	"The Number One Song in Heaven" (1979)	"Tryouts for the Human Race" (1979)

Music video
- "The Number One Song in Heaven" on YouTube

"The Number One Song in Heaven" is a disco song by American rock duo Sparks. Released as a single in 1979, the song was produced and co-written by electro-disco producer Giorgio Moroder. It became a top 20 hit in the UK, where it peaked at number 14. In addition to the standard black vinyl, both the 7" and 12" versions of the single were issued in a variety of coloured vinyl releases (red, blue, and green).

Sparks re-recorded the song in 1997, one version of which featured vocals by Scottish singer Jimmy Somerville of British synth-pop groups Bronski Beat and the Communards and orchestrations by Tony Visconti. This version peaked at number 70 in the UK, but was slightly more successful on the U.S. Billboard Dance Chart where it became a top 30 hit.

== Track listing ==
=== 1979 release ===
- 7 inch Virgin VS 244
1. "The Number One Song in Heaven" – 3:48
2. "The Number One Song in Heaven" (long version) – 6:56
- 12 inch Virgin VS 244-12
1. "The Number One Song in Heaven" – 4:02
2. "The Number One Song in Heaven" (long version) – 7:27

=== 1997 release ===
- CD single 1
1. "The Number One Song in Heaven" (Sparks radio edit) – 3:28
2. "The Number One Song in Heaven" (extended version with Jimmy Somerville) – 5:16
3. "The Number One Song in Heaven" (part two) – 4:05
- CD single 2
1. "The Number One Song in Heaven" (Sparks radio edit) – 3:28
2. "The Number One Song in Heaven" (Tin Tin Out mix) – 8:15
3. "The Number One Song in Heaven" (Heavenly dub) – 8:15
4. "The Number One Song in Heaven" (Tin Tin Out instrumental) – 9:14

== Personnel ==
Sparks

- Ron Mael – keyboards, synthesizer, vocals
- Russell Mael – vocals

Additional musicians

- Chris Bennett – backing vocals
- Keith Forsey – drums
- Jack Moran – backing vocals
- Giorgio Moroder – synthesizer, vocoder
- Dan Wyman – synthesizer programming
- Dennis Young – backing vocals

== Charts ==
1979 original release

Chart	Peak position
Australia (Kent Music Report)	85
UK Singles (OCC)	14
Ireland (IRMA)	5

1997 re-recording

Chart	Peak position
Scotland (OCC)	54
UK Singles (OCC)	70
US Dance Play (Billboard)	28
