= No. 1 in Heaven =

Nº 1 in Heaven

Studio album by Sparks
- Released: March 1, 1979
- Recorded: 1978
- Studios: Musicland (Munich); Sound Arts (Los Angeles); Westlake (Los Angeles)
- Genres: Disco; electronica; synth-pop; hi-NRG
- Length: 33:44
- Labels: Elektra (US); Virgin (UK)
- Producer: Giorgio Moroder

Sparks chronology
Introducing Sparks (1977)	Nº 1 in Heaven (1979)	Terminal Jive (1980)

Singles from Nº 1 in Heaven
- 1. "La Dolce Vita" Released: February 1979; 2. "The Number One Song in Heaven" Released: March 1979; 3. "Tryouts for the Human Race" Released: May 1979; 4. "Beat the Clock" Released: July 1979

Nº 1 in Heaven is the eighth studio album by American pop and rock duo Sparks. Recorded with Italian disco producer Giorgio Moroder, the album marked a change of musical direction for the group and became influential on later synth-pop bands.

Released on March 1, 1979 by Virgin Records (with initial copies on colored vinyl) and later licensed to Elektra Records in the US, Nº 1 in Heaven renewed interest in the band after the disappointing sales of their preceding studio albums Big Beat (1976) and Introducing Sparks (1977). It is the band's only album on Elektra, the fourth label that the band was signed to in the US.

== Background ==
In 1973, Sparks members Russell and Ron Mael decamped from the US to the UK, resulting in a change of lineup upon hiring English musicians to fill the roles of guitar, bass guitar and drums. Consequently, Sparks enjoyed their first period of success amidst the glam rock zeitgeist, wherein their singles and albums sold well and were received warmly by critics. After their fifth studio album Indiscreet (1975), the third of Sparks' UK-based albums, sold less well than its two predecessors, the Maels then chose to return to Los Angeles.

Initially, they had returned to work with early Sparks member Earle Mankey and recorded the song "England" with him. Eventually the group turned to songwriter and producer Rupert Holmes and recorded the heavier and more produced Big Beat (1976) with a number of session musicians. Although the album employed a more "American" sound, it did little business in the US or the UK. The next studio album, Introducing Sparks (1977), was much lighter but was no more successful than Big Beat. This new "West Coast" sound was deemed a failure and "bereft of personality".

By 1978, the Maels found themselves at a crossroads; they had tired of the rock band format and were determined to take their music in a more electronic direction. They expressed admiration for Italian producer Giorgio Moroder, known for his pioneering electronic work on Donna Summer's 1977 song "I Feel Love", to a German journalist who turned out to be a friend of his. Sparks then teamed up with Moroder to record Nº 1 in Heaven at Moroder's Musicland Studios in Munich, West Germany.

== Production ==
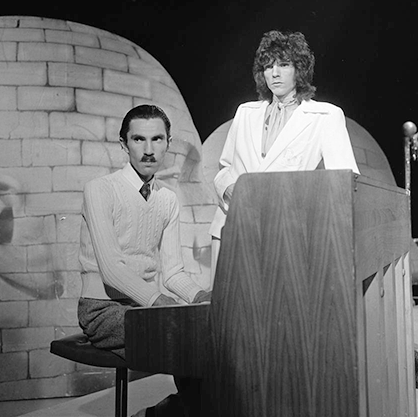
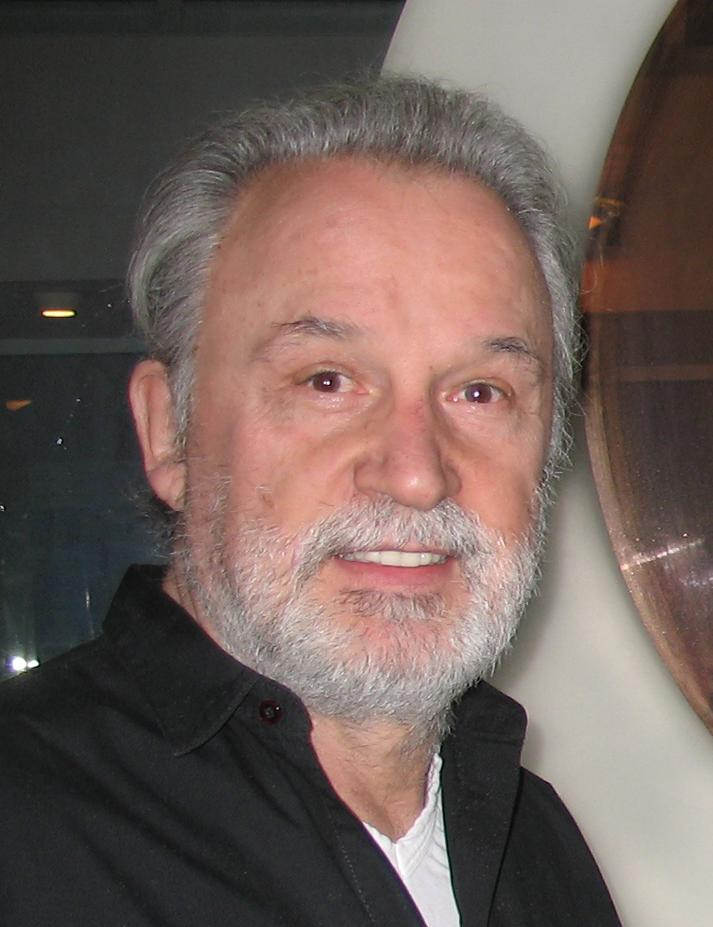
For Nº 1 in Heaven, Sparks (in 1974, left) teamed up with producer Giorgio Moroder (in 2007, right)

Nº 1 in Heaven had a dramatically different sound from that of Sparks' previous seven studio albums. The group dropped the standard guitar, bass guitar, and piano from its musical palette, and the new sound was dominated by layered sequencers and synthesizers, underpinned by the drums and percussion of Moroder collaborator Keith Forsey. Russell Mael's distinctive falsetto was extensively layered with overdubs and backing vocalists. Aside from Ron's lyrics and Russell's vocals, musically, the sound of the album matched that of Moroder's trademark hi-NRG sound that had begun with "I Feel Love".

The first US editions of Nº 1 in Heaven contained content identical to the original Virgin UK release, but later editions substituted the 12" extended mix of "Beat the Clock" for the album version.

== Release and critical reception ==
Professional ratings
Review scores
Source	Rating
AllMusic	5/5 stars
Christgau's Record Guide (1981)	B+
Pitchfork	9.4/10
Record Mirror (1979)	3/5 stars
Sounds (1979)	3.5/5 stars

Nº 1 in Heaven was promoted by the release of four singles over 1979. The first single, "La Dolce Vita", was released in early 1979 in Europe but did not chart. "The Number One Song in Heaven" then became the duo's first hit since "Looks, Looks, Looks" in 1975, reaching No. 14 in the UK and No. 5 on the Irish Singles Chart. "Beat the Clock" fared even better in the UK, reaching the top ten in July of that year. The final single, "Tryouts for the Human Race", hit No. 45. All singles (except "La Dolce Vita") were released on picture disc/colored vinyl, with exclusive remixes/edits. The album itself, while reaching the charts in the UK and therefore faring better than Sparks' previous two studio albums, managed only one week at No. 73 in September 1979.

Upon release, reviews in the UK music press were mostly negative. NME wrote that the songs "elongated into pseudo European-drisco drama". Reviewer Ian Penman said, "Moroder's production is essentially irrelevant", and found that the album was "neither a comedy album nor a experimental album, but it possesses the near instant redundancy of both." Melody Maker panned the album concluding, "the most pathetic thing of all is that they seem to think you'll want to dance to it". Record Mirror said that the album was "a complete frustration from beginning to end" with odes to Donna Summer's "Down Deep Inside" on "My Other Voice" and to David Bowie on "Tryouts for the Human Race". Reviewer James Parade finally said: "Once upon a time, they were at least five years ahead. At the moment, they're lying two years behind". Sounds' Sandy Robertson, on the other hand, considered Moroder "the best filter for [the band's] ideas since [Todd] Rundgren" and qualified the album as "icy sharp and fresh".

In the US, Trouser Press' Bruce Paley found that the songs were "solid, innovative and exciting". The New York Times called the album a "fascinating fusion disk, blending rock, disco, progressive rock and avant-gardism ... in a most unusual, appealing way."

Retrospective reviews have been more favorable. In a five-out-of-five star review published on AllMusic, Fred Thomas wrote; "The strange, campy, and surreal aspects of Sparks all gel with the party-chasing interstellar energy of Moroder's production touches, creating a timeless sound from unexpected bedfellows and sending out ripples that may have grown bigger than the initial splash could have predicted". Paste named Nº 1 in Heaven the 138th-greatest album of all time and the best synth-pop album of all time.

== Legacy ==
English rock band Joy Division cited Nº 1 in Heaven as a primary influence on their 1980 song "Love Will Tear Us Apart". Drummer Stephen Morris stated: "When we were doing 'Love Will Tear Us Apart', there were two records we were into: Frank Sinatra's Greatest Hits and 'Number One Song in Heaven' by Sparks. That was the beginning of getting interested in Giorgio Moroder".

== Track listing ==
All tracks are written by Ron Mael, Giorgio Moroder and Russell Mael, except where noted

Side one
No.	Title	Writer(s)	Length
1.	"Tryouts for the Human Race"		6:05
2.	"Academy Award Performance"	Ron Mael	5:00
3.	"La Dolce Vita"		5:56

Side two
No.	Title	Writer(s)	Length
4.	"Beat the Clock"	Ron Mael; Russell Mael	4:23
5.	"My Other Voice"		4:54
6.	"The Number One Song in Heaven"		7:26
Total length:			33:44

2009 Imperial Records (Japan) bonus tracks
No.	Title	Writer(s)	Length
7.	"Dancing Is Dangerous"	Ron Mael; Russell Mael	9:43
8.	"Is There More to Life Than Dancing"	Ron Mael; Russell Mael	8:08
9.	"Beat the Clock (Meat Beat Manifesto Remix - Double Bass Remix)"	Ron Mael; Russell Mael	6:13

2013 Repertoire Records (Europe) bonus tracks
No.	Title	Writer(s)	Length
7.	"Tryouts for the Human Race (Single Version)"		3:17
8.	"La Dolce Vita (Single Version)"		3:48
9.	"Beat the Clock (Single Version)"	Ron Mael; Russell Mael	3:46
10.	"The Number One Song in Heaven (Single Version)"		3:53
11.	"Beat the Clock (Canadian Single Version)"	Ron Mael; Russell Mael	4:21
12.	"Tryouts for the Human Race (Extended Version)"		7:56
13.	"La Dolce Vita (Extended Version)"		5:57
14.	"Beat the Clock (Extended Version)"	Ron Mael; Russell Mael	6:40
15.	"Tryouts for the Human Race (12 Inch Short Version)"		3:58

2019 40th Anniversary Edition bonus tracks
No.	Title	Writer(s)	Length
7.	"Tryouts for the Human Race (Alternative Long Version)"		7:57
8.	"Peter Cook's Promo Spot for No. 1 in Heaven"		2:38
9.	"The Number One Song in Heaven (Single Version)"		3:51
10.	"Beat the Clock (Long Version)"	Ron Mael; Russell Mael	6:46
11.	"Peter Cook's Promo Spot for Tryouts for the Human Race"		2:51
12.	"Tryouts for the Human Race (Single Version)"		3:22

== Personnel ==
Credits are adapted from the Nº 1 in Heaven liner notes.

Sparks

- Ron Mael – keyboards, synthesizer, vocals
- Russell Mael – vocals

Additional musicians

- Keith Forsey – drums, percussion
- Giorgio Moroder – synthesizer, vocoder
- Dan Wyman – synthesizer programming
- Chris Bennett, Dennis Young, Jack Moran – backing vocals

Production and artwork

- Giorgio Moroder – producer
- Jürgen Koppers – engineer
- Steven Bartel – design
- Moshe Brakha – photography

== Charts ==
=== Album ===
Original release
Chart (1979)	Peak position
Australia (Kent Music Report)	63
Swedish Albums (Sverigetopplistan)	43
UK Albums (Official Charts)	73
US Billboard Bubbling Under the Top LPs	204

Later performance
Chart (2019–2024)	Peak position
Scottish Albums (OCC)	44
UK Albums Charts Update (OCC)	89
UK Albums Sales (OCC)	68
UK Dance Albums (OCC)	9
UK Independent Albums (OCC)	18
UK Physical Albums (OCC)	59
UK Vinyl Albums (OCC)	7

=== Singles ===
"The Number One Song in Heaven"
Chart (1979)	Peak position
Ireland (IRMA)	5
UK Singles (OCC)	14

"Beat the Clock"
Chart (1979)	Peak position
Canada Dance/Urban (RPM)	15
Belgium (Ultratop 50 Flanders)	10
Netherlands (Dutch Top 40)	15
Netherlands (Single Top 100)	16
UK Singles (OCC)	10

"Tryouts for the Human Race"
Chart (1979)	Peak position
UK Singles (OCC)	45
