= Russell Mael =

American musician and co-founder of the band Sparks

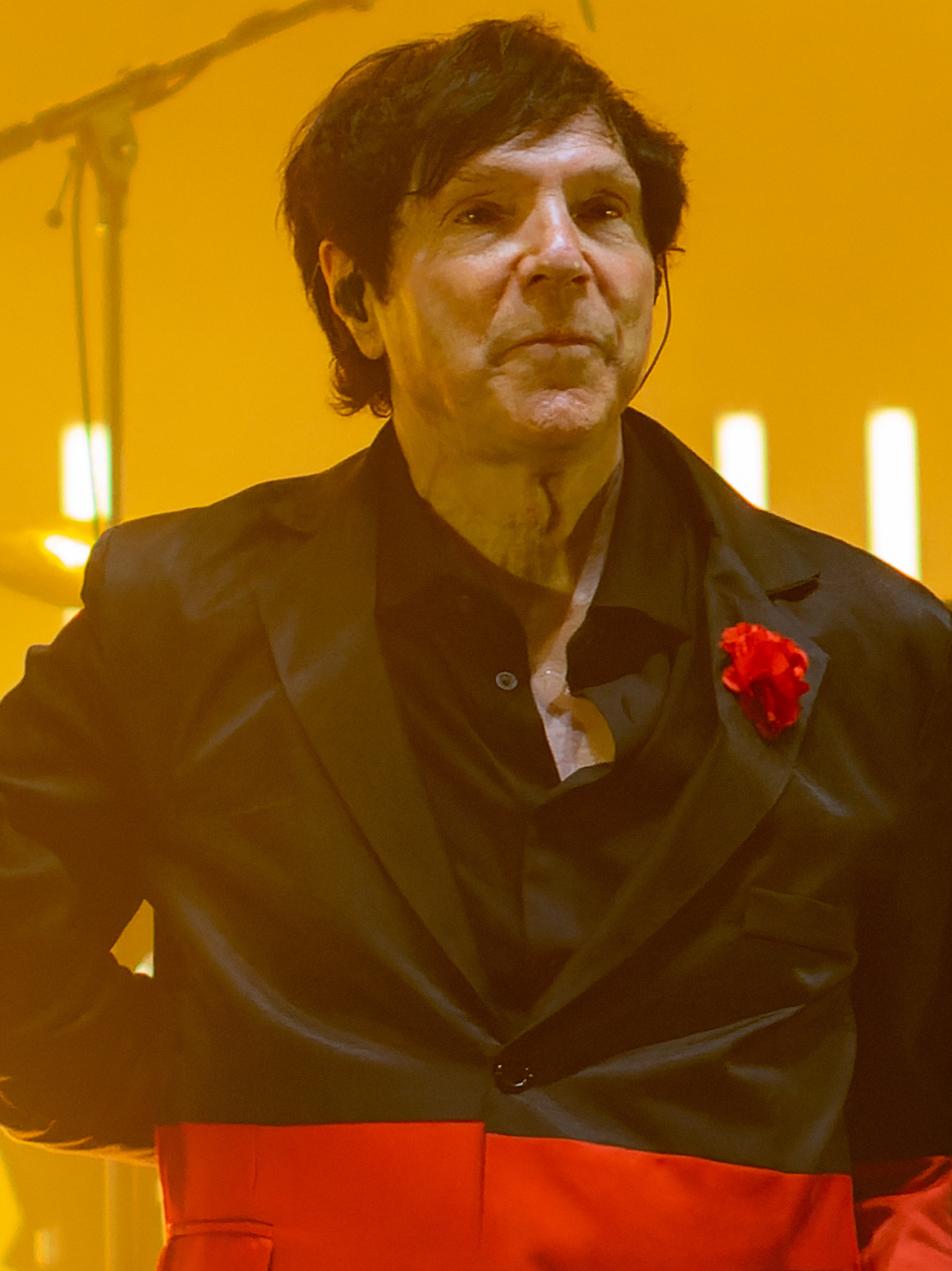
- Mael during a performance at the Royal Albert Hall in London, England, 2023

Background information
- Born: Russell Craig Mael; October 5, 1948 (age 77); Los Angeles, California, U.S.
- Origin: Pacific Palisades, Los Angeles, U.S.
- Genres: Art pop; art rock; glam rock; electronic; synth-pop; new wave
- Occupation: Singer
- Years active: 1965–present
- Labels: Lil' Beethoven; Island; Atlantic; Bearsville; Warner Bros.; Curb; Virgin; Underdog; Carrere; CBS; Elektra; RCA; Roadrunner; Domino; Transgressive
- Member of: Sparks
- Formerly of: FFS
- Website: allsparks.com

Russell Craig Mael (born October 5, 1948) is an American singer best known as the lead vocalist for the pop and rock duo Sparks, which he formed in 1971 with his elder brother Ron Mael. Mael is known for his wide vocal range, in particular his far-reaching falsetto. He has a flamboyant and hyperactive stage presence which contrasts sharply with Ron Mael's impassive demeanour. The duo released an album with Scottish rock band Franz Ferdinand, as the supergroup FFS, titled FFS, released in 2015. The Mael brothers are the founders of Lil' Beethoven Records.

== Early life ==
Russell Craig Mael was born on October 5, 1948, in Los Angeles, California. The Mael brothers grew up in Pacific Palisades – a relatively affluent beach neighborhood of Los Angeles – with their father Meyer, who was a graphic designer and caricaturist for the Hollywood Citizen-News, and their mother, Miriam (née Moskowitz), a librarian. Both Meyer and Miriam were the children of Jewish immigrants, Meyer of Austrian and Russian descent and Miriam Polish; despite this, a source affiliated with the brothers' 2021 documentary stated that they "weren't raised, nor do they identify as, Jewish", and the documentary does not mention their Jewish heritage. Even though he played soccer and lacrosse all throughout high school, much of his inspiration came from his father taking him to the cinema as a child, where he developed an interest in film, visual arts and narrative. Meyer died when Russell was 8.

After graduating from Palisades High School, both brothers enrolled at UCLA; Ron began a course in cinema and graphic arts in 1963 while Russell studied theatre arts and filmmaking during 1966–1968.

== Sparks ==
Mael is known for his wide countertenor vocal range, and his most notable vocal trait is a far-reaching falsetto. An NME review described Russell's vocal range as a "stratospheric blend of Marc Bolan and Tiny Tim".

He has recorded 26 studio albums with his duo, Sparks. The duo has a cult following around the world and are best known for the song "This Town Ain't Big Enough for Both of Us", which reached No. 2 on the UK singles chart.

The pair appeared as themselves in the disaster-suspense film Rollercoaster (1977), performing live. They also appeared in episode 22 of season 6 of Gilmore Girls. Mael appeared in a cameo as a gallows singer in the Western black comedy film Damsel (2018), and both he and Ron appear as themselves in Annette (2021), a musical romantic drama film directed by French director Leos Carax that they wrote and composed.

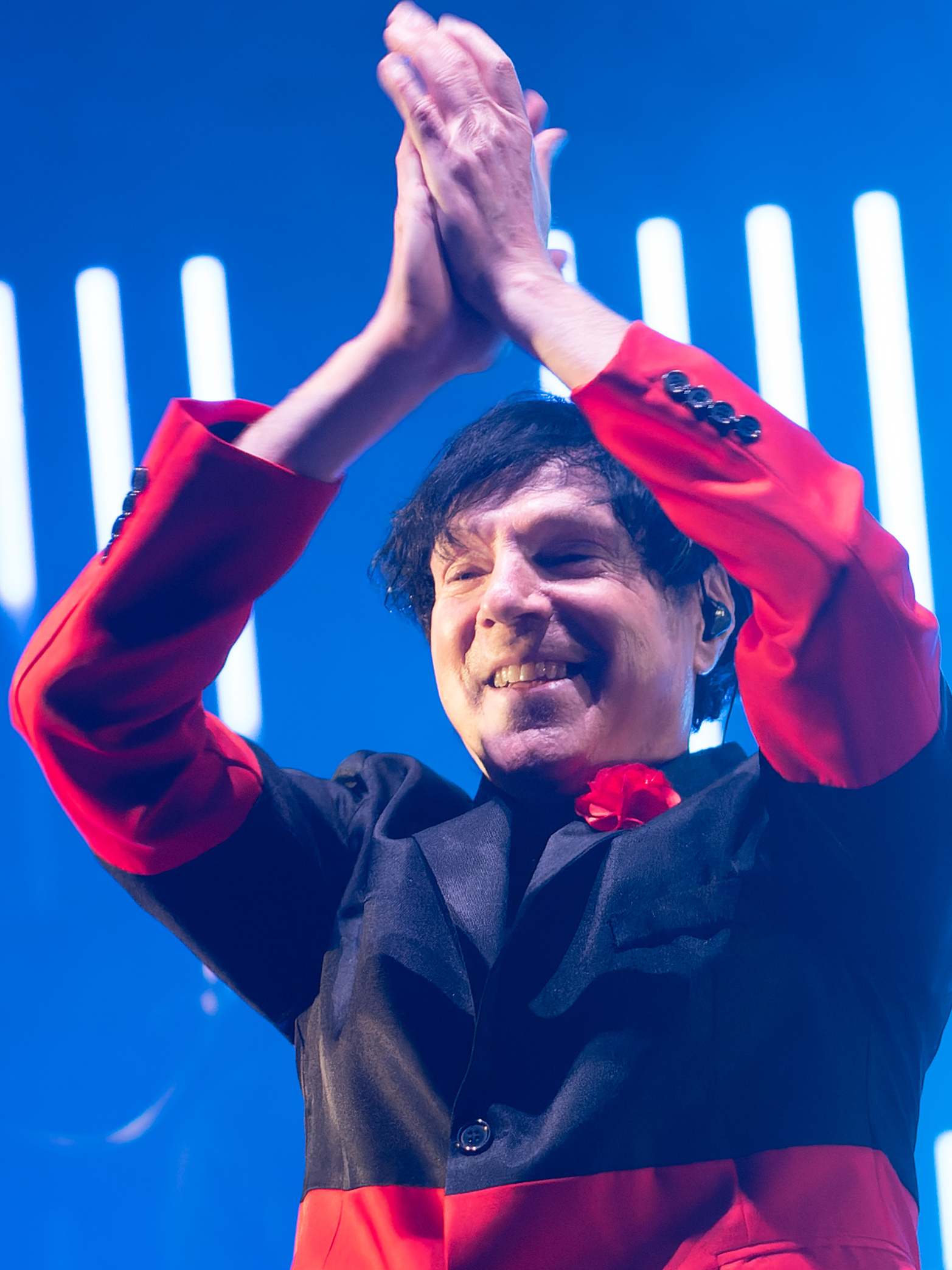
Mael during a performance at the Royal Albert Hall in London, England, 2023

In June 2018, English filmmaker Edgar Wright announced he would be making a documentary on Sparks. He had covered the band's concert in London in May at O_{2} Forum Kentish Town. This concert would also be a part of the documentary. The film, The Sparks Brothers, had its world premiere at the 2021 Sundance Film Festival on January 30, 2021.

Since the late 1980s Sparks have almost exclusively recorded in Russell's home studio, to escape the limitations of expensive studio time and maintain creative independence. He mixes and engineers their work, and the brothers co-produce.

== Personal life ==
In 2017, a reviewer noted that while the brothers' biographies recount a Los Angeles childhood in which they surfed and were both models for mail order catalogues, their private lives are otherwise almost entirely unknown. "Well, we're in good company with Bob Dylan", was their reported response. "We feel the less you do know, it keeps the mythology and the image in a better position." Even to the question of whether they have partners or spouses, they refused to give an indication, insisting that "the vagueness is more interesting than the reality."

It was, however, mentioned in Edgar Wright's documentary film The Sparks Brothers (2021) that Russell dated Miss Christine of the GTOs, and had a brief fling with the Go-Go's member Jane Wiedlin, who was an additional vocalist on the Sparks track "Cool Places".

== Discography ==
With Sparks

| Year | Album |
|---|---|
| 1971 | Halfnelson |
| 1973 | A Woofer in Tweeter's Clothing |
| 1974 | Kimono My House |
| 1974 | Propaganda |
| 1975 | Indiscreet |
| 1976 | Big Beat |
| 1977 | Introducing Sparks |
| 1979 | Nº 1 in Heaven |
| 1980 | Terminal Jive |
| 1981 | Whomp That Sucker |
| 1982 | Angst in My Pants |
| 1983 | In Outer Space |
| 1984 | Pulling Rabbits Out of a Hat |
| 1986 | Music That You Can Dance To |
| 1988 | Interior Design |
| 1994 | Gratuitous Sax & Senseless Violins |
| 1997 | Plagiarism |
| 2000 | Balls |
| 2002 | Lil' Beethoven |
| 2006 | Hello Young Lovers |
| 2008 | Exotic Creatures of the Deep |
| 2009 | The Seduction of Ingmar Bergman |
| 2017 | Hippopotamus |
| 2020 | A Steady Drip, Drip, Drip |
| 2021 | Annette |
| 2023 | The Girl Is Crying in Her Latte |
| 2025 | Mad! |

With FFS

| Year | Album |
|---|---|
| 2015 | FFS |
