= Ron Mael =

American musician and co-founder of the band Sparks (born 1945)

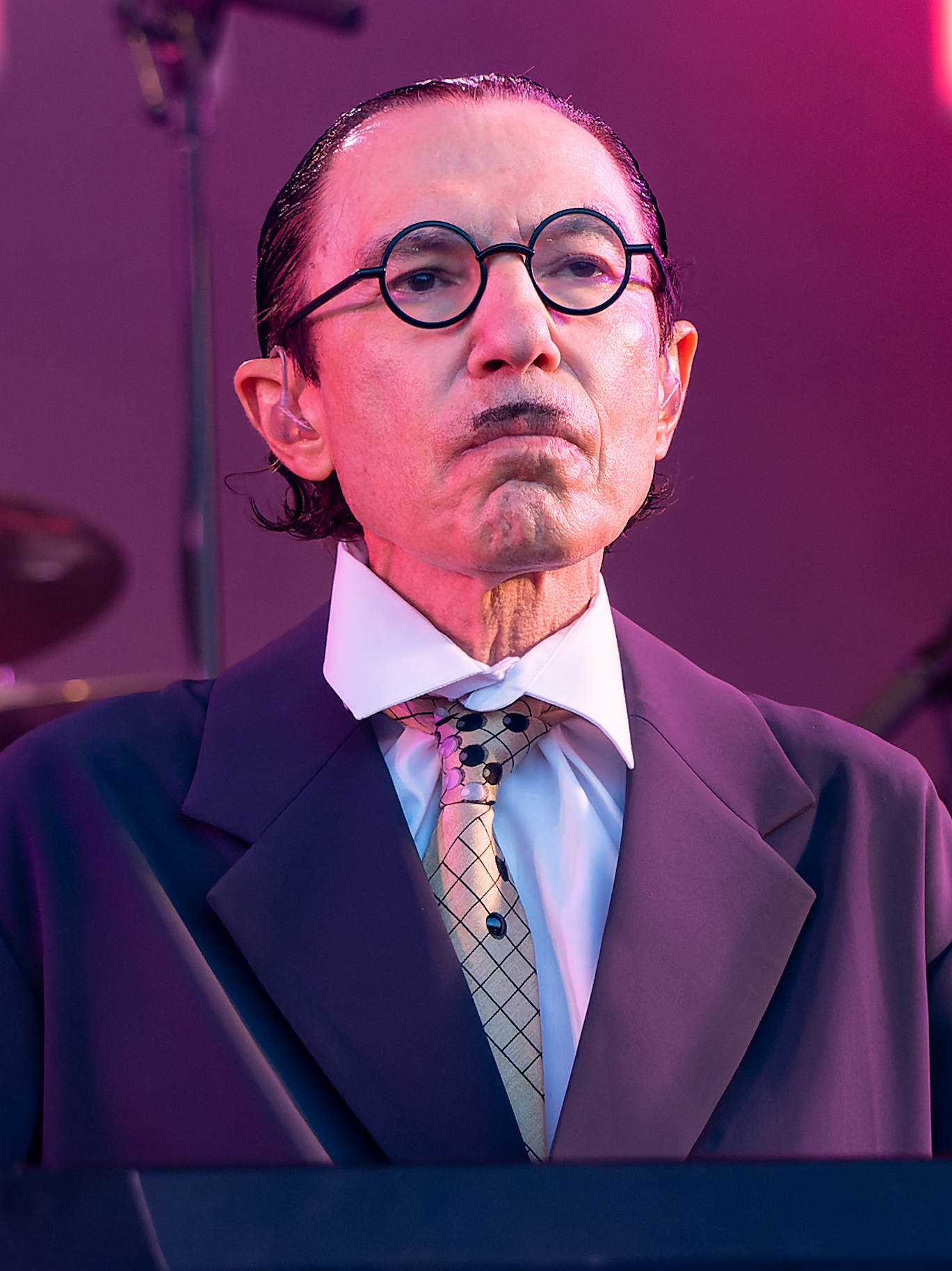
- Mael onstage at Glastonbury Festival 2023

Background information
- Born: Ronald David Mael; August 12, 1945 (age 81); Culver City, California, U.S.
- Origin: Pacific Palisades, Los Angeles, U.S.
- Genres: Art pop; art rock; glam rock; electronic; synth-pop; new wave
- Occupations: Musician; songwriter; composer; record producer; music programmer; film director
- Instruments: Keyboards; synthesizer
- Years active: 1963–present
- Labels: Lil' Beethoven; Island; Atlantic; Bearsville; Warner Bros.; Curb; Virgin; Underdog; Carrere; CBS; Elektra; RCA; Roadrunner; Domino; Transgressive
- Member of: Sparks
- Formerly of: FFS
- Website: allsparks.com

Ronald David Mael (born August 12, 1945) is an American musician, songwriter, composer, record producer, music programmer, and film director. He is the keyboardist and principal songwriter in the pop and rock duo Sparks, which he founded with lead vocalist, occasional songwriter and younger brother Russell Mael in 1971. Mael is known for his quirky and idiosyncratic approach to songwriting, his intricate and rhythmic keyboard playing style and for his deadpan and low key, scowling demeanour onstage often remaining motionless over his keyboard in sharp contrast to Russell's animated and hyperactive frontman antics. Ron Mael is also noted for his conservative clothes and distinctive moustache. The Mael brothers are the founders of Lil' Beethoven Records.

== Early life ==
Ronald David Mael was born on August 12, 1945, in Culver City, California. The Mael brothers grew up in Pacific Palisades – an affluent beach neighborhood of Los Angeles – with their father, Meyer Mael, who was a graphic designer and caricaturist for the Hollywood Citizen-News, and their mother, Miriam (née Moskowitz), a librarian. Both Meyer and Miriam were the children of Jewish immigrants, Meyer from Russia and Austria and Miriam from Poland; despite this, a source affiliated with the brothers' 2021 documentary stated that they "weren't raised, nor do they identify as Jewish", and the documentary does not mention their Jewish heritage. Much of the Mael brothers' initial inspiration came from their father taking them to the cinema as children, where they developed an interest in film, visual arts and narrative. Meyer died when Mael was 11.

After being educated at Palisades High School, both brothers enrolled at UCLA; Ron began a course in cinema and graphic arts in 1963 while Russell studied theatre arts and filmmaking between 1966 and 1968. It was during their time at UCLA the brothers formed their first band, The Urban Renewal Project, who recorded a series of demos in 1967.

== Sparks ==
Ron Mael plays the keyboards and synthesizers and writes most of the songs for Sparks. When the band hit the peak of its popularity in the 1970s, he was well known for his strange appearance, often remaining motionless over his keyboard in sharp contrast to Russell's animated and hyperactive frontman antics. Ron's conservative clothes and unfashionable, Charlie Chaplin-esque toothbrush moustache attracted much attention, as does his current pencil moustache. Onstage, Ron occasionally alternates between playing the keyboard and engaging in comic mime routines, often in connection with projections on backdrop. A feature of a live Sparks show is Ron's dance routine, which he continues to perform into his 80s.

For the first two studio albums with Halfnelson/Sparks, Mael played a Wurlitzer electronic piano, but found that it did not stand up to road use because the metal reeds broke frequently. When Sparks relocated to the UK, Mael began using an RMI Electra-Piano, played through an Echoplex tape echo unit, and this distinctive sound featured prominently on their breakthrough single "This Town Ain't Big Enough for Both of Us", the studio albums Kimono My House and Propaganda (both 1974) and in their live shows. Since 1981, he has used various Yamaha and Roland keyboards and synthesizers live. That year, he altered the Roland logo on the back of his Roland Jupiter-8 to read "Ronald", which he has done on all of his keyboards since then. He currently uses a Yamaha Motif XF8.

The pair appeared as themselves in the disaster-suspense film Rollercoaster (1977), performing live. They also appeared in episode twenty-two of season six of the Gilmore Girls.

In a rare non-Sparks related musical turn, Mael wrote all of the lyrics for Belgian synth-pop group Telex's third studio album, Sex (1981). Marc Moulin and Dan Lacksman had been introduced to Ron and Russell Mael by their mutual friend, Lio. Facing pressures to release an album in English, Moulin extended an offer to the Maels to contribute lyrics to their upcoming LP. This prompted a long-term friendship between the two artists, and led directly to Lacksman's assistance with the production of Sparks' twelfth studio album In Outer Space (1983).

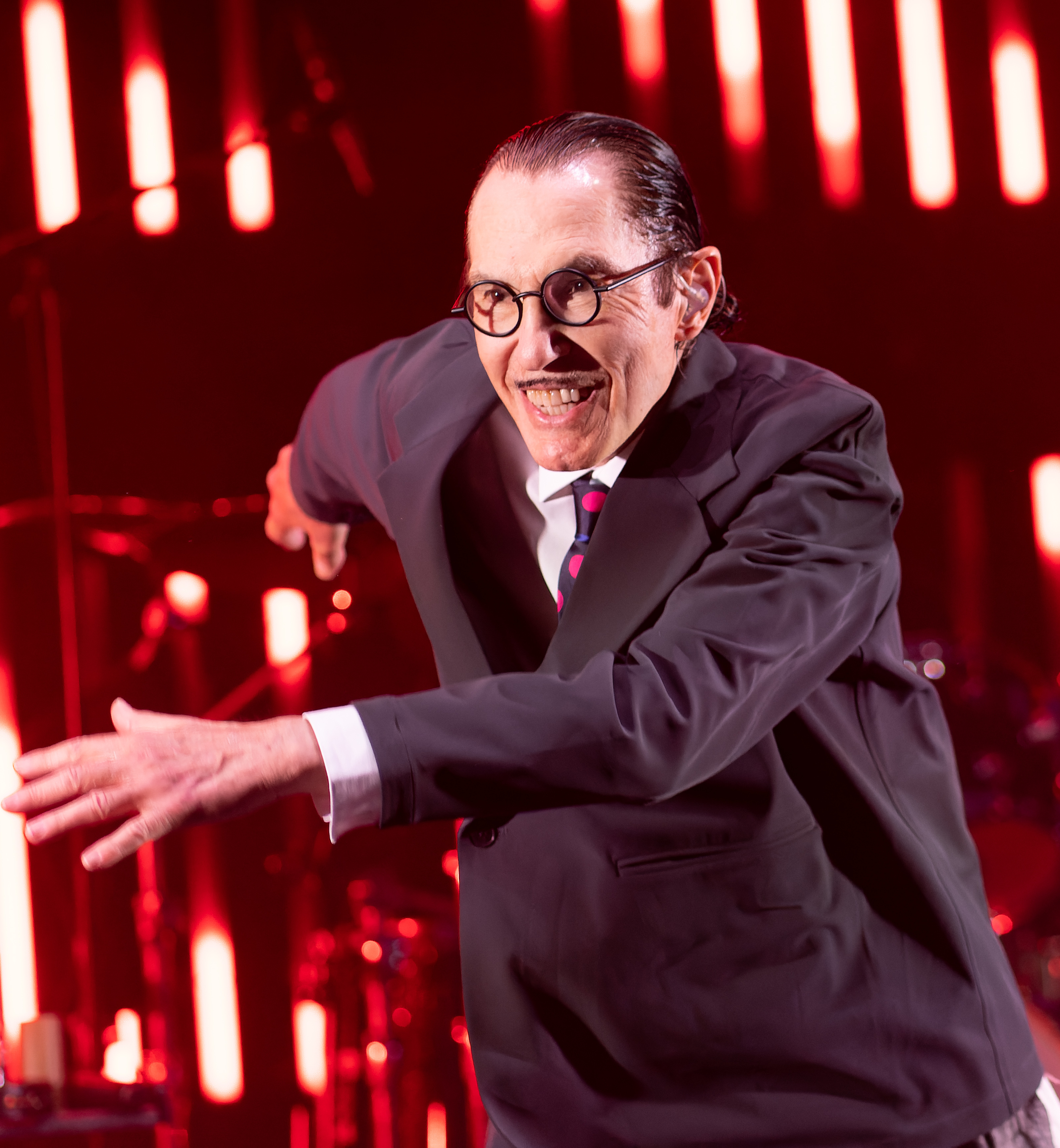
Mael dancing during a performance at the Royal Albert Hall in London, England, 2023

In June 2018, English filmmaker Edgar Wright announced he would be making a documentary on Sparks. He had covered the band's concert in London in May at O_{2} Forum Kentish Town. This concert would also be a part of the documentary. The film, The Sparks Brothers, had its world premiere at the 2021 Sundance Film Festival on January 30, 2021.

== Personal life ==
In 2017, a reviewer noted that while the brothers' biographies recount an LA childhood in which they surfed and were both models for mail order catalogues, their private lives are otherwise almost entirely unknown. "Well, we're in good company with Bob Dylan", was their reported response. "We feel the less you do know, it keeps the mythology and the image in a better position." Even to the question of whether they have partners or spouses, they refused to give an indication, insisting that "the vagueness is more interesting than the reality."

== Discography ==
With Sparks

Year	Album
1971	Halfnelson
1973	A Woofer in Tweeter's Clothing
1974	Kimono My House
1974	Propaganda
1975	Indiscreet
1976	Big Beat
1977	Introducing Sparks
1979	Nº 1 in Heaven
1980	Terminal Jive
1981	Whomp That Sucker
1982	Angst in My Pants
1983	In Outer Space
1984	Pulling Rabbits Out of a Hat
1986	Music That You Can Dance To
1988	Interior Design
1994	Gratuitous Sax & Senseless Violins
1997	Plagiarism
2000	Balls
2002	Lil' Beethoven
2006	Hello Young Lovers
2008	Exotic Creatures of the Deep
2009	The Seduction of Ingmar Bergman
2017	Hippopotamus
2020	A Steady Drip, Drip, Drip
2023	The Girl Is Crying in Her Latte
2025	Mad!

With FFS

Year	Album
2015	FFS
