= The Girl Is Crying in Her Latte =

Studio album by Sparks
- Released: May 26, 2023
- Studio: Sparks (Los Angeles, California)
- Genre: Art pop; synth-pop; progressive pop
- Length: 47:35
- Label: Island
- Producer: Ron Mael; Russell Mael

Sparks chronology
The Sparks Brothers (2022)	The Girl Is Crying in Her Latte (2023)	Annette – An Opera by Sparks (The Original 2013 Recordings) (2024)

Singles from The Girl Is Crying in Her Latte
- 1. "The Girl Is Crying in Her Latte" Released: March 3, 2023; 2. "Veronica Lake" Released: April 21, 2023; 3. "Nothing Is as Good as They Say It Is" Released: May 12, 2023

The Girl Is Crying in Her Latte is the 25th studio album by American pop and rock duo Sparks, released through Island Records on May 26, 2023, their first release through the label since 1976. It was preceded by the release of three singles, and received acclaim from critics. The duo toured the world until July 2023 in support of the album, the biggest headlining tour of their career.

== Background and promotion ==
On January 24, 2023, Sparks announced that they had again signed with Island Records, the label which released their albums Kimono My House (1974), Propaganda (1974), Indiscreet (1975) and Big Beat (1976). On March 3, 2023, the lead single, "The Girl Is Crying in Her Latte" was released, with a music video starring Australian actress Cate Blanchett. The second single, "Veronica Lake", was released on April 21, 2023. The third single, "Nothing Is as Good as They Say It Is", was released on May 12, 2023, and is "sung from the perspective of a 22-hour old baby who is disgusted with the world, and wants to return to the womb".

== Critical reception ==
Professional ratings
Aggregate scores
Source	Rating
AnyDecentMusic?	7.7/10
Metacritic	85/100
Review scores
Source	Rating
AllMusic	4/5 stars
American Songwriter	4.5/5 stars
Clash	7/10
Classic Rock	4/5 stars
The Guardian	5/5 stars
The Line of Best Fit	8/10
Mojo	4/5 stars
musicOMH	4/5 stars
NME	4/5 stars
Pitchfork	7.9/10

The Girl Is Crying in Her Latte received a score of 85 out of 100 on review aggregator Metacritic based on 13 critics' reviews, indicating "universal acclaim". Editors of AnyDecentMusic? characterize 13 reviews as a 7.7 out of 10. Robin Murray of Clash described the album as "like vintage Sparks, while also refusing to rest on their laurels. Glamorous but never glam, funny without resorting to casual sarcasm, their arch style is married to a form of songwriting that aims for the heart", calling it an "impactful record that illuminates their continued engagement with the wonder of the pop song". Reviewing the album for Pitchfork, Stuart Berman opined that it "exudes even more vitality and verve" than their recent work, and "strik[es] the ideal Sparksian balance of madcap melody, labyrinthine arrangement, and stinging social satire", writing that "no other band articulates existential dread with such playful panache and joyous absurdity".

David Murphy, writing for musicOMH, remarked that the duo are "still expanding their palette", which he called "impressive" as they "still sound exactly like themselves". Phil Mongredien of The Guardian gave it five out of five stars and called it "far from an exercise in backwards-looking nostalgia or a rehash of former glories. In fact, it's an utter joy, one gloriously artful pop banger overflowing with clever ideas following another", including "arresting lyrics and equally arresting melodies jostle [that] for the listener's attention". Erica Campbell of NME wrote that The Girl Is Crying in Her Latte is "a reminder that even now, Sparks are completely content with boldly going first, taking their music into ambitious territory no one else has been before".

Heather Phares of AllMusic opined that there is "something distinctly cinematic about the sounds and storytelling" on the album, commenting that it is "extra satisfying that this peak in their popularity coincides with music this vibrantly engaging". Hal Horowitz of American Songwriter dubbed it Sparks' best work, writing, "To say it sounds like another great Sparks set might be damning it with faint praise", and calling it "inspirational" that Ron Mael "can stay at the top of his game after this long in the art/pop trenches".

John Aizlewood of Mojo wrote, "Ron Mael's lyrics are elegiac, witty and forensically detailed ('then, your sweater caught my shopping cart'); Russell Mael delivers them exquisitely and they specialise in ear worms. How on earth do they do it?" Reviewing the album for Classic Rock, Stephen Dalton found that the duo "cement their autumnal resurgence" with the album, which he described as "a very strong collection of vintage Sparks moods, plus a few new left-field twists", concluding that Sparks "are living proof that weirdness never gets old". Simon Heavisides of The Line of Best Fit wrote that "AI could never replicate the unique balance between deranged imagination and supreme sanity that is the mark of a great Sparks record like this". He felt that the album is "not really a return to the Island years musically" and "If there is a criticism, maybe they could open things up and allow an outside producer in for the first time in many years, on past experience a wise move".

== Commercial performance ==
The album entered the UK Albums Chart at no. 7, the third consecutive Sparks studio album to debut at that position.

== Track listing ==
All tracks are written by Ron and Russell Mael.

The Girl Is Crying in Her Latte track listing
No.	Title	Length
1.	"The Girl Is Crying in Her Latte"	2:56
2.	"Veronica Lake"	3:02
3.	"Nothing Is as Good as They Say It Is"	3:13
4.	"Escalator"	2:57
5.	"The Mona Lisa's Packing, Leaving Late Tonight"	3:33
6.	"You Were Meant for Me"	4:16
7.	"Not That Well-Defined"	3:29
8.	"We Go Dancing"	3:07
9.	"When You Leave"	4:18
10.	"Take Me for a Ride"	4:07
11.	"It's Sunny Today"	2:39
12.	"A Love Story"	3:17
13.	"It Doesn't Have to Be That Way"	3:40
14.	"Gee, That Was Fun"	3:01
Total length:		47:35

== Personnel ==
Credits are adapted from the CD liner notes.

=== Sparks ===
- Ron Mael – keyboards, programming, string arrangements, production
- Russell Mael – vocals, programming, production, engineering, mixing

=== Backing band ===
- Stevie Nistor – drums
- Evan Weiss – guitars
- Eli Pearl – guitars
- Max Whipple – bass

=== Additional contributors ===
- Bill Inglot – mastering
- Dave Schultz – mastering
- Julie Vlasak – art direction and design
- Munachi Osegbu – photography

== Charts ==
Chart performance for The Girl Is Crying in Her Latte
Chart (2023)	Peak position
Austrian Albums (Ö3 Austria)	58
Belgian Albums (Ultratop Flanders)	129
Belgian Albums (Ultratop Wallonia)	40
French Albums (SNEP)	128
German Albums (Offizielle Top 100)	37
Scottish Albums (OCC)	2
Swiss Albums (Schweizer Hitparade)	35
UK Albums (OCC)	7
UK Album Downloads (OCC)	9
US Top Album Sales (Billboard)	48
US Top Current Album Sales (Billboard)	29
