= This Town Ain't Big Enough for Both of Us =

1974 single by Sparks

Single by Sparks

from the album Kimono My House and Plagiarism (1997 re-recording with Faith No More)
- B-side: "Barbecutie"
- Released: April 1974
- Recorded: 1974
- Genre: Glam rock; progressive pop
- Length: 3:06
- Label: Island
- Songwriter: Ron Mael
- Producer: Muff Winwood

Sparks singles chronology
"Girl from Germany" (1972)	"This Town Ain't Big Enough for Both of Us" (1974)	"Amateur Hour" (1974)

Faith No More singles chronology
"Stripsearch" (1997)	"This Town Ain't Big Enough for Both of Us" (1998)	"I Started a Joke" (1998)

Music video
- "This Town Ain't Big Enough for Both of Us" on YouTube

"This Town Ain't Big Enough for Both of Us" is a song by American pop and rock band Sparks. Written by Ron Mael, it is the opening track on their third studio album Kimono My House (1974), and was the lead single from the album. Although it did not chart on the Billboard Hot 100, "This Town Ain't Big Enough for Both of Us" achieved major success in Europe, peaking within the top ten of the charts in the Netherlands, Switzerland and the United Kingdom. In the latter country, the song peaked at number two on the UK singles chart, where it remained for two consecutive weeks. The song has become the highest-charting for Sparks on the UK singles chart.

== Background ==
The original idea for the song was that after each verse Russell Mael would sing a movie dialogue cliché, one of which was "This town ain't big enough for both of us", used in the Western film The Western Code (1932). They dropped the idea of having different phrases and instead used only the one in the title. The original working title of the song was "Too Hot to Handle".

The song's record producer Muff Winwood used distinctive Western-style gunshots on the recording after Ron and Russell "went through a whole BBC library and found the perfect gunshot for that song."

The Maels frequently told the story that Winwood had bet his friend Elton John that the song would become a top-five hit on the UK singles chart and that John, saying it would not, lost the bet. However, in his Sparks biography Talent Is an Asset (2009), Daryl Easlea reports that this was a "great tale" propagated by the Mael brothers but contradicted by Winwood himself. Winwood said that he was unsure of how commercial the track would be, so he played it to John, who told him, "Listen, I'll bet you a hundred quid that that makes the Top 3". Winwood's wife agreed, and his doubts were allayed.

== Musical style ==
The song was written without any regard for the vocal style of Russell Mael. Songwriter Ron Mael has explained:

"This Town Ain't Big Enough for Both of Us" was written in A, and by God it'll be sung in A. I just feel that if you're coming up with most of the music, then you have an idea where it's going to go. And no singer is gonna get in my way.

Russell Mael has claimed in reply:

When he wrote "This Town Ain't Big Enough for Both of Us", Ron could only play it in that key. It was so much work to transpose the song and one of us had to budge, so I made the adjustment to fit in. My voice ain't a "rock" voice. It's not soulful, in the traditional rock way; It's not about "guts". It's untrained, unschooled, I never questioned why I was singing high. It just happened, dictated by the songs. Ron has always written Sparks' lyrics and never transposed them into a rock key for me to sing. He always packed each line with words and I had to sing them as they were.

== Re-recordings ==
An acoustic version of the song was recorded in 1985 for the B-side of the "Change" single.

In 1997, Sparks recorded two new versions of the song for their 17th studio album Plagiarism. The first was an orchestral reworking arranged and conducted by Tony Visconti which reinstated a verse that Winwood had cut from the original. The other was as a collaboration with Faith No More, which was released as a single and peaked at number 40 on the UK singles chart.

== Critical reception ==
The Guardian said the song "was like a three-minute warning that Sparks were a band different from any other: octave-leaping vocals, gunshots, incomprehensible lyrics and an unrelenting sense of drama."

== Track listing ==
1974 original release

1. "This Town Ain't Big Enough for Both of Us" – 3:06
2. "Barbecutie" – 3:10

== Personnel ==
Sparks

- Russell Mael – vocals
- Ron Mael – keyboards
- Martin Gordon – bass guitar
- Adrian Fisher – guitar
- Norman "Dinky" Diamond – drums

== Chart positions ==
Original release (1974)

Chart	Peak position
Australia (Kent Music Report)	69
Belgium (Ultratop 50 Flanders)	4
France (SNEP)	15
Netherlands (Dutch Top 40)	5
Netherlands (Single Top 100)	4
Switzerland (Schweizer Hitparade)	7
UK (Official Charts Company)	2

Sparks vs. Faith No More (1997)

Chart (1997/98)	Peak position
Australia (ARIA)	69
Scotland (OCC)	39
UK (Official Charts Company)	40

Chart (2012)	Peak position
Belgium (Ultratop 50 Back Catalogue Singles Flanders)	47

== Certifications ==
Chart	Certifications (sales thresholds)
UK (Official Charts Company)	BPI: Silver

== Cover versions ==
- British rock band Siouxsie and the Banshees included a rendition of the song on their eighth studio album Through the Looking Glass (1987) as the opening track.
- German power metal band Heavens Gate included a version on their fourth studio album Planet E. (1996).
- Swedish Technical Death Metal band Theory In Practice included a version on their third studio album Colonizing The Sun (2002).
- British Whale (recording alias of the Darkness' singer and songwriter Justin Hawkins) released a version as his debut single in August 2005, which peaked at number six on the UK singles chart. Ron and Russell Mael appear in the music video for the song, as game show hosts.
- Portuguese band Humanos in their concerts performed a live version, mashing it with "O Corpo É Que Paga" by Portuguese 1980's icon António Variações, which is available on their live DVD.
- In live concerts, the Los Angeles and San Francisco glam rock band Celebrity Skin performed the song regularly during live performances beginning in 1987.
- Sparks' 17th studio album Plagiarism (1997) included two collaborations with Faith No More – "This Town Ain't Big Enough for Both of Us" and "Something for the Girl with Everything". Faith No More performed the song live during their 1997–1998 and reunion tours.
- In a deleted scene from The Sparks Brothers (2021), "Weird Al" Yankovic played the song instrumentally on an accordion.
- In August 2024, British baroque pop band the Last Dinner Party released a rendition of the song as the first single from the expanded version of their debut studio album Prelude to Ecstasy.

== In popular culture ==
The song appears in a dream sequence, in an episode of the British sitcom Green Wing. The original track is mimed by two of the characters, Dr. "Mac" Macartney and Dr Alan Statham, who pretend to be Russell and Ron Mael respectively.

The original Sparks version of the song is heard in the superhero black comedy film Kick-Ass (2010).

The song is used in episode 2 of Telltale's video game series Guardians of the Galaxy.

The song is used in Season 1, Episode 8 of American neo-Western crime drama television miniseries Justified: City Primeval in a scene with a confrontation between two characters.
