= Never Turn Your Back on Mother Earth =

Single by Sparks

from the album Propaganda
- B-side: "Alabamy Right"
- Released: 1974
- Recorded: 1974
- Genre: Glam rock; art rock; baroque pop
- Length: 2:28; 2:35 (re-recording)
- Label: Island
- Songwriter(s): Ron Mael
- Producer(s): Muff Winwood; Tony Visconti (re-recording)

Sparks singles chronology
"Amateur Hour" (1974)	"Never Turn Your Back on Mother Earth" (1974)	"Something for the Girl with Everything" (1975)

Licensed audio
- "Never Turn Your Back on Mother Earth" on YouTube

"Never Turn Your Back on Mother Earth" is a song by American rock band Sparks. The song was recorded by the band's mid-1970s glam line-up. It was released in late 1974 as the first single from the band's fourth studio album, Propaganda.

== Plagiarism re-recording ==
In 1997, Sparks recorded a new version of the song with the record producer Tony Visconti. This introduced strings and a choir. The song concludes their 17th studio album Plagiarism where it segues from out of the previous track, "The Number One Song in Heaven".

== Cover versions ==
English electronic band Depeche Mode recorded a cover version on a single-sided flexi disc which was sent to members of their official fan club for Christmas 1987. Martin Gore also recorded a cover version for his first solo extended play (EP), Counterfeit, in 1989.

French musician Nicola Sirkis covered the song as the B-side to his 1992 single "Alice dans la Lune", from his sole solo studio album Dans La Lune.

Johan Johansson created a Swedish version titled "Kärlek & Respekt Till Moder Jord" for his 1994 EP 10.

Karen J. Walsha recorded a version for the Dutch tribute album Amateur Hour (A Global Tribute to Sparks) released in 1999.

Scottish singer Billy Mackenzie of the Associates recorded a version which appeared on his posthumous solo studio album Transmission Impossible (2005).

English singer-songwriter Paul Roland recorded a version which appeared on his studio album Strychnine (2005).

Welsh singer Mary Hopkin recorded a version which appeared on her fourth studio album Valentine (2007).

American singer-songwriter Neko Case has a version on her fifth studio album Middle Cyclone (2009).

== Track listing ==
1. "Never Turn Your Back on Mother Earth" – 2:28
2. "Alabamy Right" – 2:11

== Personnel ==
Sparks

- Ron Mael – keyboards
- Russell Mael – vocals
- Trevor White – guitar
- Ian Hampton – bass guitar
- Norman "Dinky" Diamond – drums
- Adrian Fisher – guitar

== Chart positions ==
Chart	Peak position
UK Singles Chart	13
German Singles Chart	40
