= Aldershot Crematorium =

Crematorium in Hampshire, England

Coordinates: 51°13′56.8″N 0°44′40.1″W

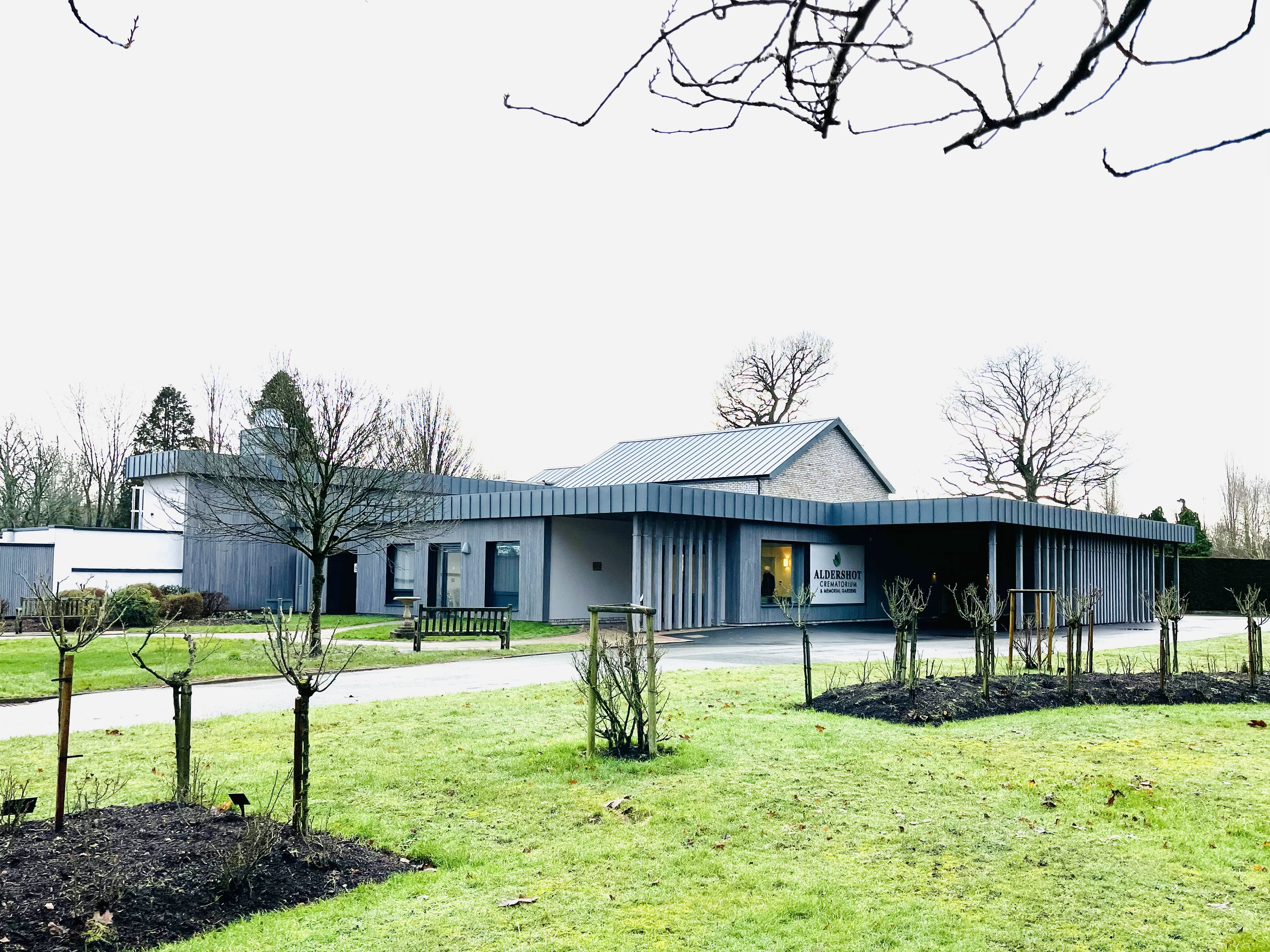
Aldershot Crematorium and Memorial Gardens in 2026

Aldershot Crematorium and Memorial Gardens, formerly Park Crematorium, serves the town of Aldershot in Hampshire, England, as well as surrounding areas, including Surrey and Berkshire. The original crematorium building was designed by Frank Taylor, the Aldershot Borough Surveyor, and opened in July 1960. It has undergone major refurbishments in 1997 and 2025.

Reopened in December 2025 after a £4.7 million major rebuilding and refurbishment, the crematorium is operated and maintained by Rushmoor Borough Council.

== Location and facilities ==
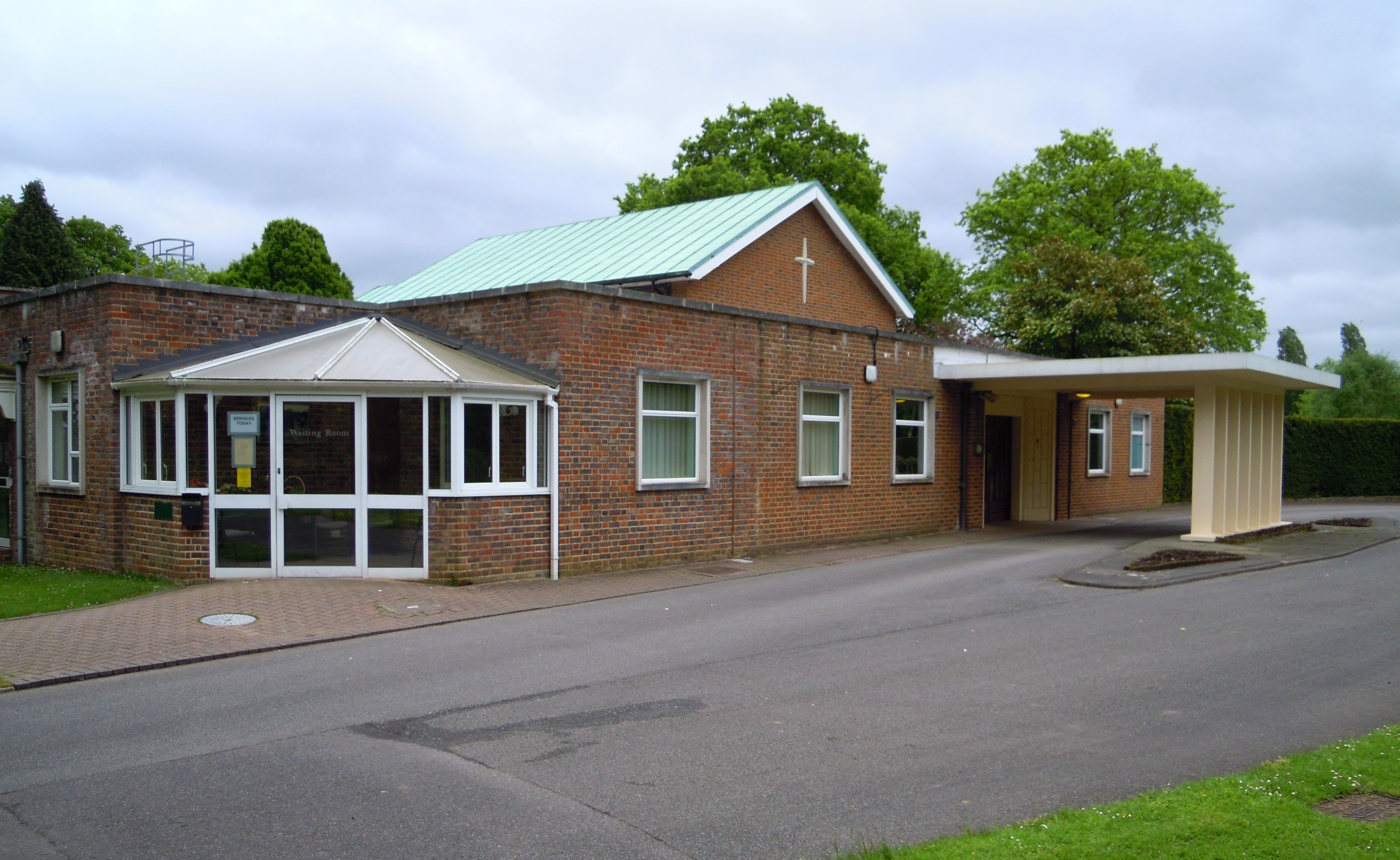
The former Park Crematorium in Aldershot

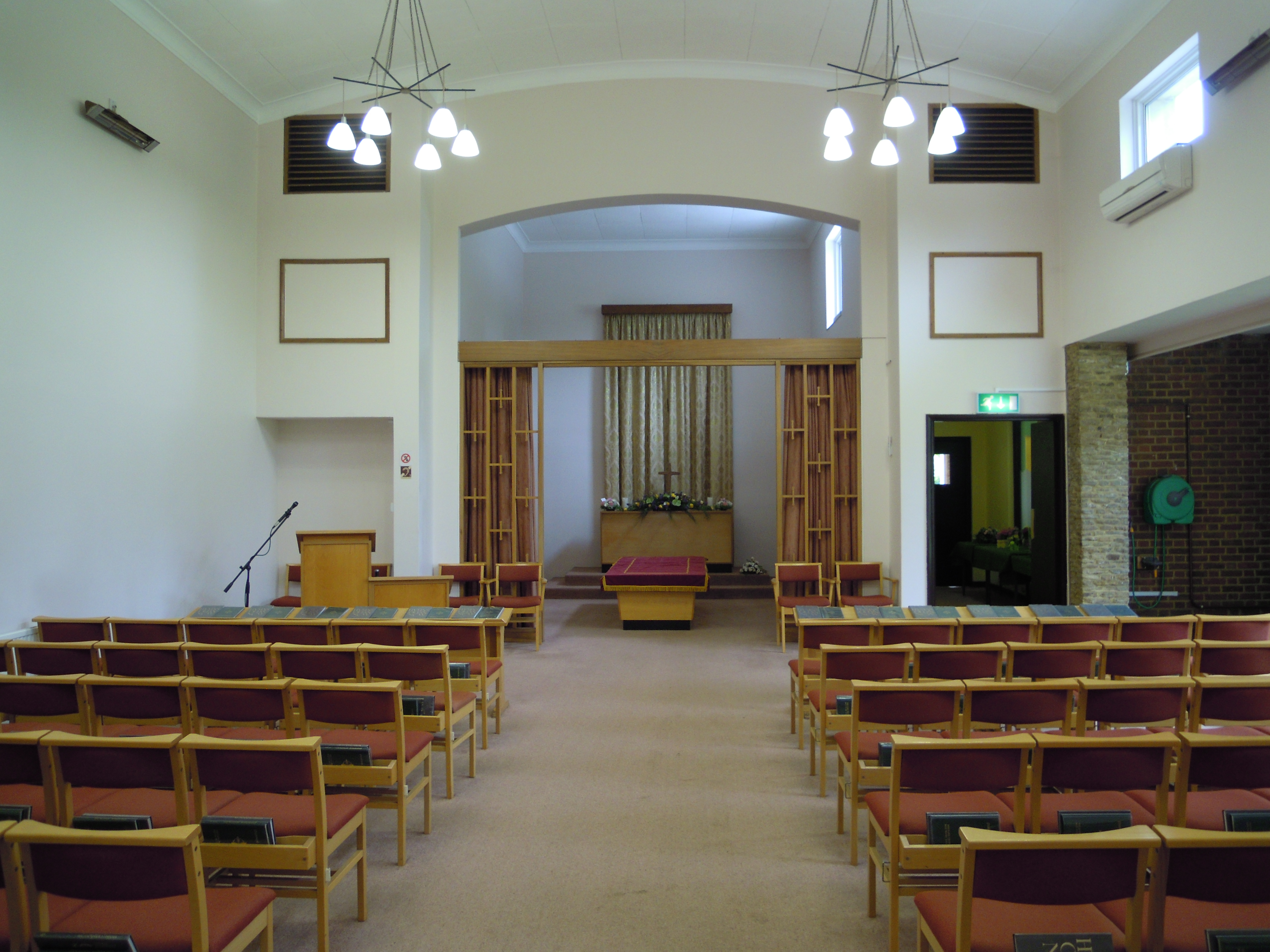
The former chapel at the crematorium

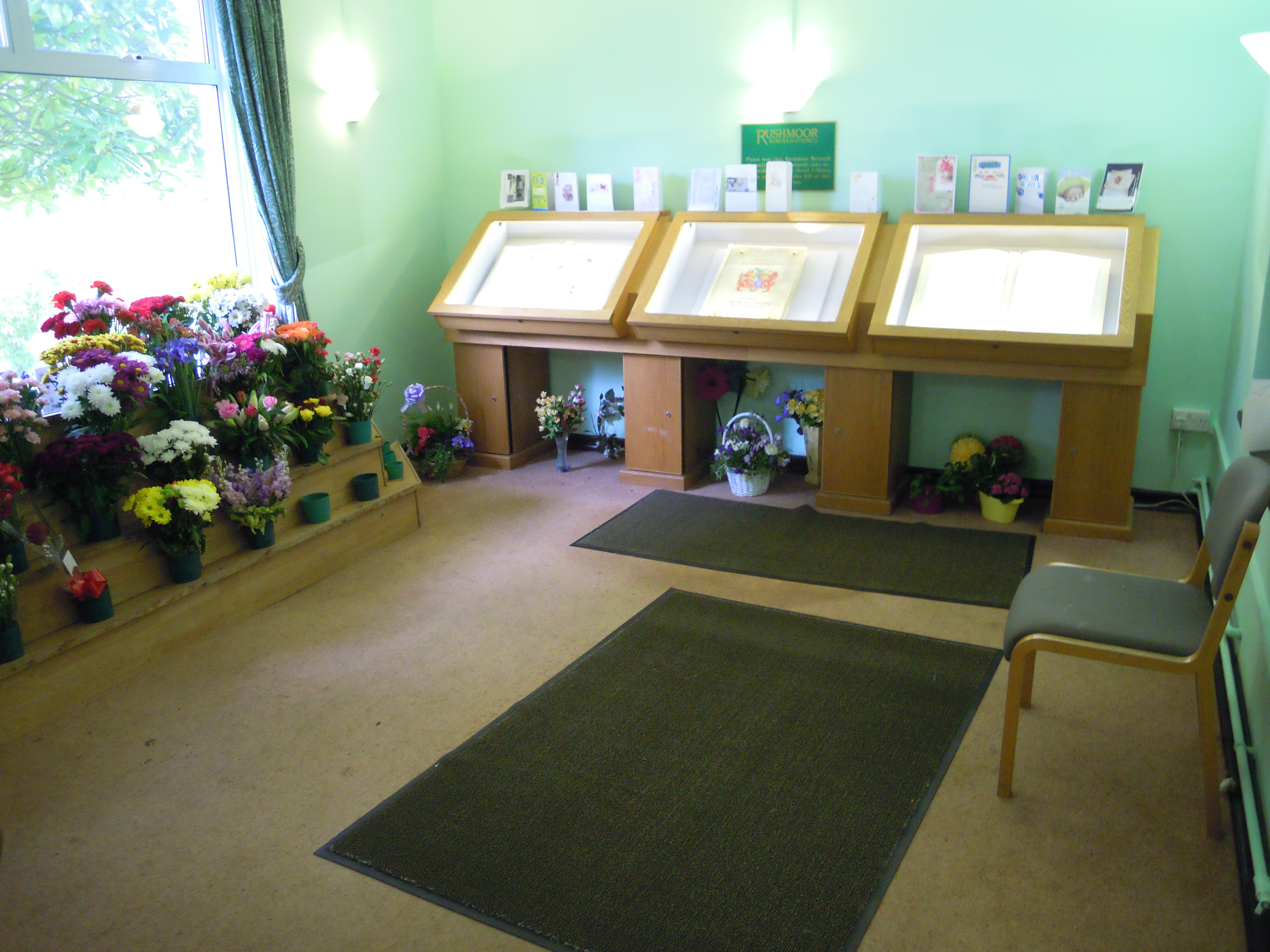
The Books of Remembrance

The crematorium is located near Aldershot Park and between Aldershot Cricket Club and Aldershot Lido. The facility has 16 acres of memorial grounds which were formerly called Kiln Copse, a woodland at the edge of Aldershot Park. Ashes can be interred in the memorial grounds.

The modern crematorium chapel can seat 100 people and has a picture window looking out over the memorial grounds. The building also includes a hall of remembrance containing the Books of Remembrance.

=== Poem by Sir John Betjeman ===
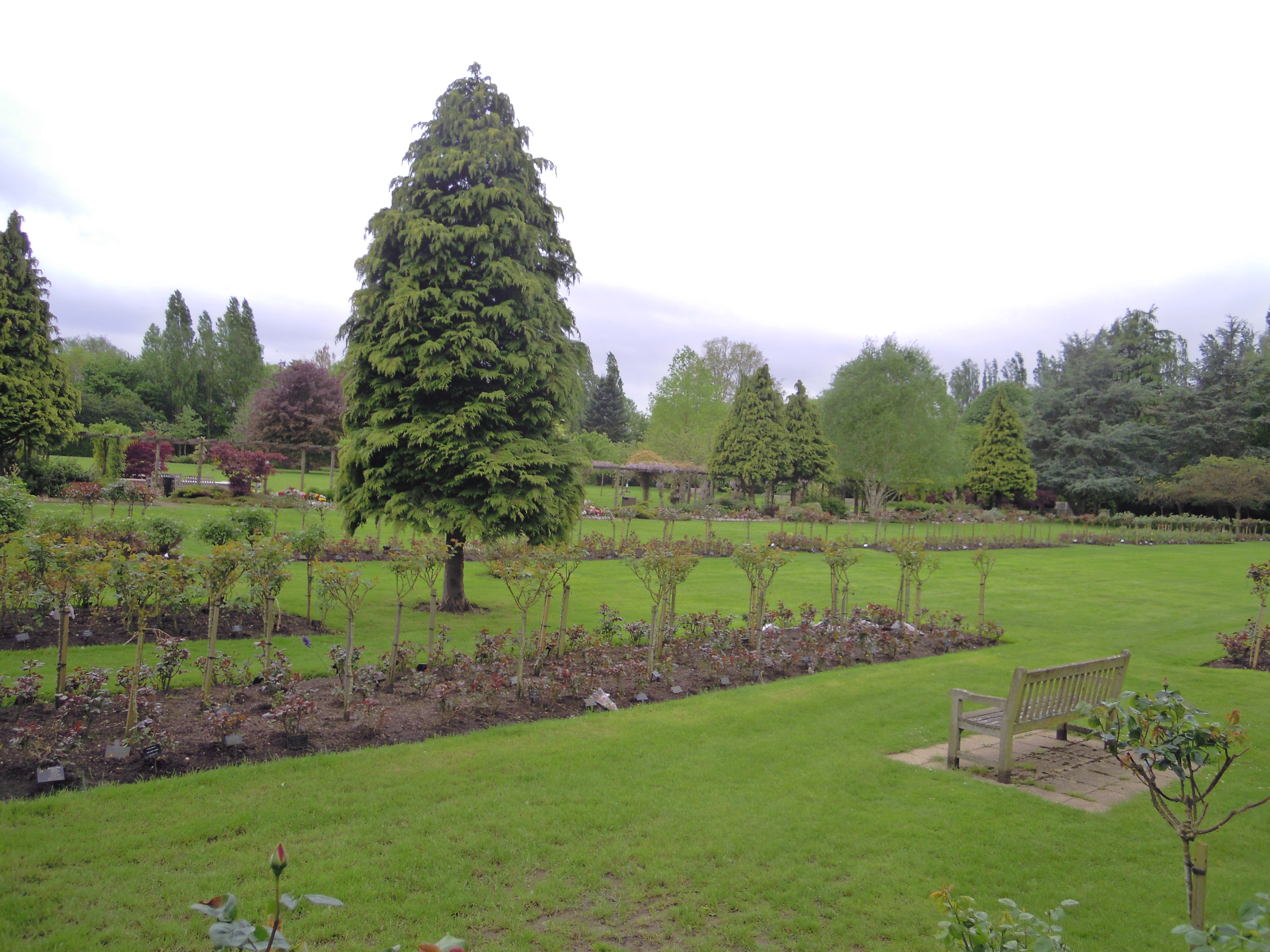
Section of the Gardens of Remembrance where ashes are interred

After the Poet Laureate John Betjeman attended a service there, he wrote the poem "Aldershot Crematorium":

Between the swimming-pool and cricket-ground
How straight the crematorium driveway lies!
And little puffs of smoke without a sound
Show what we loved dissolving in the skies,
Dear hands and feet and laughter-lighted face
And silk that hinted at the body's grace.

But no-one seems to know quite what to say
(Friends are so altered by the passing years):
"Well, anyhow, it's not so cold today"—
And thus we try to dissipate our fears.
'I am the Resurrection and the Life':
Strong, deep and painful, doubt inserts the knife.

== Refurbishment in 2025 ==
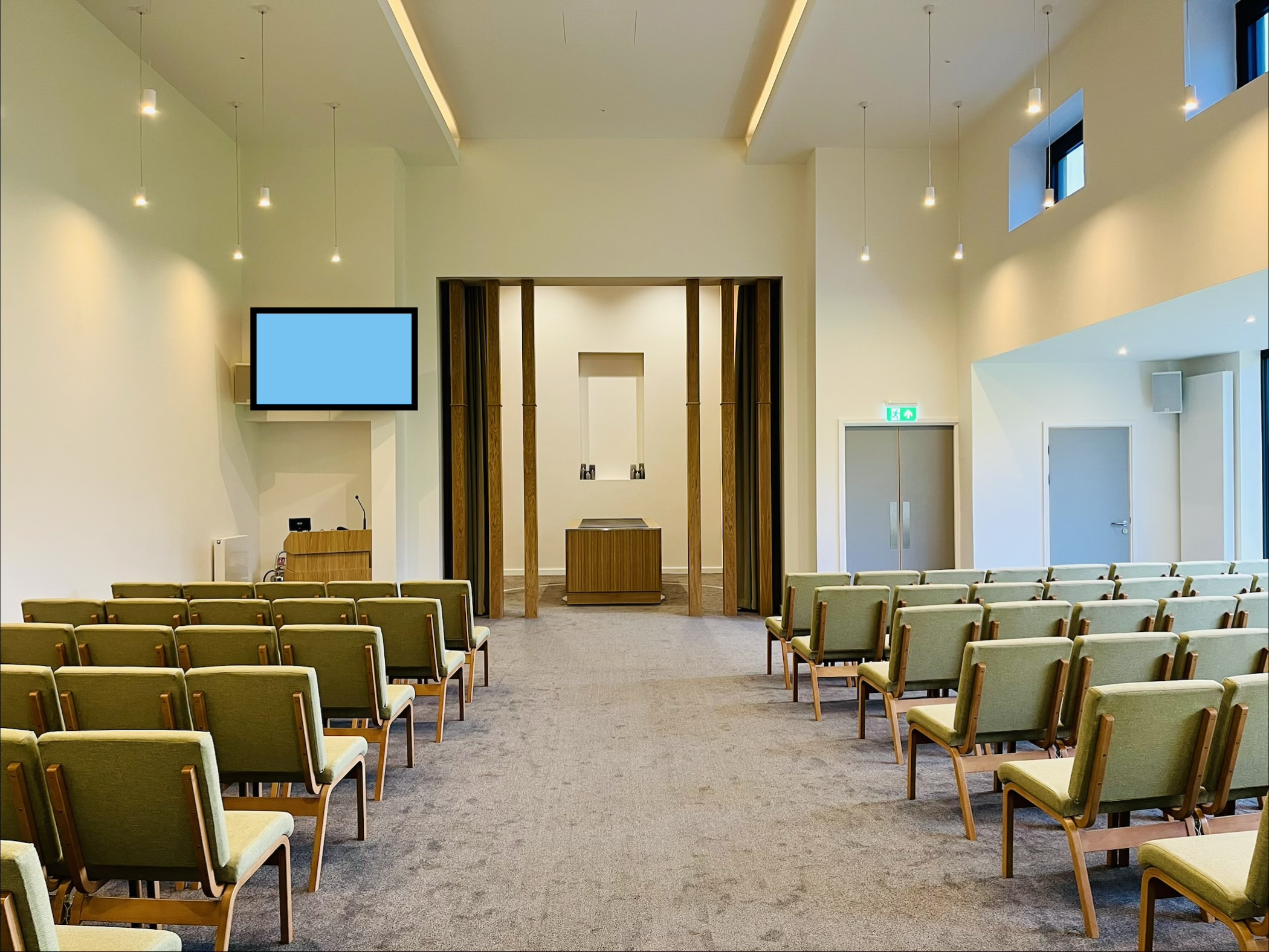
The refurbished chapel in 2026

In the years leading up to the refurbishment, improvement of the facilities at Aldershot Crematorium was needed. In 2023 the Office of National Statistics stated that the United Kingom's death rate is likely to "increase significantly over the next 50 years, placing additional demand on crematoria nationally for the foreseeable future." At the same time, the number of people living in Rushmoor is also forecast to increase in the coming years, with the number of residents aged over 65 likely to be much higher than the national average owing to the number of elderly Nepali people living in the Borough. In addition, the number of cremations taking place at Aldershot was decreasing annually, probably because the facilities at the town's crematorium were limited and ageing, and major investment was needed to make Aldershot Crematorium competitive with others in the area.

In 2025, Aldershot Crematorium underwent a major refurbishment, which included the installation of a second cremator, a new roof, external cladding, extending the covered entrance, and improving access for people with disabilities. There is also improved insulation and solar panels.

At the reopening ceremony on 18 December 2025, Councillor Christine Guinness, Cabinet Member for Pride in Place and Neighbourhood Services at Rushmoor Borough Council said:

Aldershot Crematorium is such an important local facility which has been part of our community since 1960, supporting not only the residents of Aldershot and Farnborough, but also the wider area. I am delighted to see it refurbished with so much care and attention.

== Notable cremations ==
Memorial to Arthur English at the Park Crematorium

- Pauline Baynes, illustrator, author and commercial artist who was the first illustrator of some of J. R. R. Tolkien's minor works and of C. S. Lewis's Chronicles of Narnia.
- Arthur English, comedian, was cremated here and his ashes buried in the crematorium gardens with those of his first wife.
- Norman "Dinky" Diamond, born in Aldershot, drummer in the 1970s with the band Sparks was cremated here.
- Frederick "Freddie" Hurrell, Air Vice-Marshal and Director-General of the RAF Medical Services from 1986 to 1988.

== See also ==
- Aldershot Military Cemetery
- Aldershot Cemetery, the town's civil cemetery
