= Amateur Hour (song) =

- German 7" single

Single by Sparks

from the album Kimono My House
- B-side: "Lost and Found"
- Released: 1974
- Genre: Glam rock; bubblegum
- Length: 3:37
- Label: Island
- Songwriter: Ron Mael
- Producer: Muff Winwood

Sparks singles chronology
"This Town Ain't Big Enough for Both of Us" (1974)	"Amateur Hour" (1974)	"Never Turn Your Back on Mother Earth" (1974)

Licensed audio
- "Amateur Hour" on YouTube

"Amateur Hour" is a song by American rock band Sparks. It was released as the second single, released by Island Records, from their third studio album Kimono My House (1974). Bassist Martin Gordon was requested to replace his original bass part (recorded using a Rickenbacker 4001 bass) with a Fender Precision Bass, belonging to his subsequent replacement in the band.

A re-recording was produced in 1997 for their 17th studio album Plagiarism. This new version was given a complete electronic synth-pop overhaul and was performed with English duo Erasure.

On 25 June 2009, the song "Amateur Hour" was featured in a stunt when UK magician and mentalist Mark Cairns predicted that radio personality George Lamb would choose the Sparks song, in a free choice from a list of 100 tracks that had been recently played on Lamb's BBC Radio 6 Music show.

== Track listing ==
1. "Amateur Hour" – 3:37
2. "Lost and Found" – 3:21

== Personnel ==
Sparks

- Russell Mael – vocals
- Ron Mael – keyboards
- Martin Gordon – bass guitar
- Adrian Fisher – guitar
- Norman "Dinky" Diamond – drums

== Chart positions ==
Chart	Peak position
UK singles chart	7
German Singles Chart	12
Irish Singles Chart	19
