= Introducing Sparks =

Studio album by Sparks
- Released: October 1977
- Recorded: 1977
- Studio: Larrabee Sound, Los Angeles
- Genre: Pop rock
- Length: 35:58
- Label: Columbia (US), CBS (UK)
- Producer: Jimmy Ienner; Terry Powell; Ron Mael; Russell Mael

Sparks chronology
Big Beat (1976)	Introducing Sparks (1977)	Nº 1 in Heaven (1979)

Rear cover

Singles from Introducing Sparks
- 1. "Over the Summer" Released: August 1977; 2. "A Big Surprise" Released: September 1977 (UK)

Introducing Sparks is the seventh studio album by the American rock band Sparks, released in 1977 by Columbia Records.

== Release ==
The album proved to be a commercial failure, and many other very negative reviews claimed that the band had adopted a new East Coast "American sound" despite the fact that the Mael brothers are indeed Americans. The title is also rather ironic – Introducing Sparks was not only not their first album, it wasn't even the first for their label, Columbia (it was their second and, furthering the irony, their last).

Introducing Sparks was no more a success in terms of chart performance than their previous album Big Beat. It did not chart in the UK or US. The singles "Over the Summer" and "A Big Surprise" each backed with "Forever Young" were released singles but failed to gain any significant sales or radio play. For decades the album remained obscure, in part because it remained unavailable on CD until 2007. However, in recent years the album has enjoyed a certain critical reassessment leading some critics to appreciate Introducing Sparks as a much overlooked album.

== Critical reception ==
Professional ratings
Review scores
Source	Rating
AllMusic	(Note: The AllMusic review has since been updated from a rating of two stars out of five.)
Christgau's Record Guide	B
Omaha World-Herald	2.5/5 stars

At the time of its release, Pete Makowski in Sounds suggested that the album was "probably the most adventurous musical outing yet" from Sparks, suggesting that Ron Mael "is one of the most underrated and original lyricists in the galaxy." Reviewing in Christgau's Record Guide: Rock Albums of the Seventies (1981), Robert Christgau wrote, "On its five albums for Bearsville and Island, this skillful brother act compounded personal hatefulness with a deliberately tense and uninviting take on pop-rock. But with their Columbia debut, Big Beat, they began to loosen up, and here one cut actually makes surf music history, in the tending-to-hyperconsciousness section. This is tuneful, funny, even open. But the fear of women and the stubborn, spoiled-teenager cynicism is still there, and it's still hateful." Dave Thompson of AllMusic said of the album, "it is hard to visualize any album ever being more disappointing than this one," and praising the track "Over the Summer" as "one of the greatest Beach Boys pastiches ever recorded," while opining "we don't look to Sparks for pastiche".

== Re-release ==
Apart from its initial release in 1977 Introducing Sparks was unavailable for many years. For a time it was previously the only Sparks album only released on vinyl (though bootlegs were available on CD). This was in part because Columbia Records held the rights, and while they had released Big Beat, that album had been released by Island Records in the UK and they had since taken up the option of re-releasing it in 1994. Therefore, there was little impetus for Columbia to release just one album rather than a number which could benefit the sales of one another like Island had.

Due to its commercial and critical failure, Introducing Sparks faded into obscurity. This was rectified in November 2007, when the album was officially re-released on CD on Sparks' own record label, Lil' Beethoven Records. However, the CD was not remastered from the original studio master tapes owned by Sony, but was mastered from a vinyl LP because of rights issues preventing access to the original masters. The album was later re-released again in Japan on SHM-CD, touted as a superior sounding CD format, the same vinyl remaster was still used.

In 2014, a fan posted online that they had discovered a 1/4" 4-track 7-inch 7.5ips reel to reel tape of a quadraphonic mix of 'Introducing Sparks' which revealed a possible early incarnation of the album. The tape contained 8 songs, including two fully produced unreleased songs "Kidnap" and "Keep Me", but excluded three songs from the final album release ("Forever Young", "Girls on the Brain" and "Over the Summer"). All songs had countdown intros and cold stops instead of fade outs. This version also appeared to be an early mix, as some sounds were either missing from the songs or mixed differently. In particular there is the addition of background conversation opening, closing, and running throughout the song, "Goofing Off".

== Track listing ==
All tracks are written by Ron Mael and Russell Mael.

Side one
No.	Title	Length
1.	"A Big Surprise"	3:42
2.	"Occupation"	5:17
3.	"Ladies"	3:06
4.	"I'm Not"	3:26
5.	"Forever Young"	3:27

Side two
No.	Title	Length
6.	"Goofing Off"	4:26
7.	"Girls on the Brain"	3:41
8.	"Over the Summer"	3:50
9.	"Those Mysteries"	5:03
Total length:		35:58

Imperial Records (Japan) bonus tracks (2009)
No.	Title	Length
10.	"Breathe" (Unreleased Demo)	3:14
11.	"Fact or Fiction" (Unreleased Demo)	3:26
12.	"Those Mysteries" (Demo Version)	3:40
Total length:		46:18

== Personnel ==
Sparks

- Russell Mael - lead and backing vocals
- Ron Mael - keyboards
Backing vocalists

- Tom Bahler
- Al Capps
- Stan Farber
- Jim Haas
- Ron Hicklin
- Mark Piscitelli
- Nick Uhrig

Additional musicians

- Alan Broadbent
- Ben Benay
- David Foster
- Ed Greene
- David Paich
- Mike Porcaro
- Reinie Press
- Lee Ritenour
- Thom Rotella

== Production ==
- Lenny Roberts – engineering
- Betsy Banghart and Randy Tominaga – assistant engineers
- Al Capps and Ron Mael – arrangements
- Bob Seidemann – photography
- John Kehe, Tommy Steele – design
- Licensed from Island Records Limited, London
- Mastered at Allen Zentz
- Recorded at Larrabee Sound, Los Angeles
