= Terminal Jive =

Studio album by Sparks
- Released: January 28, 1980
- Recorded: 1979
- Genre: New wave
- Length: 35:55
- Label: Virgin
- Producer: Giorgio Moroder; Harold Faltermeyer

Sparks chronology
Nº 1 in Heaven (1979)	Terminal Jive (1980)	Whomp That Sucker (1981)

Singles from Terminal Jive
- 1. "When I'm with You" Released: January 1980; 2. "Young Girls" Released: May 1980

Professional ratings
Review scores
Source	Rating
AllMusic	4/5 stars
Smash Hits	9/10

Terminal Jive is the ninth studio album by the American rock band Sparks and the second recorded with Giorgio Moroder. The album has a disco-vibe like its predecessor but featured fewer synthesizers, opting instead for more electric rock guitar, resulting in a new wave sound. The album was produced by Moroder and Harold Faltermeyer, the latter of whom is claimed to have produced the majority of the album.

Sparks scored a hit single in France with "When I'm with You", which led to them staying in the country for a year promoting the album.

== Release ==
Terminal Jive was not released in the US, although Polydor Records issued it in Canada. It was also not a success in the UK. However, it fared better in continental Europe.

The lead single "When I'm with You" was a hit in France where it reached #16. The single also hit the Top 20 in Australia, reaching #14. The second single from the album was "Young Girls", it too performed well in France. "Young Girls" was released with an extended remix on 12", an edited version on the 7" single, and backed with "Just Because You Love Me". French releases included "Rock 'n' Roll People in a Disco World", since "Just Because You Love Me" had accompanied the release of "When I'm with You" in that territory already.

== Cover art ==
The album's artwork features various poses of the Mael brothers in odd postures in and around Hamleys toy store in Regent Street, London.

== Track listing ==
All tracks are written by Ron Mael and Russell Mael; except where indicated.

Side one
No.	Title	Length
1.	"When I'm with You"	5:45
2.	"Just Because You Love Me"	4:36
3.	"Rock 'n' Roll People in a Disco World"	4:47
4.	"When I'm with You (Instrumental)"	3:45

Side two
No.	Title	Writer(s)	Length
5.	"Young Girls"		4:49
6.	"Noisy Boys"	Harold Faltermeyer, Keith Forsey, Mael, Mael	3:55
7.	"Stereo"	Giorgio Moroder, Mael, Mael	4:01
8.	"The Greatest Show on Earth"	Moroder, Faltermeyer, Mael, Mael	4:17
Total length:			35:55

Imperial Records (Japan) bonus tracks (2009)
No.	Title	Length
9.	"The Farmer's Daughter (Unreleased Demo)"	4:03
10.	"After Dark (Unreleased Demo)"	3:30
11.	"Modesty Plays (Instrumental Version)"	3:10

Repertoire Records bonus tracks (2013)
No.	Title	Length
9.	"When I'm With You (Single Version)"	3:54
10.	"Young Girls (Single Version)"	3:51
11.	"Young Girls (Disco Version)"	6:11

== Personnel ==
Musicians

- Russell Mael – vocals
- Ron Mael – keyboards
- W. G. Snuffy Walden – guitar
- Richie Zito – bass guitar
- Harold Faltermeyer – keyboards
- Keith Forsey – drums
- Laurie Forsey – backing vocals

Technical

- Giorgio Moroder – production
- Harold Faltermeyer – production
- Brian Reeves, Dennis Drake – engineer
- Gered Mankowitz – photography

== Charts ==
Chart (1980)	Peak position
Australia (Kent Music Report)	96
