= When I'm with You (Sparks song) =

Single by Sparks

from the album Terminal Jive
- B-side: "When I'm with You" (instrumental)
- Released: 1980
- Recorded: 1979
- Genre: Disco; new wave; rock
- Length: 5:45
- Label: Atlantic
- Songwriters: Ron Mael; Russell Mael
- Producer: Giorgio Moroder or Harold Faltermeyer (disputed)

Sparks singles chronology
"Beat the Clock" (1979)	"When I'm with You" (1980)	"Young Girls" (1980)

Music video
- "When I'm with You" on YouTube

"When I'm with You" is a song released by American rock and pop duo Sparks. The song relies on disco and new wave as its two main genres with rock guitars audible throughout the song. The song did not chart on any U.S. Billboard charts, but was Sparks' only Top 40 single in Australia, where it peaked at No. 14, whilst it peaked at No. 1 in France for six weeks. It is not known who produced this song as Giorgio Moroder produced it alongside Harold Faltermeyer, with the latter claiming to have produced much of the album. Keith Forsey, best known as producer for Billy Idol in the 1980s and then resuming in 2006, and for writing several other works including "Don't You (Forget About Me)" and "Flashdance... What a Feeling" among others, played drums on the song. The B-side is an instrumental version of "When I'm with You".

== Personnel ==
The following are purported to be on the song.

Sparks

- Russell Mael – vocals
- Ron Mael – keyboards

Additional musicians

- W. G. Snuffy Walden – guitar
- Richie Zito – bass guitar
- Harold Faltermeyer – keyboards
- Keith Forsey – drums
- Laurie Forsey – backing vocals

== Charts ==
=== Weekly charts ===
Weekly chart performance for "When I'm with You"
Chart (1980)	Peak position
Australia (Kent Music Report)	14
France (IFOP)	1

=== Year-end charts ===
Year-end chart performance for "When I'm with You"
Chart (1980)	Position
Australia (Kent Music Report)	93
France (Institut français d'opinion publique)	22
