= Norman "Dinky" Diamond =

British drummer (1950-2004)

Dinky Diamond
- Diamond playing with Sparks in 1974

Background information
- Born: Norman Victor Diamond; 15 December 1950; Aldershot, Hampshire, England
- Died: 10 September 2004 (aged 53)
- Occupation: Musician
- Instrument: Drums
- Years active: 1974–1981
- Label: Island
- Formerly of: Sparks; The Four Squares

Norman Victor "Dinky" Diamond (15 December 1950 – 10 September 2004) was an English drummer who played with the rock band Sparks at the height of their fame in the UK in the early 1970s, playing on the albums Kimono My House (1974), Propaganda (1974) and Indiscreet (1975). In 1975 Diamond was voted Drummer of the Year in a poll held by Premier Drums. He committed suicide by hanging in 2004 after a long-running dispute with noisy neighbours.

== Early years ==
Born in Aldershot in Hampshire, on 15 December 1950, the son of Isabella (née Copland) and Albert Victor Diamond, Norman Diamond gained the nickname "Dinky" as a child because of his small stature. He had three sisters, Maureen, Daphne and Margaret and a brother, David and attended St. Michael's Church of England Secondary School in Aldershot. A self-taught drummer, Diamond played in a variety of local bands including Sound of Time in his native town while working in electrical distribution.

== Sparks 1973–1975 ==
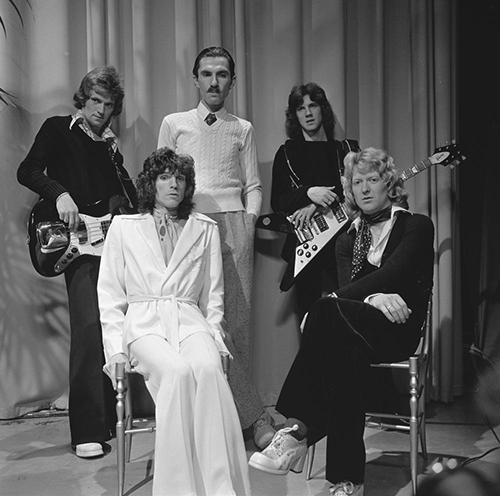
Sparks in 1974, left to right: Ian Hampton, Russell Mael, Ron Mael, Adrian Fisher and Diamond.

Founding members of Sparks, the brothers Ron and Russell Mael, moved to England in 1973 with a new manager, John Hewlett, founder of John's Children, and a deal from Island Records, thanks in part to the exposure garnered by a BBC2 television The Old Grey Whistle Test performance. The Mael brothers placed an advertisement in music weekly Melody Maker which read: "Wanted bass player for Sparks. Must be beard free and exciting". As a result, Martin Gordon was hired. With Adrian Fisher on guitar and Diamond on drums, in the midst of power strikes and a threatened vinyl shortage, they recorded their breakthrough Kimono My House in 1974, scoring a number 2 hit with the single "This Town Ain't Big Enough for Both of Us". Remembering Diamond's early years with Sparks, producer Muff Winwood said "Dinky was by no means a great drummer but he suited the material perfectly".

Sparks became a UK teen sensation, appearing on the cover of Melody Maker, Record Mirror and many other pop magazines, both in the UK and Europe. Hits such as "This Town Ain't Big Enough for Both of Us", "Amateur Hour" and "Never Turn Your Back on Mother Earth" led to many appearances on the BBC's flagship music show Top of the Pops.

Gordon and Fisher were later replaced, but Diamond temporarily survived the cull. In 1975 the revised band, including Diamond, toured the US promoting the Kimono My House and Propaganda albums. Diamond had enjoyed being a member of a high-profile band, and would sit in the office at Island Records, answering the telephones and reading paperwork.

== After Sparks, Four Squares ==
Diamond was voted Drummer of the Year in a poll held by Premier Drums in 1975. However, that was also his last year with Sparks as the Mael brothers decided to move back to the US and there they would be using mainly local session musicians. Diamond's departure from Sparks affected him badly, but he went on to appear with a number of bands, including (from 1980) the Sparks spin-off The Four Squares. Despite the name, the band actually had five members: Diamond on drums, Sparks' former manager John Hewlett on vocals, former Sparks guitarist Trevor White on bass, and two guitarists – Adrian Fisher plus Chuck Wagon (also of The Dickies) who shot himself before the band's main recording session at Bearsville Studios were complete.

== Personal life and death ==
At the office at Island Records, he met Lee Packham, secretary to Kimono My House producer Muff Winwood. The couple married in 1976. Diamond developed a serious drinking problem and the marriage broke down. The couple later divorced and Lee died in 1994.

When the Four Squares failed, Diamond gradually drifted out of music and after a series of jobs, in 1998 he and his partner of 21 years Jane Gant moved into a small terraced house in Sandhurst in Berkshire, where he was troubled for five years by a noisy neighbour and her partner, who slept all day and played loud music all night and who argued loudly in the street. At the same time Diamond left a job he enjoyed and took one which he hated, working for an internet gardening company.

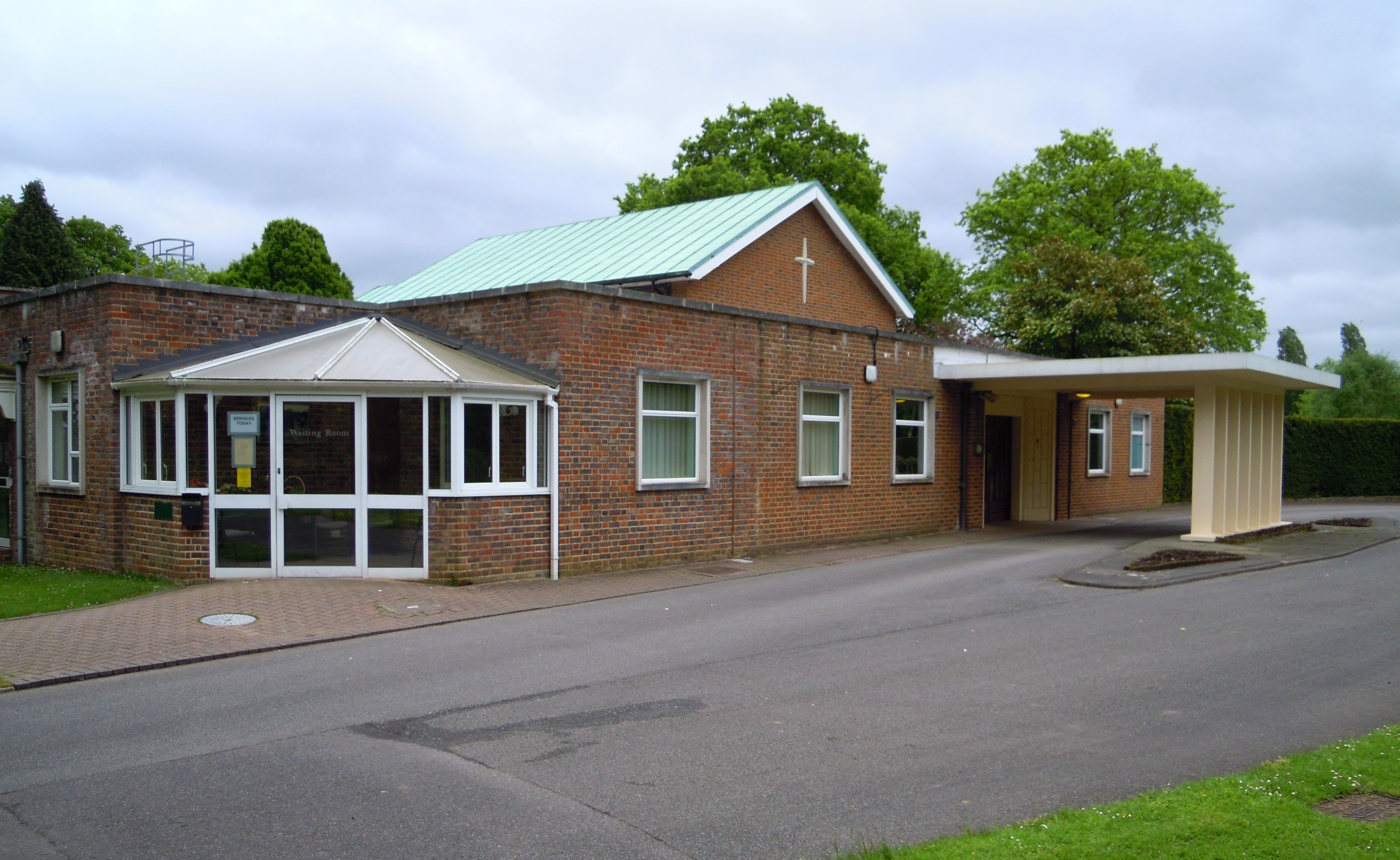
Diamond was cremated at Aldershot Crematorium

When the police and local housing association did not take action against the neighbour, despite numerous complaints, Diamond got drunk and hanged himself from the loft ceiling in his home on 10 September 2004. News of his death was only made widely known five months later when the verdict of suicide was confirmed at inquest. A heavy drinker, he had more than four times the legal driving limit of alcohol in his blood. The neighbour, Lisa Norman's partner said, "He [Mr Diamond] had a history of alcohol abuse, and all the blame is being concentrated on my partner; she is distraught."

The Mael brothers posted a tribute to Diamond on the Sparks website:

"We are very saddened by the news of Dinky Diamond's death. We hold fond memories of working with Dinky and of his contribution to several of our albums during the '70s. Our hearts go out to his family and friends."

Diamond's funeral was held at Aldershot Crematorium.
