= Indiscreet (Sparks album) =

Studio album by Sparks
- Released: October 1975
- Recorded: 1975
- Studios: Tony Visconti's home studio, Melrose Terrace, Hammersmith, London
- Genres: Glam rock; art pop; power pop
- Length: 41:32
- Label: Island
- Producer: Tony Visconti

Sparks chronology
Propaganda (1974)	Indiscreet (1975)	Big Beat (1976)

Singles from Indiscreet
- 1. "Get in the Swing" Released: July 1975; 2. "Looks, Looks, Looks" Released: September 1975

Indiscreet is the fifth studio album by Sparks, released in October 1975 by Island Records. While retaining the glam rock sound of Kimono My House and Propaganda, the album emphasised the theatrical elements of their work, with greater use of orchestral arrangements and drawing from non-rock orientated styles such as jazz, big band, swing, vaudeville, and classical music. The album was produced by Tony Visconti, with whom the group reunited in 1997 to produce several tracks for their retrospective album Plagiarism. The song "How Are You Getting Home?" was used in Leos Carax's film Holy Motors.

== Release ==
Professional ratings
Review scores
Source	Rating
AllMusic	4/5 stars
Classic Rock	8/10 stars

Indiscreet was released in October 1975, nearly a year after Sparks' previous album and would be the third album recorded with a British-based line-up. It was not as successful as Kimono My House or Propaganda; reaching No. 18 on the UK Albums Chart The group's next two albums were even less successful in Europe and the US. They would not garner significant attention until 1979's No. 1 In Heaven.

"Get in the Swing" and "Looks, Looks, Looks" were released as singles. Like the parent album they were only moderately successful, reaching No. 27 and No. 26 respectively in the UK Singles Chart, which resulted in the Mael brothers splitting up the British-based version of Sparks and returning home to America.

== Re-releases ==
Indiscreet was re-issued and remastered by Island in 1994 and 2006. The first issue by the Island Masters subsidiary added the B-side "Profile" and the non-album single "I Wanna Hold Your Hand", and its B-side "England". The 21st Century Edition did not include either "I Wanna Hold Your Hand" or "England"; in their stead it included the rare "The Wedding of Jacqueline Kennedy to Russell Mael" and a live recording of "Looks, Looks, Looks".

== Track listing ==
All tracks are written by Ron Mael, except where indicated.

Side one
No.	Title	Length
1.	"Hospitality on Parade"	4:00
2.	"Happy Hunting Ground"	3:44
3.	"Without Using Hands"	3:20
4.	"Get in the Swing"	4:08
5.	"Under the Table with Her"	2:20
6.	"How Are You Getting Home?"	2:57

Side two
No.	Title	Writer(s)	Length
7.	"Pineapple"	Russell Mael	2:45
8.	"Tits"		4:57
9.	"It Ain't 1918"		2:08
10.	"The Lady Is Lingering"		3:40
11.	"In the Future"		2:12
12.	"Looks, Looks, Looks"		2:35
13.	"Miss the Start, Miss the End"		2:46
Total length:			41:32

Island Masters bonus tracks (1994)
No.	Title	Writer(s)	Length
14.	"Profile"		3:30
15.	"I Wanna Hold Your Hand"	John Lennon; Paul McCartney	2:54
16.	"England"		3:16
Total length:			51:12

21st Century Edition bonus tracks (2006)
No.	Title	Writer(s)	Length
14.	"Profile"		3:30
15.	"The Wedding of Jacqueline Kennedy to Russell Mael"	Russell Mael	1:36
16.	"Looks, Looks, Looks" (live at Fairfield Halls, 09/11/75)		4:02
Total length:			50:40

== Personnel ==
Sparks

- Russell Mael – vocals
- Ron Mael – keyboards
- Ian Hampton – bass
- Trevor White – guitar
- Norman "Dinky" Diamond – drums

Additional

- Mike Piggott – fiddle on "It Ain't 1918"
- Tony Visconti – orchestral arrangements

== Charts ==
=== Album ===
Chart (1975/76)	Peak position
Canada Top Albums/CDs (RPM)	86
Dutch Albums (Album Top 100)	19
Norwegian Albums (VG-lista)	18
Swedish Albums (Sverigetopplistan)	6
UK Albums (Official Charts)	18
US Billboard 200	169

=== Singles ===
"Get in the Swing"
Chart (1975)	Peak position
Belgium (Ultratop 50 Wallonia)	38
UK Singles (OCC)	27

"Looks, Looks, Looks"
Chart (1975)	Peak position
Netherlands (Dutch Top 40) (Note: "Looks, Looks, Looks" peaked at no. 19 on the Dutch Top 40 Tipparade, which measures songs that fall below the threshold of a top 40 hit.)	59
UK Singles (OCC)	26
