= Big Beat (album) =

Studio album by Sparks
- Released: October 1976
- Recorded: August 1976
- Studio: Mediasound, New York City
- Genre: Glam rock; hard rock
- Length: 35:30
- Label: Columbia (US), Island (UK)
- Producer: Rupert Holmes; Jeffrey Lesser for Widescreen Productions

Sparks chronology
Indiscreet (1975)	Big Beat (1976)	Introducing Sparks (1977)

Singles from Big Beat
- 1. "Big Boy" Released: October 1976; 2. "I Like Girls" Released: December 1976

Professional ratings
Review scores
Source	Rating
AllMusic	4/5 stars
Classic Rock	6/10 stars

Big Beat is the sixth studio album by American rock band Sparks, released in 1976.

== History ==
Big Beat was recorded at Mediasound Studios, New York City in August 1976. The album was the group's first album after breaking away from their English backing band and returning to America. Instead, the Mael Brothers used session musicians and hired former Milk 'N' Cookies bassist, and Roxy Music contributor (Viva!), Sal Maida on bass, Tuff Darts guitarist Jeffrey Salen and Hilly Boy Michaels on drums. The release was their first for Columbia Records in the US. The album employed a much heavier and harder rock sound. Initially, the Mael brothers had returned to work with the early Sparks member Earle Mankey. Together, they recorded the song "England", a song which bore much in common with the jaunty home-made and unusual sound that the three musicians had made together in the early 1970s. Conversely, Rupert Holmes and Jeffrey Lesser's production on the album was slicker and more direct and the resulting album displayed a more "American" AOR sound. This new "West Coast" sound was deemed a failure as Sparks felt the results were "bereft of personality".

The final track on the album was a re-recording of "I Like Girls". The song had been a live favourite from their pre-1974 days. Versions of the song had previously been recorded in 1973 and again in 1974, but both takes were deemed unsatisfactory. The 1973 recording of "I Like Girls" was later included on the 1991 Rhino Entertainment compilation Profile: The Ultimate Sparks Collection.

The lead single, "Big Boy", and its B-side, "Fill-er-up", were performed for a cameo appearance in the 1977 disaster film Rollercoaster, after Kiss turned down the role.

== Release ==
Big Beat was not a success in terms of chart performance and failed to match the performance of the group's previous three albums. While it did not chart in the UK or US, however, it managed to chart in Sweden for two weeks, peaking at no. 24.

"Big Boy" and "I Like Girls" were released as singles but neither picked up any significant sales or radio play.

== Re-release ==
Big Beat was reissued by Island in 1994 and remastered in 2006. The first issue by the Island Masters subsidiary added "Tearing The Place Apart" and Russell Mael's "Gone with the Wind", both of which were recorded during the sessions for the Indiscreet album but went unreleased until "The Best of Sparks" compilation LP in 1978. The '21st Century Edition' added the non-album single "I Want to Hold Your Hand", its B-side, "England", and two previously unreleased tracks; "Looks Aren't Everything" and "Intrusion/Confusion". The latter is an early recording of "Confusion".

== Track listing ==
All tracks are written by Ron Mael except as indicated.

Side one
No.	Title	Length
1.	"Big Boy"	3:30
2.	"I Want to Be Like Everybody Else"	2:57
3.	"Nothing to Do"	3:09
4.	"I Bought the Mississippi River"	2:29
5.	"Fill-er-up"	2:20
6.	"Everybody's Stupid"	3:41

Side two
No.	Title	Length
7.	"Throw Her Away (And Get a New One)"	3:15
8.	"Confusion"	3:27
9.	"Screwed Up"	4:20
10.	"White Women"	3:24
11.	"I Like Girls"	2:58

Island Masters bonus tracks (1994)
No.	Title	Writer(s)	Length
12.	"Tearing the Place Apart"		3:38
13.	"Gone with the Wind"	Russell Mael	3:07

21st Century Edition bonus tracks (2006)
No.	Title	Writer(s)	Length
12.	"I Want to Hold Your Hand"	John Lennon and Paul McCartney	2:56
13.	"England"		3:18
14.	"Gone with the Wind"	Russell Mael	3:07
15.	"Intrusion/Confusion"		2:47
16.	"Looks Aren't Everything"		3:28
17.	"Tearing the Place Apart"		3:38

== Personnel ==
- Russell Mael - Vocals
- Ron Mael - Keyboards
- Sal Maida - Bass
- Jeffrey Salen - Guitar
- Hilly Boy Michaels - Drums

Technical

- Rupert Holmes - Production
- Jeffrey Lesser (for Widescreen Productions) - Production
- Godfrey Diamond - Engineering, Re-mix
- Bob Clearmountain - Additional engineering
- Harvey Goldberg - Additional engineering
- Michael Barbiero - Additional engineering
- Richard Avedon - photography

== Charts ==
Big Beat chart performance
Chart (1976)	Peak position
Swedish Albums (Sverigetopplistan)	24
