= Propaganda (Sparks album) =

Studio album by Sparks
- Released: November 11, 1974
- Recorded: 1974
- Genres: Glam rock; baroque pop; art rock
- Length: 33:41
- Label: Island
- Producer: Muff Winwood

Sparks chronology
| Kimono My House (1974) | Propaganda (1974) | Indiscreet (1975) |

Singles from Propaganda
- 1. "Never Turn Your Back on Mother Earth" Released: October 1974; 2. "At Home, at Work, at Play" Released: 1974 (France); 3. "Something for the Girl with Everything" Released: January 1975; 4. "Achoo" Released: March 1975 (US)

Professional ratings
Review scores
| Source | Rating |
|---|---|
| AllMusic | 4/5 stars |
| Christgau's Record Guide | C− |
| Classic Rock | 8/10 stars |
| Tom Hull | A− |

Propaganda is the fourth studio album by American rock band Sparks, released on November 11, 1974 by Island Records. Following up their commercial breakthrough, Kimono My House, released earlier the same year, it was a moderate success in the United States and peaked at No. 9 in the UK in 1975. The album cover features an image of a tied-up and gagged Mael brothers, titled "Welcome on Board", which was taken by photographer Monty Coles.

== Release ==
The album followed its predecessor Kimono My House by half a year and was a successful album in the UK and US. It peaked at No. 9 on the UK Album Chart, which would remain their second highest album chart position in the UK for nearly 43 years until pushed down into third place by Hippopotamus in 2017, and No. 63 on the Billboard 200, which remains their highest peak in that country).

The singles "Never Turn Your Back on Mother Earth" and "Something for the Girl with Everything", while not as successful as those from Kimono My House, both reached the Top 20 in the UK peaking at No. 13 and No. 17 respectively. In France, "At Home, at Work, at Play" together with "Propaganda" was released as a single instead of "Something for the Girl with Everything". In the US, "Achoo" was released as the album's only single.

"Bon Voyage" and "Thanks But No Thanks" appear briefly in the 2021 musical drama film Annette, which Ron and Russell co-wrote with the director Leos Carax.

== Critical reception ==
Reviewing in Christgau's Record Guide: Rock Albums of the Seventies (1981), Robert Christgau wrote: "Admirers of these self-made twerps certainly don't refer to them as pop because they get on the AM—for once the programmers are doing their job. So is it because they sing in a high register? Or because a good beat makes them even more uncomfortable than other accoutrements of a well-lived life?; 'Never turn your back on mother earth,' they chant or gibber in a style unnatural enough to end your current relationship or kill your cacti, and I must be a natural man after all, because I can't endure the contradiction."

Dave Connolly of AllMusic touched on the criticism: "The torrential outpouring of words and ideas, underscored by guitars and keyboards with oft-shifting rhythms, either repels or attracts listeners." However, he believed "close-minded" American listeners were more critical of the album's "cross between 10cc and the power pop of the late '70s", concluding that "Propaganda remains one of Sparks' brightest achievements, brimming with a loopy charm that continued to captivate the open-minded English listeners".

== Re-release ==
Propaganda was re-issued and remastered by Island in 1994 and 2006. The first issue by the Island Masters subsidiary added the B-sides "Alabamy Right" and "Marry Me". The 21st Century Edition also included an interview from Saturday Scene recorded in November 1974.

== Track listing ==
All tracks are written by Ron Mael, except where indicated.

Side one
| No. | Title | Writer(s) | Length |
|---|---|---|---|
| 1. | "Propaganda" | | 0:23 |
| 2. | "At Home, at Work, at Play" | | 3:06 |
| 3. | "Reinforcements" | Ron and Russell Mael | 3:55 |
| 4. | "B.C." | | 2:13 |
| 5. | "Thanks But No Thanks" | Ron and Russell Mael | 4:14 |
| 6. | "Don't Leave Me Alone with Her" | | 3:02 |

Side two
| No. | Title | Writer(s) | Length |
|---|---|---|---|
| 1. | "Never Turn Your Back on Mother Earth" | | 2:28 |
| 2. | "Something for the Girl with Everything" | | 2:17 |
| 3. | "Achoo" | | 3:34 |
| 4. | "Who Don't Like Kids" | | 3:37 |
| 5. | "Bon Voyage" | Ron and Russell Mael | 4:52 |
| Total length: | | | 33:41 |

Island Masters bonus tracks (1994)
| No. | Title | Length |
|---|---|---|
| 12. | "Alabamy Right" | 2:11 |
| 13. | "Marry Me" | 2:54 |
| Total length: | | 38:46 |

21st Century Edition bonus tracks (2006)
| No. | Title | Length |
|---|---|---|
| 12. | "Alabamy Right" | 2:11 |
| 13. | "Marry Me" | 2:54 |
| 14. | "Interview – Saturday Scene 8/11/74" | 7:16 |
| Total length: | | 46:02 |

== Personnel ==
=== Sparks ===
- Russell Mael – vocals
- Ron Mael – keyboards
- Trevor White – guitar
- Ian Hampton – bass
- Norman "Dinky" Diamond – drums
- Adrian Fisher – guitar

=== Production and artwork ===
- Produced by Muff Winwood
- Recording engineers – Richard Digby-Smith, Robin Black, and Bill Price
- Remix engineer – Bill Price
- Concept and photography – Monty Coles

== Charts ==
=== Album ===
| Chart (1974–75) | Peak position |
|---|---|
| Australian Albums (Kent Music Report) | 75 |
| Canada Top Albums/CDs (RPM) | 81 |
| German Albums (Offizielle Top 100) | 49 |
| Norwegian Albums (VG-lista) | 16 |
| Swedish Albums (Sverigetopplistan) | 50 |
| UK Albums (Official Charts) | 9 |
| US Billboard 200 | 63 |

=== Singles ===
"Never Turn Your Back on Mother Earth"
| Chart (1974-75) | Peak position |
|---|---|
| Belgium (Ultratop 50 Wallonia) | 48 |
| Netherlands (Dutch Top 40) (Note: "Looks, Looks, Looks" peaked at no. 11 on the Dutch Top 40 Tipparade, which measures songs that fall below the threshold of a top 40 hit.) | 51 |
| UK Singles (OCC) | 13 |
| West Germany (GfK) | 40 |

"Something for the Girl with Everything"
| Chart (1975) | Peak position |
|---|---|
| Netherlands (Dutch Top 40) | 30 |
| UK Singles (OCC) | 17 |

== Certifications ==
| Region | Certification | Certified units/sales |
|---|---|---|
| United Kingdom (BPI) | Silver | 60,000^{^} |
^{^} Shipments figures based on certification alone.
