= Sparks (band) =

American musical duo

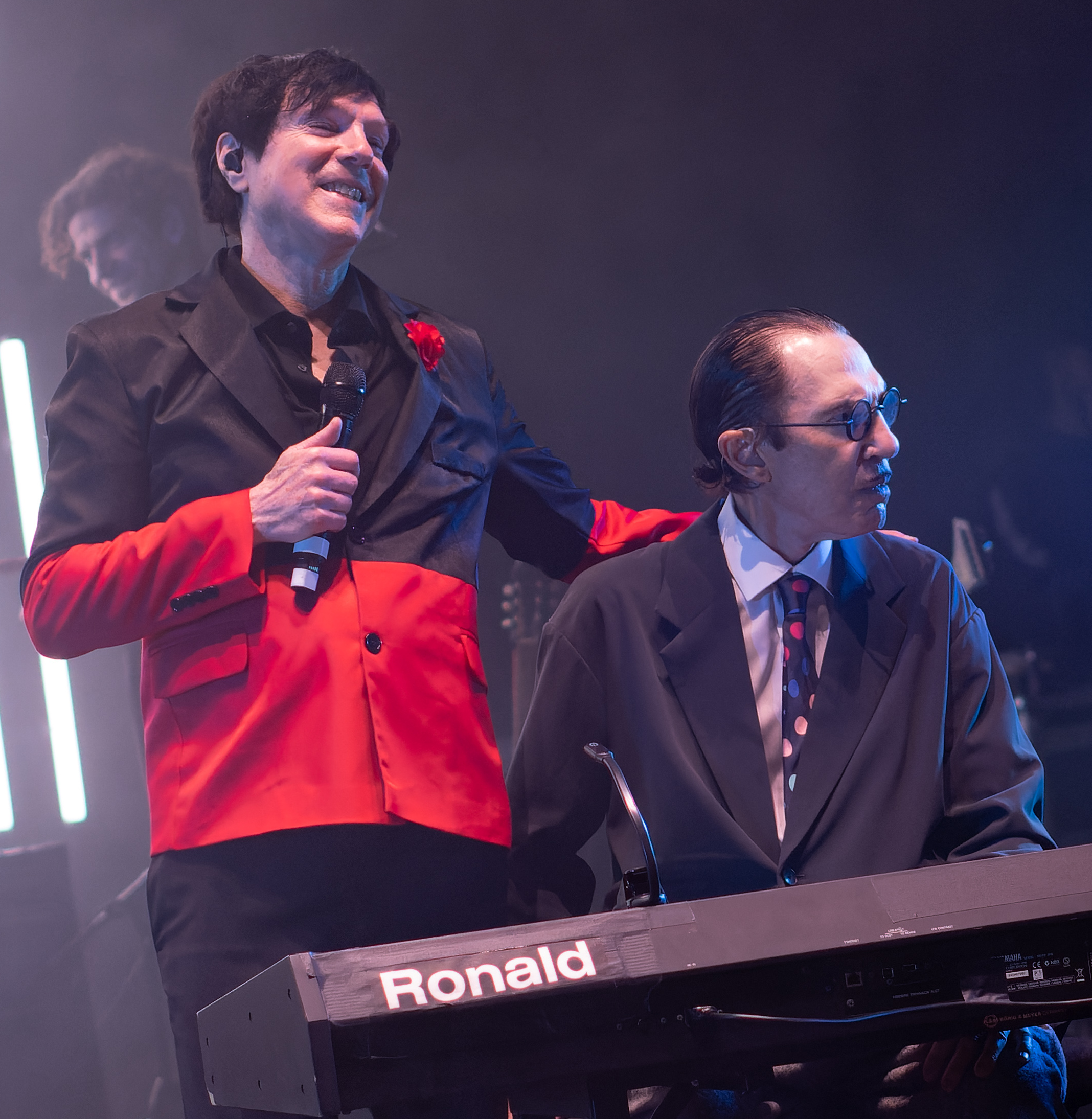
- Sparks during a performance at the Royal Albert Hall in London, England, May 29, 2023. From left to right: Russell Mael (vocals) and Ron Mael (keyboards)

Background information
- Also known as: Halfnelson
- Origin: Pacific Palisades, California, U.S.
- Genres: Art pop; art rock; glam rock; electronic; synth-pop; new wave
- Works: Discography
- Years active: 1968–present
- Labels: Lil' Beethoven; Island; Atlantic; Bearsville; Warner Bros.; Curb; Virgin; Underdog; Carrere; CBS; Elektra; RCA; Roadrunner; Domino; Transgressive
- Spinoffs: FFS
- Members: Ron Mael; Russell Mael
- Past members: Earle Mankey; James Mankey; Harley Feinstein; Martin Gordon; Adrian Fisher; Norman "Dinky" Diamond; Trevor White; Ian Hampton
- Website: allsparks.com

Sparks is an American pop and rock duo consisting of brothers Ron (keyboards) and Russell Mael (vocals). Formed as the band Halfnelson in 1968 in the Pacific Palisades, Los Angeles, Sparks are noted for their quirky approach to songwriting; their music is often accompanied by sophisticated and acerbic lyrics—sometimes containing literary or cinematic references—and an idiosyncratic, theatrical stage presence, typified by the contrast between Russell's animated, hyperactive front-man antics and Ron's deadpan scowling. Russell Mael has a distinctive wide-ranging voice, while Ron Mael plays keyboards in an intricate and rhythmic style. Their frequently changing styles and visual presentations have kept the band at the forefront of modern, artful pop music.

Career highlights include the glam rock song "This Town Ain't Big Enough for Both of Us", which reached No. 2 on the UK singles chart in 1974; the disco hits "The Number One Song in Heaven" and "Beat the Clock" in 1979, resulting from a collaboration with Giorgio Moroder and marking a stylistic shift towards new wave and synth-pop; "When I'm with You", which made the Australian and French Singles Charts in 1980; the single "I Predict", which provided Sparks' first appearance on the Billboard Hot 100, reaching No. 60 in May 1982; the 1983 single "Cool Places" with the Go-Go's rhythm guitarist and backing vocalist Jane Wiedlin, and the Eurodisco song "When Do I Get to Sing 'My Way'", which was the top airplay record in Germany for 1994.

The release of their nineteenth studio album Lil' Beethoven (2002), the duo's self-proclaimed "genre-defining opus", fused repetitive song structures with orchestral arrangements, and brought them renewed critical success. In 2015, the band released their sole album with Scottish indie rock band Franz Ferdinand, as the supergroup FFS, titled FFS. In 2017, returning to a rock-group format, Sparks released Hippopotamus, which entered the UK Albums Chart at No. 7, as did their next album, A Steady Drip, Drip, Drip, released in 2020, bringing their tally of UK Top 10 albums to four. In 2021, Sparks were involved in two films: the Leos Carax musical film Annette for which they wrote all songs (winning the César Award for Best Original Music), and the Edgar Wright documentary The Sparks Brothers recounting the history of the band. The band's 25th studio album The Girl Is Crying in Her Latte was released on May 26, 2023, via Island Records, and again entered the UK Albums Chart at No. 7. Mad! was released in May 2025 and entered the UK album chart at no. 2, the duo's highest ever chart position.

== History ==
=== Inception ===
Brothers Ron and Russell Mael grew up in Pacific Palisades, a neighborhood in the Westside region of the city of Los Angeles, during the "Golden Age" of the L.A. club scene, when the Doors, the Standells, and Love played the Whisky a Go Go on Sunset Strip and the Beach Boys played in the late afternoon at Teen-Age Fair at Pickwick Recreation Center in Burbank, California.

Both Ron and Russell Mael are seen in the audience during the Ronettes' section of the concert film The Big T.N.T. Show, filmed in 1965. Both attended University of California, Los Angeles (UCLA), Ron studied cinema and graphic art, and Russell studied theatre arts and filmmaking. Detesting the folk music scene, which they considered "cerebral and sedate and we had no time for that", they developed a particular taste in English bands of the time such as the Who, Pink Floyd, the Kinks and the Move, which led to their description of themselves as "Anglophiles".

Ron and Russell's very first recordings were made with the Urban Renewal Project on January 14, 1967, at the Fidelity Recording Studios in Hollywood, Los Angeles. Four tracks were recorded with Fred and Ronna Frank, 16-year old drummer Raymond Clayton, and 22-year old Harold Zellman on bass guitar. Ron was considered the lead guitarist and Russell was the lead vocalist, also playing the tambourine and harmonica. The other three tracks are: "The Windmill", "A Quick Thought" and "As You Like It". Russell plays pan flute on "A Quick Thought". The songs were pressed on two acetates and have never been released, apart from the track "Computer Girl", which was featured on a CD included with the Japanese semi-biography from 2006 and more widely released on the Past Tense greatest hits album in 2019.

Forming Halfnelson, named after a wrestling hold, in 1968, they soon came to the attention of record producer Todd Rundgren, at whose urging Albert Grossman signed the band to his Bearsville record label. Their self-titled debut album was released on Bearsville Records in early 1972 with the line-up consisting of college friend Earle Mankey on guitar, Mankey's brother James on bass guitar, Harley Feinstein on drums and Rundgren producing. It sold poorly. The Whole Burbank Catalog, a 1972 Warner Brothers $2, 2-LP loss leader sampler, included "Biology II". After renaming themselves Sparks in 1972, a play on the Marx Brothers, the album was re-released by Bearsville Records later that year as Sparks, which spawned the minor regional hit "Wonder Girl".

Their follow-up album, A Woofer in Tweeter's Clothing, led to a tour of the United Kingdom, including a residency at the Marquee Club in London, England. These London appearances helped them to secure a significant cult following.

=== 1973–1976: the Island Records years ===
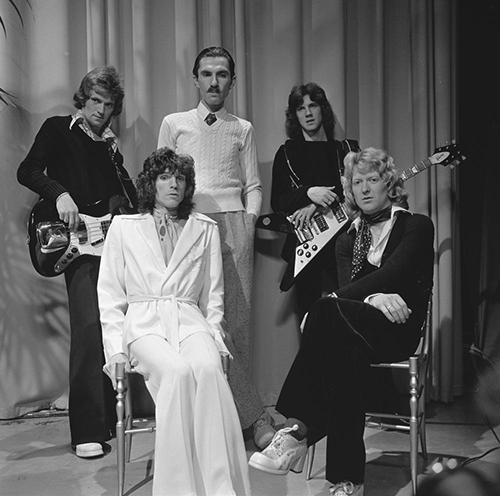
Sparks, on TopPop in the Netherlands, May 17, 1974. From left to right: Ian Hampton (bass), Russell Mael (vocals), Ron Mael (keyboards), Adrian Fisher (guitar), Norman "Dinky" Diamond (drums)

Relocating to England in 1973 with a new manager, John Hewlett, founder of John's Children, and a recording contract from Island Records, thanks in part to the exposure garnered by their BBC2 Whistle Test performance, they placed an ad in music weekly Melody Maker ("Wanted bass player for Sparks. Must be beard free and exciting") and through this hired Martin Gordon. With Adrian Fisher on guitar and Norman "Dinky" Diamond on drums, in the midst of power cuts and a threatened vinyl shortage, they recorded their breakthrough album Kimono My House in 1974, scoring a UK No. 2 hit with the single "This Town Ain't Big Enough for Both of Us".

Sparks became a UK teen sensation appearing on the cover of Melody Maker, Record Mirror and countless other pop magazines in the UK and Europe. Hits such as "This Town Ain't Big Enough for Both of Us", "Amateur Hour" and "Never Turn Your Back on Mother Earth" led to many appearances on the BBC's flagship record chart television programme Top of the Pops. Russell's hyperactive movements were in sharp contrast to the keyboard-bound, soberly dressed Ron's expressionless squint and Charlie Chaplin-esque toothbrush moustache.

Gordon and Fisher were later replaced by Trevor White and Ian Hampton. In 1975, the revised band returned to the US to tour supporting Kimono My House and Propaganda which had gained strong cult attention in New York City, Cleveland, Chicago, San Francisco and Los Angeles primarily from FM radio play and a national TV appearance on Don Kirshner's Rock Concert. Comedy rock duo Flo & Eddie were the opening act. Influential 1970s progressive FM radio station powerhouse WMMS in Cleveland and its famed DJs such as Kid Leo initially championed the band in America. Sparks also performed on American Bandstand in 1975 with host Dick Clark mugging with Ron and on countless other TV shows in the US and abroad post-1977.

The follow-up albums, Propaganda (1974) and Indiscreet (1975), the latter produced by Tony Visconti, were similarly successful and produced the hit singles "Looks, Looks, Looks", "Never Turn Your Back on Mother Earth" and "Something for the Girl with Everything".

=== 1976–1980: Return to the United States and transition to synth-pop ===
The Maels returned home to Los Angeles in 1976. Concerned that their music might have become stale, they adopted a more "American" sound and recorded Big Beat with Rupert Holmes and Jeffrey Lesser on production, which they followed with Introducing Sparks (1977). Both albums were mostly recorded with session musicians. This new "West Coast sound" yielded such songs as "Nothing to Do", "Everybody's Stupid", and "Throw Her Away (And Get a New One)". In 1977, Sparks made one of their first forays into the film business, making a cameo appearance in the disaster-suspense film Rollercoaster, after Kiss had turned down the roles. They performed the songs "Fill-er-up" and "Big Boy".

By 1977 the brothers found themselves at a crossroads. They had cut ties with Hewlett and had grown tired of recording within a traditional rock band framework. In a conversation with a German journalist, they expressed their admiration for Giorgio Moroder, a pioneer of electronic disco and pop music. Moroder happened to be a friend of the journalist, and she was able to connect the brothers with the Italian record producer, who produced their next album, Nº 1 in Heaven. More electronic and synthesizer-based than their previous efforts, the album would redefine Sparks' sound and challenge the concept of what is meant by a band, and it also became a major influence on emerging electronic pop artists. It spawned two singles in the top-fifteen UK chart: "The Number One Song in Heaven" and "Beat the Clock". Their follow-up album, Terminal Jive (1980), had a number-one single in France, "When I'm with You", which led to the Maels staying in the country for a year promoting the album, during which time Russell became conversationally fluent in French. The single also hit the Top 20 in Australia, reaching No. 14. In 1981, Belgian synth-pop group Telex enlisted Sparks to help write the lyrics for their third studio album, Sex.

=== 1981–1990: the Los Angeles years ===
Finding the electronic equipment that they had adopted for their new sound too cumbersome for touring, the band returned to the more conventional band format for their next three releases, although they did not eschew synthesizers entirely: Whomp That Sucker (1981), Angst in My Pants (1982; two tracks from which appear later in the 1983 film Valley Girl), and In Outer Space (1983). They broke into the US singles chart once more, reaching No. 49 with "Cool Places" from In Outer Space. The track was a collaboration with the Go-Go's rhythm guitarist and backing vocalist Jane Wiedlin (a dedicated fan of the band who at one time ran her own Sparks fan club), and its success was in part thanks to Los Angeles' KROQ-FM radio station, which hailed them as local heroes.

In 1983, they did the theme song for the musical comedy film Get Crazy, starring Malcolm McDowell and Daniel Stern.

In 1984, the Maels wrote and performed several original songs on the soundtrack for the black comedy teen film Bad Manners (also known as Growing Pains), including the film's title song, "Bad Manners". Around the same time, they released Pulling Rabbits Out of a Hat. It was not very well received and failed to capitalise on the commercial success of their previous album In Outer Space (1983). The album developed the light synth-pop sound of In Outer Space but with slightly darker lyrics revolving around Ron Mael's favourite subject matter: relationships.

In 1986, they released Music That You Can Dance To, which was the band's most dance music inspired album since Nº 1 in Heaven (1979). The overall sound of the album was dominated by synthesizers and sequencers like Nº 1 in Heaven but it differed from that release by the inclusion of the heavily distorted bass guitar of Leslie Bohem, and the emphasis on discordant sound effects.

In 1988, they released Interior Design, which did little in the way of reversing the commercial fortunes of the duo, and did not appear on the album charts in the US or the UK. The singles "So Important" and "Just Got Back from Heaven" did better, both of which reached the top ten of the Billboard Hot Dance Music/Club Play chart at no. 8 and no. 7 respectively. "Just Got Back from Heaven" also appeared on the Hot Dance Music/Maxi-Singles Sales chart at no. 24.

In 1989, they scored a hit single in France and in Europe with "Singing in the Shower", sung in duet with French pop rock group Les Rita Mitsouko: the single was produced by Tony Visconti.

Beginning in the late 1980s, Sparks attempted to make the Japanese manga series Mai, the Psychic Girl into a musical, with interest from filmmaker and producer Tim Burton and Carolco Pictures, who purchased the film rights in August 1991. Carolco hoped Burton would start production in 1992, but he chose to work on The Nightmare Before Christmas (1993) and Ed Wood (1994) for Touchstone Pictures. The option on the film rights eventually expired, and Burton dropped out. Francis Ford Coppola later developed the property in the late 1990s. In June 2000, Sony Pictures started on a different project with Hong Kong film director Kirk Wong attached to direct. By February 2001, a script had been written by Lisa Addario and Joey Syracuse for Sony's Columbia Pictures. The release of The Seduction of Ingmar Bergman, a radio musical by Sparks, in August 2009, was informed by the six years the band spent trying to get their Mai, the Psychic Girl produced. The album generated new interest, and gained a "second wind", lead vocalist Russell Mael explained. "The music is all ready and we are hoping that this still might see the light of day." On May 18, 2010, Burton expressed renewed interest in adapting the property.

=== 1990–2002: Embracing techno and success in Europe ===
In 1993, Ron and Russell returned with the non-album single "National Crime Awareness Week", their first release since Interior Design in 1988. The song was produced by the Scottish electronic music group Finitribe, and its techno-styled production served as a taster for the duo's new direction during this era. In 1994, the Maels released Gratuitous Sax & Senseless Violins, providing the hit singles "When Do I Get to Sing 'My Way'" and "When I Kiss You (I Hear Charlie Parker Playing)". In Germany, the former was the no. 1 airplay song for 1994 as well as being hailed critically for its poignant lyrics and touching melody. The band toured in support of the album with percussionist Christi Haydon playing drums. Haydon also appeared in the videos for both singles, which were directed by English music video director Sophie Muller.

1997 saw the release of Plagiarism, an album of cover versions of their own songs featuring collaborations with Faith No More, Erasure and Jimmy Somerville of Bronski Beat and the Communards. Half of the album was recorded by Tony Visconti in London with the other half recorded by the brothers in their own purpose-built studio in LA, surrounded by busts of Elvis Presley. In 1998 they recorded the soundtrack for the action film Knock Off, starring Jean-Claude Van Damme, directed by Hong Kong filmmaker Tsui Hark (who had appeared on his own tribute song by the band on the album Gratuitous Sax and Senseless Violins).

Balls, released in 2000, again put the band in a context of electronic instrumentation with some of Ron's most striking and perceptive lyrics. With the release of Balls the band toured the UK, Germany, Japan and Australia.

=== 2002–2009: Artistic and critical renaissance ===
After Balls, the band resurfaced in 2002 with the release of an album described as what they called their "genre-defining opus" – Lil' Beethoven, featuring quasi-classical arrangements of strings and choirs. Lil' Beethoven led to renewed interest in the band. Record Collector magazine named the album as one of its "Best New Albums of 2002", describing it as "... possibly the most exciting and interesting release ever from such a long-established act" and later in 2003 saying "... it really does feel like one of the best albums ever recorded." A UK and European tour had the band playing the entire album each night in the first half of the show, with fan favourites making up the second. The line-up now included former Faith No More guitarist Dean Menta in addition to Tammy Glover on drums. Long-time fan Morrissey invited Sparks to perform at the 2004 Meltdown Festival, of which he was curator. They performed their breakthrough album Kimono My House, followed by Lil Beethoven, both in their entirety. Also in this period, the duo appeared in the music video for the Darkness' Justin Hawkins's cover version of "This Town Ain't Big Enough for Both of Us", in which Ron and Russell play the referee and MC at a darts match between Hawkins and darts champion Phil Taylor. This version of "This Town" reached No. 6 in the UK charts. Sparks would later release Lil' Beethoven's closing track "Suburban Homeboy" as a single.

February 2006 saw the release of Hello Young Lovers, their twentieth studio album. The album is regarded as carrying on where Lil' Beethoven left off, being described as "... cynical, intelligent and very, very funny", it has met with considerable acclaim. Sparks led off the album with the striking tune that the BBC deemed its title, "Dick Around", too provocative to play. The song is a multi-section, multi-mood, highly layered track that many felt should have been a UK smash hit had the BBC not misinterpreted the title of the song as being other than it was.

The brothers were dismissive of the latest trends in popular music at this time, seeing most contemporary bands as lacking musical ambition and experimental drive. Indeed, the predictable trends in much of modern rock served as inspiration for Hello Young Lovers. However, they have expressed admiration for Eminem and Morrissey.

The pair appeared in the season 6 finale of the American comedy drama television series Gilmore Girls, performing "Perfume" from the album Hello Young Lovers. They released a live DVD of a September 2006 show at O_{2} Forum Kentish Town as well as a long-awaited CD release of their previously unavailable album Introducing Sparks from 1977. "Perfume" was also featured in a Dolce & Gabbana TV commercial in 2009.

On May 12, 2008, Sparks released the single "Good Morning", taken from their 21st studio album Exotic Creatures of the Deep.

May and June 2008 saw the 21-night "Sparks Spectacular" in London, where they played each of their studio albums in chronological order during the first twenty nights and premiered their new album on the twenty-first concert on June 13, 2008. Each night, they performed an album in its entirety followed by a rare track—many of the songs had never been performed live before. The band asked their fans to visit their website and vote for the track that they'd most like to hear the band perform during the second half of the 21st concert after the premiere of Exotic Creatures of the Deep, though Russell admitted that he and Ron would probably influence the poll a little.

Fans who bought a "Golden Ticket" (which allowed entry into all 21 gigs) also received a poster signed by the band and a CD single, "Islington N1". The title is a reference to the postal address of the venue for the first 20 gigs. "Islington N1" was later made available in the box set edition of the career-spanning New Music for Amnesiacs.

In 2009, the band played two consecutive nights at O_{2} Forum Kentish Town in London on March 20 and 21. They played Exotic Creatures of the Deep in its entirety at both gigs, followed by Kimono My House in its entirety on the first night and Nº 1 in Heaven in its entirety on the second night.

On February 14, 2009, Sparks performed the same show before a sold-out hometown crowd at Royce Hall in Los Angeles at UCLA, the alma mater of the Mael Brothers.

Ron and Russell appeared as interview subjects in the 2009 documentary The Magnificent Tati, discussing their involvement during the early 1980s in Confusion, a proposed film by French filmmaker Jacques Tati for which a screenplay was written but never shot (due to Tati's death in 1982).

=== 2009: The Seduction of Ingmar Bergman ===
The band premiered the radio musical The Seduction of Ingmar Bergman, in August 2009. Commissioned by Swedish public radio (SR), it featured the Mael brothers themselves along with Swedish actors Elin Klinga and Jonas Malmsjö, both of whom worked with Bergman in his lifetime. The musical, partly in English, partly in Swedish, tells the story of Bergman's relocation to Hollywood after his breakthrough with Smiles of a Summer Night (1955), and the surreal and discomforting encounter with the film capital. The UK's BBC Radio 6 Music held a similar event in London two months later whereby the musical was played in its entirety before a live audience at the BBC Broadcasting House in London and later to be broadcast with a Q&A with the Maels.

In June 2011, as part of the Los Angeles Film Festival, Sparks presented the World Premiere live performance of The Seduction of Ingmar Bergman at the John Anson Ford Amphitheatre in Hollywood. Canadian film director Guy Maddin provided directions based on the screenplay, with Ron and Russell reprising their recorded roles on stage. The role of Ingmar Bergman was performed by Finnish movie actor Peter Franzén, and American actress Ann Magnuson portrayed Greta Garbo. The group showcased at the film festival in an attempt to raise funding for a feature film version.

Since 2011, the band have been pursuing the idea of turning The Seduction of Ingmar Bergman into a feature film. Originally envisaged as a live-action film, in 2017, the Mael Brothers announced they were taking a new direction and developing Bergman as an animated feature film with director Joseph Wallace, who created the music video for their track "Edith Piaf (Said It Better Than Me)". As of 2025 no film version of the musical has been made.

=== 2010–2019: Two Hands, One Mouth, FFS, and Hippopotamus ===
In 2010, Sparks remixed Yoko Ono's 1980 song "Give Me Something". In July they contributed a remix of sorts to singer Katie Melua's single, "A Happy Place", calling it Sparks VS. Melua. September 2 marked the debut of the new theme songs that Ron and Russell had composed and recorded for NPR radio's Bookworm show, broadcast in Los Angeles on station KCRW. The two songs, titled "Where Would We Be Without Books?" and "I Am a Bookworm", were commissioned by show host and Sparks fan Michael Silverblatt as the first new theme songs for the programme in 21 years.

In 2012, Ron and Russell collaborated with British singer Gemma Ray who released a limited twelve-inch single, "Gemma Ray Sings Sparks (with Sparks)", which included Ray's cover versions of Sparks "How Do I Get to Carnegie Hall" and "Eaten by the Monster of Love". In October, Ron and Russell performed live for the first time ever as a duo, with no backing band. The 18-city European tour, Two Hands One Mouth, began in Lithuania and followed in Latvia, Finland, Norway, Sweden, Germany, Belgium, Ireland and finished with a sold-out show at the Barbican Centre in London. The tour then took the group to Japan and the US, including two performances at the Coachella festival, with a show in Paris following in 2013 where they were joined on stage by Catherine Ringer from Les Rita Mitsouko to sing on their 1989 collaboration "Singing in the Shower". Recordings from the tour resulted in Sparks first live album, Two Hands, One Mouth: Live in Europe, which was released later in 2013. Ron and Russell continued touring in the duo format for a second round, titling the tour "The Revenge of Two Hands One Mouth", taking in dates in both North America and Europe, including Fun Fun Fun Fest in Austin, Texas, and three nights at Union Chapel in London, where Thurston Moore of Sonic Youth joined them to play guitar on "This Town Ain't Big Enough for Both of Us". Both "Two Hands One Mouth" and "The Revenge of Two Hands One Mouth" tours were critically well received. In 2015, they contributed a song and brief voice part to the Guy Maddin experimental fantasy drama film The Forbidden Room.

For the 40th anniversary of Kimono My House, the album was performed in its entirety, along with a greatest hits set, at the Barbican Centre in London on the 19th and 20th of December 2014, featuring backing performances from the 35-piece Heritage Orchestra. Ron and Russell took the Kimono My House celebrations to Los Angeles as they performed the album on two consecutive nights with a 38-piece orchestra at the United Artists Theatre at Ace Hotel Downtown Los Angeles on the 14th and 15th of February 2015. Both shows sold out and received glowing reviews. Alex Kapranos of Franz Ferdinand joined them onstage both nights for a duet with Russell on the song "When Do I Get to Sing 'My Way'".

Before Kapranos's appearance in Los Angeles, Sparks and Franz Ferdinand had been collaborating and in late 2014 had recorded an album together, produced by John Congleton. The supergroup, named FFS, was unveiled in March 2015 with a short teaser video of song "The Power Couple". An eponymous studio album was released in June 2015. The album was promoted with appearances on the contemporary British music television show Later with Jools Holland and the Glastonbury Festival.

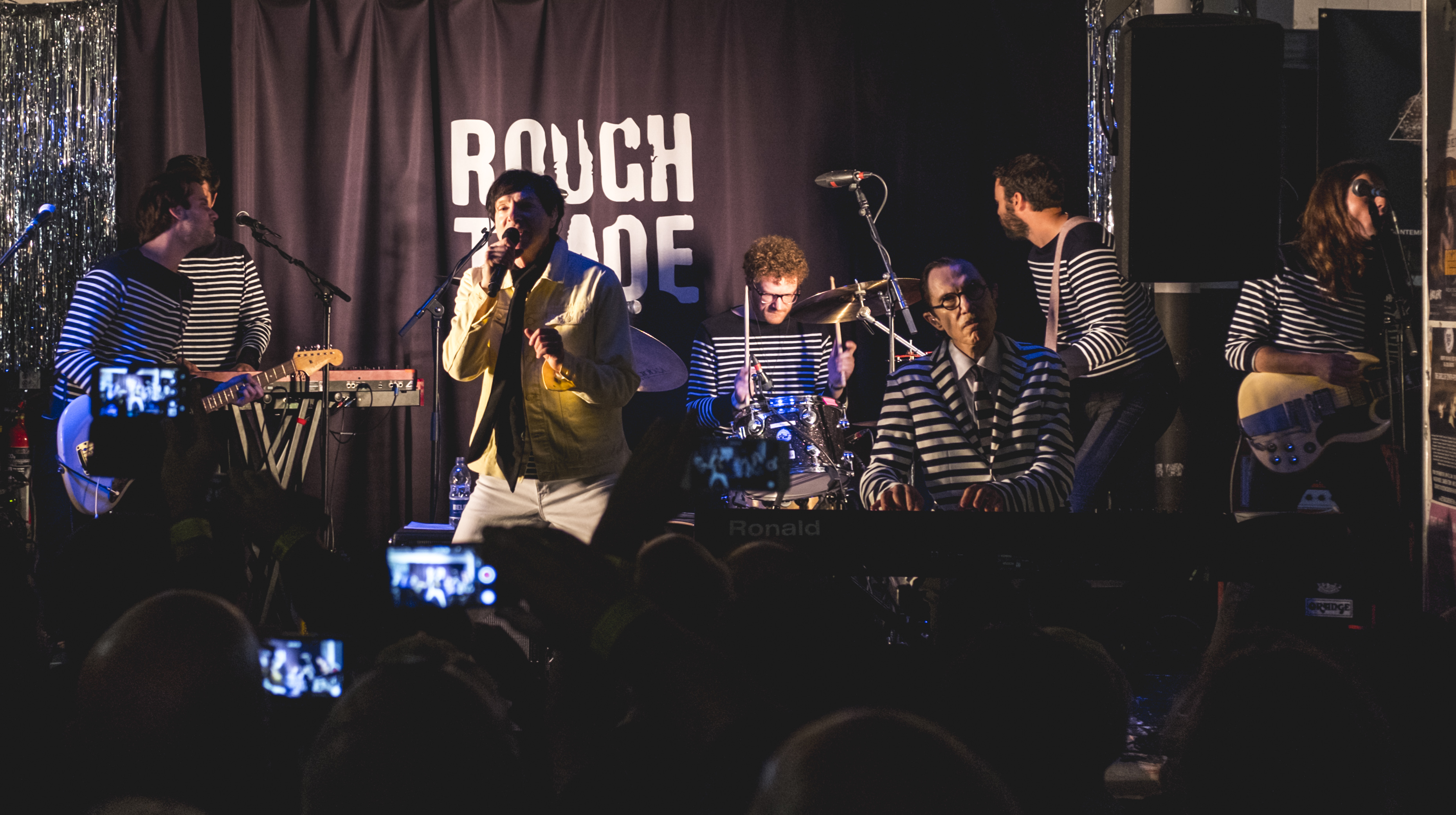
Sparks performing at Rough Trade East, Brick Lane in London, 2017

Sparks's 23rd studio album , Hippopotamus, was released in September 2017 to critical and commercial success, peaking at number 7 on the UK Albums Chart. A full band tour, starting in Copenhagen, Denmark, was undertaken to support the record. In 2019, Sparks collaborated with and were featured on French artist Sebastian's song "Handcuffed to a Parking Meter" which is on his second studio album Thirst.

=== 2020–2022: A Steady Drip, Drip, Drip, The Sparks Brothers, and Annette ===
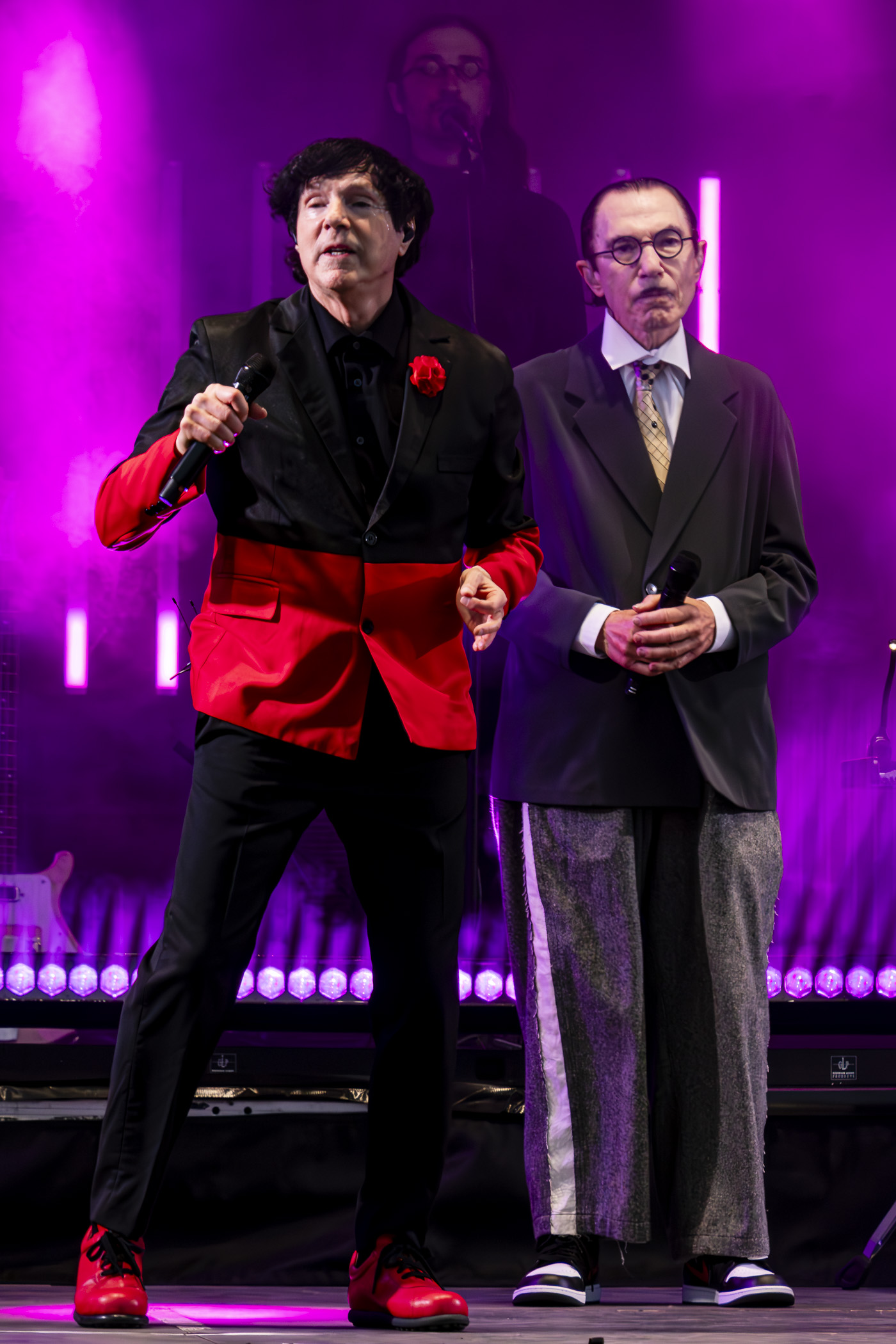
Sparks performing at the Glastonbury Festival in Pilton, Somerset, 2023

The band's first album of the 2020s, A Steady Drip, Drip, Drip, was released in digital form in May 2020, with the physical release pushed back to July due to the COVID-19 pandemic. The album was preceded by singles "Self-Effacing", and "I'm Toast" in February and March, respectively. Like its predecessor Hippopotamus, it entered the UK Albums Chart at number 7 and garnered universal critical acclaim. Coinciding with the physical release of the album, an official music video for the song "The Existential Threat" premiered on YouTube, the animation created by English freelance animator and artist Cyriak. The band then collaborated with Todd Rundgren on the single "Your Fandango", 50 years after he produced their debut album.

Sparks were involved in two 2021 film releases, as screenwriters and composers for the musical romantic drama Annette, directed by French film director Leos Carax and starring Adam Driver and Marion Cotillard; and in The Sparks Brothers, a documentary about their career directed by English filmmaker Edgar Wright. Annette premiered at the 2021 Cannes Film Festival and was in competition for the Palme d'Or. The leading track "So May We Start" was accompanied by a video featuring the band with Driver and Cotillard, and the Annette soundtrack was released on Sony.

In February 2022 Sparks played two sold-out shows at the Walt Disney Concert Hall, their first full concerts since 2018 following postponements of tour dates throughout 2020 and 2021. Variety lauded the first concert as "a rousingly celebratory homecoming". North American and European spring tours followed, then festival dates in the US and at Summer Sonic Festival in Japan. The Maels performed at the 2022 César Awards (France's national film award ceremony), and they received a César for best original music for Annette. In November 2022, Focus Features announced they would be producing another new musical, X-Crucior, to be written and produced by the Mael brothers.

=== 2023–present: The Girl Is Crying in Her Latte, Mad!, and Madder! ===
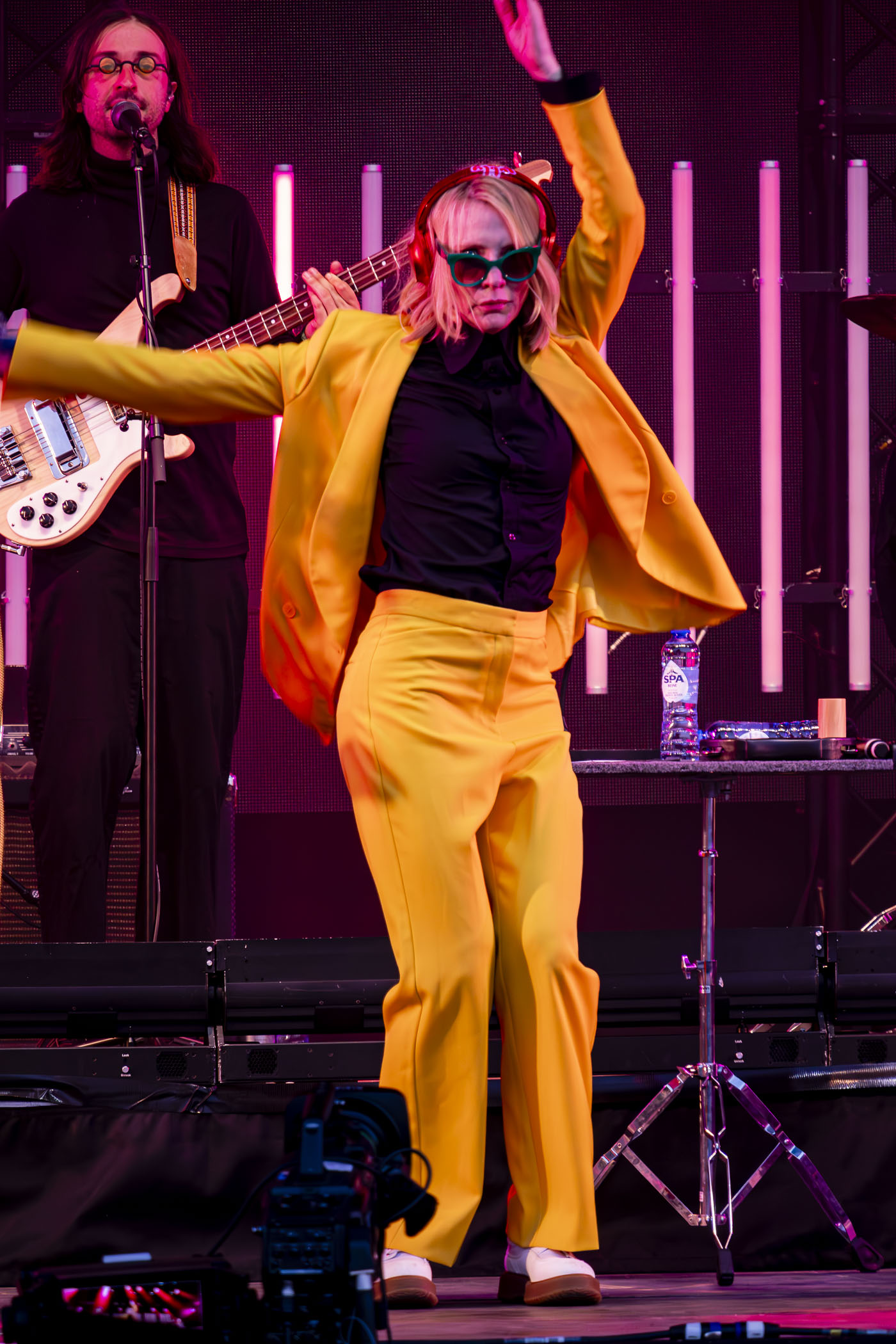
Cate Blanchett performing with Sparks at the Glastonbury Festival in Pilton, Somerset, 2023

Their next studio album, The Girl Is Crying in Her Latte, and a world tour were confirmed for 2023. Sparks re-signed to Island Records in January 2023.The album's lead single, "The Girl Is Crying in Her Latte", features a music video released on March 3 with Australian actor Cate Blanchett dancing to the song. It was the best selling physical album in the UK on the week of release, and the tour supporting it included some remarkable firsts for the band: Two shows at the Royal Albert Hall, the Glastonbury Festival (featuring Cate Blanchett), the Hollywood Bowl with They Might Be Giants, and the Sydney Opera House.

Social media posts in September 2024 had the brothers posing with Hong Kong film director John Woo, teasing a collaboration, with the hashtag #xcrucior. Woo's Instagram account also posted the photo with hints at a "new project" and commented "maybe not action" (the genre he is most famous for working in). Woo has wanted to direct a musical for a long time, and shares a love of French cinema with the Maels (particularly 1964's The Umbrellas of Cherbourg). On September 9, he confirmed working on a "half-musical" with Sparks. The film, titled X-Crucior, has since remained in development. In August 2026, it was reported in The Telegraph that Woo had since left as the film's director, now to directed by someone whose name has yet to be disclosed.

On October 17, 2024, Sparks received the honor of Outstanding Contribution to Music at the 2024 AIM Independent Music Awards, where they announced that they had signed to Transgressive Records for the release of their 26th studio album, Mad! Upon its release the following May, even though they were no longer signed to a major label, the album furthered their commercial success in the UK, entering the UK Albums Chart at a career-high of no. 2.

As a first in their career, Sparks released their debut extended play, Madder!, on October 3, 2025. Described as the companion release to Mad!, the Mael brothers briefly returned to the studio after the album was released in May to record new material. Alongside the lead single and opener "Porcupine", the announcement for the EP arrived just one month prior to its release. The music video for "Porcupine", which came days later, starred the musician Self Esteem. Also in September, Sparks were featured on "The Happy Dictator", the lead single from the band Gorillaz's album The Mountain. They guested in a "surprise" show premiering the album in full to end Gorillaz' anniversary residency at the Copper Box Arena, and were announced as supporting act (along with Trueno) for the band's Tottenham Hotspur Stadium show in June 2026.

Sparks released their second live album, and first with a full band, entitled Sparks Live on the Moon, on August 14, 2026, through Transgressive Records. They previewed the record with a video of their performance of "Whippings and Apologies", originally from A Woofer in Tweeter's Clothing. The twenty-track album documents a concert that the Mael brothers claim to have accepted following their tour in 2025. Thematically, it takes place at the Taruntius crater on the Moon, and Cate Blanchett provided her voice to begin and end the show as the emcee.

== Style ==
Sparks is regarded as an art pop band. Their musical style has varied dramatically with Russell Mael's distinctive wide-ranging voice (in particular his far-reaching falsetto) and Ron Mael's intricate and rhythmic keyboard playing style is the common thread throughout their fifty-year career. In its review of Kimono My House, NME described Russell's falsetto as a "stratospheric blend of Marc Bolan and Tiny Tim". In the beginning, they attempted to emulate the sound of their English idols, such as the Who, Syd Barrett-era Pink Floyd and the Kinks, sometimes even pretending to be an English band while on the LA club circuit. They relocated to England during the glam rock era where, despite cutting an odd figure on this scene, they found success with their polished brand of intricate pop tunes and convoluted lyrics. Early albums such as Kimono My House combined glam rock with elements of bubblegum pop and baroque music. By the second half of the decade, they were concerned that the sound they had developed while based in England was in danger of becoming stale; they returned to LA, determined to adopt a more "West Coast" sound. This they achieved with producer Rupert Holmes on Big Beat and (sans Holmes) on Introducing Sparks.

The band were not satisfied with the results, which they felt lacked personality, perhaps because of the reliance on session musicians. This led to the most dramatic change of style the band would attempt, when they teamed up with Giorgio Moroder, dropped the rock-group format altogether and produced the disco record Nº 1 in Heaven which relied on synthesizers. This album is regarded as a landmark in the development of electronic music and greatly influenced bands which would emerge in the following years. They soon returned to a more traditional line-up, which remained until 1988's Interior Design. There then followed a long hiatus until 1994's Gratuitous Sax & Senseless Violins, which was a foray into the techno dance world, which they had helped to spawn back in the late 1970s.

In 2002, the band switched to a classically influenced art pop style with the release of their album Lil' Beethoven, replacing the beat-driven synth-pop of preceding albums with complex orchestral arrangements. The band acknowledged this change in style on the album's opening track "The Rhythm Thief".

Lyrically, the band's style has been described as coming from "the school of Cole Porter, favouring caustic wit over trivial personal problems, ... achingly clever lyrics seesaw between superficial gloss, profound sentiment and the incomprehensibly bizarre". Repeated lyrical motifs have become a distinct feature on recent albums. On "My Baby's Taking Me Home" of Lil' Beethoven (2002), the song title is repeated 104 times, with no other words used, other than a spoken interlude. Similarly, on the same album, "Your Call Is Very Important to Us", uses a corporation style call-hold message: "Your call is very important to us. Please hold" which is then sung with some additional words: "At first she said your call is very important to us, then she said please, please hold." The only other lyrics in the song are "Red light", "Green light", "I'm Getting Mixed Signals" and "Sorry, I'm Going to Have to Put You Back on Hold". These elements are layered with a simple piano line to create a highly textured effect.

The vocal sound on the single "This Town Ain't Big Enough for Both of Us" was criticised as "stylised". This may be because the song was written without any regard for the vocal style of Russell Mael. Ron Mael has explained:

"This Town Ain't Big Enough for Both of Us" was written in A, and by God, it'll be sung in A. I just feel that if you're coming up with most of the music, then you have an idea where it's going to go. And no singer is gonna get in my way.

Russell Mael has claimed in reply:

When he wrote "This Town Ain't Big Enough for Both of Us", Ron could only play it in that key. It was so much work to transpose the song and one of us had to budge, so I made the adjustment to fit in. My voice ain't a "rock" voice. It's not soulful, in the traditional rock way; It's not about "guts". It's untrained, unschooled, I never questioned why I was singing high. It just happened, dictated by the songs. Ron has always written Sparks' lyrics and never transposed them into a rock key for me to sing. He always packed each line with words and I had to sing them as they were.

== Legacy ==
Sparks has influenced a wide range of singers and bands, such as Björk, Duran Duran, Joy Division, Morrissey, and New Order. Steve Jones of the Sex Pistols said that he constantly listened to Kimono My House back in 1974 at Paul Cook's room. "We'd sit in his bedroom for hours listening to them". Joy Division cited "The Number One Song in Heaven" as a primary influence during the recording of "Love Will Tear Us Apart". Joy Division's drummer Stephen Morris stated: "When we were doing 'Love Will Tear Us Apart', there were two records we were into: Frank Sinatra's Greatest Hits and Sparks' "The Number One Song in Heaven". That was the beginning of getting interested in Giorgio Moroder". Bassist Peter Hook of New Order cited Moroder's production on "The Number One Song in Heaven" as a major influence when his band changed musical style to produce electro and dance-rock songs like "Temptation" in 1982. New Order also delivered an extended live version of "When I'm with You" that same year in Milan, Italy. (Note: In his autobiography, Peter Hook relates a New Order concert in Milan, Italy, in 1982 where they did a cover version of the 1979 Sparks' track, "When I'm with You". Hook also wrote that New Order's "Temptation" and "Hurt" were inspired in part by Giorgio Moroder's "production on the wonderful Sparks track 'Number One Song in Heaven'".) When they started playing music, lead vocalist Dave Gahan and principle songwriter Martin Gore of Depeche Mode cited them as one of their favorite bands. Gore also later covered "Never Turn Your Back on Mother Earth" on his first solo recording Counterfeit EP in 1989. Other early electronic acts like the Human League, and Erasure, also mentioned the duo. Nick Rhodes of Duran Duran stated about "This Town Ain't ...": "There was something about them that was very different. I was immediately fascinated with that song."

Sparks have also been name-checked by rock band the Smiths. Their lead vocalist Morrissey named Kimono My House as one of "his favourite LPs of all time". The Smiths' guitarist and co-songwriter Johnny Marr said: "There's nothing better than commerciality crossed with an interesting mind" and named "This Town Ain't Big Enough for Both of Us" as an instance, qualifying it as one of these "Trojan singles". Siouxsie and the Banshees recorded a version of the first Sparks' success as the opening song of their covers album Through the Looking Glass. Thurston Moore of Sonic Youth also included the Sparks' song "Equator" in his list of all-time favorite songs. Joey Ramone also mentioned his liking for their records, as did later the group They Might Be Giants. Devo's lead vocalist and keyboardist Mark Mothersbaugh described himself as a big "Ron Mael fan" and of his look: "it was so not rock n' roll, in an unexpected way, that you just couldn't help but think that there was something there". He also listened to Kimono My House during his formative years.

Björk talked about Kimono my House as one of the records that changed her life. "[Sparks] were exotic ... [they] were the most refreshing thing in my life" when she was eight. "I loved the way Russell Mael sung like a geisha, and that they were into wearing geisha clothes, as I was really into Japanese people". Faith No More also mentioned the duo and their performances. Their keyboardist Roddy Bottum said: "I saw Sparks play on American Bandstand in 1975. My sister and I went out and immediately bought Indiscreet. In 2004, Franz Ferdinand's lead vocalist and lead guitarist Alex Kapranos published an article in the NME titled, "why I love the Sparks". He said about their music: "It's only after a few listens you really can get into it ... Then you really fall in love and bands change your life. Now I can't imagine life without them." Guitarist John Frusciante of the Red Hot Chili Peppers said that he used to listen to Kimono My House and Propaganda for Adrian Fisher's guitar playing adding, "I'm sure that it is Ron Mael who told him what to play".

Other notable acts that have mentioned Sparks include Ween, Will Sheff of Okkervil River, Mark Burgess of the Chameleons, and Cait Brennan. French electronic music duo Justice hailed Sparks saying: "this is ... something we like in music, this kind of epic feeling, ... and we were really inspired by bands like Sparks ... who have this really operatic sound". In 2012, English synth-pop duo Spray released the song "Sparks Called and They Want Their Ideas Back".

In 1980, Paul McCartney of the Beatles also gave a nod to the duo in the music video for "Coming Up", in which he mimicked Ron Mael on keyboards. (Note: McCartney related that he liked shooting the clip of "Coming Up": "We got some very sophisticated computer system and I did the guy out of Sparks [Ron Mael], the keyboard played with a Hitler moustache".)

== Members ==
Current members

- Russell Mael – lead vocals (1968–present)
- Ron Mael – piano, keyboards, synthesizer, programming (1968–present)

Current auxiliary musicians

- Evan Weiss – guitar, backing vocals (2017–present)
- Eli Pearl – guitar, backing vocals (2018–present)
- Max Whipple – bass guitar, backing vocals (2022–present)
- Darren Weiss – drums, backing vocals (2025–present)

Former members

- Earle Mankey – guitar, backing and occasional lead vocals (1968–1973)
- James Mankey – bass guitar (1968–1973)
- Harley Feinstein – drums (1968–1973)
- Martin Gordon – bass guitar (1973–1974)
- Adrian Fisher – guitar (1974, died 2000)
- Norman "Dinky" Diamond – drums, percussion (1973–1975, died 2004)
- Trevor White – guitar (1974–1975)
- Ian Hampton – bass guitar (1974–1975, died 2026)

Former auxiliary musicians

- Sal Maida – bass guitar (1976; died 2025)
- Jeffrey Salen – guitar, backing vocals (1976)
- Mayo James McAllister – guitar (1976)
- Hilly Boy Michaels – drums (1976; died 2025)
- Leslie Bohem – bass guitar, backing vocals (1981–1986)
- Bob Haag – guitar, backing vocals (1981–1986)
- David Kendrick – drums (1981–1986)
- James Goodwin – synthesizer (1982–1983)
- Christi Haydon – drums, backing vocals (1994–1995)
- Tammy Glover – drums, backing vocals (1997–2009)
- Dean Menta – guitar (1997–2017)
- Jim Wilson – guitar, backing vocals (2006–2009)
- Steven Shane McDonald – bass guitar, backing vocals (2006–2008)
- Josh Klinghoffer – guitar (2006–2008)
- Marcus Blake – bass guitar, guitar, backing vocals (2008–2009)
- Steven Nistor – drums (2009–2024)
- Tyler Parkford – keyboards, backing vocals (2016–2022)
- Patrick Kelly – bass guitar, backing vocals (2020–2021)
- Alex Casnoff – keyboards, backing vocals (2020–2021)

== Awards and nominations ==
Award	Year	Nominee(s)	Category	Result	Ref.
Cannes Soundtrack Award	2021	Annette	Best Composer	Won	
Florida Film Critics Circle	2021	Annette	Best Score	Nominated	
César Awards	2022	Annette	Best Original Music	Won	
Lumière Awards	2022	Annette	Best Music	Won	
Mojo Awards	2006	Themselves	Inspiration Award	Nominated	
NME Awards	2022	The Sparks Brothers	Best Music Film	Won	
RSH-Gold Awards	1996	Themselves	Comeback of the Year	Won	

== Discography ==
=== Studio albums ===
- Halfnelson (1972, reissued as Sparks, 1972)
- A Woofer in Tweeter's Clothing (1972)
- Kimono My House (1974)
- Propaganda (1974)
- Indiscreet (1975)
- Big Beat (1976)
- Introducing Sparks (1977)
- Nº 1 in Heaven (1979)
- Terminal Jive (1980)
- Whomp That Sucker (1981)
- Angst in My Pants (1982)
- In Outer Space (1983)
- Pulling Rabbits Out of a Hat (1984)
- Music That You Can Dance To (1986)
- Interior Design (1988)
- Gratuitous Sax & Senseless Violins (1994)
- Plagiarism (1997)
- Balls (2000)
- Lil' Beethoven (2002)
- Hello Young Lovers (2006)
- Exotic Creatures of the Deep (2008)
- The Seduction of Ingmar Bergman (2009)
- Hippopotamus (2017)
- A Steady Drip, Drip, Drip (2020)
- The Girl Is Crying in Her Latte (2023)
- Mad! (2025)

=== EPs ===
- Madder! (2025)

=== Live albums ===
- Two Hands, One Mouth: Live in Europe (2013)
- Sparks Live on the Moon (2026)

=== Collaborative albums ===
- FFS (2015) (with Franz Ferdinand as FFS)

=== Soundtracks ===
- Annette (2021)
- The Sparks Brothers (2022)
- Annette – An Opera by Sparks (The Original 2013 Recordings) (2024)
