= Kimono My House =

Studio album by Sparks
- Released: May 1, 1974
- Recorded: December 1973 – February 1974
- Studios: Basing Street (London); AIR (London); Wessex Sound (London); Ramport (London)
- Genres: Glam rock; art rock
- Length: 36:19
- Label: Island
- Producer: Muff Winwood

Sparks chronology
A Woofer in Tweeter's Clothing (1973)	Kimono My House (1974)	Propaganda (1974)

Singles from Kimono My House
- 1. "This Town Ain't Big Enough for Both of Us" Released: April 1974; 2. "Amateur Hour" Released: July 1974; 3. "Hasta Mañana, Monsieur" Released: September 1974; 4. "Talent Is an Asset" Released: November 1974

Kimono My House is the third studio album by American rock band Sparks, released on May 1, 1974, by Island Records. The album is considered to be their commercial breakthrough, and was met with widespread acclaim.

Preceded by the single "This Town Ain't Big Enough for Both of Us", Kimono My House peaked at No. 4 in the UK and No. 101 in the US. Retrospectively, Kimono My House is considered one of Sparks's best works and one of the best glam rock albums.

== Background ==
In 1973, Ron and Russell Mael accepted an offer to relocate from Los Angeles to London in order to participate in the UK glam rock scene. The previous lineup of Earle Mankey, James Mankey and Harley Feinstein was replaced with English musicians; Martin Gordon, Adrian Fisher and Norman "Dinky" Diamond joined the band to play bass guitar, guitar and drums respectively. The band signed a recording contract with Island Records and recorded Kimono My House in 1974. Although the Mael brothers had wanted Roy Wood to produce the album, he was unavailable, so Muff Winwood was hired instead. Winwood remained with the group to produce the follow-up studio album Propaganda later in 1974.

== Title ==
The album gets its title from a line in one of its songs, "Hasta Mañana, Monsieur", and is a pun on the title of the 1951 song "Come On-a My House", made famous by American singer and actress Rosemary Clooney. The pun has precedents, however, in the track "Kimona My House" from jazz guitarist Dick Garcia's studio album A Message from Garcia (1956), and later in a season one episode of the television show That Girl entitled "Kimono My House".

== Sound ==
Musically, Kimono My House represented a shift in sound and a focusing of Ron Mael's songwriting (now the indisputable principal songwriter). Sparks' two studio albums with the Mankey brothers had been diverse albums that featured a number of different styles, such as a cover of Rodgers and Hammerstein's "Do-Re-Mi"; "Here Comes Bob", which was performed by a small string section; and "The Louvre", which mixed both English and French lyrics.

The new album embraced the more pop-oriented side of the Mael brothers' song-writing, which had previously been evident in songs such as "Wonder Girl" and "High C". Now, with challenging arrangements by the new English line-up and Winwood's simpler production, the songs were more focused. The album slotted in with the current popularity of glam rock, which was dominating the charts (in particular, the more experimental work of Roxy Music and David Bowie). Lyrically, the songs remained unusual and humorous; the band's pop-cultural references, puns and peculiar sexual content, sung in a countertenor vocal range by Russell Mael, set Sparks apart from other groups.

The particularity of their sound, which matched pop songwriting with complex lyrics, defined the group to their UK audience. Integral to the sound were Fisher's guitar playing and Gordon's Rickenbacker bass guitar. The novel input of these two competent and innovative musicians constituted a successful formula which was maintained only until the tour which followed the release of Kimono My House, with Gordon fired before the tour and Fisher afterwards.

The other key component of the Sparks sound in this period was Ron Mael's keyboard. On the previous two studio albums Ron had primarily used a Wurlitzer electronic piano, but he found that the instrument did not stand up well to the rigours of touring, because the metal reeds that generated the notes frequently broke. When the group relocated to the UK, Mael purchased an RMI Electra-Piano model 300. This instrument had three basic sound options (a piano sound, an organ sound and a harpsichord sound), but Mael used only the piano sound.

Although the basic tonal quality of the RMI was markedly inferior to a Wurlitzer or a Rhodes piano – Ron Mael later described it as "incredibly terrible" – it had several notable advantages for a touring musician. Unlike the electro-mechanical Wurlitzer and Rhodes, the RMI was a completely solid-state instrument, with each note generated by its own dedicated LC oscillator circuit, so it was both more robust and lighter than a Wurlitzer, and the tone generator circuits did not drift out of tune (which was a common problem for electronic keyboards at the time, like the Minimoog). Mael fed the instrument through an Echoplex tape delay unit, giving it the highly distinctive "shimmer" that features prominently on their breakthrough single "This Town Ain't Big Enough for Both of Us":

"It was the first time I was really aware that technology can give some kind of mystery to the sound. There was a kind of haunting quality to the RMI with the Echoplex. Real tape delay gave it a little of a wobbly feel. That sound, these days, you can approximate it, but to get that thing, you need the old gear. I'm not a big collector of vintage gear, but I kept that Echoplex, 'cause it's just such a beautiful machine."

The visuals were aided and abetted by the physical presence of the band. Ron and Russell milked their peculiar image, with Ron's toothbrush moustache, reserved wardrobe and usually silent demeanour sat in diametrical opposition to his younger brother's long curly hair and energetic and flamboyant stage persona. Taken together, the sound and look of the band caused a sensation, producing what seemed to the mass audience to be an "overnight success".

What sounds like a honking saxophone line at the end of "Equator" is in fact a Mellotron played by Ron Mael.

== Cover artwork ==
The concept for the cover came from Ron Mael, who was inspired by a Japanese World War II propaganda photograph he had seen in an old wartime edition of Life magazine. The original image depicted two Japanese women in traditional dress disdainfully holding their noses with one hand while holding a photograph of Winston Churchill; in place of the Churchill photo, Mael's homemade mockup substituted the cover of Sparks' previous studio album, A Woofer in Tweeter's Clothing.

The final version of the front cover was executed by the same team who created the classic early covers for Sparks' labelmates Roxy Music—Island Records Marketing Director Tim Clark, photographer Karl Stoecker and stylist Nick de Ville. It is notable for having neither the name of the band nor the album title on it.

The two women pictured, in kimono, were actresses Michi Hirota and Kuniko Okamura. They were members of Japan's Red Buddha Theatre headed by Stomu Yamashta, which was performing in London at the time. Interviewed in 2014, Hirota recalled:

We were both actresses touring with a Japanese theatre company in Europe and the USA. My husband Joji Hirota was musical director. A record company (Island records) approached our director looking for Japanese women, and we were asked to do the modeling. I am the woman on the right (with a fan). We were not told much, they just let us move freely. We didn't know how to arrange our hair properly or how to fix our kimono. There was nobody to dress us. The session took 4 or 5 hours. It had such an impact, however I thought that I looked bit ugly.

Asked if there were any other photos from the session, Hirota recalled: "Yes, I kept one Polaroid photo in which I looked rather cute, which Karl dropped on the floor. Hope this is OK with him. I keep it in my personal photo album. In 1980, Hirota would add vocals to David Bowie's "It's No Game (No. 1)", the opening track on his fourteenth studio album Scary Monsters (and Super Creeps).

The back cover includes the band name, the album title, list of songs and photos of the band members. The inner sleeve for the original vinyl record was printed with a full set of song lyrics on one side and a black and white photograph of the Mael brothers, framed in a spotlight, on the reverse.

== Release ==
Kimono My House became a popular release, peaking at No. 4 on the UK Albums Chart, and was awarded gold status by the British Phonographic Industry (BPI) in September 1974. The single "This Town Ain't Big Enough for Both of Us" was a surprise hit and reached No. 2 on the UK singles chart, being certified silver in June 1974. It was held off the top spot by the Rubettes' bubblegum pop song "Sugar Baby Love", which remained at No. 1 for four weeks. Sparks' second Island era single, "Amateur Hour", reached the top ten in the UK later that summer.

Outside the UK, Kimono My House and its singles made a significant impact across Europe, notably in Germany, where both singles reached No. 12. In the US, the album reached No. 101 on the Billboard 200. The band's two Bearsville Records albums had garnered critical praise but few sales; the only significant chart performance had been for "Wonder Girl", which had been a minor regional hit and had crept into the lower reaches of the Cashbox chart at No. 92. In place of "Amateur Hour", "Talent Is an Asset" was selected as the album's second single in the US, and the album's third in New Zealand.

== Critical reception and legacy ==
Professional ratings
Review scores
Source	Rating
AllMusic	4.5/5 stars
Classic Rock	9/10
Mojo	4/5 stars
Overdose	B+
Q	4/5 stars
Record Collector	4/5 stars

Upon its release, NME published an enthusiastic one page review dubbing the album "an instant classic". Reviewer Ian Mac Donald wrote that all of the songs "sound like standards", adding "this record makes you jump in every sense" before concluding: "Kimono My House is the real breakthrough – I think you're gonna love it". Sounds praised the freshness of the material, saying, "the music is completely new and innovative". Reviewing Kimono My House for Rolling Stone in 1974, Gordon Fletcher was complimentary of Ron Mael's "whimsical" lyrics, which he felt revealed "a unique (if slightly warped) perspective and a volatile sense of humor", but found that they tended to be obscured by Winwood's "obfuscating" production. Fletcher further criticized Russell Mael's singing on the album as "a disappointing stab at intelligible vocals". The Spokesman-Review's critic wrote that it was "the most invigorating appealing" album "that I've heard in longer than I can recall at the moment". Reviewer Robert Hilburn wrote that the songs were "rich with vigor" with "great harmonies and dynamic tempo changes".

English singer Morrissey, frontman and lyricist of the Smiths has frequently cited Kimono My House as one of his favorite albums and famously wrote a letter to the NME, at the age of 15, extolling its virtues. He later told the Mael brothers that it had been a key influence on him deciding to embark upon a music career. In 2010, Morrissey included it in a list of his 13 favorite albums of all time for The Quietus. Icelandic singer Björk has also named the album as one of her all-time favorites. Steve Jones, guitarist and composer for the Sex Pistols, also hailed the album, recalling that in 1974, "The first Be-Bop Deluxe album, Axe Victim, and Sparks' Kimono My House were both big albums for me and Cookie [Paul Cook]. We'd sit in his bedroom for hours listening to them". John Frusciante of the Red Hot Chili Peppers named Adrian Fisher's guitar playing on Kimono My House and its follow-up Propaganda as one of his influences for their eighth studio album By the Way (2002). The album was featured in Robert Dimery's book 1001 Albums You Must Hear Before You Die (2010). In 2020, the album was ranked at number 476 on Rolling Stone's list of the 500 greatest albums of all time. Thurston Moore of Sonic Youth described it as 'a surprise package of ingenuity and experimental rock song genius'.

== Re-release ==
Kimono My House was remastered and re-issued by Island in 1994 and 2006. The first issue by the Island Masters subsidiary added the non-album B-sides "Barbecutie" and "Lost and Found". The '21st Century Edition' added a live recording of "Amateur Hour" recorded by a subsequent (1975) line-up of the band and sleeve notes by Paul Lester, the deputy editor of Uncut.

Thank God It's Not Christmas
An audio sample of "Thank God It's Not Christmas"

A remastered 40th Anniversary Edition was released on December 15, 2014, on vinyl only, including previously unreleased demo material from the band's archives. Coinciding with the release the entire album was performed, along with the 35-piece Heritage Orchestra, at the Barbican Centre in London on December 19 and 20, where the band also performed brand new orchestral arrangements by Nathan Kelly. The programme also featured songs from their other 22 albums. The second date was added after the first night sold out.

As part of the live performance with the Heritage Orchestra, the band released the song "Thank God It's Not Christmas" as a single. Stewart Mason of AllMusic said:

“One of the many highlights on the phenomenal Kimono My House, "Thank God It's Not Christmas" is the archetypal song from Sparks’ Island Records era. Adrian Fisher's lead guitar and Ron Mael's piano duel insistently with a prominent string section, as Russell Mael sings an alternately wry and depressing lyric about the desire to find activities that distract oneself from a slowly disintegrating relationship. The lyrics are truly magnificent, both in their literal meaning and the way they work with the music, creating a rhythmic counter-melody that echoes Fisher's guitar line, and Muff Winwood’s crystal-clear production emphasizes the song's soaring, anthemic elements; although "Amateur Hour" and "This Town Ain’t Big Enough for Both of Us" were the hits and "Here In Heaven" is more beloved by fans, "Thank God It's Not Christmas" is possibly the album's highest point."

== Track listing ==
All tracks are written by Ron Mael, except where noted.

Side one
No.	Title	Length
1.	"This Town Ain't Big Enough for Both of Us"	3:05
2.	"Amateur Hour"	3:37
3.	"Falling in Love with Myself Again"	3:03
4.	"Here in Heaven"	2:48
5.	"Thank God It's Not Christmas"	5:07

Side two
No.	Title	Writer(s)	Length
6.	"Hasta Mañana, Monsieur"	Russell Mael; Ron Mael	3:52
7.	"Talent Is an Asset"		3:21
8.	"Complaints"		2:50
9.	"In My Family"	Russell Mael; Ron Mael	3:48
10.	"Equator"		4:42
Total length:			36:19

Island Masters bonus tracks (1994)
No.	Title	Length
11.	"Barbecutie"	3:07
12.	"Lost and Found"	3:19

21st Century Edition bonus tracks (2006)
No.	Title	Length
11.	"Barbecutie"	3:07
12.	"Lost and Found"	3:19
13.	"Amateur Hour (Live at Fairfield Halls, Croydon, November 9, 1975)" (Features the Indiscreet line-up of Sparks)	4:44

Side three – 40th Anniversary Edition (2014)
No.	Title	Writer(s)	Length
11.	"When I Take the Field on Friday" (1973 Demo)		2:45
12.	"Barbecutie" (1973 Demo)		2:56
13.	"Windy Day" (1973 Demo)	Ron Mael; Russell Mael	3:46
14.	"Marry Me" (1973 Demo)		3:07

Side four – 40th Anniversary Edition (2014)
No.	Title	Length
15.	"A More Constructive Use of Leisure Time" (1973 Demo)	3:37
16.	"Alabamy Right" (1973 Demo)	2:27
17.	"My Brains and Her Looks" (1973 Demo)	3:13

== Personnel ==
Credits are adapted from the Kimono My House liner notes.

Sparks

- Russell Mael – vocals
- Ron Mael – keyboards
- Martin Gordon – bass guitar
- Adrian Fisher – guitar
- Norman "Dinky" Diamond – drums, percussion, castanets

Production and artwork

- Muff Winwood – producer
- Richard Digby-Smith – recording engineer
- Tony Platt – recording engineer
- Bill Price – mixdown engineer
- Nick de Ville – art direction, cover concept
- Ron Mael – cover concept
- Karl Stoeker – photography
- Bob Bowkett, CCS – artwork

== Charts ==
=== Album ===
Chart (1974–75)	Peak position
Australia (Kent Music Report)	22
Canada Top Albums/CDs (RPM)	58
Dutch Albums (Album Top 100)	10
UK Albums (Official Charts)	4
US Billboard 200	101

=== Singles ===
"This Town Ain't Big Enough for Both of Us"
Chart (1974)	Peak position
Belgium (Ultratop 50 Flanders)	4
Belgium (Ultratop 50 Wallonia)	3
Netherlands (Single Top 100)	4
Netherlands (Dutch Top 40)	5
Switzerland (Schweizer Hitparade)	7
UK Singles (OCC)	2
West Germany (GfK)	12

"Amateur Hour"
Chart (1974)	Peak position
Belgium (Ultratop 50 Flanders)	22
Belgium (Ultratop 50 Wallonia)	36
Netherlands (Single Top 100)	6
Netherlands (Dutch Top 40)	9
UK Singles (OCC)	7
West Germany (GfK)	12

== Certifications ==
Region	Certification	Certified units/sales
United Kingdom (BPI)	Gold	100,000^{^}
^{^} Shipments figures based on certification alone.
