= Adrian Fisher (musician) =

British guitarist (1952–2000)

- Fisher with Sparks in 1974

Background information
- Born: 2 September 1952; Dulwich, London, England
- Died: 31 March 2000 (aged 47) Ko Samui, Thailand
- Genres: Rock
- Occupation: Guitarist
- Years active: 1970s–2000
- Formerly of: Boxer; The Four Squares; Sparks; Toby

Adrian Fisher (2 September 1952 – 31 March 2000) was an English guitarist and a member of the bands Toby (a spin off from the band Free), Sparks and Boxer. He played on Sparks' first two albums under Island Records, Kimono My House and Propaganda.

== Career ==
Prior to joining Sparks, Fisher was a member of Free bassist Andy Fraser's band Toby (with drummer Stan Speake), and briefly joined (former Skid Row) bassist Brush Shiels in the short-lived Brush. Fisher joined Sparks in 1973 and recorded the Kimono My House album in that year, along with Martin Gordon (bass) and Dinky Diamond (drums). He performed live with Sparks during the Kimono My House tour of the UK in 1974.

Following his dismissal from Sparks, Fisher joined Mike Patto's band Boxer in 1977, recording the album Absolutely for Epic Records. Other members of the band were ex-Grease Band keyboard player Chris Stainton, ex-Vanilla Fudge/Cactus bassist Tim Bogert, and drummer Eddie Tuduri. Fisher also joined the short-lived Sparks spin-off band The Four Squares along with Dinky Diamond.

== Later life ==
In the late 1980s he moved to Thailand and worked as a musician in Lamai Beach in Ko Samui and in Bangkok. In 1999, he was featured in the BBC documentary Expats.

== Death ==
Fisher died on 31 March 2000 following a performance in Ko Samui, Thailand; the official cause of death was myocardial infarction.
