= Artifact (album) =

Studio album by The Electric Prunes
- Released: October 31, 2001
- Recorded: 1999–2001
- Studio: Hole in the Sky Studio
- Genre: Psychedelic rock, garage rock, hard rock
- Length: 67:41
- Label: self released
- Producer: James Lowe, Mark Tulin

The Electric Prunes chronology
Just Good Old Rock and Roll (1969)	Artifact (2001)	California (2004)

Professional ratings
Review scores
Source	Rating
AllMusic	3/5 stars
The Encyclopedia of Popular Music	3/5 stars

Artifact is an album by The Electric Prunes, self-released in 2001. It was their first studio album since 1969.

The album is said to be the "real third" album by the band since past efforts did not include material by the actual group. The sleeve notes state that it "was the album we never got to make." It is a return to most of the band's original 1960s line-up.

== Track listing ==
1. "Lost Dream" (James Lowe, Mark Tulin) – 5:02
2. "7 and 7 Is" (Arthur Lee) – 3:15
3. "Big Stick" (Lowe, Tulin) – 2:56
4. "Last Night I Had A Dream" (Randy Newman) – 4:12
5. "Bullet Thru the Backseat" (Lowe, Tulin) – 5:15
6. "Phone Won't Ring" (Lowe, Tulin) – 4:53
7. "All About Wires" (Lowe, Tulin) – 6:03
8. "Devil's Candy" (Lowe, Tulin) – 2:47
9. "Analog Life" (Harris, Smith) – 4:35
10. "Mujo 22" – 8:09
11. "Castaway" (Lowe, Tulin) – 6:14
12. "Le Fire" – 3:17
13. "Halloween Ending" – 1:03
14. "Hard Time" (Lowe, Tulin) – 5:32
15. "Slobodon" – 4:30

== Personnel ==
=== Electric Prunes ===
- James Lowe – vocals, rhythm guitar, harmonica
- Ken Williams – lead guitar
- Mark Moulin – lead guitar
- Mark Tulin – bass
- Cameron Lowe – keyboards
- Joe Dooley – drums

=== Additional musicians ===
- Peter Lewis – guitar
- Michael "Quint" Weakley – drums
- Mike Vasquez – drums
- Jim Grippo – dotar

=== Technical ===
- James Lowe – producer, engineer
- Mark Tulin – associate producer
- Jeff Foss – mastering
- Laura Pezotti – design
- Randy Luczak – artwork
- Pamela Lowe – photography
- Electric Prunes – liner notes
