= Get Me to the World on Time =

Single by The Electric Prunes

from the album The Electric Prunes
- B-side: "Are You Lovin' Me More (But Enjoying It Less)"
- Released: March 1967
- Recorded: American Recording Company, Power House, Los Angeles, California, 1966
- Genre: Psychedelic rock; garage rock; space rock
- Length: 2:30
- Label: Reprise
- Songwriters: Annette Tucker, Jill Jones
- Producer: Dave Hassinger

The Electric Prunes singles chronology
"I Had Too Much to Dream (Last Night)" (1966)	"Get Me to the World on Time" (1967)	"Dr. Do-Good" (1967)

"Get Me to the World on Time" is a song written by Annette Tucker and Jill Jones for the American garage rock band, The Electric Prunes. The song was released in March 1967 following the success of the band's previous single, "I Had Too Much to Dream (Last Night)". Although the follow-up did not have the same success, "Get Me to the World on Time" still charted at number 27 on the Billboard Hot 100. The single also fared slightly better in Canada where it reached number 15. In the UK it reached number 42.

== History ==
=== Recording ===
The song was recorded at American Recording Company with multiple sound effects, and recording techniques which were highly complex. Similar to "I Had Too Much to Dream (Last Night)", the composition begins in low-range tones until the sudden shift. Singer James Lowe explained that the opening to the track is actually "[producer] Dave Hassinger groaning through a mike, into the tremolo of a Fender amp. It creates pulse-like overtones that sound like strings". Vocals by Lowe were initially soft until climbing to higher notes alongside the instrumentals. The instrumentals featured a Bo Diddley-styled riff (added by the band) played in the percussion, and given a psychedelic effect with a fuzz-distorted guitar. The band added in the rhythm while recording it in studio, one of the few times the group's input was accepted. They had sought to expand the track by including more electronic instrumentals and effects, but it was not allowed. The ending of the song, deemed the "spaceship", by playing the high E note on guitar until it reached the last fret, and an oscillator matched the peak.

=== Songwriting ===
Tucker and Jones wrote the song specifically for the Electric Prunes, deliberately including highly sexual (for the time) lyrics ("one kiss from you and my whole body starts to actin' strange, you shake up all my hormones, you put me through a change" etc.). The title refers to the song "Get Me to the Church on Time" from the 1956 musical My Fair Lady.

=== Release and performances ===
The track was released in March 1967, a few weeks after its inclusion on their debut album, and reached Top 40 success in the United States. It was the band's last single to chart in the Top 40. Despite the band's difficulty in mimicking the studio version at live performances, the song was a favorite among their fans. To compensate for the lack of sound effects, the band normally expanded the composition beyond its regular track length.

== Published appearances ==
=== Singles ===
- "Get Me to the World on Time" / "Are You Lovin' Me More (But Enjoying It Less)" – Reprise Records, #0564, US 1967
- "Get Me to the World on Time" / "Are You Lovin' Me More (But Enjoying It Less)" – Reprise Records, #RS.20564, UK 1967
- "Get Me to the World on Time" / "Are You Lovin' Me More (But Enjoying It Less)" – Reprise Records, #RA 0564, Germany 1967
- "Get Me to the World on Time" / "Are You Lovin' Me More (But Enjoying It Less)" – Reprise Records, #R21.057, South Africa 1967
- "Get Me to the World on Time" / "Are You Lovin' Me More (But Enjoying It Less)" – Reprise Records, #0564, Canada 1967
- "Get Me to the World on Time" / "Are You Lovin' Me More (But Enjoying It Less)" – Reprise Records, #Fg 30095, Greece 1967

=== Albums/Compilations ===
- (I Had) Too Much to Dream Last Night – 1967
- Nuggets Vol 6: Punk, Part 2 – 1985
- Long Day's Flight – 1986
- Classic Rock:Rock Renaissance – 1989
- Psychedelic Years Revisited – 1994
- Psychedelic Perceptions – 1996
- Stockholm '67 – 1997 (Live)
- Nuggets:Original Artyfacts From the First Psychedelic Era 1965–1968 (1998 Reissue) – 1998
- Lost Dreams – 2001
- Rhino Hi-Five: The Electric Prunes – 2007
- The Complete Reprise Singles – 2012

== Personnel ==
- James Lowe – vocals, rhythm guitar, autoharp, tambourine
- Mark Tulin – bass guitar, piano, organ
- Ken Williams – lead guitar
- James Spagnola – vocals, rhythm guitar
- Preston Ritter – drums, percussion

== Cover versions ==
There have been several notable remakes by other artists including:

- The Demics, on their 1996 album, New York City.
- The Strawberry Zots, on their 1989 album, Cars, Flowers, Telephones.
- Lick the Tins, on their 1995 album, Blind Man on a Flying Horse. The band recorded the song as a contemporary folk piece.
- The Physicals, in a 1978 demo recording that was released in the 1999 compilation album, Skulduggery.
