= Easy Rider (soundtrack) =

1969 soundtrack album by various artists

Soundtrack album by Various artists
- Released: August 1969
- Genres: Soundtrack; rock
- Length: 37:38
- Labels: ABC-Dunhill; Reprise
- Producer: Various artists

Singles from Easy Rider
- 1. "Ballad of Easy Rider" Released: August 1969

Easy Rider is the soundtrack to the cult classic 1969 film Easy Rider. The songs that make up the soundtrack were carefully selected to form a "musical commentary" within the film. The album of the soundtrack was released by ABC-Dunhill Records in August 1969 (catalog no. DSX 50063). It peaked at number six on the Billboard 200 chart in September of that year, and was certified gold in January 1970.

== Description ==
The songs on the soundtrack album are sequenced in the same order as they appear in the film, with the following differences:

- "The Weight", as originally recorded by The Band for their 1968 debut album Music From Big Pink, was used in the film but could not be licensed for the soundtrack. To deal with this, ABC-Dunhill commissioned Smith, who recorded for the label at the time, to record a cover version of the song for the soundtrack album.
- The Electric Flag's "Flash, Bam, Pow" appears only partially in the movie, omitting the unnerving begin and end, using only the rhythmic middle part. Originally recorded by the Electric Flag for Roger Corman's 1967 film The Trip, with Peter Fonda and Dennis Hopper plus Jack Nicholson as screenwriter, it was acknowledged in the Easy Rider closing credits but was omitted from the soundtrack album.
- Little Eva's "Let's Turkey Trot" is playing on the jukebox when the protagonists enter the café, thus this 1963 song was ambient sound and not a chosen song like the other, contemporary ones; it was acknowledged in the film's closing credits but omitted from the soundtrack album.

Distribution of the album transferred from the ABC-Dunhill label to Warner Bros. Records' Reprise Records subsidiary (catalog no. MS 2026) in late 1969. Easy Rider subsequently went out of print, but was reissued in June 2000 by the Universal Music Group's MCA Records label, which had acquired the ABC and Dunhill labels in 1979.

Professional ratings
Review scores
| Source | Rating |
|---|---|
| Allmusic | link |
| Pitchfork | 8.6/10 |

== Track listing ==
Most of the tracks on the Easy Rider soundtrack were previously released on other albums by their respective artists.

On LP, cassette and reel-to-reel releases of Easy Rider, tracks 1–5 appeared as side 1, and tracks 6–10 as side 2.

1. "The Pusher" (Hoyt Axton) – 5:49
  - Steppenwolf – Steppenwolf (1968)
2. "Born to Be Wild" (Mars Bonfire) – 3:37
  - Steppenwolf – Steppenwolf (1968)
3. "The Weight" (Jaime Robbie Robertson) – 4:29
  - Smith (1969)
4. "Wasn't Born to Follow" (Carole King/Gerry Goffin) – 2:03
  - The Byrds – The Notorious Byrd Brothers (1968)
5. "If You Want to Be a Bird (Bird Song)" (Antonia Duren) – 2:35
  - The Holy Modal Rounders – The Moray Eels Eat The Holy Modal Rounders (1969)
6. "Don't Bogart Me" (Elliot Ingber/Larry Wagner) – 3:05
  - Fraternity of Man – Fraternity of Man (1968)
7. "If 6 Was 9" (Jimi Hendrix) – 5:35
  - The Jimi Hendrix Experience – Axis: Bold as Love (1967)
8. "Kyrie Eleison/Mardi Gras (When the Saints)" (Traditional, arranged by David Axelrod) – 4:00
  - The Electric Prunes – Mass in F Minor (1968)
9. "It's Alright, Ma (I'm Only Bleeding)" (Bob Dylan) – 3:39
  - Roger McGuinn (1969)
10. "Ballad of Easy Rider" (Roger McGuinn/Bob Dylan) – 2:14
  - Roger McGuinn (1969)

== 2004 deluxe edition ==
=== Disc one ===
Remastered re-release of the original 1969 soundtrack.

=== Disc two - Something in the Air: 1967 – 1969 ===
1. "Pushin' Too Hard" (Sky Saxon)
  - The Seeds – The Seeds (1966)
2. "I Had Too Much to Dream (Last Night)" (Annette Tucker (music)/Nancie Mantz (lyrics))
  - The Electric Prunes – The Electric Prunes: I Had Too Much to Dream (Last Night) (1967)
3. "(We Ain't Got) Nothin' Yet" (Ron Gilbert, Ralph Scala, and Mike Esposito)
  - Blues Magoos – Psychedelic Lollipop (1966)
4. "San Franciscan Nights" (Eric Burdon/Vic Briggs/John Weider/Barry Jenkins/Danny McCulloch)
  - Eric Burdon & the Animals – Winds of Change (1967)
5. "White Rabbit" (Grace Slick)
  - Jefferson Airplane – Surrealistic Pillow (1967)
6. "I Can See for Miles" (Pete Townshend)
  - The Who – The Who Sell Out (1967)
7. "A Whiter Shade of Pale" (Keith Reid/Gary Brooker/Matthew Fisher)
  - Procol Harum – Procol Harum (1967)
8. "Groovin'" (Felix Cavaliere and Eddie Brigati)
  - The Young Rascals – Groovin' (1967)
9. "High Flyin' Bird" (Billy Edd Wheeler)
  - Richie Havens – Mixed Bag (1967)
10. "The Weight" (Jaime Robbie Robertson)
  - The Band – Music From Big Pink (1968)
11. "You Ain't Goin' Nowhere" (Bob Dylan)
  - The Byrds – Sweetheart of the Rodeo (1968)
12. "Time Has Come Today" (Willie Chambers/Joseph Chambers)
  - The Chambers Brothers – The Time Has Come (1967)
13. "With a Little Help from My Friends" (John Lennon/Paul McCartney)
  - Joe Cocker – With a Little Help from My Friends (1969)
14. "Summertime Blues" (Eddie Cochran)
  - Blue Cheer – Vincebus Eruptum (1968)
15. "Nights in White Satin" (Justin Hayward)
  - The Moody Blues – Days of Future Passed (1967)
16. "Mendocino" (Doug Sahm)
  - Sir Douglas Quintet – Mendocino (1969)
17. "Get Together" (Chet Powers)
  - The Youngbloods – The Youngbloods (1967)
18. "My Uncle" (Chris Hillman/Gram Parsons)
  - The Flying Burrito Brothers – The Gilded Palace of Sin (1969)
19. "Something in the Air" (Speedy Keen)
  - Thunderclap Newman – Hollywood Dream (1969)

== Charts ==
| Chart (1969–70) | Peak position |
|---|---|
| Australia (Kent Music Report) | 4 |
| Canada Top Albums/CDs (RPM) | 3 |
| Dutch Albums (Album Top 100) | 10 |
| German Albums (Offizielle Top 100) | 4 |
| Norwegian Albums (VG-lista) | 5 |
| UK Albums (Official Charts) | 2 |
| US Billboard 200 | 6 |
