= Underground (The Electric Prunes album) =

Studio album by The Electric Prunes
- Released: August 1967
- Recorded: 1967
- Studios: American Recording Co., Studio City, California
- Genres: Garage rock; psychedelic rock
- Length: 41:30
- Label: Reprise
- Producer: David Hassinger

The Electric Prunes chronology
The Electric Prunes (1967)	Underground (1967)	Mass in F Minor (1968)

Singles from Underground
- 1. "Dr. Do-Good" Released: June 1967; 2. "The Great Banana Hoax" Released: July 1967

Professional ratings
Review scores
Source	Rating
Allmusic	3.5/5 stars
Encyclopedia of Popular Music	3/5 stars
Uncut	8/10

Underground is the second studio album by American garage rock band The Electric Prunes, released in 1967 on Reprise Records. It would be the final album of any materialized input by band members until the 1969 "New Improved" Electric Prunes were formed. The album was a moderate chart hit, but without a hit single, the band could not repeat their past success.

In 2011, it was included in NME's "The 100 Greatest Albums You've Never Heard" list, chosen by Andrew VanWyngarden of MGMT.

== Background ==
Underground brought changes to the band once recording began, as limited lyrical input plagued the band's creative process on their debut. Only two original tracks, one composed by James Lowe titled “Train For Tomorrow” and one composed by Mark Tulin and Lowe titled "Luvin'", were included on their first album. This changed with Underground due to producer Dave Hassinger not being as active in the sessions, resulting in nine of the 12 tracks becoming the band's own material. With considerably more musical freedom, the band could mold their music into their own image, and the final product was a more direct and cohesive set of songs that reflected the band's own design.

The band continued in their utilization of distorted sound effects, fuzz-toned guitar instrumentals, and experimented with a Vox organ. Regarding the playing of the organ Lowe said, "They brought a prototype in, and took it back after they heard what we did with it." Near the end of recording, however, two band members left. Preston Ritter's departure stemmed from musical differences, and James Spagnola left due to medical issues. Their replacements were original drummer Michael Fortune and new member Mike Gannon. As a result of being brought in late, Fortune appeared on five tracks and only two included Gannon. Gannon is also featured on the non-album single "Everybody Knows (You're Not in Love)".

Underground was released in August 1967 and became a moderate success, reaching number 172 nationally, though without a hit single, the album could not reach more popularity. This lineup consisting of Tulin, Lowe, Williams, Fortune, and Gannon would tour to promote the album, playing across the US in prestigious venues like The Crystal Ballroom in Portland. Until the band reunited 30 years later, this lineup was the only version of the group to tour Europe. A live album called Stockholm '67 was recorded from a concert on this tour and released in 1997.

== Track listing ==
Side one

1. "The Great Banana Hoax" (James Lowe, Mark Tulin) – 4:09
2. "Children of Rain" (Goodie Williams, Ken Williams) – 2:37
3. "Wind-Up Toys" (Lowe, Tulin) – 2:26
4. "Antique Doll" (Nancy Mantz, Annette Tucker) – 3:13
5. "It's Not Fair" (Lowe, Tulin) – 2:04
6. "I Happen to Love You" (Gerry Goffin, Carole King) – 3:15

Side two

1. "Dr. Do-Good" (Mantz, Tucker) – 2:26
2. "I" (Mantz, Tucker) – 5:14
3. "Hideaway" (Lowe, Tulin) – 2:42
4. "Big City" (Johnny Walsh, Dan Walsh) – 2:46
5. "Captain Glory" (Lowe) – 2:14
6. "Long Day's Flight" (Michael "Quint" Weakley, Don Yorty) – 3:12

=== CD bonus tracks ===
1. "Everybody Knows You're Not in Love" (Lowe, Tulin) – 3:05
2. "You've Never Had It Better" (Steve Poncher, R. Schwartz, P. Snagster) – 2:07

== Personnel ==
=== Musicians ===
- James Lowe – vocals, autoharp, harmonica
- Ken Williams – lead guitar, effects
- James "Weasel" Spagnola – rhythm guitar, vocals (tracks 2–11, 13)
- Mike Gannon (uncredited) – rhythm guitar (tracks 1, 12, 14)
- Mark Tulin – bass, organ, piano
- Michael "Quint" Weakley – drums (tracks 2, 4, 8, 11–12)
- Preston Ritter (uncredited) – drums (tracks 1, 3, 5–7, 9–10)

=== Technical ===
- Dave Hassinger – producer, liner notes
- Richie Podolor – engineer
- Bill Cooper – engineer
- Ed Thrasher – art director
- Tom Tucker – photography

== Covers ==
The track "Wind-Up Toys" was recorded as a demo by the psychedelic rock band Opal Butterfly in 1968. It has been included in psychedelic rock compilations including Psychedelic Schlemiels.

== Charts ==
Chart (1967)	Peak position
US Billboard Top LPs	172
