= I Corvi =

Italian beat group

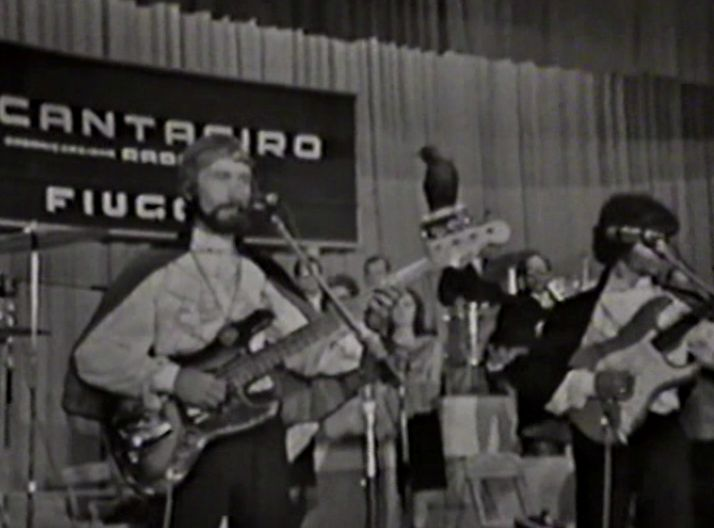
I Corvi at the 1966 Cantagiro

I Corvi (Italian for "The Crows") is an Italian beat group who were successful in the 1960s.

The group was formed in Parma in 1965, to perform cover versions of popular American and British records. The original members were Angelo Ravasini (vocals, guitar), Fabrizio "Billo" Levati (guitar), Italo "Gimmi" Ferrari (bass), and Claudio Benassi (drums). In early 1966, they took part in the first Rapallo Davoli national singing competition, finishing second. They were signed by Ariston Records, whose director, Alfredo Rossi, encouraged them to use a stage costume of black capes, and to always appear with a stuffed raven, either attached to the bass guitar or, in publicity photos, on the shoulder of one of the band members; the band duly christened the raven "Alfredo".

Their first record, "Un Ragazzo di Strada" ("A Street Kid"), was a rewriting of The Brogues' "I Ain't No Miracle Worker", written by Annette Tucker and Nancie Mantz and with new Italian lyrics by Nicola Salerno and Franco Califano. The song was entered in the 1966 Cantagiro musical contest, becoming a popular success and the group's biggest hit.

The group followed up with a version of "Bang, Bang" (written by Sonny Bono and originally recorded by Cher), and their first album, Un Ragazzo di Strada, which included versions of two Donovan songs. Later successful singles included "Sospesa ad un Filo" ("Hanging by a thread", a rewrite of The Electric Prunes' "I Had Too Much to Dream (Last Night)", also written by Tucker and Mantz), "Bambolina" (a version of "Any Day Now", co-written by Burt Bacharach), and "Datemi un biglietto d'aereo" (a version of The Box Tops' hit "The Letter", written by Wayne Carson). Levati and Ferrari left the group in 1969 and were replaced by guitarist Antonello Gabelli, keyboard player Massimo Vessella, and bassist Ennio Tricomi, but shortly afterwards, the group disbanded.

Ravasini formed a new group, Angelo ei Corvissimi, while Benassi and Tricomi formed another group, I Nuovi Corvi ("The New Crows"), with Pino Corvino (guitar) and Giancarlo Lazzini (keyboards). They continued to perform until 1972. In 1983, I Corvi re-formed with a line-up of Ravasini, Ferrari, Tricomi, and Gabelli, and in 1989 recorded the album Hanno preso la Bastiglia! ("They took the Bastille!") in a hard rock style. Gianluca Antolini later replaced Ferrari on bass, but the band continued to perform, with some further changes of personnel, until the late 1990s. Around 2000, Ravasini reconstituted the band with his sons Stefano and Luigi Ravasini, and other musicians.

After leaving the band, Fabrizio "Billo" Levati became a club and radio DJ; he died in 2000, aged 53. Gimmi Ferrari died in 2006, and Angelo Ravasini in 2013. In 2014 the band was reformed by the original drummer Claudio Benassi. The renewed group started live promotion touring Italy. In 2017 a new album of rearranged songs was released. In 2020 a new song, the first original since 1989, "L'ultimo dei Corvi", was released. In 2021 Benassi wrote the official biography of the band.
