= A Woofer in Tweeter's Clothing =

Studio album by Sparks
- Released: October 1972
- Studio: ID Sound at La Brea; Walley Heider Studios
- Genre: Glam rock; avant-rock
- Length: 39:56
- Label: Bearsville
- Producer: Thaddeus James Lowe

Sparks chronology
Sparks (1972)	A Woofer in Tweeter's Clothing (1972)	Kimono My House (1974)

Singles from A Woofer in Tweeter's Clothing
- 1. "Girl from Germany" Released: June 1974

A Woofer in Tweeter's Clothing is the second studio album by the American rock band Sparks. It was released in October 1972 and includes the single "Girl from Germany". It was the last release by the original five-member incarnation of Sparks.

The album was recorded and mixed at ID Sound at La Brea and Walley Heider Studios, and produced by Thaddeus James Lowe, then Todd Rundgren's engineer and former lead singer of The Electric Prunes, receiving mixed to positive reviews. The artwork was photographed by Larry DuPont and Ron Mael.

== Release ==
A Woofer in Tweeter's Clothing was released in October 1972. It was not very successful and did not reach the Billboard 200 in the US. After the group's surprise success in the UK, "Girl from Germany" was belatedly released as a single there but did not chart.

The album did, however, lead to a tour of the United Kingdom, including a residency at the Marquee in London, which, despite much heckling during performances, helped them to secure a significant cult following. An appearance on the BBC Television's Old Grey Whistle Test led to wider interest, regardless of a cold reception from the show's host Bob Harris.

== Re-issue ==
A Woofer in Tweeter's Clothing has been re-released numerous times since 1973. It is often packaged with its predecessor Sparks. One such re-issue was released in 1975 to capitalize on the group's success in the UK. This version was titled 2 Originals of Sparks and was packaged as a double-LP in a gatefold sleeve with a 14-page booklet.

In 1988, the album was first issued on CD, again in tandem with the first Sparks album, but in order to fit both programs within the constraints of a single disc, the last four tracks of the album were mastered at a higher speed than on the original LP, shortening the running time to 39:27. Though the album has subsequently been reissued in a standalone format, including the most recent reissue on Rhino Encore, released in 2008, the sped-up master has continued to be used.

== Reception ==
Professional ratings
Review scores
Source	Rating
Allmusic	4.5/5 stars

Patrick Gillings of the now-defunct alternative magazine Syracuse New Times was highly favorable of the record, noting its "imagination and humor" and remarking that Sparks "are a band to put a huge shot of adrenalin in a gasping form of art."

== Track listing ==
Side one
No.	Title	Writer(s)	Length
1.	"Girl from Germany"	Russell Mael, Ron Mael	3:26
2.	"Beaver O'Lindy"	Ron Mael, Russell Mael, Earle Mankey, Jim Mankey, Harley Feinstein	3:44
3.	"Nothing Is Sacred"	Ron Mael	5:31
4.	"Here Comes Bob"	Ron Mael, Russell Mael	2:09
5.	"Moon Over Kentucky"	Ron Mael, lyrics: Jim Mankey	4:08

Side two
No.	Title	Writer(s)	Length
6.	"Do Re Mi"	Richard Rodgers, Oscar Hammerstein II	3:38
7.	"Angus Desire"	Ron Mael, Russell Mael	3:25
8.	"Underground"	Earle Mankey	2:59
9.	"The Louvre"	Ron Mael; French Translation by Josée Becker	5:04
10.	"Batteries Not Included"	Ron Mael	0:47
11.	"Whippings and Apologies"	Ron Mael	5:05

== Personnel ==
Sparks

- Russell Mael - vocals
- Ron Mael - keyboards
- Earle Mankey - guitar
- Jim Mankey - bass
- Harley Feinstein - drums

Technical

- Thaddeus James Lowe - producer
- Larry DuPont - photography
- Rod Dyer - graphic design (Sparks logo)
