= California (The Electric Prunes album) =

Studio album by The Electric Prunes
- Released: May 28, 2004
- Recorded: 2004
- Studio: Hole In The Sky Studio; Sound Logic Studio
- Genre: Psychedelic rock
- Length: 53:19
- Label: Prunetwang
- Producer: James Lowe, Mark Tulin

The Electric Prunes chronology
Artifact (2001)	California (2004)	Feedback (2006)

Professional ratings
Review scores
Source	Rating
Allmusic	3.5/5 stars
Encyclopedia of Popular Music	3/5 stars

California is the seventh album by The Electric Prunes, released in 2004 and featuring founding members James Lowe, Ken Williams, and Mark Tulin.

The tracks on the album revolve around the Summer of Love in California and life after it.

== Track listing ==
All tracks composed by James Lowe and Mark Tulin.

1. "Sideshow Charade" – 3:39
2. "49 Songs" – 3:44
3. "I Never Knew What You Wanted" – 3:36
4. "Makin' Some Noise" – 3:07
5. "Pacific Ocean Blue" – 4:56
6. "I'll Drag You Home" – 2:40
7. "Rosy Made Me Crazy" – 3:52
8. "Transient Absolution" – 3:55
9. "Tidal Wave" – 4:47
10. "Rewired" – 3:49
11. "Running with Scissors" – 4:32
12. "The Rickenbacker 12 String" – 6:40
13. "Cinema Verite" – 7:22

== Personnel ==
=== The Electric Prunes ===
- James Lowe – vocals, guitar, harmonica
- Mark Tulin – bass
- Ken Williams – lead guitar
- Joe Dooley – drums
- Mark Moulin – rhythm guitar

=== Additional musicians ===
- Peter Lewis – 12 string guitar (tracks 12–13), acoustic guitar (track 1), baritone guitar (track 9), background vocals (tracks 1–3, 5, 7, 10, 12–13)
- Bandshee Meeks – background vocals (tracks 1, 13)
- Frank Palmer – fretless bass (track 13)
- Jim Tamborello – saxophone, horns (tracks 9, 13)
- Ian van der Molen – drums (tracks 1–3, 6–7, 12)

=== Technical ===
- James Lowe – producer, engineer
- Mark Tulin – producer
- Tony Ripartetti – mastering
- Randy Luczak – design
- Rudi "Fuzztone" Protrudi – cover art
- Pamela Lowe – photography
