= Thus Always to Tyrants (album) =

Studio album by Scott Miller
- Released: June 12, 2001
- Genre: Alternative country
- Length: 41:03
- Label: Sugar Hill Records
- Producer: R.S. Field

Scott Miller chronology
Are You with Me? (2000)	Thus Always to Tyrants (2001)	Upside Downside (2003)

Thus Always to Tyrants is a 2001 album released by alternative country musician Scott Miller, and the first album credited to Scott Miller & the Commonwealth. It was Miller's first full-length album release after the breakup of his previous band, The V-Roys.

== Background ==
Miller was one of the leaders of The V-Roys, an alternative country band that was on Steve Earle's E-Squared Records, and described as "a critically acclaimed, commercially under appreciated" band with a "tasty brand of roots rock". When explaining his decision to begin a solo career, Miller said that the band reached their creative peak, some band members did not like touring, and that Earle lost interest.

== Recording ==
Shortly after The V-Roys broke up, Miller secured a publishing deal with Welk Music Group. In May 2000, he recorded four songs with Nashville producer R.S. Field and veteran Nashville session musicians. These songs reflected a classic rock 'n' roll sound. Field said, "We were going for a full-bodied sound, without trying to just ape yesterday. Obviously Neil Young, obviously [Tom] Petty, and then some of the British stuff too."

Miller was able to secure a deal with Sugar Hill Records, despite the label's preference of acoustic acts. Miller and Field brought in experienced musicians for the subsequent recordings, including members of Knoxville's Superdrag, The Judybats, David Grissom, and bluegrass musician Tim O'Brien.

== Themes ==
The album's title, Thus always to tyrants is a translation of the official motto of the state of Virginia (Sic semper tyrannis in Latin). The album cover is also Virginia's state seal. This is reflective of the themes on the album; Miller lyrics are both autobiographical about his life in Virginia, and also of his family's history in the Shenandoah Valley.

Miller stated that he "tried to make a whole record all about Virginia, about my past, about moving to Tennessee" and "going from a boy to a man". A review summarized that Miller "dug into his family history in places like Augusta, Highland and Bath counties and unearthed letters and tales from the Civil War". Another review described the album as "mingling themes from Virginia-related historical fables and current-day experiences of self-discovery and maturity with musical styles that veer from dynamic pop with gigantic rock hooks to a soulful Appalachian-style hymn". No Depression writes, "The overall sense is of a newfound and stubbornly won acceptance of responsibility and purpose". Relocation and starting over is another theme noted.

Two songs on the album are based on letters that Miller's great-great-grandfather sent home from his time serving in the Confederacy in the Civil War. Noted Appalachian musicians Tim O'Brien and Dirk Powell played on these songs.

Miller explained how the Civil War relates to his upbringing of growing up in the South with a father from north of the Mason–Dixon line, and the themes on the album:

My father is Pennsylvania Dutch. Sometimes I felt like we fought that war over and over and over when I was a teenager. A battle of wills. He was the breadwinner who told me what to do, and I was the skinny kid who was mule-stubborn. Much like that war. Two sides who felt they were morally right and bullied and backed themselves into a corner over 80 years until it came to blows. It was stupid. Not glamorous at all. Fought by poor men for rich men. No defense for it. Most of that war was fought in my backyard. There are still trenches all over Virginia, what builders haven't bulldozed over. How could it not be in my conscious? People died there.

The album features a cover of "Miracle Man", a song by the 1960s psychedelic rock band The Brogues, which Miller said fit in well with the album's themes.

== Reception ==
Professional ratings
Review scores
Source	Rating
Allmusic	4/5 stars
Associated Press	(favorable)
Austin Chronicle	4/5 stars
The New York Times	(extremely favorable)
PopMatters	(favorable)

Thus Always to Tyrants received significant praise from a variety of publications. Neil Strauss of the New York Times writes that Miller is "this year's Ryan Adams, a talented singer-songwriter emerging from a cult band (the V-Roys) with an astonishingly good solo album". The Austin Chronicle wrote that the album is "packed with one well-crafted song after another" and that "Miller covers a lot of musical territory. That he does so with a refined touch, in a way that makes you think, certifies him as one of a rare breed of songwriters and makes Thus Always to Tyrants an unqualified success". Miller's ability to combine rock 'n' roll with folk was also commended.

An Associated Press article praised the album by declaring, "This has the feel of a breakout album, one that music fans will look back on and think, 'That's when I knew he was going to be great.'" The Tennessean's review describes the album as "Personal, powerful and jacked up with red-blooded Southern pop intensity". No Depression complimented Miller's singing, and described the album as, "pop hooks, rock rave-ups and campfire melodies galore, showcasing the range of Miller's influences and his effortless absorption and reconfiguration of them". PopMatters wrote that the "relationship" songs on the album are the strongest, and praised the "catchy roots-pop" and Miller's versatility.

== Track listing ==
Song	Writer(s)	Length
"Across the Line"	Scott Miller	4:09
"I Made a Mess of This Town"	Scott Miller	3:19
"Loving That Girl"	Scott Miller	4:27
"I Won't Go With You"	Scott Miller	3:15
"Yes, I Won't"	Scott Miller	4:24
"Dear Sarah"	Scott Miller	2:59
"Highland County Boy"	Scott Miller	2:42
"Absolution"	Scott Miller	3:20
"Miracle Man"	Annette Tucker & Nancie Mantz	4:02
"Daddy Raised a Boy"	Scott Miller	3:00
"Goddamn the Sun"	Scott Miller	1:53
"Is There Room on the Cross for Me"	Scott Miller	3:24

== Personnel ==
- Scott Miller – guitar, vocals
- Mike Brignadello – bass
- Chris Carmichael – strings
- Don Coffey Jr. – drums
- John Davis – bass, guitar, vocals
- Jim DeMain – engineer, mastering, mixing
- R.S. Field – percussion, producer
- Eric Fritsch – keyboards
- David Grissom – electric guitar
- Peg Hambright – piano
- Greg Morrow – drums
- Tim O'Brien – fiddle, vocals
- Dirk Powell – banjo
