= The Electric Prunes (album) =

Studio album by The Electric Prunes
- Released: February 1967
- Recorded: 1966
- Studios: American Recording Co., Studio City, California; Power House, No., Hollywood, California
- Genres: Psychedelic rock; garage rock
- Length: 29:47
- Label: Reprise
- Producer: David Hassinger

The Electric Prunes chronology
The Electric Prunes (1967)	Underground (1967)

Singles from The Electric Prunes
- 1. "I Had Too Much to Dream (Last Night)" Released: November 1966; 2. "Get Me to the World on Time" Released: March 1967

Professional ratings
Review scores
Source	Rating
AllMusic	4/5 stars
Encyclopedia of Popular Music	3/5 stars

The Electric Prunes, sometimes referred to as I Had Too Much to Dream (Last Night), is the debut album by American garage rock band The Electric Prunes, released in 1967 on Reprise Records. The album's opening track, "I Had Too Much to Dream (Last Night)", was a hit single and became the band's signature tune. The album also contains another notable psychedelic rock composition, "Get Me to the World on Time". The album was listed in the book 1001 Albums You Must Hear Before You Die.

== Background ==
The success of "I Had Too Much to Dream (Last Night)", which charted at number 11 in the U.S. and at number 49 in the UK, prompted the band to tour more and record adverts. The band was featured in publicity photos for the November 1967 issue of Teen Pin-Ups. They also recorded an advert for the Vox wah-wah pedal and promoted use of the equipment in the Vox Teen Beat magazine. Following the band's extensive promotional campaign, a second single, "Get Me to the World on Time", was released and charted at number 27 in the U.S.

With the band having a busy touring schedule, the recording of the album was hurried in an effort to cash in on their recent success. The band was already composing material for what they hoped would be an album of their own design. However, much of the album's content was out of their control, as producer Dave Hassinger brought in the songwriting team of Annette Tucker and Nancie Mantz. They, alone, produced seven of the 12 tracks, much to the frustration of the band. Mark Tulin and James Lowe, the band's main songwriters, were limited to just one track, the song "Luvin'". The band considered some of the tracks to be filler and were disappointed in not having a choice in disclosing them. Tulin stated, "We had nothing resembling freedom, let alone total freedom, in the selection of our songs. Consequently, there are definitely songs that I do believe didn't belong on the album..."

== Release ==
The album was released in late February 1967 and peaked at number 113 on the Billboard Top LPs chart.

== Music ==
According to BrooklynVegan, "the band were talented enough to add weird psych flourishes throughout which gave the straight ahead pop style write-ups a decided edge."

== Track listing ==
Adapted from AllMusic.

Side One
No.	Title	Composer(s)	Length
1.	"I Had Too Much to Dream (Last Night)"	Nancie Mantz, Annette Tucker	2:55
2.	"Bangles"	Johnny Walsh	2:27
3.	"Onie"	Mantz, Tucker	2:43
4.	"Are You Lovin' Me More (But Enjoying It Less)"	Mantz, Tucker	2:21
5.	"Train for Tomorrow"	James Lowe, Mark Tulin	3:00
6.	"Sold to the Highest Bidder"	Mantz, Tucker	2:16

Side Two
No.	Title	Composer(s)	Length
7.	"Get Me to the World on Time"	Jill Jones, Tucker	2:30
8.	"About a Quarter to Nine"	Al Dubin, Harry Warren	2:07
9.	"The King Is in the Counting House"	Mantz, Tucker	2:00
10.	"Luvin'"	Lowe, Tulin	2:03
11.	"Try Me on for Size"	Jill Jones, Tucker	2:19
12.	"The Toonerville Trolley"	Mantz, Tucker	2:34
Total length:			29:15

CD bonus tracks
No.	Title	Composer(s)	Length
13.	"Ain't It Hard"	Roger Tillison, Terrye Tillison	2:14
14.	"Little Olive"	Lowe, Tulin	2:40
Total length:			34:09

== Personnel ==
The Electric Prunes

- James Lowe – lead vocals (tracks 1, 2, 5–14), autoharp, rhythm guitar, tambourine
- Ken Williams – lead guitar
- James "Weasel" Spagnola – rhythm guitar, backing vocals, lead vocals (tracks 3, 4)
- Mark Tulin – bass guitar, piano, organ
- Preston Ritter – drums, percussion

Technical

- Dave Hassinger – producer, liner notes
- Richie Podolor – engineer
- Bill Cooper – assistant engineer
- Perry Botkin Jr. – string and brass arrangements
- Ed Thrasher – art director
- Jane McCowan – photography
