= Kol Nidre (disambiguation) =

Kol Nidre is a prayer of Judaism.

Kol Nidre may also refer to:

- Kol Nidrei (Bruch), a piece of classical music for cello and orchestra by Max Bruch
- Kol Nidre, a work of classical music for chorus and orchestra by Arnold Schoenberg
- Kol Nidre (album), a rock music album by The Electric Prunes
