= Aces Back to Back =

Aces Back to Back may refer to:

- Aces Back to Back (CD/DVD), a CD/DVD set compiled in 2004 from Bobby Darin recordings
- Aces Back to Back (book), a history of the Grateful Dead written by Scott W. Allen, first published in 1992 by Outskirts Press
- Aces Back to Back (jazz compilation), a set of four compact discs released in 1998 by label 32 Jazz, featuring Rahsaan Roland Kirk
- "Aces Back to Back", an episode of the TV series Mr. Lucky that aired January 2, 1960
