= Mass in F Minor =

Studio album by The Electric Prunes
- Released: January 1968
- Recorded: December 1967
- Genres: Psychedelic rock, progressive rock
- Length: 26:26
- Label: Reprise
- Producer: David Hassinger

The Electric Prunes chronology
Underground (1967)	Mass in F Minor (1968)	Release of an Oath (1968)

Singles from Mass in F Minor
- 1. "Sanctus" Released: 1968

Professional ratings
Review scores
Source	Rating
Allmusic	2.5/5 stars
Rolling Stone	Negative
Encyclopedia of Popular Music	3/5 stars

Mass in F Minor is the third studio album by American rock band The Electric Prunes, released in 1968. It consists of a musical setting of the mass sung in Latin and Greek and arranged in the psychedelic style of the band, and was written and arranged by David Axelrod.

== Background and recording ==
Following the limited commercial success of the Electric Prunes' previous album, Underground, the band's manager Lenny Poncher and their producer Dave Hassinger, whose company owned the rights to the band name, agreed with Reprise Records that their third album would be written and arranged by David Axelrod, a classically trained musician. The album was planned to combine religious and classical elements with psychedelic rock, in a religious-based rock-opera concept album. Axelrod was given carte blanche by Hassinger to do what he wanted with the Electric Prunes.

When the existing band – singer James Lowe, guitarists Ken Williams and Mike Gannon, bassist Mark Tulin, and drummer Michael "Quint" Weakley – came to record the album, it became apparent that the complex arrangements largely outstripped the band's ability to perform them to the standards expected by Axelrod, or within the time set aside for recording. Although Lowe, Tulin (the only band member who could read music) and Weakley appeared on all the tracks, and Williams and Gannon also appeared on the first three tracks ("Kyrie Eleison", "Gloria" and "Credo"), the album was finished by studio musicians working with engineer Richie Podolor on guitar, and a Canadian group, the Collectors. The choral-style vocals were by Lowe, double-tracked. Hassinger was credited with producing the album.

== Release and performance ==
Mass in F Minor was released in January 1968 and reached number 135 on the Billboard Top LPs chart. Photos of the band appeared on the back of the record sleeve, though with the band's previous guitarist James 'Weasel' Spagnola shown, rather than Gannon. The Electric Prunes performed the album's songs in concert twice. At the recently finished Robert Frost Auditorium in Culver City, after a well received set featuring songs from their first two albums, the band announced that the remainder of the performance would be songs from their just released album, Mass in F Minor. The audience, nearly all from adjacent Culver City High and Junior High schools, were not expecting church music. Not long into the first number, boos and taunts were overpowering the band's music, followed by much of the young audience heading for the exits. The Electric Prunes attempted a second number, but called it quits rather than play to an almost empty venue.

At the Santa Monica Civic Auditorium, which Tulin described:

From the outset the performance was a disaster. We missed the intro on the first song and it never got any better. Amp speakers blew, charts fell off music stands and everyone was, in general, in a complete state of confusion. Ended up each song turned into one long jam. I think we were, at times, all in the same key. I made my way over to the four celli and four French horns and told them to 'jam in E.' Somehow we would hit a break and James would manage a vocal. Mercifully, this all ended and as we were leaving a few 'fans' said, 'We didn't know you guys were into avant-garde jazz.'

An eerie version of the opening track, "Kyrie Eleison", became somewhat of an underground favorite when it appeared in the soundtrack for the counterculture film, Easy Rider.

Some later reissues of Mass in F Minor incorrectly credited a later incarnation of the band with recording the album. The Electric Prunes were credited with a further album arranged by David Axelrod, Release of an Oath, arranged in a similar style to Mass in F Minor, but by that time the original band had dissolved.

== Track listing ==
All songs composed by David Axelrod except where noted.

1. "Kyrie Eleison" – 3:21
2. "Gloria" – 5:45
3. "Credo" – 5:02
4. "Sanctus" – 2:57
5. "Benedictus" – 4:52
6. "Agnus Dei" – 4:29

=== CD bonus tracks ===
1. "Hey Mr. President" (Ritchie Adams, Mark Barkan) – 2:49
2. "Flowing Smoothly" (Brett Wade) – 3:04

== Personnel ==
- James Lowe – vocals
- Ken Williams – lead guitar (some tracks)
- Mike Gannon – rhythm guitar (some tracks)
- Mark Tulin – bass
- Michael "Quint" Weakley – drums
- Richie Podolor – guitar (some tracks)
- The Collectors – (some tracks)
