= Sweetwater (album) =

Studio album by Sweetwater
- Released: 20 December 1968
- Recorded: The Sound Factory, Hollywood, California 1968
- Genre: Psychedelic folk; jazz fusion; folk rock
- Length: 36:06
- Label: Reprise
- Producer: Dave Hassinger

Sweetwater chronology
Sweetwater (1968)	Just for You (1970)

Singles from Sweetwater
- 1. "What's Wrong" / "My Crystal Spider" Released: 1968; 2. "Motherless Child" / "Why Oh Why" Released: 1969; 3. "For Pete's Sake" / "Rondeau" Released: 1969

Sweetwater is the debut studio album by the Los Angeles band, Sweetwater. The album is musically enriched by several influences from different genres that the band sought to experiment with. Much of the band's resemblance came from Jefferson Airplane, the group that successfully integrated jazz fusion into their compositions. Upon the album's release, it was largely unnoticed, but still became the band's only work to chart in the Billboard 200. Their most acclaimed track is the opening cover version of "Motherless Child".

== Background ==
Sweetwater was composed of eight individuals of different ethnicities, all of whom had common beginnings on the coffeehouse circuit in Los Angeles. With psychedelic music at the height of its popularity in 1968, Reprise Records decided to sign the band to their label to capitalize on it. The band was not just limited to the psychedelic scene though, as Sweetwater immersed itself in multiple musical genres ranging from folk rock, latin rock, and classical music. Reprise knowingly produced for the band, despite the fact their sound was not marketable to the general public.

Recording commenced at the Sound Factory in Hollywood, California with producer Dave Hassinger, notable for producing other musical groups like The Electric Prunes. The tracks included original material along with covers of traditional pieces. The band was highly versatile as it possessed musicians who played a wide variety of exotic instruments, including congas, percussion, and bongos. The congas, in particular, were a peculiar aspect of the group at the time since other bands, most notably Santana, had not yet come to prominence with their incorporation of the instrument in rock music. Another interesting aspect regarding recordings was the total lack of electric guitar, an instrument Sweetwater disregarded the use of, even in live performances. Arrangements of the instrumentals were conducted by Alex del Zoppo and Frank Herrera, and, in all aspects, the two utlilized the capabilities of their bandmates as they were involved in the process of each track. For that reason, there was complexity in all aspects of their compositions, from the hallucinogenic tunes such as "My Crystal Spider", and more traditional arrangements like their rendition of the Negro spiritual "Motherless Child". Nansi Nevins was the lead vocalist on nearly every track; however, Sweetwater is the only album that the singer was involved in throughout the whole process. This was a consequence of an automobile accident in which Nevins suffered severe injuries to her brain and vocal cords.

Sweetwater was released in 1968 with the catalog number RS #6313, just getting into the national charts at number 200 where it would stay for two weeks. With the album, two singles, "Motherless Child" backed with "Why Oh Why" and "My Crystal Spider" b/w "What's Wrong" preceded it, both of which failed to chart. Still, "Motherless Child" became popular in Los Angeles when it was constantly played on FM radio. The band's take on the traditional blues song became a favorite associated with group. The cover features the group in their usual live attire, and their primary instruments in hand. Despite the limited success of their debut effort, Sweetwater, in 1969, would partake in the proceedings at the Woodstock Festival, and became remembered as the first band to perform (and second act overall).

== Track listing ==
No.	Title	Writer(s)	Length
1.	"Motherless Child"	Traditional, adapted and arranged by Fred Herrera and Nansi Nevins	5:04
2.	"Here We Go Again"	Nevins	2:32
3.	"For Pete's Sake"	Alex Del Zoppo	2:50
4.	"Come Take a Walk"	Nevins	3:48
5.	"What's Wrong"	Herrera	4:00
6.	"In a Rainbow"	Del Zoppo	3:17
7.	"My Crystal Spider"	Herrera	3:52
8.	"Rondeau"	Herrera	1:15
9.	"Two Worlds"	Nevins	3:56
10.	"Through an Old Storybook"	Herrera	2:32
11.	"Why Oh Why"	Albert Moore	3:00

== Personnel ==
- Nansi Nevins - lead vocals
- Fred Herrera - bass guitar, vocals
- August Burns - cello
- Elpidio Cobian - congas, percussion
- Alan Malarowitz - drums
- Albert Moore - flute, vocals
- R.G. Carlyle - acoustic guitar, bongos, vocals
- Alex Del Zoppo - keyboards, vocals
