= About a Quarter to Nine =

Song
- Language: English
- Published: 1935
- Composer(s): Harry Warren
- Lyricist(s): Al Dubin

"About a Quarter to Nine" is a popular song written by Al Dubin and Harry Warren and published in 1935 by M. Witmark & Son, New York.

== Background ==
Dubin and Warren wrote the song for the 1935 musical Go into Your Dance. The song is introduced by Al Jolson. This and "She's a Latin from Manhattan" were the most notable from the movie.

In the 1946 film of Jolson's life, The Jolson Story, the song featured. Jolson recorded it commercially on June 18, 1947, for Decca Records.

== Later cover versions ==
Among the musicians who successfully covered the song in the US in 1935 were Johnny Green and his Orchestra (with Jimmy Farrell on vocals), Columbia 3029), Victor Young and His Orchestra (vocal by Hal Burke), and Ozzie Nelson (1935, Brunswick). Later versions were recorded by J. Lawrence Cook, Wingy Manone, Claude Hopkins, and Ambassador Ambrose. A version by Bobby Darin was included in the CD Aces Back to Back (2004).

The Electric Prunes covered the song on their 1967 album The Electric Prunes.

In 1980 the song was used in the musical 42nd Street. In 1982 the song was covered by Peter Skellern on his album A String of Pearls, which made No. 67 in the UK Albums Chart.

In 2015 discographer Tom Lord listed a total of 21 cover versions, in the area of jazz, including Mavis Rivers / Nelson Riddle (1959), Red Norvo (1962, with Mavis Rivers and Ella Mae Morse), Rod Levitt (RCA, 1966), Susannah McCorkle (on The Music of Harry Warren, 1976) and Dave McKenna (Concord, 1981).
