= Blind Man on a Flying Horse =

Studio album by Lick the Tins
- Released: 1986 (re-released 1991)
- Recorded: 1986
- Genre: Celtic, folk rock, indie
- Label: Sedition Records

Blind Man on a Flying Horse is the only album by Lick the Tins. It was released in 1986 with 12 tracks. It resulted in three singles, "Can't Help Falling in Love", "The Belle of Belfast City" and "In the Middle of the Night". Lick the Tins' version of "Can't Help Falling in Love" was also used in the ending credits of two films: Some Kind of Wonderful in 1987 and The Snapper in 1993.

It received good reviews, especially in the Folk Roots music magazine, where it was chosen as "Album of the Month", but the album was not a commercial success.

== Track listing ==
1. Can't Help Falling in Love (3:25)
2. In the Middle of the Night (3:57)
3. Light Years Away (3:08)
4. Every Little Detail (3:50)
5. Hey Joe (2:28)
6. Get Me to the World on Time (3:16)
7. Ghost Story (3:22)
8. Lights Out (3:34)
9. Only a Year (3:41)
10. Here Comes Kali (4:11)
11. Road to California (1:33)
12. Belle of Belfast City (3:09)

== 1991 re-release ==
The album was rereleased in 1991 with the original 12 tracks as above in addition to six bonus tracks:

- 13. Bad Dreams (4:08)
- 14. Looks Like You (2:08)
- 15. Calliope House (3:10)
- 16. Can't Help Falling in Love (12") (5:58)
- 17. In the Middle of the Night (12") (6:06)
- 18. Belle of Belfast City (12") (4:48)

== 2007 re-release ==
The album was rereleased a second time in 2007 under the label Talking Elephant. It contains the 18 tracks found on the 1991 rerelease.

== Singles ==
- "Can't Help Falling in Love"
  - "Bad Dreams" (B-side)
- "Belle of Belfast City"
  - "Calliope House" (B-side)
- "In the Middle of the Night"
  - "It Looks Like You" (B-side)
  - "Road to California" (only on the 12" release)
