= I Had Too Much to Dream (Last Night) =

Single by the Electric Prunes

from the album The Electric Prunes
- B-side: "Luvin'"
- Released: November 1966
- Recorded: 1966, Los Angeles
- Genre: Psychedelic rock; garage rock; proto-punk
- Length: 2:55
- Label: Reprise
- Composer: Annette Tucker
- Lyricist: Nancie Mantz
- Producer: Dave Hassinger

The Electric Prunes singles chronology
| "Ain't It Hard" (1966) | "I Had Too Much to Dream (Last Night)" (1966) | "Get Me to the World on Time" (1967) |

"I Had Too Much to Dream (Last Night)" is a song written by Annette Tucker and Nancie Mantz which was recorded in late 1966 by the American garage rock band the Electric Prunes. Released as the band's second single in November of that year, it reached number 49 in the UK and peaked at number 11 on the Billboard Hot 100 the week ending February 11, 1967. It was also the lead track of the band's 1967 debut album, and became more widely known as the opening track on the 1972 Nuggets compilation of 1960s garage rock and psychedelic rock.

The song's title is a play on the phrase "too much [alcohol] to drink": its lyrics describe how the singer has woken from dreaming about an ex-lover.

== Origins of the song ==
The Electric Prunes originally formed as the Sanctions at Taft High School in Los Angeles. They were introduced to record producer Dave Hassinger, and after a series of rehearsals at Leon Russell's house released the single "Ain't It Hard". Despite this single's commercial failure, Reprise Records agreed that the band could record a second.

Convinced that the band could not write their own songs, Hassinger sought material from the songwriting team of Annette Tucker and Nancie Mantz, including "I Had Too Much to Dream (Last Night)". According to some sources, the song was originally conceived as an orchestral piano ballad; however, according to Tucker, "I came up with the title one day and called Nancie. She loved it and we wrote it the next day in one half hour...The words were there and my melody came easily. I was influenced by the Rolling Stones at the time and that is how I heard that song being recorded...Nancie and I envisioned this as a rock song." A demo version recorded for Hassinger by singer-songwriter Jerry Fuller (in some sources wrongly identified as Jerry Vale), may have been the source of the story of the song's origin as a ballad.

At the time, the Electric Prunes consisted of singer James Lowe, guitarists Ken Williams and James "Weasel" Spagnola, bassist Mark Tulin, and drummer Preston Ritter. The backwards guitar which opens the song originated from rehearsals at Russell's house, where Williams used a 1958 Gibson Les Paul with a Bigsby vibrato tailpiece. According to Lowe: "We were recording on a four-track, and just flipping the tape over and re-recording when we got to the end. Dave cued up a tape and didn't hit 'record,' and the playback in the studio was way up: ear-shattering vibrating jet guitar. Ken had been shaking his Bigsby wiggle stick with some fuzztone and tremolo at the end of the tape. Forward it was cool. Backward it was amazing. I ran into the control room and said, 'What was that?' They didn't have the monitors on so they hadn't heard it. I made Dave cut it off and save it for later."

The song was released as a single in November 1966. At first it was caught up in the Christmas rush, but in early 1967 it made steady progress up the Billboard charts, peaking at number 11. It also reached number 49 on the UK singles chart. Its success enabled the band to tour, and they later released a self-titled album and the successful follow-up single "Get Me to the World on Time".

== Chart performance ==
| Chart (1966–1967) | Peak position |
|---|---|
| UK Singles (The Official Charts Company) | 49 |
| US Billboard Hot 100 | 11 |
| Canada RPM | 13 |

== Other recordings ==
The song has also been recorded by other artists including:

- Deviled Ham
- Todd Tamanend Clark
- Wayne County & the Electric Chairs
- Stiv Bators
- The Damned
- The Vibrators
- Doro Pesch
- Paul Roland, Ulver
- Webb Wilder
- Opal Butterfly
- An Italian-language version, "Sospesa Ad Un Filo", was recorded in 1967 by I Corvi.

== Personnel ==
- James Lowe – lead vocals, autoharp, rhythm guitar, tambourine
- Ken Williams – lead guitar
- James "Weasel" Spagnola – rhythm guitar, backing vocals
- Mark Tulin – bass guitar, piano, organ
- Preston Ritter – drums, percussion
