= Sham Rock =

Band from Northern Ireland

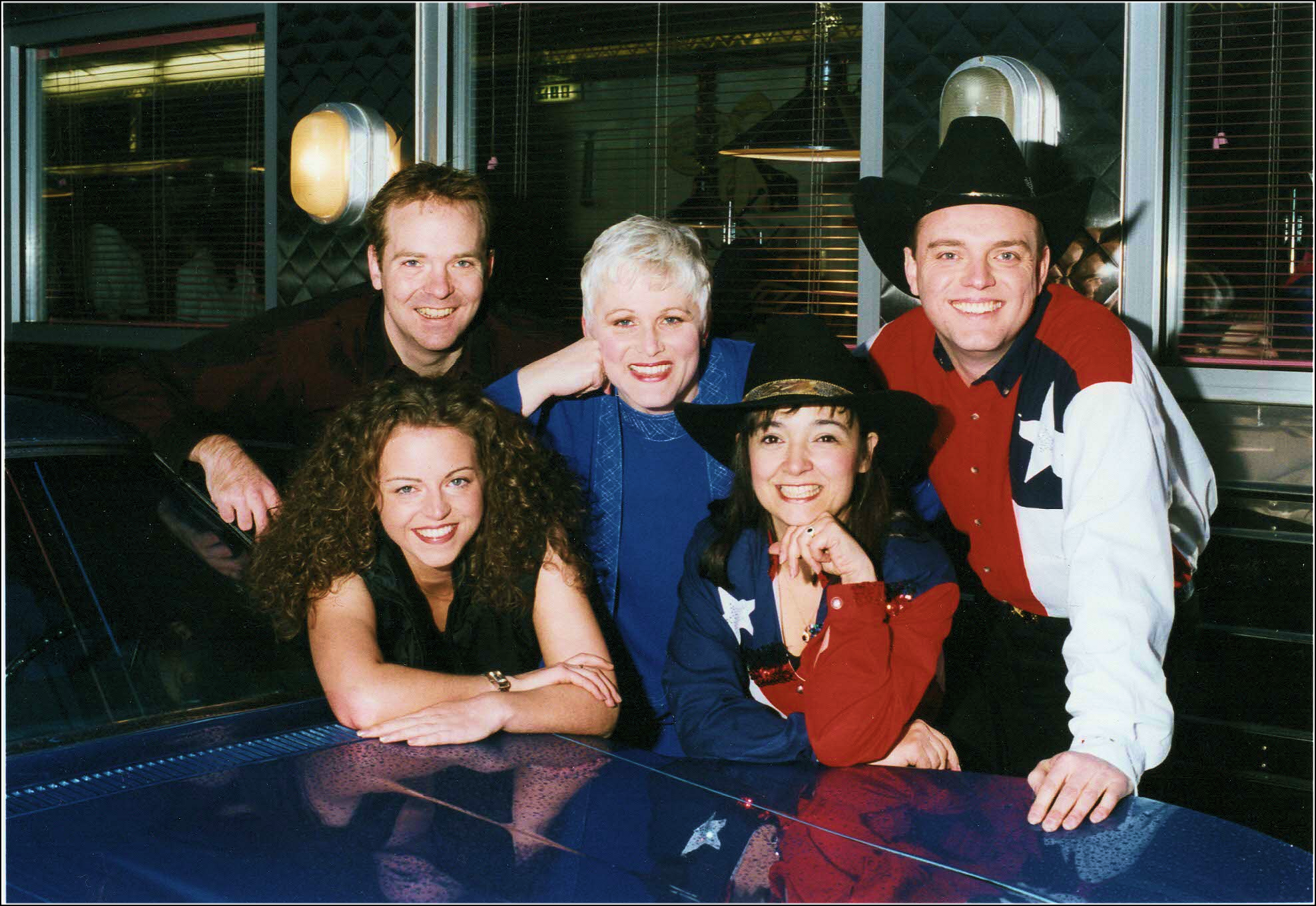
- Sham Rock in 1998

Background information
- Origin: Belfast, Northern Ireland, United Kingdom
- Genres: Pop, dance, folk
- Label: Jive Records
- Members: Anne Barrett; John Hamilton; Philip Larsen
- Past members: Graham Scales; Jacqueline Scales

Sham Rock are a British pseudo-folk band from Belfast, Northern Ireland, known solely for their 1998 single, "Tell Me Ma" (a pop version of 19th century children's song "I'll Tell Me Ma"). "Tell Me Ma" peaked at number 13 on the UK Singles Chart and remained on the charts for 13 weeks. It sold over 200,000 copies in the United Kingdom and Ireland, certifying the track as a Silver single in April 2025 for 200,000 sales equivalent streams and pure sales combined.

A one-hit wonder, Sham Rock had no other chart entries.

== Discography ==
- Sham Rock: The Album (2003)
