= I'll Tell Me Ma =

Traditional children's song

- Folk song
- Key: G major
- Catalogue: Roud Folk Song Index 2649
- Genre: Irish traditional music
- Language: English
- Time: 2/4

"I'll Tell Me Ma" (Irish version)
Performed by Celtic Aire of the United States Air Force Band

"I'll Tell Me Ma" (also called "The Wind") is a traditional children's song. It was collected in various parts of the United Kingdom in the 19th century and again appears in collections from shortly after the turn of the 20th century. In Ireland, especially within Ulster, the chorus usually refers to Belfast city and is known colloquially as "The Belle of Belfast City", although it is also adapted to other Irish cities, such as Dublin. Other versions refer to the "Golden City" or "London City". This song is Roud Folk Song Index number 2649.

The song accompanies a children's game. A ring is formed by the children joining hands, one player standing in the centre. When asked, "Please tell me who they be," the girl in the middle gives the name or initials of a boy in the ring (or vice versa). The ring then sings the rest of the words, and the boy who was named goes into the centre.

== Opening verse and chorus ==
I'll tell me ma, when I get home
The boys won't leave the girls alone
Pulled me hair, and stole my comb
But that's alright, till I go home.

Chorus:
She is handsome, she is pretty
She is the belle of Belfast city
She is a-courting one, two, three
Pray, can you tell me who is she?

== Recordings and renditions ==
"I'll Tell Me Ma"

Single by Van Morrison and The Chieftains

from the album Irish Heartbeat
- B-side: "Tá Mo Chleamhnas Déanta"
- Released: 1988
- Recorded: December 1987–January 1988
- Genre: Folk
- Length: 2:29
- Label: Mercury
- Songwriter: unknown
- Producers: Van Morrison, Paddy Moloney

Van Morrison and The Chieftains singles chronology
"Queen of the Slipstream" (1988)	"I'll Tell Me Ma" (1988)	"Have I Told You Lately" (1989)

The song has been covered on numerous albums, some of which have adapted the lyrics to their locales.

One of the more notable renditions was by Van Morrison and The Chieftains, for their collaboration record Irish Heartbeat in 1988; the album reached number 18 on the UK Albums Chart. The song was guest-sung by Ronnie Drew of The Dubliners on The Chieftains album Live From Dublin: A Tribute To Derek Bell in 2005. The Chieftains also played the song with Cartoon Network character Brak for the latter's variety show special, Brak Presents the Brak Show Starring Brak and related album in 2000.

Sham Rock released a popular rendition of the song set to a dance beat titled "Tell Me Ma" in 1998. The single reached number 13 on the UK Singles Chart, remained on the charts for 17 weeks, and sold over 200,000 copies. It has been included on various compilation albums that have sold a total of over 3 million copies.

Other notable recordings include:

- The Clancy Brothers and Tommy Makem, as "I'll Tell My Ma" on The Boys Won't Leave The Girls Alone, 1962. The album title is a lyric from the song.
- The Corries, as part of "The Singing Games" on The Corrie Folk Trio and Paddie Bell, 1964. The song uses the lyric "She's the girl of the windy city"
- The Dubliners as "I'll Tell My Ma" on their debut album The Dubliners with Luke Kelly, 1964.
- Lick the Tins, as "The Belle of Belfast City (Roud 2649)", on Blind Man on a Flying Horse, 1986. It was first released as a single.
- The Rankin Family as "Tell My Ma", on their second album Fare Thee Well Love, 1990, and on their re-released album North Country, 1993.
- Four to the Bar, on their live album Craic on the Road, 1994.
- Orthodox Celts, on The Celts Strike Again, 1997 - This version uses the lyric "She's the belle of Belgrade City" in reference to their home town.
- The Wiggles did a rendition of this called "Nya, Nya, Nya" which is found on the video Wiggledance!, and album The Wiggles Movie Soundtrack, both released in 1997. They would later sing "I'll Tell Me Ma" on the album, Apples & Bananas, 2014.
- Gaelic Storm as "Tell Me Ma" on their debut album Gaelic Storm, 1998.
- Belfast Food, on Za to Zato, 1999.
- The Tossers as "Maidrin Rua / Tell Me Ma" on Communication & Conviction: Last Seven Years, 2001. This version uses the lyric "She is the belle of Dublin city".
- Sinéad O'Connor, on Sean-Nós Nua, 2002
- The Poxy Boggards as "Tell Me Ma", on Whiskey Business, 2006.
- The Young Dubliners, on With All Due Respect - The Irish Sessions, 2007 This version uses the lyric "She is the belle of Dublin city".
- Beatnik Turtle as "Tell Me Ma", on Sham Rock, 2008.
- Christy Moore, on an extended version of his song "Lisdoonvarna", sings a verse of "I'll Tell Me Ma", on Live at Vicar Street, 2002
- The Irish Tenors, on Ellis Island, 2001
- Orla Fallon, Live With The Dubliners And Damien Dempsey, on My Land, 2011.
- The Rumjacks, on "Hung, Drawn & Portered", 2009
- Irish punk band The Undertones reference this song in their song "Top Twenty", a B-side of "Here Comes the Summer" by lifting the line "The boys won't leave the girls alone."
- Celtic Thunder recorded a short version on their "Voyage" album, which included two other traditional Irish folk tunes. (The other two being "Courtin' in the Kitchen" and "The Irish rover".) The Medley was given the title of "The Clancy Bros. Medley".
- As "The Golden City" the song features three times in The Singing Street, a film of children's songs featuring Edinburgh school pupils, made in 1950.
- In the 1994 movie, "Sirens", the song is sung at 55:28 by Tziporah Malkah, Elle Macpherson and Portia de Rossi but the lyric is changed to "She is the belle of Brisbane city".
- The Barndance Boys song "Yippie-i-oh" uses the same melody.

=== Parodies ===
- Marc Gunn did a parody called "I'll Tell My Cat" on Irish Drinking Songs for Cat Lovers, 2005
- The tune of I'll Tell Me Ma was interpolated by Barndance Boys for their 2003 song Yippie-I-Oh.
- Czech celtic folk group Jauvajs parodied the tune as "Hnojní" on their 2021 album "Čas se nehýbá".
