= Opal Butterfly =

British rock band

- Also known as: The Cardboard Heaven
- Origin: Oxfordshire, England
- Genres: Psychedelic rock; blues rock
- Years active: 1968–1970
- Labels: CBS; Polydor

Opal Butterfly was an English psychedelic rock group from Oxfordshire, which was active between 1968 and 1970. Although the band itself did not gain widespread success, the musicians did go on to conduct successful musical careers. The band included Simon King (drums) and, for a short time, Lemmy, who later joined Hawkwind. Further members were Robert "Robbie" Milne (lead guitar), Allan Love (lead vocals), Richard Bardey (bass guitar) and Tommy Doherty (rhythm guitar). The band released three official singles in the heavy psychedelic rock style before disbanding.

== History ==
Before becoming Opal Butterfly, the group was known as Cardboard Heaven. It was formed in 1967 in Oxfordshire. The original line-up consisted of Roger Warner (bass guitar) Robbie Milne (lead guitar), 17-year-old Simon King (drums), Alan Cobb (keyboards) with vocals shared by Stuart Thornhill and Denny Sutcliffe. Locally, the band performed at clubs and dance halls with a repertoire of R&B and blues standards. Even though the group attracted a considerable following disbanded in 1968..

=== Opal Butterfly ===
Later that year King formed Opal Butterfly and recruited Milne on guitar. The remaining line-up were associates of the two and included Allan Love (vocals) Richard Bardey (bass guitar) and Tom Doherty (guitar), Regarding the name, Doherty said, "Butterfly by itself was a bit dull, so we thought of something a bit more colourful".

The group began recording demos and received the interest of CBS Records. These included cover versions of "I Had Too Much to Dream (Last Night)" and "Wind Up Toys", both tracks by The Electric Prunes.

In 1968, the band released its first official recording, "Beautiful Beige"/"Speak Up", which was described as a solid piece of harmonial psychedelic pop, but made no impactful gains. The group's most notable recordings came in 1969 with an organ-backed cover version/remake of The Who composition "Mary Anne With The Shaky Hand" with the B-side being "My Gration Or?". Despite radio play, the single only gained them local support and the band revamped its line-up and changed labels to Polydor. Most notably, the band acquired Lemmy Kilmister, who met the band at a shop called The Chelsea Drug Store in the King's Road, Chelsea. He started a friendship with King who then asked him to join, which lasted until the group's decision to kick him a few months later. With the new label, the new line-up released a single, "Groupie Girl"/"The Gigging Song". For this final effort, the band returned to its roots as the songs were more blues influenced in nature. However, the single caused a slight uproar when the cover showed a nude woman and radio stations refused to play it. Throughout 1969 and into 1970, the band had a tour in Britain for sets of 90 minutes. The band featured in the Derek Ford film, Groupie Girl (1970), as Sweaty Betty. Lemmy did not contribute to any recordings or the film. One last line-up change did not affect the band's fortunes and it broke up in 1970. Kilmister and King co-operated once again in Hawkwind.

Milne formed another Opal Butterfly line-up with replacement musicians (namely Ray Owen (Juicy Lucy) (vocals) David O'List (Nice) (guitar), Stan Decker (Grail) (bass guitar) and Mike Burchett (drums) but this only lasted a short while. Meanwhile Doherty and King formed their own version of Opal Butterfly and were not too pleased with Milne forming his own version, so in 1969 Milne joined the New Look Soul Band which later morphed into Fine China, featuring a young 17 year old Michael Barrymore on keyboards. They garnered notable interest around London and played at some of the most eminent soul clubs in the capital, and went on to tour Europe with equal success, and before returning to England secured a three week residency at the K52 club in Frankfurt but called it a day on their return to England when work ground to halt.

Milne has tried recently to reform "Opal Butterfly" but with little success, as the music scene today has changed and they would have to be a covers band these days in order to stand a chance of securing any pub gigs or festivals.

== Discography ==
- 1966 - "I Had Too Much to Dream (Last Night)" (Mantz, Tucker) b/w "Wind-Up Toys" (demo)
- 1968 - "Beautiful Beige" b/w "Speak Up" (CBS single)
- 1968 - "Mary Anne with the Shaky Hand" (Townshend) b/w "My Gration Or?" (single)
- 1969 - "Groupie Girl" b/w "The Gigging Song" (Polydor single)
- 1970 - Groupie Girl (soundtrack album, featured the two single tracks) Polydor 2383 031
