= James Lowe (musician) =

American musician and record producer (1943–2025)

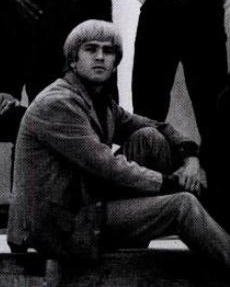
- Lowe in 1966

Background information
- Born: Thaddeus James Lowe; March 5, 1943; San Luis Obispo, California, U.S.
- Died: May 22, 2025 (aged 82) Santa Barbara, California, U.S.
- Genres: Psychedelic rock
- Occupations: Singer; musician; recording engineer; record producer; television producer
- Instruments: Guitar; autoharp
- Formerly of: The Electric Prunes

Thaddeus James Lowe (March 5, 1943 – May 22, 2025) was an American musician and record producer, best known as the lead singer of 1960s psychedelic rock band The Electric Prunes and as an audio engineer and producer with Todd Rundgren and the band Sparks.

Lowe, who for many years had left his days as a touring and recording musician behind following his departure from the Prunes in 1968, reformed the group in 1999 with original bass player and songwriting partner Mark Tulin, and after Tulin's death in 2011 was the only original member in the new version of the band.

== Early years ==
Lowe was born on March 5, 1943 in San Luis Obispo, California, and grew up in West Los Angeles. He spent time as a teenager living in Hawaii and began playing Hawaiian music, before returning to California. There, he performed in a folk duo, married in 1963, and worked at Rocketdyne, a rocket engine production company in Los Angeles, while performing after work.

== The Electric Prunes ==
Lowe was influenced by the bands of the "British Invasion" and surf music pioneer Dick Dale, and formed a garage band, the Sanctions, in 1965, by recruiting Mark Tulin (bass, keyboards), Ken Williams (lead guitar), Michael "Quint" Weakley (drums), and various other short-term members. The group developed into Jim and the Lords, and then became the Electric Prunes – a name that Lowe originally suggested as a joke, before saying: "It's not attractive, and there's nothing sexy about it, but people won't forget it."

The Electric Prunes signed to Reprise Records in 1966. Lowe was the lead singer, and played rhythm guitar and autoharp. They had two nationally charting songs, "I Had Too Much to Dream (Last Night)" and "Get Me to the World on Time", both written by external writers and included on their debut album. The original line-up toured widely, including in Europe, and recorded a second album, Underground. This contained the single "The Great Banana Hoax" written by Lowe and Tulin, and the band then began recording a third album, Mass in F Minor, written and arranged by David Axelrod. Lowe sang on the latter recording, but the complexity of the arrangements made it difficult for the band to perform, and they split up in 1968, though their manager retained the rights to use the band name in later projects.

For decades onwards, Lowe refused to comment on his earlier musical career. However, with renewed interest in the Electric Prunes' recordings in the 1990s, Lowe reconnected with Tulin, Williams and Weakley. The re-formed band toured and recorded new material, mostly written by Lowe and Tulin, both before and after Tulin's death in 2011. Lowe continued to tour occasionally with new members, as the Electric Prunes.

== Producing ==
Lowe started working as a recording engineer in Los Angeles, with producer Bill Traut. He worked closely with Todd Rundgren on the first album by Rundgren's band Nazz, and was then credited as engineer on the band's subsequent albums, Nazz Nazz and Nazz III. In 1971, Lowe continued to work with Rundgren in recording the self-titled debut album by the band Halfnelson, later known as Sparks. Credited under his full name of Thaddeus James Lowe, he produced the band's second album, A Woofer in Tweeter's Clothing. He also worked with Terry Melcher and the British band Grapefruit, among others.

He was interviewed for Edgar Wright's 2021 documentary The Sparks Brothers about engineering and producing for Sparks, and his decision to leave the business.

== Later works ==
After the commercial failure of the Sparks album, Lowe left record production in the early 1970s. He set up a television production company, and produced and directed commercials, children's shows for Disney, and corporate presentations.

== Personal life and death ==
Lowe was a descendant of aeronautics pioneer Thaddeus S. C. Lowe, from whom James' first name derives.

Lowe died at the age of 82 on May 22, 2025, at a hospital in Santa Barbara, California, due to cardiac arrest.
