= Sparks (Sparks album) =

Studio album by Sparks
- Released: January 1972 (as Halfnelson) July 1972 (as Sparks)
- Recorded: 1971
- Genre: Art pop; avant-rock
- Length: 40:23
- Label: Bearsville
- Producer: Todd Rundgren

Sparks chronology
Sparks (1972)	A Woofer in Tweeter's Clothing (1973)

Alternative cover
- Halfnelson release

Singles from Halfnelson/Sparks
- 1. "Wonder Girl" Released: May 1972

Professional ratings
Review scores
Source	Rating
Allmusic	3.5/5 stars

Sparks, originally titled Halfnelson, is the debut studio album by the Los Angeles rock band Sparks. The album was first released as Halfnelson, the band's original name, in January 1972 on Bearsville Records and was produced by Todd Rundgren. Upon rebranding as Sparks, the album was reissued later that year under the group’s new name.

== Recording ==
At this point in their career, Halfnelson was a three piece group comprising the Mael brothers and guitarist Earle Mankey. The demos that the trio had recorded in Mankey's home studio came to the attention of musician and producer Todd Rundgren, who signed them to the Bearsville label and produced their debut album in 1971. Interviewed in 2013, the duo recalled their collaboration with Rundgren as a very positive experience.

Ron Mael: "It was intimidating for us just to be in a studio, but he was really incredibly open to what we were doing, and I think we really felt like kindred spirits, even though some of his own music was kinda maybe more soul-based. But he was an Anglophile just the way we were Anglophiles. It all went incredibly well with him personally and musically."

Russell Mael: "To his credit, he didn't wanna change what we were doing, he just wanted the fidelity to be a little better. So we were going into an expensive recording studio with Todd, but still banging on cardboard boxes and all. He could see that the recording process was kind of a part of what we were. It wasn't that we needed to be changed into a traditional band. The way we were recording was a fair part of what we were and what made us interesting as a band to him.”

"Wonder Girl", the band's first single, exemplified both the Maels' unorthodox approach, and Rundgren's openness to it:

Russell Mael: "Todd really wanted to preserve the quality of the demo. It's not like a live band sound at all. The guitar parts are really deliberate. The recording has a real character to it.”

Ron Mael: "The keyboard on that was the Wurlitzer. It was always difficult for me to figure out how a keyboard really worked with a band. So in that particular song, it was kind of a two-note riff.”

== Release ==
Halfnelson was initially released on Bearsville Records in early 1972. Shortly after the release of the album, the group changed their name to Sparks. The album was then re-released by Bearsville Records later the same year as Sparks. The new version of the album featured new artwork that was simpler, displaying the group in more of a classic pose superimposed against a red brick pattern. The single to this reissue "Wonder Girl", became a minor regional hit in certain parts of Alabama and California and also appeared on the lower end of the Cashbox chart at #92. The single also Bubbled Under the Hot 100 at No. 112. The tracks "Roger" and "Saccharin and the War" are re-recorded versions of songs from their untitled 1969 demo album, which is erroneously referred to as "The 'A Woofer in Tweeter's Clothing' Demos".

== Re-issue ==
Sparks has been re-released numerous times since 1972. It is often packaged with the follow-up album A Woofer in Tweeter's Clothing. One such re-issue was released in 1975 to capitalize on the group's success in the UK. This version was titled 2 Originals of Sparks and was packaged as a double-LP in a gatefold sleeve with a 14-page booklet.

The most recent CD re-issue was released in 2019 on the Dutch record label Music On CD.

== Track listing ==
Side one
No.	Title	Writer(s)	Length
1.	"Wonder Girl"	Ron Mael	2:21
2.	"Fa La Fa Lee"	Ron Mael	2:53
3.	"Roger"	Russell Mael	2:37
4.	"High C"	Ron Mael	3:13
5.	"Fletcher Honorama"	Ron Mael	4:15
6.	"Simple Ballet"	Russell Mael, Ron Mael	3:53

Side two
No.	Title	Writer(s)	Length
7.	"Slowboat"	Russell Mael, Ron Mael	3:54
8.	"Biology 2"	Earle Mankey	3:10
9.	"Saccharin and the War"	Russell Mael	4:02
10.	"Big Bands"	Ron Mael, Russell Mael	4:16
11.	"(No More) Mr. Nice Guys"	Jim Mankey, Ron Mael	5:49
Total length:			40:23

== Personnel ==
Halfnelson/Sparks

- Russell Mael - vocals
- Ron Mael - keyboards, piano, organ
- Earle Mankey - guitar, lead vocal on "Biology 2"
- Jim Mankey - bass guitar
- Harley Feinstein - drums

Technical

- Todd Rundgren - producer
- Thaddeus James Lowe - engineer
- Ron Mael - artwork
- Larry Dupont - photography
