= I Ain't No Miracle Worker =

Single by The Brogues
- B-side: "Don't Shoot Me Down"
- Released: November 1965
- Recorded: 1965, Sunset Recorders, Los Angeles, California
- Genre: Garage rock; R&B; blues rock
- Length: 2:51
- Label: Challenge
- Songwriters: Annette Tucker, Nancie Mantz
- Producer: Clara Thompson

The Brogues singles chronology
"Somebody" (1965)	"I Ain't No Miracle Worker" (1965)

"I Ain't No Miracle Worker" is a song by the American garage rock band, the Brogues, written by Annette Tucker and Nancie Mantz, and released as the group's second and final single on Challenge Records, in November 1965 (see 1965 in music). The composition is now considered a classic of the musical genre of garage rock, and has reappeared on several compilation albums and has been covered by other musical artists. The Brogues' original rendition was musically influenced by their contemporaries on the R&B circuit and the British Invasion.

== Background ==
=== The Brogues version ===
The Brogues were hurried to record a follow-up single after the regional success of their debut, "Someday". Over the span of a few months, the group's rebellious image and dynamic stage show launched them into prominence on the West Coast. In mid-1965, the band, bolstered by their addition of ex-Ratz lead vocalist Gary Cole, entered Sunset Recorders in Los Angeles to record "I Ain't No Miracle Worker", which was penned by the songwriting duo of Annette Tucker and Nancie Mantz, coupled with "Don't Shoot Me Down". The song's lyrics are about an individual who has no pretensions about himself and confesses in the subdued chorus "I ain't no miracle worker"/"I do the best that I can". The Brogues reworked Tucker's original instrumental arrangement with a jangling Byrds-inspired rhythm section and fuzz-toned guitar melody. The buzzing distorted sound was produced by lead guitarist Eddie Rodrigues's shredded speakers in his amplifier. In addition to the striking guitar motif, the song is also marked by Cole's soulful vocal, Rick Campbell's electronic organ interjections, and Bill Whittington's heavy bass line.

"I Ain't No Miracle Worker" was released in November 1965 on the independent record label, Challenge. Upon release however, the single failed to breakout nationally as a consequence of the record company's advertising focus being directed toward The Knickerbockers' hit, "Lies". Additionally, the Brogues could not promote the single as they disbanded after two of their members were conscripted into the armed forces. Since its initial distribution, "I Ain't No Miracle Worker" is immortalized on the 1998 compact disc reissue of the compilation album Nuggets: Original Artyfacts from the First Psychedelic Era, 1965–1968 and later Trash Box. The B-side, "Don't Shoot Me Down" is featured on Pebbles, Volume 10.

=== Other versions ===
The Chocolate Watchband recorded their own version of "I Ain't No Miracle Worker" in 1968 for their second album The Inner Mystique. The group's rendition is swayed more toward psychedelia with its sitar-like guitar instrumentals played cohesively with its conventional rock arrangement. The song reaches a climax with lead vocalist David Aguilar's half-shouted chorus. In 2015, the Chocolate Watchband re-recorded the tune for the album I'm Not Like Everybody Else, along with their other better-known tracks. An Italian language versions of "I Ain't No Miracle Worker" was released by the Italian beat group I Corvi under the title "Un ragazzo di strada": it became their biggest hit and was itself covered by many artists such as Vasco Rossi and Tonino Carotone. Other versions of "I Ain't No Miracle Worker" were also released by Jimmy and the Offbeats, Gene Pierson, The Barracudas, and Scott Miller & the Commonwealth (under the name "Miracle Man") on 2001's Thus Always to Tyrants.
