= Syracuse New Times =

Defunct newspaper in Syracuse, New York

Coordinates: 43.0522°N 76.1808°W

- Type: Alternative weekly
- Format: Tabloid
- Owner: All Times Publishing LLC
- Publisher: William Brod
- Editor: Bill DeLapp
- Founded: 1969
- Ceased publication: 2019-06-26
- Headquarters: 1415 W Genesee St.; Syracuse, New York 13221; United States
- ISSN: 0893-844X
- OCLC number: 15669760
- Website: syracusenewtimes.com

Syracuse New Times was a weekly alternative newspaper published in Syracuse, New York, by William Brod and distributed throughout the Central New York region. It was owned by All Times Publishing LLC. The publication was released every Wednesday, printing 36,000 copies and distributed to approximately 1150 locations in Central New York. After an unsuccessful trial as a paid subscription-based paper, the New Times published its final issue on 26 June 2019.
