= Just Good Old Rock and Roll =

Studio album by The Electric Prunes
- Released: June 1969
- Recorded: 1969
- Studio: Sound Factory, Hollywood, California
- Genre: Psychedelic rock
- Length: 37:28
- Label: Reprise
- Producer: David Hassinger

The Electric Prunes chronology
Release of an Oath (1968)	Just Good Old Rock and Roll (1969)	Stockholm '67 (1997)

Singles from Just Good Old Rock and Roll
- 1. "Sell" Released: June 1969; 2. "Finders Keepers, Losers Weepers" Released: October 1969

Professional ratings
Review scores
Source	Rating
AllMusic	1.5/5 stars
Billboard	(positive)
Encyclopedia of Popular Music	1/5 stars

Just Good Old Rock and Roll is the fifth studio album by The Electric Prunes, released in 1969. It was recorded with a lineup put together by Wilson-Fisher management for David Hassinger, who owned the name, during a period in which the original group was disbanded. This album took the Prunes' music decidedly away from the previous experimentation and underground psychedelia into (as the title suggests) more driving rock music. While there are elements of mild psychedelia present, the group's new direction pointed towards the boogie rock that would be further developed in the 1970s by bands such as The James Gang, Cactus and Foghat.

== Background ==
Just Good Old Rock and Roll was the first Electric Prunes album almost entirely written and performed by the band members. While the record received some critical praise at the time, its sales were middling, and this would be the final Electric Prunes studio album until another lineup (with members from prior versions of the band) released Artifact decades later, in 2001.

The group toured throughout 1969 and 1970 and also released three singles. In early 1971, the Electric Prunes officially disbanded.

Guitarist Ron Morgan died in 1989, and keyboardist John Herron (who was briefly a band member during much of the album recording sessions before leaving) was killed in an automobile accident in the 1990s.

Former band members would, years later, reform the group, while none of the performers on this album would be included. None of the original band members were on this album.

In 2006, Collectors' Choice Music reissued Just Good Old Rock and Roll on CD.

== Band name ==
The album cover described the band as the new improved Electric Prunes, an in-joke prompted by a contemporary album recorded by Blue Cheer and the preponderance of 'new and improved' products flooding the consumer market, as well as referring to the new lineup. This has led to confusion with some believing the band's name had been altered; however, the group was officially just The Electric Prunes.

== Track listing ==
=== Side one ===
1. "Sell" (M. Herron, John Herron) – 3:13
2. "14 Year Old Funk" (Bill Daffern, Ron Morgan) – 3:31
3. "Love Grows" (Bill Daffern, John Fleck, Ron Morgan, Brett Wade) – 4:07
4. "So Many People to Tell" (Brett Wade) – 4:00
5. "Finders Keepers, Losers Weepers" (Jimmy Holiday, Jimmy Lewis, Cliff Chambers) – 3:30

=== Side two ===
1. "Giant Sunhorse" (Bill Daffern, Ron Morgan, Larry Tamblyn, Brett Wade) – 4:06
2. "Violent Rose" (John Herron, Dick Whetstone) – 2:42
3. "Thorjon" (Mark Kincaid, Brett Wade, Dick Whetstone) – 2:58
4. "Silver Passion Mine" (Brett Wade) – 2:53
5. "Tracks" (M. Herron, John Herron) – 2:44
6. "Sing to Me" (Brett Wade) – 3:22

== Personnel ==
=== Musicians ===
- Ron Morgan – guitar
- Mark Kincaid – guitar, backing vocals
- John Herron – organ
- Brett Wade – bass, backing vocals, flute
- Dick Whetstone – drums, lead vocals

=== Technical ===
- Dave Hassinger – producer
- Rick Heenan – engineer
- Juddy Phillips – engineer
- Ed Thrasher – art direction
- Tommy Mitchell – cover photo
