= Aces Back to Back (album) =

Compilation album by Bobby Darin
- Released: 14 September 2004
- Recorded: 1966–1973
- Genre: Pop, jazz, folk
- Length: 59:30 (CD)
- Label: Hyena Records
- Producer: Joel Dorn

Professional ratings
Review scores
Source	Rating
The Encyclopedia of Popular Music	2/5 stars

Aces Back to Back is a compact disc featuring a compilation of songs by Bobby Darin plus a DVD containing archival video of Darin. The set was compiled and released in 2004 by Hyena Records in an agreement with the Bobby Darin estate 31 years after Darin's death. According to producer Joel Dorn, "The title says it all. It’s aces back to back, all left hooks and no filler.”

The first seven of the selections were recorded live during Dean Martin Presents: The Bobby Darin Amusement Company, a 1972 television show, and The Bobby Darin Show in 1973. Two songs, "If I Were a Carpenter" and "Simple Song of Freedom", were from an unreleased live recording in 1969. Two songs were culled from Darin's Big Sur sessions.

Rounding out the compilation are Darin's "milk recordings," a collection of songs featured on a radio show sponsored by the American Dairy Association in the 1960s.

== Track listing ==
CD
No.	Title	Length
1.	"This Could Be the Start of Something Big"	2:22
2.	"Can't Take My Eyes off of You"	3:42
3.	"Song Sung Blue"	3:00
4.	"All I Have to Do Is Dream" (with Petula Clark)	2:50
5.	"A Quarter to Nine" (Al Jolson sang "About a Quarter to Nine" in the 1935 movie, Go into Your Dance)	2:21
6.	"Alone Again Naturally"	4:42
7.	"Beyond the Sea"	3:45
8.	"I'll Be Your Baby Tonight"	3:47
9.	"If I Were a Carpenter"	3:27
10.	"Simple Song of Freedom" (Written by Bobby Darin)	4:07
11.	"Up a Lazy River"	2:58
12.	"Jive" (Written by Bobby Darin)	2:09
13.	"Rainin" (Written by Bobby Darin. Fats Domino wrote another song, It Keeps Rainin')	2:51
14.	"Long Time Movin'" (Written by Bobby Darin)	2:52
15.	"Dream Lover" (Written by Bobby Darin)	2:48
16.	"Blue Skies"	0:56
17.	"Moon River"	1:11
18.	"All the Way"	2:45
19.	"Mack the Knife"	2:54
20.	"The Curtain Falls"	4:03

DVD
No.	Title	Length
1.	"This Could Be the Start of Something Big"
2.	"Can't Take My Eyes off of You"
3.	"Song Sung Blue"
4.	"All I Have to Do Is Dream" (with Petula Clark)
5.	"A Quarter to Nine"
6.	"Alone Again Naturally"
7.	"Beyond the Sea"
8.	"Mack the Knife"
9.	"Weeping Willow"
10.	"One of Those Songs"
11.	"You're Nobody Till Somebody Loves You"
