= Sweetwater (band) =

American rock band

Sweetwater was an American rock band originally from Los Angeles, California. They were the act scheduled to open the Woodstock festival in 1969 but were delayed by traffic, so folk singer Richie Havens's trio became the first act to perform. The band was eventually flown to the festival by helicopter and performed after Swami Satchidananda's invocation.

The band were described by keyboardist Alex Del Zoppo as: "We were unusual in every aspect. We had three Black guys in the band with a White girl, an Italian piano player, a Mexican bass player, a Cuban percussionist, a Jewish drummer. The percussionist was just about 30 already. Nancy and our drummer were 17. So there was a wide range of everybody in this band."

== History ==
The original members of the band were Nancy "Nansi" Nevins (lead vocals/guitar), August Burns (cello), Albert Moore (flute/backing vocals), Alan Malarowitz (drums), Elpidio Cobian (conga), Alex Del Zoppo (keyboards), Fred Herrera (bass), and Richard Alspaugh --- stage name R.G. Carlyle (guitar, percussion).

Sweetwater originally formed to perform in local coffeehouses in Los Angeles until being signed to a major label. The members of the band were early developers of the psychedelic rock/folk rock fusion style that was popularized by acts such as Jefferson Airplane. In 1968–69, the band often toured with the Doors. They were also one of the opening acts for the Animals in 1968. One of their best-known recordings is a version of the traditional folk song "Sometimes I Feel Like a Motherless Child". It appeared on their debut album Sweetwater, the band's only album to chart nationally in the U.S. As the band progressed, their sound moved closer to that of the psychedelic folk genre.

Three days after Sweetwater performed on The Red Skelton Show on December 30, 1969, Nevins was severely injured in an auto accident with a drunk driver. She suffered a brain injury that left her in a coma for 10 days, and she suffered damage to a vocal cord as a result of the tracheotomy performed to save her life. Nevins would never again complete a full album with the band, although she still had some recordings prepared for the next two albums. For several years, there was a widespread but unfounded belief that Beverly Bivens, formerly of the West Coast group We Five, had died in a car accident. It is thought that confusion over names (Bivens/Nevins) may have contributed to this rumor.

The group reunited for Woodstock '94 in 1994 with three original members: Nevins, Herrera and Del Zoppo. Burns died after contracting pneumonia while being treated in a German hospital for injuries that he had suffered after falling out of a construction elevator in 1979, Malarowitz was killed in a car crash in 1981 and Moore died of lung cancer in 1994. Cobian works as an underwater welder in the film industry.

In 1999, the band's story was depicted in a VH1 television movie titled Sweetwater: A True Rock Story. Amy Jo Johnson portrayed Nevins as a young woman, and Michelle Phillips played Nevins as an older woman. Adam Ant also appeared in the film.

== Members ==
- Nancy Nevins (born October 12, 1949, Los Angeles County) – lead vocals
- R. G. Carlyle (born May 18, 1947, Fresno County, California) – guitar
- Fred Herrera – bass
- Alex Del Zoppo (born Alesandro Delzoppo, November 11, 1944, Los Angeles) – keyboards
- Albert B. Moore (died 1994) – flute
- August Burns (died 1979) – cello
- Alan Malarowitz (born Alan Henry Malarowitz, 20 March 1950, Los Angeles – died August 2, 1981, en route from Los Angeles to Las Vegas) – drums
- Elpidio Cobian (born Puente de Agua Dulce, Cuba) – percussion

== Discography ==
=== Sweetwater discography ===
- Sweetwater (1968)
- Just for You (1970)
- Melon (1971)
- Cycles: The Reprise Collection (1999) (Individually numbered limited edition of 10,000 copies)
- Live at Last (2002)

=== Nancy Nevins solo discography ===
- Nancy Nevins (1975)
