= Release of an Oath =

Studio album by The Electric Prunes
- Released: November 1968
- Recorded: 1968
- Genre: Psychedelic rock
- Length: 24:56
- Label: Reprise
- Producer: David Hassinger

The Electric Prunes chronology
Mass in F Minor (1968)	Release of an Oath (1968)	Just Good Old Rock and Roll (1969)

Professional ratings
Review scores
Source	Rating
Allmusic	4/5 stars
Encyclopedia of Popular Music	2/5 stars

Release of an Oath is the fourth studio album credited to The Electric Prunes, released in 1968. It was composed and arranged by David Axelrod, and band members played little part in its recording. The work follows the musical pattern of their Mass in F Minor, also composed by Axelrod.

The liner notes describe the album as a rock music setting of a service intended to release a penitent from an oath "made under duress and in violation of his principles". It is subtitled "The Kol Nidre - a prayer of antiquity", and is often referred to simply as "The Kol Nidre". The actual Kol Nidre declaration, on which the first track is based, begins the order of service of Yom Kippur in the yearly cycle of Jewish religious observance.

Despite the subtitle and popular name, the remaining tracks of the album are based on a mix of Christian and Jewish liturgies.

== Personnel ==
Although credited to the Electric Prunes, the album is largely the work of composer and producer David Axelrod and a group of session musicians. The rights to the name "The Electric Prunes" were owned by producer David Hassinger, who was encouraged by the success of the previous album, Mass in F Minor, also written and arranged by Axelrod but issued as by the Electric Prunes, to assemble a new line-up of the band. He found an existing Colorado group, Climax, who formed the basis of the "new" Electric Prunes. The line-up included Climax members Richard Whetstone (vocals, drums, percussion, guitar), John Herron (organ), and Mark Kincaid (guitar), with Brett Wade (bass guitar). With the group restructured, Axelrod composed all the material for the album, centering it around the Jewish prayer Kol Nidre and the service of Yom Kippur eve. The album, titled Release of an Oath, used several session musicians including Howard Roberts, Carol Kaye, Don Randi and Earl Palmer, and saw Whetstone as the only band member to contribute to the recordings.

Personnel included:

- Howard Roberts and Lou Morrell (guitar)
- Dick Whetstone (vocals)
- Don Randi (keyboards)
- Carol Kaye (bass)
- Earl Palmer (drums)

== Track listing ==
All tracks composed by David Axelrod.

=== Side one ===
1. "Kol Nidre" 4:14
2. "Holy Are You" 4:05
3. "General Confessional" 4:15

=== Side two ===
1. "Individual Confessional" 2:10
2. "Our Father, Our King" 3:10
3. "The Adoration" 3:48
4. "Closing Hymn" 2:53

== Influence ==
“General Confessional” was used on The Beatnuts’ 1997 album Stone Crazy, on the track "Niggaz Know".

"Holy Are You" was sampled in the track "Take Your Partner by the Hand" by Howie B and Robbie Robertson, "Return of the Loop Digga" by Quasimoto on his 2000 debut album The Unseen, the Rakim song "Holy Are You" from the 2009 album The Seventh Seal, and several other songs.

"The Adoration" was sampled in the MF Doom track "Kookies" off a re-release of the 2004 album Mm..Food.
