= Preston Ritter =

American drummer (1949–2015)

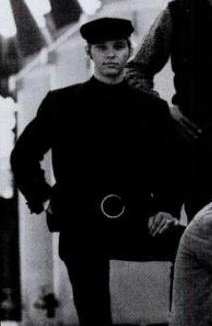
- Ritter in 1966

Background information
- Birth name: Preston James (Hord) Ritter
- Born: April 24, 1949
- Died: March 30, 2015 (aged 65); Los Angeles, California, U.S.
- Genres: Psychedelic rock
- Occupation(s): Drummer, music teacher
- Years active: 1960s–2015
- Formerly of: The Electric Prunes

Preston James Ritter (April 24, 1949 – March 30, 2015) was an American drummer.

== Career ==
At age seventeen, he joined The Electric Prunes in 1966, and played on their debut studio album, The Electric Prunes, and two hit singles, including I Had Too Much to Dream (Last Night). Ritter was ultimately replaced by Michael Weakley during recording of the band's second album, Underground, in 1967. Ritter was left uncredited on Underground. Ritter was a member of the Electric Prunes during their prime, and appeared with them on American Bandstand, Where the Action Is, The Mike Douglas Show and The Smothers Brothers Comedy Hour.

He was later involved with Linda Ronstadt, The Beach Boys, and Dobie Gray. He worked as a DJ, police officer and private investigator before becoming a Christian missionary in Korea, where he taught theology. In later years he returned to Los Angeles, and taught and wrote books on drumming.

== Death ==
Ritter has two daughters, Hannah and Larissa. After several years of dialysis for kidney problems, including two kidney transplants, he died in Los Angeles on March 30, 2015, at age 65.

== Discography ==
- The Electric Prunes (1967)
- Underground (1967)
