= Lick the Tins =

Celtic rock band

- Origin: London, England
- Genres: Celtic, folk rock, indie
- Past members: Alison Marr; Ronan Heenan; Simon Ryan; Martin Hughes; Aidan McCroary

Lick the Tins was an English Celtic/folk rock/indie band from London, active in the mid to late 1980s. The name was derived from a nickname given to an old tramp by the children from the hometown of one of the band members, Ronan Heenan. They are best known for their cover version of "Can't Help Falling in Love".

== Career ==
"Can't Help Falling in Love" spent nine weeks on the UK Singles Chart in early 1986, reaching a peak of number 42. Where the Elvis Presley version of the song was long and relaxed, Lick the Tin's version was so manic and fast that it was considerably less than three minutes long. As a result, three Irish polkas were added to the end of the track to bring it to the desired length.

"Can't Help Falling in Love" is featured in the Irish film The Snapper. A remix of the song by Stephen Hague is featured in the John Hughes 1987 film Some Kind of Wonderful. It is also featured during the closing credits of the 1989 film Chances Are.

Lick the Tins had two other minor singles, "Belle of Belfast City" (cover of "I'll Tell Me Ma") and "In the Middle of the Night", after which Simon Ryan left the band and was replaced by Martin Hughes, another Ulsterman. Lick the Tins played the college and club circuits for another year, before the band broke up.

== Band members ==
- Alison Marr – vocals, penny whistle
- Ronan Heenan – vocals, guitar
- Simon Ryan / Martin Hughes – drums
- Aidan McCroary – bass, keyboards

== Discography ==
=== Album ===
- 1986: Blind Man on a Flying Horse

=== Singles ===
- 1985: "Can't Help Falling in Love" (Sedition)
  - "Bad Dreams" (B-side)
- 1986: "Belle of Belfast City"
  - "Calliope House" (B-side)
- 1987: "In the Middle of the Night"
  - "It Looks Like You" (B-side)
  - "Road to California" (only on the 12" release)
