= The Brogues =

American garage rock band

- The Brogues in 1965

Background information
- Origin: Merced, California, U.S.
- Genre: Garage rock
- Years active: 1964–1965
- Past members: Eddie Rodrigues; Rick Campbell; Greg Elmore; Bill Whittington; Gary Duncan

The Brogues were an American garage rock band formed in Merced, California, in 1964. Much of the group's brief recording career was marked by distorted-guitar melodies and R&B-influenced vocals. They released two regionally successful singles in their brief existence, most notably the Annette Tucker and Nancie Mantz-penned "I Ain't No Miracle Worker", which is now considered a classic of the garage rock genre. The song has also appeared on several compilation albums and has been covered by other music artists.

== History ==
The band members all possessed prior experience on the R&B club circuit before coming together as a group influenced by the outset of the British Invasion, more specifically the music of the Animals and the Pretty Things. The group's name, the Brogues, was chosen to represent "American music with a British accent". The band's original lineup, consisting of Eddie Rodrigues (lead guitar), Rick Campbell (organ), Greg Elmore (drums) and Bill Whittington (bass), debuted on New Year's Eve and immediately gained a loyal local following in their hometown of Merced and an emerging presence in San Francisco. While their contemporaries outfitted themselves conservatively, the Brogues sported a rebellious image and performed hard-edged cover versions of British R&B standards such as "Hubble Bubble Toil and Trouble" and "Mama Keep Your Big Mouth Shut".

Initially, the Brogues' high energy performances were received with negative reception by San Francisco's burgeoning folk movement. Nonetheless, the area quickly developed a liking for the group's sound, and, noticing their rising notoriety, the Brogues self-recorded several demos in Fresno. Though the cuts garnered little interest from most of the record companies the group presented them to Clara Thompson of the small record label Hush Records, who upon hearing the tapes, immediately instructed her son to sign the Brogues to a recording contract. On June 23, 1965, the band entered Coast Recorders Studio in San Francisco to record their two original numbers "Somebody" and "But Now I Find". "Somebody", which saw Campbell switch to bass guitar and Whittington to acoustic guitar, was a folk rock tune. The latter song, "But Now I Find", better represented the group's sound in live performances with Kinks-inspired instrumental arrangements. In August 1965, "Somebody" was released as the Brogues' debut single, which peaked at number 31 on Bakersfield's KAFY radio and reached number 14 on KYOS radio.

As a result of the single's regional success, the group toured with other musical acts like the Zombies, Jewel Akens, and Shirley Ellis, among others. After a performance in Stockton with local group the Ratz, the Brogues enticed their singer Gary Cole (also known as Gary Duncan) to join the group. Once their stay in San Francisco ended, the band traveled to Sunset Recorders in Los Angeles to record their follow-up single for Challenge Records, who had purchased the distribution rights to "Somebody". Pressed for time, the group recorded the Annette Tucker and Nancie Mantz-penned song "I Ain't No Miracle Worker", and composed "Don't Shoot Me Down" right in the studio. However, the group's "I Ain't No Miracle Worker" failed to breakout nationally as a consequence of their record label focusing their advertising efforts on The Knickerbockers' hit "Lies". Since its initial release, "I Ain't No Miracle Worker" has become considered a garage rock classic and is featured on the 1998 reissue of the compilation album Nuggets: Original Artyfacts from the First Psychedelic Era, 1965–1968. The Brogues disbanded before they could promote the single when Rodrigues and Campbell were conscripted and the group could not find suitable replacements.

After the band's breakup, Duncan and Elmore stayed in San Francisco and formed the psychedelic rock band Quicksilver Messenger Service. Additionally, Whittington joined the folk rock group, the Family Tree. In 1996, Sundazed Music released an extended play containing the Brogues' material on their two singles.

== Discography ==
- "Someday"/"But Now I Find" (7", Twilight, 1965)
- "Don't Shoot Me Down"/"I Ain't No Miracle Worker" (7", Challenge, 1965)
- "Modern Modes"
- "25th and a Half"
- "Won't Explain"
