= David Hassinger =

American audio engineer (1927–2007)

Dave Hassinger
- Born: Walter David Hassinger; 31 March 1927; Los Angeles, California, U.S.
- Died: 15 August 2007 (aged 80) Vancouver, Washington, U.S.
- Genres: Pop, rock
- Occupations: Record producer, sound engineer

Walter David Hassinger (March 31, 1927 – August 15, 2007) was an American Grammy Award-winning recording engineer and record producer.

== Biography ==
=== Early years ===
Born in Los Angeles, California, he joined the U.S. Navy aged 17, and was one of the first divers on the USS Oklahoma at Pearl Harbor. He became a radio engineer in the Navy, before leaving due to illness and moving to Alaska, where he helped set up radio stations in Seward and Anchorage.

=== Career ===
==== In recording ====
After a few years he returned to California, and began working as a sound engineer at RCA Records in Los Angeles. During 1964 he served as "audio consultant" for the landmark concert film The T.A.M.I. Show. He won a Grammy in 1964 for Best Engineered Recording - Special Or Novel Effects, for his work on The Chipmunks Sing the Beatles Hits.

From November 1964 until August 1966 he was often the chief engineer for the Rolling Stones, primarily on the dates when they recorded at the RCA studios in Los Angeles, working on several albums and singles with the band during that period. Hassinger discovered, signed and managed the Electric Prunes, owning the rights to the band's name and engineering all of their recordings from their second single and first hit until their breakup in the early 1970s. Other musicians with whom he worked included Jefferson Airplane, the Mamas and the Papas, the Grateful Dead, Elvis Presley, Frank Sinatra, the Monkees, Liverpool Five, Love, The Seeds, The Collectors, Crosby Stills Nash and Young, the Jackson 5, Leo Kottke, Seals and Crofts, the Blackbyrds, Sweetwater, and George Strait. The Doors' producer Paul Rothchild described Hassinger as "a perfect example of a great engineer in a bad studio.... one of the great engineers in the world today... [T]hat Hassinger was able to go as far as he did with that studio [RCA] is a mark of his excellence as an engineer."

In 1969, Hassinger purchased the Moonglow Records building in Hollywood and renamed it the Sound Factory. The Sound Factory went on to become one of the most popular recording studios in Hollywood. He later worked for KPSI-FM radio in Palm Springs.

==== As a producer ====
- Electric Prunes:
  - The Electric Prunes (1967)
  - Underground (1967)
  - Mass in F Minor (1968)
  - Release of an Oath (1968)
  - Just Good Old Rock and Roll (1969)
- Grateful Dead:
  - The Grateful Dead (1967)
  - Anthem of the Sun (1968)
- The Collectors:
  - The Collectors (1968)
  - Grass & Wild Strawberries (1969)
- Sweetwater:
  - Sweetwater (1968)
- Mojo:
  - Mojo Magic (1969)
- Mephistopheles
  - In Frustration I Hear Singing (1969)

=== Death ===
He died at a nursing home in Vancouver, Washington in 2007, aged 80.
