= Annette Tucker =

American songwriter

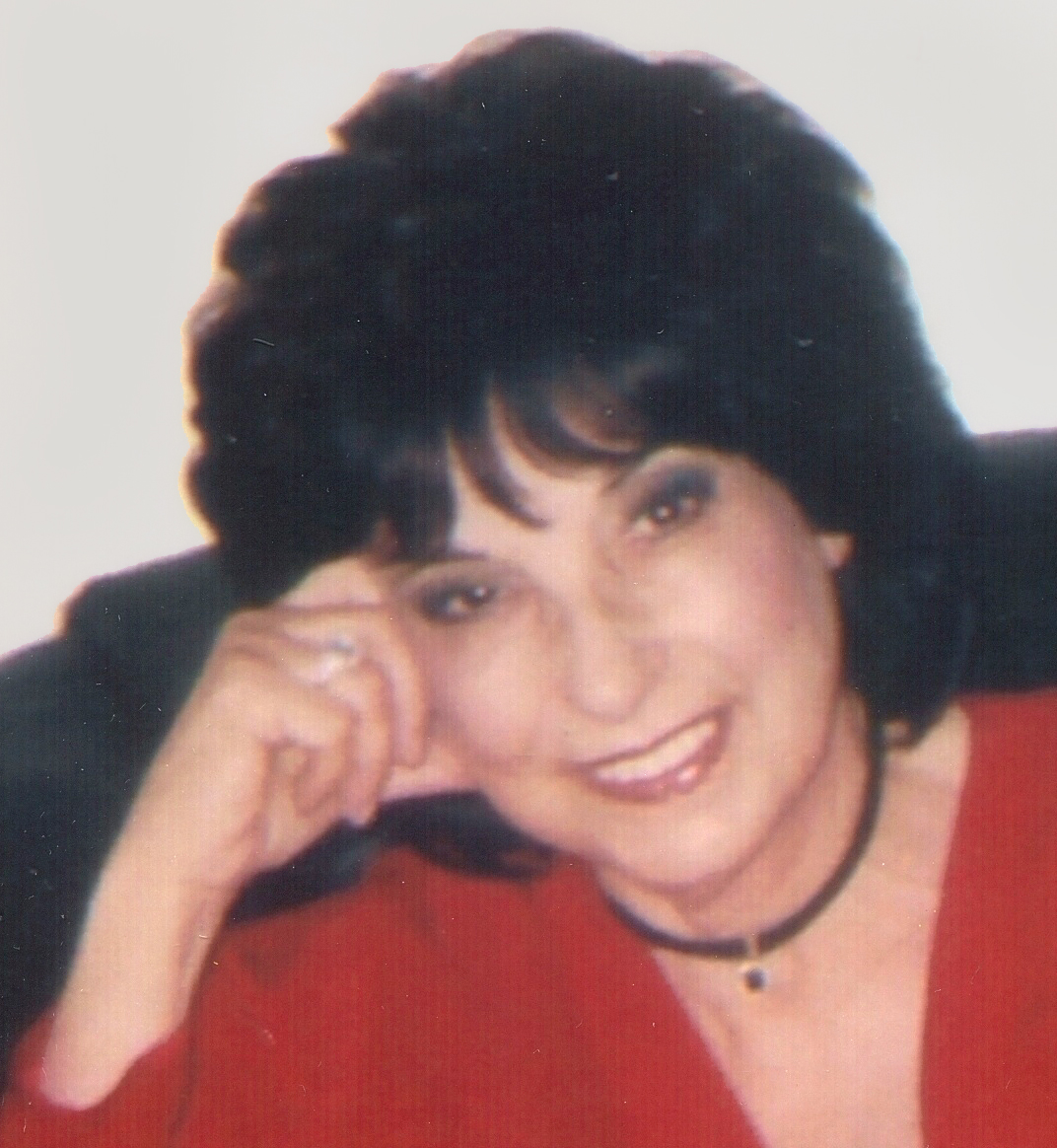

Background information
- Born: Annette May Tucker; Los Angeles, California, United States
- Genres: Rock, pop, country
- Occupations: Songwriter, record producer, arranger, teacher

Annette May Tucker was an American songwriter, who found success in the 1960s as co-writer of songs for The Electric Prunes ("I Had Too Much to Dream (Last Night)", "Get Me to the World on Time"), The Brogues ("I Ain't No Miracle Worker"), The Knickerbockers ("A Coming Generation"), Nancy and Frank Sinatra ("Feelin' Kinda Sunday") and others.

== Career ==
Tucker was born in Los Angeles. In 1961, as an aspiring songwriter, she met musician and songwriter Al Hazan, and together they wrote "Stick Around", which Tucker recorded. It was released as a single by Piper Records in Los Angeles in 1962. However, she aimed to become a songwriter rather than a singer.

The following year, she introduced herself to the 4 Star music company on Sunset Boulevard with some songs she had written. They were impressed, and teamed her with another aspiring songwriter, Nancie Mantz. The first song they wrote together, "She's Somethin' Else", was recorded by Freddy Cannon and released as a single in 1965. The same year, she co-wrote, with Mantz and another 4 Star writer, Jill Jones, "A Coming Generation", which became the B-side of The Knickerbockers' hit, "Lies"; she also co-wrote their follow-up, "High On Love", with Linda and Keith Colley. In 1966, she and Mantz wrote "I Ain't No Miracle Worker", which was recorded by garage band the Brogues. An Italian version, with rewritten lyrics as "Un ragazzo di strada", was a number one hit record in Italy for I Corvi. Both the English and Italian versions were later recorded by other bands, including the Chocolate Watchband.

In 1966, Tucker came up with the title "I Had Too Much To Dream", and wrote the song with Mantz. Tucker said: "The Prunes were an unknown group who I hired to play at a surprise party I gave for my husband. I thought they were a very creative and talented group. A cousin of my husband's brought them to Dave Hassinger, and he came to me asking for material. I played him 'Too Much To Dream' and he loved it and had all sorts of great ideas for it. When that became a hit he only wanted to use the songs that I had a part of." After "I Had Too Much To Dream" became a hit, Tucker co-wrote many of the tracks recorded by the Electric Prunes on their first two albums, mostly with Mantz although she wrote the follow-up single "Get Me To The World On Time" with Jill Jones. According to Tucker, "Nancie and I were told to write different types of songs for the Prunes [first] album. So that is what we did... It was a great feeling to have eight songs on the album."

Tucker also wrote or co-wrote "I Get Carried Away" by Tom Jones (written with Mantz and Keith Colley) she has a gold album for. "I Love What You Did With The Love I Gave You" by Sonny and Cher (written with Linda Laurie), also another gold album . "Feelin' Kinda Sunday" by Nancy and Frank Sinatra (written with Nino Tempo and Kathy Wakefield), "Green Light" by The American Breed, a chart record "Your Kind of Lovin'" by Rick Nelson (written with Jill Jones), and "Love Songs Are Getting Harder To Sing" by Maureen McGovern another chart record (written with Hod David, James Serrett and Arthur Hamilton), among others. Many of her songs have been used in TV shows and movies; "Feelin Kinda Sunday", was selected for a State Farm commercial on Fox's Sunday NFL football games.

After Tucker and Mantz left 4 Star, they spent some time at Shapiro, Bernstein & Co., before Mantz left the music business. Tucker and Kathy Wakefield were then contracted to Jobete Music where they wrote songs for The Jackson 5,"Someone's Standing in My Love Light", and "If You Want Heaven". They later worked at Tamerlane Music at Warner Brothers, and then Wakefield and Tucker were with Don Costa. In the 1970s, Tucker taught songwriting skills at ASCAP workshops and at the University of California, Los Angeles, and other colleges.

In 1997 she won first place in the American Jewish Song Festival for the lyrics she wrote for Aaron Kaplan's music on a song titled "We're Coming Home", which was chosen out of 1,000 songs that were submitted from all over the world. She wrote a weekly reviewer's column for Songwriter magazine, and read and reviewed scripts for the Papazian-Hersh entertainment company. She also wrote songs for commercials for Westfield shopping center and comedy songs for Premiere Radio. She has produced two pilots for syndication, including a children's musical for which she wrote the music and lyrics, and wrote six songs for a documentary on Michel Legrand in 2012. She has also written lyrics for a Broadway show, and with Aaron Kaplan wrote the song for the video "Got To Be You And Me", performed by the children's group Heart to Heart. In November 2014 Tucker released the Christmas song "Who Put The Merry In Merry Christmas", with an accompanying video and has written a Christmas song "Everyday Is Christmas When I'm With You", which was put out as a work for hire on Venus Moon Records. Tucker is currently writing with some new writers in the country field and still teaching songwriting privately and reviewing lyrics from publishers that they send to get her opinion on.
