= The Electric Prunes =

American psychedelic rock band

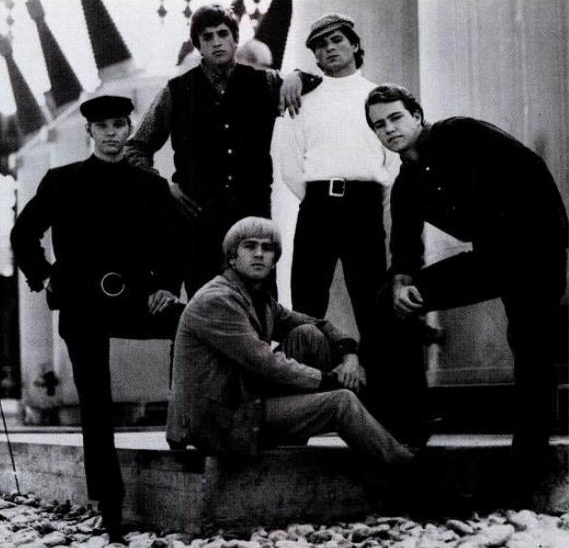
- The Electric Prunes in 1966. Clockwise from left: Preston Ritter, Mark Tulin, James Spagnola, Ken Williams and James Lowe

Background information
- Origin: San Fernando Valley, Los Angeles, California, United States
- Genres: Psychedelic rock; garage rock; acid rock; electronic rock; garage-psych
- Years active: 1965–1970, 1999–present
- Labels: Reprise; Radar; Heartbeat; Birdman
- Members: Steve Kara; Jay Dean; Walter Garces; Rocco Guarino
- Past members: James Lowe; Mark Tulin; Ken Williams; Michael Weakley; Steve Acoff; Dick Hargraves; Preston Ritter; James Spagnola; Joe Dooley; Mike Gannon; John Herron; Mark Kincaid; Brett Wade; Dick Whetstone; Kenny Loggins; Jeromy Stuart; Ron Morgan; Cameron Lowe; Mark Moulin; Glen Bostic
- Website: www.electricprunes67.com

The Electric Prunes are an American psychedelic rock band, formed in Los Angeles, California, in 1965. Much of the band's music was, as music historian Richie Unterberger described it, possessed of "an eerie and sometimes anguished ambiance." Their most successful material was by songwriters Annette Tucker and Nancie Mantz, though the group also penned their own songs. Incorporating psychedelia and elements of embryonic electronic rock, the band's sound was marked by innovative recording techniques with fuzz-toned guitars and oscillating sound effects. In addition, guitarist Ken Williams' and singer James Lowe's concept of "free-form garage music" provided the band with a richer sonic palette and exploratory lyrical structure than many of their contemporaries.

The band was signed to Reprise Records in 1966 and released their first single, "Ain't It Hard", in the latter part of the year. Their first album, The Electric Prunes, included the band's two nationally charting songs, "I Had Too Much to Dream (Last Night)" and "Get Me to the World on Time". With the appearance of their second album, Underground, the band was more free to create their own material. However, the original group disbanded by 1968 when they proved unable to record the innovative and complex arrangements by David Axelrod on the albums Mass in F Minor and Release of an Oath. Both albums were released under the band's name, the rights to which were owned by their record producer David Hassinger, but were largely performed by other musicians. Several of the original band members reconvened in 1999 and began recording again. The band still performs occasionally, although the only remaining original member, lead singer James Lowe, died in May 2025.

== History ==
=== Origin ===
The band originated from a surf rock-influenced garage rock group, the Sanctions, in 1965. The Sanctions, which included James Lowe (vocals, guitar), Mark Tulin (bass guitar), Ken Williams (lead guitar), and Michael "Quint" Weakley (drums), recorded 12 cover songs on an acetate disc on March 27, 1965, in a home studio owned by Russ Bottomley. For their next set of recordings on September 29, 1965, the group, then known as Jim and the Lords, was joined by keyboardist Dick Hargrave, who left shortly afterwards to pursue a career in graphic arts. (The songs went unreleased until Heartbeat Productions distributed the 2000 album, Then Came The Electric Prunes, which was commended for its good sound quality, considering the circumstances in which it was recorded.)

Back to a quartet, the band, while rehearsing in a garage, met a real estate agent named Barbara Harris. Harris had connections in the music industry, and introduced the group to Dave Hassinger to record demos at Sky Hill Studios. Hassinger, who had been working as the resident sound engineer at RCA Studios and recently completed development for The Rolling Stones' album, Aftermath, expressed a desire to produce a record. He suggested to the group that they change their name, and they considered a list of alternatives. According to Lowe, the name Electric Prunes started off as a joke, but he eventually convinced other band members, saying, "It's the one thing everyone will remember. It's not attractive, and there's nothing sexy about it, but people won't forget it." As a result of the recordings, a single, featuring a cover of the Gypsy Trips' folk rock tune, "Ain't It Hard", and the Lowe-penned song, "Little Olive", was released in early 1966, but failed to chart.

=== Early success ===
Despite the commercial failure of "Ain't It Hard", Reprise Records was encouraged by the group's effort, and signed the band to a recording contract that left them under Hassinger's authority. Weakley departed the band after the single, and was replaced by Preston Ritter, and rhythm guitarist James "Weasel" Spagnola was recruited to make The Electric Prunes a quintet. Although the band was composing their own material, Hassinger called upon songwriters Annette Tucker and Nancie Mantz to write the majority of the group's songs. The new line-up recorded six demos at American Recording Studio and Leon Russell's Skyhill Studios studio. These mainly comprised cover songs and Tucker-Mantz compositions. According to Lowe, while at Russell's recording studio, "Dave cued up a tape and didn't hit 'record,' and the playback in the studio was way up: ear-shattering vibrating jet guitar. Ken had been shaking his Bigsby wiggle stick with some fuzztone and tremolo at the end of the tape. Forward it was cool. Backward it was amazing. I ran into the control room and said, 'What was that?' They didn't have the monitors on so they hadn't heard it. I made Dave cut it off and save it for later." The fluttering buzz sound was utilized for the opening to the Tucker-Mantz song, "I Had Too Much to Dream (Last Night)", which also included a heavily textured psychedelic guitar motif. The song was chosen to be released as The Electric Prunes' second single in November 1966. It peaked at number 11 on the Billboard Hot 100 and reached number 49 on the UK Singles Chart. The success of the single prompted immediate touring, and earned the group a promotional contract with musical equipment makers Vox. Williams recorded an advert, demonstrating the use of Vox's wah-wah pedal in early 1967, and the band was featured in magazines such as Vox Teen Beat.

The band's follow-up single, "Get Me to the World on Time", which put distorted sound effects to a psychedelic-tinged Bo Diddley beat, was released in May 1967. The song managed to chart at number 27 in the US and number 42 in the UK, and was the most electronically experimental composition by the group thus far. When it came time for The Electric Prunes to record songs for their first album, they were limited musically due to the predominant presence of Tucker and Mantz's (also Jill Jones) songwriting partnership, which composed the majority of the album's material. The group's debut album, The Electric Prunes possessed exotically combined effects, and violin-like guitar riffs, mixed with a diverse, and somewhat uneven, selection of pop songs, with only "Train For Tomorrow" and "Luvin'" being penned by the band. Tracks such as the soft rock tune, "Onie" and "Toonerville Trolley" suggest inconsistency in an attempt to produce a commercially viable sound. Reflecting on the album, Tulin said, "Consequently there are definitely songs that I believe do not belong on the album and were, in fact, a waste of our time and energy. There were several other ideas we were working on, but [we] realized there was no use pursuing them because they too would have been 'too weird.'"

In July 1967, the band released their fourth single, one of the more unusual compositions to come from the pen of the Tucker-Mantz songwriting duo, "Dr. Do-Good". The song, which featured Williams playing a prototype steel guitar, and childlike to maddening vocals, was described by music historian Richie Unterberger as "sounding more like a horror movie theme run amok than a radio-ready hit", and consequently the single bubbled under the Hot 100 at number 128. The Electric Prunes reconvened at American Recording Studios to record their second album, Underground, though Hassinger was not as involved in the band's activities, which allowed much more creative freedom to the group to write their own material. For the album, the band wrote seven of the twelve tracks, and expanded upon the experimentation of the first album, with inventive guitar reverb and oscillation, in a unified effort. However, in the middle of the recording sessions the line-up went through changes when Ritter departed for musical differences, and was replaced by original drummer Weakley, who appeared on five tracks. Spagnola left near the conclusion of recording to address medical concerns, and Mike Gannon was recruited to finish the album. Gannon was included on just two songs as well as the non-album track, "Everybody Knows You're Not In Love". In August 1967, Underground was released, but, without a hit-ready single, did not fare as well on the Billboard 200, where it peaked at number 172. After a U.S. tour in the latter half of 1967, the new line-up embarked on a European tour and this led to appearances at high-profile venues such as The Roundhouse, The Speakeasy Club and Middle Earth. On the final leg of the tour, The Electric Prunes' performance was recorded in Stockholm by the Swedish Broadcasting Corporation. The recordings were issued in 1997 on the live album, Stockholm '67.

=== The Axelrod period ===
At the suggestion of manager Lenny Poncher and Hassinger, The Electric Prunes agreed to record a concept album that integrated Gregorian music into psychedelic pop, with the belief it would launch them into commercial success. Poncher recruited David Axelrod, a formally classically trained musician, to compose all of the material for the project. The result, Mass in F Minor, was a complex arrangement of religious-based rock, which was sung entirely in Greek and Latin. Although the band did record the songs "Kyrie Eleison", "Gloria", and "Credo", the intricate orchestration proved to be too difficult and time-consuming for the group. As a consequence, Hassinger enlisted the Canadian group The Collectors, among other session musicians, in completing the album, although Lowe, Tulin, and Weakley did contribute to every track.

Mass in F Minor was released in January 1968 and reached number 135 on the Billboard 200. An eerie version of the opening track, "Kyrie Eleison", became somewhat of an underground favorite when it appeared in the soundtrack for the counterculture film, Easy Rider.

The Electric Prunes performed with the new songs in concert just once, at the Santa Monica Civic Auditorium, which Tulin described: "From the outset the performance was a disaster. We missed the intro on the first song and it never got any better. Amp speakers blew, charts fell off music stands and everyone was, in general, in a complete state of confusion. Ended up each song turned into one long jam. I think we were, at times, all in the same key. I made my way over to the four celli and four French horns and told them to 'jam in E.' Somehow we would hit a break and James would manage a vocal".

As a result of financial and musical issues, Weakley and Lowe left the group in early 1968. Tulin and Williams finished a tour with a line-up that also included Kenny Loggins and Jeremy Stuart, but by mid-1968 they too departed the group.

Nonetheless, Hassinger still owned the rights to The Electric Prunes's name, and was encouraged by the success of Mass in F Minor, which prompted him to assemble a new line-up. He was steered toward the Colorado group, Climax, by Rich Fifield. Fifield had worked in fellow Colorado band, Hardwater (previously the surf rock band The Astronauts), which was managed by Poncher, and produced an album with Axelrod. The new Electric Prunes line-up included Climax members Richard Whetstone (vocals, drums, percussion, guitar), John Herron (organ), and Mark Kincaid (guitar) with Brett Wade (bass guitar), who was recommended by The Collectors. With the group restructured, Axelrod, again, composed all the material for their next album, in the same vein as the previous effort, and centered it around the Jewish prayer, Kol Nidre. The album, titled Release of an Oath, utilized several session musicians including Howard Roberts, Carol Kaye, and Earl Palmer, and saw Whetstone as the only band member to contribute to the recordings. Although the album was considered more cohesive and progressive than its predecessor, it failed to chart upon its release in November 1968. Afterwards, Axelrod returned to his past position at Capitol Records, and The Electric Prunes toured as a supporting act for bands such as Steppenwolf, Canned Heat, and New Buffalo Springfield.

=== The "New Improved" Electric Prunes ===
The band's final album, Just Good Old Rock and Roll, was released in June 1969 with the cover describing the group as The "New Improved" Electric Prunes. Herron left the group before they completed recording of the album, although he was still credited as the keyboardist. He was replaced by Ron Morgan, who had been the guitarist of Three Dog Night, and an essential session musician for the first three albums released by The West Coast Pop Art Experimental Band. With the exception of "Finders Keepers, Losers Weepers", which was co-written by Jimmy Holiday, all the songs on Just Good Old Rock and Roll were composed solely by the band. In addition, Wade composed "Flowing Smoothly", the B-side to the non-album single, "Hey, Mr. President".

Just Good Old Rock and Roll is much more straightforward than past works, consisting of funk-influenced hard rock, although "So Many People to Tell" and "Silver Passion Mine" also exhibit a late-psychedelic sound. As Whetstone explains, "We were fairly naive in terms of guidance; we had none, so we were experimenting with a lot of musical styles. If you listen to the album, you'll hear a lot of diversity, feel and tempo changes...That was our learning curve." In early 1970, Whetstone and Wade departed the band and moved to Canada where they formed Stallion Thumbrock. Morgan and Kincaid constructed another line-up of The Electric Prunes that included Michael Kearns, Clay Groomer, Huey Plumeigh, and Galen Pugh; however, by mid-1970 the band dissolved.

=== Revival and reformation ===
Although the band broke up in 1970, their material continued to be circulated through reissues and compilation albums. Following the inclusion of "I Had Too Much to Dream (Last Night)" as the first track on the seminal Nuggets: Original Artyfacts from the First Psychedelic Era, 1965–1968 in 1972, a slow return of interest in the band's music began. In Europe, the band's albums were re-released, with 1986 seeing the reissue of Underground, Release of an Oath, and, essentially The Electric Prunes's first greatest hits album, Long Days Flight. This was the first album to include their first single, "Ain't It Hard", the non-LP track "You Never Had It Better", and the first to be released on the compact disc format in 1989.

By 1997, all of the group's albums were available via compact disc. Following the release of the 1997 live album, Stockholm '67, on Heartbeat Records, the original line-up of Tulin, Lowe, Williams, and Weakley (now known as Fortune) reconvened, in 1999, to record new material for the first time in 31 years. After the success of the 2001 compilation album, Lost Dreams, the band began to perform live again along with new members.

On October 31, 2001, the band released the album, Artifact, which included several guest musicians, most notably former Moby Grape guitarist, Peter Lewis. Deemed the "one we never got to make", the album was a cohesive take on the band's psychedelic sound. In August 2002, the group toured Europe for the first time since 1968, with concerts in the UK and Greece and, in 2003, a DVD looking into the UK portion of their European tour, called Rewired, was released. Additional albums were released over the years, including the concept album, California, in 2004, and their most experimental album since The Electric Prunes's reformation, Feedback, in 2006.

On February 26, 2011, Tulin died aged 62 from a heart attack while volunteering at the University of Southern California Catalina Hyperbaric Chamber. After Tulin's death, the band went on hiatus, but returned to touring in 2013. On May 22, 2014, the band released WaS, which featured new material inspired by the group's tour in Tokyo, Japan. The album includes the last recordings with Tulin, and the two live tracks, "Smokestack Lightning" and "Bullet Thru the Backseat". Preston Ritter died in 2015, aged 65.

On May 29, 2025, it was announced via the band's Facebook page that the band's lead singer and frontman James Lowe had died on May 22 at the age of 82.

== Musical style ==
"Experimental and sometimes eerie, the Prunes were recognized for embracing early elements of psychedelic and acid rock," according to Loren DiBlasi of Paste Magazine.

== Band members ==
=== Current members ===
- Steve Kara – lead guitar, backing vocals (2003–present)
- Jay Dean – rhythm guitar, backing vocals (2004–present)
- Walter Garces – drums (2006–present)
- Rocco Guarino– bass, backing vocals (2013–present)

=== Former members ===
- James Lowe – lead vocals, harmonica, percussion, theremin, guitar, autoharp (1965–1968, 1999–2025; his death)
- Mark Tulin – bass, keyboards (1965–1968, 1999–2011; his death)
- Ken Williams – lead guitar (1965–1968, 1999–2003, 2006)
- Michael "Quint" Weakley – drums, percussion (1965–1966, 1967, 2001; died 2024)
- Steve Acoff (1965)
- Dick Hargraves – keyboards (1965)
- Preston Ritter – drums, percussion (1966–1967; died 2015)
- James "Weasel" Spagnola – rhythm guitar, backing and lead vocals (1966–1967; died c.2000)
- Joe Dooley – drums (1967–1968, 2001–2005)
- Mike Gannon – rhythm guitar (1967–1968; died 1972)
- John Herron – keyboards (1968–1970; died 2003)
- Mark Kincaid – guitar, backing vocals (1968–1970; died c.1994)
- Brett Wade – bass, backing vocals, flute (1968–1970)
- Dick Whetstone – drums, lead vocals, guitar (1968–1970)
- Kenny Loggins (1968)
- Jeromy Stuart (1968)
- Ron Morgan – guitar (1969–1970; died 1989)
- Cameron Lowe – keyboards (2001–2003)
- Mark Moulin – lead guitar (2001–2003)
- Glen Bostic (2007)

== Discography ==
=== Studio albums ===
- The Electric Prunes (1967)
- Underground (1967)
- Mass in F Minor (Composed by David Axelrod) (1968)
- Release of an Oath (Composed by David Axelrod) (1968)
- Just Good Old Rock and Roll (1969)
- Artifact (2001)
- California (2004)
- Feedback (2006)
- WaS (2014)

=== Live albums ===
- Stockholm '67 (Heartbeat BMRO39), 1997
- Return to Stockholm Live at Debaser 2004 (PruneTwang 8-69691-13), 2012

=== U.S. singles ===
- "Ain't It Hard" / "Little Olive" (Reprise 0473), 1966
- "I Had Too Much to Dream (Last Night)" / "Luvin" (Reprise 0532) 1966 (US number 11, UK number 49)
- "Get Me to the World on Time" / "Are You Lovin' Me More (But Enjoying it Less)" (Reprise 0564), 1966, (US number 27, UK number 42)
- "Vox Wah-Wah Ad" (Thomas 08-000132-0), 1967
- "Dr. Do-Good" / "Hideaway" (Reprise 0594), 1967 (US number 128)
- "The Great Banana Hoax" / "Wind-up Toys" (Reprise 0607), 1967
- "Everybody Knows You're Not in Love" / "You Never Had it Better" (Reprise 0652), 1968
- "I Had Too Much to Dream (Last Night)" / "Get Me to the World on Time" (Reprise 0704 – Double A-side), 1968
- "Shadows" (Reprise PRO 287), 1968, one-sided single
- "Sanctus" / "Credo" (Reprise PRO 277), 1968
- "Help Us (Our Father, Our King)" / "The Adoration" (Reprise PRO 305), 1968
- "Hey! Mr. President" / "Flowing Smoothly" (Reprise 0756), 1969
- "Sell" / "Violent Rose" (Reprise 0833), 1969
- "Love Grows" / "Finders, Keepers, Losers, Weepers" (Reprise 0858), 1969
- "Hollywood Halloween" (Birdman Records BMR1313), 2001, Peter Lewis (Moby Grape) backed by The Electric Prunes)
- "Get Me to the World on Time" (Live) (Birdman Records BMR037), 2002 (recorded at Voxfest III in June 2001)
- "Left in Blue" (original by Azure Halo)

=== European singles ===
- "I Had Too Much to Dream (Last Night)" / "Luvin" (Reprise RS 20532), 1966, UK
- "Get Me to the World on Time" / "Are You Lovin Me More (But Enjoying It Less)" (Reprise RS 20564), 1967, UK
- "The Great Banana Hoax" / "Wind-Up Toys" (Reprise RS 20607), 1967, UK
- "Long Days Flight" / "The King In His Counting House" (Reprise RS 23212), 1967, UK
- "I Had Too Much To Dream (Last Night)" / "Luvin'" / "Little Olive" / "Ain't It Hard" (Reprise RVEP 60098), 1967, France
- "Everybody Knows You're Not In Love" / "You Never Had It Better" (Reprise RS 20652), 1968, UK
- "Long Day's Flight" / "Dr. Do-Good" / "The Great Banana Hoax" / "Captain Glory" (Reprise RVEP 60110), 1968, France
- "Everybody Knows You're Not In Love" / "You Never Had It Better" (Reprise RV 20149), 1968, France
- "Hey Mr President" / "Flowing Smoothly" (Reprise RV 20198), 1969, France
- "I Had Too Much To Dream (Last Night)" / ("Lies" by the Knickerbockers) (Elektra K 12102), 1973 (from the Nuggets compilation), UK
- "I Had Too Much To Dream (Last Night)" / "Luvin" (Radar ADA 16 – picture sleeve reissue), 1979, UK

=== Compilation albums ===
- Long Day's Flight (Edsel Records / Demon Records), 1986, UK
- The Singles (Gone Beat), 1995, Israel
- Lost Dreams (Birdman Records / Heartbeat Records), 2000, US
- The Sanctions / Jim and the Lords - Then Came the Electric Prunes (Heartbeat Productions), 2000, UK (pre-Electric Prunes recordings)
- Too Much To Dream - Original Group Recordings: Reprise 1966-1967 (Rhino Records / Reprise Records), 2007, UK & Europe
- The Original Albums Series, 5-CD box set, released 2012

=== Various ===
- Easy Rider, 1969 (includes "Kyrie Eleison")
- Nuggets: Original Artyfacts from the First Psychedelic Era, 1965–1968 (includes "I Had Too Much To Dream (Last Night)"), 1972 Elektra, reissued 1976 Sire, reissued 1998 as a four-CD box set by Rhino, also includes "Get Me to the World on Time").
- Pebbles, Volume 2, 1979 (includes "Vox Wah-Wah Radio Ad"), BFD Records, reissued 1992 on CD by AIP Records
- Rarities, 1981 (4 songs from a 1967 concert in Stockholm plus the Vox ad, split with Count Five), Great Live Concerts label

=== DVDs ===
- Rewired (Snapper Music), 2002, UK
