= Mark Tulin =

American musician (1948–2011)

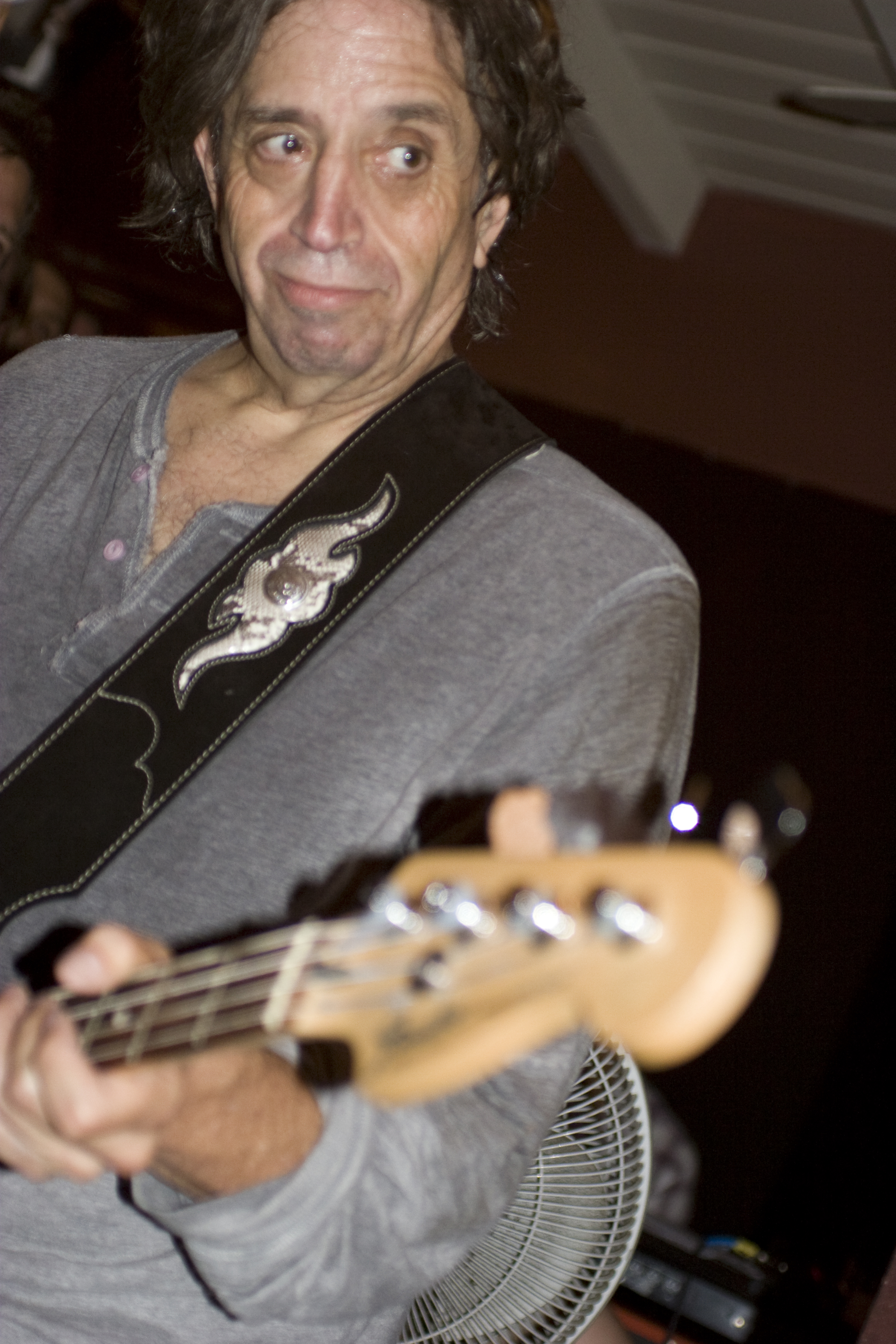
- Tulin in 2009 performing with Spirits in the Sky

Background information
- Born: November 21, 1948; Philadelphia, Pennsylvania, U.S.
- Died: February 26, 2011 (aged 62) Avalon, California, U.S.
- Genres: Rock, psychedelic rock, garage rock
- Occupation: Musician
- Instrument: Bass guitar
- Years active: 1965-2011

Mark Shalom Tulin (November 21, 1948 – February 26, 2011) was an American bass guitarist who played with the psychedelic rock band The Electric Prunes.

== Biography ==
=== Early life and career ===
Tulin was born on November 21, 1948, in Philadelphia, to Jewish parents.

In 1965, Tulin played in a band called the Sanctions, which became The Electric Prunes. The band had hit singles with "I Had Too Much To Dream (Last Night)" and "Get Me To The World on Time". In particular the former is regarded by many critics as a defining song of the psychedelic and garage rock music. Tulin continued playing with the band until 1968. Later in 1970 the band split up.

In 1972, "I Had Too Much To Dream (Last Night)" appeared on the Nuggets: Original Artyfacts from the First Psychedelic Era, 1965–1968 compilation. This further raised the profile of The Electric Prunes.

=== Later career ===
In 1999, renewed interest in The Electric Prunes led to a reunion including Tulin. He remained a member until he died in 2011.

Tulin gained much mainstream attention in 2009 when it was announced that he was joining The Smashing Pumpkins front man Billy Corgan in the studio to demo songs for what would become the band's eighth full-length album Teargarden by Kaleidyscope.

Tulin met Billy Corgan in 2008 when the latter was recording music with The Seeds front man Sky Saxon. In an interview with the band's official Web site, Tulin praised these sessions with the band saying they were times of "limitless possibility" and that the new music was "...interesting, innovative, and arresting."

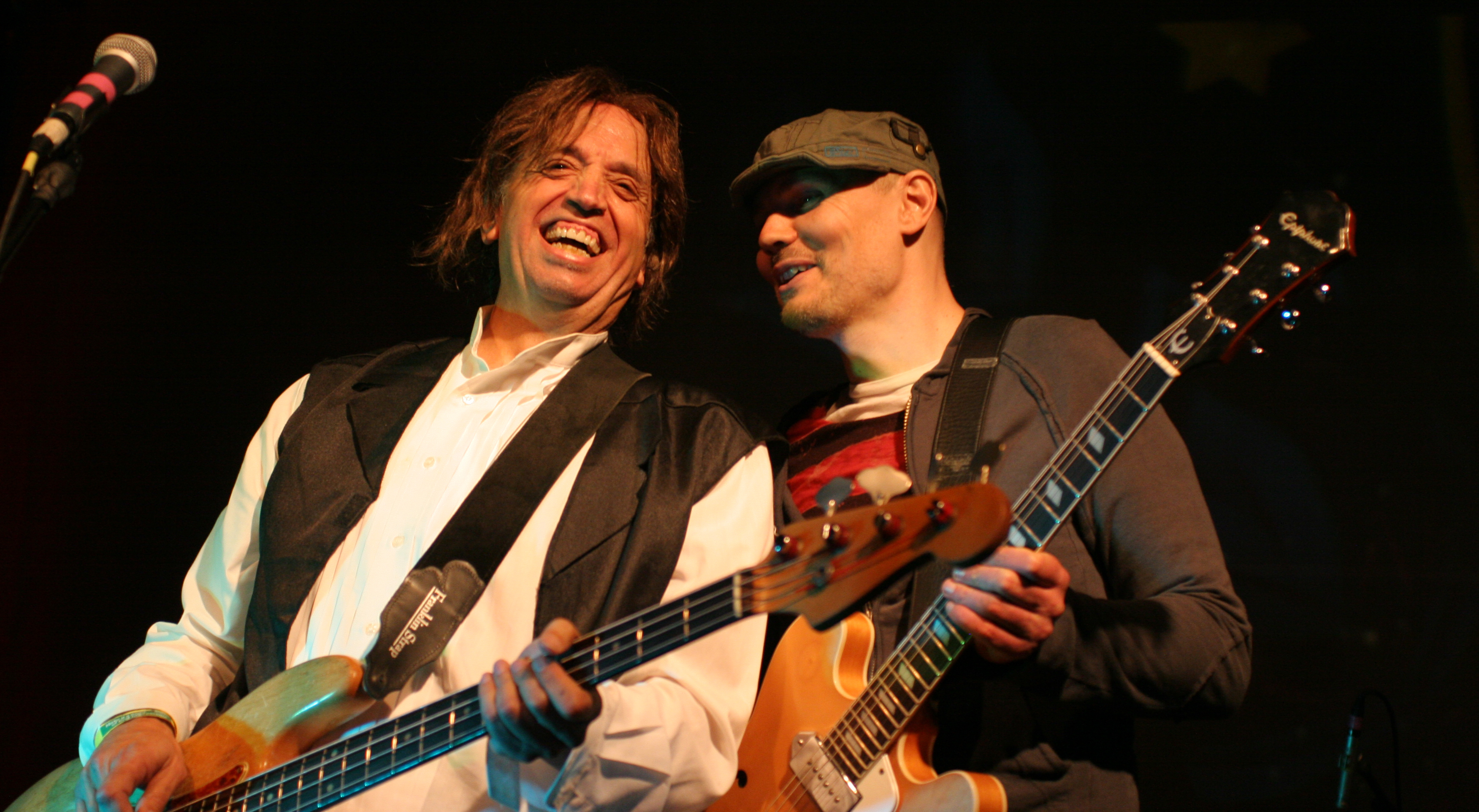
Tulin performs on stage with Billy Corgan at a benefit concert for Sky Saxon.

Following the death of Sky Saxon in June 2009, Tulin took part in Corgan's tribute band Spirits in the Sky which played a show on July 24, 2009.

Following the success of the show, Corgan had the band play a small tour of extremely small venues in California in August 2009. These shows included Jane's Addiction guitarist Dave Navarro on guitar with Corgan, as well as many of The Smashing Pumpkins' longtime collaborators. In November 2009, Tulin played in the band The Backwards Clock Society with Billy Corgan and longtime Smashing Pumpkins collaborator Kerry Brown to raise money for an injured friend of Corgan.

In March 2010, following the departure of Smashing Pumpkins touring bassist Ginger Pooley to raise her newborn infant, Tulin was announced as a temporary live bassist until a permanent replacement could be found. During this time, Tulin played his only full-length show with The Smashing Pumpkins on April 17, 2010, in celebration of Record Store Day. A few days later, Tulin played "Widow Wake My Mind" with the band on The Tonight Show with Jay Leno. In May 2010, the band officially announced Nicole Fiorentino as the newest official member of the band.

In an interview with Ultimate Guitar, Corgan confirmed that Tulin's bass parts were featured on the first EP of Teargarden by Kaleidyscope Volume 1: Songs for a Sailor.

In late 2010, Tulin was recording and performing with The Electric Prunes, who were signed to the independent label Starry Records started by Kerry Brown.

In October 2010, he joined The Icons, aka The Psychedelic Garage Band, a group with other rock veterans. The final edit of the promo video they shot in January 2011 was very nearly completed at the time of his death.

=== Death ===
On February 26, 2011, Tulin collapsed while helping out at the Avalon Underwater Clean-Up in Avalon, California. Baywatch Avalon and Avalon Fire Department medics responded immediately, but he could not be revived and was pronounced dead. He was 62 years old.

== Filmography ==
Year	Title	Role	Notes
1972	The Poseidon Adventure	Bass Guitarist as Ship Sinks	Uncredited, (final film role)
