= Annette (soundtracks) =

2021 soundtrack albums by Sparks

Annette is the 2021 musical romantic drama film directed by Leos Carax, starring Adam Driver and Marion Cotillard. The film featured original music composed by Ron Mael and Russell Mael of Sparks, with lyrics co-written by Carax, and two soundtracks were released for the film. The "Cannes Edition" soundtrack, consisting of 15 songs were released first ahead of the film's Cannes' debut and was preceded by two singles–"So May We Start" and "We Love Each Other So Much". The "Ultimate Edition" soundtrack was released in digitally and as a double CD shortly after and contains virtually all of the music from the film as well as demo music produced for the album.

== Background ==
Ron and Russell initially conceived the script of Annette as a concept album in late-2010, but wanted it to be adapted into videography–feature film, as "We learned since then that movie people really need the physical, typed-out screenplay. But since the piece is pretty much wall-to-wall singing, we were really in a way bypassing the step of there being a screenplay." Much of their music had been developed when they conceptualised it as an album, and Carax asked them to write few more songs, including "Girl from the Middle of Nowhere" and "Sympathy for the Abyss" which were written for the film.

While initially planning as a stage production, Ron wanted to conduct the orchestra, Russell intended to play Henry McHenry (Driver's character) and opera singer Rebecca Sjöwall providing soprano vocals and serve as the female vocalist, adding that "the origin of it really was that they enjoyed doing the Ingmar Bergman project, but there were so many characters involved in order to be able to tour with that that we wanted to have a piece that had fewer featured performers. So it was working backwards in a certain way." Once the script was adapted into a film, they decided to play cameos over lead parts, giving the roles to Driver and Cotillard which would help the theatrical prospects. For the puppet, Carax had used a real girl for vocals, though Ron and Russell did not intend to, but appreciated the idea.

Carax wanted their actors to sing live for the film, despite not being trained, even though Cotillard and Driver had sung in previous film roles and the former had a musical career outside film. This led Ron and Russell impressed with their musical approach. Speaking to Simon Thompson of Forbes, Ron opined: "I think it is more fun, but not necessarily that we're molding them, but naturally, they're more in keeping with the stylistic approach that we prefer for a movie musical." Ron did not feel it as an artifice of mimicking Broadway performers or reality show talents (such as American Idol), and not that "they are unable to convey exactly the right sort of tone through what they were projecting vocally in the film; it's authentic. They knew what the material was, so they worked to fit their vocals within those musical pieces."

The sound of the film varies from wide range of songse with each scene, as Russell and Carax wanted "the music doesn't necessarily all have to be consistent, stylistically. It can be things that sound a bit more like a band. But then there's songs that are more orchestrated, and ones that sound a bit more classical, and ones where the dialogue is being conveyed in a more sung-spoken sort of way", which became one of the trademarks of the film, which refers to "the music is kind of all over the map in a certain way." He further opined that pop music has a certain form, adding "They're three and a half minute songs in a general way, but that within that format, you should always be an artist trying to push the boundaries of what you can actually do within that three or three and a half minute form. And so we've kind of always taken a bit of pride in trying to push ourselves and challenge ourselves to find new ways to experiment within the form."

Russell appreciated the visualization of the two-dimensional versions in the album, citing two of the scenes. He said "A scene like this crazed waltz that the character Henry suggests they do aboard the ship during the storm, that was in our original version, but the way Leos brought it to life was beautiful and surprising in a great way to us. There had been some discussion of what would be the best way to shoot that scene, and whether it should be done on a real ocean in a real boat, or on a soundstage in a more artificial way [as in the end result]. The scene when Henry and the baby Annette wash up onto the island almost looks like a theater piece, done incredibly well."

== Annette (Cannes Edition) ==
Annette (Cannes Edition – Selections from the Motion Picture Soundtrack)

Soundtrack album by Sparks
- Released: 2 July 2021
- Studios: Air; L'Obsidienne; Dada; Studios Ferber
- Genres: Rock opera; art rock; glam rock; baroque pop
- Length: 40:52
- Label: Sony
- Producers: Ron Mael; Russell Mael

Sparks chronology
A Steady Drip, Drip, Drip (2020)	Annette (Cannes Edition) (2021)	Annette (Unlimited Edition) (2021)

Singles from Annette (Cannes Edition – Selections from the Motion Picture Soundtrack)
- 1. "So May We Start" Released: 31 May 2021; 2. "We Love Each Other So Much" Released: 21 June 2021

Annette (Cannes Edition – Selections from the Motion Picture Soundtrack) is the first soundtrack album released for the film, on 2 July 2021 by Sony Music Entertainment France. The album was promotional release for the film, to commemorate its Cannes premiere as the first film in the 2021 edition, followed by the theatrical release in France. It consists of 15 tracks from the original music composed by Sparks, and features performances from the cast members. The album was distributed by Milan Records for the United States release on 23 July 2021 and further saw a CD release on 30 July 2021, with a vinyl edition of the album releasing on 3 September.

Reviewing for the album, Steve Krakow of Chicago Reader commented that the Sparks "continue their renaissance with the soundtrack". Darryl Sterdan of Tinnitist wrote that "The Mael brothers go Hollywood with this sophisticated, star-studded soundtrack". Ad Amorossi of Flood Magazine wrote "Annette comes across as successfully as it does—with caustic, dry-icy wit at the peak of its stagey reality cop-and-court drama—comes down to each of its parts interlocking, a soundtrack bound to its weird and torrid tale, and a mesmerizing cinematic display that would be nothing without a Mael song."

=== Singles ===
==== "So May We Start" ====
The album's first single track was named "So May We Start", released on 31 May 2021. The video form of that song was released on 9 July. Russell wanted the song opening the film that was "both kind of in the film and outside in a way where the actors, the directors, the writers, would all be commenting on the fears and difficulties of actually making this particular production". The song was one of the initial music, that was not changed in the script, as Russell said "We always had that idea from the beginning, where we wanted the characters outside of their roles, in street clothing, and musically, it was comfortable for us to come up with. Leos embraced that idea and anything that was off-kilter in presenting a movie musical in this day and age."

Russell in an interview to The Hollywood Reporter had said that the song also became "a de facto anthem" for the 2021 Cannes Film Festival, which opened in venue on France nearly a year, as the COVID-19 pandemic led the 2020 edition to be cancelled; he added "there was an optimism about the pandemic situation. So to have a song [in] the spirit of 'So May We Start,' it was kind of like "so may we start ... cinema getting back together again, the way it should be seen on a big screen in front of a lot of people.'"

==== "We Love Each Other So Much" ====
The second single accompanied the soundtrack, "We Love Each Other So Much" was released on 21 June 2021 (World Music Day). The song is a duet sung by Driver and Cotillard, depicting the romantic relationship between those characters. A demo version of this song is performed by Rebecca Sjöwall, featured in the extended soundtrack.

=== Track listing ===
All tracks are written by Sparks and Leos Carax.

No.	Title	Artist(s)	Length
1.	"So May We Start"	Sparks; Adam Driver; Marion Cotillard; Simon Helberg	3:44
2.	"True Love Always Finds a Way"	Sparks; Cotillard	1:25
3.	"We Love Each Other So Much"	Driver; Cotillard	3:32
4.	"I'm an Accompanist"	Helberg	1:24
5.	"Aria (The Forest)"	Cotillard; Catherine Trottmann	3:17
6.	"She's Out of This World!"	Sparks; Driver; Cotillard	2:23
7.	"Six Women Have Come Forward"	Sparks; Six Women	2:03
8.	"You Used to Laugh"	Sparks; Driver	2:13
9.	"Girl from the Middle of Nowhere"	Cotillard	2:57
10.	"Let's Waltz in the Storm!"	Driver; Cotillard	3:33
11.	"We've Washed Ashore / Baby Aria (The Moon) / I Will Haunt You, Henry"	Driver; Hebe Griffiths; Cotillard; Trottmann	4:49
12.	"Premiere Performance of Baby Annette"	Driver; Wim Opbrouck	2:13
13.	"All the Girls"	Driver	1:19
14.	"Stepping Back in Time"	Driver; Cotillard; Trottmann	2:04
15.	"Sympathy for the Abyss"	Driver; Devyn McDowell	3:51
Total length:			40:52

=== Charts ===
Chart (2021)	Peak position
Belgian Albums (Ultratop Wallonia)	68
French Albums (SNEP)	72
German Albums (Offizielle Top 100)	90
Scottish Albums (Official Charts)	32
UK Soundtrack Albums (Official Charts)	2

== Annette (Unlimited Edition) ==
Annette (Unlimited Edition – Original Motion Picture Soundtrack)

Soundtrack album by Sparks
- Released: 5 November 2021
- Studios: Air; L'Obsidienne; Dada; Studios Ferber
- Genres: Rock opera; art rock; glam rock; baroque pop
- Length: 111:23
- Label: Sony
- Producers: Ron Mael; Russell Mael

Sparks chronology
Annette (Cannes Edition) (2021)	Annette (Unlimited Edition) (2021)	The Sparks Brothers (2022)

Annette (Unlimited Edition – Original Motion Picture Soundtrack) is the extended edition of the soundtrack album released digitally on 5 November 2021. The album consisted of nearly 57 tracks of the original music featured in full in the film, and six demo tracks being produced for the album. It was released in double-disc formats on 25 November.

=== Track listing ===
All tracks are written by Sparks and Leos Carax.

Disc one
No.	Title	Artist(s)	Length
1.	"So May We Start"	Sparks; Driver; Cotillard; Helberg; Chorus Girls and Boys	3:53
2.	"True Love Always Finds a Way"	Cotillard; Trinity Boys Choir	1:24
3.	"How 'bout a Smile, Ann?"	Sparks	0:43
4.	"We Love Each Other So Much"	Driver; Cotillard	3:39
5.	"Show Biz News (Tied the Knot)"	Rebecca Sjöwall	0:20
6.	"I'm an Accompanist"	Helberg	1:24
7.	"Forest Intro / Aria (The Forest)"	Cotillard; Trottmann	3:39
8.	"Finale"	Sparks; Cotillard; Trottmann	1:30
9.	"Show Biz News (New Born Girl)"	Sjöwall	0:22
10.	"She's Out of This World!"	Sparks; Driver; Cotillard	2:22
11.	"Calm Before the Opera"	Trinity Boys	1:24
12.	"Six Women Have Come Forward (Film Version)"	Six Women	2:14
13.	"You Used to Laugh"	Sparks; Driver	2:13
14.	"Girl from the Middle of Nowhere"	Sparks; Cotillard	3:04
15.	"Lalalala"	Cotillard	1:21
16.	"My Star's in Decline"	Driver	0:33
17.	"Show Biz News (Respective Success)"	Sjöwall	0:32
18.	"Lullaby for Annette"	Cotillard; Trottmann	2:30
19.	"Let's Waltz in the Storm!"	Driver; Cotillard	3:32
20.	"We've Washed Ashore"	Driver; Cotillard	1:43
21.	"Baby Aria (The Moon)"	Driver; Griffith	1:11
22.	"I Will Haunt You, Henry"	Cotillard; Trottmann	1:53
23.	"We Are the Police"	Sparks; Driver	1:22
24.	"I'm a Good Father"	Sparks; Driver	1:50
25.	"Baby Aria (She's a Miracle)"	Driver; Griffith	1:12
26.	"The Conductor"	Helberg	2:49
27.	"Something That Will Blow Your Mind / Baby Aria (Can You Explain It?) / It's Not Really Exploitation"	Driver; Helberg; Griffith	3:03
28.	"Every Night the Same Dream"	Driver	2:42
Total length:			54:23

Disc two
No.	Title	Artist(s)	Length
1.	"Premiere Performance of Baby Annette"	Driver; Opbrouck	2:13
2.	"Baby Aria (First Performance)"	Sparks; Griffith	2:14
3.	"We Love Annette!"	Sparks; Driver; Helberg; Griffith	2:01
4.	"We Love Each Other So Much (Lullaby)"	Sparks; Helberg	1:56
5.	"All the Girls"	Sparks; Driver; Russian and Japanese Girls	1:18
6.	"So Glad to Be Back at Home / We Love Each Other So Much (Annette) / You Had No Right!"	Sparks; Driver; Helberg; Griffith; Trottman	3:35
7.	"Murder of a Conductor"	Sparks; Driver; Helberg	3:04
8.	"Show Biz News (Never Again)"	Sjöwall	0:35
9.	"Hyper Bowl"	Sparks; Colin Lainchbury Brown; McDowell	4:08
10.	"True Love Always Finds a Way (Reprise)"	Sparks; Driver; Trinity Boys	0:47
11.	"He Is a Murderer!"	Sparks	1:34
12.	"Stepping Back in Time"	Driver; Cotillard; Trottman	1:59
13.	"Courtroom Spirit"	Cotillard; Trottman	0:38
14.	"Abyss Intro"	Sparks; Driver; McDowell	2:29
15.	"Sympathy for the Abyss (Film Version)"	Sparks; Driver; McDowell; Kamary Phillips	5:53
16.	"The Lamp"	Sparks	0:52
17.	"We Love Each Other So Much – End Theme"	Sparks	2:40
18.	"It's the End"	Sparks; Cast	2:31
19.	"Intro to Henry's Show (A)"	Sparks; Driver; Geoffrey Carey	1:25
20.	"The Zygomatic Rap"	Driver	0:19
21.	"Laugh, Laugh, Laugh (A)"	Driver; Chorus Girls	1:01
22.	"Ok, Ready, Laugh!"	Driver	0:29
23.	"So Why Did I Become a Comedian?"	Driver	0:34
24.	"So Why Did You Become a Comedian?"	Driver	1:12
25.	"Introspective (A)"	Driver; Cotillard; Trottman	2:31
26.	"Opera Bows"	Driver; Chorus Girls	0:52
27.	"Laugh, Laugh, Laugh (B)"	Driver; Chorus Girls	1:20
28.	"Intro to Henry's Show (B)"	Alberto Chromatico	0:57
29.	"Introspective (B)"	Driver	1:44
30.	"We Love Each Other So Much (First Demo)"	Sjöwall	3:08
31.	"Worth Her Weight in Gold (Demo)"	Sparks	3:27
32.	"You Used to Laugh (Demo)"	Sparks	2:56
33.	"This Is a Baby"	Sparks	1:22
34.	"Is She Legitimate? (Demo)"	Sjöwall	1:33
35.	"Upstaged (Demo)"	Sparks	2:36
Total length:			67:50

== Accolades ==
Award	Date of ceremony	Category	Recipient(s)	Result	Ref.
Cannes Film Festival	6–17 July 2021	Cannes Soundtrack Award	Ron Mael and Russell Mael	Won	
Chicago Film Critics Association	15 December 2021	Best Original Score	Ron Mael and Russell Mael	Nominated	
Florida Film Critics Circle	21 December 2021	Best Score	Ron Mael and Russell Mael	Nominated	
Lumière Awards	17 January 2022	Best Music	Ron Mael and Russell Mael	Won	
Chlotrudis Awards	21 February 2022	Best Music in a Film	Ron Mael and Russell Mael	Nominated	
César Awards	25 February 2022	Best Original Music	Ron Mael and Russell Mael	Won	

== Annette – An Opera by Sparks (The Original 2013 Recordings) ==
Annette – An Opera by Sparks (The Original 2013 Recordings)

Recording by Sparks
- Released: 25 October 2024
- Recorded: 2012–2013
- Studio: Sparks Studios
- Label: Lil' Beethoven
- Producers: Ron Mael; Russell Mael

Sparks chronology
The Girl Is Crying in Her Latte (2023)	Annette – An Opera by Sparks (The Original 2013 Recordings) (2024)	Mad! (2025)

In 2024, Sparks released the original recordings for Annette on vinyl as a limited triple LP box set on their label Lil' Beethoven Records.

=== Track listing ===
All tracks are written by Ron Mael and Russell Mael.

Side A
No.	Title	Length
1.	"So May We Start"	2:48
2.	"True Love Always Finds a Way"	2:13
3.	"(I Got a Lot in Common with) Dostoevsky, Part 1"	4:13
4.	"Girls Love a Man Who Makes Them Laugh"	3:11
5.	"Show Biz News 1 – Romance Rumours"	0:41
6.	"We Love Each Other So Much"	3:07
7.	"I'm an Accompanist"	1:27
8.	"Ann's Aria"	2:33
9.	"Show Biz News 2 – Tied the Knot"	0:41

Side B
No.	Title	Length
10.	"True Love Always (One Star Rising, One in Decline)"	1:44
11.	"Show Biz News 3 – Baby News"	0:41
12.	"(I Got a Lot in Common with) Dostoevsky, Part 2"	2:29
13.	"You Used to Laugh"	3:34
14.	"Show Biz News 4 – Trouble in Marriage"	0:40
15.	"My Star's in Decline"	3:18
16.	"Show Biz News 5 – Marriage Reconciliation Attempt"	0:40
17.	"Turbulent Sea (Ann's Murder)"	3:42
18.	"Show Biz News 6 – Yacht Gone Missing"	0:41

Side C
No.	Title	Length
19.	"We've Washed Ashore / Annette's Aria / I Will Haunt You, Henry"	5:51
20.	"Show Biz News 7 – Shipwreck Tragedy"	0:39
21.	"We Are the Police"	1:46
22.	"I'm a Good Father"	2:54
23.	"This Is a Baby"	2:34
24.	"The Conductor"	4:00

Side D
No.	Title	Length
25.	"It's Not Really Exploitation"	4:39
26.	"Show Biz News 8 – Annette's First Concert Tour"	0:40
27.	"Baby Annette Tour Ad"	1:02
28.	"The Premiere Performance of Baby Annette"	4:51
29.	"Annette on the Nighty Night Show"	3:47
30.	"Is She Legitimate (Experts on TV Show)"	2:23
31.	"I Have the Same Dream Every Night / I Will Haunt You, Henry"	3:15

Side E
No.	Title	Length
32.	"Baby Annette International Tour Ad"	1:03
33.	"We Love Annette (Traveling Around the World)"	4:44
34.	"All the Girls"	1:55
35.	"Show Biz News 9 – End of Successful Tour"	0:40
36.	"All the Girls (Reprise)"	0:23
37.	"Murder of Conductor, Part 1"	4:23
38.	"Murder of Conductor, Part 2"	3:01
39.	"I Have the Same Dream (Reprise)"	1:16
40.	"Show Biz News 10 – Superbowl Announcement"	0:41

Side F
No.	Title	Length
41.	"Annette's Superbowl Performance"	3:10
42.	"He Is a Murderer"	2:14
43.	"Too Operatic" (feat. Rebecca Sjöwall)	3:04
44.	"True Love Always Finds a Way (End Version)"	1:45
45.	"Stepping Back in Time"	2:47
46.	"It's the End"	1:27
