= A Steady Drip, Drip, Drip =

Studio album by Sparks
- Released: May 15, 2020
- Studios: Sparks (Los Angeles, California)
- Genres: Art pop; glam rock; baroque pop
- Length: 54:26
- Label: BMG
- Producers: Ron Mael; Russell Mael

Sparks chronology
Hippopotamus (2017)	A Steady Drip, Drip, Drip (2020)	Annette (Cannes Edition) (2021)

Singles from A Steady Drip, Drip, Drip
- 1. "Please Don't Fuck Up My World" Released: December 16, 2019; 2. "Self-Effacing" Released: February 19, 2020; 3. "I'm Toast" Released: March 13, 2020; 4. "One for the Ages" Released: March 27, 2020

A Steady Drip, Drip, Drip is the 24th studio album by American rock and pop duo Sparks. Recorded in gaps between Sparks' film projects, the album uses a full rock-group format to draw on the band's full range of musical styles and was universally acclaimed by critics, who praised both its lyrical and melodic content.

The album's digital release on May 15, 2020, through BMG Rights Management entered the UK iTunes chart at number 8 – also charting in the US, Germany, France and Canada – and the UK Official Album Downloads Chart Top 100 at no. 13.

The release of the physical formats was delayed because of the COVID-19 pandemic and only followed on July 3, 2020. Accompanied by the YouTube premiere of a Cyriak Harris music video for the song "The Existential Threat", the physical release saw A Steady Drip, Drip, Drip enter the UK charts at number 7, making this the group's second consecutive UK Top 10 studio album and their fourth overall. The album also made the Billboard 200 list of the top albums in the US, the first time Sparks has had a hit album in America since In Outer Space in 1983.

== Background ==
Following the 2017 release of Hippopotamus, Sparks toured, continued their work as screenwriters and composers for the upcoming musical Annette starring Adam Driver and participated in a documentary about their career directed by Edgar Wright.

Even so, as Sparks' keyboard player Ron Mael told Forbes' David Chiu, there were gaps in their schedule allowing A Steady Drip, Drip, Drip to be written and recorded: "We had been working so long on the Annette film, and there was a time when there was kind of a lull while they were sorting out just different business sides of the film. Rather than just sit around and wait, we kind of were anxious to get back and record individual discrete songs [...] the material just seemed to kind of come fairly easily this time around."

== Style ==
Like Hippopotamus, the studio album preceding it, A Steady Drip, Drip, Drip uses a full rock-group format. Described by Randall Roberts in the Los Angeles Times as "contemporary, electronically driven art-pop", the album reflects Sparks' traditional stylistic versatility encompassing "pop, rock, New Wave, synth-pop, disco, dance, electro, orchestral, opera" while prominently featuring Russell Mael's layered vocals, accompanied by rocky guitars and drums.

Russell Mael, speaking to The Quietus, said "A Steady Drip, Drip, Drip is a good introduction to Sparks [...] it's one of those albums that's all over the map sonically, and lyrically it's really kind of uncompromising too. It's not timid in any way." The album was noted for its multiple occurrences of the word "fuck", which is somewhat unusual in Sparks' catalogue – the Los Angeles Times quoted Ron Mael quipping, "We held off for 23 albums". (Note: The song "The Angels" on the Sparks album Balls previously used the word "fucking".)

Lyrically, the songs' content is described by David Cheal in the Financial Times as "funny, clever, arch, wry, dry, witty, smart, strange, and, at times, actually rather moving". Louder Than War's Tim Cooper likened Ron Mael's writing to that of Cole Porter or Ivor Novello, "employing wit in the form of puns and metaphors, yet his subject matter and his concerns are always contemporary; never more so than on 'iPhone', a song whose chorus is something we can all empathise with: 'Put your fucking iPhone down and listen to me.'"

The album's closing track "Please Don't Fuck Up My World", described by AllMusic's Heather Phares as a "poignant ecological plea" that "manage[s] to use a children's choir to non-cloying effect", is also unusual in Sparks' body of work for having an overt political message. A number of other song lyrics, featuring phrases such as "All interaction's now suspended" and "Threat outside, let me hide, just until the danger passes, then I'll go outside ... the Existential Threat is at your patio door and do not let it in", recorded before the onset of the COVID-19 pandemic, appeared eerily prescient in retrospect.

== Release ==
Originally scheduled for a May 15, 2020 release date, only the digital version of the album was released on that date, with the physical formats (picture disc vinyl, CD, coloured vinyl) pushed back until July 3, 2020, due to the COVID-19 pandemic. Interestingly, the vinyl edition requires the listener to play the disc at 45 RPM despite the album being a 12" double record set. Coinciding with the physical release of the album, an official music video for the song "The Existential Threat" premiered on YouTube, the animation created by English freelance animator and composer Cyriak Harris.

== Reception ==
Professional ratings
Aggregate scores
Source	Rating
AnyDecentMusic?	8.1/10
Metacritic	82/100
Review scores
Source	Rating
AllMusic	4/5 stars
American Songwriter	4/5 stars
Clash	9/10
Exclaim!	9/10
Financial Times	4/5 stars
The Irish Times	4/5 stars
musicOMH	4/5 stars
The Telegraph	4/5 stars
The Times	4/5 stars
Uncut	9/10

A Steady Drip, Drip, Drip has a score of 82 out of 100 on review aggregator website Metacritic, based on 16 reviews, indicating "universal acclaim". Mat Smith writing in Clash magazine characterized it as "classic Sparks moments, full of comedy, clever wordplay, deft explorations of all the myriad issues of the world, with arrangements that sound as current and fresh as a dew-soaked spring daisy." Audio and music publication MusicnGear stated that the album "could very well re-ignite the imagination you had as a child; and remind you of the full unbridled freedom that can come with creativity."

Following its digital release, the album entered the UK iTunes chart at number 8, as well as the iTunes charts of France, Canada, the US and Germany at numbers 19, 32, 44 and 47 respectively. It entered the UK Official Album Downloads Chart Top 100 at number 13, and subsequently entered the UK Top 10 at number 7 when the physical formats were released in July 2020, thus repeating the UK chart performance of its predecessor, Hippopotamus. In addition, the album took the number 1 spot in the UK Official Independent Albums Chart.

== Track listing ==
All tracks are written by Ron and Russell Mael.

No.	Title	Length
1.	"All That"	4:44
2.	"I'm Toast"	3:32
3.	"Lawnmower"	3:39
4.	"Sainthood Is Not in Your Future"	4:13
5.	"Pacific Standard Time"	4:23
6.	"Stravinsky's Only Hit"	4:10
7.	"Left Out in the Cold"	4:18
8.	"Self-Effacing"	3:42
9.	"One for the Ages"	3:49
10.	"Onomato Pia"	2:52
11.	"iPhone"	4:01
12.	"The Existential Threat"	3:24
13.	"Nothing Travels Faster Than the Speed of Light"	4:25
14.	"Please Don't Fuck Up My World"	3:14
Total length:		54:19

== Personnel ==
Credits are adapted from the CD liner notes.

=== Sparks ===
- Ron Mael – keyboards, programming, production
- Russell Mael – vocals, production, engineering, mixing

=== Additional contributors ===
- Stevie Nistor – drums
- Evan Weiss – guitars
- Eli Pearl – guitars
- Patrick Kelly – bass
- Ryan Parrish – saxophone ("All That", "The Existential Threat")
- Alex Casnoff – additional keyboards ("One for the Ages")
- Coldwater Canyon Youth Choir – additional vocals ("Please Don't Fuck Up My World")
- Bill Inglot – mastering at d2 Mastering, Los Angeles
- Dave Schultz – mastering at d2 Mastering, Los Angeles
- Galen Johnson – cover design and artwork
- Anna Webber – photography
- Rachel Gutek – package design

== Charts ==
Chart performance for A Steady Drip, Drip, Drip
Chart (2020)	Peak position
Austrian Albums (Ö3 Austria)	29
Belgian Albums (Ultratop Wallonia)	103
Dutch Albums (Album Top 100)	88
French Albums (SNEP)	159
German Albums (Offizielle Top 100)	24
Scottish Albums (Official Charts)	2
Swiss Albums (Schweizer Hitparade)	25
UK Albums (Official Charts)	7
UK Independent Albums (Official Charts)	1
US Top Album Sales (Billboard)	75
