= Rebecca Sjöwall =

American opera singer

Rebecca Sjöwall (born September 7, 1977) is an American singer and recording artist.

== Biography ==
Born in Wisconsin, Sjöwall has a B.A. in Political Science from Luther College and a Master's Degree in Vocal Performance from UCLA She is a two-time District Winner in the Metropolitan Opera National Council Auditions and was a Studio Artist with Arizona Opera from 2010-2012.

== Career ==
In 2007, Sjöwall won the American Jenny Lind competition sponsored by the Barnum Festival and in cooperation with the Royal Swedish Academy of Music, which led to a concert tour of Sweden. In 2008, she made her professional debut as Micaëla in a West Bay Opera staging of Carmen. She has since appeared with Arizona Opera, Nashville Opera, Opera Idaho, San Francisco Lyric Opera, Festival Opera of Walnut Creek, Pacific Opera Project, and the Sacramento Philharmonic and Opera.

She has performed a variety of roles, including Violetta in La traviata, Contessa Almaviva in The Marriage of Figaro, Pamina in The Magic Flute, Gilda in Rigoletto, Liù in Turandot, the Governess in The Turn of the Screw, Mrs. P in The Man Who Mistook His Wife for a Hat, and Older Alyce in Glory Denied. She also created the role of Anna Roosevelt Boettiger in the world premiere performances of The First Lady, an opera depicting the days following Franklin D. Roosevelt's death and most recently created the role of Professor Elyn Saks in the world premiere of The Center Cannot Hold, based on the book of the same title.

Naxos released a studio recording of Michael Nyman's The Man Who Mistook His Wife for a Hat, featuring Sjöwall, Matthew Treviño, and Ryan MacPherson with Dean Williamson conducting the Nashville Opera Orchestra on September 9, 2016. The album was recorded at Ocean Way Nashville, located in the heart of Nashville's Music Row.

In 2019, Sjöwall performed the world premiere of a new musical work for soprano, narrator, and piano entitled Mother's Word. Through monologue and song, Mother's Word focuses on the untold stories of mothers from the Bible, including Eve, Hagar, Sarah, Rebekah, Leah, Naomi, Ruth, Bathsheba, Elizabeth, and Mary, with text written by Marian Partee and music by Christina Whitten Thomas. The premiere took place at La Cañada Presbyterian Church and featured Sjöwall with pianist Aiko Fukushima and director/narrator Tina Tong.

Sjöwall is also an active recording artist and member of The Recording Academy. She is the singer of the "Rapture Anthem" on the popular video game BioShock and has collaborated on several projects with Sparks.

In 2009, Sjöwall was part of the singing cast for the radio musical The Seduction of Ingmar Bergman by Sparks, which premiered on Sveriges Radio and was later released on vinyl and CD. Andy Gill in The Independent gave The Seduction of Ingmar Bergman a maximum rating of 5 stars and included the record among his 20 albums of the year. The world premiere of the live musical took place on June 25, 2011, at the John Anson Ford Amphitheatre in Hollywood. It was hosted by the Los Angeles Film Festival and starred Sparks, Guy Maddin, Peter Franzén as Bergman, Tammy Glover recreating her role as the Hollywood Welcoming Committee, Sjöwall reprising her role as the Hollywood starlet, and Ann Magnuson as Greta Garbo.

Sjöwall appears on the final track of Sparks' album Hippopotamus, which was released by BMG Records on September 8, 2017, and entered the U.K. Album Charts at No. 7.

In the 2021 film Annette, featuring story and music by Sparks, Sjöwall portrays the voice of Connie O'Connor. The film was directed by Leos Carax and stars Adam Driver, Marion Cotillard, and Simon Helberg. Sjöwall is also credited with additional voices in the film and on the Cannes Edition (Selections from the Motion Picture) Soundtrack.

Also in 2021, Sjöwall is the featured score vocalist in Barb and Star Go to Vista Del Mar, a film starring Kristen Wiig, Annie Mumolo, and Jamie Dornan. The score was written by Christopher Lennertz and Dara Taylor.

== Reception ==
Of Sjöwall's appearance as Micaëla (Carmen), the San Francisco Classical Voice wrote, "she lit up the proceedings with glowing, sweet tone and a radiant persona, which rightfully reaped some of the longest applause of the evening." Her 2009 performance as Gilda in Rigoletto was judged to show "real promise" with an "impressive high E-flat". In addition, her performance in Turandot was lauded as a "lovely and limpid Liù" that was "deeply affecting."

After her role debut with Nashville Opera as Mrs. P in Michael Nyman's The Man Who Mistook His Wife for a Hat, ArtsNash declared, "Her climactic singing scream of 'Philistine!' at Dr. S is one of the most electrifying moments I've experienced in more than 40 years of attending live opera and theater performances."

As Older Alyce in Tom Cipullo's Glory Denied with Nashville Opera, "We are lucky to have a singer with so clear a vocal affinity to new music as Rebecca Sjöwall. Her voice just takes to it so easily, I forget she’s singing. That's not just because of her several patter passages in Glory Denied, but the natural ease in her vocal precision and her voice' richness give a relatable life to the character. She made me feel for Alyce in a way that the set-up of the narrative discourages." - Tracy Monaghan, Schmopera

== Roles ==
- Alice Ford in Verdi's Falstaff
- Amore in Gluck's Orfeo ed Euridice
- Anna Roosevelt in Kenneth Wells' The First Lady (world premiere)
- Contessa Almaviva in Mozart's Le nozze di Figaro
- Edith in Gilbert and Sullivan's The Pirates of Penzance
- Micaëla and Frasquita in Bizet's Carmen
- Gilda in Verdi's Rigoletto
- Governess in Britten's The Turn of the Screw
- Gretel in Humperdinck's Hänsel und Gretel
- Helena in Britten's A Midsummer Night's Dream
- High Priestess in Verdi's Aida
- Inez in Verdi's Il trovatore
- Kate Pinkerton in Puccini's Madama Butterfly
- La Marchesa in Verdi's Un giorno di regno
- Liù in Puccini's Turandot
- Lucy in Menotti's The Telephone
- Lucy Brown in Weill's The Threepenny Opera
- Marguerite in Auber's Manon Lescaut
- Mimì in Puccini's La bohème
- Mrs. P in Michael Nyman's The Man Who Mistook His Wife for a Hat
- Older Alyce in Tom Cipullo's Glory Denied
- Pamina in Mozart's Die Zauberflöte
- Professor Elyn Saks in Kenneth Wells' The Center Cannot Hold (world premiere)
- Rosalinde in Strauss' Die Fledermaus
- Violetta in Verdi's La traviata
- Williamson girl in David Lang's the difficulty of crossing a field

== Discography ==
- Hollywood Starlet - The Seduction of Ingmar Bergman by Sparks (2009)
- Guest Artist - I Am Rapture - Rapture Is Me (BioShock Official Score) (2010)
- Mrs. P - Michael Nyman's The Man Who Mistook His Wife for a Hat (Naxos) (2016)
- Guest Artist - Hippopotamus by Sparks (2017)
- Featured Score Vocalist - Barb and Star Go to Vista Del Mar (Original Motion Picture Soundtrack) (2021)
- Connie O'Connor & Additional Voices - Annette (Cannes Edition - Selections from the Motion Picture Soundtrack) (2021)
- Ann, Annette, Connie O’Connor & Additional Voices - Annette (Unlimited Edition) (2021)
- Ann, Annette, Connie O’Connor & Additional Voices - Annette - An Opera By Sparks (The Original 2013 Recordings) (2024)
