= Yasin Islek =

German-Turkish actor and model (born 1988)

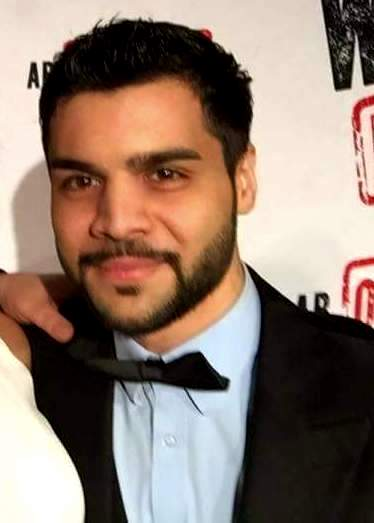
- Islek in 2015
- Born: February 8, 1988 (age 38); Solingen, Germany
- Occupation: Actor
- Height: 172
- Website: https://www.yasin-islek.com

Yasin Islek (Turkish written: Yasin İşlek) (born February 8, 1988, in Solingen, Germany) is a German-Turkish actor and model.

== Life ==
Yasin Islek is a German-Turkish actor, model, and coach. He graduated in 2011 as a media agent (artists, management, marketing, and events). After his first apprenticeship, he completed acting school at the Filmactingschool Düsseldorf in Düsseldorf (SSA) in 2015. Yasin speaks four languages: English, German, Turkish, and Spanish. He is also the CEO of the Artisdo Agency.

Even as a child, Islek shot sketches in front of the camera. Islek made his first touch with acting at the middle school in 2003.His first professional experience in 2004 was when he played a supporting role in Shakespeare's The Tempest. In August 2010, on the set of The Crocodiles: All for One, he made his first cinematic experience his final decision to become an actor. Since then, he has been active in various cinema and TV productions. For example, at the famous German series Alarm for Cobra 11 in Cologne or beside Adam Driver, Marion Cotillard, and Simon Helberg in Annette. Since 2018 Islek has been one of the main cast of Sketchcomedy-Series JokeRS Comedy, besides to Eddy Cheaib and Caroline Pharo.

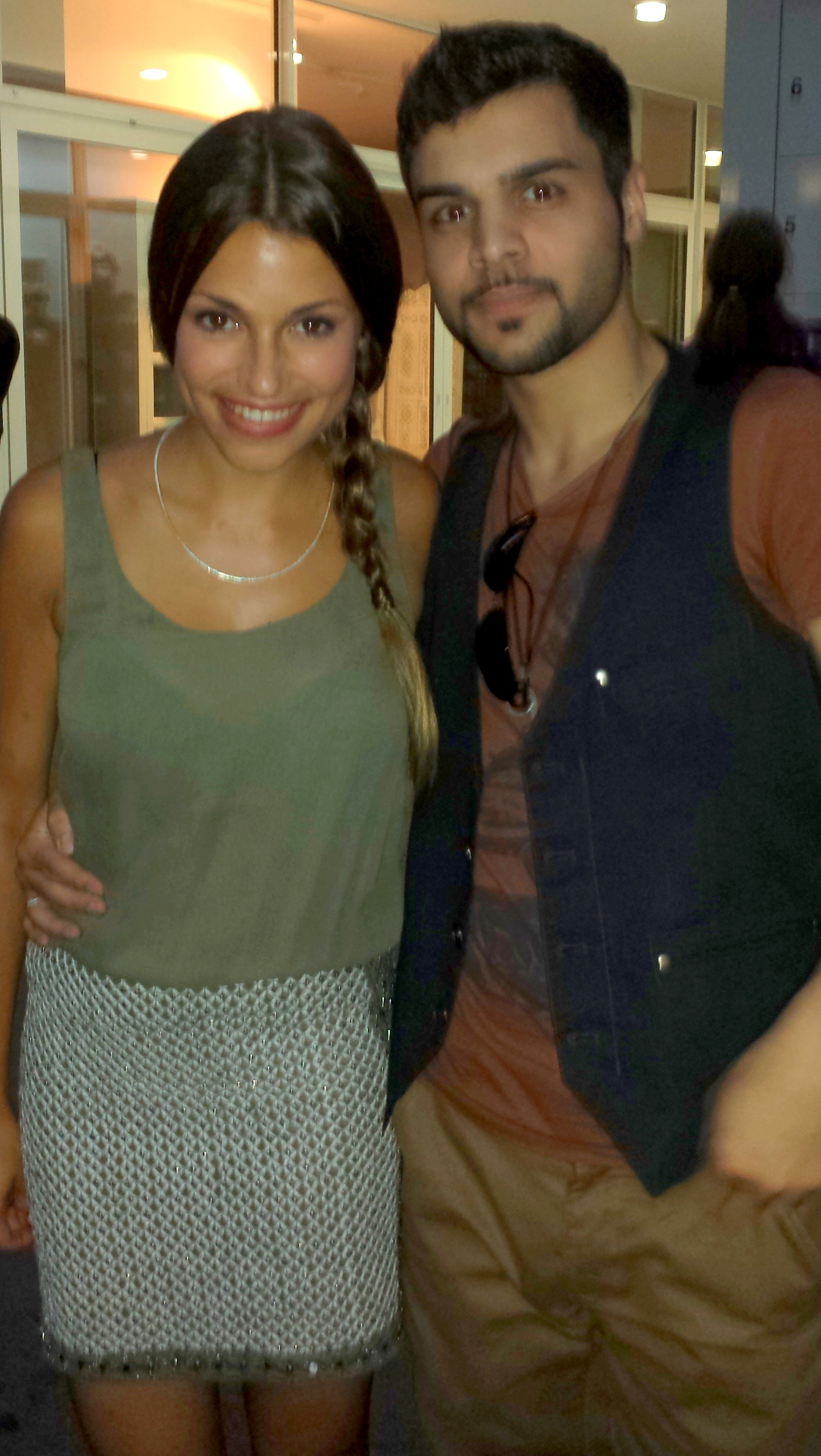
Yasin Islek with Anna Julia Kapfelsperger at the „Alarm for Cobra 11“ Set (2013)

Islek started modeling with a contest in a shopping mall (with jury member Topmodel Jana Ina Zarrella). His first professional experience as a model was at this contest, which consisted of a photo shoot and a fashion show. He won the second place in the finals. Since then, he has had various shoots, image films and fashion shows for brands and boutiques such as Jack&Jones, s.Oliver, Adidas, Emilio Adani and many others.

== Filmography ==
- 2010: The Crocodiles: All for One
- 2011: Indisch für Anfänger
- 2012: Danni Lowinski (Season 3 - Episode "Nazi")
- 2013: 300 Worte Deutsch
- 2013: ZDFneo Magazin - Spoof Commercial for "Glümp Ayrancola" Drink
- 2013: Tek Ümit - The Only Chance
- 2013: Knallerfrauen (Season 3 - Sketch "Yes I Know")
- 2014: Alarm für Cobra 11
- 2016: Volt
- 2016: Rabenmütter (Season 1 – Sketch „Pfefferspray“)
- 2017: Thirteen
- 2018: Jokers Comedy
- 2019: We Go High
- 2021: Annette

== Theater ==
- 2003: The Tempest (Shakespeare) [Supporting Role]

== Modelography ==
- 2010: Marktkarree Model Contest 2010 (2nd Place) [with Jana Ina Zarrella]
- 2011: Romeo&Julia Boutique Summer Fashion Show in Düsseldorf
- 2011: Romeo&Julia Boutique Winter Fashion Show at Castle Garath in Düsseldorf
- 2012: I Love Models Contest in Cologne (Finals) [with Irena Then (Playmate August 2011)]
- 2014: Marktkarree (5th Anniversary) Camp David, s.Oliver & Adidas Spring Collection
- 2016: Emilio Adani Winter Collection in Leverkusen

== Awards ==
- 2017: PLATINUM REMI AWARD 2017 ("for best Shortfilm in the Category Independent Shortfilm 311. Dramatic – Original") of the Independentfilmfestival WorldFest Houston in Houston (Texas) for THIRTEEN by Sasha Sibley
- 2019: CHARITY VIDEO AWARD 2019 (3rd) for the best Shortfilm in Düsseldorf (NRW) for WE GO HIGH by Denis Seyfert
- 2021: GOLDEN PALM 2021 (nominated) for best Film at Cannes Film Festival in Cannes (France) for ANNETTE by Leos Carax
