= Exotic Creatures of the Deep =

Studio album by Sparks
- Released: May 19, 2008
- Studio: Sparks Studios, Los Angeles, California
- Genre: Art pop; art rock; chamber pop
- Length: 49:58
- Label: Lil' Beethoven
- Producer: Ron Mael; Russell Mael

Sparks chronology
Hello Young Lovers (2006)	Exotic Creatures of the Deep (2008)	The Seduction of Ingmar Bergman (2009)

Singles from Exotic Creatures of the Deep
- 1. "Good Morning" Released: May 12, 2008; 2. "Lighten Up, Morrissey" b/w "Brenda Is Always in the Way" Released: March 2009

Alternative Cover
- Limited edition cover

Professional ratings
Review scores
Source	Rating
AllMusic	3.5/5 stars
BBC	(favourable)
ChartAttack	2/5 stars
MusicOMH	4/5 stars
NME	8/10 stars
The Onion	(B+)
Pitchfork Media	(4.4/10)
Spin	3.5/5 stars
Record Collector	4/5 stars

Exotic Creatures of the Deep is the 21st studio album by the American rock band Sparks.

== Release ==
Exotic Creatures of the Deep was as successful as their previous album, Hello Young Lovers, in the UK, where it bettered the chart position, reaching No. 54 on the UK Album Chart. A limited-edition version was released in a card sleeve in most territories and included a poster. Japanese editions included the bonus track "Brenda Is Always in the Way" as well as a DVD featuring five short films.

Two singles were released. The first, "Good Morning" on May 12, 2008, was on iTunes, a first for the group. The second, "Lighten Up, Morrissey" in March 2009, appeared on a 7", backed with "Brenda Is Always in the Way". Neither single charted in the UK.

Exotic Creatures of the Deep was also promoted in the UK by a number of live performances dubbed the "Sparks Spectacular": a record-setting twenty-date residency from May 16 through June 11, 2008 at London's Carling Islington Academy, where the group played each one of their previous twenty albums in its entirety in chronological order. The final appearance at London's Shepherd's Bush Empire on June 13 premiered Exotic Creatures of the Deep.

Appearing on an episode of music producer Nigel Godrich's From the Basement, Sparks performed a short set of material from Exotic Creatures, concluding with "Propaganda/At Work, at Home, at Play" from their 1974 album Propaganda. As was typical in the webseries which originally aired from 2006 to 2009, the performance is notable in that the show was in-studio and did not feature an audience.

== Re-release ==
In April 2022, as part of the "21st Century Sparks" collection on BMG, a series of reissues of Spark's studio albums from 2000's Balls to 2009's The Seduction of Ingmar Bergman, Exotic Creatures was remastered on LP, CD, and digital. The CD and digital releases have five bonus tracks, including "Brenda Is Always in the Way" and "Islington N1".

The album entered the UK Independent Albums Chart at no. 10 and the UK Vinyl Albums Chart at no. 37.

== Track listing ==
All tracks are written by Ron Mael and Russell Mael.

Exotic Creatures of the Deep standard track listing
No.	Title	Length
1.	"Intro"	1:02
2.	"Good Morning"	3:53
3.	"Strange Animal"	5:45
4.	"I Can't Believe That You Would Fall for All the Crap in This Song"	3:54
5.	"Let the Monkey Drive"	4:09
6.	"Intro Reprise"	0:24
7.	"I've Never Been High"	4:31
8.	"(She Got Me) Pregnant"	4:13
9.	"Lighten Up, Morrissey"	4:14
10.	"This Is the Renaissance"	3:45
11.	"The Director Never Yelled 'Cut'"	3:54
12.	"Photoshop"	4:01
13.	"Likeable"	6:13
Total length:		49:58

Japanese edition bonus track
No.	Title	Length
14.	"Brenda Is Always in the Way" (B-side of 7" single "Lighten Up, Morrissey")	4:03
Total length:		54:01

BMG reissue bonus tracks (2022)
No.	Title	Length
14.	"Brenda Is Always in the Way" (B-side of 7" single "Lighten Up, Morrissey")	4:03
15.	"Islington N1" (available only to "Golden Ticket" holders at the "Sparks Spectacular")	2:34
16.	"Mr. Hulot" (Unused theme song for "The Magnificent Tati")	1:37
17.	"I Am a Bookworm" (End theme for KCRW's "Bookworm")	1:32
18.	"Where Would We Be Without Books" (theme for KCRW's "Bookworm")	0:45
Total length:		60:29

Imperial Records (Japan) bonus DVD
No.	Title	Length
1.	"It's a Sparks Show"
2.	"Ron Tap Dancing"
3.	"Good Morning"
4.	"Strange Animals"
5.	"My Inspiration"

== Personnel ==
- Russell Mael – all vocals, engineering, mixing
- Ron Mael – keyboards, programming, orchestrations, mixing
- Tammy Glover – drums
- Dean Menta – guitars
- John Thomas – mixing, engineering

== Sparks Spectacular ==
For the 21-night "Sparks Spectacular" from May 16 through June 11, 2008 in London, Sparks played each of their albums in chronological order during the first twenty nights at the Carling Islington Academy, culminating in the première of their new album for the twenty-first concert on June 13, 2008 at Shepherd's Bush Empire. Each night they performed an album in its entirety with an encore of a rare track, many of which had never been performed live before. The band asked fans to visit their website and vote for the track that they'd most like to hear the band perform during the second half of the 21st concert following the première of Exotic Creatures of the Deep, though Russell Mael admitted that he and Ron would probably influence the poll a little.

Fans who bought a "Golden Ticket" for entry into all 21 gigs also received a poster signed by the band and a CD single entitled Islington N1, a reference to the postal address of the venue for the first 20 gigs.

Date	Album	Encore song
May 16	Sparks / Halfnelson (1971)	"England"
May 17	A Woofer in Tweeter's Clothing (1972)	"Arts & Crafts Spectacular"
May 18	Kimono My House (1974)	"Barbecutie"
May 20	Propaganda (1974)	"Lost and Found"
May 21	Indiscreet (1975)	"Gone with the Wind"
May 23	Big Beat (1976)	"Tearing the Place Apart"
May 24	Introducing Sparks (1977)	"Alabamy Right"
May 25	No. 1 In Heaven (1979)	"Dancing Is Dangerous"
May 27	Terminal Jive (1980)	"Singing in the Shower"
May 28	Whomp That Sucker (1981)	"Get Crazy"
May 30	Angst in My Pants (1982)	"Minnie Mouse"
May 31	In Outer Space (1983)	"Sports"
June 1	Pulling Rabbits Out of a Hat (1984)	"National Crime Awareness Week"
June 3	Music That You Can Dance To (1986)	"Change"
June 4	Interior Design (1988)	"Big Brass Ring", "It's Kinda Like the Movies"
June 6	Gratuitous Sax & Senseless Violins (1994)	"Marry Me"
June 7	Plagiarism (1997)	"Looks Aren't Everything"
June 8	Balls (2000)	"Katharine Hepburn"
June 10	Lil' Beethoven (2002)	"Wunderbar"
June 11	Hello Young Lovers (2006)	"Profile"
June 13	Exotic Creatures of the Deep (2008)	

Exotic Creatures of the Deep second set

1. "Moustache" (from Angst in My Pants)
2. "Looks Aren't Everything"
3. "Big Boy" (from Big Beat)
4. "Goofing Off" (from Introducing Sparks)
5. "Katharine Hepburn"
6. "Shopping Mall of Love" (from Music You Can Dance To)
7. "Those Mysteries" (from Introducing Sparks)
8. "Dick Around" (from Hello Young Lovers)
9. "Get in the Swing" (from Indiscreet)
10. "Looks, Looks, Looks" (from Indiscreet)
11. "Batteries Not Included" (from A Woofer in Tweeter's Clothing)
12. "Whippings and Apologies" (from A Woofer in Tweeter's Clothing)
13. "Change" (from Music That You Can Dance To)
14. "This Town Ain't Big Enough for Both of Us" (from Kimono My House)

== Charts ==
Chart performance for Exotic Creatures of the Deep
Chart (2022)	Peak position
Scottish Albums (OCC)	28
UK Independent Albums (OCC)	10
