= Hippopotamus (album) =

Studio album by Sparks
- Released: September 8, 2017
- Recorded: 2016
- Studio: Sparks Studio, Los Angeles
- Genre: Rock; art pop; chamber pop; baroque pop
- Length: 55:10
- Label: BMG; The End
- Producer: Ron Mael; Russell Mael

Sparks chronology
| FFS (2015) | Hippopotamus (2017) | A Steady Drip, Drip, Drip (2020) |

Singles from Hippopotamus
- 1. "Hippopotamus" Released: March 25, 2017; 2. "What the Hell Is It This Time?" Released: May 16, 2017; 3. "Edith Piaf (Said It Better Than Me)" Released: July 29, 2017; 4. "You've Earned the Right to Be a Dick" Released: April 21, 2018

Hippopotamus is the 23rd studio album by American rock and pop duo Sparks. It was released on September 8, 2017, through BMG Rights Management and The End Records, their first record issued on a major label for decades.

Following the 2009 radio musical The Seduction of Ingmar Bergman and Sparks' subsequent collaboration with Franz Ferdinand in FFS, the release of Hippopotamus marked a return to the traditional Sparks format of "short, literate, witty pop songs", mixing elements from the band's various stylistic periods.

Hippopotamus was met with critical acclaim, and entered the UK Albums Chart at no. 7, Sparks' first UK top-ten appearance in over 40 years.

== Background and recording ==
Having spent much of the past decade working on two musicals, radio production The Seduction of Ingmar Bergman and the movie musical Annette, a collaboration with French director Leos Carax, the Mael brothers set out to return to a more traditional song-oriented, rather than narrative, pop format for their next Sparks release, their interest in making such an album stoked by their recent collaboration with Franz Ferdinand. They worked on the album over a 10-month period, starting at the beginning of 2016 and ending in October, with most of the recording done in Russell Mael's home studio in Los Angeles.

== Style ==
Stylistically, Hippopotamus was classified as baroque pop by journalist Claire Biddles, and simply rock by reviewer Sandy Lewis.

== Music videos ==
The video by Joseph Wallace for the single "Edith Piaf (Said It Better Than Me)" featured stop-motion puppets modelled on the Mael brothers going on a surreal adventure in 1930s' Paris. It was well received by critics and fans as well as Sparks themselves, who have talked about plans to work with Wallace and puppet animation in future projects.

== Release ==
The album was published via BMG rather than the Maels' own Lil' Beethoven label. BMG had just taken on the publishing rights for Sparks' back catalogue, which had come up for renewal. "Once we did a publishing deal with them," Russell Mael told PopMatters, "the record label side of BMG really was interested in listening to the new album. So they flew out from London and we played them the album and they just kind of flipped out and said, 'This is amazing, we need to do the record deal now as well.'" BMG signed the album worldwide. Sparks toured Europe and the United States in support of the album.

== Critical reception ==
Professional ratings
Aggregate scores
| Source | Rating |
|---|---|
| Metacritic | 81/100 |
Review scores
| Source | Rating |
| AllMusic | 3.5/5 stars |
| Exclaim! | 8/10 |
| The Guardian | 4/5 stars |
| The Independent | 5/5 stars |
| The Irish Times | 4/5 stars |
| Mojo | 4/5 stars |
| Pitchfork | 7.1/10 |
| Q | 3/5 stars |
| Record Collector | 5/5 stars |
| The Times | 5/5 stars |

Hippopotamus has a score of 81 out of 100 on the review aggregator website Metacritic, based on 18 reviews, indicating "universal acclaim". The album entered the UK charts at no. 7, Sparks' first top-ten appearance in the UK Albums Chart since Propaganda in 1974.

In a five-star review for The Independent, Andy Gill described Hippopotamus as a "glorious and inventive return from the Mael brothers ... smarter and more satisfying than ever." Leigh Sanders, writing for the Express & Star, described the album as "magnificent", while Dave Simpson in The Guardian called it the group's "best album in decades", with songs that had "a new emotional heft" to them. Daryl Easlea's review in Record Collector noted that "Ron's lyrics, as always, locate the heart of the matter, finding the chink in the armour, the dust on the lens" and described the album as "exactly what you'd expect and more besides." Q characterized it as a "straight-up Sparks LP". Reviewer Andrew Perry said that it is "laced with all the latterday narrative leanings, Broadway arrangement and pastiches" while adding, "as ever, there's much fun to be had". Mojo concluded that "beautifully offset by Ron's offbeat pop-classical arrangements [...] Hippopotamus is never anything less than wildly entertaining". In a review rated 8.9 out of 10, Paste praised "its multifaceted compositional creativity, coupled with its consistently fetching melodies and words". In a review rated 8 out of 10, Clash noted that Hippopotamus was "wryly humorous" and "Pure vaudeville, pure theatre – and pure Sparks". The Times, in another five-star review, declared: "Russell's fraught falsetto may suggest high emotion, the melodies may be affecting, but Ron's lyrics never assume that the listener is interested in the brothers' life". For reviewer Will Hodgkinson, "this is bright, witty music that lives on the margins". Uncut rated it 8 out of 10. Reviewer Jason Anderson said that it "is wide and rich enough to provide no end of delights", whether it's an ode to Swedish aesthetics, "a celebration of Gallic cool or marvels too many to count". Critic John McFerrin noted that several of the lyrics on Hippopotamus seemed preoccupied with mortality and ageing, suggesting that "their career as musical Peter Pans eventually has to run into difficulties they hadn't considered previously, and this ends up providing a tangible measure of genuine emotional heft to the album that wasn't typical for the band to this point".

Commenting on the album's musical style, Randy Lewis, writing for the Los Angeles Times, said, "Hippopotamus brings the Mael brothers back more into the realm of rock music with the inclusion of electric guitars, bass and drums largely absent from their more orchestral-driven outings of the past decade-plus", concluding the album was "simply put, genius". Rob Mesure of musicOMH judged the album "a varied and immensely satisfying set, picking elements from their different eras – from oddball, articulate rock, through synthpop, to opera – and tossing them nonchalantly together – adding a smattering of drum'n'bass (Giddy, Giddy) and cool, flatpacked Europop (Scandinavian Design) – like the assortment of objects floating in the pool of the title track ... a big, joyous beast of an album."

=== Accolades ===
| Publication | Accolade | Year | Rank | Ref. |
|---|---|---|---|---|
| MOJO | Top 50 Albums of 2017 | 2017 | 15 | |
| Glide | 20 Best Albums of 2017 | 2017 | N/A | |
| Q Magazine | 50 Best Albums of 2017 | 2017 | 26 | |
| Classic Rock Magazine | 50 Albums of the Year | 2017 | 29 | |
| Uncut | 75 Best Albums of 2017 | 2017 | 69 | |
| Fopp | Best Albums of 2017 | 2017 | 82 | |

== Track listing ==
All tracks are written by Ron and Russell Mael.

| No. | Title | Length |
|---|---|---|
| 1. | "Probably Nothing" | 1:21 |
| 2. | "Missionary Position" | 4:18 |
| 3. | "Edith Piaf (Said It Better Than Me)" | 4:32 |
| 4. | "Scandinavian Design" | 4:10 |
| 5. | "Giddy Giddy" | 3:10 |
| 6. | "What the Hell Is It This Time?" | 4:03 |
| 7. | "Unaware" | 3:54 |
| 8. | "Hippopotamus" | 3:47 |
| 9. | "Bummer" | 3:58 |
| 10. | "I Wish You Were Fun" | 4:04 |
| 11. | "So Tell Me Mrs. Lincoln Aside from That How Was the Play?" | 4:00 |
| 12. | "When You're a French Director" (featuring Leos Carax) | 2:45 |
| 13. | "The Amazing Mr. Repeat" | 2:59 |
| 14. | "A Little Bit Like Fun" | 3:57 |
| 15. | "Life with the Macbeths" (featuring Rebecca Sjöwall) | 4:12 |

Hippopotamus – Japanese CD edition bonus track
| No. | Title | Length |
|---|---|---|
| 16. | "You've Earned the Right to Be a Dick" | 3:10 |

== Personnel ==
Credits are adapted from the CD liner notes.

=== Sparks ===
- Ron Mael – keyboards, arrangements, production
- Russell Mael – vocals, arrangements, production

=== Additional contributors ===
- Dean Menta – guitars, bass; drums ("Bummer")
- Steve Nistor – drums (except "Bummer")
- Leos Carax – vocals and accordion ("When You're a French Director")
- Rebecca Sjöwall – vocals ("Life with the Macbeths")
- Bill Inglot – mastering at d2 Mastering
- Dave Schultz – mastering at d2 Mastering
- Galen Johnson – design
- Elaine Stocki – photography

== Charts ==
=== Album ===
| Chart (2017) | Peak position |
|---|---|
| Belgian Albums (Ultratop Flanders) | 104 |
| Belgian Albums (Ultratop Wallonia) | 32 |
| French Albums (SNEP) | 108 |
| German Albums (Offizielle Top 100) | 88 |
| Dutch Albums (Album Top 100) | 38 |
| Scottish Albums (OCC) | 7 |
| Swedish Albums (Sverigetopplistan) | 45 |
| UK Albums (OCC) | 7 |
| US Independent Albums (Billboard) | 48 |

=== Singles ===
"You've Earned the Right to Be a Dick"
| Chart (2018) | Peak position |
|---|---|
| UK Physical Singles (OCC) | 5 |
