= Hello Young Lovers (Sparks album) =

Studio album by Sparks
- Released: February 6, 2006
- Studio: Sparks Studios, Los Angeles, California
- Genre: Art pop; art rock; chamber pop
- Length: 50:39
- Label: In the Red (US), Gut (UK)
- Producer: Ron Mael, Russell Mael

Sparks chronology
Lil' Beethoven (2002)	Hello Young Lovers (2006)	Exotic Creatures of the Deep (2008)

Singles from Hello Young Lovers
- 1. "Perfume" b/w "(Baby, Baby) Can I Invade Your Country (Alternative Verse)" Released: February 13, 2006; 2. "Dick Around" / "Waterproof" Released: September 18, 2006

Professional ratings
Review scores
Source	Rating
AllMusic	4/5 stars
BBC	(positive)
Dusted Reviews	(negative)
Pitchfork Media	6.9/10
Play Louder	4.5/5 stars
Slant Magazine	3.5/5 stars
Stylus Magazine	B+

Hello Young Lovers is the 20th studio album by American pop and rock duo Sparks, released in 2006. It is a continuation of the repetitious, orchestral sound of their previous album Lil' Beethoven, but with a greater emphasis on guitar and drums. The album, which addresses various aspects of modern love, is a concept album.

== Release ==
Hello Young Lovers was commercially more popular than any Sparks album since the 1970s, and it reached No. 66 on the UK Albums Chart. It did not chart in the US. The album was released on CD and both white and pink vinyl. The CD was initially released on Gut Records, and then later released on In the Red Records.

Two singles and an EP were released to promote the album. The first, "Perfume", was backed with an alternative version of "(Baby, Baby) Can I Invade Your Country" and a remix by Clor. It peaked at No. 80 on the UK Singles Chart and No. 10 on the UK Independent Singles Chart.

"Dick Around" was released as an EP in the US and as a double A-side single with "Waterproof" in the UK. Both versions featured an edited version of "Dick Around" and the US version included live tracks recorded earlier that year in Los Angeles. The UK release of the song fell foul of a ban by the BBC, who took issue with the title citing it as obscene. Sparks issued a statement: "The BBC has officially killed off our new single Dick Around, ostensibly through rather childish objections to the title, an innocent reference to the idle life. That a piece of music can be condemned purely by its title without the 'decision makers' even having the decency to open the CD case is a travesty and an insult to both us as the creators of the music and to the listeners of the BBC." Eventually, in a statement BBC London said that the track is back in rotation. The single charted at No. 139 in the UK.

== Re-release ==
In April 2022, a remastered Hello Young Lovers was issued on LP, CD and digital as part of the five album "21st Century Sparks" collection. The CD and digital releases contain two bonus tracks: An alternative version of "(Baby, Baby) Can I Invade Your Country" previously released as a B-side, and a cover of "We Are the Clash" recorded for an Uncut magazine tribute to The Clash in 2003.

It entered the UK Independent Albums Chart at No. 14.

== Track listing ==
All tracks are written by Ron and Russell Mael, except where indicated.

No.	Title	Writer(s)	Length
1.	"Dick Around"		6:35
2.	"Perfume"		4:59
3.	"The Very Next Fight"		5:18
4.	"(Baby, Baby) Can I Invade Your Country"	Ron and Russell Mael, Francis Scott Key (Additional lyrics)	5:56
5.	"Rock, Rock, Rock"		5:10
6.	"Metaphor"		4:03
7.	"Waterproof"		4:17
8.	"Here Kitty"		4:26
9.	"There's No Such Thing as Aliens"		2:53
10.	"As I Sit Down to Play the Organ at the Notre Dame Cathedral"		7:02
Total length:			50:39

BMG reissue bonus tracks (2022)
No.	Title	Writer(s)	Length
11.	"We Are the Clash"	Joe Strummer; Bernie Rhodes	3:26
12.	"(Baby, Baby) Can I Invade Your Country" (Alternative Lyric)		6:34
Total length:			60:39

== Personnel ==
- Ron Mael – keyboards, orchestrations, and production
- Russell Mael – vocals, engineering, and production
- John Thomas – mixing and additional engineering
- Tammy Glover – drums
- Dean Menta – guitars
- Jim Wilson – additional guitar
- Steven Shane McDonald – additional bass

== Charts ==
=== Album ===
Original release
Chart (2006)	Peak position
Scottish Albums (OCC)	49
Swedish Albums (Sverigetopplistan)	48
UK Albums (OCC)	66
UK Independent Albums (OCC)	9

21st Century edition
Chart (2022)	Peak position
Scottish Albums (OCC)	28
UK Independent Albums (OCC)	14
UK Physical Albums (OCC)	24

=== Singles ===
"Perfume"
Chart (2006)	Peak Position
Scotland Singles (OCC)	46
UK Singles (OCC)	80
UK Indie (OCC)	10
UK Physical Singles (OCC)	56

"Dick Around" / "Waterproof"
Chart (2006)	Peak Position
Scotland Singles (OCC)	67
UK Singles (OCC)	139
UK Indie (OCC)	11
UK Physical Singles (OCC)	68
