= Dick Around =

Single by Sparks

from the album Hello Young Lovers
- Released: February 2006 (single); September 25, 2006 (EP)
- Recorded: 2005
- Genre: Art pop; heavy metal
- Length: 6:35
- Label: Gut
- Songwriters: Ron Mael; Russell Mael
- Producers: Ron Mael; Russell Mael

Sparks singles chronology
"Suburban Homeboy" (2003)	"Dick Around" (2006)	"Perfume" (2006)

Music video
- "Dick Around" on YouTube

"Dick Around" is a song by the American rock band Sparks. It was the second single from Hello Young Lovers, the twentieth album by the group. The song was edited from 6 minutes and 35 seconds to 3 minutes 51 seconds for the single and video. It is the opening track on the album Hello Young Lovers. An EP was also released in the US and was also widely available in the UK. The UK single version was released as a double A-side with "Waterproof".

== Track listings ==
7"

1. "Dick Around"
2. "Hospitality on Parade" (live)

UK single

1. "Dick Around"
2. "Waterproof"
3. "Change" (live)
4. "Interview"
5. "Dick Around" (CD-ROM track)

EP

1. "Dick Around"
2. "(Baby Baby) Can I Invade Your Country" (alternate lyrics)
3. "Happy Hunting Ground" (live, The Avalon, Hollywood, CA, May 20 2006)
4. "Bon Voyage" (live, The Avalon, Hollywood, CA, May 20 2006)
5. "In the Future" (live, The Avalon, Hollywood, CA, May 20 2006)
6. "Interview of Sparks by Steve Jones of Jonesey's Jukebox"
7. "Dick Around" (CD-ROM track)
8. "Perfume" (CD-ROM track)

== Personnel ==
- Ron Mael – keyboards, orchestrations and production
- Russell Mael – vocals, engineering and production
- John Thomas – mixing and additional engineering
- Tammy Glover – drums
- Dean Menta – guitars

== Chart positions ==
Chart (2006)	Peak position
Scotland (OCC)	67
UK (OCC)	139
