= We'll Never Have Paris =

- Film poster
- Directed by: Simon Helberg; Jocelyn Towne
- Written by: Simon Helberg
- Produced by: Robert Ogden Barnum; Simon Helberg; Jocelyn Towne
- Starring: Simon Helberg; Melanie Lynskey; Maggie Grace; Zachary Quinto; Jason Ritter; Alfred Molina; Judith Light
- Cinematography: Polly Morgan
- Edited by: Mollie Goldstein
- Music by: Samuel Jones; Alexis Marsh
- Production companies: Bifrost Pictures; The Bridge Finance Company; E2B Capital; H3 Films; Marc Platt Productions; PalmStar Entertainment; K5 International; Dog Eared Pictures
- Distributed by: Orion Pictures
- Release dates: March 10, 2014 (SXSW); January 22, 2015 (United States)
- Running time: 89 minutes
- Country: United States
- Language: English

Melanie Lynskey discussing We'll Never Have Paris in 2014

We'll Never Have Paris is a 2014 American romantic comedy film directed by Simon Helberg (in his directorial debut) and Jocelyn Towne. It stars Helberg, Melanie Lynskey, Zachary Quinto, Maggie Grace, Jason Ritter, and Alfred Molina. It is based on the real-life engagement of Helberg to his wife, Towne.

The film had its world premiere at SXSW on March 10, 2014, and was released in a limited release and through video on demand on January 23, 2015, by Orion Pictures.

The title is a reference to the famous line "We'll Always Have Paris" from the film Casablanca (1942).

== Plot ==
Quinn (Simon Helberg) and Devon (Melanie Lynskey) have been a couple since high school. Quinn works at a flower shop, and Devon teaches at the local university. Kelsey (Maggie Grace), Quinn's coworker, tells Quinn she's in love with him. Quinn tells Devon he wants to take a step back in the relationship. Knowing it's about Kelsey, Devon storms out and goes to her parents' place.

Quinn goes to Kelsey's. They kiss, and she gives him a handjob. In the morning, an ashamed Quinn visits Devon at her parents and proposes. He ends up confessing what happened with Kelsey. Angered, Devon says they need time apart to figure things out. She suggests he should be with other women so it wouldn't bother him that he has only slept with her.

Quinn finds a former schoolmate on Facebook and sleeps with her. He realises he wants to be with Devon and quits his job. At Devon's parents' place, he finds out she has left for Paris. He sends her flowers and shows up at the door.

In Paris, Devon tells Quinn she is dating Guillaume (Ebon Moss-Bachrach) and doesn't want to be with Quinn anymore. Quinn surprises her at her grandparents, but Guillaume is also there. After the meal, both Guillaume and Quinn give short recitals. In spite of his pingueculitis, Quinn takes out a ring and prepares to propose after his performance. Devon enters with Kelsey, who has come to win Quinn back. Quinn accidentally steps on Guillaume's heirloom violin, crushing it. The two have a slap fight. Ashamed, Quinn returns home.

Devon surprises Quinn at his new workplace. He proposes to her in his car. After she accepts, he tells her about his one-night stand. After a tense talk, and groveling on Quinn's part, Devon takes off the ring and asks Quinn to propose again.

== Cast ==
- Simon Helberg as Quinn Berman
- Melanie Lynskey as Devon
- Maggie Grace as Kelsey
- Zachary Quinto as Jameson
- Ebon Moss-Bachrach as Guillaume
- Jason Ritter as Kurt
- Alfred Molina as Terry Berman, Quinn's father
- Judith Light as Jean, Devon's mother
- Meredith Hagner as Leah

== Production ==
The film marks Simon Helberg's directorial debut and is his wife Jocelyn Towne's second directorial feature. Filming began in July 2013 in New York City and Paris.

== Release ==
The film had its world premiere at SXSW on March 10, 2014, and was the closing feature at the Edinburgh International Film Festival on June 29, 2014. The film was acquired by Orion Pictures, and was released in a limited release, and through video on demand on January 22, 2015.

== Reception ==
On Rotten Tomatoes, the film has an approval rating of 33%, based on 24 reviews, with an average rating of 4.6/10. The Hollywood Reporter gave the film a mixed review, citing it as "genial but not wholly persuasive". Variety deemed it "sporadically amusing, but more often grating". The Los Angeles Times gave a more positive review, calling it "a fun, quirky romantic comedy".

== Awards and nominations ==
Year	Festival	Category	Nominee(s)	Result
2014	SXSW Film Festival	Audience Award – Narrative Spotlight	Simon Helberg & Jocelyn Towne	Nominated
2014	Newport Beach Film Festival	Audience Award – Best Comedy Feature	Simon Helberg & Jocelyn Towne	Won
