= Jocelyn Towne =

American actress

- Born: United States
- Citizenship: United States; France
- Occupations: Actor; producer; director
- Years active: 2000–present
- Spouse: Simon Helberg (m. 2007)
- Children: 2
- Relatives: Robert Towne (uncle)

Jocelyn Towne is an American actress, producer and director.

== Early life ==
Towne was born in the United States to an American father and French mother.

== Career ==
Towne has appeared in a number of minor roles in film and television, including Havoc in 2005, Gilmore Girls in 2007 and The Selling in 2011.

Towne made her directorial debut in 2013 with I Am I, followed in 2014 by We'll Never Have Paris, co-directed with Simon Helberg.

== Personal life ==
Towne's uncle was screenwriter Robert Towne. Towne married actor Simon Helberg on July 7, 2007. They have a daughter Adeline, and a son, Wilder Towne Helberg.

== Filmography ==
=== Filmography ===
| Year | Title | Role | Note |
|---|---|---|---|
| 2000 | Burning Heart | Blue Lady | |
| 2004 | Elvis Has Left The Building | Harmony's Secretary | |
| 2005 | Havoc | Female Cop #1 | |
| 2006 | The Pity Card | Madeleine the Waitress | |
| 2007 | Gilmore Girls | Aurora | Episode: "I Am A Kayak, Hear Me Roar" |
| 2007 | Derek and Simon: The Show | Claire | Episode: "Peanuts!" |
| 2011 | The Selling | Dead Girl | |
| 2011 | A Bird of the Air | Susie | |
| 2013 | I Am I | Rachel | Also writer and director |
| 2014 | We'll Never Have Paris | | Director |
| 2016 | Diani & Devine Meet the Apocalypse | Kathi | |
| 2018 | Lodge 49 | Gloria Keller | 3 episodes |
| 2021 | The Kominsky Method | Jeanine | 2 episodes |
