= Tammy Glover =

American drummer

Tammy Glover is an American television producer, film producer, and musician. She served as the VP of Production for Comedy Central from 2007 to 2011, Senior Vice President of Production for FremantleMedia and is currently the Head of Physical Production for TNT, TBS, and TruTV, part of Warner Bros Discovery. Glover was on the Board of Governors for the Academy of Television Arts & Sciences, representing production executives. She played drums for Sparks from 1997 to 2011 and contributed to BBC Radio 6 Music's This Town Ain't Big Enough For Both Of Us: The Story Of Sparks, presented by Mark Radcliffe. She also performs with guitarist Billy Zimmer in the duo Thorcraft Cobra. Modern Drummer has done a number of features on Glover. and she has contributed session work for many projects, including solo work for David Dattner, and playing live drums for the Peter G Adams soundtrack of CodeGirl.

== Music career ==
Glover is a musician who started her professional career in a house band at MTV. She has toured the world as the drummer for Sparks and appears in Edgar Wright's celebrated documentary about the band, The Sparks Brothers.

While touring with Sparks, Glover rang in the Millennium at the Brandenburg Gate in a performance for over a million people during their hit single in Germany. Glover began recording with Sparks in 1997 and played on their albums Balls, Lil' Beethoven, Hello Young Lovers, Exotic Creatures of the Deep, and The Seduction of Ingmar Bergman. They have sold out Royal Festival Hall in London for Morrissey's Meltdown, mounted a stage production of The Seduction of Ingmar Bergman at the Fonda Theater for the LA Film Festival, and premiered in Stockholm, Sweden.

Glover is also one-half of the indie rock band Thorcraft Cobra with Billy Zimmer and released an acclaimed self-titled EP, the debut album Count it In and their second album and vinyl release The Distance. Thorcraft Cobra has also toured across the US and Canada, and have performed at various festivals throughout America, Europe, and Canada, including SXSW in Austin. "Uncoupling", their first single from their most recent album, reached #7 in America in the Alternative Specialty format. The song became a hit in Canada, spending five months on CBC Radio 3. The record was produced by Rob Schnapf (Beck, Elliott Smith, Foo Fighters, Kurt Vile) and features musical contributions from Brett Farkas (Lord Huron) and the Juno Award-winning artist Russell Broom.

Glover also plays bass for Lisa Paschall in a project called Paschall Park.

She wrote and produced a musical called Wendy, My Darling, as well as playing drums, bass, synths, and guitars and singing the vocals on the score.

In 2023, Wendy, My Darling was performed live at multiple festivals, including the Edinburgh Festival Fringe. The musical was directed by three-time Emmy winner Krysia Plonka as a one-person play starring April Wish. The visual art and videos in Glover's musical were created by multimedia artist Mahsa Zargaran. Busy Philips and John Cryer made video appearances in the live performance of the musical.

== Production career ==
As of 2022, Glover was Head of Production for TNT, TBS, and TruTV, which is part of Warner Bros Discovery, where her slate includes Emmy nominated Snowpiercer with Jennifer Connelly and Daveed Diggs, Miracle Workers with Daniel Radcliffe and Steve Buscemi, and Chad with Nasim Pedrad.

Prior to that, Glover served as VP of Production at Comedy Central where she guided hits like Workaholics, Inside Amy Schumer, Key & Peele, and Tosh.0 from development through their first cycles on the network and supervised everything from sketch comedy to game shows, animation and long-form scripted shows, including The Daily Show, and South Park. Tammy is a leader in organizations as varied as The Television Academy, where she served as a Governor for Production Executives, WICT (Women in Cable Television), The Recording Academy, and UCLA's Parent Council.

== Selected discography ==
| Year | Artist / Album | Label | Credit |
|---|---|---|---|
| 2000 | Sparks / Balls | Strange Ways | Drums |
| 2002 | Sparks / Lil' Beethoven | Lil' Beethoven Records / Palm Pictures | Drums, Timpani, Percussion and Backing Vocals |
| 2006 | Sparks / Hello Young Lovers | Gut Records | Drums and Backing Vocals |
| 2008 | Sparks / Exotic Creatures of the Deep | Lil' Beethoven Records | Drums and Backing Vocals |
| 2009 | Sparks / The Seduction of Ingmar Bergman | SR Records / Lil'Beethoven Records | Drums and Cast Member |
| 2010 | Thorcraft Cobra / EP | Plaza Bowl | Drums and Vocals |
| 2013 | Thorcraft Cobra / Count It In | Plaza Bowl | Drums and Vocals |
| 2017 | Thorcraft Cobra / The Distance | Plaza Bowl | Drums and Vocals |
