= Simon Helberg =

American actor and comedian (born 1980)

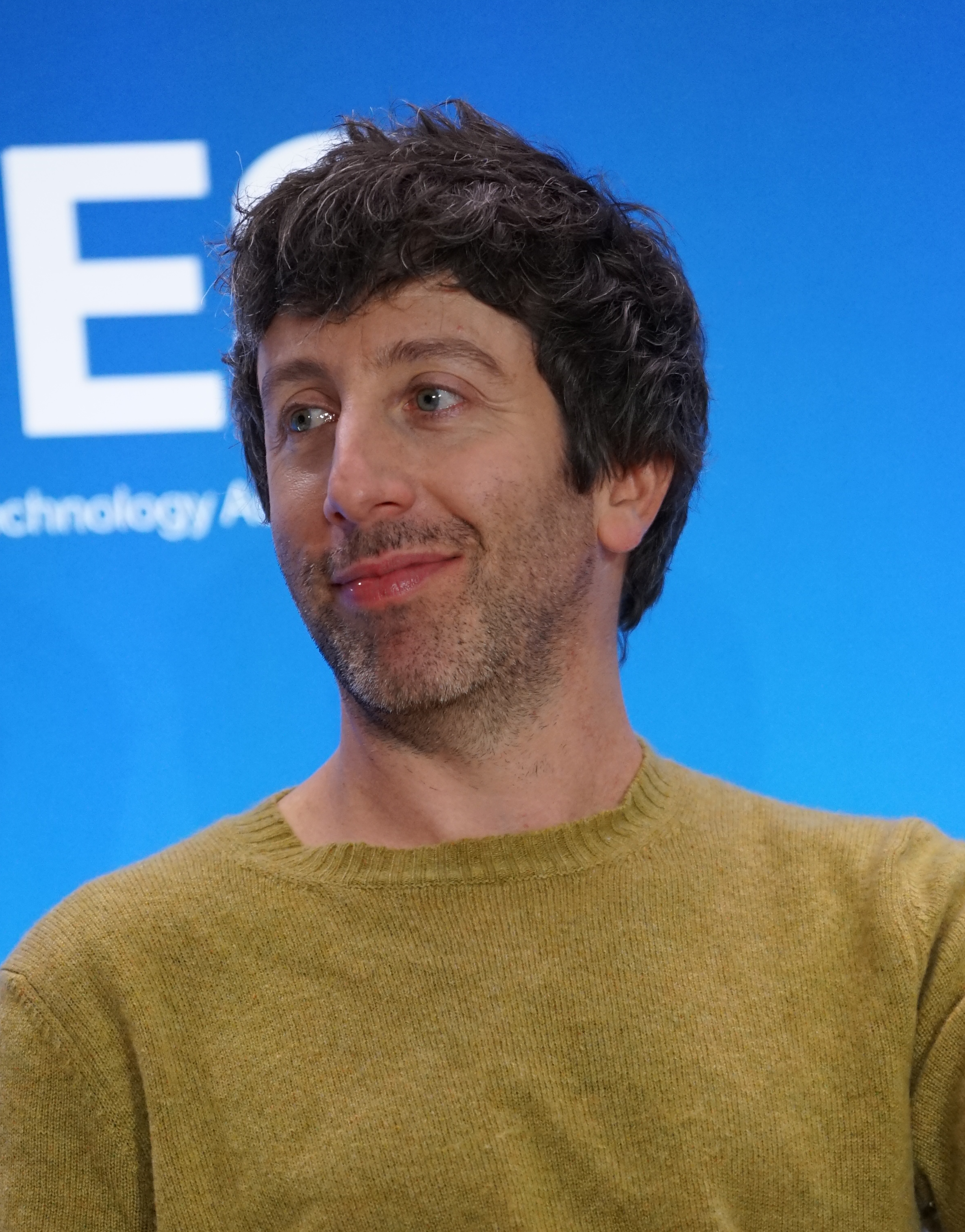
- Helberg at CES 2026
- Born: Simon Maxwell Helberg; December 9, 1980 (age 45); Los Angeles, California, U.S.
- Citizenship: United States; France
- Education: New York University (BFA)
- Occupations: Actor; comedian; musician
- Years active: 1999–present
- Spouse: Jocelyn Towne (m. 2007)
- Children: 2
- Father: Sandy Helberg

Simon Maxwell Helberg (born December 9, 1980) is an American actor, comedian and musician. He is widely known for playing Howard Wolowitz on the CBS sitcom The Big Bang Theory (2007–2019) and won the Critics' Choice Television Award for Best Supporting Actor in a Comedy Series for the role. His performance as Cosmé McMoon in the film Florence Foster Jenkins (2016) received a nomination for the Golden Globe Award for Best Supporting Actor – Motion Picture. Helberg has also appeared on the sketch comedy series MADtv as a cast member in season 8 (2002–2003), and his other film roles including Old School (2003), Good Night, and Good Luck (2005), Walk Hard: The Dewey Cox Story (2007), A Serious Man (2009), and Annette (2021).

== Early life ==
Simon Maxwell Helberg was born on December 9, 1980, in Los Angeles. His parents are actor Sandy Helberg and casting director Harriet Helberg (née Birnbaum). He was raised Jewish, "Conservative to Reform but more Reform as time went on."

Helberg attended middle and high school at the Crossroads School in Santa Monica, California, with Jason Ritter, who later became his roommate at New York University. He attended New York University's Tisch School of the Arts, where he trained at the Atlantic Theater Company.

== Career ==
Since the early 2000s, Helberg performed with comedian Derek Waters as the sketch comedy duo Derek & Simon. In 2007, the two starred together in Derek and Simon: The Show, a web series they created with comedian Bob Odenkirk for the comedy website Super Deluxe. They previously made two short films "Derek & Simon: The Pity Card" (co-starring Zach Galifianakis and Bill Hader) and "Derek & Simon: A Bee and a Cigarette" (co-starring Casey Wilson and Emily Rutherfurd) and had a pilot deal with HBO in 2005. One of Helberg's earliest jobs in television was briefly joining the cast of MADtv for one season in 2002.

Helberg appeared in the 2002 feature film Van Wilder as one of the geeky students for whom Van Wilder was throwing a party. He had a minor role in the 2003 movie Old School. In 2004, he was in two episodes of Reno 911!: Student Driver in "Raineesha X" and Hooker Buying Son in "Not Without My Mustache". He had a small role in the sixth episode of Quintuplets, "Get a Job", as a man called Neil working behind the counter at a shoe shop where Paige and Patton were working.

In 2004, he appeared in the film A Cinderella Story, starring Hilary Duff and Chad Michael Murray. Helberg played the minor role of Simon in George Clooney's 2005 film Good Night, and Good Luck, where he had one line. In 2005, he had a bit part on Arrested Development as Jeff, an employee of the film studio where Maeby worked. From 2006 to 2007, he had a minor supporting role as Alex Dwyer in the drama Studio 60 on the Sunset Strip. In 2006, he appeared in a series of comical TV commercials for Richard Branson's UK financial services company Virgin Money. He played a small role in the 2007 film Walk Hard: The Dewey Cox Story as a Jewish record producer.

In 2007, Helberg was cast as Howard Wolowitz, in the CBS comedy series The Big Bang Theory. Forbes placed him third in its world's highest-paid TV actors list in 2018 with his revenues rising to $23.5 million in that year.

He appeared as the character Moist in Dr. Horrible's Sing-Along Blog, and had a small role in the pilot episode of the Judd Apatow-produced sitcom Undeclared. In the 2009 Coen brothers film A Serious Man, he played junior Rabbi Scott Ginsler. He had a minor role in the season 4 finale of The Guild as one of the Game Masters.

In 2016, Helberg starred alongside Meryl Streep and Hugh Grant in Florence Foster Jenkins, directed by Stephen Frears; he played pianist Cosmé McMoon and his performance was nominated for the Golden Globe Award for Best Supporting Actor – Motion Picture. Not only did Helberg act in the film, he also played the piano. Helberg next starred in Annette opposite Adam Driver.

== Personal life ==
Helberg married actress Jocelyn Towne, the niece of screenwriter Robert Towne, on July 7, 2007. They have a daughter and a son.

Helberg has been friends with Nathan Hamill, son of actor Mark Hamill, since he was 9 years old. Helberg has been friends with actor Jason Ritter since he was 12 years old. They went to college together and continue to work together when given the opportunity.

Through his wife Jocelyn, who is a French citizen through her French mother, Helberg himself became a French citizen to obtain the role of the Conductor in French director Leos Carax's English-language debut Annette, which opened the 2021 Cannes Film Festival.

== Filmography ==
=== Film ===
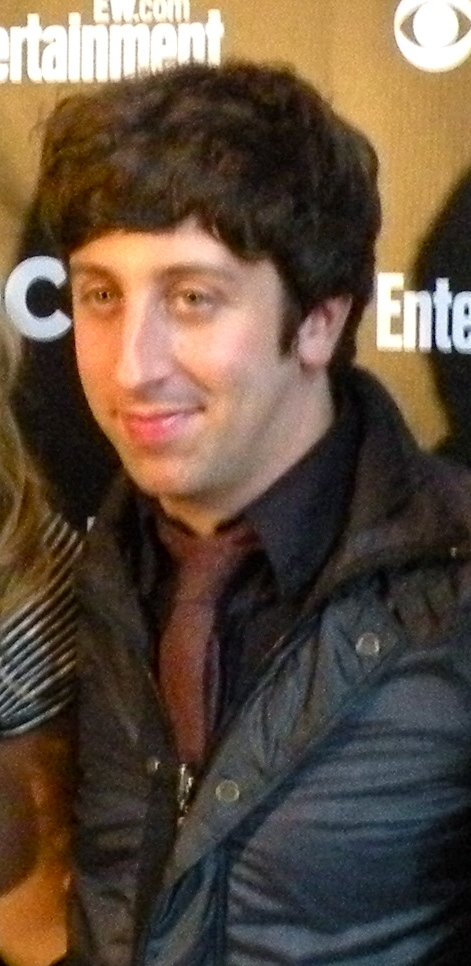
Simon Helberg in 2010

Year	Title	Role	Note
1999	Mumford	College Roommate	
2002	Van Wilder	Vernon	
2003	Old School	Jerry	
2004	A Cinderella Story	Terry	
2005	Good Night, and Good Luck	CBS Page	
2006	Derek & Simon: A Bee and a Cigarette	Simon	Short film, also writer and producer
2006	The Pity Card	Simon	Short film, also writer and producer
2006	Bickford Shmeckler's Cool Ideas	Al	
2006	The TV Set	TJ Goldman	
2006	For Your Consideration	Junior Agent	
2007	Careless	Stewart	
2007	Evan Almighty	Staffer	
2007	Mama's Boy	Rathkon	
2007	Walk Hard: The Dewey Cox Story	Dreidel L'Chaim	
2009	A Serious Man	Rabbi Scott Ginsler	
2011	The Selling	Young Husband	
2011	Let Go	Frank	
2013	I Am I	Seth	Also executive producer
2014	We'll Never Have Paris	Quinn Berman	Also director, writer and producer
2015	Hollywood Adventures	Translator	
2016	Florence Foster Jenkins	Cosmé McMoon	
2021	Annette	The Accompanist	
2022	As They Made Us	Nathan	
2022	Space Oddity	Dmitri	
2025	For Worse	Mediator	
TBA	Triumph of the Will	TBA	Post-production

=== Television ===
Year	Title	Role	Note
2001	Popular	Gus Latrine	Episode: "Coup"
2001	Cursed	Andy Tinker	Episode: "And then Jack Became the Voice of Cougars"
2001	Ruling Class	Fred Foster	Episode: "Pilot"
2001	Son of the Beach	Billy	Episode: "It's Showtime at the Apollo 13!"
2001	Undeclared	Jack	Episode: "Prototype"
2002	Sabrina, the Teenage Witch	The Spokesman	Episode: "Time After Time"
2002	The Funkhousers	Donnie Funkhouser	Episode: "Pilot"
2002–2003	MADtv	Various	5 episodes
2003	Less than Perfect	Arthur	Episode: "It Takes a Pillage"
2003	Tracey Ullman in the Trailer Tales	Adam	Television special
2004	Quintuplets	Neil	Episode: "Get a Job"
2004	Reno 911!	Hooker Buying Son / Student Driver	2 episodes
2004–2006	Joey	Seth Tobin	4 episodes
2005	Unscripted	Simon / Casting Assistant	2 episodes
2005	Life on a Stick	Vinnie	Episode: "Liking Things the Way They Aren't"
2005	Arrested Development	Jeff	Episode: "Meat the Veals"
2006	The Jake Effect	Bill Skidelsky	Episode: "Flight School"
2006–2007	Studio 60 on the Sunset Strip	Alex Dwyer	14 episodes
2007	Derek and Simon: The Show	Simon	Main role, 13 episodes, also co-creator, writer and producer
2007	The Minor Accomplishments of Jackie Woodman	Matt Menard	Episode: "Bad Luck Brad"
2007–2019	The Big Bang Theory	Howard Wolowitz	Main role, 279 episodes
2008	Dr. Horrible's Sing-Along Blog	Moist	3 episodes
2010	The Guild	Kevinator	Episode: "Guild Hall"
2010–2011	Kick Buttowski: Suburban Daredevil	Ronaldo (voice)	3 episodes
2011–2016	Kung Fu Panda: Legends of Awesomeness	Bian Zao (voice)	8 episodes
2013	Drunk History	Frank Mason Robinson	Episode: "Atlanta"
2014	The Tom and Jerry Show	Napoleon (voice)	9 episodes
2015	Comedy Bang! Bang!	Himself	Episode: "Simon Helberg Wears a Sky Blue Button Down and Jeans"
2021	Dug Days	Squirrel (voice)	Episode: "Science"
2021	Young Sheldon	Howard Wolowitz (voice)	Episode: "An Introduction to Engineering and a Glob of Hair Gel"
2023	American Dad!	Dr. Revanche / Creep (voice)	3 episodes
2023–2025	Poker Face	FBI Agent Luca Clark	5 episodes
2025	Night Court	Spencer	Episode: "A Decent Proposal"
2026	The Audacity	Martin Phister	

=== Theatre ===
Year	Title	Role	Notes
2010	Doctor Cerberus	Franklin Robertson	L.A. Theatre Works, Los Angeles, United States
2010	How to Succeed in Business Without Really Trying	Bud Frump	Reprise Theatre Company, Los Angeles, United States
2013	A Midsummer Night's Dream	Demetrius	L.A. Theatre Works, Los Angeles, United States
2016	God of Carnage	Alan	L.A. Theatre Works, Los Angeles, United States
2018	Lenin's Embalmers	Boris	L.A. Theatre Works, Los Angeles, United States
2018	It's a Wonderful Life	George Bailey	Pasadena Playhouse, Pasadena, United States
2021	The Murder on the Links	Captain Hastings	L.A. Theatre Works, Los Angeles, United States

== Awards and nominations ==
Year	Award	Nominated work	Category	Result
2010	Teen Choice Awards	The Big Bang Theory	Choice TV: Male Scene Stealer	Nominated
2012	Screen Actors Guild Awards	The Big Bang Theory	Outstanding Performance by an Ensemble in a Comedy Series	Nominated
2013	Critics' Choice Television Awards	The Big Bang Theory	Best Supporting Actor in a Comedy Series	Won
2013	Screen Actors Guild Awards	The Big Bang Theory	Outstanding Performance by an Ensemble in a Comedy Series	Nominated
2014	Screen Actors Guild Awards	The Big Bang Theory	Outstanding Performance by an Ensemble in a Comedy Series	Nominated
2015	Screen Actors Guild Awards	The Big Bang Theory	Outstanding Performance by an Ensemble in a Comedy Series	Nominated
2015	Teen Choice Awards	The Big Bang Theory	Choice TV: Chemistry	Nominated
2016	Screen Actors Guild Awards	The Big Bang Theory	Outstanding Performance by an Ensemble in a Comedy Series	Nominated
2017	Screen Actors Guild Awards	The Big Bang Theory	Outstanding Performance by an Ensemble in a Comedy Series	Nominated
2017	Golden Globe Awards	Florence Foster Jenkins	Best Supporting Actor – Motion Picture	Nominated
2017	Santa Barbara International Film Festival	Florence Foster Jenkins	Virtuosos Award	Won
2024	Astra TV Awards	Poker Face	Best Guest Actor in a Comedy Series	Nominated
