= Annette (film) =

2021 musical film by Leos Carax

- Theatrical release poster
- Directed by: Leos Carax
- Story by: Ron Mael; Russell Mael
- Produced by: Charles Gillibert; Paul-Dominique Win Vacharasinthu; Adam Driver
- Starring: Adam Driver; Marion Cotillard; Simon Helberg; Devyn McDowell; Angèle
- Cinematography: Caroline Champetier
- Edited by: Nelly Quettier
- Music by: Sparks; Lyrics: Ron Mael; Russell Mael; Leos Carax
- Production companies: CG Cinema International; Tribus P Films International; Arte France Cinéma; Theo Films; UGC; Detailfilm; Scope Pictures; Wrong Men; RTBF (Télévision Belge); Eurospace; Piano; Garidi Films
- Distributed by: UGC Distribution (France); September Film (Belgium); Alamode Film (Germany); Filmcoopi Zürich (Switzerland); Amazon Studios (United States); Mubi (Mexico); Eurospace (Japan)
- Release dates: 6 July 2021 (Cannes); 7 July 2021 (France); 20 August 2021 (United States); 26 November 2021 (Mexico); 16 December 2021 (Germany)
- Running time: 140 minutes
- Countries: France; Germany; Belgium; United States; Japan; Mexico; Switzerland
- Language: English
- Budget: $15.5 million
- Box office: $3.7 million

Annette is a 2021 musical romantic drama film directed by Leos Carax in his English-language directorial debut. The film's story and music were written by Ron Mael, Russell Mael, with lyrics co-written by Carax. The film, which has been described as a rock opera, follows a stand-up comedian (Adam Driver) and his opera singer wife (Marion Cotillard), and how their lives are changed when they have their first child. Simon Helberg and Devyn McDowell also appear.

An international co-production between France, Germany, Switzerland, Belgium, the United States, Mexico and Japan, Annette was premiered on 6 July 2021 as the opening film at the 2021 Cannes Film Festival, where Carax received the Best Director award. It was released in France the next day by UGC Distribution and in the United States on 20 August by Amazon Studios. The film received positive reviews from critics.

== Plot ==
The film's cast and crew appear out of character, asking "may we start?" After a swift courtship, provocative stand-up comedian Henry McHenry publicly declares his engagement to world-famous soprano Ann Desfranoux. Shortly afterwards, Ann gives birth to their daughter Annette, portrayed by a wooden, lifelike marionette puppet. The marriage becomes rocky when Henry begins to take care of Annette while Ann's career flourishes and takes her overseas.

Later, Ann has dreams about six women who come forward with allegations of past abuse at the hands of Henry and nightmares about Henry almost killing her. Back home, Henry's career begins to spiral, exacerbated by an onstage meltdown, and he comes to resent Ann's continued success. The two schedule a private cruise with the goal of mending their relationship. However, the cruise ends in disaster when Ann falls overboard during a stormy night after Henry drunkenly forces her to waltz with him. After realizing that his wife is dead, Henry and Annette get to an island using a lifeboat. There, both fall asleep, when Ann's ghost suddenly appears and gives her voice to infant Annette as a form of revenge, so she can haunt Henry.

Though cleared of legal suspicion for Ann's death, Henry finds himself at a financial dead-end without her income. Henry learns that "Baby Annette" can miraculously sing. He contacts Ann's former accompanist, suggesting they use her gift for a musical act. The accompanist reluctantly agrees, having been in love with Ann. Annette, singing and "real[ly]" floating over the stage, becomes a worldwide hit. Henry continues to drink heavily and stay out late, haunted by memories of Ann. One night, when returning home, Henry overhears Annette singing a rendition of "We Love Each Other So Much", which was Ann and Henry's song. He confronts the accompanist, who implies that he is Annette's real father. In retaliation, Henry drowns him in the backyard pool, witnessed by Annette from her bedroom window. Henry plans one final performance at the "Hyperbowl" halftime show, but Annette does not sing. She eventually declares "Daddy kills people" to the packed stadium. Henry is tried and convicted, amid a vision of Anne.

A few years later, Annette visits her father in prison. A living human girl suddenly appears, approaching the puppet and then replacing it on a chair. She denies Henry's attempts of reconciliation and blames her mother for using her to get revenge. She insists, in song, that she will never sing again. Annette tells him that he now has "nothing to love". After the living Annette leaves, the Annette puppet lies lifeless on the floor.

In the credits, the actors and crew "bid you goodnight."

== Cast ==
- Adam Driver as Henry McHenry
- Marion Cotillard as Ann Defrasnoux
  - Catherine Trottmann as Ann's singing soprano voice
- Simon Helberg as The Accompanist
- Devyn McDowell as Annette
  - Hebe Griffiths as the singing voice of Annette's puppet form.
- Angèle, Kiko Mizuhara, Julia Bullock, Claron McFadden, Noémie Schellens and Natalie Mendoza as the Six Accuser Chorus
- Natalia Lafourcade as LAPD Police Officer
- Kanji Furutachi as Doctor
- Rila Fukushima, Eva Van Der Gucht and Laura Jansen as Nurses
- Rebecca Sjöwall as Connie O'Connor
- Nino Porzio as Sheriff Garoni
- Davide Jakubowski as Sheriff Humprey
- Wim Opbrouck as Baby Annette announcer
- Colin Lainchbury-Brown as Hyperbowl announcer
- Geoffrey Carey as Ape of God announcer
- Yasin Islek as Dubai Singer Faruq
- Russell Mael as Russell Mael/Jet pilot
- Ron Mael as Ron Mael/Jet pilot
- Leos Carax as Leos Carax
- Nastya Golubeva Carax as Nastya
- Rebecca Dyson-Smith and Graciela María as Photographers

== Production ==
It was announced in November 2016 that Carax was set to make his first English language film, with Adam Driver, Rooney Mara and Rihanna in talks to star in the film. Filming was scheduled to begin in spring 2017. In March 2017, Amazon Studios acquired the film, but Mara and Rihanna were not involved in the project. Carax originally envisioned Joaquin Phoenix for the role of Henry McHenry; he was scheduled to meet with Carax, but was too shy. In May, Michelle Williams was cast to replace Mara, with filming then due to begin in July. Production on the film stalled, with the screenwriters Ron and Russell Mael attributing the delay to Driver's commitments to Star Wars. Filming was moved to begin in summer 2019.

Development resumed on the project in May 2019, with Marion Cotillard now cast to replace Williams. In October 2019, Simon Helberg joined the cast.

Filming began in August 2019, with shooting taking place in Los Angeles, Brussels and Bruges and at locations in Germany including Münster, Cologne and Bonn. Production concluded in November 2019. In January 2020, it was announced that the Belgian singer Angèle was cast in an undisclosed role.

== Music ==
The first song from the score and soundtrack, "So May We Start", was released as a single on 28 May 2021.

The film's stars, while not trained, do most of their own singing. Cotillard has sung in previous film roles and has had a musical career outside film, and Driver has sung in previous film roles as well.

A second single, "We Love Each Other So Much", was released via streaming on 25 June 2021. The soundtrack Annette (Cannes Edition – Selections from the Motion Picture Soundtrack) was released on CD and vinyl on MasterWorks / Milan label by Sony Music: it contains 15 tracks. The Unlimited Edition: The Original Movie Soundtrack was released digitally and as a double CD shortly after and contains virtually all of the music from the movie as well as demos.

== Release ==
Annette debuted at the Cannes Film Festival on 6 July 2021. and was released in France the same day by UGC Distribution.

The film was given a limited North American theatrical release on 6 August 2021 before digital streaming on Amazon Prime Video on 20 August 2021.

In June 2021, the film's UK and Ireland distribution rights were acquired by the streaming service MUBI. It was also selected in the 'Gala Presentation' section of 26th Busan International Film Festival.

== Reception ==
The review aggregator website Rotten Tomatoes reports an approval rating of 72% based on 274 reviews, and an average rating of 6.7/10. The website's critics consensus reads, "Annette's experimental approach to its emotional extremes marks an ambitious, if not peculiar, return for director Leos Carax." On Metacritic, the film has a weighted average score of 67 out of 100, based on 51 critics, indicating "generally favorable reviews". Annette was a NYT Critics' Pick; reviewer A. O. Scott described it as a "highly cerebral, formally complex film about unbridled emotion" that "masters its own paradoxes. [...] A work of art propelled by a skepticism about where art comes from and why we value it the way we do. A fantastical film that attacks some of our culture’s most cherished fantasies. Utterly unreal and completely truthful."

In June 2025, IndieWire ranked the film at number 81 on its list of "The 100 Best Movies of the 2020s (So Far)", while filmmaker John Waters cited it as among his favorites of the 21st century.

=== Accolades ===
Award	Date of ceremony	Category	Recipient(s)	Result	Ref.
Cannes Film Festival	17 July 2021	Best Director	Leos Carax	Won	
Cannes Film Festival	17 July 2021	Palme d'Or	Annette	Nominated	
Florida Film Critics Circle	21 December 2021	Best Picture	Annette	Runner-up	
Florida Film Critics Circle	21 December 2021	Best Director	Leos Carax	Runner-up	
Florida Film Critics Circle	21 December 2021	Best Actor	Adam Driver	Won	
Florida Film Critics Circle	21 December 2021	Best Original Screenplay	Leos Carax, Ron Mael and Russell Mael	Runner-up	
Florida Film Critics Circle	21 December 2021	Best Art Direction/Production Design	Annette	Nominated	
Florida Film Critics Circle	21 December 2021	Best Visual Effects	Annette	Runner-up	
Florida Film Critics Circle	21 December 2021	Best Score	Ron Mael and Russell Mael	Nominated	
Golden Globe Awards	January 9, 2022	Best Actress in a Motion Picture – Comedy or Musical	Marion Cotillard	Nominated	
Lumière Awards	January 17, 2022	Best Film	Charles Gillibert, Paul-Dominique Win Vacharasinthu, Adam Driver, and Leos Carax	Nominated	
Lumière Awards	January 17, 2022	Best Director	Leos Carax	Won	
Lumière Awards	January 17, 2022	Best Cinematography	Caroline Champetier	Won	
Lumière Awards	January 17, 2022	Best Music	Ron Mael and Russell Mael	Won	
César Awards	February 25, 2022	Best Film	Charles Gillibert, Paul-Dominique Win Vacharasinthu, and Leos Carax	Nominated	
César Awards	February 25, 2022	Best Director	Leos Carax	Won	
César Awards	February 25, 2022	Best Actor	Adam Driver	Nominated	
César Awards	February 25, 2022	Best Original Screenplay	Leos Carax, Ron Mael, and Russell Mael	Nominated	
César Awards	February 25, 2022	Best Cinematography	Caroline Champetier	Nominated	
César Awards	February 25, 2022	Best Editing	Nelly Quettier	Won	
César Awards	February 25, 2022	Best Sound	Erwan Kerzanet, Katia Boutin, Maxence Dussère, Paul Heymans, and Thomas Gauder	Won	
César Awards	February 25, 2022	Best Original Music	Ron Mael and Russell Mael	Won	
César Awards	February 25, 2022	Best Costume Design	Pascaline Chavanne	Nominated	
César Awards	February 25, 2022	Best Production Design	Florian Sanson	Nominated	
César Awards	February 25, 2022	Best Visual Effects	Guillaume Pondard	Won	
Gaudí Awards	March 6, 2022	Best European Film	Annette	Nominated	

"So May We Start" was shortlisted for the Academy Award for Best Original Song, but not nominated.
