= Glen Campbell videography =

Glen Campbell video discography
- Video albums: 15
- Music videos: 22
- Other video albums: 26

American country music singer Glen Campbell released fifteen video albums and was featured in twenty-one music videos in his lifetime. His first two music videos, "By the Time I Get to Phoenix" and "Wichita Lineman", were directed by Gene Weed in 1967 and 1968 respectively. Campbell released his final music video, "I'm Not Gonna Miss You", in 2014 to coincide with the release of the documentary Glen Campbell: I'll Be Me.

== Music videos ==
Year	Video	Director
1967	"By the Time I Get to Phoenix"	Gene Weed
1968	"Wichita Lineman"	Gene Weed
1969	"Galveston"	
1969	"Try a Little Kindness"	
1969	"Where's the Playground Suzie"	
1970	"Honey Come Back"	
1975	"Rhinestone Cowboy"	
1977	"Southern Nights"	
1984	"A Lady Like You"	
1985	"(Love Always) Letter to Home"	
1985	"It's Just a Matter of Time"	
1986	"Cowpoke"	
1986	"Call Home"	
1988	"Light Years"	Michael Salomon
1991	"Livin' in a House Full of Love"	Dan Kuenster
1995	"Come Harvest Time"	Stan Moore
2002	"Rhinestone Cowboy (Giddy Up, Giddy Up)" (Rikki and Dazz feat. Glen Campbell)	
2008	"Sing"	George Dougherty
2008	"These Days"	George Dougherty
2011	"A Better Place"	George Dougherty
2011	"Ghost on the Canvas"	Kii Arens/Jason Trucco
2012	"A Better Place"	Kii Arens/Jason Trucco
2013	"Hey Little One"	Kii Arens
2014	"I'm Not Gonna Miss You"	James Keach

== Video albums ==
Below are listed the original videos and DVDs that have been released by Glen Campbell.

Year	Video	Label	Format
1985	An Evening with Glen Campbell and the Royal Philharmonic	Prism	VHS
1986	Glen Campbell Live	Channel 5	VHS
1990	The Glen Campbell Goodtime Hour with Special Guest Stars: John Wayne, Tim Conway, Carol Burnett, Three Dog Night	Family of Stars Video	VHS
1990	The Glen Campbell Music Show with Special Guest Star: Roger Miller	Family of Stars Video	VHS
1990	The Glen Campbell Music Show with Special Guest Star: Willie Nelson	Family of Stars Video	VHS
1991	Live at the Dome	Castle	VHS
1994	Branson Video Classics Glen Campbell Goodtime Show	Venture Entertainment	VHS
1996	Christmas with Glen Campbell	Laserlight	VHS
2001	Glen Campbell in Concert	Image Entertainment	VHS, DVD
2007	Good Times Again	TIME LIFE	DVD
2007	Best of The Glen Campbell Music Show	RPM Productions	DVD
2007	Glen Campbell and Friends	ILC Media	DVD
2011	Through the Years Live - Ultimate Collection	Full Fill	DVD
2012	Glen Campbell and Jimmy Webb In Session	Fantasy	DVD
2012	Glen Campbell American Treasure	Surfdog	DVD
2015	Glen Campbell Goodtime Hour Christmas Specials	Shout!Factory	DVD
2016	Glen Campbell Goodtime Hour Country Special	Shout!Factory	DVD

== Other video album appearances ==
Below are listed videos and DVDs by other/various artists on which Glen Campbell is (one of) the main performer(s) on one or several songs.

Year	Video	Artist	Songs	Label
1981	A Celebration: Tribute to Dorsey Burnette [1980]	Various Artists	"Rhinestone Cowboy" (Larry Weiss) "Hey Little One" "Highwayman" "Southern Nights"	Monterey Home Video
198?	World of Wildlife Vol. 1: The Incredible Flight of the Snow Geese & Leopard Of The Wild [1973/1979]		"Fly High And Free" theme song for 1973 wildlife documentary "The Incredible Flight of the Snow Geese" narrated by Glen Campbell	RCA
1993	Branson Live on Stage	Various Artists	"Gentle on My Mind"	Westgate Entertainment Group
1999	It's Branson	Various Artists	"By the Time I Get to Phoenix" "Rhinestone Cowboy"	Reader's Digest
1999	Ryman Country Homecoming Vol. 1	Various Artists	"Gentle on My Mind" "Cryin'"	Coming Home
1999	Ryman Country Homecoming Vol. 2	Various Artists	"Rhinestone Cowboy"	Coming Home
2000	Ryman Country Homecoming Vol. 3	Various Artists	"By the Time I Get to Phoenix"	Coming Home
2000	Ralph Emery's Country Homecoming	Various Artists	"Southern Nights"	Coming Home
2000	Country Legends Homecoming	Various Artists	"Dream Baby"	Coming Home
2001	Ralph Emery and Friends	Various Artists	"It's Only Make Believe"; Wichita Lineman	Coming Home
2001	All Star Jam	Various Artists	"Highwayman" with Kris Kristofferson "Galveston"	Coming Home
2002	Rhinestone Cowboy (Giddy Up, Giddy Up)	Rikki & Daz featuring Glen Campbell	"Rhinestone Cowboy (Giddy Up, Giddy Up)	Image Entertainment
2003	Thank You	Stone Temple Pilots	"Wichita Lineman" with the Stone Temple Pilots	Atlantic
2004	Hallelujah Gospel [1984]	Various Artists	"He" "When Can Brown Begin" "A Few Good Men"	Image Entertainment
2004	Country Legends: When They Were Rising Stars [1967]	Various Artists	"Gentle On My Mind" "By The Time I Get To Phoenix" "Cripple Creek" "A Satisfied Mind" "Burning Bridges" "White Lightning" "Good Old Mountain Dew" "Only The Lonely"	Delta Music
2006	Unique Voices - 40 Years of Ovation Guitars	Glen Campbell, Steve Lukather, Melissa Etheridge, others	Excerpt from "Baby Don't Think Twice"; Excerpt from "You've Lost That Lovin' Feelin'"; Jam session with Steve Lukather	Ovation
2006	The Sonny & Cher Collection: 1977 February The Sonny & Cher Comedy Hour	Sonny & Cher	"Southern Nights"; Glen Campbell solo "Country Boy (You Got Your Feet in LA)" "Don't Pull Your Love" "Rhinestone Cowboy" duets w/ Cher	
2006	Country Greats	Various Artists	"Letter to Home"	MCP
2007	John Wayne's Tribute to America [1970]	Various Artists	"This Is A Great Country"	MPI
2007	The Captain & Tennille Songbook [1979]	Captain & Tennille	"I'm Gonna Love You" "Feels Like A Man" duet with Toni Tennille	Retroactive Entertainment
2007	The Johnny Cash TV Show 1969-1971	Johnny Cash and others	"Wichita Lineman"	Sony Columbia Legacy
2007	Legends of Country: Classic Hits of 50s, 60s and 70s	Various Artists	"Southern Nights" "Rhinestone Cowboy" "Wichita Lineman" "Galveston"	Shout! Factory
2010	Country's Greatest Stars Live Vol. 1	Various Artists	"Rhinestone Cowboy" "Back in the Saddle Again" "Bye Bye Love" duet with Ray Charles "Medley: Gentle on My Mind/Honey Come Back/By the Time I Get to Phoenix/Wichita Lineman/Galveston/Country Boy (You Got Your Feet In L.A.)" "Medley: Hey Good Lookin’/Your Cheatin’ Heart/Cold, Cold Heart/I'm So Lonesome I Could Cry/I Can't Help It (If I'm Still in Love with You)/You Win Again/I'm So Lonesome I Could Cry/I Saw the Light/Jambalaya"; Glen Campbell, Roy Clark, Dolly Parton	Shout! Factory
2010	Tonight - 4 Decades of The Tonight Show Starring Johnny Carson	Various Artists	"Rhinestone Cowboy" "Marie"	Respond2 Entertainment
2011	The Rich Little Show	Various Artists	"Rhinestone Cowboy"	MPI
2013	Burt Bacharach's Best	Various Artists	"I'll Never Fall In Love Again" duet with Dionne Warwick	PBS

== Detail information per original release ==
An Evening with Glen Campbell and the Royal Philharmonic

Video by Glen Campbell
- Released: 1985
- Recorded: April 2, 1977
- Genre: Country
- Length: 90:00
- Label: Prism

=== An Evening with Glen Campbell and the Royal Philharmonic ===
An Evening with Glen Campbell and the Royal Philharmonic was recorded at The Royal Festival Hall in London on April 2, 1977, by BBC television. The video was released in 1985.

==== Track listing ====
1. "Stars/Rhinestone Cowboy" (Janis Ian/Larry Weiss)
2. "Dreams of the Everyday Housewife" (Chris Gantry)
3. "Where's The Playground Suzie" (Jimmy Webb)
4. "If You Go Away" (Rod McKuen/Jacques Brel)
5. "Wichita Lineman" (Jimmy Webb)
6. Medley:" (Brian Wilson/Mike Love/Chuck Berry)
  1. "Good Vibrations"
  2. "Help Me Rhonda"
  3. "Surfer Girl"
  4. "Surfin' U.S.A."
7. "Turn Around, Look at Me" (Jerry Capehart/Glen Campbell)
8. "Try A Little Kindness" (Curt Sapaugh/Bobby Austin)
9. "Didn't We" (Jimmy Webb) (vocal - Jimmy Webb)
10. "Soliloquy From Carousel" (Richard Rodgers/Oscar Hammerstein)
11. "That's When The Music Takes Me" (Neil Sedaka)
12. "Streets Of London" (Ralph McTell)
13. "Classical Gas" (Mason Williams)
14. "William Tell Overture" (G. Rossini/arr. by Glen Campbell/Dennis McCarthy)
15. "Southern Nights" (Allen Toussaint)
16. "God Only Knows" (Brian Wilson/Asher)
17. "By The Time I Get To Phoenix" (Jimmy Webb)
18. "Galveston" (Jimmy Webb)
19. "This Is Sarah's Song" (Jimmy Webb)
20. "MacArthur Park" (Jimmy Webb)
21. "Amazing Grace" (John Newton)

==== Personnel ====
- Glen Campbell - vocals, acoustic guitar, electric guitar, bagpipes
- George Green - drums
- Carl Jackson - acoustic guitar, electric guitar, banjo
- T.J. Kuenster - piano
- Bill McCubbin - bass guitar
- Fred Tackett - acoustic guitar
- Background vocals - Billie Barnum, Ann White, Stephanie Spruill
- The Royal Philharmonic Orchestra
- Conducted by Allen Aynsworth and Jimmy Webb

==== Production ====
- Package design - Prism Entertainment Corp.

Glen Campbell Live

Video by Glen Campbell
- Released: 1986
- Recorded: 1981
- Genre: Country
- Length: 60:00
- Label: Channel 5
- Producer: Jeffrey Kruger

=== Glen Campbell Live ===
Glen Campbell Live was taped during a 1981 concert in Dublin. The double album Glen Campbell Live has a similar set-list, but was not recorded at the same event.

==== Track listing ====
1. "Rhinestone Cowboy" (Larry Weiss)
2. "Gentle On My Mind" (John Hartford)
3. "Medley"
  1. "Wichita Lineman" (Jimmy Webb)
  2. "Galveston" (Jimmy Webb)
  3. "Country Boy (You Got Your Feet In LA)" (Dennis Lambert/Brian Potter)
4. "By The Time I Get To Phoenix" (Jimmy Webb)
5. "Heartache #3" (Steve Hardin)
6. "Please Come To Boston (Dave Loggins)
7. "Trials And Tribulations" (Micheal Smotherman)
8. "Foggy Mountain Breakdown" (Earl Scruggs)
9. "Milk Cow Blues" (Arnold)
10. "I'm So Lonesome I Could Cry" (Hank Williams)
11. "Southern Nights" (Allen Toussaint)
12. "Amazing Grace" (John Newton)
13. "Try A Little Kindness" (Sapaugh/Austin)
14. "Mull Of Kintyre" (Paul McCartney/Denny Laine)

==== Personnel ====
- Glen Campbell - vocals, acoustic guitar, electric guitar, bagpipes
- Kim Darrigan - bass guitar
- Craig Fall - acoustic guitar, electric guitar, keyboards
- Steve Hardin - vocals, keyboards, harmonica
- Carl Jackson - vocals, acoustic guitar, electric guitar, fiddle, banjo
- T.J. Kuenster - vocals, piano
- Steve Turner - drums

==== Production ====
- Executive producer - Jeffrey Kruger
- Production assistant - Patricia Swan
- Director - Anne McCabe
- Technical supervisor - Jerry Hayes
- Cameras - Michael Tormey
- Sound - Peter Fletcher
- Electrical supervision - Liam McDonough
- Lighting - Tommy Mulligan
- Floor manager - Ronnie Patterson
- Unit manager - John Dunne
- Make up - Marese Smyth
- A Wienerworld production

The Glen Campbell Goodtime Hour with Special Guest Stars: John Wayne, Tim Conway, Carol Burnett, Three Dog Night

Video by Glen Campbell
- Released: 1990
- Recorded: Recorded at CBS Television City, Hollywood, CA, September 2, 1971
- Genre: Country
- Label: Family of Stars Video
- Producers: Jack Shea, Rich Eustis, Al Rogers

=== The Glen Campbell Goodtime Hour with Special Guest Stars: John Wayne, Tim Conway, Carol Burnett, Three Dog Night ===
The Glen Campbell Goodtime Hour with Special Guest Stars: John Wayne, Tim Conway, Carol Burnett, Three Dog Night contains an episode of The Glen Campbell Goodtime Hour. This video was released in 1990 as part of The Glen Campbell Video Collection. This collection also included The Glen Campbell Music Show with Special Guest Star: Roger Miller and The Glen Campbell Music Show with Special Guest Star: Willie Nelson.

==== Song selections ====
1. "Sooner or Later" (Gary Zekley, Mitchell Bottler, Adenyi Jacob Paris, Ekundayo Paris, Ted McNamara)
2. "Joy to the World" (Hoyt Axton) (performed by Three Dog Night and Glen Campbell)
3. "(They Long to Be) Close to You" (Burt Bacharach, Hal David)
4. "An Old Fashioned Love Song" (Paul Williams) (performed by Three Dog Night)
5. "Put Your Hand in the Hand" (Gene MacLellan) (performed by the Mike Curb Congregation)
6. "Take Me Home, Country Roads" (Bill Danoff, Taffy Nivert, John Denver) (performed by Jerry Reed and Glen Campbell)
7. "Ko-Ko Joe" (Jerry Reed) (performed by Jerry Reed)
8. "He Ain't Heavy, He's My Brother" (Bob Russell, Bobby Scott)

==== Personnel ====
- Glen Campbell - vocals, acoustic guitar, electric guitar
- Jerry Reed - vocals, acoustic guitar
- Larry McNeely - banjo, acoustic guitar
- Mike Curb Congregation

==== Production ====
- Executive producer - Neck Sevano
- Director - Jack Shea
- Writers - Coslough Johnson, Marty Leshner, Bob Arnott, John Bradford, Sandy Krinski, Frank Shaw, Ray Jessel, Rich Eustis, Al Rogers
- Music conductor - Marty Paich
- Production Consultant - Jerry McPhie
- Cover art - Marlene Bergman
- Recorded at CBS Television City, Hollywood, CA, September 2, 1971
- Family Of Stars Video, distributed by Paul Brownstein Productions
- Copyright 1971 Glenco Productions, Inc.

The Glen Campbell Music Show with Special Guest Star: Roger Miller

Video by Glen Campbell
- Released: 1990
- Recorded: 1982
- Genre: Country
- Length: 30:00
- Label: Family of Stars Video
- Producer: Bob Henry

=== The Glen Campbell Music Show with Special Guest Star: Roger Miller ===
The Glen Campbell Music Show with Special Guest Star: Roger Miller is an episode of the 30 minute syndicated television show The Glen Campbell Music Show which ran between 1982 and 1983. This video was released in 1990 as part of The Glen Campbell Video Collection. This collection also included The Glen Campbell Music Show with Special Guest Star: Willie Nelson and The Glen Campbell Goodtime Hour with Special Guest Stars: John Wayne, Tim Conway, Carol Burnett, Three Dog Night.

==== Track listing ====
1. "Southern Nights" (Allen Toussaint)
2. "Goin' Back To Alabam " (Copas)
3. "By The Time I Get To Phoenix" (Jimmy Webb)
4. "It's Your World" (Steve Hardin)
5. "King Of The Road" (Roger Miller) (vocal - Roger Miller)
6. "Medley:" (vocals - Roger Miller and Glen Campbell)
  1. In The Summertime" (Roger Miller)
  2. "Dang Me" (Roger Miller)
  3. "England Swings" (Roger Miller)

==== Personnel ====
- Glen Campbell - acoustic guitar, electric guitar
- Kim Darrigan - bass guitar, bass fiddle
- Craig Fall - acoustic guitar, electric guitar, keyboards
- Steve Hardin - vocals, harmonica, keyboards
- Carl Jackson - vocals, banjo, acoustic guitar, electric guitar, fiddle, mandolin
- T. J. Kuenster - vocals, acoustic piano, electric piano
- Steve Turner - drums

==== Production ====
- Executive producer - Pierre Cossette
- Producer/director - Bob Henry
- Cover art design - Marlene Bergman
- Music clearance - Suzy Vaughn Associates
- A production of Gaylord Entertainment Television and The Glen Campbell Company, 1982

The Glen Campbell Music Show with Special Guest Star: Willie Nelson

Video by Glen Campbell
- Released: 1990
- Recorded: 1982
- Genre: Country
- Length: 30:00
- Label: Family of Stars Video
- Producer: Bob Henry

=== Glen Campbell Music Show with Special Guest Star: Willie Nelson ===
The Glen Campbell Music Show with Special Guest Star: Willie Nelson is an episode of the 30 minute syndicated television show The Glen Campbell Music Show which ran between 1982 and 1983. This video was released in 1990 as part of The Glen Campbell Video Collection. This collection also included The Glen Campbell Music Show with Special Guest Star: Roger Miller and The Glen Campbell Goodtime Hour with Special Guest Stars: John Wayne, Tim Conway, Carol Burnett, Three Dog Night.

==== Track listing ====
1. "On The Road Again" (Willie Nelson) (vocals Glen Campbell and Willie Nelson)
2. "Always On My Mind" (Willie Nelson) (vocal Willie Nelson)
3. "Crazy" (Nelson)
4. "Just To Satisfy You" (Jennings/Bowman) (vocals Glen Campbell and Willie Nelson)
5. "Mama Don't Let Your Babies Grow Up To Be Cowboys" (Willie Nelson) (vocals Glen Campbell and Willie Nelson)
6. "Uncloudy Day" (Willie Nelson)
7. "Old Friends" (Roger Miller) (vocals Glen Campbell, Willie Nelson, Roger Miller)

==== Personnel ====
- Glen Campbell - acoustic guitar, electric guitar
- Kim Darrigan - bass guitar, bass fiddle
- Craig Fall - acoustic guitar, electric guitar, keyboards
- Steve Hardin - vocals, harmonica, keyboards
- Carl Jackson - vocals, banjo, acoustic guitar, electric guitar, fiddle, mandolin
- T. J. Kuenster - vocals, acoustic piano, electric piano
- Steve Turner - drums

==== Production ====
- Executive producer - Pierre Cossette
- Producer/director - Bob Henry
- Cover art design - Marlene Bergman
- Music clearance - Suzy Vaughn Associates
- A production of Gaylord Entertainment Television and The Glen Campbell Company, 1982

Live at the Dome

Video by Glen Campbell
- Released: 1991
- Recorded: 1990
- Genre: Country
- Label: Castle

=== Live at the Dome ===
Live at the Dome contains a live concert by Glen Campbell and the Jeff Dayton Band. The concert was taped at The Dome in Doncaster, England in 1990. In 2011 for the first time the concert was released in CD format, as part of the boxset Through the Years Live - Ultimate Collection.

==== Track listing ====
1. "Rhinestone Cowboy" (Larry Weiss)
2. "Galveston" (Jimmy Webb)
3. "By The Time I Get To Phoenix" (Jimmy Webb)
4. "Try A Little Kindness" (Curt Sapaugh/Bobby Austin)
5. "Wichita Lineman" (Jimmy Webb)
6. "She's Gone, Gone, Gone" (Harlan Howard)
7. "Walkin' In The Sun" (Jeff Barry)
8. "On A Good Night" (Jim Weatherly/Keith Stegall)
9. "True Grit" (Don Black/Elmer Bernstein)
10. "The Hand That Rocks The Cradle" (Ted Harris)
11. "I Remember You" (Johnny Mercer/Victor Schertzinger)
12. "I'm a One-Woman Man" (Tillman Franks/Johnny Horton)
13. "Orange Blossom Special " (E. Rouse)
14. "Highwayman" (Jimmy Webb)
15. "The Streets Of London" (Ralph McTell)
16. "A Thing Called Love" (Jerry R. Hubbard)
17. "Southern Nights" (Allen Toussaint)
18. "William Tell Overture" (G. Rossini)
19. "Medley" (Brian Wilson/Mike Love/Chuck Berry)
  1. "Good Vibrations"
  2. "California Girls"
  3. "Fun Fun Fun"
  4. "I Get Around"
  5. "Surfin' USA"
20. "Amazing Grace" (John Newton)
21. "Mull Of Kintyre" (Paul McCartney/Denny Laine)
22. "Gentle On my Mind" (John Hartford)

==== Personnel ====
- Glen Campbell - vocals, acoustic guitar, electric guitar, bagpipes
- Tom Benton - backing vocals, drums
- John Berafatto - piano
- Arvel Byrd - fiddle
- Jeff Dayton - backing vocal, acoustic guitar, electric guitar
- Bob Henke - backing vocals, bass guitar
- Kenny Skaggs - backing vocals, steel guitar, mandolin, tambourine

Branson Video Classics Glen Campbell Goodtime Show

Video by Glen Campbell
- Released: 1994
- Recorded: 1994, The Glen Campbell Goodtime Theater, Branson, MO
- Genre: Country
- Label: Ventura Entertainment Group

=== Branson Video Classics Glen Campbell Goodtime Show ===
A 1994 live performance by Glen Campbell recorded in The Glen Campbell Goodtime Theater in Branson, Missouri

==== Track listing ====
1. "Gentle On My Mind" (John Hartford)
2. "By The Time I Get To Phoenix" (Jimmy Webb)
3. "Kentucky Means Paradise" (Merle Travis)
4. "Wichita Lineman" (Jimmy Webb)
5. "Galveston" (Jimmy Webb)
6. "Mansion In Branson" (Paul Overstreet)
7. "Why Haven't I Heard From You" (Knox/T.W. Cale) (vocal Debby Campbell)
8. "The Boy In Me" (Kevin Stokes/Geoff Thurman)
9. "Try A Little Kindness" (Kurt Sapaugh/Bobby Austin) (duet with Campbell Sisters)
10. "Classical Gas" (Mason Williams)
11. "Cowboy Jubilee " (Gene Autry) (T.J. Kuenster/Goodtime Band/Matthew Dickins Dancers)
12. "Rhinestone Cowboy" (Larry Weiss)
13. "Medley":
  1. "It's Only Make Believe" (Jack Nance/Conway Twitty)
  2. "Turn Around Look At Me" (Jerry Capehart/Glen Campbell)
  3. "Where's The Playground Suzie" (Jimmy Webb)
  4. "Hey Little One " (Dorsey Burnette/Barry De Vorzon)
  5. "Country Boy (You Got Your Feet In L.A.) (Dennis Lambert/Brian Potter)
  6. "Mary In The Morning" (J. Cymbal/M. Lendell)
  7. "Dreams Of The Everyday Housewife" (Chris Gantry)
  8. "Sunflower" (Neil Diamond)
14. "Let It Be Me" (M. Curtis/G. Becaud) (duet with Debby Campbell)
15. "No More Night" (Walt Harrah)
16. "Southern Nights" (Allen Toussaint)

==== Personnel ====
- Glen Campbell - vocals, acoustic guitar, electric guitar
- Debby Campbell - vocals
- Gary Brusesse - drums, vocals
- Jeff Dayton - electric guitar, acoustic guitar, vocals
- Noel Kirkland - fiddle, banjo, keyboards
- T.J. Kuenster - musical director, piano, vocals
- Kenny Skaggs - acoustic guitar, mandolin, dobro, steel guitar, backing vocals
- Russ Skaggs - bass guitar, backing vocals

==== Production ====
- Video-taped at The Glen Campbell Goodtime Theatre, Branson, MO
- Produced and distributed by Ventura Entertainment Group, LTD, 1994

Christmas with Glen Campbell

Video by Glen Campbell
- Released: 1996
- Genre: Country
- Label: Laserlight

=== Christmas with Glen Campbell ===
Christmas with Glen Campbell contains various Christmas songs and skits from The Glen Campbell Goodtime Hour prefaced by an introduction by Glen Campbell himself which was filmed backstage at the Glen Campbell Goodtime Theater in 1996. This video was only sold at this theater and by mail order from there.

==== Track listing ====
1. "The Christmas Song"
2. "Christmas Wishes" (Anne Murray)
3. "A Winter Wonderland" (with Anne Murray)
4. "Jingle Bells" (with Chorus)
5. "Bless This House" (with Chorus)
6. "Little Toy Trains"
7. "There's No Place Like Home"
- Includes various comedy skits featuring George Gobel, Shecky Greene, Larry McNeely, Mel Tillis and Dom DeLuise.

==== Production ====
- Design - N. Comerford
- Artist Photo - John Russell
- 1996 Delta Music, Inc.
- Licensed from Glen Campbell Enterprises

Glen Campbell in Concert

Video by Glen Campbell
- Released: 2001
- Recorded: January 10 and 11, 2001, The Washington Pavilion of Arts and Sciences, Sioux Falls, SD
- Genre: Country
- Label: Image Entertainment
- Producers: Martin Fischer, Glen Campbell

Professional ratings
Review scores
Source	Rating
Allmovie	link
Allmusic	link

=== Glen Campbell in Concert ===
Glen Campbell in Concert captures a concert by Glen Campbell with the South Dakota Symphony Orchestra, performed in The Great Hall of The Washington Pavilion of Arts and Sciences, Sioux Falls, South Dakota on January 10 and 11, 2001. The concert was initially recorded for the PBS television special "Glen Campbell - In Concert", which aired in March 2001. PBS offered a video of the concert for fundraising purposes, including two bonus tracks ("Don't Pull Your Love on Me/Then You Can Tell Me Goodbye" and "MacArthur Park"). In the same year, the CD release followed, including three more bonus tracks ("Time in a Bottle", "Let It Be Me" and "Try a Little Kindness") which was only available as concert merchandise. In March 2002, a generally available DVD of the concert was released including all 22 tracks plus some extra features.

==== Track listing ====
1. "Wichita Lineman" (Jimmy Webb)
2. "Gentle On My Mind" (John Hartford)
3. "Dreams Of The Everyday Housewife" (Chris Gantry)
4. "Highwayman" (Jimmy Webb)
5. "By The Time I Get To Phoenix" (Jimmy Webb)
6. "Classical Gas" (Mason Williams)
7. "It's Only Make Believe" (Conway Twitty/Jack Nance)
8. "Little Green Apples" (Russell)
9. "Southern Nights" (Allen Toussaint)
10. "Rhinestone Cowboy" (Larry Weiss)
11. "Galveston" (Jimmy Webb)
12. "Since I Fell For You" (Johnson)
13. "The Moon Is A Harsh Mistress" (Jimmy Webb)
14. "The William Tell Overture" (Rossini)
15. "True Grit" (Don Black/Elmer Bernstein)
16. "Still Within The Sound Of My Voice" (Jimmy Webb)
17. "Amazing Grace" (John Newton)

Bonus tracks (DVD):

1. "Don't Pull Your Love/Then You Can Tell Me Goodbye" (Dennis Lambert/Brian Potter/John D. Loudermilk)
2. "MacArthur Park" (Jimmy Webb)
3. "Let It Be Me" (Becaud/Kurtz/Leroyer)
4. "Time In A Bottle" (Jim Croce)
5. "Try A Little Kindness" (Sapaugh/Austin)
6. Behind the Scenes
7. Biography
8. Discography
9. Photo Gallery

==== Personnel ====
- Glen Campbell - vocals, acoustic guitar, electric guitar, bagpipes
- Debby Campbell - vocals
- Garry Bruzzese- drums, harmony vocals
- Jeff Dayton - acoustic guitar, electric guitar, harmony vocals
- T. J. Kuenster - conductor, piano
- Ken Skaggs - Acoustic Guitar, mandolin, backing vocals
- Russ Skaggs - bass guitar, backing vocals
- The South Dakota Symphony Orchestra

==== Production ====
- Executive producers - Martin Fischer/Glen Campbell
- Director - Stanley Dorfman
- Program content/artwork - Glen Campbell Enterprises, LTD
- DVD package design - MMI Image Entertainment, INC, Chatsworth, CA
- Recorded for PBS at the Washington Pavilion of Arts and Sciences, Sioux Falls, SD

Good Times Again

Video by Glen Campbell
- Released: 2007
- Genre: Country
- Label: TIME LIFE

Professional ratings
Review scores
Source	Rating
About.com	link

=== Good Times Again ===
Good Times Again contains a selection of solo performances and duets by Glen Campbell taken from The Glen Campbell Goodtime Hour, a weekly CBS television show that ran from January 1969 until June 1972.

==== Track listing ====
1. "Wichita Lineman" (Jimmy Webb)
2. "Comedy Skit" (with The Smothers Brothers)
3. "For Once in My Life" (Miller/Murden)
4. "Carolina in My Mind" (James Taylor) (with Linda Ronstadt)
5. "Cryin' Time" (with Ray Charles)
6. "Let It Be Me" (Becaud/Curtis/Delanoe) (with Bobbie Gentry)
7. "Galveston" (Jimmy Webb)
8. "Louisiana Man" (with Ricky Nelson)
9. "All I Really Want To Do" (Bob Dylan) (with Cher)
10. "Don't Think Twice, It's All Right" (Bob Dylan) (with Anne Murray)
11. "King of the Road" (Roger Miller) (with Roger Miller)
12. "By the Time I Get to Phoenix" (Jimmy Webb)
13. "True Grit" (Don Black/Elmer Bernstein)
14. "Raindrops Keep Falling On My Head" (Burt Bacharach/Hal David) (with B.J. Thomas)
15. "Folsom Prison Blues" (John R. Cash) (with Johnny Cash)
16. "Hello Walls" (Willie Nelson) (with Willie Nelson)
17. "Gentle On My Mind" (John Hartford) (with John Hartford)

==== Production ====
- Cover photo - Getty Images
- High Five Entertainment distributed through Time/Life Video
- Program content copyright 2007 Glen Campbell Enterprises, Ltd.
- Recent introductions of segments recorded by Glen Campbell at the Andy Williams Moon River Theatre, Branson, MO, 2006

Best of The Glen Campbell Music Show

Video by Glen Campbell
- Released: 2007
- Recorded: 1972, 1975, London, 1981, Dublin
- Genre: Country
- Label: RPM Productions

Professional ratings
Review scores
Source	Rating
Allmusic	link

=== Best of The Glen Campbell Music Show ===
Best of The Glen Campbell Music Show contains a selection of performances by Glen Campbell, band and orchestra taken from BBC television shows Glen Campbell From The Talk of the Town (1972) and The Glen Campbell Music Show (1975). Bonus features are a 1975 Glen Campbell Music Show performance with songwriter Jimmy Webb on piano and six songs from the 1981 (not 1978 as is mentioned on the back cover of the DVD) concert in Dublin.

==== Track listing ====
1. "Dream Baby (How Long Must I Dream) (Cindy Walker)
2. "By The Time I Get To Phoenix" (Jimmy Webb)
3. "Mary In The Morning" (Michael Lendell/Johnny Cymbal)
4. "Try A Little Kindness" (Kurt Sapaugh/Bobby Austin)
5. "Gentle On My Mind" (John Hartford)
6. "Ocean In His Eyes" (Jimmy Webb)
7. "Time In A Bottle" (Jim Croce)
8. "Dreams Of The Everyday Housewife" (Chris Gantry)
9. "Help Me Make It Through The Night" (Kris Kristofferson)
10. "Wichita Lineman" (Jimmy Webb)
11. "Galveston" (Jimmy Webb)
12. "Country Boy" (Ricky Skaggs)
13. "Oklahoma Sunday Morning" (Tony Macauley/H. Hazelwood)
14. "It's A Sin When You Love Somebody" (Jimmy Webb)
15. "The Moon's A Harsh Mistress" (Jimmy Webb)
16. "Ain't No Sunshine" (Bill Withers) (instrumental)
17. "Oh Happy Day" (Edwin R. Hawkins)

Bonus Feature 1 Glen Campbell with Jimmy Webb 1975

1. "Medley:"
  1. "By The Time I Get To Phoenix" (Jimmy Webb)
  2. "Wichita Lineman" (Jimmy Webb)
  3. "Galveston" (Jimmy Webb)
  4. "Honey Come Back" (Jimmy Webb)
2. "Didn't We" (Jimmy Webb)
3. MacArthur Park" (Jimmy Webb)

Bonus Feature 2 Glen Campbell Live 1981

1. "Rhinestone Cowboy" (Larry Weiss)
2. "Trials And Tribulations" (Michael Smotherman)
3. "Southern Nights" (Allen Toussaint)
4. "Heartache #3" (Steve Hardin)
5. "I'm So Lonesome I Could Cry" (Hank Williams)
6. "Milk Cow Blues" (Arnold)

==== Personnel ====
- Glen Campbell - vocals, acoustic guitar, electric guitar
- Bob Felts - drums
- Billy Graham - bass guitar, harmony vocals
- Carl Jackson - acoustic guitar, electric guitar, banjo, harmony vocals
- Dennis McCarthy - musical director, keyboards
- Orchestra

Glen Campbell with Jimmy Webb 1975

- Glen Campbell - vocals, electric guitar
- Jimmy Webb - piano
- Orchestra

Glen Campbell Live 1981

- Glen Campbell - vocals, electric guitar, acoustic guitar
- Kim Darrigan - bass guitar
- Craig Fall - acoustic guitar, electric guitar, keyboards
- Steve Hardin - vocals, organ, harmonica
- Carl Jackson - vocals, electric guitar, fiddle, mandolin, banjo
- T.J. Kuenster - vocals, piano
- Steve Turner - drums

==== Production ====
- Manufactured in the EU
- Marketed and distributed by Cherry Red Records, ltd
- An RPM Productions release under license from TKO Licensing ltd, 2006

Glen Campbell and Friends

Video by Glen Campbell
- Released: 2007
- Recorded: April 1975, London
- Genre: Country
- Label: ILC Media
- Producer: Terry Hughes

=== Glen Campbell and Friends ===
Glen Campbell and Friends contains all six episodes of the 1975 BBC television show "The Glen Campbell Music Show". Each episode featured one special guest star and ran for 30 to 45 minutes. The television series began their screening on Sunday, April 20, 1975, on BBC2.

Number	UK air date	Guest	Duration
1	April 20, 1975	Jimmy Webb	43 min.
2	April 27, 1975	Wayne Newton	43 min.
3	May 4, 1975	Helen Reddy	44 min.
4	May 11, 1975	David Gates	30 min.
5	May 18, 1975	Anne Murray	45 min.
6	May 25, 1975	Seals & Crofts	42 min.

The shows were taped for worldwide distribution. In 1976, five shows ran on Global TV in Canada and in 1980, they were made available as 50 minute specials for US cable television, under the title of "Glen Campbell and Friends". In 2007 all six episodes were released on DVD.

==== Track listing ====
Disk 1:

- With Special Guest Star David Gates
1. "Once In A Lifetime"
2. "Try A Little Kindness" (Curt Sapaugh/Bobby Austin)
3. "William Tell Overture" (Rossini)
4. "Everything I Own" (David Gates) - David Gates
5. "Oh Happy Day" (Edwin Hawkins)
6. "Fox Fire" (Carl Jackson)
7. "Part Time Love" (David Gates) - David Gates
8. "Medley:" - duet with David Gates
  1. "Make It With You" (David Gates)
  2. "Baby I'm A Want You" (David Gates)
  3. "Never Let Her Go" (David Gates)
9. "If" (David Gates)
- With Special Guest Star Anne Murray
1. "More/Somewhere" (R. Ortolani/N.Oliviero/Leonard Bernstein/Stephen Sondheim)
2. "The Most Beautiful Girl In The World" (Billy Sherrill/Norris Wilson/Rory Michael Bourke)
3. "Teddy Bear" (Kal Mann/Bernie Lowe)
4. "Annie's Song" (John Denver)
5. "Dream Lover" (Bobby Darin) - Anne Murray
6. "Highly Prized Possession" (A. Palmer) - Anne Murray
7. "Classical Gas" (Mason Williams)
8. "Time In A Bottle" (Jim Croce)
9. "Orange Blossom Special" (E. Rouse)
10. "You Won't See Me" (John Lennon/Paul McCartney) - Anne Murray
11. "Say A Little Prayer/By The Time I Get To Phoenix" (Burt Bacharach/Hal David/Jimmy Webb) - duet with Anne Murray
12. "Soliloquy From 'Carousel'" (Richard Rodgers/Oscar Hammerstein)

Disk 2:

- With Special Guest Stars Seals & Crofts
1. "Where Or When"
2. "Gentle On My Mind" (John Hartford)
3. "It's A Sin" (Jimmy Webb)
4. "I'll Play For You" (Seals/Crofts) - Seals & Crofts
5. "You Might As Well Smile" (Jimmy Webb)
6. "Moments To Remember"
7. "The Way We Were"/"Try To Remember" (Harvey Schmidt/Tom Jones/Marvin Hamlisch/Alan Bergman/Marilyn Bergman)
8. "Tequila" (Daniel Flores) - Glen Campbell, Seals & Crofts
9. "Summer Breeze" (Seals/Crofts) - Glen Campbell, Seals & Crofts
10. "Fiddle Hoe Down" - Glen Campbell, Seals & Crofts
11. "I Will Never Pass This Way Again" (Ronnie Gaylord)
12. "American Trilogy" (Mickey Newbury)
- With Special Guest Star Jimmy Webb
1. "Up And Away" (Jimmy Webb)
2. "Ocean In His Eyes" (Jimmy Webb)
3. "Streets Of London" (Ralph McTell)
4. "Foggy Mountain Breakdown" (with Carl Jackson) (Earl Scruggs)
5. "All I Know" (Jimmy Webb) - Jimmy Webb
6. "Medley":
  1. "By The Time I Get To Phoenix" (Jimmy Webb)
  2. "Wichita Lineman" (Jimmy Webb)
  3. "Galveston" (Jimmy Webb)
  4. "Didn't We" (Jimmy Webb)
7. "The Moon's A Harsh Mistress" (Jimmy Webb)
8. "Roll Me Easy" (Lowell George)
9. "Bonaparte's Retreat" (Pee Wee King)
10. "MacArthur Park" (Jimmy Webb)

Disk 3:

- With Special Guest Star Wayne Newton
1. "Dream Baby (How Long Must I Dream)" (Cindy Walker)
2. "I Honestly Love You" (Peter Allen/Jeff Barry)
3. "Fly Me to the Moon" (Bart Howard) - Wayne Newton
4. "It Only Takes a Moment" - Wayne Newton
5. "Bridge Over Troubled Water" (Paul Simon) - Wayne Newton
6. "Ain't No Sunshine" (Bill Withers)
7. "Dreams of the Everyday Housewife" (Chris Gantry)
8. "Take Me Home Country Roads" (John Denver)
9. "Duelling Banjos" (with Carl Jackson) (Arthur "Guitar Boogie" Smith/Don Reno)
10. "Country Boy" (Albert Lee)
11. "Medley: - duet with Wayne Newton
  1. "Little Green Apples" (Bobby Russell)
  2. "Honey" (Bobby Russell)
  3. "Honey Come Back" (Jimmy Webb)
  4. "Release Me" (Eddie Miller/Robert Yount/Dub Williams)
12. "He Ain't Heavy He's My Brother" (Bob Russell)
- With Special Guest Star Helen Reddy
1. "I Believe In Music" (Mac Davis)
2. "Galveston" (Jimmy Webb)
3. "Mary In The Morning" (Michael Lendell/Johnny Cymbal)
4. "The Entertainer" (Scott Joplin)
5. "Angie Baby" (Alan O'Day) - Helen Reddy
6. "You And Me Against The World" (Paul Williams) - Helen Reddy
7. "Give Me Back That Old Familiar Feeling" (Billy Graham)
8. "I'm Just A Pushover" (Billy Graham) - Billy Graham
9. "Y'all Come" (Arlie Duff)
10. "Back Home Again in Indiana" (Ballard MacDonald/James F. Hanley)
11. "I Am Woman" (Helen Reddy/Ray Burton) - Helen Reddy
12. "Delta Dawn" (Alex Harvey) - duet with Helen Reddy
13. "The Impossible Dream" (Mitch Leigh/Joe Darion)

==== Personnel ====
- Glen Campbell - vocals, acoustic guitar, electric guitar
- Bob Felts - drums
- Billy Graham - bass guitar, harmony vocals
- Carl Jackson - acoustic guitar, electric guitar, banjo, harmony vocals
- Dennis McCarthy - musical director, keyboards
- Vocal backings - The Maggie Stredder Singers

==== Production ====
- Produced by Terry Hughes
- Orchestra directed by Richard Holmes
- Production assistant - Marcus Plantin
- Special musical arrangements - Dennis McCarthy
- Make Up - Jackie Fitz-Maurice, Deanne Turner, Pauline Gyertson
- Sound - Len Shorey
- Lightning - Bill Millar
- Design - Lesley Bremness
- Distributed by ILC Media
- Issued under license from TKO Licensing Limited

Through the Years Live - Ultimate Collection

Video by Glen Campbell
- Released: 2011
- Recorded: 1972, 1975, London, 1990, Doncaster, 2001, Sioux Falls
- Genre: Country
- Label: Full Fill

=== Through the Years Live - Ultimate Collection ===
Through the Years Live - Ultimate Collection is a DVD/CD set released to coincide with the UK leg of the Glen Campbell Goodbye Tour. The CD contains the audiotrack of the previously released video Live at the Dome. The DVD consists of a selection of performances by Glen Campbell, band and orchestra taken from BBC television shows Glen Campbell From The Talk of the Town (1972) and The Glen Campbell Music Show (1975) and two concerts, previously released as Live at the Dome (1990) and Glen Campbell in Concert (2001). Five previously unreleased performances are included: "If You Go Away" (1972), "The Impossible Dream" (1972), "Try a Little Kindness/Honey Come Back/Gentle on My Mind" (1972), "Where's the Playground Suzie" (1975) and "Proud Mary" (1975).

==== Track listing ====
1. "By the Time I Get to Phoenix" (Jimmy Webb)
2. "If You Go Away" (Jacques Brel/Rod McKuen)
3. "Help Me Make It Through the Night" (Kris Kristofferson)
4. "Galveston" (Jimmy Webb)
5. "Wichita Lineman" (Jimmy Webb)
6. "The Impossible Dream" (Darion/Leigh)
7. "Gentle on My Mind" (John Hartford)
8. "Mary in the Morning" (Cymbal)
9. "Try a Little Kindness" (Austin/Sapaugh)
10. "Where's the Playground Suzie" (Jimmy Webb)
11. "Oh Happy Day" (Rimbault/Doddridge/arr. Hawkins)
12. "He Ain't Heavy, He's My Brother (Russell/Scott)
13. "Dreams of the Everyday Housewife" (Chris Gantry)
14. "Bonaparte's Retreat" (King/Stewart)
15. "MacArthur Park (Jimmy Webb)
16. "I Will Never Pass This Way Again" (Gaylord)
17. "Rhinestone Cowboy" (Larry Weiss)
18. "Southern Nights" (Allen Toussaint)
19. "True Grit" (Joel Bernstein/Don Black)
20. "Mull of Kintyre" (Paul McCartney)
21. "Highwayman" (Jimmy Webb)
22. "It's Only Make Believe" (Conway Twitty/Jack Nance)
23. "Amazing Grace" (John Newton)

==== Bonus features ====
===== Instrumentals =====
1. Duelling Banjos (Smith)
2. Ain't No Sunshine (Bill Withers)
3. Orange Blossom Special (Rouse)
4. Fox Fire (Size)
5. The Entertainer (Scott Joplin)
6. Foggy Mountain Breakdown (Earl Scruggs)
7. William Tell Overture (Rossini)
8. Classical Gas (Mason Williams)

===== Duets and medleys =====
1. Medley with David Gates:
  1. Make It with You (David Gates)
  2. Baby I'm-a Want You (David Gates)
  3. Never Let Her Go (David Gates)
2. Medley with Jimmy Webb:
  1. By the Time I Get to Phoenix (Jimmy Webb)
  2. Wichita Lineman (Jimmy Webb)
  3. Galveston (Jimmy Webb)
  4. Honey Come Back (Jimmy Webb)
3. Duet with Anne Murray: I Say a Little Prayer/By the Time I Get to Phoenix (Burt Bacharach/Hal David/Jimmy Webb)
4. Duet with Helen Reddy: Delta Dawn (Harvey/Collins)
5. Medley with Wayne Newton:
  1. Little Green Apples (Bobby Russell)
  2. Honey (Bobby Russell)
  3. Honey Come Back (Jimmy Webb)
  4. Please Release Me (Miller/Williams/Young)
6. Duet with Seals & Crofts: Summer Breeze (Jimmy Seals/Dash Crofts)
7. Medley:
  1. Try a Little Kindness (Austin/Sapaugh)
  2. Honey Come Back (Jimmy Webb)
  3. Gentle on My Mind (John Hartford)
8. Medley:
  1. Good Vibrations (Brian Wilson/Mike Love)
  2. California Girls (Brian Wilson/Mike Love)
  3. Fun Fun Fund (Mike Love/Brian Wilson)
  4. I Get Around (Mike Love/Brian Wilson)
  5. Surfin' USA (Chuck Berry/Brian Wilson)
9. Duet with Debby Campbell: Little Green Apples (Bobby Russell)

===== Bonus tracks =====
1. Didn't We (Jimmy Webb)
2. Streets of London (Ralph McTell)
3. An American Trilogy (trad. arr. by Mickey Newbury)
4. Time in a Bottle (Jim Croce)
5. Proud Mary (John Fogerty)
6. Annie's Song (John Denver)

==== Personnel ====
- Glen Campbell - vocals, acoustic guitar, electric guitar, bagpipes

==== Production ====
- Executive producers - Jeffrey Kruger and Howard Kruger

=== Glen Campbell and Jimmy Webb In Session ===
Glen Campbell American Treasure

Compilation album by Glen Campbell
- Released: December 2012
- Recorded: 1960–2010
- Label: Surfdog

=== Glen Campbell American Treasure ===
Glen Campbell American Treasure is a limited edition box set compilation with three CDs and one DVD released by Surfdog records. The set's DVD features select musical and comedic performances by Campbell and guests on The Glen Campbell Goodtime Hour, broadcast on CBS-TV between 1969 and 1972. This box set is limited to 1,000 copies.

==== Release ====
American Treasure was available for pre-order in February 2012, with an anticipated release date in late spring of the same year. However, production of the box set was subsequently delayed twice, first until late summer / early fall of 2012, due to third-party clearance issues with some of its licensed materials, and again until mid-December, when the box set was ultimately released for distribution.

==== Track listing ====
The Goodtime Hour Variety Show
No.	Title	Artist	Length
1.	"Wichita Lineman" (Original Air Date 1/29/69)	Glen Campbell
2.	"Last Train to Clarksville" / "I'm a Believer" / Salesman" (Original Air Date 2/5/69)	The Monkees
3.	"California Dreamin'" (Original Air Date 2/12/69)	Jose Feliciano
4.	"Blowin' in the Wind" (Original Air Date 2/19/69)	Stevie Wonder with Glen Campbell
5.	"Cryin' Time" (Original Air Date 4/9/69)	Ray Charles with Glen Campbell
6.	"Son of a Preacher Man" (Original Air Date 4/16/69)	Nancy Sinatra
7.	"Folsom Prison Blues" (Original Air Date 4/23/69)	Johnny Cash
8.	"Railroad Workers" (Original Air Date 4/23/69)	Bob Newhart with Glen Campbell
9.	"Bye, Bye Love" (Original Air Date 4/30/69)	The Righteous Brothers with Glen Campbell
10.	"Alimony / My Good Old Texas Home" (Original Air Date 4/30/69)	Glen Campbell and his parents (Wes & Carrie)
11.	"Street Bridge Song (Feeling Groovy)" (Original Air Date 5/7/69)	Goldie Hawn with Glen Campbell
12.	"Court Jester" (Original Air Date 9/24/69)	Steve Martin and The Smothers Brothers with Glen Campbell
13.	"Broken-Hearted Melody" (Original Air Date 9/24/69)	Sarah Vaughan with Glen Campbell
14.	"Bang Bang" (Original Air Date 10/15/69)	Cher with Glen Campbell
15.	"Get Together" (Original Air Date 10/22/69)	Dionne Warwick with Glen Campbell
16.	"Silver Threads & Golden Needles" (Original Air Date 10/29/69)	Linda Ronstadt with Glen Campbell
17.	"Hello Walls" (Original Air Date 11/12/69)	Willie Nelson with Glen Campbell
18.	"Hank Williams Medley: Cold Cold Heart / I’m So Lonesome I Could Cry / Your Cheatin’ Heart / I Can’t Help It (If I’m Still in Love with You) / Kaw-Liga / Hey Good Lookin / Jambalaya" (Original Air Date 12/3/69)	Tony Bennett with Glen Campbell
19.	"The Twelve Days of Christmas" (Original Air Date 12/21/69)	Andy Griffith with Glen Campbell
20.	"Together Again / I Can’t Stop Loving You / You Are My Sunshine / I Got a Woman" (Original Air Date 1/25/70)	Ray Charles with Glen Campbell
21.	"Sunday Mornin'" (Original Air Date 2/15/70)	Bobbie Gentry with Glen Campbell
22.	"Four Strong Winds" (Original Air Date 3/15/70)	Judy Collins with Glen Campbell
23.	"Buck Owens with Glen Campbell" (Original Air Date 9/27/70)	Buck Owens with Glen Campbell
24.	"Camptown Races" (Original Air Date 10/11/70)	Kenny Rogers & The First Edition with Glen Campbell
25.	"Homeward Bound / Keep the Customer Satisfied" (Original Air Date 10/18/70)	The Supremes with Glen Campbell
26.	"(Open Up The Door) Let The Good Times In / Lay Some Happiness on Me / Things / Walk the Line" (Original Air Date 11/15/70)	Dean Martin with Glen Campbell
27.	"Carol of the Bells" (Original Air Date 12/20/70)	Glen Campbell and family
28.	"Shake, Rattle & Roll / Tweedlee Dee / Blue Suede Shoes / Yakety Yak / Young Love / Get a Job / Little Darlin' / I’m Walkin'" (Original Air Date 1/24/71)	Sonny & Cher with Glen Campbell
29.	"Put Your Hand in the Hand of the Man" (Original Air Date 2/21/71)	The Osmond Brothers with Glen Campbell
30.	"Broken Props Sketch" (Original Air Date 9/14/71)	John Wayne and Tim Conway with Glen Campbell
31.	"Chat About Working Together in Film 'True Grit'" (Original Air Date 9/14/71)	John Wayne and Glen Campbell
32.	"For All We Know" (Original Air Date 9/28/71)	Lucille Ball with Glen Campbell
33.	"Bonus video: A Better Place" (2012)	Glen Campbell
34.	"Bonus video: Ghost on the Canvas" (2011)	Glen Campbell

== See also ==
- Glen Campbell discography
- Glen Campbell collaborative discography
