= The Glen Campbell Music Show =

US television program

- Opening shot of episode 22 of The Glen Campbell Music Show: Glen Campbell performing "Saturday Night"
- Genre: Music Television Series
- Written by: Rod Warren
- Directed by: Bob Henry
- Presented by: Glen Campbell
- Starring: Glen Campbell, Caledonia, guests
- Country of origin: United States
- No. of seasons: 1
- No. of episodes: 25 (including 1981 pilot)

Production
- Executive producer: Pierre Cossette
- Producer: Bob Henry
- Camera setup: Multi-Camera
- Running time: 30 minutes
- Production companies: Gaylord Entertainment Television, The Glen Campbell Company

Original release
- Release: September 18, 1982 – 1983

The Glen Campbell Music Show was a syndicated US music television series presented by singer/guitarist Glen Campbell. In 1981 a pilot episode was broadcast. The regular series which followed ran for one season, from September 1982 until 1983.

== Cast ==
- Glen Campbell (host) – vocals, acoustic and electric guitars, bagpipes
- Caledonia (band)
  - Kim Darigan – Bass guitar and bass fiddle
  - Craig Fall – Vocals, guitar, organ, keyboards
  - Steve Hardin – Vocals, organ, harmonica, synthesizer, piano
  - Carl Jackson – Vocals, guitar, banjo, fiddle, mandolin
  - T.J. Kuenster – Vocals, acoustic and electric pianos
  - Steve Turner – Vocals, drums, percussion

== Episodes ==
Number	U.S. air date	Guests	Songs
pilot	1981	Sheena Easton	"You Could Have Been with Me"; Sheena Easton "Rhinestone Cowboy" "Rollin' in My Sweet Baby's Arms" "I Love My Truck" "The Battle of New Orleans" "Mull of Kintyre"
1	18-Sep-82	The Smothers Brothers	"Don't Think Twice, It's All Right" comedy monologue The Smothers Brothers "John Henry" comedy monologue The Smothers Brothers "Blowin' in the Wind"; Glen Campbell & The Smothers Brothers "Arkansas" "The Last Thing on My Mind"
2	25-Sep-82	Mel Tillis	"Hey Good Lookin'" "Lovesick Blues" "Heart to Heart Talk"; Mel Tillis "I'm So Lonesome I Could Cry" "Detroit City"; Glen Campbell & Mel Tillis "Kaw-Liga" "I Saw the Light"; Glen Campbell & Mel Tillis
3	2-Oct-82	Terri Gibbs	"Ashes to Ashes"; Terri Gibbs "Somebody's Knockin'"; Glen Campbell & Terri Gibbs "Don't Pull Your Love/Then You Can Tell Me Goodbye" "Blues (My Naughty Sweetie Gives to Me)" "On the Wings of My Victory" "Galveston/Country Boy" (medley)
4	9-Oct-82	Chuck Mangione, Gerald & Shorty Campbell	"Highwayman" "Bonaparte's Retreat" "Steppin' Out" (instr.); Chuck Mangione "Wichita Lineman" "Land of Make Believe"; Glen Campbell & Chuck Mangione "I Can't Stand This Loneliness"; Glen, Gerald & Shorty Campbell "Old Hometown"
5	16-Oct-82	Leo Sayer	"Raining in My Heart"; Leo Sayer "When I Need You"; Glen Campbell & Leo Sayer "More Than I Can Say"; Glen Campbell & Leo Sayer "Farther Along"; Glen Campbell & Leo Sayer "Oh Boy" "Don't Loose Me in the Confusion" "I Love How You Love Me"
6	23-Oct-82	The Righteous Brothers	"Rollin'" "Tico-Tico" (instr.) "You've Lost That Lovin' Feeling/Soul and Inspiration" (medley); The Righteous Brothers "She's My Baby"; Glen Campbell & The Righteous Brothers "True Grit" "An American Trilogy"
7	30-Oct-82	Billy Preston	"Never Gonna Say Goodbye"; Billy Preston "Nothing from Nothing"; Glen Campbell & Billy Preston "When Can Brown Begin"; Glen Campbell & Billy Preston "Try a Little Kindness" "Texas (When I Die)" "Burning Bridges"
8	6-Nov-82	Roger Miller	"King of the Road"; Roger Miller "In the Summertime/Dang Me/England Swings" (medley); Glen Campbell & Roger Miller "Southern Nights" "Goin' Back to Alabam" "By the Time I Get to Phoenix" "It's Your World (Boys and Girls)"
9	13-Nov-82	Henry Mancini	"Baby Elephant Walk" (instr.); Glen Campbell & Henry Mancini "Days of Wine and Roses"; Glen Campbell & Henry Mancini "All His Children"; Glen Campbell & Henry Mancini "Moon River" "Salty Dog Blues" "Please Come to Boston"
10	20-Nov-82	Willie Nelson	"On the Road Again"; Glen Campbell & Willie Nelson "Always on My Mind"; Willie Nelson "Just to Satisfy You"; Glen Campbell & Willie Nelson "Mammas Don't Let Your Babies Grow Up to Be Cowboys"; Glen Campbell & Willie Nelson "Crazy" "Old Friends"; Glen Campbell, Willie Nelson, Roger Miller "Uncloudy Day"; Glen Campbell, Willie Nelson, Roger Miller
11	27-Nov-82	Rita Coolidge	"Words"; Rita Coolidge "Something 'Bout You Baby I Like"; Glen Campbell & Rita Coolidge "Show Me That You Love Me"; Glen Campbell & Rita Coolidge "Orange Blossom Special"; Caledonia "Ruth" "I Believe"
12	4-Dec-82	B.J. Thomas	"A Few Good Men" "New Looks from an Old Lover"; B.J. Thomas "I Remember You" "Raindrops Keep Fallin' on My Head"; Glen Campbell & B.J. Thomas "Hang On Baby (Ease My Mind)" "Amazing Grace"; Glen Campbell & B.J. Thomas
13	11-Dec-82	Johnny Mathis	"When It's Over"; Johnny Mathis "You Will Not Lose"; Glen Campbell & Johnny Mathis "(Sittin' on) The Dock of the Bay" "Wonderful, Wonderful" "Chances Are" "Chariots of Fire" (instr.)
14	18-Dec-82	Jerry Reed	"East Bound and Down"; Glen Campbell & Jerry Reed "After the Glitter Fades" "She Got the Goldmine (I Got the Shaft)"; Jerry Reed "Guitar Man"; Glen Campbell & Jerry Reed "Poison Love"; Glen Campbell & Jerry Reed "Amos Moses"; Glen Campbell & Jerry Reed "A Thing Called Love"; Glen Campbell, Jerry Reed, Carl Jackson "Mule Skinner Blues"; Glen Campbell & Jerry Reed
15	25-Dec-82	Emmylou Harris, Glen's parents	"Gone at Last" "Time in a Bottle" "My Song Bird"; Emmylou Harris "Detour" "On My Mind"; Glen Campbell, Emmylou Harris, Carl Jackson "Cheatin' Is"; Glen Campbell & Emmylou Harris "That Silver-haired Daddy of Mine"; Glen Campbell & Glen's Parents
16	1-Jan-83	Lacy J. Dalton, Gerald & Shorty Campbell	"16th Avenue"; Lacy J. Dalton "Let It Be"; Glen Campbell & Lacy J. Dalton "I Want to Be Wanted"; Glen, Gerald & Shorty Campbell "Blackbird"; Glen Campbell & Carl Jackson "Eight Days a Week" "With a Little Help from My Friends" "Yesterday"
17	8-Jan-83	Ray Stevens, Taffy McElroy	"Proud Mary" "My Window Faces the South" "Leo Lady"; Ray Stevens "Misty"; Glen Campbell & Ray Stevens "You Can Always Count on Me"; Taffy McElroy "Everything Is Beautiful"; Glen Campbell & Ray Stevens
18	15-Jan-83	Andrae Crouch	"Question" "Morning Has Broken" "Finally"; Andrae Crouch "Fire on the Sea"; Glen Campbell & T.J. Kuenster "Peace Train"; Glen Campbell & Andrae Crouch "The Last Free Man"
19	22-Jan-83	Tammy Wynette	"Stand by Your Man"; Glen Campbell & Tammy Wynette "My Song" "Another Chance"; Tammy Wynette "You and Me" "My Elusive Dreams"Glen Campbell & Tammy Wynette "I Knew Jesus (Before He Was a Star)"
20	29-Jan-83	The Statler Brothers	"Sunflower" "Sweet Baby James" "Child of the Fifties"; The Statler Brothers "Milk Cow Blues" "Flowers on the Wall"; Glen Campbell & The Statler Brothers "Faithless Love"
21	5-Feb-83	Air Supply	"Reachin' for the Sky" "Young Love"; Air Supply "Bloodline" "Even the Nights Are Better"; Glen Campbell & Air Supply "Somebody's Trying to Tell You Something"
22	12-Feb-83	Jimmy Webb	"Saturday Night"; Glen Campbell & Jimmy Webb "Ocean in His Eyes" "Easy for You to Say"; Jimmy Webb "MacArthur Park"; Glen Campbell & Jimmy Webb "Till God Comes Back Again (Old Wing Mouth)"; Glen Campbell & Jimmy Webb
23	19-Feb-83	Andy Williams	"This Land is Your Land"; Glen Campbell & Andy Williams "Down in the Valley" "Regrets"; Andy Williams "Hollywood" "Canadian Sunset"; Glen Campbell & Andy Williams "My Country"
24	26-Feb-83	Ronnie Milsap, Sandi Brink	"Mountain Music" "Nine Pound Hammer" "Inside"; Ronnie Milsap "The Sweetest Thing (I've Ever Known)"; Glen Campbell & Sandi Brink "(There's) No Gettin' Over Me"; Glen Campbell & Ronnie Milsap "In the Pines"; Glen Campbell, Carl Jackson, Steve Hardin, Kim Darigan

== Production ==
- Executive producer – Pierre Cossette
- Producer/director – Bob Henry
- Associate Producer – Roger Adams
- Associate Director – Paula Burr
- Producer Assistant – Gail Purse
- Musical director – T.J. Kuenster
- Writer – Rod Warren
- Costume Supervisor – Bill Belew
- Talent Coordinator – Tisha Fein
- Production Designer – Rene Lagler
- Production Coordinator – Ron Andreassen
- Production Assistant – Syngehilde Schweikart
- Production Associates – Keith Henry, Joel Valentincic
- Unit Manager – Tim Stevens
- Technical Director – Karl Messerschmidt
- Lighting – Olin Younger
- Audio – Joe Ralston
- Video Tape Editors – Andy Zall, Kevin Fernan
- Stage Managers – Steve Burgess, Vince Poxon
- Production Executive – Dee Brantlinger
- A production of Gaylord Entertainment Television and The Glen Campbell Company

== The Glen Campbell Video Collection ==
Two episodes of The Glen Campbell Music Show were released on video in 1990.

Title	Episode	Year of release
The Glen Campbell Music Show with Special Guest Star: Roger Miller	8	1990
The Glen Campbell Music Show with Special Guest Star: Willie Nelson	10	1990

== See also ==
- The Glen Campbell Goodtime Hour
