= See You There =

Studio album by Glen Campbell
- Released: 13 August 2013
- Recorded: 2009–2013
- Genre: Country, pop, rock
- Length: 38:00
- Label: Surfdog
- Producer: Dave Kaplan; Dave Darling; Julian Raymond; Howard Willing

Glen Campbell chronology
Glen Campbell and Jimmy Webb: In Session (2012)	See You There (2013)	I'll Be Me - Soundtrack (2015)

Professional ratings
Aggregate scores
Source	Rating
Metacritic	74/100
Review scores
Source	Rating
Consequence of Sound	3.5/5 stars
Los Angeles Times	3.5/5 stars
Allmusic	2.5/5 stars

See You There is the sixty-third studio album by Glen Campbell, and the last to be released in his lifetime. It was recorded around the same time as Ghost on the Canvas and was put on hold when Campbell undertook his Goodbye Tour from 2011 to 2012. The album was released on August 13, 2013, on vinyl, CD and digital.

== Track listing ==
No.	Title	Writer(s)	Length
1.	"Hey Little One"	Dorsey Burnette, Barry De Vorzon	2:37
2.	"Wichita Lineman"	Jimmy Webb	3:36
3.	"Gentle on My Mind"	John Hartford	3:02
4.	"Postcard from Paris"	Webb	3:36
5.	"Waiting on the Comin' of My Lord"	Glen Campbell, Julian Raymond	3:06
6.	"What I Wouldn't Give"	Campbell, Raymond	2:44
7.	"Galveston"	Webb	3:11
8.	"By the Time I Get to Phoenix"	Webb	3:07
9.	"There's No Me... Without You"	Campbell, Raymond	3:24
10.	"True Grit"	Elmer Bernstein, Don Black	2:39
11.	"Rhinestone Cowboy"	Larry Weiss	3:49
12.	"Waiting on the Comin' of My Lord" (featuring José Hernàndez & Mariachi Sol de Mexico)	Campbell, Raymond	3:10

== Chart performance ==
Chart (2013)	Peak position
US Billboard 200	89
US Top Country Albums (Billboard)	22
US Independent Albums (Billboard)	16
UK Albums (OCC)	35
