= Meet Glen Campbell =

Studio album by Glen Campbell
- Released: 19 August 2008
- Recorded: March – April 2008 at the Record Company Studios, Sunset Sound and Henson Studios, Hollywood, CA
- Genre: Country
- Label: Capitol
- Producers: Julian Raymond, Howard Willing

Glen Campbell chronology
Love Is the Answer: 24 Songs of Faith, Hope and Love (2004)	Meet Glen Campbell (2008)	Ghost on the Canvas (2011)

Meet Glen Campbell is the sixtieth album by American singer/guitarist Glen Campbell, released in 2008. The album consisted of country covers of rock songs by Travis, Tom Petty, The Replacements, Jackson Browne, U2, The Velvet Underground, John Lennon, Green Day, and Foo Fighters. In 2012, Capitol Records reissued it with five bonus tracks, including live versions from the 2008 AOL Sessions of "Wichita Lineman", "Rhinestone Cowboy", and "All I Want Is You"), and new 2008 remixes of the tracks "Gentle on My Mind" and "Galveston".

Professional ratings
Review scores
Source	Rating
Allmusic	link
Billboard	link
PopMatters	link
Blender Magazine	link
Entertainment Weekly	(B+) link
Houston Chronicle	link
Knoxville Voice	link
Miami Herald	link
Monsters and Critics.com	link
New York Daily News	link
Sacramento Bee	link
Santa Barbara Independent	link
Engine 145	link
Uncut	link

== Track listing ==
=== Side one ===
1. "Sing" (Francis Healy) – 3:45
2. "Walls" (Tom Petty) – 3:31
3. "Angel Dream" (Petty) – 2:29
4. "Times Like These" (Dave Grohl, Taylor Hawkins, Nate Mendel, Chris Shiflett) – 3:28
5. "These Days" (Jackson Browne) – 3:29

=== Side two ===
6. "Sadly Beautiful" (Paul Westerberg) – 3:20
7. "All I Want Is You" (Adam Clayton, David Evans, Paul Hewson, Larry Mullen, Jr.) – 4:15
8. "Jesus" (Lou Reed) – 3:10
9. "Good Riddance (Time of Your Life)" (Billie Joe Armstrong, Frank Wright, Mike Dirnt) – 2:35
10. "Grow Old with Me" (John Lennon) – 3:40

The limited edition vinyl edition, released August 5, includes a 2008 remix of "Galveston" (Jimmy Webb) as a bonus track. The Wal-Mart-only CD included 2008 remixes for "Gentle on My Mind", "By the Time I Get to Phoenix", "Wichita Lineman", "Galveston", and "Rhinestone Cowboy". In January 2012, Capitol reissued the album. Bonus tracks were the remixes of "Gentle on My Mind" and "Galveston" and three songs from a 2008 AOL Sessions concert: "Wichita Lineman", "Rhinestone Cowboy" and "All I Want Is You".

== Personnel ==
- Glen Campbell – vocals, electric guitar
- Jason Falkner – electric guitar
- Wendy Melvoin – electric guitar
- George Doering – acoustic guitar, banjo, mandolin
- Chris Chaney – bass guitar
- Roger Joseph Manning Jr. – keyboards
- Vinnie Colaiuta – drums
- Luis Conte – percussion
- Marty Rifkin – pedal steel
- Rick Nielsen – guitar
- Todd Youth – guitar
- Kim Bullard – keyboards
- Backing vocals – Robin Zander, Debby Campbell, Cal Campbell, Dillon Campbell, Ashley Campbell, Shannon Campbell

== Production ==
- Produced by Julian Raymond, Howard Willing
- Mixed by Howard Willing, Julian Raymond
- Recorded by Howard Willing
- All songs arranged by Julian Raymond
- Strings and horns arranged and conducted by Bennett Salvay
- Mastered by Brian Gardner at Bernie Grundman Mastering
- Mastered for vinyl by Ron McMaster at Capitol Mastering
- A&R executive – Rick Camino
- Art direction – Tom Recchion
- Art and design – Chris Kro
- Photography – Steve Silvas, Dax Kimbrough

== Charts ==
Chart (2008)	Peak position
US Billboard 200	155
US Billboard Country Albums	27
New Zealand Albums Chart	26
UK Albums Chart	54

Meet Glen Campbell debuted at No. 155 on the Billboard 200 chart dated September 6, 2008. Its debut UK chart position was No. 54. By August 2011, the album had sold 24,000 copies, according to Nielsen Soundscan.
