= Steve Hardin =

American songwriter

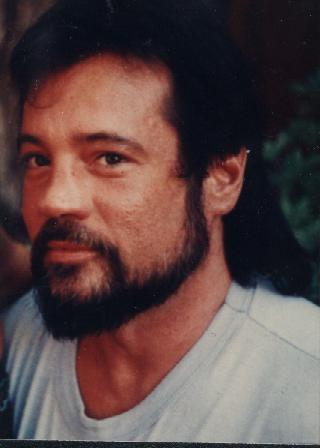

Background information
- Birth name: Stephen Joseph Hardin
- Born: October 27, 1946; Santa Monica, California, U.S.
- Died: June 28, 2015 (aged 68); Tulsa, Oklahoma, U.S.
- Genres: Country, Rock, Blues, Reggae
- Instrument(s): Keyboards, Harmonica, Clavinet
- Formerly of: Point Blank, Steppenwolf, Glen Campbell

Stephen Joseph Hardin (October 27, 1946 – June 28, 2015) was an American songwriter, keyboardist, and harmonica and clavinet player. He was probably best known as the writer of top-ten country hits "I Love My Truck" (#10, Glen Campbell) and "Breakin' Down" (#10, Waylon Jennings), although his diverse career included performing tours with Point Blank, Glen Campbell and Steppenwolf; a seven-year gig in a south Florida Reggae band; and a solo CD with backup vocals by Gretchen Wilson.

== History ==
Hardin played in bands in Dallas, Oklahoma City and Tulsa in the late 1960s and early 1970s before joining Point Blank as a keyboard man in 1977. The band's next album release, Airplay, including his composition "Mean to Your Queenie", which would become the band's trademark concert theme song.

Hardin met John Kay when Steppenwolf was opening for Point Blank in a venue in west Texas, and Kay offered Hardin a keyboard job with Steppenwolf. Hardin accepted, and spent the rest of the year touring with the band.

While back in L.A. with Steppenwolf, Hardin learned that Glen Campbell was wanting to hire a full-time writer for his records, tours, and T.V. performances. He interviewed, got the job, and spent the next five years working with Campbell writing songs (using the name Joe Rainey), touring, and performing on The Glen Campbell Music Show.

After working with Campbell, Hardin started hanging out at Nashville's Hall of Fame Club, and he met and married Tulsa country music singer Gus Hardin. He stayed with Gus and her band for about a year before striking out for south Florida, where he spent the next seven years playing Reggae. From there he moved on to Nashville's Bourbon Street Blues and Boogie Bar, where he was the keyboardist for Stacy Mitchhart and Blues-U-Can-Use.

Hardin died on June 28, 2015.

== Albums/CDs ==
- Point Blank - "Airplay"
- 2 albums w/Tanya Tucker
- 3 albums w/Glen Campbell
- "Cheryl Dilcher" album w/ Lowell George
- "Rhythmgypsy" solo album

== Original songs ==
| Year | Song | Artist/Group | Chart Positions | | | Album |
| Year | Song | Artist/Group | US Country | US | CAN Country | Album |
|---|---|---|---|---|---|---|
| 1979 | "Mean To Your Queenie" | Point Blank | — | — | — | Airplay |
| 1979 | "Shine On" | Point Blank | — | — | — | Airplay |
| 1979 | "Danger Zone" | Point Blank | — | — | — | Airplay |
| 1980 | "Somebody Trying to Tell You Something" | Tanya Tucker | — | — | — | Dreamlovers |
| 1980 | "My Song" | Tanya Tucker | — | — | — | Dreamlovers |
| 1981 | "Rollin'" (Joe Rainey, Jack Tempchin) | Glen Campbell | — | — | — | It's the World Gone Crazy |
| 1981 | "It's Your World" | Glen Campbell | — | — | — | It's the World Gone Crazy |
| 1981 | "I Love My Truck" | Glen Campbell | 10 | 94 | 39 | The Night the Lights Went Out in Georgia soundtrack |
| 1981 | "Heartache #3" | Tanya Tucker | — | — | — | Should I Do It |
| 1981 | "Rodeo Girls" (Joe Rainey, Tanya Tucker) | Tanya Tucker | 83 | — | — | Should I Do It |
| 1982 | "Hang On Baby (Ease My Mind)" (Joe Rainey, Dan Rogers) | Glen Campbell | — | — | — | Old Home Town |
| 1982 | "A Few Good Men" | Glen Campbell | — | — | — | Old Home Town |
| 1983 | "Breakin' Down" | Waylon Jennings | 10 | — | 4 | It's Only Rock + Roll |
| 1987 | "Arkansas" | Glen Campbell | — | — | — | Still Within the Sound of My Voice |
| 1991 | "A Few Good Men" | Glen Campbell | — | — | — | Show Me Your Way |
