= Glen Campbell and Jimmy Webb: In Session =

Live album by Glen Campbell and Jimmy Webb
- Released: 25 September 2012
- Recorded: December 1988
- Genre: Country
- Length: 35:36
- Label: Fantasy
- Producer: Ian Anderson

Glen Campbell chronology
Ghost on the Canvas (2011)	Glen Campbell and Jimmy Webb: In Session (2012)	See You There (2013)

Glen Campbell and Jimmy Webb: In Session is the sixty-second album by American singer-guitarist Glen Campbell—a collaborative album with Jimmy Webb—released in September 2012 by Fantasy Records. The album and its accompanying DVD were filmed, taped, and recorded live on December 9, 1988, in the Hamilton, Ontario studios of CHCH-TV as part of the Canadian concert series In Session.

== Background ==
Arkansas-born Glen Campbell began his music career as a session guitarist and singer who played and sang on numerous surf, hot rod, and sunshine pop records in the mid-1960s. After filling in for Brian Wilson as a touring member of the Beach Boys in 1965, Capitol Records (the Beach Boys' label) offered Campbell a solo recording contract. Two years later, Campbell's version of John Hartford's "Gentle on My Mind" became a big hit on the pop charts. During that time, Oklahoma-born songwriter Jimmy Webb was starting to place his elegantly crafted songs with recording artists. Webb's beautiful "By the Time I Get to Phoenix" was originally recorded by Tony Martin for Motown Records, but it was never released. Campbell first heard the recording through Johnny Rivers and soon recorded his own version, which topped the charts at the end of 1967. He commissioned another song from Webb, who soon provided "Wichita Lineman", a "gorgeous, haunting piece of contemporary Americana full of longing, distance, loneliness, and resigned exhaustion." In 1969, a third addition to the so-called "town songs" cycle, "Galveston", was equally compelling and impressive. A unique and fluid collaboration and friendship between the two followed, which helped both men get their careers off the ground. Campbell would go on to record numerous other Jimmy Webb songs and produce several collaborative albums with Webb, including Reunion: The Songs of Jimmy Webb (1974), Live at the Royal Festival Hall (1977), and Light Years (1988).

== Production ==
Glen Campbell and Jimmy Webb: In Session was filmed, taped, and recorded in December 1988 in the Hamilton, Ontario studios of CHCH-TV as part of the Canadian concert series In Session. The two-disc package contains an audio CD and a DVD, both of which offer a rare look at Glen Campbell and Jimmy Webb performing together, Campbell on guitar and singing, and Webb accompanying him on piano. The DVD contains filmed interviews with Campbell and Webb.

== Critical reception ==
Professional ratings
Review scores
Source	Rating
Allmusic	3.5/5 stars
American Songwriter	2.5/5 stars

In his review for Allmusic, Steve Leggett gave the album three and a half out of five stars, noting that "as an archival-type release that shines light on what Webb and Campbell created, particularly with the "town songs" cycle, this set is well worth a listen." Leggett continued:

The sound is sparse and perfectly fitted to letting the songs themselves shine out, and while the versions here of songs like "Wichita Lineman" and "Galveston" (which is done slower than the original single—the slowed-down tempo somehow fills the song with even more yearning) are elegant and reverent, they certainly don't replace the original single versions, but they do augment them.

In his review for American Songwriter, Hal Horowitz gave the album only two and a half out of five stars, complaining that some of the duo's major hits are not presented in their entirety, and that others are intercut with interview segments. Horowitz continued:

Campbell is in terrific voice, the nameless and predominantly faceless band provides strong support, and the program mixes rearranged classics such as "Galveston" and "Wichita Lineman" with rarities like the only known Campbell performance of a Webb tune named "Sunshower". Webb's short interviews are informative and casual on the DVD, but adding them to the CD disrupts the flow.

Horowitz concluded that Glen Campbell and Jimmy Webb: In Session is "well worth buying for fans, but with more care taken to find additional footage and re-edit the existing tapes using current technology ..., the package could have been much better."

== Track listing ==
All songs were written by Jimmy Webb.

Disc 1 (CD)

1. "Light Years" – 4:19
2. "If These Walls Could Speak" – 3:05
3. "Galveston" – 3:49
4. "Where's the Playground Susie" – 2:25
5. "MacArthur Park" – 7:24
6. "Wichita Lineman" – 3:47
7. "The Moon Is a Harsh Mistress" – 3:59
8. "Sunshower" – 2:49
9. "Still Within the Sound of My Voice" – 3:59

Disc 2 (DVD)
ACT I

1. Excerpt from "By the Time I Get to Phoenix" – 1:28
2. Jimmy Webb on meeting Glen for the first time – 1:00
3. "Light Years" – 3:28
4. Glen and Jimmy discuss "If These Walls Could Speak" – 1:12
5. "If These Walls Could Speak" – 3:00
6. Glen and Jimmy discuss "Galveston" – 1:25
7. "Galveston" – 3:02
8. Glen and Jimmy discuss "Where's the Playground Susie" – 0:37
9. "Where's the Playground Susie" – 2:18
10. "MacArthur Park" – 7:30

ACT II

1. Excerpt from "Almost Alright Again" – 1:14
2. Jimmy Webb on "Wichita Lineman" – 1:00
3. "Wichita Lineman" – 3:07
4. Jimmy Webb on "The Moon Is a Harsh Mistress" – 0:53
5. "The Moon Is a Harsh Mistress" – 3:00
6. Jimmy Webb on "By the Time I Get to Phoenix" – 3:25
7. Glen and Jimmy discuss on "Honey Come Back" and "Sunshower" – 1:00
8. "Sunshower" – 2:44
9. "Still Within the Sound of My Voice" – 3:54

== Personnel ==
Music

- Glen Campbell – vocals, guitar
- Jimmy Webb – piano

Production

- Ian Anderson – original recording producer
- Doug McClement - recording engineer
- Abbey Anna – project assistant
- Rikka Arnold – editorial
- Bill Belmont – project assistant
- Chris Clough – release production
- Lee Hildebrand – liner notes
- Jimmy Hole – art direction
- Pollyanna Kwok – project assistant
- Marc Morgenstern – executive producer
- Patricia Phillips – project assistant
- Nick Phillips – executive producer
- Joe Tarantino – mastering
- Tim Ziegler – project assistant
