= It's Just a Matter of Time (album) =

Studio album by Glen Campbell
- Released: October 1985
- Recorded: 1985
- Studio: Music Mill, Nashville, TN
- Genre: Country
- Label: Atlantic
- Producer: Harold Shedd

Glen Campbell chronology
| No More Night (1985) | It's Just a Matter of Time (1985) | Still Within the Sound of My Voice (1987) |

It's Just a Matter of Time is the forty-second studio album by American singer/guitarist Glen Campbell, released in 1985 (see 1985 in music).

== Track listing ==
Side 1:

1. "It's Just a Matter of Time" (Clyde Otis, Brook Benton, Belford Hendricks) – 2:27
2. "Wild Winds" (Dave Hanner) – 3:25
3. "Cowboy Hall of Fame" (Jimmy Webb) – 2:33
4. "Rag Doll" (Steve Eaton) – 4:00
5. "Call Home" (Mike Reid, Troy Seals) – 3:26

Side 2:

1. "Do What You Gotta Do" (Webb) – 3:44
2. "Cowpoke" (Stan Jones) – 2:45
3. "Shattered" (Webb) – 3:30
4. "Sweet Sixteen" (Arranged by Glen Campbell) – 3:45
5. "Gene Autry, My Hero" (Marty Robbins) – 3:12

== Personnel ==
- Glen Campbell – vocals, acoustic guitars and electric guitars
- David Briggs – keyboards
- Shane Keister – synthesizer
- Eddie Bayers – drums
- Steve Turner – drums
- Larry Paxton – bass guitar
- Buddy Emmons – steel guitar
- Kenneth Bell – acoustic guitar
- Gregg Galbraith – acoustic guitar
- Brent Rowan – electric guitar
- The "A" Strings, Nashville String Machine – strings

Production

- Harold Shedd – production
- Jim Cotton – engineering
- Joe Scaife – engineering
- Aaron Rapoport – photography
- Bergen White – string arrangements ("It's Just a Matter of Time", "Wild Winds", "Call Home" and "Cowpoke")
- Jimmy Webb – string arrangements ("Cowboy Hall of Fame", "Rag Doll", "Do What You Gotta Do", "Shattered" and "Sweet Sixteen")
- Al De Lory – conducting ("Cowboy Hall of Fame")

== Chart performance ==
=== Album ===
| Chart (1985) | Peak position |
|---|---|
| U.S. Billboard Top Country Albums | 32 |

=== Singles ===
| Year | Single | Peak positions | |
| Year | Single | US Country | CAN Country |
|---|---|---|---|
| 1985 | "It's Just a Matter of Time" | 7 | 7 |
| 1986 | "Cowpoke" | 38 | — |
| 1986 | "Call Home" | 52 | — |
