= No More Night =

Studio album by Glen Campbell
- Released: August 14, 1985
- Recorded: 1985
- Studio: Woodland (Nashville, Tennessee); Knob Hill (Nashville, Tennessee); Music Mill (Nashville, Tennessee); Creative Workshop (Nashville, Tennessee)
- Genre: Contemporary Christian
- Label: Word
- Producer: Glen Campbell, Ken Harding

Glen Campbell chronology
Letter to Home (1984)	No More Night (1985)	It's Just a Matter of Time (1985)

No More Night is the forty-first album by American singer/guitarist Glen Campbell, released in 1985 (see 1985 in music).

== Track listing ==
Side 1:

1. "No More Night" (Walt Harrah) – 4:01
2. "Good Side of Tomorrow" (Dave Loggins) – 2:25
3. "When All Of God's Singers Get Home" (Arranged by Glen Campbell) – 3:12
4. "Jesus Is His Name" (T.J. Kuenster) – 2:16
5. "Trust in God and Do the Right" (Arranged by Glen Campbell) – 2:45

Side 2:

1. "Suffer Little Children" (Micheal Smotherman) – 4:15 (duet with Johnny Cash)
2. "Who Will Sing One More Song" (Arranged by Glen Campbell) – 2:12
3. "Before There Could Be Me" (Jimmy Webb) – 2:17
4. "Overflow" (Wayne Berry) – 3:01
5. "You Ask Me How I Know" (Arranged by Glen Campbell) – 3:07

== Personnel ==
- Glen Campbell – vocals
- T.J. Kuenster – piano
- Craig Fall – acoustic guitars and electric guitars
- Brent Rowan – electric guitar
- Kim Darigan – bass guitar
- Mike Brignardello – bass guitar
- Steve Turner – drums
- Shane Keister – synthesizer
- Dave Huntsinger – synthesizer
- The "A" Strings – strings
- Woodmont Baptist Choir, Bergen White, Diane Tidwell, Lisa Silver – background vocals

Production

- Glen Campbell – producer
- Ken Harding – producer
- T.J. Kuenster – track arrangements
- Bergen White – string arrangements
- Jim Cotton – engineer
- Rick McCollister – engineer
- Joe Scaife – engineer
- Lee Peterzell – engineer
- Joe Funderburk – engineer
- Greg Parker – engineer
- Paul Goldberg – engineer
- Mark Tucker – photography

== Accolades ==
GMA Dove Awards

Year	Winner	Category
1986	No More Night	Album by a Secular Artist
