= The Glen Campbell Goodtime Hour =

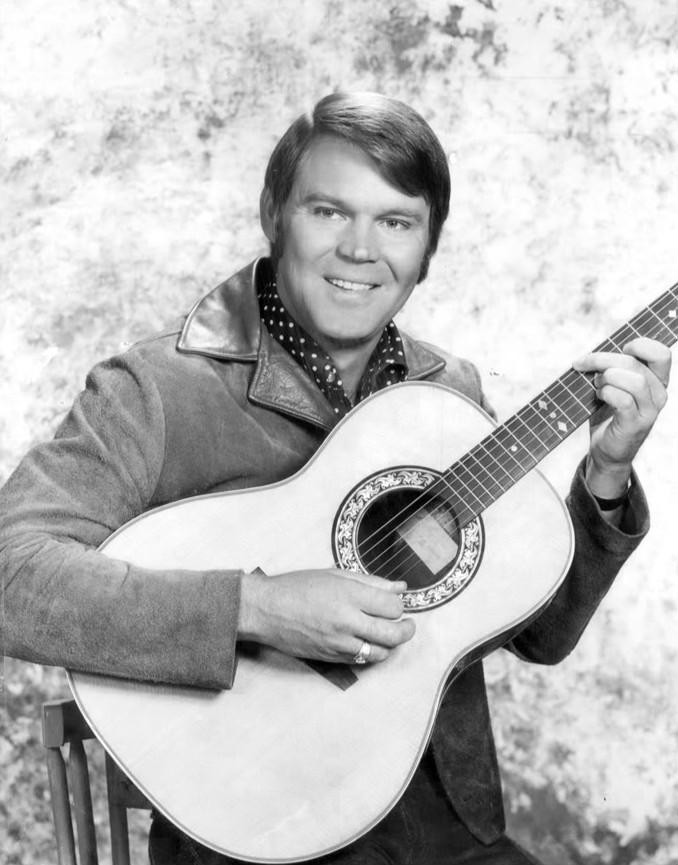
- Campbell as the show's host, 1969
- Genre: Variety show
- Written by: Sandy Krinski; Rob Reiner; Steve Martin
- Directed by: Jack Shea
- Presented by: Glen Campbell
- Opening theme: "Gentle on My Mind"
- Country of origin: United States
- Original language: English
- No. of seasons: 4
- No. of episodes: 91

Production
- Production locations: Los Angeles, California
- Running time: 60 minutes
- Production company: Glenco Enterprises

Original release
- Network: CBS
- Release: January 29, 1969 – June 13, 1972

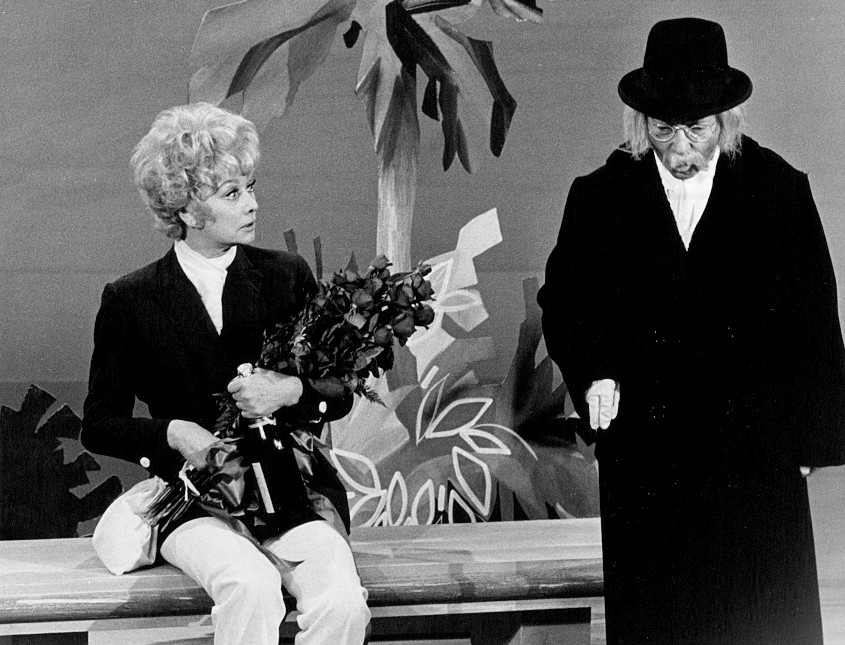
Arte Johnson as "Tyrone F. Horneigh" approaching Lucille Ball in a sketch on the show (1971). The character was originally created for Laugh-In.

The Glen Campbell Goodtime Hour is an American music and comedy television variety show that was hosted by singer Glen Campbell from January 29, 1969, to June 13, 1972, on CBS. He was offered the show after he hosted a 1968 summer replacement for The Smothers Brothers Comedy Hour. Campbell used "Gentle on My Mind" as the theme song of the show.

The show was one of the few shows with rural audience appeal to survive CBS's so-called "rural purge" of 1971, a survival made more unusual because it had fallen out of the top 30 shows that season. Episodes of the show are available in the libraries of free over-the-top (streaming) services Pluto TV and Shout! Factory TV.

== Nielsen Ratings ==
NOTE: The highest average rating for the series is in bold text.

Season	Rank	Rating
1968-1969	#15	**22.5**
1969-1970	#20	21.0 (tied with Hee Haw)
1970-1971	Not in the Top 30	
1971-1972	#37	18.7 (tied with The Odd Couple)

== Home media ==
One full episode and several highlights of other episodes of The Glen Campbell Goodtime Hour have been released on two videos and one DVD.

Title	Episode	Year of release
The Glen Campbell Goodtime Hour with Special Guest Stars: John Wayne, Tim Conway, Carol Burnett, Three Dog Night	68 (1 of season 4)	1990
Christmas with Glen Campbell	–	1996
Good Times Again	–	2007

== See also ==
- The Glen Campbell Music Show
