= Still Within the Sound of My Voice =

Studio album by Glen Campbell
- Released: August 1987
- Recorded: 1987
- Studio: Soundstage Studios, Nashville, TN
- Genre: Country
- Label: MCA
- Producer: Jimmy Bowen, Glen Campbell

Glen Campbell chronology
It's Just a Matter of Time (1985)	Still Within the Sound of My Voice (1987)	Light Years (1988)

Professional ratings
Review scores
Source	Rating
Allmusic	3/5 stars
New Musical Express	8/10

Still Within the Sound of My Voice is the forty-third album by American singer/guitarist Glen Campbell, released in 1987 (see 1987 in music). This was his debut album with MCA Records.

== Track listing ==
Side one

1. "I'm a One-Woman Man" (Tillman Franks, Johnny Horton) – 2:31
2. "Still Within the Sound of My Voice" (Jimmy Webb) – 4:08
3. "The Hand That Rocks the Cradle" (Ted Harris) – 3:05 (duet with Steve Wariner)
4. "For Sure, for Certain, Forever, for Always" (Webb) – 3:16
5. "I Have You" (Gene Nelson, Paul Nelson) – 3:18

Side two

1. "You Are" (Becky Hobbs, Don London) – 2:33 (duet with Emmylou Harris)
2. "Arkansas" (Joe Rainey) – 2:43
3. "In My Life" (Michael Cody, Mark H. Chesshir) – 4:02
4. "Leavin's Not the Only Way to Go" (Roger Miller) – 3:43
5. "I Remember You" (Johnny Mercer, Victor Schertzinger) – 2:48

== Personnel ==
- Glen Campbell – lead vocals, background vocals, acoustic guitar, electric guitar
- Matt Betton – drums
- David Hungate – bass guitar
- Billy Joe Walker Jr. – acoustic guitar, electric guitar
- Mark O'Connor – acoustic guitar, fiddle, viola, mandolin
- Larry Byrom – acoustic guitar, electric guitar
- Mike Lawler – synthesizer
- John Barlow Jarvis – piano, DX-7
- T.J. Kuenster – piano
- Craig Fall – acoustic guitar
- Curtis "Mr. Harmony" Young – background vocals
- Lee Greenwood – background vocals
- Willie Nelson – background vocals

Production

- Jimmy Bowen – producer
- Glen Campbell – producer
- Chuck Ainlay – mixing
- Peter Nash – photography
- Bill Brunt Designs – design
- Simon Levy – art direction
- Bob Bullock – recording engineer
- Willie Pevear – recording engineer
- Marty Williams – engineer
- Russ Martin – engineer
- Mark J. Coddington – engineer
- Tim Kish – engineer
- Milan Bogdan – digital editing

== Chart performance ==
=== Album ===
Chart (1987)	Peak position
U.S. Billboard Top Country Albums	32

=== Singles ===
Year	Single	Peak positions	
Year	Single	US Country	CAN Country
1987	"The Hand That Rocks the Cradle" (with Steve Wariner)	6	6
1987	"Still Within the Sound of My Voice"	5	47
1988	"I Remember You"	32	56
1988	"I Have You"	7	44
