= Glen Campbell =

American musician, actor and entertainer (1936–2017)

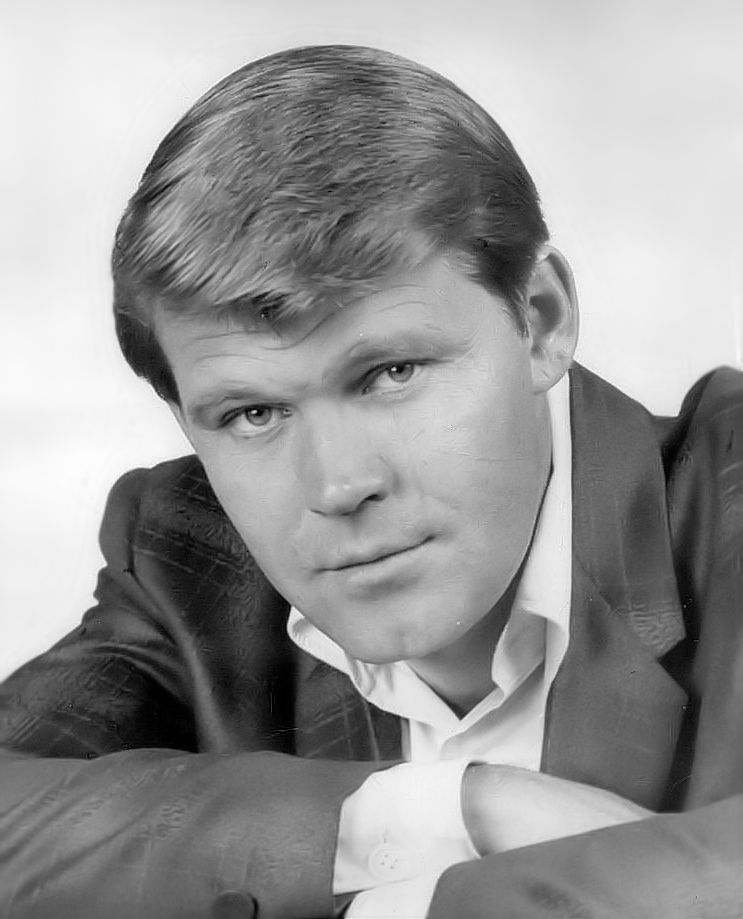
- Campbell in 1966
- Born: Glen Travis Campbell; April 22, 1936; Billstown, Arkansas, U.S.
- Died: August 8, 2017 (aged 81); Nashville, Tennessee, U.S.
- Occupations: Singer; musician; songwriter; actor; television host
- Years active: 1950–2013
- Spouses: Diane Marie Kirk (m. 1955; div. 1959); Billie Jean Nunley (m. 1959; div. 1976); Sarah Barg Davis (m. 1976; div. 1980); Kimberly Woollen (m. 1982)
- Children: 9, including Ashley
- Musical career
- Genres: Country; western; folk; pop; gospel; rock
- Instruments: Vocals; guitar; banjo; bagpipes; bass guitar
- Works: Glen Campbell discography
- Labels: Capitol/EMI; Atlantic; MCA; Liberty/Capitol/EMI; Surfdog; UMe; New Haven
- Website: glencampbell.com

Glen Travis Campbell (April 22, 1936 – August 8, 2017) was an American country musician and actor. He was best known for a series of hit songs in the 1960s and 1970s, and for hosting The Glen Campbell Goodtime Hour on CBS television from 1969 until 1972. A revered session guitarist before breaking through as a solo performer, Campbell released 64 albums in a career that spanned five decades, selling over 45 million records worldwide, including twelve gold albums, four platinum albums, and one double-platinum album.

Born in Billstown, Arkansas, Campbell began his professional career as a studio musician in Los Angeles, spending several years playing with the group of instrumentalists later known as "The Wrecking Crew". After he became a solo artist, 80 of his songs made it onto the Billboard Country Chart, the Billboard Hot 100, or the Adult Contemporary Chart; 29 of those made the top ten, and nine of them reached number one, on at least one of those charts. Among Campbell's hits are "Universal Soldier" (his first hit from 1965), "Gentle on My Mind" (1967), "By the Time I Get to Phoenix" (1967), "Dreams of the Everyday Housewife" (1968), "Wichita Lineman" (1968), "Galveston" (1969), "Rhinestone Cowboy" (1975), and "Southern Nights" (1977).

In 1967, Campbell won four Grammys in the country and pop categories. For "Gentle on My Mind", he received two awards in country and western; "By the Time I Get to Phoenix" did the same in pop. Three of his early hits later won Grammy Hall of Fame Awards (2000, 2004, 2008), while Campbell himself won the Grammy Lifetime Achievement Award in 2012. He owned trophies for Male Vocalist of the Year from both the Country Music Association (CMA) and the Academy of Country Music (ACM), and took the CMA's top award as 1968 Entertainer of the Year. Campbell played a supporting role in the film True Grit (1969), which earned him a Golden Globe nomination for Most Promising Newcomer. He also sang the title song, which was nominated for an Academy Award. Campbell announced he was diagnosed with Alzheimer's disease in 2011 and retired in 2013 after recording his final song, "I'm Not Gonna Miss You". He died from the disease on August 8, 2017, at the age of 81.

== Early life ==
Glen Travis Campbell was born on April 22, 1936, in Billstown, a tiny community near Delight in Pike County, Arkansas, to John Wesley Campbell (a sharecropper) and Carrie Dell (née Stone) Campbell. Campbell was of Scottish descent and was the seventh son of 12 children. As a child he almost died from drowning. His family went to the Church of Christ, and Campbell's brother Lindell became a Church of Christ minister. In 2011, Campbell said his mother was Irish; although she was born in the United States, her family had emigrated from County Tipperary. The family lived on a farm, where they barely managed, by growing cotton, corn, watermelons and potatoes. "We had no electricity," he said, and money was scarce. "A dollar in those days looked as big as a saddle blanket." To supplement income, the family picked cotton for other farmers. "I picked cotton for $1.25 a hundred pounds," Campbell said. "If you worked your tail off, you could pick 80 or 90 pounds a day."

Campbell started playing guitar at age 4 after his father gave him a Sears-bought five-dollar guitar as a gift, with his uncle Boo teaching him the basics of how to play. Most of his family was musical, he said. "Back home, everybody plays and sings." By the time he was 6 he was performing on local radio stations.

Campbell continued playing guitar in his youth, with no formal training, and practiced when he was not working in the cotton fields. He developed his talent by listening to radio and records and considered Django Reinhardt among his most admired guitarists, later calling him "the most awesome player I ever heard." He dropped out of school in the 10th grade at 14 to work in Houston alongside his brothers, installing insulation and later working at a gas station.

Not satisfied with that kind of work, Campbell started playing music at fairs and church picnics and singing gospel hymns in the church choir. He was able to find spots performing on local radio stations, and after his parents moved to Houston, he made some appearances at a local nightclub.

In 1954, at age 17, Campbell moved to Albuquerque, New Mexico, to join his uncle's band, known as Dick Bills and the Sandia Mountain Boys. He also appeared there on his uncle's radio show and on K Circle B Time, the local children's program on KOB television. It was there that he met his first wife, whom he married when he was 18 and she was 16.

In 1958, Campbell formed his own band, the Western Wranglers. "We worked hard," he said. "Six, sometimes seven nights a week. I didn't have my eye set on any specific goals or big dreams."

== Career ==
=== 1960–1966: Early career ===
He played with all kinds of genres, with different instrumentation and different styles. If it was a just and righteous world, Glen would be credited as one of the great, seminal influences of all time. He was a secret weapon in the armory of Sixties record producers.

— Singer-songwriter Jimmy Webb

In 1960, Campbell moved to Los Angeles to become a session musician. That October, he joined the Champs. By January 1961, Campbell had found a daytime job at publishing company, American Music, writing songs and recording demos. Because of these demos Campbell soon was in demand as a session musician and became part of a group of studio musicians later known as the Wrecking Crew.

Campbell played on recordings by the Beach Boys, Bobby Darin, Frank Sinatra, Ricky Nelson, Dean Martin, Nat King Cole, the Monkees, Nancy Sinatra, Merle Haggard, Jan and Dean, Bing Crosby, Phil Spector, Sammy Davis Jr., Doris Day, Bobby Vee, the Everly Brothers, Shelley Fabares, the Cascades, Paul Revere & the Raiders, Wayne Newton, the First Edition, the Kingston Trio, Roger Miller, Gene Clark, Lou Rawls, Claude King, Lorne Greene, Ronnie Dove, and Elvis Presley. He befriended Presley when he helped record the soundtrack for Viva Las Vegas in 1964. He later said, "Elvis and I were brought up the same humble way – picking cotton and looking at the south end of a north-bound mule."

In May 1961, he left the Champs and was subsequently signed by Crest Records, a subsidiary of American Music. His first solo release, "Turn Around, Look at Me", a the Vogues cover, was a moderate success, peaked at number 62 on the Hot 100 in 1961 but reached number 7 on the Hot 100 in 1968. Campbell also formed the Gee Cees with former bandmembers from the Champs, performing at the Crossbow Inn in Van Nuys. The Gee Cees, too, released a single on Crest, the instrumental "Buzz Saw", which did not chart.

In 1962, Campbell signed with Capitol Records. After minor initial success with "Too Late to Worry, Too Blue to Cry", his first single for the label, and "Kentucky Means Paradise", released by the Green River Boys featuring Glen Campbell, a string of unsuccessful singles and albums followed. By 1963 his playing and singing were heard on 586 recorded songs. He never learned to read music, but besides guitar, he could play the banjo, mandolin and bass. Fellow Wrecking Crew member Leon Russell said Campbell "was the best guitar player I'd heard before or since. Occasionally we'd play with 50- or 60-piece orchestras. His deal was he didn't read [music], so they would play it one time for him, and he had it".

From 1964 on, Campbell began to appear on television as a regular on Star Route, a syndicated series hosted by Rod Cameron, ABC's Shindig! and Hollywood Jamboree.

From December 1964 to mid-May 1965, Campbell was a touring member of the Beach Boys, filling in for Brian Wilson, playing bass guitar and singing falsetto harmonies. He was then replaced on the Beach Boys' tours by new member Bruce Johnston. Brian Wilson produced and co-wrote a single for Campbell, "Guess I'm Dumb", which failed to chart despite what writer David Howard called "a surging, elegant Burt Bacharach-inspired string and horn arrangement and Campbell's forlorn Roy Orbison-like vocal."

In 1965, he had his biggest solo hit yet, reaching number 45 on the Hot 100 with a version of Buffy Sainte-Marie's "Universal Soldier". Asked about the pacifist message of the song, he said that "people who are advocating burning draft cards should be hung".

Campbell continued as a session musician, playing guitar on the Beach Boys' 1966 album Pet Sounds, among other recordings. In April of that year, he joined Rick Nelson on a tour through the Far East, again playing bass.

=== 1967–1972: Burning Bridges to The Goodtime Hour ===
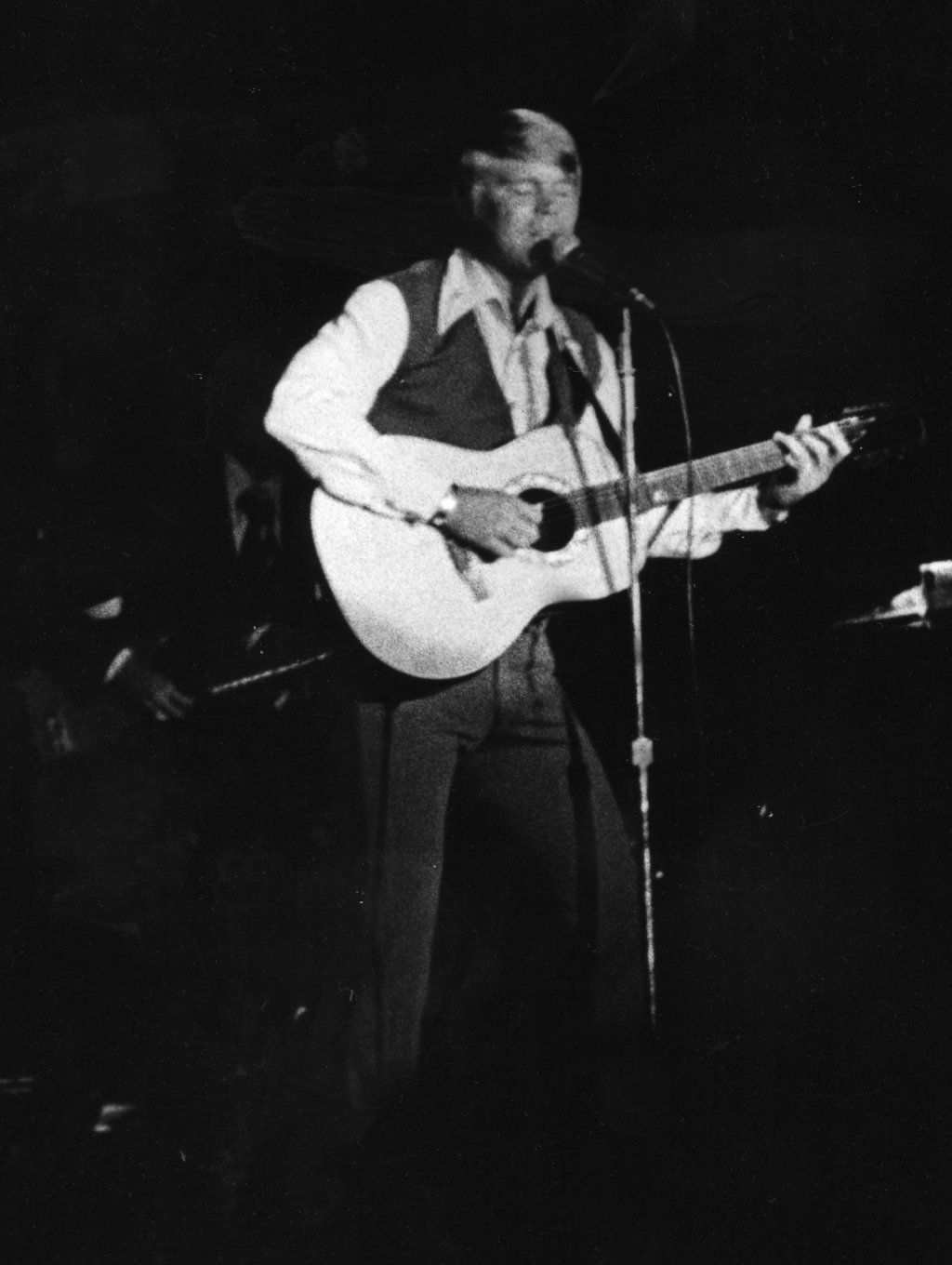
Campbell performing at the Michigan State Fair, c. 1970

When follow-up singles did not do well, and Capitol was considering dropping Campbell from the label in 1966, he was teamed with producer Al De Lory. Their first collaboration was "Burning Bridges", which became a top 20 country hit in early 1967, and the album of the same title.

Campbell and De Lory collaborated again on 1967's "Gentle on My Mind", written by John Hartford, which was an overnight success. The song was followed by the bigger hit "By the Time I Get to Phoenix" later in 1967, and "I Wanna Live" and "Wichita Lineman" in 1968, remaining on Billboard's Top 100 charts for 15 weeks. He won four Grammy Awards for "Gentle on My Mind" and "By the Time I Get to Phoenix".

In 1967, Campbell was also the uncredited lead vocalist on "My World Fell Down" by Sagittarius, a studio group. The song reached number 70 on the Billboard Hot 100.

In 1968, Campbell released "Wichita Lineman", a song written by Jimmy Webb. It was recorded with backing from members of The Wrecking Crew and appeared on his 1968 album of the same name. It reached number 3 on the US pop chart, remaining in the Top 100 for 15 weeks. In addition, the song also topped the American country music chart for two weeks, and the adult contemporary chart for six weeks.

The 1969 song "True Grit" by composer Elmer Bernstein and lyricist Don Black, and sung by Campbell, who co-starred in the movie, received nominations for the Academy Award for Best Song and the Golden Globe for Best Original Song.

After he hosted a 1968 summer replacement for television's The Smothers Brothers Comedy Hour variety show, Campbell was given his own weekly variety show, The Glen Campbell Goodtime Hour, which ran from January 1969 through June 1972. The show's comedy writers included Steve Martin and Rob Reiner. At the height of his popularity, a 1970 biography by Freda Kramer, The Glen Campbell Story, was published.

With Campbell's session-work connections, he hosted major names in music on his show, including the Beatles (on film), David Gates, Bread, the Monkees, Neil Diamond, Linda Ronstadt, Johnny Cash, Merle Haggard, Willie Nelson, Waylon Jennings, Roger Miller, and Mel Tillis. Campbell helped launch the careers of Anne Murray and Jerry Reed, who were regulars on his Goodtime Hour program.

During the late 1960s and early 1970s, Campbell released a long series of singles and appeared in the movies True Grit (1969) with John Wayne and Kim Darby and had the lead role in Norwood (1970) with Kim Darby and Joe Namath.

=== 1973–1979: "Rhinestone Cowboy" and "Southern Nights" ===
After the cancellation of his CBS series in 1972, Campbell remained a regular on network television. He co-starred in a made-for-television movie, Strange Homecoming (1974), with Robert Culp and up-and-coming teen idol Leif Garrett. He hosted a number of television specials, including 1976's Down Home, Down Under with Olivia Newton-John. He co-hosted the American Music Awards from 1976 to 1978 and headlined the 1979 NBC special Glen Campbell: Back to Basics with guest-stars Seals and Crofts and Brenda Lee. He was a guest on many network talk and variety shows, including Donny & Marie and The Tonight Show Starring Johnny Carson, where he performed "Rhinestone Cowboy". He also appeared on Cher, the Redd Foxx Comedy Hour, The Merv Griffin Show, The Midnight Special, DINAH!, Evening at Pops with Arthur Fiedler and The Mike Douglas Show.

In the mid-1970s, he had more hits with "Rhinestone Cowboy", "Southern Nights" (both U.S. number one hits), "Sunflower" (U.S. number 39) (written by Neil Diamond), and "Country Boy (You Got Your Feet in L.A.)" (U.S. number 11).

"Rhinestone Cowboy" was Campbell's largest-selling single and one of his best-known recordings, initially with over 2 million copies sold. Campbell had heard songwriter Larry Weiss' version while on tour of Australia in 1974. Both songs were in the October 4, 1975, Hot 100 top 10. "Rhinestone Cowboy" continues to be used in TV shows and films, including Desperate Housewives, Daddy Day Care, and High School High. It was the inspiration for the 1984 Dolly Parton/Sylvester Stallone movie Rhinestone. The main phrase of Campbell's recording was included in Dickie Goodman's Jaws movie parody song "Mr. Jaws". Campbell also made a techno/pop version of the song in 2002 with UK artists Rikki & Daz and went to the top 10 in the UK with the dance version and related music video.

In January 1975, Campbell was awarded 4 gold records along with a platinum award for wholesale sales in excess of $1 million in Australia.

"Southern Nights", by Allen Toussaint, his other number one pop-rock-country crossover hit, was generated with the help of Jimmy Webb and Jerry Reed, who inspired the famous guitar lick introduction to the song, which was the most-played jukebox number of 1977.

From 1971 to 1983, Campbell was the celebrity host of the Los Angeles Open, an annual professional golf tournament on the PGA Tour.

=== 1980–2010: Later career ===
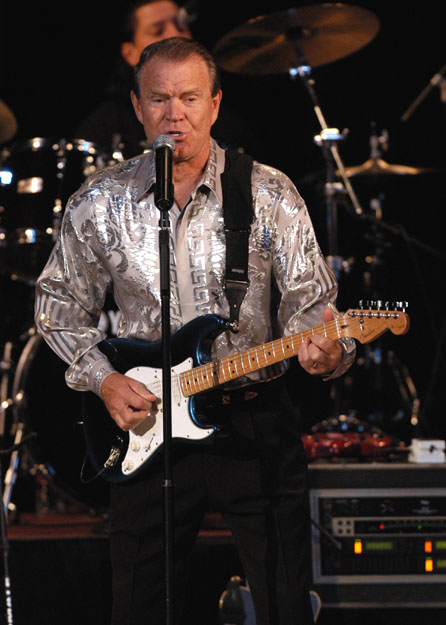
Campbell performing in Texas, January 2004

Campbell made a cameo appearance in the 1980 Clint Eastwood movie Any Which Way You Can, for which he recorded the title song.

From 1982 to 1983, he hosted a 30-minute syndicated music show, The Glen Campbell Music Show.

Campbell gave up smoking in March 1992 and believed it improved his singing voice. In 1991, Campbell voiced Chanticleer the rooster in Don Bluth's live action/animated film Rock-a-Doodle.

In 1999 he was featured on VH1's Behind the Music and on A&E Network's Biography and a PBS "in concert" special in 2001. He also appeared on a number of CMT programs, where he ranked among their Greatest Men of Country Music.

He is credited with giving Alan Jackson his first big break after Jackson recorded with Campbell's music publishing business in the early 1990s. Campbell also served as an inspiration to Keith Urban, who cites Campbell as a strong influence on his performing career.

In 2005, Campbell was inducted into the Country Music Hall of Fame. Campbell was inducted into the Musicians Hall of Fame and Museum in the first group of inductees alongside other members of the Wrecking Crew in 2007. It was announced in April 2008 that Campbell was returning to his signature label, Capitol, to release his new album, Meet Glen Campbell. The album was released on August 19. With this album, he branched off in a different musical direction, covering tracks from artists such as Travis, U2, Tom Petty and the Heartbreakers, Jackson Browne, and Foo Fighters. It was Campbell's first release on Capitol in over 15 years. Musicians from Cheap Trick and Jellyfish contributed to the album as well. The first single, a cover of Green Day's "Good Riddance (Time of Your Life)", was released to radio in July 2008.

In March 2010, Campbell announced the release of an album titled Ghost on the Canvas. Intended as a farewell album, it served as a companion to Meet Glen Campbell (2008).

=== 2011–2013: Illness and retirement ===
In June 2011, Campbell announced he had been diagnosed with Alzheimer's disease six months earlier. Following his diagnosis, Campbell embarked on a final "Goodbye Tour", with three of his children joining him in his backup band. He was too ill to travel to Australia and New Zealand in the summer of 2012. His final show was on November 30, 2012, in Napa, California.

After the end of the tour, Campbell entered the studio in Nashville to record what would be his final album, Adiós, which would not be revealed until five years later. According to his wife Kim, he wanted to preserve "what magic was left" in what would be his final recordings. In January 2013, Campbell recorded his final song, "I'm Not Gonna Miss You", during what would be his last recording sessions. The song, which is featured in the 2014 documentary Glen Campbell: I'll Be Me, was released on September 30, 2014, with the documentary following on October 24. Directed by longtime friend James Keach, the documentary examined Campbell's Alzheimer's diagnosis and how it affected his musical performances during his final tour across the United States with his family. The documentary received critical acclaim, earning a rare 100% rating on Rotten Tomatoes.

On January 15, 2015, Campbell and fellow songwriter Julian Raymond were nominated for Best Original Song at the 87th Academy Awards.

In March 2016, it was confirmed that Campbell was in the final stages of Alzheimer's disease.

On August 30, 2016, during the 10th Annual ACM Honors, Keith Urban, Blake Shelton and others performed a medley of Campbell's songs in tribute to him. His wife Kim accepted the Career Achievement Award on his behalf. Alice Cooper described him as being one of the five best guitar players in the music industry.

Campbell's final album, Adiós, featuring twelve songs from his final 2012–13 sessions, was announced in April 2017. It was released on June 9, 2017. Adiós was named by the UK's Official Charts Company as the best-selling country/Americana album of 2017 in Britain.

In 2024, Glen Campbell Duets: Ghost on the Canvas Sessions was released. It is a reworked version of Ghost on the Canvas, featuring newly recorded guest vocals performing posthumous duets with Campbell, from artists such as Carole King, Elton John, Eric Clapton, Hope Sandoval and Dolly Parton.

Campbell and Waylon Jennings wrote the song Diamonds together and on the night of December 28, 1978 recorded the song which sat in Jennings archives,unreleased for decades. Diamonds was released on June 21, 2026 as the titletrack to the second installment, in a trio of posthumous albums for Waylon released by his son, Shooter Jennings. Waylon gives verbal credit to Campbell in the song.

== Personal life ==
=== Relationships and children ===
Campbell was married four times and fathered six sons and three daughters:

- In 1955, Campbell married Diane Marie Kirk (born January 3, 1939; died July 16, 2015) at the Bernalillo County, New Mexico, courthouse. They had two children—Glen Travis Campbell Jr., who was born two months prematurely on July 25, 1955, and died a few days later; and Deborah Kay "Debby" (born September 21, 1956). After a mandatory 12-month separation, they divorced in 1959.
- On September 20, 1959, Campbell married Billie Jean Nunley (1939–1993), an Albuquerque beautician, who gave birth to Kelli Glen, William Travis, and Wesley Kane. Billie Campbell filed for divorce in 1975, and their divorce was final in 1976.
- On September 2, 1976, Campbell married singer Mac Davis's second wife, Sarah Jan Davis (née Barg) in Carson City, Nevada. They had one child named Dillon and divorced in 1980.

After his divorce from Sarah Barg Davis, Campbell began a relationship with fellow country artist Tanya Tucker. The relationship was marked by frequent tabloid gossip and articles. The couple recorded a number of songs together, including the single "Dream Lover", and they performed the national anthem together at the 1980 Republican National Convention.

- Campbell married Kimberly "Kim" Woollen (born June 18, 1958) in 1982. The couple met on a blind date in 1981 when Woollen was a Radio City Music Hall "Rockette". Together they had three children: Cal, Shannon, and Ashley. All three joined Campbell onstage starting in 2010 as part of his touring band.

=== Religion ===
Campbell was raised in the Church of Christ. In the 1980s, he joined a Baptist church in Phoenix, Arizona, along with his wife Kim. In a 2008 interview, Campbell said that they had been adherents of Messianic Judaism for two decades.

=== Alcoholism and drug addiction ===
Campbell began having problems with alcoholism and cocaine addiction in the 1970s. He credited his fourth wife Kim with helping him turn his life around. Campbell eventually stopped drinking alcohol and taking drugs in 1987. However, it was evident that he had relapsed in 2003 when he pleaded guilty in Arizona to aggravated drunk driving and leaving the scene of an accident and spent 10 days in Maricopa County jail.

=== Politics ===
On The Glen Campbell Goodtime Hour television show, Campbell avoided political topics. Around this time, in interviews he described himself as "a registered Democrat", but also said he "voted Republican a few times", and he performed in support of both Republican and Democratic politicians. Campbell performed the National Anthem at the 1980 Republican National Convention and continued to make a number of campaign appearances for Republican candidates during the 1980s.

== Death, legacy and tributes ==
In June 2011, Campbell announced he had been diagnosed with Alzheimer's disease six months earlier. He became a patient at an Alzheimer's long-term care and treatment facility in 2014. Campbell died in Nashville, Tennessee, on August 8, 2017, at the age of 81. He was buried at his family cemetery in Billstown, Arkansas.

In June 2020, Campbell's wife of 34 years, Kim Campbell, published Gentle on My Mind: In Sickness and in Health with Glen Campbell, a memoir of their life together.

=== Tributes and acclaim ===
Following the announcement of Campbell's death, fellow musicians, friends and fans expressed their condolences and noted his music legacy. Recording Academy president Neil Portnow praised him for having been "an American treasure" whose songs, guitar work, and "dazzling showmanship shot him to superstardom in the 1960s" to make him one of the most successful music artists in history.

Tributes poured in from countless others in the industry, including Brian Wilson of the Beach Boys, comedy writer and actor Steve Martin, Sheryl Crow, Dolly Parton, Lenny Kravitz, and Anne Murray. Campbell's former partner Tanya Tucker wrote and released a song in his honor, "Forever Loving You".

Jimmy Webb, who wrote many of Campbell's hits and worked with him throughout his life, said that Campbell could play with "any guitar player in the world, from George Benson to Eric Clapton", adding that Paul McCartney considered him among the best guitar players. "People will realize what an extraordinary genius Glen really was", Webb told ABC News.

The Country Music Television Channel (CMT) aired a special about his career a few days after his death. Other networks were also "lining up to honor his life and brilliant legacy", including interviews with Keith Urban, Reba McEntire and Blake Shelton, among others.

Campbell's daughter Ashley was invited to perform at The O2 Arena in London as part of the C2C: Country to Country festival. Her set was billed as a special tribute to her father and included a medley of his hits alongside "Remembering", a song she wrote about Campbell's battle with Alzheimer's.

== Discography and videography ==
Campbell recorded and released 60 studio albums and six live albums between 1962 and 2017. He also lent his vocals to four soundtracks for motion pictures: True Grit (1969), Norwood (1970), Rock-a-Doodle (1992), and the 2014 documentary film Glen Campbell: I'll Be Me. He placed a total of 82 singles (one of which was a re-release) on either the Billboard Country Chart, the Billboard Hot 100, or the Adult Contemporary Chart, nine of which peaked at number one on at least one of those charts. He released 15 video albums and featured in 21 music videos. His first two music videos, "By the Time I Get to Phoenix" and "Wichita Lineman", were directed by Gene Weed in 1967 and 1968, respectively. Campbell released his final music video, "I'm Not Gonna Miss You", in 2014 to coincide with the release of the documentary Glen Campbell: I'll Be Me. His final studio album, Adiós, was released on June 9, 2017.

In May 2019, it was announced that Glen Campbell's The Legacy box set was to be expanded and reissued.

=== Solo studio albums ===
- Too Late to Worry – Too Blue to Cry (1963)
- The Astounding 12-String Guitar of Glen Campbell (1964)
- The Big Bad Rock Guitar of Glen Campbell (1965)
- Mr. 12 String Guitar (1966)
- Burning Bridges (1967)
- Gentle on My Mind (1967)
- By the Time I Get to Phoenix (1967)
- Hey Little One (1968)
- A New Place in the Sun (1968)
- That Christmas Feeling (1968)
- Wichita Lineman (1968)
- Galveston (1969)
- Try a Little Kindness (1970)
- Oh Happy Day (1970)
- The Glen Campbell Goodtime Album (1970)
- The Last Time I Saw Her (1971)
- The Artistry of Glen Campbell (1972)
- Glen Travis Campbell (1972)
- I Knew Jesus (Before He Was a Star) (1973)
- I Remember Hank Williams (1973)
- Houston (I'm Comin' to See You) (1974)
- Reunion: The Songs of Jimmy Webb (1974)
- Rhinestone Cowboy (1975)
- Bloodline (1976)
- Southern Nights (1977)
- Basic (1978)
- Highwayman (1979)
- Somethin' 'Bout You Baby I Like (1980)
- It's the World Gone Crazy (1981)
- Old Home Town (1982)
- Letter to Home (1984)
- No More Night (1985)
- It's Just a Matter of Time (1985)
- Still Within the Sound of My Voice (1987)
- Light Years (1988)
- Favorite Hymns (1989)
- Walkin' in the Sun (1990)
- Unconditional Love (1991)
- Show Me Your Way (1991)
- Wings of Victory (1992)
- Somebody Like That (1993)
- Home for the Holidays (1993)
- The Boy in Me (1994)
- Christmas with Glen Campbell (1995)
- A Glen Campbell Christmas (1998)
- My Hits and Love Songs (1999)
- Love Is the Answer:
  24 Songs of Faith, Hope and Love (2004)
- Meet Glen Campbell (2008)
- Ghost on the Canvas (2011)
- See You There (2013)
- Adiós (2017)

=== Posthumous solo albums ===
- Sings for the King (2018)

=== Video albums ===
- An Evening with Glen Campbell and the Royal Philharmonic (1985)
- Glen Campbell Live (1986)
- The Glen Campbell Goodtime Hour with Special Guest Stars: John Wayne, Tim Conway, Carol Burnett, Three Dog Night (1990)
- The Glen Campbell Music Show with Special Guest Star: Roger Miller (1990)
- The Glen Campbell Music Show with Special Guest Star: Willie Nelson (1990)
- Live at the Dome (1991)
- Branson Video Classics Glen Campbell Goodtime Show (1994)
- Christmas with Glen Campbell (1996)
- Glen Campbell in Concert (2001)
- Good Times Again (2007)
- Best of The Glen Campbell Music Show (2007)
- Glen Campbell and Friends (2007)
- Through the Years Live - Ultimate Collection (2011)
- Glen Campbell and Jimmy Webb: In Session (with Jimmy Webb, 2012)
- Glen Campbell American Treasure (2012)
- Glen Campbell Goodtime Hour Christmas Specials (2015)
- Glen Campbell Goodtime Hour Country Special (2016)

== Filmography ==
Year	Title	Role	Notes
1965	Baby the Rain Must Fall	Band Member	
1967	The F.B.I.	Larry Dana	Episode: "Force of Nature"
1967	The Cool Ones	Patrick	
1969	True Grit	La Boeuf	Also contributed to soundtrack.
1970	Norwood	Norwood Pratt	
1974	Strange Homecoming	Bill Hasley	TV movie
1976	Christmas in Disneyland	Grandpa Jones / Disneyland visitor	TV movie
1980	Any Which Way You Can	Singer at Million Dollar Cowboy Bar	
1986	Uphill All the Way	Capt. Hazeltine	
1991	Rock-a-Doodle	Chanticleer	Voice
1997	Players	Jesse Dalton	Episode: "In Concert"

== Awards and honors ==
=== Grammy Awards ===
Year	Category	Work	Result
1967	Best Male Country Vocal Performance	"Gentle on My Mind"	Won
1967	Best Country & Western Recording	"Gentle on My Mind"	Won
1967	Best Vocal Performance, Male	"By the Time I Get to Phoenix"	Won
1967	Best Contemporary Vocal Performance, Male	"By the Time I Get to Phoenix"	Won
1968	Album of the Year	By the Time I Get to Phoenix	Won
1968	Best Country Vocal Performance, Male	"I Wanna Live"	Nominated
1968	Best Contemporary-Pop Vocal Performance, Male	"Wichita Lineman"	Nominated
1968	Record of the Year	"Wichita Lineman"	Nominated
1975	Best Country Vocal Performance, Male	"Country Boy (You Got Your Feet in L.A.)"	Nominated
1975	Best Pop Vocal Performance, Male	"Rhinestone Cowboy"	Nominated
1975	Record of the Year	"Rhinestone Cowboy"	Nominated
1980	Best Country Vocal Performance by a Duo or Group	"Dream Lover" (duet with Tanya Tucker)	Nominated
1985	Best Inspirational Performance	No More Night	Nominated
1987	Best Country & Western Vocal Performance – Duet	"The Hand That Rocks the Cradle" (with Steve Wariner)	Nominated
1987	Best Country & Western Vocal Performance – Duet	"You Are" (with Emmylou Harris)	Nominated
2000	Grammy Hall of Fame Award	"Wichita Lineman"	Won
2004	Grammy Hall of Fame Award	"By the Time I Get to Phoenix"	Won
2008	Grammy Hall of Fame Award	"Gentle on My Mind"	Won
2012	Grammy Lifetime Achievement Award		Won
2014	Best Country Song	"I'm Not Gonna Miss You" (shared with co-writer Julian Raymond)	Won
2014	Best Song Written for Visual Media	"I'm Not Gonna Miss You"	Nominated
2018	Best American Roots Performance	"Arkansas Farmboy"	Nominated

=== Academy of Country Music ===
Year	Category	Work	Result
1967	Single of the Year	"Gentle on My Mind"	Won
1967	Album of the Year	Gentle on My Mind	Won
1967	Top Male Vocalist		Won
1968	Album of the Year	Bobbie Gentry and Glen Campbell	Won
1968	Top Male Vocalist		Won
1968	TV Personality of the Year		Won
1971	TV Personality of the Year		Won
1975	Single of the Year	"Rhinestone Cowboy"	Won
1998	Pioneer Award		Won
2014	Video of the Year	"I'm Not Gonna Miss You"	Nominated
2016	Career Achievement Award		Won

=== American Music Awards ===
- 1976: Favorite Pop/Rock Single – "Rhinestone Cowboy"
- 1976: Favorite Country Single – "Rhinestone Cowboy"
- 1977: Favorite Country Album – Rhinestone Cowboy

=== Country Music Association Awards ===
- 1968: Entertainer of the Year
- 1968: Male Vocalist of the Year
- 2017: Musical Event of the Year – "Funny How Time Slips Away" with Willie Nelson

=== GMA Dove Awards ===
- 1986: Album by a Secular Artist – No More Night
- 1992: Southern Gospel Recorded Song of the Year – "Where Shadows Never Fall"
- 2000: Country Album of the Year – A Glen Campbell Christmas

=== Other honors ===
- 1968: Music Operators of America (MOA) Awards – Artist of the Year
- 1970: Golden Globe Award nomination for Best New Star of the Year – Actor in the movie "True Grit"
- 1974: Country Music Association of Great Britain's Entertainer of the Year
- 2005: Country Music Hall of Fame induction
- 2008: Q Legend Award
- 2012: Country Radio Broadcasters, Inc. Career Achievement Award
- 2014: Hollywood Music in Media Awards Lifetime Achievement Award
- 2014: Academy Award nomination for "I'm Not Gonna Miss You" (co-writer)
- 2018: Arkansas Country Music Awards – Lifetime Achievement Award

=== Books ===
- Campbell, Debby (2014). Glen Campbell: Life with My Father. With Maek Bego. Omnibus Press. ISBN 978-1-4683-0965-2.
- Campbell, Glen (1994). Rhinestone Cowboy. With Tom Carter. St. Martine's Press. ISBN 0-312-95679-7.
