= Show Me Your Way =

Studio album by Glen Campbell
- Released: 6 September 1991
- Recorded: 1991
- Studio: Creative Recording (Berry Hill, Tennessee)
- Genre: Contemporary Christian
- Label: New Haven
- Producer: Jonathan David Brown, Ken Harding, Bergen White

Glen Campbell chronology
| Unconditional Love (1991) | Show Me Your Way (1991) | Rock-A-Doodle (1992) |

Professional ratings
Review scores
| Source | Rating |
|---|---|
| Allmusic | 2/5 stars |

Show Me Your Way is the forty-eighth album by American singer/guitarist Glen Campbell, released in 1991.

== Track listing ==
1. "The Greatest Gift of All" (T.J. Kuenster) (duet with Russ Taff) – 4:41
2. "Jesus and Me" (Phil Driscoll, Lari Goss) – 2:56
3. "Where I Am Going" (Jimmy Webb) – 4:09
4. "The Wayward Son" (Geoff Thurman, Jamie Page) – 4:12
5. "Unto the Least of These" (Phillip Sandifer, Bob Bennett) – 4:06
6. "Show Me Your Way" (Craig Fall) (duet with Anne Murray) – 3:18
7. "The Savior I Sing of Today" (Jerry Crutchfield) – 2:57
8. "A Few Good Men" (Steve Hardin) – 3:51
9. "Where Shadows Never Fall" (Carl Jackson, Jim Weatherly) (duet with Kelly Nelon Thompson) – 3:00
10. "The Four Horsemen" (Jimmy Webb) – 5:05

== Personnel ==
- Glen Campbell – vocals, acoustic guitar
- Tom Hemby – acoustic guitar
- Shane Keister – keyboards
- Phil Nash – keyboards
- Dann Huff – electric guitar
- Paul Leim – drums
- Gary Lunn – bass guitar
- David Hungate – bass guitar
- Farrell Morris – percussion
- Carl Morris – synthesizer
- Wendy Suit Johnson, Lisa Silver, Bergen White, Geoff Thurman, Chris Harris, Christ Church Choir, Chris Rodriguez – background vocals
- The "A" Strings – strings

== Production ==
- Executive producer – Bill Gaither
- Producers – Jonathan David Brown, Ken Harding, Bergen White
- Recorded by Jonathan David Brown
- Arranged by Bergen White
- Photography – Peter Nash
- Art direction – Larry Newlon/Powell Creative Group
- Assistant engineers – Patrick Kelly, Todd Robbins

== Charts ==
| Chart (1991) | Peak position |
|---|---|
| US Top Contemporary Christian (Billboard) | 19 |

Singles – CCM charts (United States)

| Year | Single | Christian Hit Radio | Adult Contemporary | Inspirational |
|---|---|---|---|---|
| 1991 | "The Greatest Gift of All" | 22 | 6 | 2 |
| 1991 | "The Wayward Son" | — | 8 | — |
| 1992 | "Jesus and Me" | — | 10 | 3 |
| 1992 | "Where I Am Going" | — | 8 | 4 |

== Awards ==
"Where Shadows Never Fall" won a Dove Award for Best Southern Gospel Song in 1991.
