= Wichita Lineman =

Single by Glen Campbell

from the album Wichita Lineman
- B-side: "Fate of Man"
- Released: October 26, 1968 (week of)
- Recorded: May 27, 1968; August 14, 1968
- Studio: Capitol Records; Hollywood, California, US
- Genre: Country; pop; country rock
- Length: 3:05
- Label: Capitol 2302
- Songwriter: Jimmy Webb
- Producer: Al De Lory

Glen Campbell singles chronology
"Gentle on My Mind" (re-released 1968)	"Wichita Lineman" (1968)	"Galveston" (1969)

Audio
- "Wichita Lineman" on YouTube

"Wichita Lineman" is a 1968 song written by Jimmy Webb for American country music artist Glen Campbell, who recorded it backed by members of the Wrecking Crew. Widely covered by other artists, it has been called "the first existential country song".

In 2021, Rolling Stone magazine's list of the "500 Greatest Songs of All Time" ranked "Wichita Lineman" at number 206. Singer-songwriter Bob Dylan considered it "the greatest song ever written" and British music journalist Stuart Maconie called it "the greatest pop song ever composed."

== Background and content ==
Webb wrote "Wichita Lineman" in response to Campbell's urgent phone request for a "place"-based or "geographical" song to follow up "By the Time I Get to Phoenix". His lyrical inspiration came while driving through the high plains of the Oklahoma panhandle past a long line of telephone poles, on one of which perched a lineman speaking into his handset. Webb "put himself atop that pole" with the phone in his hand as he imagined the lineman talking to his girlfriend. Despite its real-life roots lying elsewhere, Webb set his song in Wichita, Kansas.

Within hours of Campbell's plea from the recording studio, Webb delivered a demo that he regarded and labeled as an unfinished version of the song, warning producer/arranger Al De Lory that he had not completed a third verse or a bridge. "When I heard it I cried," Campbell said, "... because I was homesick." De Lory similarly found inspiration in the opening line. His uncle had been a lineman in Kern County, California: "I could visualize my uncle up a pole in the middle of nowhere. I loved the song right away."

Webb's concerns over his song's shortcomings were quickly addressed in the studio by adding a tremolo-infused Dano bass melodic interlude performed by Campbell, who had first made his reputation in the music industry as a session guitarist with the prolific but uncredited group of Los Angeles backing musicians known today as the Wrecking Crew, many of whom played on the recording. One of them, bassist Carol Kaye, contributed the descending six-note intro. A second six-note bass lick improvised by Kaye was copied for strings by De Lory and used as a fill between the two rhyming couplets of each verse.

All the orchestral arrangements are by De Lory, who evokes the phrase "singing in the wire" using high-pitched, ethereal violins to emulate the sonic vibrations commonly induced by wind blowing across small wires and conductors, making them whistle or resonate like an aeolian harp. Similarly, he employs a repeating, monotonic 'Morse code' keyboard/flute motif (Note: Originated by Jimmy Webb and played on his Gulbransen electric organ in the studio, where De Lory first noticed it.) to mimic the electronic sounds a lineman might hear through a telephone earpiece attached to a long stretch of 'raw' telephone or telegraph line; that is, without typical line equalization and filtering: "I can hear you through the whine."

Webb was surprised to learn that Campbell had recorded his song: "A couple of weeks later I ran into [Campbell] somewhere and I said, 'I guess you guys didn't like the song.' 'Oh, we cut that,' he said. 'It wasn't done! I was just humming the last bit!' 'Well, it's done now!'" After listening to the test acetates of the studio recording that Campbell had with him, Webb contributed the overdub of evocative, reverberating electronic notes and open chords heard in the intro and fadeout, respectively, of the finished track, played on his Gulbransen electric organ.

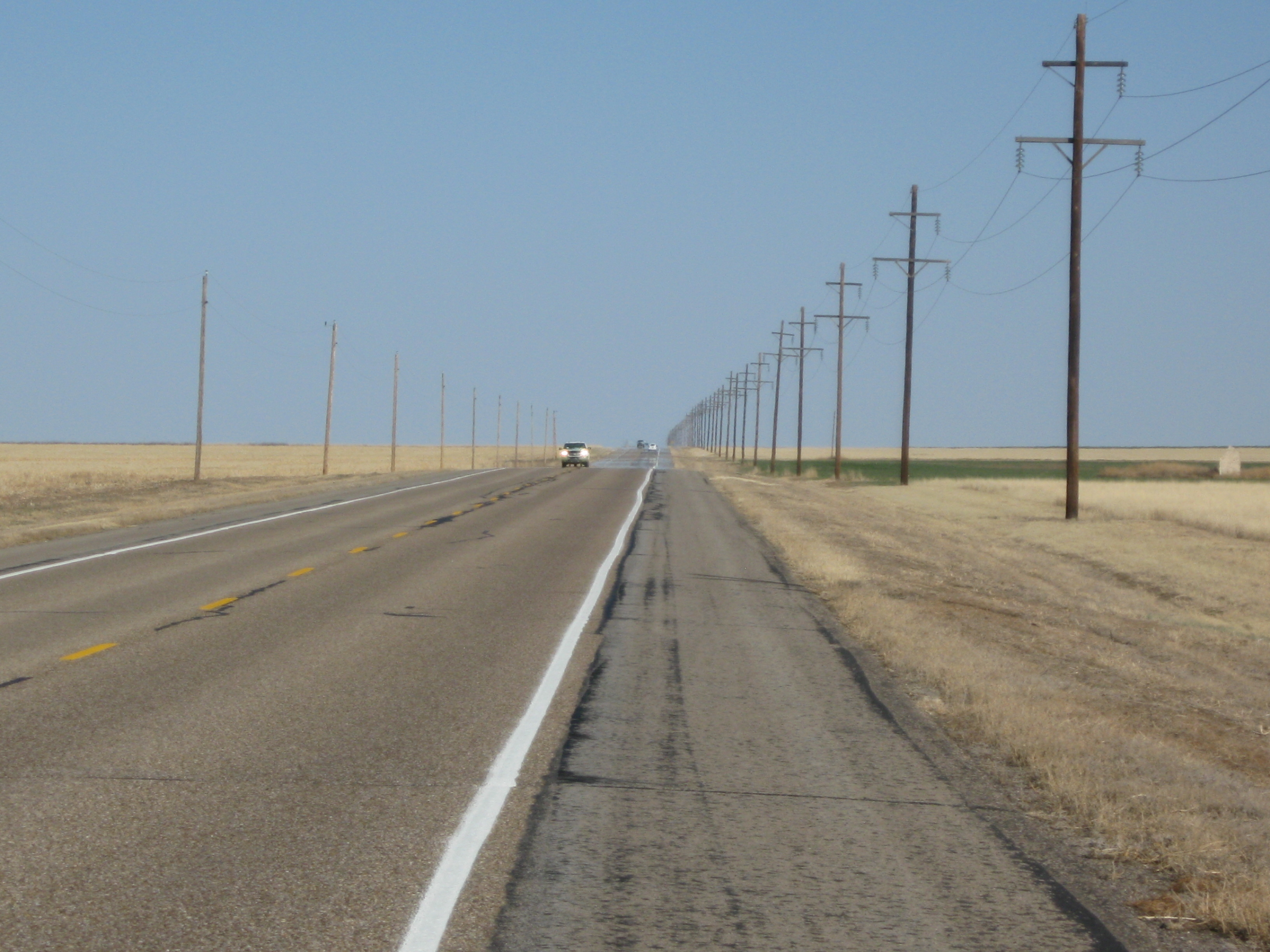
Route 412 in the Oklahoma panhandle, in Cimarron County near Boise City, looking east toward Guymon. (Phone lines to the left of the road, electricity transmission lines on the right; photo taken March 17, 2009.)

There's a place where the terrain absolutely flattens out. It's almost like you could take a level out of your tool kit and put it on the highway, and that bubble would just sit right there on dead centre. It goes on that way for about 50 miles. In the heat of summer, with the heat rising off the road, the telephone poles gradually materialize out of this far, distant perspective and rush toward you. And then, as it happened, I suddenly looked up at one of these telephone poles and there was a man on top, talking on a telephone. He was gone very quickly, and I had another 25 miles of solitude to meditate on this apparition. It was a splendidly vivid, cinematic image that I lifted out of my deep memory while I was writing this song. I thought, I wonder if I can write something about that? A blue-collar everyman guy we all see everywhere, working on the railroad or working on the telephone wires or digging holes in the street. I just tried to take an ordinary guy and open him up and say, 'Look, there's this great soul and there's this great aching and this great loneliness inside this person, and we're all like that. We all have this capacity for these huge feelings'.

—Jimmy Webb

== Structure ==
The song contains two verses, each divided into two parts. The first part is in the key of F major, while the second is in D major. D represents the relative minor key to F, so a D minor (as opposed to major) section would be expected. The fact that it is nevertheless set in D major is argued to contribute to the unique and appealing character of the song.

The lyrics follow the [dichotomy] set up by the contrasting musical keys. The first part of each verse (in F major) describes issues related to a lineman's job; for example, "searchin' in the sun for another overload" (Note: Overloads disable overhead power cables, not telephone lines, a lyrical inaccuracy which Webb would later defend as poetic license.) and "if it snows, that stretch down south won't ever stand the strain." The second part (in D major) details the lineman's romantic thoughts, including his well-known declaration, “And I need you more than want you / And I want you for all time.” Set against the F major brightness of the first part, the D major tonality of the second sounds distinctively mellow, which is consistent with its lyrical content.

Webb's melancholic, jazz-tinged chord progressions, laced with major sevenths and suspended fourths, reinforce the song's indeterminate nature by modulating from F major to D major and back without ever fully resolving. Writer Allen Morrison has noted that, after a broken F-major tonic chord is heard twice during the bass intro,

The song never does get ‘home’ again to the tonic – not in either verse, nor in the fadeout. This gorgeous musical setting suggests subliminally what the lyric suggests poetically: the lonely journeyman who remains suspended atop that telephone pole against that desolate prairie landscape, yearning for home.

== Chart success and sales ==
Glen Campbell's version, which appeared on his 1968 album of the same name, reached number 3 on the US pop chart, remaining in the Top 100 for 15 weeks. It topped the American country music chart for two weeks and the adult contemporary chart for six weeks. It was certified gold by the RIAA in January 1969. In Canada, the single topped both the RPM national and country singles charts. In the United Kingdom, it reached number 7.

=== Weekly charts ===
Chart (1968–1969)	Peak position
Australia (Go-Set)	15
Canada Top Singles (RPM)	1
Canada Country Singles (RPM)	1
Canada Adult Contemporary (RPM)	49
Ireland (IRMA)	12
New Zealand (Listener)	10
UK Singles (Official Charts)	7
US Hot Country Songs (Billboard)	1
US Billboard Hot 100	3
US Adult Contemporary (Billboard)	1
US Cash Box Top 100	2

=== Year-end charts ===
Chart (1969)	Rank
Canada (RPM) Top Singles	17
United Kingdom	56
US Cash Box	13

=== Certifications ===
Certifications for Wichita Lineman
Region	Certification	Certified units/sales
New Zealand (RMNZ)	Gold	15,000^{‡}
United Kingdom (BPI)	Gold	400,000^{‡}
United States (RIAA)	Gold	1,000,000^{^}
^{^} Shipments figures based on certification alone.^{‡} Sales+streaming figures based on certification alone.

== Legacy and accolades ==
In 2021, Rolling Stone magazine's list of the "500 Greatest Songs of All Time" ranked "Wichita Lineman" at number 206. BBC Radio described it as "one of those rare songs that seems somehow to exist in a world of its own – not just timeless but ultimately outside of modern music" and spotlighted it in series 12 of Soul Music, their long-running show documenting the stories behind influential music with a powerful emotional impact. Bob Dylan considered it "the greatest song ever written" and British music journalist Stuart Maconie called it "the greatest pop song ever composed." In 2017, Paste placed the song at number two on their list of the 12 greatest Glen Campbell songs; in their version, Billboard ranked it number three.

The single was inducted into the Grammy Hall of Fame in 2000. In 2019, the Library of Congress preserved the song in the National Recording Registry for being "culturally, historically, or aesthetically significant."

Journalist and author Dylan Jones published the book The Wichita Lineman: Searching in the Sun for the World's Greatest Unfinished Song in 2019, documenting the song's genesis and enduring legacy. In June 2026, CBS News included the song in its list of the 250 essential American songs of the past 250 years.

Billy Joel called Wichita Lineman "The perfect song" in an interview with Rick Beato in July 2026.

== Personnel ==
(Note: Based on the Phonograph Recording Contracts for the main recording sessions, with additions and corrections as described in the corresponding edit summaries.)

Basic instrumental (Note: Campbell overdubbed his vocal at a separate session.) tracks

(May 27, 1968)

- Glen Campbell – acoustic guitar,
  Danelectro Longhorn bass
- Al Casey – acoustic guitar
- Carol Kaye – Fender Precision bass
- Jim Gordon – drums
- Al De Lory – piano

Organ overdub

(mid-June, 1968)

- Jimmy Webb – Gulbransen organ

Orchestral overdub

(August 14, 1968)

Strings:

- Sid Sharp (concertmaster), Bill Kurasch, Lenny Malarsky, Bill Nuttycombe, Jerry Reisler, Ralph Schaeffer, Bob Sushel, Tibor Zelig – violin
- Sam Boghossian, Joe DiFiore – viola
- Jesse Ehrlic, Anne Goodman – cello
- Don Bagley – double bass

Horns:

- Bud Brisbois, Roy Caton, Virgil Evans – trumpet
- Dick Hyde, Dick Leith – trombone

Woodwinds:

- Jim Horn – flute

Keyboards:

- Al De Lory (arranger)
- Mike Melvoin

Percussion:

- Bob Felts – drums
- Norm Jeffries

== Cover versions ==
Many adult "middle of the road" (MOR) artists have recorded the song. There have also been many instrumental versions, including one by Johnny A. and another by José Feliciano. The song has also been covered by artists such as O.C. Smith, Willie Hutch, the Meters with vocals by Art Neville, Smokey Robinson and the Miracles, Kool and the Gang and Black Pumas. The Dick Slessig Combo created a 43 minute cover of the song.

Jazz pianist Laurence Hobgood recorded a version of the song combining a contemporary jazz trio with a string quartet. Other jazz artists making strong cover versions include Cassandra Wilson and the big band of John Hollenbeck.

Other covers of the song include that of Wade Hayes, who released a version in August 1997 that peaked at number 55 on the US country music charts. It was to have been included on an album entitled Tore Up from the Floor Up, but due to its poor chart performance, the album was delayed. That album was finally released in 1998 as When the Wrong One Loves You Right, with the "Wichita Lineman" cover excluded.

R.E.M. recorded a live version of the song in Houston on September 15, 1995 and released it in 1996 on "Bittersweet Me", the second in a series of CD Singles released from "New Adventures In Hi-Fi".

In 2016, the country-pop band Restless Heart also recorded a cover of the song.

Guns N' Roses has included the song live during their Not in This Life Time world tour. The first live performance of the song was on August 30, 2017, in Edmonton, Alberta, Canada. Rolling Stone magazine described it as "their most unexpected cover of the tour".

The Brian Setzer Orchestra covered the song live during their Christmas Rocks! 2017 tour and they perform the song on the Christmas Rocks! Live Blu-ray DVD that was released on November 9, 2018.

Former Men at Work frontman Colin Hay recorded and released a version of this song on his 2021 covers album I Just Don't Know What To Do With Myself.

Brett Kissel covered the song on his 2023 release The Compass Project – West Album.

In other languages

Lyrics that are loose translations of, or inspired by, Webb's song have been written in at least two other languages: German and Finnish.

A German language version written by Thomas Fritsch, "Der Draht in der Sonne" (English "The Wire In the Sun"), has also been covered by Katja Ebstein.

Finnish singer Topi Sorsakoski recorded a Finnish version of the song, titled Tie jatkuu äärettömiin ("The Road Goes On Forever"), on his album Yksinäisyys osa 2 in 1995.

== In popular culture ==
The song was used in the opening and closing scenes of the Ozark season 2 episode, "Badger", to emphasize the setting and tone of the beginning and end of Darlene and Jacob Snell's romance.

The song appears in the 2013 film (and accompanying soundtrack) Alan Partridge: Alpha Papa.

The track's fadeout was voiced over for many years by English DJ Steve Wright to close his BBC Radio shows.
