= By the Time I Get to Phoenix (song) =

1967 single by Glen Campbell

- German release picture sleeve

Single by Glen Campbell

from the album By the Time I Get to Phoenix
- B-side: "You've Still Got a Place in My Heart"
- Released: October 23, 1967
- Recorded: August 29, 1967
- Studio: Capitol, Hollywood
- Genre: Country pop
- Length: 2:42
- Label: Capitol
- Songwriter: Jimmy Webb
- Producer: Al De Lory

Glen Campbell singles chronology
"Gentle on My Mind" (1967)	"By the Time I Get to Phoenix" (1967)	"Hey Little One" (1968)

Official Audio
- "By The Time I Get To Phoenix" (Remastered 2001) on YouTube

"By the Time I Get to Phoenix" is a song written by Jimmy Webb. Originally recorded by Johnny Rivers in 1965, it was reinterpreted by American country music singer Glen Campbell on his album of the same name. Released on Capitol Records in 1967, Campbell's version topped RPM's Canada Country Tracks, reached number two on Billboard's Hot Country Singles chart, and won two awards at the 10th Annual Grammys. Broadcast Music, Inc. (BMI) named it the third most performed song from 1940 to 1990. The song was ranked number 20 on BMI's Top 100 Songs of the Century. Frank Sinatra called it "the greatest torch song ever written." It was No. 450 on Rolling Stone magazine's Top 500 Songs of All Time.

== Background and writing ==
The inspiration for "By the Time I Get to Phoenix" originated in Jimmy Webb's breakup with Susan Horton. They remained friends after her marriage to Bobby Ronstadt, a cousin of singer Linda Ronstadt. Their relationship, which peaked in mid-1965, was also the primary influence for "MacArthur Park", another Webb composition.

Webb did not intend the song to be geographically literal. "It's more of a song about something I wish I had done than something I really did, in that I did not get in my car and drive back to Oklahoma to punish this young woman for not reciprocating my love and affection. In fact, a guy approached me one night after a concert, and he had a map, and he had all the times, and he had a stopwatch. And he showed me how it was impossible for me to drive from L.A. to Phoenix, and then how far it was to Albuquerque and then -- in short, he told me, 'This song is impossible.' And so it is. It's a kind of fantasy about something I wish I would have done, and it sort of takes place in a twilight zone of reality."

Webb called the song a "succinct tale" that "sort of has an O. Henry-esque twist at the end, which consists merely of the guy saying, 'She didn't really think that I would go,' but he did." Although the protagonist in the song plans to leave his lover, Webb did not leave Horton: "I didn't go. I stayed for more punishment."

== Covers ==
In 1990, Broadcast Music, Inc. (BMI), which monitors songs in its role as a performance rights organisation, listed "By the Time I Get to Phoenix" as the third-most performed song from the period from 1970 to 1990, and in 1999 listed it as the 20th most performed of the 20th century. Many cover versions have been recorded. Charted versions include:

- Isaac Hayes' version of the song, included on the album Hot Buttered Soul, runs for 18 minutes and 40 seconds, and recounts the events that transpired before the actual roadtrip. The track was edited to under seven minutes for single release, hitting #37 on both the U.S. pop and R&B charts in 1969, and #48 in Canada. Nick Coleman of NME called the full version "the greatest Country & Western ever committed to vinyl."
- The Mad Lads covered the song in 1969 for Stax Records; their version reached #28 on the R&B singles chart and #56 in Canada.
- Wayne McGhie and the Sounds of Joy covered it on their 1970 album, which had little success at the time but was reissued on Light in the Attic Records in 2004.
- Anne Murray and Glen Campbell recorded a medley of "I Say a Little Prayer" and "By the Time I Get to Phoenix" in 1971. The track hit #1 on the Canadian country charts and charted on the U.S. country charts and the U.S. and Canadian pop charts (#19).
- Isaac Hayes and Dionne Warwick released the song as a live medley with "I Say a Little Prayer" in 1977. The single reached #65 on the R&B singles chart.
- By The Time I Get To Phoenix is the title of experimental hip-hop group Injury Reserve's 2021 album, the group's final record as group member Stepa J. Groggs died unexpectedly while the album was being recorded.

== Chart performance ==
Chart (1967–1968)	Peak position
US Hot Country Singles (Billboard)	2
US Billboard Hot 100	26
US Adult Contemporary (Billboard)	12
Canada Country Singles (RPM)	1
Canada Top Singles (RPM)	9
