= Glen Campbell discography =

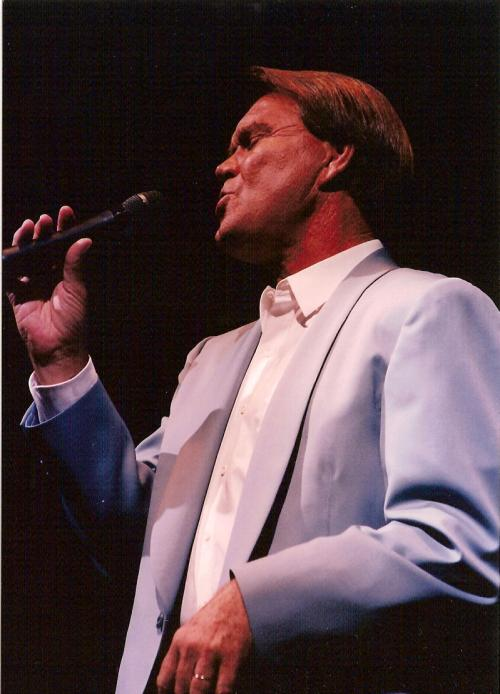
- Campbell at The Goodtime Theater, Branson, MO, 1996
- Studio albums: 65
- Soundtrack albums: 4
- Live albums: 7
- Compilation albums: 127
- Singles: 116
- #1 Singles (Overall): 17

This article presents the discography of American singer, songwriter, and guitarist Glen Campbell. Campbell recorded and released 60 studio albums and seven live albums between 1962 and 2017. He also lent his vocals to four soundtracks for motion pictures (True Grit, Norwood, Rock-a-Doodle, and Glen Campbell: I'll Be Me). He placed a total of 82 singles (one of which was a re-release) on either the Billboard country chart, the Billboard Hot 100, or the Adult Contemporary chart, nine of which peaked at No. 1 on at least one of those charts.

== Studio albums ==
=== 1960s ===
Title	Details	Peak chart positions				Certifications (sales thresholds)
Title	Details	US Country	US	CAN	UK	Certifications (sales thresholds)
Big Bluegrass Special (with Green River Boys)	Release date: 1962; Label: Capitol Records	—	—	—	—	
Too Late to Worry – Too Blue to Cry	Release date: 1963; Label: Capitol Records	—	—	—	—	
The Astounding 12-String Guitar of Glen Campbell	Release date: 1964; Label: Capitol Records	—	—	—	—	
The Big Bad Rock Guitar of Glen Campbell	Release date: 1965; Label: Capitol Records	—	—	—	—	
Burning Bridges	Release date: 1967; Label: Capitol Records	—	—	—	—	
Gentle on My Mind	Release date: 1967; Label: Capitol Records	1	5	3	—	US: Platinum
By the Time I Get to Phoenix	Release date: 1967; Label: Capitol Records	1	15	24	—	US: Platinum
Hey Little One	Release date: 1968; Label: Capitol Records	1	26	—	—	US: Gold
A New Place in the Sun	Release date: 1968; Label: Capitol Records	1	24	—	—	
Bobbie Gentry & Glen Campbell (with Bobbie Gentry)	Release date: 1968; Label: Capitol Records	1	11	8	50	US: Gold
That Christmas Feeling	Release date: 1968; Label: Capitol Records	—	—	—	—	US: Gold
Wichita Lineman	Release date: 1968; Label: Capitol Records	1	1	1	—	US: 2× Platinum
Galveston	Release date: 1969; Label: Capitol Records	1	2	4	—	US: Platinum
True Grit	Release date: 1969; Label: Capitol Records	—	77	—	—	
"—" denotes releases that did not chart

=== 1970s ===
Title	Details	Peak chart positions					Certifications (sales thresholds)
Title	Details	US Country	US	AUS	CAN	UK	Certifications (sales thresholds)
Try a Little Kindness	Release date: 1970; Label: Capitol Records	4	12	—	12	37	US: Gold
Oh Happy Day	Release date: 1970; Label: Capitol Records	16	38	—	38	—	
Norwood	Release date: 1970; Label: Capitol Records	36	90	—	—	—	
The Glen Campbell Goodtime Album ^{A}	Release date: 1970; Label: Capitol Records	2	27	—	23	16	
The Last Time I Saw Her	Release date: 1971; Label: Capitol Records	6	87	—	84	—	
Anne Murray / Glen Campbell (with Anne Murray)	Release date: 1971; Label: Capitol Records	4	128	—	12	—	
The Artistry of Glen Campbell	Release date: 1972; Label: Capitol Records	—	—	—	—	—	
Glen Travis Campbell	Release date: 1972; Label: Capitol Records	5	148	—	—	—	
I Knew Jesus (Before He Was a Star)	Release date: 1973; Label: Capitol Records	13	154	—	—	—	
I Remember Hank Williams	Release date: 1973; Label: Capitol Records	10	205	—	—	—	
Houston (I'm Comin' to See You)	Release date: 1974; Label: Capitol Records	12	—	70	—	—	
Reunion: The Songs of Jimmy Webb	Release date: 1974; Label: Capitol Records	18	166	85	—	—	
Ernie Sings & Glen Picks (with Tennessee Ernie Ford)	Release date: 1975; Label: Capitol Records	—	—	—	—	—	
Rhinestone Cowboy	Release date: 1975; Label: Capitol Records	1	17	54	7	38	US: Gold; BPI: Silver
Bloodline	Release date: 1976; Label: Capitol Records	2	63	88	58	—	
Southern Nights	Release date: 1977; Label: Capitol Records	1	22	95	4	51	US: Gold
Basic	Release date: 1978; Label: Capitol Records	17	164	—	—	—	
Highwayman ^{B}	Release date: 1979; Label: Capitol Records	—	—	—	—	—	
"—" denotes releases that did not chart

- ^{A}In the UK The Glen Campbell Goodtime Album was released as The Glen Campbell Album including two bonus tracks from the Oh Happy Day album.
- ^{B}Highwayman peaked at number 19 on the RPM Country Albums chart in Canada.

=== 1980s ===
Title	Details	Peak chart positions	
Title	Details	US Country	US
Somethin' 'Bout You Baby I Like	Release date: 1980; Label: Capitol Records	—	—
It's the World Gone Crazy	Release date: 1981; Label: Capitol Records	49	178
Old Home Town	Release date: 1982; Label: Atlantic Records	33	—
Letter to Home	Release date: 1984; Label: Atlantic Records	30	—
No More Night	Release date: 1985; Label: Word Records	—	—
It's Just a Matter of Time	Release date: 1985; Label: Atlantic Records	32	—
Still within the Sound of My Voice	Release date: 1987; Label: MCA Records	32	—
Light Years	Release date: 1988; Label: MCA Records	58	—
Favorite Hymns	Release date: 1989; Label: Word Records	—	—
"—" denotes releases that did not chart

=== 1990s ===
Title	Details	Peak positions	
Title	Details	US Christian	UK
Walkin' in the Sun	Release date: 1990; Label: Capitol Records	—	—
Unconditional Love	Release date: 1991; Label: Liberty Records	—	—
Show Me Your Way	Release date: 1991; Label: New Haven Records	19	—
Rock-A-Doodle	Release date: 1992; Label: Liberty Records	—	—
Wings of Victory	Release date: 1992; Label: New Haven Records	22	—
Somebody Like That	Release date: 1993; Label: Liberty Records	—	—
Home for the Holidays	Release date: 1993; Label: New Haven Records	—	—
The Boy in Me	Release date: 1994; Label: New Haven Records	—	—
Christmas with Glen Campbell	Release date: 1995; Label: Laserlight Records	—	—
A Glen Campbell Christmas	Release date: 1998; Label: TNN Classic Sessions	—	—
My Hits and Love Songs	Release date: 1999; Label: EMI	—	50
"—" denotes releases that did not chart

=== 2000s, 2010s, and 2020s ===
Title	Details	Peak chart positions			Certifications
Title	Details	US Country	US	UK	Certifications
Love Is the Answer: 24 Songs of Faith, Hope and Love	Release date: 2004; Label: Universal South	—	—	—	
Meet Glen Campbell	Release date: 2008; Label: Capitol	27	155	54	BPI: Silver
Ghost on the Canvas	Release date: 2011; Label: Surfdog	6	24	27	BPI: Silver
Glen Campbell and Jimmy Webb in Session (with Jimmy Webb)	Release date: 2012; Label: Fantasy	—	—	—	
See You There	Release date: August 13, 2013; Label: Surfdog	22	89	35	
Glen Campbell: I'll Be Me (EP)	Release date: September 30, 2014; Label: Big Machine	49	—	—	
Glen Campbell: I'll Be Me	Release date: February 17, 2015; Label: Big Machine	15	103	—	
Adiós	Release date: June 9, 2017; Label: Big Machine	7	40	2	BPI: Gold
Sings for the King^{A}	Release date: November 16, 2018; Label: Universal Music	—	—	84	
Duets - Ghosts on the Canvas Sessions	Release date: April 19, 2024; Label: Surfdog, Big Machine	—	—	—	
"—" denotes releases that did not chart

- ^{A}Compilation of previously unreleased demo recordings Campbell made for Elvis Presley. Includes one remixed track combining Campbell and Presley's vocals.

== Live albums ==
Title	Details	Peak chart positions				Certifications (sales thresholds)
Title	Details	US Country	US	CAN	UK	Certifications (sales thresholds)
Glen Campbell Live ^{A}	Release date: 1969; Label: Capitol Records	2	13	6	16	US: Gold; AUS: Gold
Live in Japan	Release date: 1975; Label: Capitol Records	—	—	—	—	
Live at the Royal Festival Hall	Release date: 1977; Label: Capitol Records	23	171	—	—	
Glen Campbell Live	Release date: 1981; Label: RCA Records/Energy	—	—	—	—	
Glen Campbell Live! His Greatest Hits	Release date: 1994; Label: Laserlight Records	—	—	—	—	
Glen Campbell in Concert with the South Dakota Symphony	Release date: 2001; Label: Columbia River	—	—	—	—	
Through the Years Live – Ultimate Collection ^{B}	Release date: 2011; Label: Full Fill	—	—	—	—	
Live from the Troubadour	Release date: 2021; Label: Big Machine Records	—	—	—	—	
"—" denotes releases that did not chart

- ^{A}In the UK the double album Glen Campbell Live was released as a single album.
- ^{B}Live at The Dome – Doncaster, England – 1990

== Compilations and re-issues ==
Year	Album	Chart positions				Certifications (sales thresholds)
Year	Album	US Country	US	AUS	UK	Certifications (sales thresholds)
1965	Country Shindig: Released: Label: Surrey	—	—	—	—	
1966	The 12 String Guitar of Glen Campbell: Released: Label: Pickwick	—	—	—	—	
1966	Glen Campbell Plays 12 String Guitar: Released: Label: Onacrest	—	—	—	—	
1968	I Wanna Live: Released: Label: Ember	—	—	—	—	
1968	Turn Around and Look at Me: Released: Label: Ember	—	—	—	—	
1968	Portrait: Released: Label: EMI-Capitol	—	—	—	—	AUS:Gold
1968	Guitar Gold (w/ Stan Capps): Released: Label: Customtone	—	—	—	—	
1968	Country Soul: Released: Label: Starday	—	—	—	—	
1969	Country Music Star No. 1: Released: Label: Starday	—	—	—	—	
1969	Where's the Playground Susie: Released: Label: Ember	—	—	—	—	
1969	This is Glen Campbell: Released: 1969; Label: Ember	—	—	—	—	AUS:Gold
1970	The Glen Campbell Album: Released: Label: PickWick	—	—	—	—	
1970	Limited Collector's Edition: Released: Label: Capitol	—	—	—	—	
1971	A Satisfied Mind: Released: Label: PickWick	—	—	—	—	
1971	Glen Campbell's Greatest Hits ^{A}: Released: Label: Capitol	3	39	24	8	RIAA: Platinum
1972	Gentle on My Mind: Released: Label: Longines Symphonette Recording Society	—	—	—	—	
1973	Words: Released: Label: Ember	—	—	—	—	
1973	The Good Time Songs of Glen Campbell: Released: Label: PickWick	—	—	—	—	
1975	More Words: Released: Label: Ember	—	—	—	—	
1975	I'll Paint You a Song: Released: Label: PickWick	—	—	—	—	
1975	Arkansas: Released: Label: Capitol	—	—	—	—	
1976	The Best of Glen Campbell: Released: Label: Capitol	11	—	—	—	
1976	Glen Campbell's Twenty Golden Greats: Released: Label: Capitol	—	—	24	1	BPI: Platinum
1978	20 Golden Hits: Released: Label: EMI	—	—	63	—	
1978	The Glen Campbell Collection: Released: Label: Capitol/TVLP	—	—	—	—	
1983	All I Have to Do Is Dream (/w Bobbie Gentry): Released: Label: Music For Pleasure	—	—	—	—	
1987	The Very Best of Glen Campbell: Released: Label: Capitol	—	—	—	—	
1989	The Complete Glen Campbell: Released: Label: Stylus	—	—	—	47	
1990	Presents His Hits in Concert ^{B}: Released: Label: Disky	—	—	—	—	
1990	Classics Collection: Released: Label: Liberty	—	—	—	—	
1990	Greatest Country Hits: Released: Label: Curb	—	—	—	—	
1991	Best of the Early Years: Released: Label: Curb	—	—	—	—	
1991	Merry Christmas: Released: Label: Liberty	—	—	—	—	
1993	All-Time Greatest Hits: Released: Label: CEMA Special Markets	—	—	—	—	
1995	The Essential Glen Campbell Volume One: Released: Label: Capitol	—	—	—	—	
1995	The Essential Glen Campbell Volume Two: Released: Label: Capitol	—	—	—	—	
1995	The Essential Glen Campbell Volume Three: Released: Label: Capitol	—	—	—	—	
1995	The Best of Glen Campbell: Released: Label: Music For Pleasure/EMI	—	—	—	—	BPI: Silver
1996	Jesus and Me: The Collection: Released: Label: New Haven	—	—	—	—	
1997	Home at Last: Released: Label: Word	—	—	—	—	
1997	The Glen Campbell Collection (1962-1989) Gentle on My Mind: Released: Label: Razor&Tie	—	—	—	—	
1998	The Capitol Years 65/77: Released: Label: EMI	—	—	—	—	
1999	Reunited with Jimmy Webb 1974-1988: Released: Label: Raven	—	—	—	—	
2000	Love Songs: Released: Label: Gold Label	—	—	—	—	
2000	Glen Campbell Christmas: Released: Label: EMI-Capitol Special Markets	—	—	—	—	
2000	Super Hits: Released: Label: Atlantic	—	—	—	—	
2000	20 Greatest Hits: Released: Label: Capitol	4	43	—	—	
2002	Rhinestone Cowboy/Bloodline The Lambert & Potter Sessions 1975-1976: Released: Label: Raven	—	—	—	—	
2003	Southern Nights/Basic: Released: Label: Raven	—	—	—	—	
2003	All the Best: Released: Label: Capitol	12	89	—		
2003	Rhinestone Cowboy: The Best of Glen Campbell: Released: Label: EMI	—	—	—	—	BPI: Silver
2003	The Legacy (1961-2002): Released: Label: Capitol	—	—	—	—	
2004	Rhinestone Cowboy (New Studio Recordings): Released: Label: Mastersong	—	—	—	—	
2004	Glen Campbell Collection: Released: Label: EMI Gold	—	—	—	—	
2005	Rhinestone Cowboy Live, on the Air & in the Studio ^{B}: Released: Label: Golden Stars	—	—	—	—	
2006	Sings the Best of Jimmy Webb 1967-1992: Released: Label: Raven	—	—	—	—	
2006	The Platinum Collection: Released: Label: Rhino	—	—	—	—	
2006	Classic Campbell: Released: Label: EMI	—	—	—	—	
2006	Words and Music ^{B}: Released: Label: Pegasus	—	—	—		
2008	Platinum: Released: Label: Capitol	—	—	—	—	
2009	Greatest Hits: Released: February 10, 2009; Label: Capitol	63	—	—	68	BPI: Gold
2011	Limited Edition: 2 CD Set: Released: Label: Curb	69	—	—	—	
2012	The Inspirational Collection: Released: Label: Word	—	—	—	—	
2012	12 String Guitars! Folk Blues & Bluegrass: Released: Label: Vintage Masters Inc.	—	—	—	—	
2013	Icon: Released: Label: Capitol	61	—	—	—	
2013	Gentle On My Mind: The Best Of Glen Campbell: Released: Label: Spectrum/Universal	—	—	—	—	BPI: Gold
"—" denotes releases that did not chart

- ^{A} Glen Campbell's Greatest Hits also peaked at No. 20 on the RPM Top Albums chart in Canada.
- ^{B} Complete or partial rerelease of 1981 live album Glen Campbell Live, in some cases mixed with other recordings.

== Album appearances ==
Below are listed albums by other/various artists on which Glen Campbell is (one of) the main performer(s) on one or several songs.

Year	Album	Artist	Songs	Chart positions		Label
Year	Album	Artist	Songs	US Country	US	Label
1963	Country Music Hootenanny	Various Artists	"You Took Her Off My Hands"	19		Capitol
1963	The Twelve String Story Volume 1	Various Artists	"Redwing"			Horizon
1963	The Twelve String Story Volume 2	Various Artists	"Bull Durem"			Horizon
1967	In the Heat of the Night OST	Quincy Jones	"Bowlegged Polly"			United Artists
1968	Golden Country Instrumentals	Various Artists	"Phoenix After Hours"			Starday
1969	The Christmas Sound of Music (B.F. Goodrich Presents)	Various Artists	"Silent Night", "The Night Before Christmas"			Capitol
1970	Proudly They Came... To Honor America	Various Artists	"The Impossible Dream" (live)			Landmark
1974	Magic Moments from the Tonight Show	Various Artists	"Indiana" (live)			Casablanca
1975	Good Friends Are For Keeps	Various Artists	"Good Friends Are For Keeps"			Bell
1976	The Wonderful World of Christmas	Various Artists	"I Believe in Christmas"			Capitol
1976	The Wonderful World of Christmas, album two	Various Artists	"New Snow on the Roof"			Capitol
1980	Dreamlovers	Tanya Tucker	"Dream Lover" "My Song" duets w/ Tanya Tucker	41		MCA
1980	Any Which Way You Can OST	Various Artists	"Any Which Way You Can	5	141	Viva, Warner Bros.
1981	Echoes of a Century: An American Red Cross Anthology	Various Artists	""The Good Neighbor Is You"; 1975 Red Cross jingle			American Red Cross
1981	Sesame Country	Various Artists	"Keep on Smilin'" duet w/ Oscar the Grouch			CTW
1981	Smokey & The Bandit 2 OST	Various Artists	"Pecos Promenade" duet w/ Tanya Tucker	10		MCA
1981	The Night The Lights Went Out in Georgia OST	Various Artists	"I Love My Truck"	33	94	Mirage
1983	The Golden Seal OST	Various Artists	"Letting Go"			Compleat
1984	New Patches	Mel Tillis	"Slow Nights" duet w/ Mel Tillis	34		MCA
1986	They Come to America	Various Artists	"Another Day in America"			Word
1986	Uphill All the Way OST	Various Artists	"Ghost Riders in the Sky" instrumental w/ Roy Clark "Unlikely Posse" duet w/ Mel Tillis			Radio Records
1987	If There's Any Justice	Lee Greenwood	"If There's Any Justice" duet w/ Lee Greenwood	38		MCA
1988	Water from the Wells of Home	Johnny Cash	"A Croft in Clachan" duet w/ Johnny Cash	48		Mercury
1988	Home for Christmas	A-Strings	"Brightest and Best"			Warner Bros
1990	Lacy J.	Lacy J. Dalton	"Shaky Ground" duet w/ Lacy J. Dalton	26		Capitol
1990	Christmas For The '90s Vol.1	Various Artists	"The Christmas Song"			Capitol Nashville
1990	Christmas For The '90s Vol.2	Various Artists	"Oh Holy Night"			Capitol Nashville
1992	Country Music for Kids	Various Artists	"I Love to Play Outside"	65		Disney
1992	Love Is Strong	Paul Overstreet	"What's Going Without Saying" w/ Paul Overstreet and Susan Ashton	60		Capitol Nashville
1994	Kelly's Heroes	Sandy Kelly	"As We Danced (to the World's Greatest Songs)" duet w/ Sandy Kelly			K-Tel
1995	Stories	Barbara Fairchild	"Jezebel"			Chapel
1995	United We Stand	Debby Campbell	"Medley:" (live) "United We Stand" "Little Green Apples" "Canadian Sunset" "My Elusive Dreams" "United We Stand" (reprise) "Let It Be Me" (live) "All I Have To Do Is Dream" "Silver Threads And Golden Needles" duets w/ Debby Campbell			Branson Theatre Corporation
1995	Platinum & Gold Vol.1	Juice Newton	"Without You" duet w/ Juice Newton			CD Records
1995	Platinum & Gold Vol.2	Juice Newton	"Up Where We Belong" duet w/ Juice Newton			CD Records
1995	Sidewinder	Al Casey	"Route #1" (Al Casey) instrumental w/ Al Casey			Bear Family
1995	Merry Arizona: Desert Stars Shine at Christmas	Various Artists	"Silent Night"			United Cerebral Palsy
1996	NFL Country	Various Artists	"You Never Know Just How Good You've Got It" duet w/ Terry Bradshaw	66		Castle
1997	The Best of Austin City Limits	Various Artists	"Gentle on My Mind" (live); 1984 performance			Columbia Legacy
1997	Lounge-A-Palooza	Various Artists	"Wichita Lineman" w/ Michelle Shocked and Texas Tornados			Hollywood
1997	Merry Arizona 97: Desert Stars Shine at Christmas	Various Artists	"Santa Looked a Lot Like Daddy" duet w/ Buck Owens			United Cerebral Palsy
1999	Duets Vol. 1	Various Artists	"Too Many Secrets" duet w/ Patsy Cline	67		Mercury
1999	Ryman Country Homecoming Vol. 1	Various Artists	"Gentle on My Mind" (live) "Cryin'" (live)	39		Coming Home
1999	Ryman Country Homecoming Vol. 2	Various Artists	"Rhinestone Cowboy" (live)	40		Coming Home
2000	Ryman Country Homecoming Vol. 3	Various Artists	"By the Time I Get to Phoenix" (live)	41		Coming Home
2000	Ralph Emery's Country Homecoming	Various Artists	"Southern Nights" (live)			Coming Home
2000	Country Legends Homecoming	Various Artists	"Dream Baby" (live)			Coming Home
2000	Sharon Sheeley: Songwriter	Various Artists	"Guitar Child" "Blue Ribbons" "Blue Dreams" "Mr. Guitar Man" "The Dream of the Year"; Lead vocal on "Blue Dreams" and "Dream of the Year"			RPM
2001	Ralph Emery and Friends	Various Artists	"It's Only Make Believe" (live) "Wichita Lineman" (live)			Coming Home
2001	All Star Jam	Various Artists	"Highwayman" (live) with Kris Kristofferson "Galveston" (live)			Coming Home
2002	Sounds of B.O.B.	Various Artists	"Take Me Out to the Ball Game"			
2003	Unearthed	Johnny Cash	"Gentle on My Mind" duet w/ Johnny Cash	33		Universal
2003	Livin', Lovin', Losin': Songs of the Louvin Brothers	Various Artists	"When I Stop Dreaming" duet w/ Leslie Satcher			Umvb Labels
2004	Blue Kentucky Girl	Emmylou Harris	"Cheatin' Is" duet w/ Emmylou Harris			Rhino
2005	Bob Wills: Tribute to Bob's 100th Birthday	Various Artists	"I Want to Be Wanted"			Common Ground
2006	Coca-Cola Commercial Songs 1962–1989	Various Artists	"Coming Home"; Coca-Cola jingle			Indie
2006	I've Always Needed You	Emmylou Harris & Carl Jackson	"I've Always Needed You" duet Glen Campbell w/ Gunilla Hutton (c. 1987)			Music Avenue
2007	Boots Too Big to Fill: a Tribute to Gene Autry	Various Artists	"Mexicali Rose"			Rainy Day
2007	The Johnny Cash TV Show 1969–1971	Johnny Cash and others	"Wichita Lineman"			Sony Columbia Legacy
2009	I'll Fly Away Volume One: Songs of Albert E. Brumley	Various Artists	"I'd Rather Be an Old Time Christian" duet w/ Al Brumley Jr.			Table Rock
2009	Later... Live with Jools Holland 2	Various Artists	"Wichita Lineman" (live)			Rhino
2009	Duets	Clay Cooper	"I Love My Truck" duet w/ Clay Cooper			Three C
2010	A Postcard from California	Al Jardine	"A Postcard from California" "California Dreamin'" duets w/ Al Jardine			Jardine Tours
2010	Just across the River	Jimmy Webb	"By the Time I Get to Phoenix" duet w/ Jimmy Webb			E1 Music
2010	Let's Coast AWhile!!	Gene "Bo" Davis	"I've Got Five Dollars And It's Saturday Night"; Gene "Bo" Davis, Faron Young, The Collins Kids, Glen Campbell			Hydra
2011	Grand Ole Opry Classic Collection – Duets	Various Artists	"The Hand That Rocks the Cradle" (live) duet w/ Steve Wariner			Cracker Barrel
2013	True Grit: Music from the Motion Picture	Various Artists	"True Grit" (main title) "True Grit" (alternate) "Go Home Little Girl" "Go Home Little Girl" (revised lyrics) "The Eyes of the Young" "True Grit" (record version)			La-La Land Records
2013	Capitol Vaults: Lost Treasures Volume 1	Various Artists	"Everybody Loves Somebody"			Capitol Catalog MKT
2014	Capitol Vaults: Lost Treasures Volume 2	Various Artists	"Athena" "Thanks to You"			Capitol Catalog MKT
2021	The Lockdown Sessions	Elton John	"I’m Not Gonna Miss You" posthumous duet w/ Elton John		10	EMI Interscope

== Singles ==
=== 1958–1970 ===
Year	Single	Peak chart positions									Certifications	Album
Year	Single	US Country	US	US AC	CAN Country	CAN	CAN AC	IRE	UK	AUS	Certifications	Album
1958	"Dreams for Sale" (with The Glen-Aires)	—	—	—	—	—	—	—	—	—		—N/a
1958	"I Wonder" (with The Glen-Aires)	—	—	—	—	—	—	—	—	—		—N/a
1961	"Winkie Doll" (as Billy Dolton)	—	—	—	—	—	—	—	—	—		—N/a
1961	"Valley of Death"	—	—	—	—	—	—	—	—	—		—N/a
1961	"Turn Around, Look at Me"	—	62	15	—	9	—	—	—	—		—N/a
1961	"Buzz Saw" (as The Gee Cees)	—	—	—	—	—	—	—	—			—N/a
1962	"The Miracle of Love"	—	—	—	—	—	—	—	—	—		—N/a
1962	"Too Late to Worry, Too Blue to Cry"	—	76	—	—	—	—	—	—	—		Too Late to Worry, Too Blue to Cry
1962	"Long Black Limousine"	—	—	—	—	—	—	—	—	—		Too Late to Worry, Too Blue to Cry
1962	"Kentucky Means Paradise" (with the Green River Boys)	20	114	—	—	—	—	—	—	—		Big Bluegrass Special
1963	"Prima Donna"	—	103	—	—	—	—	—	—	—		—N/a
1963	"Dark As a Dungeon" (with the Green River Boys)	—	—	—	—	—	—	—	—	—		—N/a
1963	"Same Old Places"	—	—	—	—	—	—	—	—	—		—N/a
1964	"Through the Eyes of a Child"	—	—	—	—	—	—	—	—	—		—N/a
1964	"Summer, Winter, Spring and Fall"	—	—	—	—	—	—	—	—	—		Burning Bridges
1965	"Tomorrow Never Comes"	—	118	—	—	—	—	—	—	—		Too Late to Worry, Too Blue to Cry
1965	"Guess I'm Dumb"	—	—	—	—	—	—	—	—	—		—N/a
1965	"Universal Soldier"	—	45	—	—	21	—	—	—	16		—N/a
1965	"Private John Q"	—	114	—	—	—	—	—	—	—		—N/a
1966	"Can't You See I'm Trying"	—	—	—	—	—	—	—	—	—		—N/a
1966	"Burning Bridges"	18	—	—	—	—	—	—	—	—		Burning Bridges
1967	"I Gotta Have My Baby Back"	73	—	—	—	—	—	—	—	—		—N/a
1967	"Gentle on My Mind"	30	62	—	—	55	—	—	—	88		Gentle on My Mind
1967	"By the Time I Get to Phoenix"	2	26	12	1	9	—	—	—	—		By the Time I Get to Phoenix
1968	"Hey Little One"	13	54	20	2	31	—	—	—	—		By the Time I Get to Phoenix
1968	"I Wanna Live"	1	36	18	1	18	—	—	—	99		Hey Little One
1968	"Dreams of the Everyday Housewife"	3	32	6	1	25	—	—	—	63		Wichita Lineman
1968	"Gentle on My Mind" (re-release)	44	39	8	20	60	—	—	—	—		Gentle on My Mind
1968	"Wichita Lineman"^{[A]}	1	3	1	1	1	—	12	7	18	RIAA: Gold; BPI: Silver; RMNZ: Gold	Wichita Lineman
1968	"Mornin' Glory" (with Bobbie Gentry)	—	74	32	—	81	—	—	—	—		Bobbie Gentry & Glen Campbell
1968	"St. Louis Blues"	—	—	—	—	—	—	—	—	—		Guitar Gold
1969	"Let It Be Me" (with Bobbie Gentry)	14	36	7	1	85	15	—	—	—		Bobbie Gentry & Glen Campbell
1969	"Galveston"^{[A]}	1	4	1	1	2	1	9	14	7	RIAA: Gold	Galveston
1969	"For the Love of a Woman"	—	—	—	—	—	—	—	—	—		Country Soul
1969	"Where's the Playground Susie"	28	26	10	—	8	3	—	—	17		Galveston
1969	"True Grit"	9	35	7	1	23	4	—	—	47		True Grit
1969	"Try a Little Kindness"	2	23	1	1	5	1	—	45	13		Try a Little Kindness
1970	"Honey Come Back"	2	19	4	1	6	3	2	4	7		Try a Little Kindness
1970	"All I Have to Do Is Dream" (with Bobbie Gentry)	6	27	4	2	29	3	2	3	3		—N/a
1970	"Oh Happy Day"	25	40	7	11	44	—	—	—	73		Oh Happy Day
1970	"Everything a Man Could Ever Need"	5	52	3	1	47	—	—	32	35		Norwood
1970	"It's Only Make Believe"	3	10	2	4	5	—	3	4	2		The Glen Campbell Goodtime Album
"—" denotes releases that did not chart

=== 1971–1980 ===
Year	Single	Peak chart positions										Certifications	Album
Year	Single	US Country	US	CAN Country	CAN	GER	IRE	NED	NZ	UK	AU	Certifications	Album
1971	"Dream Baby (How Long Must I Dream)"	7	31	4	20	—	—	—	—	39	66		The Last Time I Saw Her
1971	"The Last Time I Saw Her"	21	61	21	42	—	—	—	—	—	—		The Last Time I Saw Her
1971	"I Say a Little Prayer / By the Time I Get to Phoenix" (with Anne Murray)	40	81	1	19	—	—	—	—	—	—		Anne Murray / Glen Campbell
1971	"Oklahoma Sunday Morning"	15	104	9	—	—	—	—	—	—	—		—N/a
1971	"Delight Arkansas" (instrumental)	—	—	—	—	—	—	—	—	—	—		—N/a
1972	"Manhattan, Kansas"	6	114	6	—	—	—	—	—	—	90		—N/a
1972	"I Will Never Pass This Way Again"	45	61	54	57	—	—	—	—	—	69		Glen Travis Campbell
1972	"One Last Time"	33	78	17	74	—	—	—	—	—	—		Glen Travis Campbell
1973	"I Knew Jesus (Before He Was a Star)"	48	45	24	52	—	14	—	—	—	18		I Knew Jesus (Before He Was a Star)
1973	"Bring Back My Yesterday"	49	—	61	—	—	—	—	—	—	—		—N/a
1973	"Wherefore and Why"	20	111	30	—	—	—	—	—	—	—		—N/a
1974	"Houston (I'm Comin' to See You)"	20	68	23	54	—	—	—	—	—	—		Houston (I'm Comin' to See You)
1974	"Bonaparte's Retreat"	3	—	1	—	—	—	—	—	—	4		Houston (I'm Comin' to See You)
1974	"It's a Sin When You Love Somebody"	16	—	—	—	—	—	—	—	—	78		Reunion: The Songs of Jimmy Webb
1975	"Rhinestone Cowboy"^{[A]}	1	1	1	1	31	1	3	2	4	5	RIAA: Gold; BPI: Gold; RMNZ: Platinum	Rhinestone Cowboy
1975	"Country Boy (You Got Your Feet in L.A.)"	3	11	1	19	—	—	—	17	—	94		Rhinestone Cowboy
1976	"Don't Pull Your Love / Then You Can Tell Me Goodbye"	4	27	2	51	—	—	—	23	—	65		Bloodline
1976	"See You on Sunday"	18	—	14	87	—	—	—	—	—	—		Bloodline
1977	"Southern Nights"^{[A]}	1	1	2	1	18	3	15	10	28	36	RIAA: Platinum; BPI: Gold; CAN: Gold; RMNZ: Platinum	Southern Nights
1977	"Sunflower"	4	39	7	37	19	—	—	20	—	85		Southern Nights
1977	"God Must Have Blessed America"	39	—	—	—	—	—	—	—	—	—		—N/a
1978	"Another Fine Mess"	21	—	10	—	—	—	—	—	—	—		—N/a
1978	"Can You Fool"	16	38	18	35	—	—	—	—	—	—		Basic
1979	"I'm Gonna Love You"	13	—	8	—	—	—	—	—	—	—		Basic
1979	"California"	45	—	25	—	—	—	—	—	—	—		Basic
1979	"Hound Dog Man"	25	—	11	—	—	—	—	—	—	—		Highwayman
1979	"My Prayer"	66	—	64	—	—	—	—	—	—	—		Highwayman
1980	"Somethin' 'Bout You Baby I Like" (with Rita Coolidge)	60	42	23	—	—	—	—	—	—	—		Somethin' 'Bout You Baby I Like
1980	"Hollywood Smiles"	80	—	—	—	—	—	—	—	—	—		Somethin' 'Bout You Baby I Like
1980	"Any Which Way You Can"	10	—	10	—	—	—	—	—	—	—		Any Which Way You Can soundtrack
"—" denotes releases that did not chart

=== 1981–1990 ===
Year	Single	Peak chart positions				Album
Year	Single	US Country	US	US AC	CAN Country	Album
1981	"I Don't Want to Know Your Name"	54	65	45	—	It's the World Gone Crazy
1981	"Why Don't We Just Sleep on It Tonight" (with Tanya Tucker)	85	—	—	—	It's the World Gone Crazy
1981	"I Love My Truck"	15	94	—	39	The Night the Lights Went Out in Georgia soundtrack
1982	"Old Home Town"	44	—	—	—	Old Home Town
1982	"I Love How You Love Me"	17	—	35	—	Old Home Town
1983	"On the Wings of My Victory"	85	—	—	—	Old Home Town
1983	"Letting Go"	—	—	—	—	The Golden Seal soundtrack
1984	"Faithless Love"	10	—	—	16	Letter to Home
1984	"A Lady Like You"	4	—	—	—	Letter to Home
1985	"(Love Always) Letter to Home"	14	—	—	—	Letter to Home
1985	"No More Night"	—	—	—	—	No More Night
1985	"It's Just a Matter of Time"	7	—	—	7	It's Just a Matter of Time
1986	"Cowpoke"	38	—	—	—	It's Just a Matter of Time
1986	"Call Home"	52	—	—	—	It's Just a Matter of Time
1986	"Another Day in America"	—	—	—	—	They Come to America
1987	"The Hand That Rocks the Cradle" (with Steve Wariner)	6	—	—	6	Still within the Sound of My Voice
1987	"Still Within the Sound of My Voice"	5	—	—	47	Still within the Sound of My Voice
1988	"I Remember You"	32	—	—	56	Still within the Sound of My Voice
1988	"I Have You"	7	—	—	44	Still within the Sound of My Voice
1988	"Light Years"	35	—	—	—	Light Years
1989	"More Than Enough"	47	—	—	—	Light Years
1989	"She's Gone, Gone, Gone"	6	—	—	24	Walkin' in the Sun
1990	"Walkin' in the Sun"	61	—	—	—	Walkin' in the Sun
1990	"On a Good Night"	—	—	—	76	Walkin' in the Sun
1990	"Somebody's Leaving"	—	—	—	—	Walkin' in the Sun
1990	"Unconditional Love"	27	—	—	29	Unconditional Love
"—" denotes releases that did not chart

=== 1991–2024 ===
Year	Single	Peak chart positions							Album
Year	Single	US Country	US	CAN Country	CAN	US Christian			Album
Year	Single	US Country	US	CAN Country	CAN	CHR	AC	INSP	Album
1991	"Living in a House Full of Love"	70	—	83	—	—	—	—	Unconditional Love
1991	"The Greatest Gift of All" (with Russ Taff)	—	—	—	—	22	6	2	Show Me Your Way
1991	"Right Down to the Memories"	—	—	—	—	—	—	—	Unconditional Love
1992	"Jesus and Me"	—	—	—	—	—	10	3	Show Me Your Way
1992	"Where I Am Going"	—	—	—	—	—	8	4	Show Me Your Way
1992	"The Eyes of Innocence"	—	—	—	—	—	25	—	Wings of Victory
1992	"Somebody Like That"	66	—	78	—	—	—	—	Somebody Like That
1993	"Searching Love"	—	—	—	—	—	13	6	Wings of Victory
1993	"I Will Arise"	—	—	—	—	—	—	14	Wings of Victory
1994	"The Best Is Yet to Come"	—	—	—	—	—	18	24	The Boy in Me
1994	"The Boy in Me"	—	—	—	—	—	29	17	The Boy in Me
1994	"Mansion in Branson"	—	—	—	—	—	—	—	Glen Campbell Live! His Greatest Hits
1995	"Come Harvest Time"	—	—	—	—	—	—	13	The Boy in Me
1995	"Living the Legacy"	—	—	—	—	—	—	—	The Boy in Me
1995	"No More Night"	—	—	—	—	—	—	—	Silent Witness soundtrack
1997	"Call It Even"	—	—	—	—	—	—	—	Jesus and Me: The Collection
2014	"I'm Not Gonna Miss You"	21	90	—	66	—	—	—	I'll Be Me soundtrack
2017	"Adios"	—	—	—	—	—	—	—	Adios
2024	"Nothing But the Whole Wide World" (with Eric Clapton)	—	—	—	—	—	—	—	Duets – Ghost on the Canvas Sessions
"—" denotes releases that did not chart

Notes

- A Singles certified Gold by the RIAA.

== Other singles ==
=== Guest singles ===
Year	Single	Artist	Peak chart positions		Album
Year	Single	Artist	US Country	CAN Country	Album
1980	"Pecos Promenade"	Tanya Tucker	10	—	Smokey and the Bandit II (Soundtrack album)
1980	"Dream Lover"	Tanya Tucker	59	48	Dreamlovers
1984	"Slow Nights"	Mel Tillis	47	—	New Patches
1985	"Hear Your Heart"	The Faan Band	—	—	—N/a
2017	"This Land Is Your Land"	Uncommon Folk featuring Glen Campbell	—	—	—N/a
"—" denotes releases that did not chart

=== Christmas singles ===
Year	Single	Peak positions	Album
Year	Single	US Christmas	Album
1968	"Christmas Is for Children"	7	That Christmas Feeling

=== Non-U.S. singles ===
Year	Single	Peak positions	Album	Released in
Year	Single	UK	Album	Released in
1969	"Temple De Acero"	—	—N/a	Latin America
1975	"Coming Home"	—	—N/a	Japan
1981	"If You Were My Lady" (with Diane Solomon)	—	—N/a	UK, Brazil
1982	"Nothing Hurts Like You Do"	—	—N/a	The Netherlands
1984	"They Still Dance to Waltzes in England"	—	—N/a	UK
2002	"Rhinestone Cowboy (Giddy Up Giddy Up)" (Rikki & Daz featuring Glen Campbell)	12	—N/a	Europe, Australia
2008	"Good Riddance (Time of Your Life)"	137	Meet Glen Campbell	Europe
2008	"Times Like These"	—	Meet Glen Campbell	Europe
2008	"Grow Old with Me"	—	Meet Glen Campbell	Europe
2011	"Ghost on the Canvas"	—	Ghost on the Canvas	Europe
"—" denotes releases that did not chart

== B-sides ==
=== 1958–1990 ===
Year	B-side	Peak positions	A-side
Year	B-side	US Country	A-side
1958	"I've Got to Win"	—	"Dreams for Sale"
1958	"You You You"	—	"I Wonder"
1961	"Girls"	—	"Winkie Doll"
1961	"Nothin' Better Than a Pretty Woman"	—	"Valley of Death" (a.k.a. Death Valley)
1961	"Brenda"	—	"Turn Around Look at Me"
1961	"Annie Had a Party"	—	"Buzz Saw"
1962	"Once More"	—	"The Miracle of Love"
1963	"Divorce Me COD"	—	"Dark As a Dungeon"
1964	"Let Me Tell You 'Bout Mary"	—	"Through the Eyes of a Child"
1964	"Heartaches Can Be Fun"	—	"Summer, Winter, Spring and Fall"
1965	"Woman's World"	—	"Tomorrow Never Comes"
1965	"That's All Right"	—	"Guess I'm Dumb"
1966	"A Satisfied Mind"	—	"Can't You See I'm Trying"
1966	"Only the Lonely"	—	"Burning Bridges"
1968	"Kelli Hoedown"	—	"Dreams of the Everyday Housewife"
1968	"Tender"	—	"St. Louis Blues"
1968	"Less of Me"	44	"Mornin' Glory"
1969	"Smokey Blue Eyes"	—	"For the Love of a Woman"
1969	"Arkansas"	—	"Where' the Playground Susie"
1969	"Lonely My Lonely Friend"	—	"Try a Little Kindness"
1971	"Here and Now"	—	"Dream Baby (How Long Must I Dream)"
1971	"All through the Night" with Anne Murray	—	"I Say a Little Prayer / By the Time I Get to Phoenix"
1971	"Everybody's Got to Go There Sometime"	—	"Oklahoma Sunday Morning"
1972	"We All Pull the Load"	—	"I Will Never Pass This Way Again"
1975	"Record Collector's Dream"	—	"Country Boy (You Got Your Feet in L.A.)"
1977	"William Tell Overture"	—	"Southern Nights"
1982	"Heartache #3"	—	"Old Hometown"
1985	"Hear Your Heart" (Instrumental)	—	"Hear Your Heart"
"—" denotes releases that did not chart

=== 1991–1997 ===
Year	B-side	Peak chart positions		A-side
Year	B-side	US Christian		A-side
Year	B-side	AC	INSP	A-side
1991	"The Wayward Son"	8	—	"The Greatest Gift of All"
1992	"Only One Life"	—	21	"The Eyes of Innocence"
"—" denotes releases that did not chart

=== Non-U.S. B-sides ===
Year	B-side	A-side	Released in
1970	"Walk Right Back"	"All I Have to Do Is Dream"	Europe, Japan
1975	"Dream Baby (How Long Must I Dream)" (Japanese lyrics)	"Houston (I'm Comin' to See You)"	Japan
1981	"It's One to Grow On"	"If You Were My Lady"	UK, Brazil
1982	"Believe It Or Not"	"Nothing Hurts Like You Do"	The Netherlands
