= The Glen Campbell Collection (1962–1989) Gentle on My Mind =

The Glen Campbell Collection (1962–1989)

Compilation album by Glen Campbell
- Released: February 1997
- Genre: Country
- Label: Razor & Tie

Professional ratings
Review scores
Source	Rating
Allmusic	link
No Depression	link

The Glen Campbell Collection (1962–1989) Gentle on My Mind is a double CD containing 38 of the 74 singles released by Glen Campbell that charted on the Billboard Country Singles chart. "William Tell Overture" has been recorded more than once by Campbell but the version included here is a previously unreleased recording. "Bloodline" is an album track from the 1976 "Bloodline" album.

== Track listing ==
Disc One

1. "Kentucky Means Paradise" (with The Green River Boys) (Merle Travis)
2. "Gentle On My Mind" (John Hartford)
3. "Burning Bridges" (Walter Scott)
4. "By The Time I Get To Phoenix" (Jimmy Webb)
5. "I Wanna Live" (John D. Loudermilk)
6. "Dreams of the Everyday Housewife" (Chris Gantry)
7. "Wichita Lineman" (Jimmy Webb)
8. "Let It Be Me" (with Bobbie Gentry) (Gilbert Bécaud / Pierre Delanoé / Mann Curtis)
9. "Galveston" (Jimmy Webb)
10. "Where's The Playground Susie" (Jimmy Webb)
11. "True Grit" (Elmer Bernstein/Don Black)
12. "Try A Little Kindness" (Bobby Austin / Curt Sapaugh)
13. "Honey, Come Back" (Jimmy Webb)
14. "All I Have To Do Is Dream" (with Bobbie Gentry) (Boudleaux Bryant)
15. "Oh Happy Day" (Edwin Hawkins)
16. "Everything A Man Could Ever Need" (Mac Davis)
17. "It's Only Make Believe" (Conway Twitty/Jack Nance)
18. "Dream Baby (How Long Must I Dream) (Cindy Walker)
19. "The Last Time I Saw Her" (Gordon Lightfoot)
20. "William Tell Overture" (G. Rossini)

Disc Two

1. "Bonaparte's Retreat" (Pee Wee King)
2. "I Knew Jesus (Before He was A Star) (Neil Hefti / Stanley Styne)
3. "Houston (I'm Comin' to See You)" (David Paich)
4. "Manhattan, Kansas" (Joe Allen)
5. "Rhinestone Cowboy" (Larry Weiss)
6. "Country Boy (You Got Your Feet in L.A.)" (Dennis Lambert / Brian Potter)
7. "Don't Pull Your Love/Then You Can Tell Me Goodbye" (Dennis Lambert / Brian Potter / John D. Loudermilk)
8. "See You On Sunday" (Dennis Lambert / Brian Potter)
9. "Southern Nights" (Allen Toussaint)
10. "Sunflower" (Neil Diamond)
11. "Can You Fool" (Michael Smotherman)
12. "Any Which Way You Can" (Milton Brown/Steve Doriff/Snuff Garrett)
13. "I'm Gonna Love You" (Michael Smotherman)
14. "Bloodline" (Stephen Geyer)
15. "Faithless Love" (JD Souther)
16. "A Lady Like You" (Jim Weatherly/Keith Stegall)
17. "The Hand That Rocks The Cradle" (with Steve Wariner) (Ted Harris)
18. "Still Within The Sound Of My Voice" (Jimmy Webb)
19. "I Have You" (Gene Nelson/Paul Nelson)
20. "She's Gone, Gone, Gone" (Harlen Howard)

== Production ==
- Producer - Mike Ragogna
- Liner notes - Colin Escott
- Art direction/design - Murray Brenman
- Project coordinator - David Richman
- Photos - EMI-Capitol Special Markets
- Mastered by Elliott Federman/DSW Mastering Studios, New York
