= Tomorrow Never Comes (song) =

1945 country song by Ernest Tubb

"Tomorrow Never Comes" is a 1945 song by Ernest Tubb, composed by Tubb with lyrics by Johnny Bond. The song was recorded at least three times by Glen Campbell.

== Cover versions ==
- B. J. Thomas in 1965 (US No. 80 & Canada No. 89)
- Glen Campbell in 1965
- Brian Poole in 1967
- Slim Whitman in 1970
- Elvis Presley in 1970
- Jim Nabors in 1970
- George Jones in 1974
- Charles Mann

=== Other albums and compilations ===
- The Ernest Tubb Story by Ernest Tubb in 1959
  - The Definitive Collection
- Too Late to Worry – Too Blue to Cry by Glen Campbell in 1963
- By the Time I Get to Phoenix by Glen Campbell in 1967
- Gentle on My Mind by Glen Campbell in 1972
  - Classic Campbell via EMI in 2006
  - The Essential Glen Campbell Volume Three
  - The Legacy (1961–2002) by Glen Campbell in 2003
  - Glen Campbell Collection
  - Limited Collector's Edition
- A Picture of Me (Without You) by George Jones in 1972
- Country and West by Dottie West in 1970
- Country Roads by the Osborne Brothers in 1971
- Elvis Country (I'm 10,000 Years Old) by Elvis Presley
  - Walk a Mile in My Shoes: The Essential '70s Masters by Elvis Presley
- The World of Lynn Anderson by Lynn Anderson in 1971.
- Don't Come Home a Drinkin' (With Lovin' on Your Mind) by Loretta Lynn in 1967
- Marco T. Una Sesion Country by Marco T. in 2001

== See also ==
- Ernest Tubb discography
