= The Capitol Years 65/77 =

Compilation album by Glen Campbell
- Released: February 22, 1999
- Recorded: 1965–1977
- Genre: Country, country pop
- Length: 124:33
- Label: Zonophone/Capitol EMI
- Producer: Brian Ahern; Jimmy Bowen; Glen Campbell; Al De Lory; Steve Douglas; Kelly Gordon; Gary Klein; Dennis Lambert; Neely Plumb; Brian Potter; Nick Venet

Glen Campbell chronology
The Glen Campbell Collection (1962–1989) Gentle on My Mind (1997)	The Capitol Years 65/77 (1999)	Reunited with Jimmy Webb 1974–1988 (1999)

Professional ratings
Review scores
Source	Rating
AllMusic	5/5 stars

The Capitol Years 65/77 is a compilation album by Glen Campbell, released on February 22, 1999, only in Europe. The double CD set contains previously released, single and album tracks that Campbell recorded for Capitol Records between 1965 and 1977.

AllMusic reviewer Bruce Eder awarded the compilation 5-out-of-5 stars, and stated "There is no definitive Glen Campbell compilation, but this 130-minute, two-disc set from England comes very close to it."

== Track listing ==
Disc 1:

1. "The Universal Soldier" (Buffy Saint Marie) - 2:10
2. "Guess I'm Dumb" (Brian Wilson, Russ Titelman) - 2:40
3. "Less of Me" (Glen Campbell) - 2:36
4. "Mary in the Morning" (Lendell, Cymbal) - 3:03
5. "Gentle on My Mind" (John Hartford) - 2:57
6. "By the Time I Get to Phoenix" (Jimmy Webb) - 2:43
7. "They'll Never Take Her Love Away From Me" (Leon Payne) - 2:21
8. "Hey Little One" (Dorsey Burnette, Barry De Vorzon) - 2:33
9. "Just Another Man" (Campbell, Allison) - 2:11
10. "It's Over" (Jimmie Rodgers) - 2:04
11. "Without Her" (Harry Nilsson) - 2:16
12. "Dreams of the Everyday Housewife" (Chris Gantry) - 2:34
13. "Wichita Lineman" (Jimmy Webb) - 3:06
14. "You're Young and You'll Forget" (Jerry Hubbard) - 2:19
15. "Every Time I Itch I Wind Up Scratching You" (Campbell, Slate) - 1:53
16. "Reason to Believe" (Tim Hardin) - 2:24
17. "Galveston" (Jimmy Webb) - 2:40
18. "Where's the Playground Susie" (Jimmy Webb) - 2:56
19. "Got to Have Tenderness" (M. Torok, R. Redd) - 2:10
20. "Mornin' Glory" (with Bobbie Gentry) - (Bobbie Gentry) - 2:53
21. "True Grit" (Don Black, Elmer Bernstein) - 2:32
22. "If This Is Love" (Campbell, Ezell) - 2:09
23. "Try a Little Kindness" (Austin, Sapaugh) - 2:26
24. "All I Have to Do Is Dream" (with Bobbie Gentry) (Bryant) - 2:33

Disc 2:

1. "Honey Come Back" (Jimmy Webb) - 2:58
2. "Folk Singer" (Daniels) - 2:45
3. "Love Is Not a Game" (Goldstein, James) - 2:13
4. "Everything a Man Could Ever Need" (Mac Davis) - 2:32
5. "As Far as I'm Concerned" (Bobby Russell) - 2:40
6. "It's Only Make Believe" (Conway Twitty, Jack Nance) - 2:27
7. "Dream Sweet Dreams About Me" (Ragsdale) - 2:39
8. "Just Another Piece of Paper" (Jimmy Webb) - 2:10
9. "The Last Time I Saw Her" (Gordon Lightfoot) - 4:07
10. "Don't It Make You Want to Go Home" (Joe South) - 2:32
11. "London (I'm Comin' to See You)" (David Paich) - 3:21
12. "You Might as Well Smile" (Jimmy Webb) - 3:31
13. "About the Ocean" (Susan Webb) - 2:57
14. "Adoration" (Jimmy Webb) - 3:12
15. "Rhinestone Cowboy" (Larry Weiss) - 3:15
16. "Country Boy (You Got Your Feet in L.A.)" (Dennis Lambert, Brian Potter) - 3:07
17. "Marie" (Randy Newman) - 3:35
18. "Comeback" (Lambert, Potter) - 3:24
19. "Christiaan No" (Jimmy Webb) - 2:34
20. "Southern Nights" (Allen Toussaint) - 2:58
21. "Sunflower" (Neil Diamond) - 2:52
22. "This Is Sarah's Song" (Jimmy Webb) - 2:35

== Production ==
- Compiled by Bob Stanley, Pete Wiggs
- Biography - Patrick Gilbert
- Design - Phantom Industries
