= The Very Best of Glen Campbell =

Greatest hits album by Glen Campbell
- Released: 1987
- Genre: Country
- Length: 41:45
- Label: Capitol
- Producers: Al De Lory, Jimmy Bowen, Dennis Lambert, Brian Potter

Professional ratings
Review scores
| Source | Rating |
|---|---|
| Allmusic | 4.5/5 stars |

The compilation album The Very Best of Glen Campbell can be regarded as the CD release of the 1976 album The Best of Glen Campbell. The track listing however is quite different.

== Track listing ==
1. "Rhinestone Cowboy" (Larry Weiss) - 3:14
2. "Wichita Lineman" (Jimmy Webb) - 306
3. "Galveston" (Jimmy Webb) - 2:41
4. "By the Time I Get to Phoenix" (Jimmy Webb) - 2:44
5. "Try a Little Kindness" (Curt Sapaugh, Bobby Austin) - 2:26
6. "Hey Little One" (Dorsey Burnette, Barry De Vorzon) - 2:33
7. "Where's The Playground Susie" (Jimmy Webb) - 2:56
8. "Gentle on My Mind" (John Hartford) - 2:58
9. "Dreams of the Everyday Housewife" (Chris Gantry) - 2:35
10. "All I Have to Do Is Dream" (with Bobbie Gentry) (Boudleaux Bryant)- 2:36
11. "Dream Baby (How Long Must I Dream)" (Cindy Walker) - 2:32
12. "It's Only Make Believe" (Conway Twitty, Jack Nance) - 2:18
13. "Sunflower" (Neil Diamond) - 2:51
14. "Southern Nights" (Allen Toussaint) - 2:59
15. "Country Boy (You Got Your Feet in L.A.)" (Dennis Lambert, Brian Potter) - 3:07

== Production ==
- Producers - Al De Lory, Jimmy Bowen, Dennis Lambert, Brian Potter
- Art direction - Roy Kohara
- Photography - Kenny Rogers
