= The Essential Glen Campbell Volume One =

Compilation album by Glen Campbell
- Released: 1994
- Genre: Country
- Length: 65:23
- Label: Capitol; CDP-33288

The Essential Glen Campbell Volume One is the first of a series of three albums which cover Glen Campbell's recordings for Capitol Records between 1962 and 1979. The tracks are presented in a non-chronological order. All three Essential CDs contain, next to single and albums tracks, previously unreleased recordings. On The Essential Glen Campbell Volume One, these are "Twelve Blues", "I Walk the Line" (a jazz version of the Johnny Cash hit) and "Blue Sky Shining", from a 1979 recording session led by Nelson Riddle. The Essential albums are also notable for containing some of the songs from The Artistry of Glen Campbell, the only original studio album by Glen Campbell that has not been released on CD or as a digital download. Included here are "Banjo Garden" and "Shenandoah".

Professional ratings
Review scores
Source	Rating
Allmusic	link

== Track listing ==
1. "Kentucky Means Paradise" (Merle Travis) - 1:41
2. "I'll Hold You in My Heart" (Eddy Arnold, Hal Horton, Tommy Dilbeck) - 2:50
3. "Twelve Blues" (Glen Campbell) - 2:45
4. "Burning Bridges" (Walter Scott) - 2:30
5. "Mary in the Morning" (Michael Lendell, Johnny Cymbal) - 3:03
6. "I Walk the Line" (John R. Cash) - 2:18
7. "Dreams of the Everyday Housewife" (Chris Gantry) - 2:34
8. "Sittin' on the Dock of the Bay" (Steve Cropper, Otis Redding) - 2:34
9. "Let It Be Me" (Gilbert Bécaud, Pierre Delanoë, Mann Curtis) - 2:04
10. "Galveston" (Jimmy Webb) - 2:40
11. "Banjo Garden (Travis Kelly) - 1:59
12. "True Grit" (Don Black, Elmer Bernstein) - 2:31
13. "It's Only Make Believe" (Conway Twitty, Jack Nance) - 2:26
14. "I Say a Little Prayer/By the Time I Get to Phoenix" (Burt Bacharach, Hal David/Jimmy Webb) - 3:12
15. "Last Time I Saw Her" (Gordon Lightfoot) - 4:05
16. "Shenandoah" (Traditional) - 2:52
17. "I Knew Jesus (Before He Was a Star)" (Neal Hefti, Stanley Styne) - 2:52
18. "Country Boy (You Got Your Feet in LA)" (Dennis Lambert, Brian Potter) - 3:07
19. "My Way" (Paul Anka, Jacques Revaux, Claude François, Gilles Thibault) - 4:34
20. "Bloodline" (Stephen Geyer) - 4:32
21. "Sunflower" (Neil Diamond) - 2:50
22. "Classical Gas" (Mason Williams) - 3:15
23. "Blue Sky Shining'" (Mickey Newbury) - 3:09

== Production ==
- Producers - Nick Venet, Steve Douglas, Al De Lory, Kelly Gordon, Jimmy Bowen, Dennis Lambert, Brian Potter, Gary Klein, Glen Campbell, Tom Thacker
- Art direction - Sherri Halford, Mickey Braithwaite
- Design - Mickey Braithwaite
- Photography - Capitol Records archives
- Liner notes - Patsi Cox
- Compiled by John Johnson
- Remastered by Glenn Meadows/Masterfonics, Nashville, TN
