= Gentle on My Mind (disambiguation) =

"Gentle on My Mind" is a 1967 song written by John Hartford and covered by Glen Campbell, Elvis Presley and many others.

Gentle on My Mind may also refer to:

- Gentle on My Mind (1967 Glen Campbell album)
- Gentle on My Mind (1972 Glen Campbell album)
- Gentle on My Mind (Patti Page album), 1968
- Gentle on My Mind (Dean Martin album), 1968
