= Greatest Hits (Glen Campbell album) =

Greatest hits album by Glen Campbell
- Released: February 10, 2009
- Genre: Country
- Label: Capitol
- Producer: Al De Lory, Elmer Bernstein, Dennis Lambert, Brian Potter, Gary Klein, Glen Campbell

Professional ratings
Review scores
Source	Rating
Allmusic	4/5 stars

Greatest Hits contains remixes of Glen Campbell's biggest hits. The songs are remixed using purely the original recordings, bringing out other nuances in the arrangements. The last two tracks on this compilation, "Times Like These" and "These Days", were pulled off Campbell's recent studio album Meet Glen Campbell.

== Track listing ==
1. "Rhinestone Cowboy" (Larry Weiss) - 3:29
2. "Wichita Lineman" (Jimmy Webb) - 3:10
3. "Southern Nights" (Allen Toussaint) - 2:59
4. "By The Time I Get To Phoenix" (Jimmy Webb) - 2:51
5. "Galveston" (Jimmy Webb) - 2:47
6. "Try A Little Kindness" (Curt Sapaugh, Bobby Austin) - 2:27
7. "Gentle On My Mind" (John Hartford) - 2:56
8. "I Wanna Live" (John D. Loudermilk) - 2:47
9. "Country Boy (You Got Your Feet in L.A.)" (Dennis Lambert, Brian Potter) - 3:06
10. "True Grit" (Don Black, Elmer Bernstein) - 2:31
11. "Honey Come Back" (Jimmy Webb) - 3:01
12. "It's Only Make Believe" (Conway Twitty, Jack Nance) -2:25
13. "Dreams of the Everyday Housewife" (Chris Gantry) - 2:33
14. "Hey Little One" (Dorsey Burnette, Barry De Vorzon) - 2:34
15. "Times Like These" (David Grohl, Taylor Hawkins, Nate Mendel, Chris Shiflett) - 3:27
16. "These Days" (Jackson Browne) - 3:28

== Production ==
- Original recordings produced by Al De Lory, Elmer Bernstein, Dennis Lambert, Brian Potter, Gary Klein, Glen Campbell
- Tracks 15 and 16 produced by Julian Raymond, Howard Willing
- Tracks 1, 2, 4, 5, 7, 15 and 16 mixed by Howard Willing, Julian Raymond at The Record Company
- All other tracks mixed by Howard Willing at The Record Company
- Project supervision- Matt D'Amico and Sam Nelson
- Mastering - Brian Gardner/Bernie Grundman Mastering
- Art Direction- Tom Recchion
- Design - Greg Ross/Orabor
- Photography - Capitol Records Archives

== Chart performance ==
Chart (2010)	Peak position
U.S. Billboard Top Country Albums	63

== Certifications ==
Certifications for Greatest Hits
Region	Certification	Certified units/sales
United Kingdom (BPI)	Gold	100,000^{‡}
^{‡} Sales+streaming figures based on certification alone.
