= Rhinestone Cowboy (disambiguation) =

"Rhinestone Cowboy" is a 1975 Glen Campbell song.

Rhinestone Cowboy may also refer to:

- Rhinestone Cowboy (album), 1975 Glen Campbell album
  - Rhinestone Cowboy (New Studio Recordings), 2004
  - Rhinestone Cowboy/Bloodline The Lambert & Potter Sessions 1975–1976
  - Rhinestone Cowboy Live, on the Air & in the Studio, 2005
- "Rhinestone Cowboy", a song by Madvillain from the 2004 album Madvillainy
- Rhinestone Cowboy (horse) (fl. 2002–2007), a race horse

== See also ==
- Loy Allen Bowlin (1909–1995), also known as The Original Rhinestone Cowboy, an outsider artist
- The Mysterious Rhinestone Cowboy, a 1974 album by David Allan Coe
- Rhinestone, a 1984 comedy starring Sylvester Stallone and Dolly Parton
