= All the Best (Glen Campbell album) =

Greatest hits album by Glen Campbell
- Released: January 28, 2003
- Genre: Country
- Label: Capitol

Professional ratings
Review scores
Source	Rating
Allmusic	5/5 stars

All the Best contains the majority of Glen Campbell's recordings that reached the Top 40 of the Billboard Hot 100. It was his best charting album since Southern Nights (1977).

== Track listing ==
1. "Rhinestone Cowboy" — (Larry Weiss) - 3:15
2. "Galveston" — (Jimmy Webb) - 2:42
3. "Wichita Lineman" — (Jimmy Webb) - 3:07
4. "By the Time I Get to Phoenix" — (Jimmy Webb) - 2:44
5. "Gentle on My Mind" — (John Hartford) - 2:58
6. "Southern Nights" — (Allen Toussaint) - 2:58
7. "Country Boy (You Got Your Feet in L.A.)" — (Dennis Lambert, Brian Potter) - 3:09
8. "Dreams of the Everyday Housewife" — (Chris Gantry) - 2:35
9. "It's Only Make Believe" — (Conway Twitty, Jack Nance) - 2:27
10. "I Wanna Live" — (John D. Loudermilk) - 2:44
11. "Try a Little Kindness" — (Bobby Austin, Curt Sapaugh) - 2:25
12. "Sunflower" — (Neil Diamond) - 2:51
13. "Dream Baby (How Long Must I Dream)" — (Cindy Walker) - 2:32
14. "Honey, Come Back" — (Jimmy Webb) - 3:01
15. "Let It Be Me" — (with Bobbie Gentry) (Gilbert Bécaud, Pierre Delanoë, Manny Curtis) - 2:05
16. "True Grit" — (Elmer Bernstein, Don Black) - 2:32
17. "Houston (I'm Comin' To See You)" — (David Paich) - 3:20
18. "Don't Pull Your Love/Then You Can Tell Me Goodbye" — (Lambert, Potter / Loudermilk) - 3:22
19. "Highwayman" — (Jimmy Webb) - 3:04
20. "I'm Gonna Love You" — (Michael Smotherman) - 3:26
21. "Where's The Playground Susie" — (Jimmy Webb) - 2:56
22. "All I Have to Do Is Dream" — (with Bobbie Gentry) (Boudleaux Bryant) - 2:36
23. "Hey Little One" — (Dorsey Burnette, Barry De Vorzon) - 2:33
24. "The Last Time I Saw Her" — (Gordon Lightfoot) - 4:06
25. "Everything a Man Could Ever Need" — (Mac Davis) - 2:32

== Production ==
- Executive producer - Mark Copeland
- Compiled by Kevin Flaherty
- Liner notes - Valerie V. Hansen
- Art direction - Michelle Azzopardi
- Photography - Jeff Ross
- Mastered by Bob Norberg/Capitol Mastering, Hollywood, CA

== Charts ==
Album - Billboard (United States)

Chart	Entry date	Peak position	No. of weeks
Billboard 200	02/15/2003	89	?
Billboard Country Albums	02/15/2003	12	15
