= Glen Campbell Live (1981 album) =

Live album by Glen Campbell
- Released: November 1981
- Recorded: May 8, 1981
- Venue: Cornwall Coliseum, Carlyon Bay, St. Austell, UK
- Studio: The Manor Mobile
- Genre: Country
- Label: RCA/Energy
- Producer: Howard Kruger

Glen Campbell chronology
It's the World Gone Crazy (1981)	Glen Campbell Live (1981)	Old Home Town (1982)

Glen Campbell Live is the fourth live album by American musician Glen Campbell, a UK only release from November 1981. It has been re-released in various formats and under various titles since, including Glen Campbell Presents His Hits in Concert in 1990.

== Track listing ==
Side 1:

1. "Rhinestone Cowboy" (Larry Weiss) – 3:15
2. "Gentle on My Mind" (John Hartford) – 2:06
3. "Medley" – 4:29
  1. "Wichita Lineman" (Jimmy Webb)
  2. "Galveston" (Jimmy Webb)
  3. "Country Boy (You Got Your Feet in L.A.)" (Dennis Lambert, Brian Potter)
4. "By the Time I Get to Phoenix" (Jimmy Webb) – 2:45
5. "Dreams of the Everyday Housewife" (Chris Gantry) – 2:12
6. "Heartache Number Three" (Steve Hardin) – 2:56
7. "Please Come to Boston" (Dave Loggins) – 3:42

Side 2:

1. "Trials and Tribulations" (Michael Smotherman) – 3:22
2. "It's Only Make Believe" (Conway Twitty, Jack Nance) – 2:39
3. "Crying" (Roy Orbison, Joe Melson) – 3:35
4. "Bluegrass Medley" – 5:15
  1. "Foggy Mountain Breakdown" (Earl Scruggs)
  2. "Orange Blossom Special" (Ervin T. Rouse)
5. "Milk Cow Blues" (Kokomo Arnold) – 5:18

Side 3:

1. "Rollin' (In My Sweet Baby's Arms)" (J. Clement) – 3:35
2. "I'm So Lonesome I Could Cry" (Hank Williams) – 3:27
3. "Southern Nights" (Allen Toussaint) – 3:59
4. "Amazing Grace" (John Newton) – 4:31

Side 4:

1. "Try a Little Kindness" (Curt Sapaugh, Bobby Austin) – 2:36
2. "Loving Arms" (Tom Jans)" – 3:31
3. "It's Your World" (Steve Hardin) – 4:20
4. "Mull of Kintyre" (Paul McCartney, Denny Laine) – 6:12

Source for track listing:

== Personnel ==
- Glen Campbell – vocals, acoustic guitar, electric guitar, bagpipes
- Kim Darrigan – bass guitar, bass fiddle
- Craig Fall – acoustic guitar, electric guitar, keyboards
- Steve Hardin – vocals, harmonica, keyboards
- Carl Jackson – vocals, banjo, acoustic guitar, electric guitar, fiddle
- T.J. Kuenster – background vocals, piano
- Steve Turner – drums

Source for personnel:

== Production ==
- Producer – Howard Kruger
- Engineer – Bill "The Scott" Irving
- Recorded by The Manor Mobile
- Concert sound by E.S.E. Ltd.
- Lightning by Zenith Lightning
- Mixed at the Manor, Oxford and The Town House, London
- Recorded and mixed by Howard Kruger for Energetic Enterprises Ltd.
- Album designed by Nigel Goodall
- Photographs courtesy of R.T.E. Television, Ireland and Keith Toogood

Source for production:

== Reception ==
Bruce Eder from AllMusic gave the album 4 out of 5 stars, saying that "this is a highly polished concert recording if not the most exciting ever heard, with Campbell getting ample room not only to work out his very attractive singing but also give a vivid display of his talents on the electric and acoustic guitar."
