= 1968 Country Music Association Awards =

Music awards ceremony in Nashville, US

- Date: November 20, 1968
- Location: Ryman Auditorium, Nashville, Tennessee
- Hosted by: Dale Evans; Roy Rogers
- Most wins: Glen Campbell (2)
- Most nominations: Glen Campbell (6)

Television/radio coverage
- Network: NBC

The 1968 Country Music Association Awards, 2nd Ceremony, was held on November 20, 1968, at the Ryman Auditorium, Nashville, Tennessee, and was hosted by Dale Evans and Roy Rogers.

== Winners and nominees ==
Winners in Bold.

Entertainer of the Year	Album of the Year
**Glen Campbell**; Eddy Arnold; Johnny Cash; Merle Haggard; Charley Pride	**At Folsom Prison — Johnny Cash**; By the Time I Get to Phoenix — Glen Campbell; D-I-V-O-R-C-E — Tammy Wynette; Gentle on My Mind — Glen Campbell; The Best of Merle Haggard — Merle Haggard
Male Vocalist of the Year	Female Vocalist of the Year
**Glen Campbell**; Eddy Arnold; Johnny Cash; Merle Haggard; Charley Pride	**Tammy Wynette**; Lynn Anderson; Loretta Lynn; Dolly Parton; Jeannie C. Riley
Vocal Group of the Year	Comedian of the Year
**Porter Wagoner and Dolly Parton**; Bill Anderson and Jan Howard; Archie Campbell and Lorene Mann; Johnny Cash and June Carter Cash; The Stoneman Family	**Ben Colder**; Don Bowman; Archie Campbell; Homer & Jethro; Minnie Pearl
Single of the Year	Song of the Year
**"Harper Valley PTA" — Jeannie C. Riley**; "By the Time I Get to Phoenix" — Glen Campbell; "D-I-V-O-R-C-E" — Tammy Wynette; "Folsom Prison Blues" — Johnny Cash; "Honey" — Bobby Goldsboro	**"Honey" — Bobby Russell**; "D-I-V-O-R-C-E" — Bobby Braddock, Curly Putman; "Harper Valley PTA" — Tom T. Hall; "Little Green Apples" — Bobby Russell; "Skip a Rope" — Jack Moran, Glenn Douglas Tubb
Instrumental Group of the Year	Instrumentalist of the Year
**The Buckaroos**; Po' Boys; The Stoneman Family; Texas Troubadours; Wagon Masters	**Chet Atkins**; Glen Campbell; Roy Clark; Floyd Cramer; Boots Randolph

== Hall of Fame ==
Country Music Hall of Fame Inductees
- Bob Wills
