= Classics Collection (Glen Campbell album) =

Compilation album by Glen Campbell
- Released: 1990
- Genre: Country
- Label: Liberty

Professional ratings
Review scores
Source	Rating
Allmusic	link

Classics Collection was a Capitol Nashville compilation series, one issue of which contains a selection of Glen Campbell's hits from the sixties and seventies.

== Track listing ==
1. "Galveston" (Jimmy Webb) - 2:40
2. "Gentle On My Mind" (John Hartford) - 2:58
3. "Wichita Lineman" (Jimmy Webb) - 3:06
4. "Dreams of the Everyday Housewife" (Chris Gantry) - 2:35
5. "Hey Little One" (Dorsey Burnette, Barry De Vorzon) - 2:32
6. "By The Time I Get To Phoenix" (Jimmy Webb) - 2:43
7. "Rhinestone Cowboy" (Larry Weiss) - 3:15
8. "Southern Nights" (Allen Toussaint) - 2:59
9. "Bonaparte's Retreat" (King, Stewart) - 2:49
10. "Country Boy (You Got Your Feet In L. A.) (Dennis Lambert, Brian Potter) - 3:09

== Production ==
- Producers - Al De Lory, Dennis Lambert & Brian Potter, Gary Klein, Jimmy Bowen
- Art direction - Virginia Team
- Design - Jerry Joyner
- Photography - Beverly Parker
- Compiled by Chip Hardy
- Mastered by Glenn Meadows at Masterfonics
