= The Capitol Years =

The Capitol Years may refer to:

- The Capitol Years (1990 Frank Sinatra album), a 1990 three-disc compilation album by Frank Sinatra
- The Capitol Years (1998 Frank Sinatra album), a 1998 21-disc box set by Frank Sinatra
- The Capitol Years (Kingston Trio album), a 1995 album by The Kingston Trio
- The Capitol Years (The Beach Boys album), a 1980 album by The Beach Boys
- The Capitol Years 65/77, a 1998 album by Glen Campbell
- Capitol Years, an American band
