= Best of the Early Years (Glen Campbell album) =

Greatest hits album by Glen Campbell
- Released: 1991
- Genre: Country
- Label: Curb

Professional ratings
Review scores
Source	Rating
Allmusic	link

Best of the Early Years compiles the majority of Glen Campbell's biggest hits from the period 1967 - 1971. Some of his later hits are compiled on another Curb release called Greatest Country Hits.

== Track listing ==
1. "Gentle on My Mind" (John Hartford) - 2:56
2. "By The Time I Get to Phoenix" (Jimmy Webb) - 2:42
3. "Hey Little One" (Dorsey Burnette, Barry DeVorzon) - 2:31
4. "Wichita Lineman" (Jimmy Webb) -3:04
5. "Galveston" (Jimmy Webb) - 2:40
6. "Try a Little Kindness" (Austin/Sapaugh) - 2:23
7. "Honey Come Back" (Jimmy Webb) - 2:56
8. "Everything a Man Could Ever Need" (Mac Davis) - 2:30
9. "It's Only Make Believe" (Conway Twitty, Jack Nance) - 2:25
10. "Dream Baby (How Long Must I Dream)" (Cindy Walker) - 2:32
11. "Your Cheatin' Heart" (Hank Williams) - 3:17
12. "I'm So Lonesome I Could Cry" (Hank Williams) - 2:24

== Production ==
- Art direction/design - Neuman, Walker and Associates
- Liner notes - Don Ovens
- All tracks courtesy of Capitol Records under license from CEMA Special Markets
