= The Legacy (1961–2002) =

Compilation album by Glen Campbell
- Released: October 2003
- Genre: Country
- Label: Capitol

Professional ratings
Review scores
Source	Rating
AllMusic	link

The Legacy (1961–2002) is a boxset covering four decades of recordings by Glen Campbell. The fourth CD is a compilation of live recordings.

In 2019, a revised version of the set, titled The Legacy (1961-2017) was released. It replaced the fourth disc, composed of live recordings, with a disc of studio tracks from albums Campbell had released from 2003 to 2017.

== Track listing ==
Disc 1:

1. "Turn Around, Look At Me" (Jerry Capehart)
2. "Kentucky Means Paradise" (with The Green River Boys) (Merle Travis)
3. "Too Late To Worry - Too Blue To Cry" (Al Dexter)
4. "Universal Soldier" (Buffy St. Marie)
5. "Guess I'm Dumb" (Brian Wilson, Russ Titelman)
6. "Burning Bridges" (Walter Scott)
7. "Just To Satisfy You" (Waylon Jennings, Don Bowman)
8. "Less Of Me" (Glen Campbell)
9. "Gentle On My Mind" (John Hartford)
10. "Cryin'" (Joe Melson, Roy Orbison)
11. "By The Time I Get To Phoenix" (Jimmy Webb)
12. "Tomorrow Never Comes" (Ernest Tubb, Johnny Bond)
13. "Hey, Little One" (Dorsey Burnette, Barry De Vorzon)
14. "I Wanna Live" (John D. Loudermilk)
15. "Turn Around And Look At Me" (Glen Campbell, Jerry Capehart)
16. "The Legend Of Bonnie And Clyde" (Merle Haggard, Buck Owens)
17. "Let It Be Me" (with Bobbie Gentry) (Gilbert Bécaud, Pierre Delanoë, Mann Curtis)
18. "Scarborough Fair/Canticle" (with Bobbie Gentry) (Paul Simon, Art Garfunkel)
19. "Wichita Lineman" (Jimmy Webb)
20. "Dreams of the Everyday Housewife" (Chris Gantry)
21. "Reason To Believe" (Tim Hardin)

Disc 2:

1. "Galveston" (Jimmy Webb)
2. "Where's The Playground Susie" (Jimmy Webb)
3. "If This Is Love" (Glen Campbell, Bill Ezell)
4. "True Grit" (Elmer Bernstein, Don Black)
5. "Try A Little Kindness" (Bobby Austin, Curt Sapaugh)
6. "Honey, Come Back" (Jimmy Webb)
7. "One Pair Of Hands" (Curtis, Campbell)
8. "All I Have to Do Is Dream" (Boudleaux Bryant)
9. "Everything A Man Could Ever Need" (Mac Davis)
10. "It's Only Make Believe" (Conway Twitty, Jack Nance)
11. "Pave Your Way Into Tomorrow" (Billy Graham)
12. "MacArthur Park" (Jimmy Webb)
13. "Dream Baby (How Long Must I Dream)" (Cindy Walker)
14. "The Last Time I Saw Her" (Gordon Lightfoot)
15. "I Say A Little Prayer/By The Time I Get To Phoenix" (with Anne Murray) (Burt Bacharach/Hal David, Jimmy Webb)
16. "The Last Thing On My Mind" (Tom Paxton)
17. "I Knew Jesus (Before He Was A Star)" (Neal Hefti, Stanley Styne)
18. "I'm So Lonesome I Could Cry" (Hank Williams)
19. "Houston (I'm Comin' To See You)" (David Paich)
20. "Bonaparte's Retreat" (Pee Wee King, Redd Stewart)
21. "The Moon's A Harsh Mistress" (Jimmy Webb)

Disc 3:

1. "Rhinestone Cowboy" (Larry Weiss)
2. "Country Boy (You Got Your Feet In LA)" (Dennis Lambert, Brian Potter)
3. "Arkansas" (Mitch Torok, Ramona Redd)
4. "Don't Pull Your Love/Then You Can Tell Me Goodbye" (Dennis Lambert, Brian Potter, John D. Loudermilk)
5. "Southern Nights" (Allen Toussaint)
6. "Sunflower" (Neil Diamond)
7. "God Only Knows" (Brian Wilson, Tony Asher)
8. "I'm Gonna Love You" (Micheal Smotherman)
9. "Can You Fool" (Micheal Smotherman)
10. "Highwayman" (Jimmy Webb)
11. "Somethin' 'Bout You Baby I Like" (with Rita Coolidge) (Richard Supa)
12. "Any Which Way You Can" (Milton Brown, Steve Dorff, Snuff Garrett)
13. "I Was Too Busy Loving You" (Jimmy Webb)
14. "Faithless Love" (John David Souther)
15. "A Lady Like You" (Jim Weatherly, Keith Stegall)
16. "The Hand That Rocks The Cradle" (with Steve Wariner) (Ted Harris)
17. "I Have You" (Gene Nelson, Paul Nelson)
18. "If These Walls Could Speak" (Jimmy Webb)
19. "Unconditional Love" (Donny Lowery, Randy Sharp, Tim Dubois)
20. "She's Gone Gone Gone" (Harlan Howard)
21. "Show Me Your Way" (with Anne Murray) (Craig Fall)
22. "Only One Life" (Jimmy Webb)
23. "Somebody Like That" (Larry Bryant, Geoff Thurman)

Disc 4: Live Performances

1. "The Impossible Dream" (Mitch Leigh, Joe Darion)
2. "The Lord's Prayer" (Albert Hay Malotte)
3. "Didn't We" (Jimmy Webb)
4. "My Way" (Jacques Revaux, Claude François, GliesThibaut, Paul Anka)
5. "Try To Remember/The Way We Were" (Harvey Schmidt, Tom Jones, Marvin Hamlisch, Alan Bergman, Marilyn Bergen)
6. "Galveston" (ballad arrangement) (Jimmy Webb)
7. "Amazing Grace" (John Newton)
8. "Classical Gas" (instrumental) (Mason Williams)
9. "Medley: Good Vibrations/Help Me Rhonda/Surfer Girl/Surfin' U.S.A." (Brian Wilson, Mike Love, Chuck Berry)
10. "Mansion In Branson" (Paul Overstreet, B. Braddock)
11. "Let It Be Me" (with Debby Campbell) (Gilbert Bécaud, Pierre Delanoë, Mann Curtis)
12. "Highwayman" (Jimmy Webb)
13. "The William Tell Overture" (instrumental) (Gioacchino Rossini)
14. "Still Within The Sound Of My Voice" (Jimmy Webb)
15. "Time In A Bottle" (Jim Croce)

== Production ==
- Compilation producer - Mark Copeland
- A & R supervisor - Christopher Clough
- Remastering - Bob Norberg/Capital Mastering
- Art direction - Michelle Azzopardi/Al Quattrocchi/Jeff Smith
- Design - Tornado Design
- Photos - Capitol Records Archives/Glen Campbell Enterprises/Al De Lory
- Guitar photography - James Mitchel Steele
- Memorabilia - Glen Campbell Enterprises
- Liner notes - Joel Selvin
- Discographical annotation - Michael Johnson
- Editorial supervision - Brendan Gormley
- Guitar cover - Ovation Guitars
