= The Essential Glen Campbell Volume Two =

Compilation album by Glen Campbell
- Released: 1995
- Genre: Country
- Label: Capitol; CDP-33829

Professional ratings
Review scores
Source	Rating
Allmusic	4/5 stars

The Essential Glen Campbell Volume Two is the second of a series of three albums which cover Glen Campbell's recordings for Capitol Records between 1962 and 1979. The tracks are presented in a non-chronological order. All three Essential CDs contain, next to single and albums tracks, previously unreleased recordings. On The Essential Glen Campbell Volume Two, these are "My Special Angel", an uptempo version of "Last Thing on My Mind", "Oh Boy" and "Don't It Make You Want To Go Home". The Essential albums are also notable for containing some of the songs from The Artistry of Glen Campbell, the only original studio album by Glen Campbell that has not been released on CD or as a digital download. Included here is "Greensleeves".

== Track listing ==
1. "My Special Angel" (Jimmy Duncan) - 2:13
2. "Twelve-String Special" (Glen Campbell) - 1:49
3. "Less Of Me" (Glen Campbell)- 2:35
4. "You've Still Got a Place in My Heart" (Leon Payne) - 2:29
5. "Gentle On My Mind" (John Hartford) - 2:56
6. "Homeward Bound" (Paul Simon) - 2:38
7. "Last Thing On My Mind" (Tom Paxton)- 2:31
8. "Hey Little One" (Dorsey Burnette, Barry De Vorzon) - 2:31
9. "Try A Little Kindness" (B. Austin, C. Sapaugh) - 2:24
10. "Didn't We" (live) (Jimmy Webb) - 3:50
11. "All I Have To Do Is Dream" (with Bobbie Gentry) (Boudleaux Bryant) - 2:33
12. "You'll Never Walk Alone" (Richard Rodgers/Oscar Hammerstein) - 2:51
13. "Oh Boy" (Sunny West, Norman Petty, Bill Tilghman) - 2:10
14. "If You Could Read My Mind" (Gordon Lightfoot) - 3:43
15. "Greensleeves" (Traditional) - 3:18
16. "Don't It Make You Want To Go Home" (Joe South) - 2:31
17. "Houston (I'm Comin' To See You)" (David Paich) - 3:18
18. "Rhinestone Cowboy" (Larry Weiss) - 3:14
19. "Coming Home" (live) (Billy Wood) - 2:41
20. "Southern Nights" (Allen Toussaint) - 2:57
21. "MacArthur Park" (live) (Jimmy Webb) - 7:17
22. "Highwayman" (Jimmy Webb) - 3:02

== Production ==
- Producers - Nick Venet, Steve Douglas, Al De Lory, Kelly Gordon, Jimmy Bowen, Dennis Lambert, Brian Potter, Gary Klein, Glen Campbell, Tom Thacker
- Art direction - Sherri Halford, Mickey Braithwaite
- Design - Mickey Braithwaite
- Photography - Capitol Records archives
- Liner notes - Patsi Cox
- Compiled by John Johnson
- Re-mastered by Glenn Meadows/Masterfonics, Nashville, TN
