= The Platinum Collection (Glen Campbell album) =

Compilation album by Glen Campbell
- Released: 2006
- Genre: Country
- Label: Rhino
- Producer: Jerry Fuller, Harold Shedd

The Platinum Collection compiles all 9 singles that Glen Campbell released on Atlantic Records (1982–1986) plus 11 album tracks from two of his albums from that period: Old Home Town (1982) and Letter to Home (1984).

== Track listing ==
1. "Old Home Town" (David Pomeranz) - 3:43
2. "I Love How You Love Me" (Mann, Kolber) - 2:35
3. "On The Wings Of My Victory" (Corbin) - 3:36
4. "Faithless Love" (JD Souther) - 3:16
5. "A Lady Like You" (Weatherley, Stegall) - 3:34
6. "(Love Always) Letter To Home" (Carl Jackson) - 2:58
7. "It's Just A Matter Of Time" (Benton, Otis, Hendricks) - 2:28
8. "Cowpoke" (Jones) - 2:46
9. "Call Home" (Reid, Seals) - 3:28
10. "An American Trilogy" (Traditional, Arr. by Mickey Newberry) - 3:46
11. "Goodnight Lady" (Nobles, Cannon) - 4:09
12. "After The Glitter Fades" (Stevie Nicks) - 2:46
13. "Tennessee" (Michael Smotherman) - 3:04
14. "Hang On Baby (Ease My Mind) " (Joe Rainey, Rogers) - 2:33
15. "A Few Good Men" (Joe Rainey) - 3:10
16. "I Was Too Busy Loving You" (Jimmy Webb) - 3:12
17. "Ruth" (Jud Strunk) - 3:02
18. "A Woman's Touch" (Jerry Fuller) - 3:16
19. "Blues (My Naughty Sweetie Gives To Me) (Swanstrom, McCarron, Morgan) - 2:34
20. "Mull of Kintyre" (Paul McCartney, Denny Laine) - 4:20

== Production ==
- Original recordings produced by Jerry Fuller, Harold Shedd
- Compilation - Gary Wallington
- Project Manager -Joe Arditti
- Mastered at Heathmans Studio
- Made in England for Warner Music UK Ltd.
