= Glen Campbell's Greatest Hits =

Greatest hits album by Glen Campbell
- Released: February 1971
- Genre: Country
- Length: 27:46
- Label: Capitol Records
- Producer: Al De Lory

Glen Campbell's Greatest Hits was the first official Capitol compilation album by Glen Campbell and was released in 1971. The Best of Glen Campbell followed in 1976, covering his later hits in addition to five on this compilation.

== Track listing ==
Side 1

1. "Gentle on My Mind" (John Hartford) — 2:59
2. "I Wanna Live" (John D. Loudermilk) — 2:45
3. "Wichita Lineman" (Jimmy Webb) — 3:07
4. "Try a Little Kindness" (B. Austin, C. Sapaugh) — 2:27
5. "Honey Come Back" (Jimmy Webb) — 3:00

Side 2

1. "By the Time I Get to Phoenix" (Jimmy Webb) — 2:45
2. "Galveston" (Jimmy Webb) — 2:42
3. "Where's the Playground Susie" (Jimmy Webb) — 2:57
4. "Dreams of the Everyday Housewife" (Chris Gantry) — 2:36
5. "Burning Bridges" (Walter Scott) — 2:28

== Production ==
- Producer — Al De Lory
- Arranged and conducted by Al De Lory
- "Burning Bridges" arranged and conducted by Leon Russell

== Reception ==
It covers the most productive period of his recording career, the years in which Al De Lory's soaring string arrangements, Jimmy Webb's snapshot songs, and the identifiable low-tuned guitars vaulted Campbell to the upper strata of both the country and pop charts. You simply weren't alive if you didn't hear "Wichita Lineman," "Galveston," or "Try a Little Kindness."

— AllMusic

== Charts ==
Chart	Peak position	Ref
Billboard 200	39	
Billboard Country Albums	3	
