= Love Songs (Glen Campbell album) =

Compilation album by Glen Campbell
- Released: 2000
- Recorded: 1999
- Genre: Pop
- Label: Capitol
- Producer: Jack Jackson

Love Songs, released on the Gold Label in 2000, contains a selection of songs from the Love Songs disc from the 1999 My Hits and Love Songs album.

== Track listing ==
1. "Ebb Tide" (Sigmon, Maxwell) - 2:21
2. "Since I Fell For You" (Johnson) - 2:41
3. "(What a) Wonderful World" (Sam Cooke, Lou Adler, Herb Alpert) - 2:16
4. "It's All in the Game" (Dawes, Sigman) - 2:34
5. "And I Love You So" (Don McLean) - 3:13
6. "Let It Be Me" (Gilbert Bécaud, Mann Curtis) with Debby Campbell - 2:00
7. "Time in a Bottle" (Jim Croce) - 2:19
8. "You've Lost That Lovin' Feeling" (Phil Spector, Barry Mann, Cynthia Weil) - 4:21
9. "Make It Easy On Yourself" (Burt Bacharach, Hal David) - 3:04
10. "Only Love Can Break Your Heart" (Burt Bacharach, Hal David) - 3:20
11. "The Rest Of The Road" (Thurman, Brasher) - 3:33
12. "I Believe" (Drake, Graham, Shirl, Stillman) - 2:06

== Personnel ==
- Glen Campbell - vocals
- Debby Campbell - vocals

== Production ==
- Producer - Jack Jackson/Jack Jackson Music Group, Nashville, TN
- Recorder engineer - Bob Kruson
- Remixes - Nick Smith, Kevin Stagg, Martin Smith, Howard Kruger and Jack Dorsey, England
- Manufactured by The Gold Label -Honest Entertainment from TKO Licensing, Nashville, TN.
