= Foggy Mountain Breakdown =

Bluegrass song

Single by Foggy Mountain Boys
- Released: 1950
- Genre: Country; Bluegrass
- Songwriter: Earl Scruggs

Foggy Mountain Boys singles chronology
"Foggy Mountain Breakdown" (1950)	"'Tis Sweet to Be Remembered" (1952)

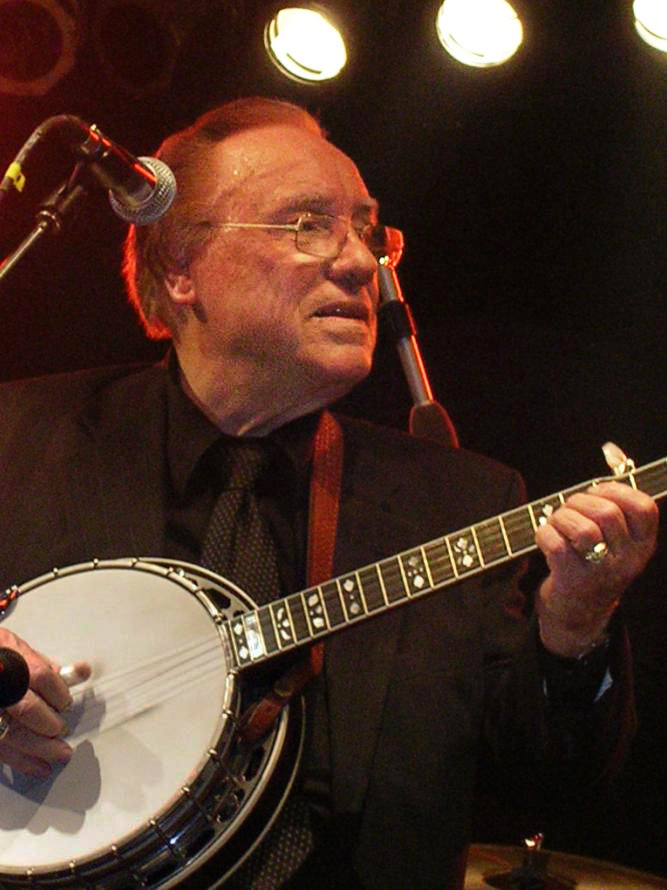
Earl Scruggs in 2005

"Foggy Mountain Breakdown" is a bluegrass instrumental, in the common "breakdown" format, written by Earl Scruggs and first recorded on December 11, 1949, by the bluegrass artists Flatt & Scruggs and the Foggy Mountain Boys. It is a standard in the bluegrass repertoire. The 1949 recording features Scruggs playing a five-string banjo.

It is used as background music in the 1967 motion picture Bonnie and Clyde, especially in the car chase scenes, and has been used in a similar manner in many other films and television programs, particularly when depicting a pursuit scene in a rural setting. In 1968, both the 1949 Mercury Records version and a newly recorded Columbia Records version were listed at one position of the Billboard Hot 100, peaking at no. 55.

In 1969, at the 11th Annual Grammy Awards, "Foggy Mountain Breakdown" earned Lester Flatt & Earl Scruggs a Grammy for Best Country Performance, Duo Or Group – Vocal Or Instrumental. In 1999, the 1950 recording of "Foggy Mountain Breakdown" on Mercury Records credited to Lester Flatt & Earl Scruggs was inducted into the Grammy Hall of Fame.

In 2002, Scruggs won a Grammy award for "Best Country Instrumental Performance" for his 2001 recording of Foggy Mountain Breakdown which featured Steve Martin on second banjo, Albert Lee, Vince Gill, and Randy Scruggs on guitars, Marty Stuart on mandolin, Jerry Douglas on dobro, Leon Russell on organ, Gary Scruggs on harmonica, and Paul Shaffer on piano, among others.

In 2004, it was one of 50 recordings chosen that year by the Library of Congress to be added to the National Recording Registry.

Because of its ubiquity and its status as a favorite tune at bluegrass jams and concerts, guitar and mandolin players commonly learn solo breaks to this song that closely mirror the original banjo version. The instrumental is related to Bill Monroe's "Bluegrass Breakdown", which Scruggs helped write. Both songs feature the same opening double hammer-on, but "Bluegrass Breakdown" goes to an F major chord whereas "Foggy Mountain Breakdown" goes to the G major chord's relative minor, an E minor chord.

== Chart performance ==
Chart performance for "Foggy Mountain Breakdown"
Chart (1967–68)	Peak position
U.S. Billboard Hot Country Singles	58
U.S. Billboard Hot 100	55
CAN RPM Top 100 Singles	90
UK Singles Chart	39

== Various recordings ==
- Glen Campbell recorded the song on his 1981 album Glen Campbell Live.
- The Nitty Gritty Dirt Band recorded the song on the critically-acclaimed and platinum-selling album Will the Circle Be Unbroken.
- The Cuban Boys engineered an electronica-inspired version of the song for their early EP Blueprint for Modernisation (appearing again in their Art Vs. Commerce – The Singles Collection).
