= Wichita Lineman (album) =

Studio album by Glen Campbell
- Released: November 4, 1968
- Recorded: 1968
- Studio: Capitol (Hollywood)
- Genre: Country
- Length: 29:02
- Label: Capitol
- Producer: Al De Lory

Glen Campbell chronology
That Christmas Feeling (1968)	Wichita Lineman (1968)	Galveston (1969)

Professional ratings
Review scores
Source	Rating
Allmusic	4/5 stars

Wichita Lineman is the eleventh studio album by American singer-guitarist Glen Campbell, released in 1968 by Capitol Records.

== Track listing ==
Side 1

1. "Wichita Lineman" (Jimmy Webb) – 3:08
2. "(Sittin' On) The Dock of the Bay" (Otis Redding, Steve Cropper) – 2:35
3. "If You Go Away" (Jacques Brel, Rod McKuen) – 2:07
4. "Ann" (Billy Edd Wheeler) – 1:56
5. "Words" (Barry Gibb, Robin Gibb, Maurice Gibb) – 2:50
6. "Fate of Man" (Glen Campbell) – 2:38

Side 2

1. "Dreams of the Everyday Housewife" (Chris Gantry) – 2:45
2. "The Straight Life" (Sonny Curtis) – 2:55
3. "Reason to Believe" (Tim Hardin) – 2:20
4. "You Better Sit Down Kids" (Sonny Bono) – 3:13
5. "That's Not Home" (Billy Graham) – 2:35

== Personnel ==
Music

- Glen Campbell – vocals, acoustic guitar, electric guitars
- Carol Kaye – bass guitar
- Hal Blaine – drums
- Bob Felts – drums
- Al Casey – acoustic guitar
- Dennis McCarthy – piano
- Joe Osborn – bass guitar
- Jim Gordon – drums
- Ray Pohlman – bass guitar
- Jimmy Webb – organ on "Wichita Lineman"

Production

- Al De Lory – producer, arranger

== Charts ==
Album – Billboard (United States)

Chart	Entry date	Peak position
Billboard Country Albums	11/16/1968	1
Billboard Top LPs	11/16/1968	1

Singles – Billboard (United States)

Year	Single	Hot Country Singles	Hot 100	Easy Listening
1968	"Dreams of the Everyday Housewife"	3	32	6
1968	"Wichita Lineman"	1	3	1

== Awards ==
At the 11th Annual Grammy Awards held in 1969, Wichita Lineman won Best Engineered Recording (Non-Classical) for Hugh Davies & Joe Polito, engineers.
In 2000, the single Wichita Lineman was inducted into the Grammy Hall of Fame.
