= Merry Christmas (Glen Campbell album) =

Compilation album by Glen Campbell
- Released: August 1991
- Genre: Christmas
- Label: Liberty

Merry Christmas is a compilation of Christmas songs that originally appeared on That Christmas Feeling (1968), Oh Happy Day (1970), The Christmas Sound of Music (1969) and The Night Before Christmas (1984).

Professional ratings
Review scores
Source	Rating
Allmusic	link

== Track listing ==
1. "The Christmas Song (Merry Christmas to You)" (Mel Tormé/Rob Wells) - 3:02
2. "Have Yourself a Merry Little Christmas" (Hugh Martin/Ralph Blane) - 3:11
3. "Christmas Is for Children" (Sammy Cahn/Jimmy Van Heusen) - 3:19
4. "Silent Night, Holy Night" (Frans Gruber/Joseph Mohr) - 2:29
5. "One Pair of Hands" (Billy Campbell/Manny Curtis) - 2:30
6. "White Christmas" (Irving Berlin) - 2:42
7. "Pretty Paper" (Willie Nelson) - 2:34
8. "It Must Be Getting Close to Christmas" (Cahn/Van Heusen) - 2:29
9. "There's No Place Like Home" (Cahn; adapted from "Home! Sweet Home!" by Henry Bishop and John Howard Payne) - 3:16
10. "The Night Before Christmas" (Traditional) - 3:19

== Production ==
- Art direction/design - Simon Levy
- Photography - Peter Nash
- Digital editing by Milan Bogdan
- Mastered by Glenn Meadows at Masterfonics
