= Sings the Best of Jimmy Webb 1967–1992 =

Sings the Best of Jimmy Webb 1967-1992

Compilation album by Glen Campbell
- Released: 2006
- Genre: Country
- Label: Raven

Professional ratings
Review scores
Source	Rating
Allmusic	4.5/5 stars

The songs on Sings the Best of Jimmy Webb 1967–1992 are single and album tracks recorded by Glen Campbell between 1967 and 1992, all written, as the title indicates, by Jimmy Webb.

It was compiled by Peter Shillito, Kevin Mueller, Glenn A. Baker, annotated by Stephen Thomas Erlewine, mastered by Warren Barnett of The Raven Lab, and designed by Louise Cook of Louisville Graphics.

== Track listing ==
1. "Galveston" - 2:40
2. "Wichita Lineman" - 3:06
3. "By the Time I Get to Phoenix" - 2:43
4. "Just Another Piece of Paper" - 2:10
5. "Where's the Playground Susie" - 2:56
6. "Didn't We" - 3:46
7. "Honey Come Back" - 2:58
8. "Just This One Time" - 3:46
9. "You Might as Well Smile" - 3:35
10. "The Moon's a Harsh Mistress" - 3:07
11. "Wishing Now" - 3:16
12. "Ocean in His Eyes" - 3:27
13. "It's a Sin When You Love Somebody" - 2:24
14. "I Keep It Hid" - 3:27
15. "Adoration" - 3:16
16. "Highwayman" - 3:02
17. "This Is Sarah's Song" - 2:35
18. "I Was Too Busy Loving You" - 3:08
19. "Still Within the Sound of My Voice" - 4:08
20. "For Sure, For Certain, For Always" - 3:16
21. "Lightning in a Bottle" - 4:04
22. "If These Walls Could Speak" - 2:58
23. "Light Years" - 3:47
24. "Only One Life" - 4:05
