= My Hits and Love Songs =

Studio album by Glen Campbell
- Released: 20 September 1999
- Recorded: 1999
- Label: EMI
- Producer: Jack Jackson

Glen Campbell chronology
A Glen Campbell Christmas (1998)	My Hits and Love Songs (1999)	Glen Campbell in Concert with the South Dakota Symphony (2001)

Professional ratings
Review scores
Source	Rating
Cross Rhythms	8/10

My Hits and Love Songs is the fifty-seventh album by American singer-guitarist Glen Campbell, released in 1999. It consists of a compilation disc My Hits and a new studio album Love Songs.

== Track listing ==
Sourced from AllMusic and the CD album booklet.

Disc 1: My Hits

1. "Your Cheatin' Heart" (Hank Williams) – 3:17
2. "Wichita Lineman" (Jimmy Webb) – 3:06
3. "By The Time I Get to Phoenix" (Jimmy Webb) – 2:42
4. "Galveston" (Jimmy Webb) – 2:39
5. "Where's the Playground Suzie" (Jimmy Webb) – 2:55
6. "Gentle on My Mind" (John Hartford) – 2:56
7. "Let It Be Me" (Gilbert Bécaud, Mann Curtis) with Bobbie Gentry – 2:04
8. "Honey Come Back" (Jimmy Webb) – 3:02
9. "The Last Thing on My Mind" (Paxton) – 3:54
10. "Dreams of the Everyday Housewife" (Gantry) – 2:34
11. "Both Sides Now" (Joni Mitchell) – 3:44
12. "Reason to Believe" (Tim Hardin) – 2:15
13. "Try a Little Kindness" (Austin, Sapaugh) – 2:24
14. "All I Have To Do Is Dream" (Boudleaux Bryant) with Bobbie Gentry – 2:33
15. "It's Only Make Believe" (Conway Twitty, Jack Nance) – 2:26
16. "Country Boy (You Got Your Feet in LA)" (Lambert, Brian Potter) – 3:05
17. "Southern Nights" (Allen Toussaint) – 3:07
18. "Rhinestone Cowboy" (Larry Weiss) – 3:08

Disc 2: Love Songs

1. "(What a) Wonderful World" (Sam Cooke, Lou Adler, Herb Alpert) – 2:16
2. "Feelings" (Albert, Kaiserman, Gate) – 3:42
3. "Without You" (Pete Ham, Tom Evans) – 3:06
4. "Make It Easy on Yourself" (Burt Bacharach, Hal David) – 3:04
5. "I Believe" (Drake, Graham, Shirl, Stillman) – 2:06
6. "Bridge Over Troubled Water" (Paul Simon) – 4:38
7. "Ebb Tide" (Sigman, Maxwell) – 2:21
8. "It's All in the Game" (Dawes, Sigman) – 2:34
9. "Since I Fell for You" (Buddy Johnson) – 2:41
10. "You've Lost That Lovin' Feeling" (Phil Spector, Barry Mann, Cynthia Weil) – 4:21
11. "You Don't Have To Say You Love Me" (Vicki Wickham, Simon Napier-Bell, Pino Donaggio, Vito Pallavicini) – 2:37
12. "Time in a Bottle" (Jim Croce) – 2:19
13. "Let It Be Me" (Gilbert Bécaud, Mann Curtis) with Debby Campbell – 2:00
14. "The Impossible Dream" (Joe Darion, Mitch Leigh) – 2:39
15. "And I Love You So" (Don McLean) – 3:13
16. "The Rest of the Road" (Thurman, Brasher) – 3:33
17. "Only Love Can Break a Heart" (Burt Bacharach, Hal David) – 3:20
18. "You'll Never Walk Alone" (Oscar Hammerstein II, Richard Rodgers) – 2:45

== Personnel ==
Sourced from the CD album booklet.

- Glen Campbell – vocals
- Debby Campbell – vocals

== Production ==
Sourced from the CD album booklet.

- Producer – Jack Jackson/Jack Jackson Music Group, Nashville, TN
- Recorder engineer – Bob Kruson
- Remixed by Nick Smith/Hatch Farm Studios, Surrey, England
- Photography – Jeff Ross
- Design – The Red Room
- Manufactured by EMI under exclusive licence from TKO Licensing Limited as exclusive agent for the Kruger Organization, Inc.
- My Hits – copyright owned by Capitol Records
- Love Songs – copyright owned by TKO Licensing, LTD
