= Glen Campbell Collection =

Compilation album by Glen Campbell
- Released: April 2004
- Genre: Country
- Label: EMI Gold

Professional ratings
Review scores
Source	Rating
Allmusic	link

Glen Campbell Collection is a compilation album by Glen Campbell released in 2004 as a double CD and consisting of hits and album tracks recorded in the sixties, seventies and nineties. It is also released on digital media by EMI Gold. Some tracks were remastered in 2001, 2002 and 2003.

== Track listing ==
Disc 1:

1. "By The Time I Get To Phoenix" (Jimmy Webb)
2. "Help Me Make It Through the Night" (Kris Kristofferson)
3. "Bridge Over Troubled Water" (Paul Simon)
4. "It's Only Make Believe" (Conway Twitty, Jack Nance)
5. "Unconditional Love" (Lowery, Sharp, Dubois)
6. "All I Have To Do Is Dream" (with Bobbie Gentry) (Boudleaux Bryant)
7. "Gentle On My Mind" (John Hartford)
8. "If Not For You" (Bob Dylan)
9. "Elusive Butterfly" (Lind)
10. "Galveston" (Jimmy Webb)
11. "(I Never Promised You A) Rose Garden" (South)
12. "Mr. Tambourine Man" (instrumental) (Bob Dylan)
13. "For The Good Times" (with Ernie Ford) (Kris Kristofferson)
14. "God Only Knows" (Brian Wilson, Tony Asher)
15. "King of the Road" (instrumental) (Roger Miller)
16. "Little Green Apples" (with Bobbie Gentry) (Russell)
17. "You'll Never Walk Alone" (Richard Rodgers, Oscar Hammerstein)

Disc 2:

1. "Your Cheatin' Heart" (Hank Williams)
2. "Honey Come Back" (Jimmy Webb)
3. "For Once In My Life" (Murden, Miller)
4. "There Goes My Everything" (with Ernie Ford) (Frazier)
5. "Tomorrow Never Comes" (Ernest Tubb, Bond)
6. "California" (Micheal Smotherman)
7. "Crying" (Roy Orbison, Joe Melson)
8. "Rhinestone Cowboy" (Larry Weiss)
9. "Living In A House Full Of Love" (Sutton, Sherrill)
10. "Country Boy (You Got Your Feet In LA)" (Lambert, Potter)
11. "Cold Cold Heart" (Hank Williams)
12. "He Ain't Heavy, He's My Brother" (Bob Russell, Bobby Scott)
13. "Homeward Bound" (Paul Simon)
14. "I Believe" (Drake, Shirl, Stillman, Graham)
15. "Reason To Believe" (Tim Hardin)
16. "Marie" (Randy Newman)
17. "William Tell Overture" (Gioachino Rossini)
