= Al De Lory =

American record producer, arranger, and musician (1930–2012)

- Born: Alfred V. De Lory; January 31, 1930; Los Angeles, California, U.S.
- Died: February 5, 2012 (aged 82) Nashville, Tennessee, U.S.
- Genres: Pop, surf rock, country
- Occupations: Record producer, arranger, composer, musician, conductor
- Instrument: Keyboards
- Years active: 1950s–2000s
- Label: Capitol Records
- Formerly of: The Wrecking Crew

Alfred V. De Lory (January 31, 1930 – February 5, 2012) was an American record producer, arranger, conductor and session musician. He was the producer and arranger of a series of worldwide hits by Glen Campbell in the 1960s, including John Hartford's "Gentle on My Mind", Jimmy Webb's "By the Time I Get to Phoenix", "Wichita Lineman" and "Galveston". He was also a member of the 1960s Los Angeles session musicians known as the Wrecking Crew, and inducted into the Musicians Hall of Fame and Museum in 2007.

== Biography ==
Born in Los Angeles, De Lory was the son of a studio musician. As a child he studied piano and began arranging music while in the Army. Upon his discharge, he worked as a pianist in studio orchestras and in clubs.

In the late 1950s De Lory co-wrote the 1960 #1 hit novelty song "Mr. Custer", recorded by Larry Verne. As an L.A. based session musician in the early 1960s De Lory played keyboards for various Phil Spector "Wall of Sound" productions, recordings of Surf rock, and The Beach Boys' Pet Sounds.

By the mid-1960s Ken Nelson had hired him as producer and arranger for Capitol Records, and he provided a key element in the success of Glen Campbell's million selling hit singles and albums from 1967 to 1972. As a bandleader he had his own hit in 1970 with an instrumental version of the "Song from M*A*S*H". In the 1970s he moved to Nashville, producing country artists and film soundtracks, (including The Devil's Rain). He also played and recorded with his own Latin Jazz groups.

De Lory's youngest child, daughter, Donna De Lory, is a singer, session musician and recording artist. De Lory and Niki Haris were backing vocalists for Madonna, appearing on numerous albums, in videos and accompanying her on tour. De Lory's oldest daughter, Jolene, appeared on the single "Sing," by The Carpenters. His son, Alan DeLory, is also a singer/songwriter.

De Lory died in Nashville, Tennessee, at the age of 82.

== Selected discography ==
=== As session musician ===
- 1962 "He's a Rebel" – The Crystals. Produced by Phil Spector
- 1963 "Zip-a-Dee-Doo-Dah" – Bob B. Soxx & the Blue Jeans. Produced by Phil Spector
- 1963 A Christmas Gift for You – Various Artists. Produced by Phil Spector
- 1963 "Hey Little Cobra" – The Rip Chords. Produced by Terry Melcher and Bruce Johnston
- 1965 Wonderful Life – Irene Kral
- 1966 Pet Sounds – The Beach Boys. Produced by Brian Wilson

Also Jan & Dean, The Hondells, Doris Day, Tina Turner, The Righteous Brothers

=== As producer and/or arranger ===
==== Glen Campbell albums ====
- 1967 Burning Bridges
- 1967 Gentle on My Mind (#5 US album)
- 1967 By the Time I Get to Phoenix (#15 US album)
- 1968 Hey Little One (#26 US album)
- 1968 A New Place in the Sun (#24 US album)
- 1968 Bobbie Gentry and Glen Campbell (#11 US album)
- 1968 That Christmas Feeling (#1 Billboard Christmas album)
- 1968 Wichita Lineman (#1 US album)
- 1969 Galveston (#2 US album)
- 1969 True Grit (#77 US album)
- 1969 Glen Campbell Live (#13 US album)
- 1970 Try a Little Kindness (#12 US album)
- 1970 Oh Happy Day (#38 US album)
- 1970 Norwood (#90 US album)
- 1970 The Glen Campbell Goodtime Album (#27 US album)
- 1971 The Last Time I Saw Her (#87 US album)
- 1971 Anne Murray / Glen Campbell (#128 US album)
- 1972 The Artistry of Glen Campbell

==== Other artists ====
Donovan, The Four Preps, Dobie Gray, The Lettermen, Donna Loren, Al Martino, Anne Murray, Jim Nabors, Wayne Newton, Andy Russell, The Sugar Shoppe, The Turtles, Ricky Van Shelton

=== As bandleader ===
- 1969 The Glen Campbell Song Book
- 1969 Plays "Midnight Cowboy"
- 1970 Plays Song from M*A*S*H
- 1970 Theme from Love Story and Other Themes of Romance
- 1980 Somebody's Knockin′
- 1996 Floreando: Salsa Jazz
- 2009 Hot Gandinga: Hotter Than Hot Salsa Jazz!

=== Soundtrack composer ===
- 1973 Jory
- 1974 Buster and Billie
- 1975 The Devil's Rain
- 1985 What Comes Around

== Awards ==
- 1967 Grammy Award - Best Country & Western Recording: "Gentle On My Mind". Producer: Al De Lory
- 1968 Grammy Award - Album of the Year: By The Time I Get To Phoenix. Producer: Al De Lory
