= Super Hits (Glen Campbell album) =

Greatest hits album by Glen Campbell
- Released: 2000
- Genre: Country
- Length: 31:20
- Label: Atlantic

Super Hits is a 2000 compilation album by Glen Campbell. It compiles all nine singles that Glen Campbell released on Atlantic Records (1982–1986) plus "I Love My Truck" which was released as a single A-side in 1981 (Mirage Records).

== Track listing ==
1. "I Love My Truck" (Joe Rainey) - 2:58
2. "Old Home Town" (David Pomeranze) - 3:43
3. "I Love How You Love Me" (Barry Mann, Larry Kolber) - 2:35
4. "Faithless Love" (John David Souther) - 3:16
5. "On The Wings Of My Victory" (Bob Corbin) - 3:35
6. "(Love Always) Letter To Home" (Carl Jackson) - 2:56
7. "A Lady Like You" (Jim Weatherly, Keigh Stegall) - 3:34
8. "Cowpoke" (Stan Jones) - 2:46
9. "It's Just A Matter Of Time" (Brook Benton, Belford Hendricks, Clyde Otis) - 2:28
10. "Call Home" (Troy Seals. Mike Reid) - 3:29

== Production ==
- Compilation production - Mike Griffith
- Art direction - Aimee McMahan
- Design - George Otvos
- Photography - Alan A. Taylor
