= I'll Paint You a Song =

Compilation album by Glen Campbell
- Released: 1975
- Genre: Country
- Label: Pickwick

I'll Paint You a Song is a compilation of the vocal tracks from the soundtrack albums Norwood and True Grit, plus "Private John Q," previously released as a 1965 Capitol single.

== Track listing ==
Side 1:

1. "I'll Paint You A Song" (Mac Davis) - 4:08
2. "Marie" (M. Torok, R. Redd) - 2:34
3. "Ol' Norwood's Comin' Home" (M. Torok, R. Redd) - 1:48
4. "Everything A Man Could Ever Need" (Mac Davis) - 2:29

Side 2:

1. "True Grit" (Don Black, Elmer Bernstein) - 2:29
2. "The Repo Man" (Mac Davis) - 1:54
3. "Norwood (Me And My Guitar)" (Mac Davis) - 2:37
4. "Private John Q" (Roger Miller) - 1:53
5. "Down Home" (Mac Davis) - 2:05
