= The Essential Glen Campbell Volume Three =

Compilation album by Glen Campbell
- Released: 1995
- Genre: Country
- Label: Capitol; CDP-33834

The Essential Glen Campbell Volume Three is the third of a series of three albums which cover Glen Campbell's recordings for Capitol Records from 1962-79. The tracks are presented in a non-chronological order. All three Essential CDs contain, next to single and albums tracks, previously unreleased recordings. On The Essential Glen Campbell Volume Three, these are "Beautiful Brown Eyes", "They'll Never Take Her Love from Me", "All the Way" and "Learnin' the Blues". The last two songs are from a 1979 recording session led by Nelson Riddle. The Essential albums are also notable for containing some of the songs from The Artistry of Glen Campbell, the only original studio album by Campbell that has not been released on CD or as a digital download. Included here is "Tequila".

Professional ratings
Review scores
Source	Rating
Allmusic	link

== Track listing ==
1. "Beautiful Brown Eyes" (Arthur Smith, Lionel Delmore, Jerry Capehart) - 2:17
2. "Tomorrow Never Comes" (Johnny Bond, Ernest Tubb) - 2:28
3. "Guess I'm Dumb" (Brian Wilson, Russ Titelman) - 2:40
4. "Sassy" (Billy Strange) - 2:10
5. "Crying" (Roy Orbison, Joe Melson) - 2:51
6. "By the Time I Get to Phoenix" (Jimmy Webb) - 2:42
7. "They'll Never Take Her Love from Me" (Leon Payne) - 2:20
8. "I Wanna Live" (John D. Loudermilk) - 2:43
9. "Wichita Lineman" (Webb) - 3:05
10. "Turn Around, Look at Me" (Capehart) - 2:53
11. "Where's the Playground Susie" (Webb) - 2:55
12. "Honey Come Back" (Webb) - 2:56
13. "Tequila" (Chuck Rio) - 2:39
14. "Today Is Mine" (Jerry Reed) - 3:41
15. "I Will Never Pass This Way Again" (Ronnie Gaylord) - 2:41
16. "I'm So Lonesome I Could Cry" (Hank Williams) - 2:25
17. "Bonaparte's Retreat" (Pee Wee King, Redd Stewart) - 2:46
18. "Annie's Song" (Live) (John Denver) - 3:00
19. "Don't Pull Your Love/Then You Can Tell Me Goodbye" (Dennis Lambert, Brian Potter, Loudermilk) - 3:20
20. "Can You Fool" (Micheal Smotherman) - 3:16
21. "All the Way" (Jimmy Van Heusen, Sammy Cahn) - 3:36
22. "Learnin' the Blues" (Dolores Vicki Silvers) - 3:25

== Production ==
- Producers - Nick Venet, Brian Wilson, Al De Lory, Jimmy Bowen, Dennis Lambert, Brian Potter, Glen Campbell, Steve Douglas
- Art direction/design - Mickey Braithwaite
- Photography - Country Music Foundation
- Graphics - Cindy Simmons, Nancy H. Williams
- Compiled by John Johnson
- Remastered by Glenn Meadows/Masterfonics, Nashville, TN
