= A Glen Campbell Christmas =

- Original album cover of 1998 TNN release

Studio album by Glen Campbell
- Released: December 1998
- Recorded: 1998, at Twin Creek Studio and Money Pit Studio, Nashville, TN
- Genre: Christmas
- Label: TNN
- Producer: Barry Beckett, Eddie Bayers

Glen Campbell chronology
Christmas with Glen Campbell (1995)	A Glen Campbell Christmas (1998)	My Hits and Love Songs (1999)

Alternative cover
- Album cover of 1999 repackaged Unison/TNN release

Professional ratings
Review scores
Source	Rating
Allmusic	2/5 stars

A Glen Campbell Christmas is the fifty-sixth album by American singer/guitarist Glen Campbell, released in 1998 on the TNN Classic Sessions label (see 1998 in music). In 1999 the album was repackaged and released on the Unison/TNN label.

== Track listing ==
1. "The First Noel" (traditional) – 2:32
2. "O Little Town of Bethlehem" (traditional) – 2:29
3. "God Rest Ye Merry Gentlemen" (traditional) – 2:41
4. "Silent Night" (traditional) – 2:30
5. "Hark the Herald Angels Sing" (traditional) – 3:07
6. "Away In A Manger" (traditional) – 3:00
7. "What Child Is This" (traditional) – 3:30
8. "O Come All Ye Faithful" (traditional) – 2:18
9. "It Came Upon a Midnight Clear" (traditional) – 3:15
10. "O Holy Night" (traditional) – 3:56
11. "Joy to the World" (traditional) – 2:33

== Personnel ==
- Eddie Bayers – percussion
- Dennis Burnside – keyboards
- Michael Rhodes – bass guitar
- Brent Rowan – electric guitar
- Background vocals – the Belmont University Choir, directed by Tim Sharp

== Production ==
- Executive producer – Martin Clayton, Brian Hughes, Paul Corbin
- Producer – Barry Beckett, Eddie Bayers
- Arranger – Dennis Burnside
- Engineer – Pete Green
- Second engineer – David Boyer
- Liner notes – Michael Gray
- Project coordinator – Kate Haggerty
- Art direction – Biz Woodie
- Design – Alter Ego Design
- Photography – Jim Hagans

== Awards ==
The album won a Dove Award for Best Country Album in 1999. The album was also nominated for a Grammy for Best Southern, Country of Bluegrass Gospel Album.
