= A Lady Like You =

Single by Glen Campbell

from the album Letter to Home
- B-side: "Tennessee"
- Released: November 26, 1984
- Genre: Country
- Length: 3:33
- Label: Atlantic
- Songwriter(s): Keith Stegall, Jim Weatherly
- Producer(s): Harold Shedd

Glen Campbell singles chronology
"Slow Nights" (1984)	"A Lady Like You" (1984)	"(Love Always) Letter to Home" (1985)

"A Lady Like You" is a song written by Keith Stegall and Jim Weatherly, and recorded by American country music artist Glen Campbell. It was released in November 1984 as the second single from the album Letter to Home. The song reached number 4 on the Billboard Hot Country Singles & Tracks chart.

== Chart performance ==
Chart (1984–1985)	Peak position
US Hot Country Songs (Billboard)	4
