= By the Time I Get to Phoenix (Glen Campbell album) =

Studio album by Glen Campbell
- Released: November 1967
- Recorded: 1967
- Studio: Capitol, Hollywood
- Genre: Country, folk
- Length: 26:31
- Label: Capitol/EMI
- Producer: Al De Lory, Nick Venet

Glen Campbell chronology
| Gentle on My Mind (1967) | By the Time I Get to Phoenix (1967) | Hey Little One (1968) |

Professional ratings
Review scores
| Source | Rating |
|---|---|
| Allmusic | 4/5 stars |

By the Time I Get to Phoenix is the seventh studio album by American singer-guitarist Glen Campbell, released in November 1967 by Capitol Records.

In March 1969, the album won the Grammy for Album of the Year (for 1968), the first country album to do so. In February 1968, the album's lead single "By the Time I Get to Phoenix", released October 1967, won Grammys for both Best Vocal Performance, Male and Best Contemporary Male Solo Vocal Performance (for 1967). In 2004, "By the Time I Get to Phoenix" was inducted in the Grammy Hall of Fame.

== Track listing ==
Side one
| No. | Title | Writer(s) | Length |
|---|---|---|---|
| 1. | "By the Time I Get to Phoenix" | Jimmy Webb | 2:42 |
| 2. | "Homeward Bound" | Paul Simon | 2:37 |
| 3. | "Tomorrow Never Comes" | Ernest Tubb, Johnny Bond | 2:27 |
| 4. | "Cold December (In Your Heart)" | Alex Hassilev | 2:27 |
| 5. | "My Baby's Gone" | Hazel Houser | 2:50 |
| 6. | "Back in the Race" | Glen Campbell, Vic Dana | 1:56 |

Side two
| No. | Title | Writer(s) | Length |
|---|---|---|---|
| 1. | "Hey Little One" | Dorsey Burnette, Barry De Vorzon | 2:30 |
| 2. | "Bad Seed" | Bill Anderson | 2:18 |
| 3. | "I'll Be Lucky Someday" | Lee Martin, Dick McBride, Bob Wills | 2:24 |
| 4. | "You're Young and You'll Forget" | Jerry Reed | 2:15 |
| 5. | "Love Is a Lonesome River" | Glen Campbell, Kella Christian | 2:05 |
| Total length: | | | 26:31 |

== Personnel ==
Music

- Glen Campbell – vocals, acoustic guitar
- James Burton – acoustic guitar, electric guitars
- Joe Osborn – bass guitar
- Jim Gordon – drums
- Bud Shank – flute

Production

- Al De Lory – producer, arranger, conductor
- Nick Venet – producer ("Tomorrow Never Comes")
- Mort Garson – arranger ("Cold December" and "Bad Seed")
- Leon Russell – arranger ("My Baby's Gone")
- Jimmie Haskell – arranger ("Tomorrow Never Comes")
- Ed Simpson, Capitol Photo Studio – photography

== Charts ==
Album – Billboard (United States)

| Entry date | Chart | Peak position |
|---|---|---|
| 12/30/1967 | Billboard Country Albums | 1 |
| 12/30/1967 | Billboard Top LPs | 15 |

Singles – Billboard (United States)

| Year | Single | Hot 100 | Hot Country Singles | Easy Listening |
|---|---|---|---|---|
| 1967 | "By the Time I Get to Phoenix" | 26 | 2 | 12 |
| 1968 | "Hey Little One" | 54 | 13 | 20 |
