= Rhinestone Cowboy/Bloodline The Lambert & Potter Sessions 1975–1976 =

Compilation album by Glen Campbell
- Released: 2002
- Genre: Country
- Label: Raven

Professional ratings
Review scores
Source	Rating
Allmusic	link
No Depression	link

Rhinestone Cowboy/Bloodline The Lambert & Potter Sessions 1975–1976 covers the complete Rhinestone Cowboy and Bloodline albums plus three bonus tracks.

== Track listing ==
1. "Country Boy (You Got Your Feet In LA)" (Dennis Lambert, Brian Potter) – 3:08
2. "Comeback" (Dennis Lambert, Brian Potter) – 3:23
3. "Count On Me" (Dennis Lambert, Brian Potter) – 3:12
4. "I Miss You Tonight" (Dennis Lambert, Brian Potter) – 3:07
5. "My Girl" (Smokey Robinson, Ronald White) – 3:14
6. "Rhinestone Cowboy" (Larry Weiss) – 3:16
7. "I'd Build A Bridge" (Settle) – 3:43
8. "Pencils For Sale" (Cunningham) – 3:42
9. "Marie" (Randy Newman) – 3:34
10. "We're Over" (Barry Mann, Cynthia Weil) – 2:59
11. "Baby Don't Be Giving Me Up" (Dennis Lambert, Brian Potter) – 3:31
12. "See You On Sunday" (Dennis Lambert, Brian Potter) – 3:35
13. "Don't Pull Your Love/Then You Can Tell Me Goodbye" (Dennis Lambert, Brian Potter, John D. Loudermilk) – 3:22
14. "Christiaan No" (Jimmy Webb) – 2:34
15. "Bloodline" (Geyer) – 4:32
16. "Everytime I Sing A Love Song" (Sklerov, Molinary) – 3:09
17. "Lay Me Down (Roll Me Out To Sea)" (Larry Weiss) – 3:09
18. "The Bottom Line" (Dennis Lambert, Brian Potter) – 3:35
19. "I Got Love For You Ruby" (Linzer) – 3:37
20. "San Francisco Is A Lonely Town" (Peters) – 3:21
21. "Record Collector's Dream" (Billy Graham) – 3:00
22. "Houston (I'm Comin' To See You) (David Paich) – 3:19
23. "Bonaparte's Retreat" (King) – 2:45

== Production ==
- Producers – Dennis Lambert, Brian Potter, Jimmy Bowen
- Compiled by Pete Shillito, Glenn A. Baker, Kevin Mueller
- Mastered by Warren Barnett, The Raven Lab
- Design and layout by Gregg Klein, Alan Duffy
- Photographs from The Glenn A. Baker Archives and original albums
