= That Christmas Feeling =

Studio album by Glen Campbell
- Released: October 1968
- Recorded: 1968
- Studio: Capitol (Hollywood)
- Genres: Country, Christmas
- Length: 32:11
- Label: Capitol
- Producer: Al De Lory

Glen Campbell chronology
Bobbie Gentry and Glen Campbell (1968)	That Christmas Feeling (1968)	Wichita Lineman (1968)

That Christmas Feeling is the tenth studio album and the first Christmas album by American singer-guitarist Glen Campbell, released in 1968 by Capitol Records.

== Reissues ==
While the album has never been formally reissued on CD in the United States, the Netherlands-based Disky Records label issued a CD version (with different cover art) in 2003. In 2010 Capitol Records Nashville made the album available as a digital download, with the original cover art and two bonus tracks ("The Night Before Christmas" and "Silent Night") taken from the 1969 BFGoodrich compilation album The Christmas Sound of Music. In 2013, Capitol Records reissued it in the United States, but with a different title (Icon Christmas) and cover art. It was reissued in 2016 on Vinyl, by Capital UMe a Universal Company with the original cover art.

== Track listing ==
Side 1

1. "Christmas Is for Children" (Sammy Cahn, Jimmy Van Heusen) – 3:18
2. "Old Toy Trains" (Roger Miller) – 2:20
3. "Little Altar Boy" (Howlett Smith) – 3:57
4. "It Must Be Getting Close to Christmas" (Sammy Cahn, Jimmy Van Heusen) – 2:25
5. "Have Yourself a Merry Little Christmas" (Hugh Martin, Ralph Blane) – 3:03
6. "Blue Christmas" (Billy Hayes, Jay Johnson) – 2:33

Side 2

1. "The Christmas Song" (Mel Tormé, Robert Wells) – 2:59
2. "Pretty Paper" (Willie Nelson) – 2:31
3. "There's No Place Like Home" (Henry Bishop, John Howard Payne; based on "Home! Sweet Home!" and adapted by Sammy Cahn) – 3:15
4. "I'll Be Home for Christmas" (Kim Gannon, Walter Kent, Buck Ram) – 3:00
5. "Christmas Day" (Jimmy Holiday, L. White) – 2:50

== Personnel ==
Music

- Glen Campbell – vocals, acoustic guitar

Production

- Al De Lory – producer, arranger, and conductor
- Rick Rankin/Capitol Photo Studio – photography

== Charts ==
Album – Billboard (United States)

Chart	Entry date	Peak position	No. of weeks
Billboard Christmas Albums	12-07-1968	1(2)	10
Billboard Christmas Albums	1969	4	10
Billboard Christmas Albums	1970	23	10
Billboard Christmas Albums	1971	14	10

Singles – Billboard (United States)

Year	Single	Christmas Singles
1968	"Christmas Is for Children"	7
