= Letter to Home =

Studio album by Glen Campbell
- Released: May 1984
- Recorded: 1984
- Studio: Music Mills Studios, Nashville, Tennessee
- Genre: Country
- Label: Atlantic
- Producer: Harold Shedd

Glen Campbell chronology
Old Home Town (1982)	Letter to Home (1984)	No More Night (1985)

Professional ratings
Review scores
Source	Rating
Allmusic	3/5 stars

Letter to Home is the fortieth studio album by American singer/guitarist Glen Campbell, released in 1984 (see 1984 in music).

== Track listing ==
Side 1:

1. "I'll Be Faithful to You" (Paul Kennerley) – 2:34
2. "(Love Always) Letter to Home" (Carl Jackson) – 2:56
3. "Faithless Love" (JD Souther) – 3:17
4. "Leavin' Eyes" (Ted Hewitt) – 2:53
5. "Goodnight Lady" (Steve Nobels, Buddy Cannon) – 4:06

Side 2:

1. "After the Glitter Fades" (Stevie Nicks) – 2:45
2. "Tennessee " (Michael Smotherman) – 3:02
3. "A Lady Like You" (Jim Weatherly, Keith Stegall) – 3:32
4. "Scene of the Crime" (Jackson, T.J. Kuenster) – 3:20
5. "An American Trilogy" (Mickey Newbury) – 3:47

== Personnel ==
- Glen Campbell – vocals
- Eddie Bayers – drums
- Kenneth Bell – acoustic guitar
- David Briggs – keyboards
- Jerry Douglas – Dobro
- Sonny Garrish – steel guitar
- Carl Jackson – mandolin, banjo
- Shane Keister – keyboards, synthesizer
- Farrell Morris – percussion
- Rodger Morris – synthesizer
- Larry Paxton – bass guitar
- Brent Rowan – acoustic guitar, electric guitar
- Blaine Sprouse – fiddle
- Paul Worley – electric guitar
- Buddy Cannon – background vocals
- Emmylou Harris – background vocals
- Ted Hewitt – background vocals
- Carl Jackson – background vocals
- Joe Scaife – background vocals
- The "A" Strings – strings

Production

- Harold Shedd – producer
- Jim Cotton – engineer
- Joe Scaife – engineer
- Paul Goldberg – engineer
- George Clinton – engineer
- Bergen White – arranger
- Aaron Rapoport – photography

== Charts ==
=== Weekly charts ===
Chart (1984)	Peak position
US Top Country Albums (Billboard)	30

=== Year-end charts ===
Chart (1985)	Position
US Top Country Albums (Billboard)	45

=== Singles ===
Year	Single	Peak positions	
Year	Single	US Country	CAN Country
1984	"Faithless Love"	10	16
1984	"A Lady Like You"	4	—
1985	"(Love Always) Letter to Home"	14	—
