= Still Within the Sound of My Voice (song) =

Single by Glen Campbell

from the album Still Within the Sound of My Voice
- B-side: "In My Life"
- Released: September 21, 1987
- Genre: Country
- Length: 4:10
- Label: MCA
- Songwriter: Jimmy Webb
- Producers: Jimmy Bowen, Glen Campbell

Glen Campbell singles chronology
"The Hand That Rocks the Cradle" (1987)	"Still Within the Sound of My Voice" (1987)	"I Remember You" (1988)

"Still Within the Sound of My Voice" is a song written by Jimmy Webb and recorded by American country music artist Glen Campbell. It was released in September 1987 as the second single and title track from the album Still Within the Sound of My Voice. The song reached number 5 on Billboard Hot Country Singles & Tracks. Linda Ronstadt covered the song on her 1989 album Cry Like a Rainstorm, Howl Like the Wind.

== Chart performance ==
Chart (1987–1988)	Peak position
US Hot Country Songs (Billboard)	5
Canadian RPM Country Tracks	47
