= Old Home Town =

Studio album by Glen Campbell
- Released: September 1982
- Recorded: 1982
- Studio: Footprint Sound Studio, Sherman Oaks, California
- Genre: Country
- Label: Atlantic
- Producer: Jerry Fuller

Glen Campbell chronology
Glen Campbell Live (1981)	Old Home Town (1982)	Letter to Home (1984)

Professional ratings
Review scores
Source	Rating
Allmusic	3.5/5 stars

Old Home Town is the thirty-ninth album by American singer/guitarist Glen Campbell, released in 1982 (see 1982 in music). It was his first album released on Atlantic Records after twenty years with Capitol Records.

== Track listing ==
Side 1:

1. "Old Home Town" (David Pomeranz) – 3:38
2. "I Love How You Love Me" (Barry Mann, Larry Kolber) – 2:29
3. "Hang On Baby (Ease My Mind)" (Joe Rainey, Dan Rogers) – 2:28
4. "Blues (My Naughty Sweetie Gives To Me)" (Arthur N. Swanstone, Charles R. McCarron, Carey Morgan) – 2:30
5. "A Few Good Men" (Joe Rainey) – 3:05

Side 2:

1. "On the Wings of My Victory" (Bob Corbin) – 3:30
2. "I Was Too Busy Loving You" (Jimmy Webb) – 3:08
3. "Ruth" (Jud Strunk) – 2:57
4. "A Woman's Touch" (Jerry Fuller) – 3:12
5. "Mull of Kintyre" (Paul McCartney, Denny Laine) – 4:18

== Personnel ==
- Glen Campbell – vocals, acoustic guitar, bagpipes
- Kim Darigan – bass guitar, background vocals
- Craig Fall – acoustic guitars and electric guitars, background vocals
- Steve Hardin – keyboards, harmonica, background vocals
- Carl Jackson – acoustic guitar, fiddle, banjo, background vocals
- TJ Kuenster – keyboards, synthesizer, background vocals
- Steve Turner – drums, background vocals
- Larry Muhoberac – keyboards, background vocals
- Additional backing vocals – Chris Brosius, Jerry Fuller, Annette Fuller, Joey Scarbury, Joe Benzet, Terry Klein

== Production ==
- Producer – Jerry Fuller
- Engineer – Marc Piscitelle
- Recording - Marc Piscitelle, Linda Corbin
- String Arrangements – Larry Muhoberac
- Art Direction – Bob Defrin

== Chart performance ==
=== Album ===
Chart (1982)	Peak position
U.S. Billboard Top Country Albums	33

=== Singles ===
Year	Single	Peak positions	
Year	Single	US Country	US AC
1982	"Old Home Town"	44	—
1982	"I Love How You Love Me"	17	35
1983	"On the Wings of My Victory"	85	—
