= I Have You =

Single by Glen Campbell

from the album Still Within the Sound of My Voice
- B-side: "I'm a One-Woman Man"
- Released: May 28, 1988
- Genre: Country
- Length: 3:19
- Label: MCA
- Songwriters: Paul Nelson, Gene Nelson
- Producers: Jimmy Bowen, Glen Campbell

Glen Campbell singles chronology
"I Remember You" (1988)	"I Have You" (1988)	"Light Years" (1988)

"I Have You" is a song written by Paul and Gene Nelson, and recorded by American country music artist Glen Campbell. It was released in May 1988 as the fourth single from the album Still Within the Sound of My Voice. The song reached number 7 on the Billboard Hot Country Singles & Tracks chart.

== Charts ==
=== Weekly charts ===
Chart (1988)	Peak position
US Hot Country Songs (Billboard)	7
Canadian RPM Country Tracks	44

=== Year-end charts ===
Chart (1988)	Position
US Hot Country Songs (Billboard)	55

== Adaptation ==
"I Have You" was covered in a Cantonese version as "有著你" and recorded in the album 《長青歌集》 by George Lam. (1989)
