= Reunited with Jimmy Webb 1974–1988 =

Compilation album by Glen Campbell
- Released: 1999
- Genre: Country
- Label: Raven Records

Professional ratings
Review scores
Source	Rating
AllMusic	4/5 stars
No Depression	Positive

Reunited with Jimmy Webb 1974–1988 is a compilation album of Glen Campbell recordings of Jimmy Webb songs, released in 1999, by Raven Records. The album contains the complete album Reunion: The Songs of Jimmy Webb (1974) and the Webb compositions from Bloodline (1976), Southern Nights (1977), Highwayman (1979), It's the World Gone Crazy (1981), Still Within the Sound of My Voice (1987), and Light Years (1988).

== Track listing ==
All songs written by Jimmy Webb, except where indicated.

1. "Roll Me Easy" (Lowell George) – 2:41
2. "Just This One Time" – 3:46
3. "You Might as Well Smile" – 3:35
4. "Wishing Now" – 3:16
5. "About the Ocean" (Susan Webb) – 3:01
6. "Ocean in His Eyes" – 3:27
7. "The Moon's a Harsh Mistress" – 3:07
8. "I Keep It Hid" – 3:27
9. "Adoration" – 3:16
10. "It's a Sin" – 2:24
11. "Christian No" – 2:31
12. "Early Morning Song" – 3:30
13. "Highwayman" – 3:02
14. "Love Song" – 3:15
15. "In Cars" – 3:02
16. "Still Within the Sound of My Voice" – 4:08
17. "For Sure, for Certain, Forever, for Always" – 3:16
18. "Lightning in a Bottle" – 4:04
19. "If These Walls Could Speak" – 2:58
20. "More Than Enough" – 2:53
21. "Brand New Eyes" – 2:29
22. "Light Years" – 3:47
23. "Almost Alright Again" – 3:27
24. "Our Movie" – 3:33

== Production ==
- Producers – Jimmy Bowen, Dennis Lambert, Brian Potter, Gary Klein, Tom Thacker, Glen Campbell
- Collection compiled by Glenn A. Baker, John Dowler, Peter Shillito, Kevin Mueller
- Artwork – Greg Klein, Alan Duffy
- Photographs – The Glenn A. Baker Archives
- Made in Australia by Raven Records
