= Gentle on My Mind (1967 Glen Campbell album) =

Studio album by Glen Campbell
- Released: August 1967
- Recorded: May 17 – July 13, 1967
- Studio: Capitol (Hollywood)
- Genre: Country
- Length: 27:57
- Label: Capitol
- Producer: Al De Lory

Glen Campbell chronology
Burning Bridges (1967)	Gentle on My Mind (1967)	By the Time I Get to Phoenix (1967)

Singles from Gentle on My Mind
- 1. "Gentle on My Mind" Released: 1967

Professional ratings
Review scores
Source	Rating
AllMusic	4.5/5 stars

Gentle on My Mind is the sixth studio album by American singer-guitarist Glen Campbell, released in 1967 by Capitol Records.

== Background ==
The centerpiece of the album is "Gentle on My Mind". Campbell heard songwriter John Hartford's original version on the radio and fell in love with this song about memories of a lost love. At the time, Campbell was under contract with Capitol Records as a solo artist but had little success in establishing a name for himself in the public eye. Campbell gathered some of his fellow session players from the famous "Wrecking Crew" gang (which included Leon Russell credited as Russell Bridges) to come into the Capitol studio to record a demo version that he could pitch to his producer. Between phrases and stanzas, Campbell yelled instructions to the players. He then left the rough recording for his producer to listen to. His producer fell in love, not only with the song but with the recording itself. Without telling Campbell, he took the tape back into the studio and removed the unwanted verbiage from between the phrases. He then released the demo recording, which became a hit for Campbell when it was released.

Hartford’s inspiration for the song came from watching the film Dr. Zhivago. He would later remember, "I know watching the movie gave me a feeling that caused me to start writing, but as far as saying it came from that, I don't know. It just came from experience. While I was writing it, if I had any idea that it was going to be a hit, it probably would have come out differently and it wouldn't have been a hit. The song came real fast, in about 15 minutes. It was a blaze, a blur."

== Track listing ==
Side 1

1. "Gentle on My Mind" (John Hartford) – 2:56
2. "Catch the Wind" (Donovan Phillips Leitch) – 2:15
3. "It's Over" (Jimmie Rodgers) – 2:01
4. "Bowling Green" (Terry Slater, Jackie Ertel) – 2:18
5. "Just Another Man" (Glen Campbell, Joe Allison) – 2:10
6. "You're My World" (Umberto Bindi, Carl Sigman, Gino Paoli) – 2:33

Side 2

1. "The World I Used to Know " (Rod McKuen) – 2:23
2. "Without Her" (Harry Nilsson) – 2:13
3. "Mary in the Morning" (Mike Rashkow, Johnny Cymbal) – 3:01
4. "Love Me As Though There Were No Tomorrow" (Jimmy McHugh, Harold Adamson) – 2:39
5. "Cryin'" (Joe Melson, Roy Orbison) – 2:51

== Personnel ==
Music

- Glen Campbell – vocals, acoustic guitar
- James Burton – acoustic guitar, electric guitar
- Doug Dillard – banjo
- Joe Osborn – bass guitar
- Jim Gordon – drums
- Leon Russell (listed as Russell Bridges) – piano

Production

- Al De Lory – producer, arranger, conductor
- Leon Russell – arranger, conductor

== Charts ==
Album – Billboard (United States)

Chart	Entry date	Peak position
Billboard Country Albums	10/07/67	1(2)
Billboard 200	12/02/1967	5

Singles – Billboard (United States)

Year	Single	Hot Country Singles	Billboard Hot 100	Easy Listening
1967	"Gentle on My Mind"	30	62	-
1968	"Gentle on My Mind" re-release	-	39	8

== Awards ==
At the 9th Annual Grammy Awards in 1967, Campbell won two Grammy Awards in the categories Best Country & Western Recording and Best Country & Western Solo Vocal Performance, Male for "Gentle on My Mind". In 2008, "Gentle on My Mind" was inducted into the Grammy Hall of Fame.
