= Southern Nights (song) =

1975 song by Allen Toussaint

Single by Allen Toussaint

from the album Southern Nights
- B-side: "Out of the City"
- Released: May 1975
- Recorded: 1975
- Studio: Sea-Saint Studio, New Orleans
- Genre: New Orleans R&B
- Length: 3:35
- Label: Reprise
- Songwriter: Allen Toussaint
- Producers: Allen Touissaint, Marshall Sehorn

Allen Toussaint singles chronology
"Country John" (1975)	"Southern Nights" (1975)	"Happiness" (1978)

"Southern Nights"

Single by Glen Campbell

from the album Southern Nights
- B-side: "William Tell Overture"
- Released: January 17, 1977
- Recorded: October 2, 1976
- Studio: Capitol Studios, Hollywood, California
- Genre: Country pop; soft rock
- Length: 3:00
- Label: Capitol
- Songwriter: Allen Toussaint
- Producer: Gary Klein

Glen Campbell singles chronology
"See You On Sunday" (1976)	"Southern Nights" (1977)	"Sunflower" (1977)

"Southern Nights" is a song written and performed by American musician Allen Toussaint, from his 1975 album, Southern Nights, and later recorded by American country music singer Glen Campbell. It was the first single released from Campbell's 1977 album, Southern Nights, and reached No. 1 on three separate US charts.

== Song history ==
The lyrics of "Southern Nights" were inspired by childhood memories Allen Toussaint had of visiting relatives in the Louisiana backwoods, which often entailed storytelling under star-filled nighttime skies. When Campbell heard Toussaint's version, he immediately identified with the lyrics which reminded him of his own youth growing up on an Arkansas farm. In October 1976, Campbell recorded the song with slightly modified lyrics.

== Accolades ==
In 1977, "Southern Nights" song was nominated for Song of the Year by the Country Music Association.

== Chart performance ==
Released as a single by Campbell in January 1977, "Southern Nights" immediately caught on with both country and pop audiences. The song featured a unique guitar lick that Campbell had learned from friend Jerry Reed. In late March, "Southern Nights" spent two weeks at No. 1 on the Billboard magazine Hot Country Singles chart marking it Campbell's fifth and final No. 1 country hit.

In late April, the track reached No. 1 on the Billboard Hot 100 pop chart marking Campbell's second and last No. 1 pop hit.

The song also spent four weeks at No. 1 on the Hot Adult Contemporary chart marking Campbell's seventh hit on the chart.

== Charts ==
=== Weekly charts ===
Chart (1977)	Peak position
Australia (Kent Music Report)	36
Belgium (Ultratop 50 Flanders)	12
Belgium (Ultratop 50 Wallonia)	31
Canada Top Singles (RPM)	1
Canada Adult Contemporary (RPM)	1
Canada Country Singles (RPM)	2
Euro Hit 50	29
French Singles Chart	30
Ireland (IRMA)	3
Netherlands (Single Top 100)	15
New Zealand (Recorded Music NZ)	10
UK Singles (Official Charts)	28
US Billboard Hot 100	1
US Adult Contemporary (Billboard)	1
US Hot Country Songs (Billboard)	1
US Cash Box Top 100	1
West Germany (GfK)	18

=== Year-end charts ===
Chart (1977)	Rank
Canada Top Singles (RPM)	14
US Billboard Hot 100	22
US Adult Contemporary (Billboard)	5
US Hot Country Songs (Billboard)	8
US Cash Box Top 100	20

== Certifications ==
Region	Certification	Certified units/sales
Canada (Music Canada)	Gold	75,000^{^}
New Zealand (RMNZ)	Platinum	30,000^{‡}
United Kingdom (BPI)	Gold	400,000^{‡}
United States (RIAA)	Platinum	1,000,000^{‡}
^{^} Shipments figures based on certification alone.^{‡} Sales+streaming figures based on certification alone.

== In popular culture ==
The song is featured in the 1978 film Convoy and is featured in the film’s soundtrack.

The song is featured in the 2017 film Guardians of the Galaxy Vol. 2 and further included on the film's soundtrack album.
