= Chris Gantry =

American country musician (b. 1942)

- Born: Christopher Cedzich; December 29, 1942 (age 83); Queens, New York, US
- Genres: Country, outlaw country
- Occupation: Country music artist

Chris Gantry (born December 29, 1942) is an American country musician and songwriter known for his involvement in the outlaw country genre. Gantry is known for writing songs such as "Dreams of the Everyday Housewife."

== Discography ==
=== Studio albums ===
- Introspection (1968)
- Motor Mouth (1970)
- Gantry Rides Again (2015)
- At the House of Cash (recorded in 1973 and 1974, released in 2017)
- Nashlantis (2019)
- Worth Every Nail (2026)

=== Live albums ===
- Live at the Filming Station (2014)
