= Galveston (song) =

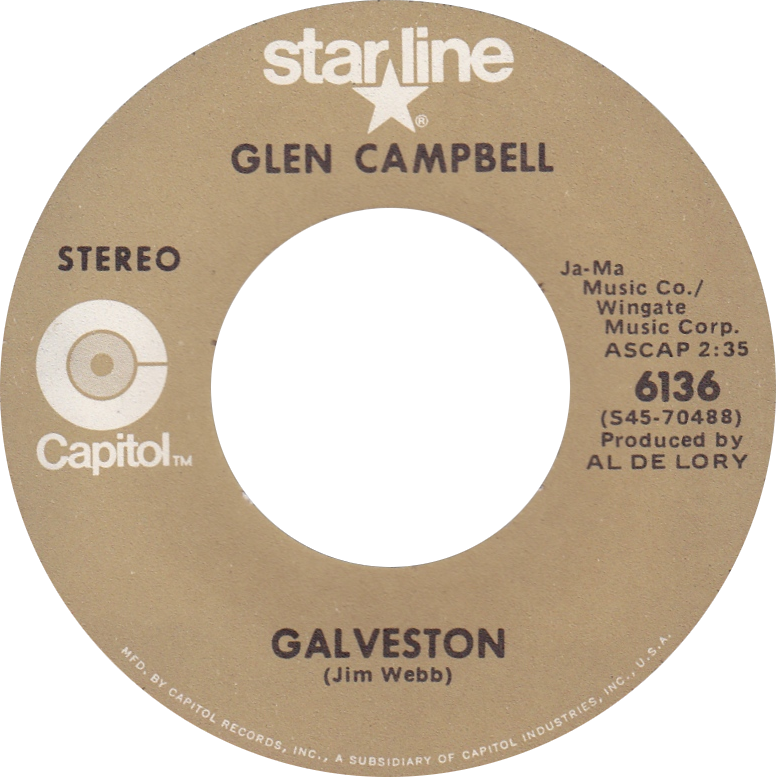
- One of US reissues

Single by Glen Campbell

from the album Galveston
- B-side: "How Come Every Time I Itch I Wind Up Scratchin' You"
- Released: February 24, 1969
- Recorded: November 27, 1968 and January 9, 1969; Capitol Studios, Hollywood, California
- Genre: Country pop; soft rock
- Length: 2:39
- Label: Capitol 2428
- Songwriter: Jimmy Webb
- Producer: Al De Lory

Glen Campbell singles chronology
"Wichita Lineman" (1968)	"Galveston" (1969)	"Where's the Playground Susie" (1969)

"Galveston" is a song written by Jimmy Webb and popularized by American country music singer Glen Campbell who recorded it with the instrumental backing of members of The Wrecking Crew. In 2003, this song ranked number 8 in CMT's 100 Greatest Songs in Country Music. Campbell's version, produced by Al De Lory, also went to number 1 on the country music charts. On other charts, "Galveston" went to number 4 on the Billboard Hot 100 and number one on the "Easy Listening" charts. It was certified gold by the RIAA in October 1969.

== Background and writing ==
The protagonist is a soldier waiting to go into battle who thinks of the woman he loves and his hometown of Galveston, Texas.

The song was first released in 1968 by a mournful-sounding Don Ho, who introduced Glen Campbell to it when Ho appeared as a guest on The Glen Campbell Goodtime Hour. Campbell's recording of the song, released in early 1969, was perceived by many (who listened carefully to the lyrics) as being a Vietnam War protest song, but Campbell performed it up-tempo. In his original promo video, Campbell was dressed as a soldier in a military-style outfit. Webb has challenged the implication of Campbell's version that it was in any way "a patriotic song". According to Webb, the song is "about a guy who's caught up in something he doesn't understand and would rather be somewhere else".

In Ho's recording, the second verse was:

Galveston, oh Galveston
Wonder if she could forget me
I'd go home if they would let me
Put down this gun
And go to Galveston.

However, in both Campbell's version and in Webb’s own 1972 album Letters (and his later performances), this verse was:

Galveston, oh Galveston
I still hear your sea waves crashing
While I watch the cannons flashing
I clean my gun
And dream of Galveston.

== Personnel ==
According to the AFM contract sheet, the following musicians appeared at the recording session.

- Al De Lory – session leader
- Bob Felts – contractor
- Joe Osborn
- Harry Hyams
- Armand Kaproff
- Jesse Ehrlich
- Arnold Belnick
- Assa Drori
- Tibor Zelig
- Ronald Folsom
- Joseph DiFiore
- William Kurasch
- Sid Sharp
- Ralph Schaeffer
- Leonard Malarsky
- Jack Redmond
- Gene Cipriano
- David Roberts
- Lew McCreary
- Roy Caton
- Ollie Mitchell
- Gene Estes
- Leon Russell

The original Capitol single's label (2428: 45-70488) also credits producer De Lory as the arranger and conductor.

== Other cover versions ==
Within a year of Campbell's hit version, Rolling Stone states, "recordings of 'Galveston' had sold six million copies, having been cut by 27 different artists, from fellow country star Faron Young to jazz great Dizzy Gillespie."

== Chart performance ==
=== Weekly charts ===
Chart (1969)	Peak position
Australian (Go-Set)	5
Canada Adult Contemporary (RPM)	1
Canada Country Singles (RPM)	1
Canada Top Singles (RPM)	2
Ireland (IRMA)	9
New Zealand (Listener)	3
UK (UK Singles Chart)	14
US Adult Contemporary (Billboard)	1
US Billboard Hot 100	4
US Hot Country Songs (Billboard)	1

=== Year-end charts ===
Chart (1969)	Rank
Australian Go-Set	11
Canadian RPM Top Singles	68
US Billboard Hot 100	59
US Cash Box	70
