= Pork. The Other White Meat =

1987 American advertising slogan

"Pork. The Other White Meat." was an advertising slogan developed by advertising agency Bozell, Jacobs, Kenyon & Eckhardt in 1987 for the National Pork Board. The campaign was paid for using a checkoff fee (tax) collected from the initial sale of all pigs and pork products, including imports. Medical researchers and the United States Department of Agriculture classify pork as red meat.

== Advertising campaign ==
The program's television ad campaign began on March 2, 1987, with a series of advertisements that pitched pork as a white meat alternative to chicken or turkey, offering entrees such as cordon bleu, kabobs and pork à l'orange. The $7 million budget contrasted to the $30 million spent primarily on network television ads for the "Beef. It's What's for Dinner" campaign from the National Cattlemen's Beef Association, and the $112 million spent on ads for branded chickens.

Print ads have encouraged consumers to rethink the way they prepare meals, including an ad written in the style of an obituary that depicts a woman who is mourning "the passing of her long-lived tuna chow mein casserole recipe", which will be replaced "by a new recipe for Orange Glazed Pork Tenderloin".

During Super Bowl XXIX, the National Pork Board unveiled the "Taste What's Next" campaign, set around restaurants serving pork by people including Emeril Lagasse.

In the fall of 1998, the National Pork Board promoted "The Other White Sale".

The last campaign using the slogan, which was first used in 2005, was "The Other White Meat. Don't be blah."

== Results ==
With a program promoting pork using the slogan as a lean meat to health-conscious consumers, pork sales in the United States rose 20%, reaching $30 billion annually by 1991.

Data collected by the USDA's Economic Research Service showed that pork consumption following the introduction of the Board's promotion programs had risen from 45.6 pounds (20.7 kg) per capita in 1987 to a peak of 49.3 pounds (22.4 kg) per capita in 1999, dropping to 48.5 pounds (22.0 kg) in 2003. By contrast, beef consumption had declined from 69.5 pounds (31.5 kg) per American in 1987 to 62 pounds (28 kg) in 2003.

== Replacement ==
On March 4, 2011, the National Pork Board replaced the slogan with a new one: "Pork. Be inspired."
