= Fat free lean index =

Measure of hog quality

The Fat free lean index is one of several measures of hog quality (in this case, leanness) that can be used in determining value. The index was developed by the National Pork Producers Council, an industry trade group.

== History ==
In 1990, approximately 25 percent of U.S. market hogs were purchased on a carcass merit system that differentiated price based on lean content. The differentials varied, and there was a scarcity of data to indicate whether the price spread was sufficient between good and poor quality pigs.

A checkoff-funded task force in 1990 recommended that procedures be established to determine value of pigs based on pounds of quality lean in the carcass.

In 1993, the National Pork Producers Council's (NPPC) Lean Value Task Force, funded by the National Pork Board (NPB) and in cooperation with the Pork Committee of the American Meat Institute, developed the Uniform Lean Information Project. In it, the Fat-Free Lean Index, (FFLI) was developed. The intent of the FFLI was to permit pork producers to compare the lean content of their pigs over time and with the pigs of other producers, even though each producer may be marketing to different processors using different technology to estimate carcass lean content. The original FFLI equations were based on carcass separation data collected in university trials from 1970 to 1985 from pigs weighing between 200 and 250 lb. Since then, pigs have been made leaner through genetic selection and market weights have increased greatly.
