= Hurricane recovery in North Carolina =

Dealing with effects of hurricanes in North Carolina

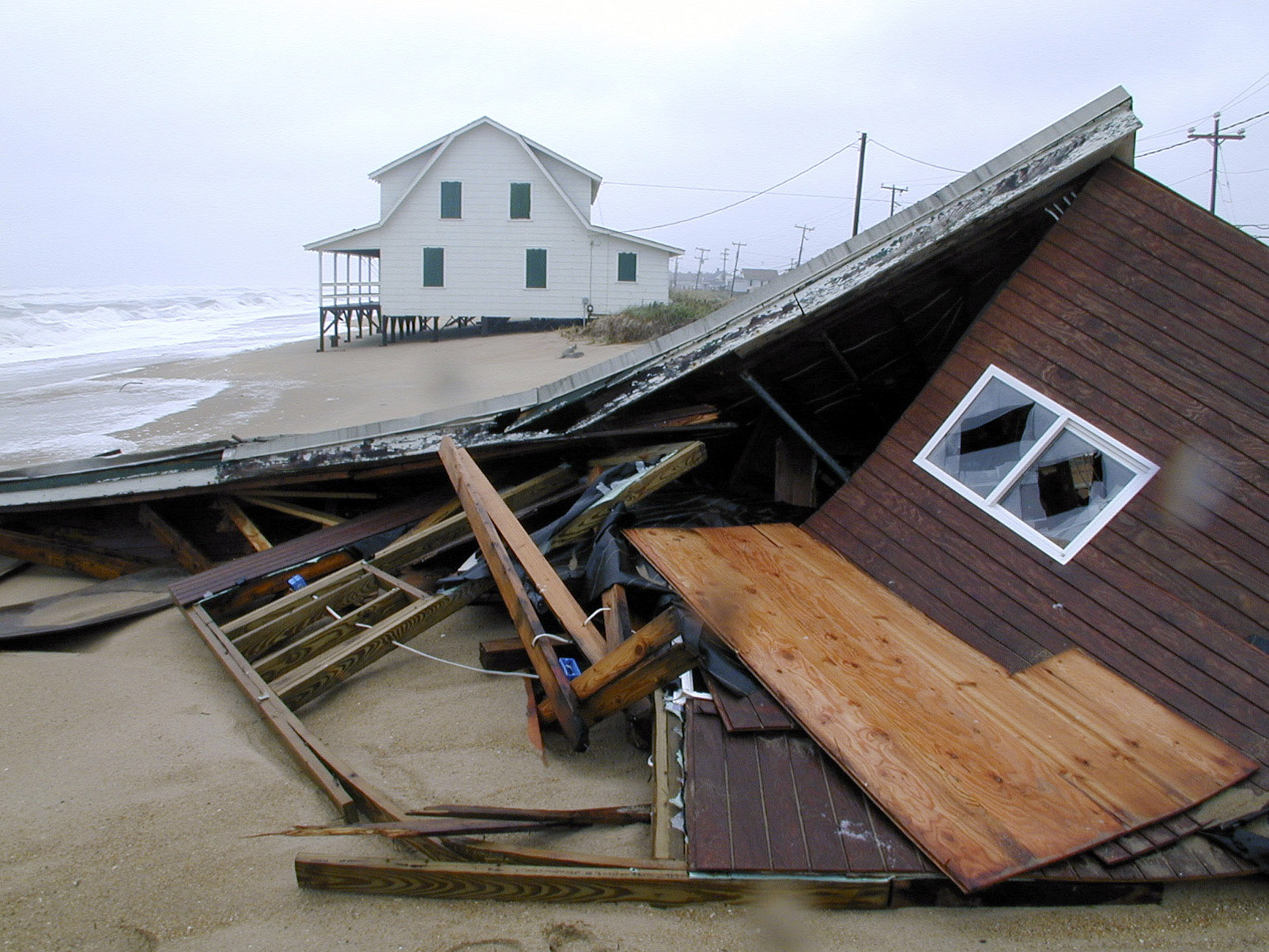
FEMA photo of a home destroyed by Hurricane Dennis as it passed over Kitty Hawk, North Carolina

Due to the common occurrence of hurricanes in the coastal state of North Carolina, hurricane recovery in North Carolina is a large component of the state's emergency management efforts. Recovery from these tremendous storms at the local and state level is a large part of the aftermath of a hurricane. Gavin Smith and Victor Flatt stated that "Disaster recovery remains the least understood aspect of hazards management, when assessed relative to preparedness, response, and hazard mitigation." Smith and Flatt also went on to state that the role of the states is even less understood. The review of the plans and policies that instruct recovery, agencies involved, funding processes and budgets, and the environmental effects of a hurricane creates a better understanding of how North Carolina recovers from a hurricane.

In recent decades, a growing coastal population has led to hurricanes affecting larger numbers of people and causing greater amounts of damage. North Carolina is no different. During the 1990s North Carolina experienced a number of record setting hurricanes as a result of the increasing population in the state's coastal region. Between 1960 and 1990, Dare County was the 12th fastest growing county on the Atlantic and Gulf coasts.

== Physical processes of a hurricane ==
Coastal storms cause a number of environmental impacts that must be addressed during the recovery process. According to Godschalk, Brower, and Beatley, coastal storms fall into two categories: hurricanes and all other coastal storms. This is because unlike other coastal storms, hurricanes attack with two additional destructive factors. All coastal storms affect the environment through flooding and erosion; but hurricanes provide the additional elements of extremely high winds and storm surge. Hurricane winds can range between 75-200 mph. Storm surges; caused by the decreasing ocean depth paired with strong onshore winds and extremely low barometric pressure associated with a hurricane, span 40–50 miles across, rising 4–20 feet above sea level.

North Carolina's shoreline provides natural protection against hurricanes. The state is lined with barrier islands which act as a natural buffer against storm surge. These islands, which were formed from sediment deposited during the last ice age, have been migrating landward since their creation. During a hurricane, these islands flatten out and/or form sand bars to protect itself from the storm's forces. Construction of hard beach structures in coastal areas interferes with these natural geological and ecological processes.

Hurricanes cause large amounts of organic matter to be washed into rivers and their tributaries. The decomposition of this material utilizes oxygen that is normally present in the water column. This scenario leads to periods of hypoxia, which is when there are low levels of dissolved oxygen. There are also issues with salinity caused by storm surge and areas that receive rapid intense precipitation. North Carolina experienced problems with both hypoxia and salinity when Hurricane Isabel struck the state in 2003.

There is also an effect on inland vegetation, agricultural, and livestock when a hurricane makes landfall. The high velocity winds of the storm can defoliate forest and wetlands. This affects the amount of light reaching the lower levels of the forest, the forest temperature, and localized humidity. This in turn affects the food available to primary species in the ecosystem. The lack of upper level foliage can also result in the destruction of breeding grounds for certain bird species and a lack of nesting area for migratory bird species. As Hurricane Hugo passed of the Carolinas, if destroyed up to 75% of the upper woody biomass in some forest. In one forest, as a direct effect of the lack of nesting trees, it was recorded that up to 67% of the endangered red-cockaded woodpeckers died. High winds and periods of intense rainfall can directly damage planted seeds, crops growing in fields, and erode away soil. There are also long-term effects as a result of a lack of soil fertility because of nutrient leaching. North Carolina has experienced severe environmental complications associated with hog farming on several occasions.

== Plans and policies ==
=== State level ===
In the event of a hurricane, the state of North Carolina provides services to assist in recovery. Types of assistance include "formulation of state policy, coordination of assistance, and the provision of training, education, and outreach programs." The Policies for Guiding Planning for Post-Disaster Recovery and Reconstruction noted that a Post-Disaster Recovery/ Reconstruction Plan should come from the four plans including; Comprehensive plan, Emergency Operations Plan, Capital Improvement Plan, and Mitigation Plan.

State and local agencies are requested to follow the North Carolina Emergency Operations Plan (NCEOP) under the authority of the NC Executive Order No.39. The NCEOP is a comprehensive framework of policy intended for the use of state and local authorities. The CEOP covers emergency operations including recovery. It is North Carolina's intention that this plan goes along with the objectives of the National Incident Management System (NIMS) which includes recovery management strategies from the federal to county level, also known as intergovernmental management of a disaster. The NCEOP understands that the success of recovery depends on the collaboration of agencies and organizations involved. This state plan was a coordinated effort to better ensure each organization knew the part they would need to play during the time of a hurricane. In the first appendix of the plan there is an outline dedicated to the proposed recovery actions that should take place. The first step was noted to begin determining the need for volunteers, goods, and services. The remaining notions reiterated the need to establish and maintain coordination of efforts from state and local governments. The recovery actions are broken down into four main topics; Risk Assessment and Planning, Grant Management, Buyout Legal Team, and National Flood Insurance Program. Detailed instructions of what agencies are responsible for what in terms of recovery are listed in the plan. The topics covered include; energy, fire, search and rescue, hazardous materials, law enforcement, disaster medical services, mass care and human services, public health, and animal protection. Specific to the event of a hurricane, the NCEOP contains an appendix for recovery. The details within the hurricane section note the agencies that need to be involved and time frames for their response to assist. According to the NCEOP recovery from a hurricane can begin three days prior to landfall. The section breaks tasks down by checklist from three days out to a week after the hurricane strikes.

The North Carolina Disaster Recovery Guide covers the agencies and programs that are involved at the state level in disaster recovery. The information provided includes eligibility for assistance and contact information. The guide goes into further detail for recovery action dealing with the topics of; agriculture, business and workforce, communications and outreach, environment, finance, health and human services, housing, intergovernmental relations, risk management, transportation and infrastructure, and volunteers and donations.

=== County level ===
Plans and policy directed to the county level vary in amount of authority and detail. The NC League of Municipalities and the NC Association of County Commissioners provide a basic series of questions and things to do as a leader assisting with recovery of a North Carolina hurricane. On the website ReadyNCLocal.org Hurricane Planning importance is placed on safety and communication between employees assisting with recovery.

Another example of a basic policy at the county level is the Hurricane Recovery Checklist for local governments. The North Carolina Department of Environment and Natural Resources provide a Hurricane Recovery Checklist for local governments. The checklist is broken down into recovery need, proposed activity, requirements, and what to do. North Carolina counties that are greatly impacted by hurricanes are coastal counties. The coastal counties under the Coastal Area Management Act (CAMA) require general or major development permits to complete certain recovery activities. The installation or removal along the beach require approval from CAMA and the United States Army Corps of Engineers.

Planning at the county level can include the creation and implementation of hurricane plans. These hurricane plans may also include recovery plans or policy. The county of New Hanover has a Hurricane Mitigation and Reconstruction Plan. This plan covers the task force responsibilities, tree chart for the days of recovery, and the policies specific to hurricane recovery. A responsibility of the task force is to manage the initiation and ending of levels of moratoriums along the tree chart starting at day 0 to day 32. This plan placed major focus on building and structure damage followed by regulation of issuing permits. The policies noted in the plan include plan for; cleanup, reconstruction, building moratorium, purchasing unbuildable land, assistance to coordinate and maintain information on assistance programs at federal, state, and local level.

The North Carolina Emergency Managers Association compiled the contact information for emergency managers of North Carolina counties as well as the websites for the county's emergency management that would contain the hurricane plan and hurricane recovery plan if the county publicized one. This information is found on their website North Carolina Emergency Managers Association

== Recovery agencies ==
The agencies responsible for hurricane recovery in North Carolina will be discussed in this section. Many different agencies have contributed to help rebuild North Carolina after damaging hurricanes. Private corporations have contributed money along with federal organizations. The latest severe hurricane to strike North Carolina was Hurricane Irene in 2011. Hurricane Irene caused an estimated 71 million dollars' worth of damage; and this estimate did not include the agricultural losses. After Hurricane Irene seven counties qualified for federal aid. These counties included Beaufort, Carteret, Craven, Dare, Hyde, Pamlico, and Tyrrell. The Federal Emergency Management Agency (FEMA) began providing relief to North Carolina however their budget was only $800 million. FEMA worked with local communities to help residents who needed to find shelter, and provided financial assistance. Disaster Unemployment assistance helped residents find jobs if they were out of work due to Hurricane Irene. FEMA also helped provide North Carolina with assistance to clean up debris in the aftermath. Major agencies as well as private contributed to recovery in North Carolina.

=== Federal agencies ===
Agriculture Agencies that provide recovery includes the USDA Farm Service Agency (FSA). These programs are all under the USDA Farm Service Agency the Crop Disaster Program (CDP), Emergency Loan Program, Non-insured Crop Disaster Assistance Program (NAP), Emergency Conservation Program (ECP), Dairy Disaster Assistance Program (DDAP), Tree Assistance Program (TAP), Livestock Assistance Program (LAP), Livestock Indemnity Program (LIP), Feed Indemnity Program (FIP), and American Indian Livestock Feed Program (AILFP)

Business and Workforce agencies that provide recovery include US Small Business Administration (SBA) which provides North Carolina disaster loans. The US Department of Labor and Employment and Training Administration (US DOLETA) provides National Emergency Grants (NEG). The US Department of Commerce and National Oceanic and Atmospheric Administration (NOAA) provides relief for North Carolina fisheries.

Environment Agencies that provide recovery include USDA Natural Resources Conservation Service (NRCS), Emergency Watershed Protection (EWP) that provide North Carolina stream clearance after hurricanes. The USDA Rural Development provides disaster water and waste loans and grants. The USDA Forest Service provides the Cooperative forest management grants program. The US Army Corps of Engineers provides beach re-nourishment and inlet stabilization and breach closure for North Carolina after hurricanes.

Health and Human Services that provide recovery for North Carolina after a hurricane include US Department of Homeland Security (DHS) and Federal Emergency Management Agency (FEMA). These agencies provide a crisis counseling program. The USDA Food and Nutrition Services (FNS) provides food stamps for North Carolina residents. The US HHS Administration on Aging provides relief for the elderly in North Carolina who need assistance following a hurricane.

Agencies that provide recovery for housing include US FEMA programs. Programs under FEMA for housing that provide relief for North Carolina following a hurricane include Individual Assistance (IA), Individuals and Households Program (IHP), Hazard Mitigation Grant Program (HMGP) and Pre-disaster Mitigation Program (PDM). The mitigation programs improves housing and buildings to help prevent damage following another hurricane in North Carolina. Other programs that also contribute to North Carolina housing after a hurricane are Flood Mitigation Assistance (FMA) and US Department Housing and Urban Development (HUD) that provides community development block grants. The US SBA provides SBA disaster loans. The USDA Rural Development Office provides Multifamily Housing repair loan/grant programs, Single Family Housing repair loan/grant programs, and Community Facilities Assistance for North Carolina.

Agencies that provide relief for intergovernmental include FEMA that provides public assistance for North Carolina residents following a hurricane.

Agencies that provide relief for Transportation and Infrastructure include in North Carolina include the US Department of Transportation and the Federal Highway Administration. These agencies help repair North Carolina roads after being damaged from a hurricane.

=== State agencies ===
State agencies that provide relief for agriculture loss following a hurricane include North Carolina Department of Agriculture and Consumer Services. This agency provides relief for farm equipment loss, crop loss, and provides grants and loans to fisherman. Another agency that assists is NC Cooperative Extension.

State agencies that provide relief for the Business and Workforce in North Carolina are NC Small Business and Technology Development Center, NC Department of Commerce, NC Workforce Development Commission, NC Department of Commerce, Employment Security Commission of NC and NC DENR Division of Marine Fisheries. These agencies provides disaster loans, national emergency grants, disaster unemployment assistance, business counseling, and relief for commercial fisherman in North Carolina following a hurricane.

State agencies that provide relief for the North Carolina environment include NC Division of Emergency Management, NC Department of Environment and Natural Resources (DENR), NC DENR Division of Waste Management, NC DENR Division of Forest Resources, and NC DENR Division of Coastal Management. These agencies provide Forestland Restoration, Drinking Water Protection, Solid and Hazardous Waste Cleanup, Underground Storage Tank Assessment, Water Quality Monitoring, Disaster Water and Waste Loans and Grants, Cooperative Forest Management Grants Program, Beach Renourishment and Inlet Stabilization or Breach Closure.

State Agencies that provide relief for health and human services of North Carolina following a hurricane include NC Department of Health and Human Services (DHHS), Division of Medical Assistance (DMA), NC DHHS Division of Social Services (DSS), NC DHHS DAAS, NC DHHS Division of Mental Health, Developmental Disabilities, and Substance Abuse Services (DMH/DD/SAS). These agencies provide crisis counseling programs, food stamps, unmet needs for the elderly, medicaid, relief for children, special needs.

State agencies that provides relief for North Carolina housing after a hurricane include NC Department of Crime Control and Public Safety, Division of Emergency Management (NCEM), North Carolina Housing Finance Agency (NCHFA), NC Division of Emergency Management, NC Department of Commerce, Division of Community Assistance (DCA). These agencies help and give relief by community level block grants, SBA disaster loans, Urgent Repair Program (URP), Single-Family Rehabilitation, Disaster Rental Assistance, Rental Production Program (RPP), Multifamily Housing repair loan/grant, Single Family Housing repair loan/grant programs, Community Facilities, Assistance, Crisis Housing Assistance Funds (CHAF), State Acquisition and Relocation Funds (SARF), Private Roads and Bridges assistance.

State Agencies that provide relief for Intergovernmental assistance in North Carolina include NC League of Municipalities and NC Association of County Commissioners. These agencies provide public and mutual aid assistance.

State agencies that provide relief for North Carolina transportation and infrastructure include NC Department of Transportation (NCDOT), NCEM. They provide emergency relief and public assistance for transportation and infrastructure in North Carolina.

=== Private and local agencies ===
There are not certain private and local agencies that are required to provide relief when a hurricane occurs in North Carolina. Their assistance is however always helpful in post-disaster recovery. Many different private and local agencies throughout the history of North Carolina have provided contributions however there are different agencies with each different hurricane disaster.

== Funding for disaster recovery ==
Hurricane Fran hit the heart of North Carolina in 1996. Half a million tourists and residents rushed inland as Fran took aim at the coast and then forced its way toward the Triangle. Landfall came near Bald Head Island, with winds of 115 mph and a storm surge between 8 and 12 feet. Damage from Fran was so widespread that a state of emergency was declared in all of North Carolina's 100 counties – the first time in state history. Damage was pegged at $2.3 billion, and 24 people died making this the second worst Hurricane to make landfall in North Carolina.

Federal outlays, Hurricane Fran, North Carolina, through August 26, 1997:

- FEMA individual assistance:
  - 25,188 applicants received $39.3 million in Disaster Housing Payments
  - 10,911 applicants received $23.3 million in Individual and Family Grants
  - 1,527 applicants received $0.6 million in Unemployment payments
- FEMA public assistance projects: 4,088 applicants received $211.6 million
- FEMA Hazard Mitigation Grants: 7 communities received $23.4 million
- FEMA transfers to other agencies (including Army Corps of Engineers): $211 million provided
- SBA Disaster Loans: 5,673 applicants received $108.6 million
- National Flood Insurance payments: 6,610 applicants received $126.9 million
- U.S. Department of Agricultural Emergency Conservation Program: 14.7 million received
- The USDA Natural Resources Conservation Service: $25.1 million received
- U.S. Department of Transportation: $17.7 million received
- U.S. Department of Housing and Urban Development: $35.7 million received

Approximate total of federal outlays: $837.9 million

North Carolina's most devastating storm was named Hurricane Floyd. A Tropical Storm, Dennis, softened North Carolina by coming ashore 10 days earlier than Floyd, saturating the soil and filling the rivers. When Floyd made landfall near Wilmington in 1999, its seemingly endless rains had nowhere to go but into the streets, highways and houses. Rain fell for more than 60 hours in some places. Floyd became North Carolina's biggest killer of the 20th century, claiming 52 lives. Many victims died in their cars, trying to navigate flooded roads, while others perished in their homes, caught off guard by flooding. Water pollution was rampant as floodwater's covered 4.2 million acres and caused staggering farm and livestock losses. More than 30,000 hogs drowned in the storm. Overall damage estimates from the storm totaled roughly $6 billion.

Under Governor Jim Hunt's leadership, the North Carolina General Assembly approved $836 million for the victims of Hurricane Floyd - the largest state-funded disaster relief package ever in U.S. history. Funds obligated so far include:

- Emergency assistance: More than $25.8 million was spent by FEMA for immediate disaster relief work by other agencies, such as rescue efforts, sheltering, supplying water, ice, generators, plastic sheeting and other emergency materials.
- More than $48 million was spent by FEMA to house displaced flood survivors in 2,535 travel trailers or manufactured homes.
- Special grants of $92.1 million were provided to 23,873 households which were uninsured, had serious unmet disaster-related needs and did not qualify for loans.
- $234.9 million for housing losses and counselors to help victims take advantage of state aid programs;
- $18.2 million for businesses impacted by the storm;
- $64 million for crop and livestock losses,
- $7.1 million for farm structures and equipment
- $1.5 million for Emergency Conservation Program buydowns
- $4.4 million in aid to commercial fishing,
- $2.8 million in aid to local governments for property tax losses
- More than $133.1 million was obligated for federal/state reimbursement on a 75-25 cost share basis for the repair, rebuilding or replacement of publicly owned or essential facilities.
- $232 million in state money to match funds from federal sources.
- Unemployment assistance payments of $5.5 million were approved for 6,200 applicants who became unemployed or suffered loss of earned income due to the disaster.

The most recent hurricane to devastate North Carolina was Hurricane Irene. As of August 31, 2011 President Barack Obama has issued, under his major disaster declaration for the State of North Carolina, a few key federal disaster aid programs that can be made available as needed and warranted.

- Rental payment for temporary housing if the place of residence is unlivable. Two months of initial assistance is provided and further assistance is available upon application.
- Grants are available for home repairs and replacement of household items not covered by insurance to make damaged homes sanitary, safe and functional.
- Grants to replace personal property and help meet dental, funeral, medical, transportation and other disaster related needs not covered by insurance or other federal, state and charitable aid programs.
- Unemployment payments for up to 26 weeks from the date of the disaster declaration for workers who temporarily lost jobs due to the disaster and are not qualified for state benefits, such as self-employed individuals.
- Low-interest loans to cover residential losses not fully compensated by insurance. Loans available up to $200,000 for primary residence; $40,000 for personal property, including rental losses. Loans available up to $2 million for business property losses not fully compensated for by insurance.
- Loans for up to $2 million for small business, small agricultural cooperatives and most private, non-profit organizations of all sizes that have suffered disaster related cash flow problems and need funds for working capital to recover from the disaster's adverse economic impact. This loan in combination with a property loss loan cannot exceed $2 million total.
- Loans of up to $500,000 for farmers, ranchers and aquaculture operators to cover production and property losses, excluding primary residence.
- Crisis counseling for traumatized victims.
- Income tax assistance for filing casualty losses.

== Environmental impact and recovery ==
North Carolina is one of the more progressive states when it comes to addressing hurricane related land-use issues. This is probably because the state has received the second-highest total of direct hurricane strikes in the US. North Carolina pairs strong regional coastal management with intelligent hazard mitigation efforts to create an effective statewide emergency management program. It is important to initiate these actions during the recovery phase of a disaster in order to prevent repeat tragedies and wasted tax dollars. These mitigation efforts paired with restrictions on hard beach structures protect the natural ability of a coastal region to maintain itself, and protects future coastal developments. As a result of the federally mandated Coastal Zone Management Program, North Carolina passed CAMA, both of which produced a number of hurricane mitigation efforts in North Carolina. The Albemarle-Pamilico watershed is part of the National Estuary Program. CAMA requires a review and approval by an appropriate government body for areas designated as "Areas of Environment Concern" (AEC). These include estuarine areas and ocean hazard areas. Within the ocean hazard areas category of AECs are ocean erodible zones, high hazard flood areas, and inlet hazard areas. Each of these zones have general regulations that establish setbacks, erosion control projects, dune stabilization, and prevents all development in some areas. North Carolina requires a setback for all "major structures" of 60 times the annual erosion rate and prohibits construction of seawalls and other permanent protective structures.

In regards to hurricane recovery this is a promising step because it reduces the need for costly beach maintenance. It has been shown that hard beach structures provide little protection during a storm and does not reduce the ensuing flood levels. Beach maintenance efforts, such as beach nourishment, are especially expensive and are subject to persistent maintenance. New Hanover County estimates it would cost $5.2 million to replace all the sand it loses annually. One method of hurricane recovery that addresses this problem is acquisition of vacant land and land that was developed prior to a storm, but has proven to be unsuitable for development. There are several types of land acquisition methods available in North Carolina. Obtaining land fee-simple means purchasing land and all rights associated with that particular parcel. Less-than-fee-simple acquisition is obtaining only the development rights to a piece of property, but has relatively the same effect.

== See also ==
- Disaster relief
- North Carolina Department of Environment and Natural Resources
- Hurricane Irene
- Hurricane Floyd
- Hurricane Fran
