= National Cattlemen's Beef Association =

Advocacy group for the cattle industry's policies

- Founded: 1898; 128 years ago
- Tax ID no.: 84-0738973
- Legal status: 501(c)(6) trade association
- Headquarters: 8900 Liberty Circle; Suite 400; Englewood, Colorado 80112; United States
- Coordinates: 39.570709°N 104.882381°W
- President: Mark Eisele
- Chief Executive Officer: Colin Woodall
- Subsidiaries: National Cattlemen's Building Corporation, CATL Fund, National Cattlemen's Foundation Inc, National Cattlemen's Association PAC
- Revenue: $61,550,112 (2015)
- Expenses: $59,995,602 (2015)
- Employees: 157 (2014)
- Volunteers: 282 (2014)
- Website: www.ncba.org

National Cattlemen's Beef Association (NCBA) is an American trade association and lobbying group working for American beef producers.

== Advertising campaign ==
National Cattlemen's Beef Association is the group responsible for the ad campaign run in the U.S. using the slogan "Beef. It's What's for Dinner". Music from the ballet Rodeo by Aaron Copland is used in the radio and television commercials. On January 21, 2008, Matthew McConaughey became the spokesman of the organization, having taken over from Sam Elliott and the late Jim Davis and Robert Mitchum. The Dinner ad replaced Beef. Real food for real people. James Garner was spokesman until he underwent quintuple heart bypass surgery.

The NCBA has a history of funding and promoting research and content that downplays the link between animal agriculture and climate change. As early as 1989, the NCBA developed strategic goals to "inform the public about the positive environmental contributions and practices of the cattle industry," including commissioning "position papers on key issues" and "establishing communication between ... leadership of appropriate national environmental organizations." In 2021, the NCBA made false claims about the impact of beef consumption on climate change. The NCBA has disputed that the beef industry contributes to climate change and has even claimed that the beef industry has a beneficial impact on climate change. The NCBA has lobbied against climate and environmental regulations.

== Beef Checkoff Assessment ==
National Cattlemen's Beef Association is funded by membership dues and sponsorships. NCBA also serves as a contractor to the Beef Checkoff on a cost recovery basis. The Beef Checkoff program was established as part of the 1985 Farm Bill. The checkoff assesses $1 per head on the sale of live domestic and imported cattle, in addition to a comparable assessment on imported beef and beef products. The checkoff assessment became mandatory when the program was approved by 79 percent of producers in a 1988 national referendum vote.

== Events ==
It hosts the Cattle Industry Annual Convention & NCBA Trade Show, the Cattle Industry Summer business Meeting, and multiple other events throughout the year. NCBA also producers the television show Cattlemen to Cattlemen.

== Legislation ==
National Cattlemen's Beef Association supported the Farmers Undertake Environmental Land Stewardship Act, a bill that would require the Environmental Protection Agency to modify the Spill Prevention, Control, and Countermeasure rule, which regulates oil discharges into navigable waters and adjoining shorelines. The rule requires certain farmers to develop an oil spill prevention plan that is certified by a professional engineer and may require them to make infrastructure changes. According to supporters, the bill would "ease the burden placed on farmers and ranchers" by making it easier for smaller farms to self-certify and raising the level of storage capacity under which farms are exempted. National Cattlemen's Beef Association's president said that they were "pleased" that the "bill will keep many of our producers from having to undertake excess costs as a result of the Environmental Protection Agency's overregulation."

In 2013, National Cattlemen's Beef Association supported the Water Rights Protection Act, a bill that would have prevented federal agencies from requiring certain entities to relinquish their water rights to the United States to use public lands.

In 1996, cattle prices decreased substantially, and National Cattlemen's Beef Association lobbied the US federal government for assistance.

== See also ==
- Canadian Cattlemen's Association
- Got Milk?
- Ohio Cattlemen's Association
- Wise Use Movement
