= William Hamilton Stepp =

American country blues fiddle player (1875–1957)

- Image taken by Alan Lomax in 1937

Background information
- Also known as: W.H. Stepp, Bill Stepp
- Born: April 11, 1875; Beattyville, Kentucky, U.S.
- Died: November 13, 1957 (aged 82) Knox County, Indiana, U.S.
- Genres: Fiddle music
- Occupation: Musician

William Hamilton Stepp (April 11, 1875 – November 13, 1957) was an American old-time fiddle player. In 1937, Stepp recorded for Alan Lomax and the Library of Congress, with his best-known tune being "Bonaparte's Retreat".

== Early life ==
Stepp was born the youngest of three illegitimate children in Beattyville, Kentucky, in April 1875. His father William Taylor Seale was a prominent leader of the county who did not recognize the offspring's existence, while Stepp's mother, Lucinda Stepp, was a half-Native American living in poverty. In 1880, Stepp's mother and sister were arrested for prostitution. Following the arrests, Stepp was adopted by Asa Smyth, as his family could no longer care for him. Around the same time, he began practicing the fiddle.

== Career ==
In the 1890s, Stepp relocated to Magoffin County and began performing at dance halls and town get-to-togethers. In addition to his music career, Stepp rafted logs, and often traveled without notice to his family for several weeks to perform and explore the region. Among the areas he regularly visited was Lakesville, where Stepp played for the farmers and sharecroppers who bargained their crops. In the book The Beautiful Music All Around Us: Field Recordings and the American Experience writer Stephen Wade wrote that

More than hundred people -- a sizable gathering for that time -- from throughout the region came to dance to his fiddle. As Bill played from his back porch Congleton's house, the guests 'ran figures' along the wide, flat yard that lay behind the house. For some numbers he joined them himself, standing up to clog while he continued to draw his bow.

In October 1937, Alan Lomax recorded seventeen songs by Stepp for the Library of Congress. On three tracks, he was accompanied by multi-instrumentalist Mae Porter Puckett, who Stepp was associated with through Puckett's marriage to his cousin. Among the compositions, "Bonaparte's Retreat" became Stepp's best-known, with it marked by his low-string playing and strained pronunciation. The recordings were archived under the name W. H. Stepp. Most of Stepp's recordings later appeared on the compilation albums American Fiddler Tunes and The Music of Kentucky, Volume 1.

== Personal life ==
Bill's first wife was Cornelia Moe, who he married in 1896.

Though Stepp continued to perform, he abandoned his family to move to Knox County, Indiana where he died in 1957.

== Legacy ==
- His song "Bonaparte's Retreat" was admitted into the National Recording Registry in 2016, along with 24 other recordings.
- Stepp's version of the song was used as a major component of Aaron Copland's song "Hoe-Down" from the ballet Rodeo. "Hoe-Down" has in turn been covered by various artists, including Emerson, Lake and Palmer on their 1972 album Trilogy. It has also received use in television and film, including the American TV ad campaign "Beef. It's What's For Dinner".
