= Real Christmas Tree Board =

US Christmas tree industry promotion board

The Real Christmas Tree Board is a U.S. organization established by federal law through a commodity checkoff program. The board was created when the Christmas Tree Promotion, Research, and Information Order was signed into law as part of the 2014 U.S. Farm Bill.

== History ==
The Christmas Tree Promotion Board was officially established by law when the Agricultural Act of 2014 was signed by President Barack Obama on February 7, 2014. The board is part of the Christmas tree checkoff program established by a provision of Agricultural Act of 2014 known as the Christmas Tree Promotion, Research, and Information Order. The Christmas Tree Promotion, Research, and Information Order is a U.S. Department of Agriculture rule that was originally published in November 2011 and established a commodity checkoff program to help U.S. Christmas tree growers. The rule was rescinded in 2011 after it attracted criticism and political controversy before becoming law in 2014.

The organization renamed from the Christmas Tree Promotion Board to the Real Christmas Tree Board in 2022.

== Membership ==
The board has 12 members, 11 producers and one Christmas tree importer. The producers are from different tree-producing geographic regions of the United States; five members are from the western region, two from the central region, and four from the eastern region. When the board was established initial members were appointed for terms of two, three or four years upon approval by the U.S. Secretary of Agriculture. The terms were assigned in this manner in order to stagger future terms on the board. Board members after the initial members serve terms of three years. In order to qualify for membership on the Christmas Tree Promotion Board producers and importers must have cut and sold 500 or more trees per year. The USDA began seeking nominations to the first iteration of the Christmas Tree Promotion Board in April 2014.

== Funding ==
The board is funded through an assessment of $.15 per tree on growers and importers of fresh-cut Christmas trees. Though the assessment amount can be increased it cannot exceed $.20 per tree and it can never be raised more than $.02 during a fiscal year. Growers and importers that produce or import less than 500 trees are exempted from the fee.
