= Bonaparte's Retreat =

American folk song

"Bonaparte's Retreat" is the title of several related songs. Although there are several different fiddle tunes titled "Bonaparte's Retreat," the one that is most common is an American old-time tune dating back to at least the late 1800s and probably well before that. In 1950, American country music artist Pee Wee King recorded a modified version of that tune, with lyrics added, which he also called "Bonaparte's Retreat". King's version has since been covered by many country artists.

== Traditional versions ==
"Bonaparte's Retreat" (sometimes called "Boneyparte's Retreat" or "Boney's Retreat") is the name of several fiddle tunes, most of them found in the old-time tradition (the Traditional Tune Archive at tunearch.org lists 8 separate tunes under the name "Bonaparte's Retreat"). The title "Bonaparte's Retreat" is a reference to Napoleon Bonaparte's disastrous retreat from Russia in 1812, which cost the French ruler most of his Grand Armée and eventually led to his downfall. Some 19th-century British folk songs celebrated the event, since it ended the longtime danger that Napoleon would try to invade England.

The first audio recording of Bonaparte's Retreat was made by Georgia fiddler A. A. Gray in 1924. In 1937, American ethnomusicologist Alan Lomax, while travelling through Kentucky, recorded fiddler William Hamilton Stepp playing "Bonaparte's Retreat". This recording became a touchstone in American culture, and was inducted in 2016 into the Library of Congress's National Recording Registry. Ruth Crawford Seeger transcribed it for John and Alan Lomax’s book Our Singing Country in 1941, and most fiddlers in the modern day who play Bonaparte's Retreat play the version recorded by W.H. Stepp.

Stepp's version of the song was used as a major component of Aaron Copland's orchestral composition "Hoe-Down" from the ballet Rodeo. Copland most likely learned it from the transcription found in the Lomaxes' book Our Singing Country. "Hoe-Down" has in turn been covered by various artists, including Emerson, Lake and Palmer on their 1972 album Trilogy. It has also received use in television and film, including the American TV ad campaign "Beef. It's What's For Dinner".

Famous versions of "Bonaparte's Retreat" include several recordings by Doc Watson (often with others), a recording by Ola Belle Reed (off her album Rising Sun Melodies), and more recently, a recording by Tyler Childers (off his album Long Violent History).

== "Bonaparte's Retreat" (Pee Wee King song) ==
"Bonaparte's Retreat"

Single by Glen Campbell

from the album Houston (I'm Comin' to See You)
- B-side: "Too Many Mornings"
- Released: July 15, 1974
- Genre: Country
- Length: 2:48
- Label: Capitol
- Songwriter(s): Pee Wee King
- Producer(s): Jimmy Bowen

Glen Campbell singles chronology
"Houston (I'm Comin' to See You)" (1974)	"Bonaparte's Retreat" (1974)	"It's a Sin When You Love Somebody" (1974)

In 1950, Pee Wee King released a single entitled "Bonaparte's Retreat." This version slowed down the traditional melody (the one recorded from W.H. Stepp) and added lyrics, about dancing with and wooing a girl. King's lyrics refer to the original song in the chorus: "I kissed her while the guitars played the 'Bonaparte's Retreat'".

King's song peaked at number 10 on the Billboard Hot Country Singles chart. Kay Starr recorded the song later in 1950. Her version peaked at number 4 on the Billboard Hot 100. Billy Grammer recorded and charted (#50) in 1959 with a crossover pop and country version. Carl Smith issued a country version of the song on his August 1970 LP "Carl Smith and the Tunesmiths" (Columbia C-32015) including a prominent steel guitar and drums, in a semi-fast rolling beat. In Smith's version, the chorus went "I kissed her while the fiddles played the 'Bonaparte's Retreat'". Glen Campbell then covered the song for his 1974 album Houston (I'm Comin' to See You). It was released in July 1974 as the album's second single. Campbell's slightly more rocking version peaked at number 3 on the Billboard Hot Country Singles chart. It also reached number 1 on the RPM Country Tracks chart in Canada.

Willie Nelson also covered the song as a bonus track on the reissue of his 1975 concept album Red Headed Stranger. In addition, the song was covered by Michael Nesmith and the Second National Band's 1972 album Tantamount to Treason Vol. 1.

== Chart performance ==
=== Pee Wee King ===
Chart (1950)	Peak position
US Hot Country Songs (Billboard)	10

=== Kay Starr ===
Chart (1950)	Peak position
US Billboard Hot 100	4

=== Glen Campbell ===
Chart (1974)	Peak position
Australia (Kent Music Report)	4
Canadian RPM Country Tracks	1
US Hot Country Songs (Billboard)	3
Billboard Adult Contemporary Tracks	42
