= NPPC =

NPPC may refer to:

- National Pork Producers Council, an American pork industry lobbying organization
- Nobel Peace Prize Concert
- Natriuretic peptide precursor C, a protein
