= Checkoff =

Bookkeeping mechanism

A checkoff or check-off is a bookkeeping mechanism that provides for regular payment of an obligation, typically referring to the collection of union dues via a deduction from a worker's paycheck by an employer. It can also refer to an optional selection on a tax return to instruct that a portion of one's income tax be used for a specific purpose, such as the Presidential Election Campaign Fund. The same term is also used to refer to a mandatory tax on sales of agricultural goods (paid by the producer) which finances a generic commodity marketing and research program; one example is the commodity checkoff programs mandated by the United States Department of Agriculture to promote sales and research of milk, beef, soybeans, or sorghum. The Got Milk? advertising campaign is one well known example of an initiative funded by these checkoff assessments.

== See also ==
- Rand formula - Canadian labor law
- Beef. It's What's for Dinner
- Dairy Management Inc.
- United Soybean Board
