= Christmas Tree Promotion, Research, and Information Order =

Provision of the 2014 U.S. Farm Bill

The Christmas Tree Promotion, Research, and Information Order is a provision of the 2014 U.S. Farm Bill that established a U.S. Department of Agriculture commodity checkoff program for cultivated Christmas trees. The program is funded through a $.15 per tree fee paid by growers. The program creates a marketing program similar to other checkoff programs such as "Got Milk?" or "Beef. It's What's For Dinner". The order was briefly implemented by the U.S. Department of Agriculture's Agricultural Marketing Service in November 2011. After a wave of political criticism the rule that established the program was officially stayed before being passed into law over two years later.

== Provisions ==
The Christmas Tree Promotion, Research, and Information Order is the U.S. Department of Agriculture rule establishing the industry-funded promotion, research and information program in support of fresh-cut Christmas trees. The order is what is known in the United States as a commodity checkoff program. It was requested by the Christmas tree growing industry as a result of declining numbers in sales and farms nationwide. The program is funded by growers and retailers through a $.15 per tree fee; growers that produce less than 500 trees per year are exempted from the fee. The fee was among the program's most publicized provisions.

While it is up to individuals whether to pass the fee on to consumers, the National Christmas Tree Association (NCTA) stated the order is not expected to affect the retail price of fresh-cut Christmas trees. The program allows farmers to allow the government to implement and oversee the program through a Christmas Tree Promotion Board and the funds collected from assessed trees. The board is made up of producers and importers. At the time the rule was proposed, the USDA had implemented more than 20 similar programs including those responsible for the well-known "Got Milk?", "Beef: It's What's for Dinner" and "The Incredible Edible Egg" campaigns.

The levy is expected to generate $2 million per year. The program includes a 12-member Christmas Tree Promotion Board that would directs funding from the program to promotion programs and advertising meant to show "a favorable image of Christmas trees to the public." The Christmas tree checkoff program also allows for a referendum among all those who paid the 15 cent per tree assessment after three years. This referendum was designed to allow producers and importers to terminate, continue, or amend the program. The program also specified that if a fee over 20 cents per tree or under 10 cents per tree it would require the approval of the majority of producers and importers.

== History ==
Between 1991 and 2007 natural, fresh-cut Christmas tree production in the U.S. declined from 37 million to 31 million. Meanwhile, the artificial Christmas tree industry saw it sale increase dramatically between 2003 and 2007. In the five years between the 2002 and 2007 U.S. Department of Agriculture (USDA) Censuses of Agriculture, the number of Christmas tree farms in the United States went from 21,904 to 12,255.

Work toward the Christmas Tree Promotion, Research, and Information Order began in April 2008 when a group of farmers and retailers began to study similar programs in agricultural industries of similar size. The group's work included more than 100 meetings across the United States. Initially, the proposed rule was published in the Federal Register in November 2010, one year before the order was first implemented. Upon the order's initial publication, the USDA requested input in the form of comments from growers, retailers and the general public. The primary commenting period went from the time the proposed rule was first published, November 8, 2010 until February 7, 2011. After the USDA received several letters from producers, a second commenting period was opened from February 22, 2011 until March 9, 2011. During these two comment periods the USDA received 565 comments concerning the proposed rule; 398 supported it, 147 opposed it and the remaining 20 comments fell into some other category.

The order was originally published in the Federal Register on November 8, 2011 and took effect the same day. USDA authority to establish the program came under the Commodity Promotion, Research and Information Act of 1996, a law which also authorized the similar programs in other agricultural industries.

On the same day the new rule was published in the Federal Register David S. Addington, writing for The Heritage Foundation's blog, labeled the new rule a "tax" and criticized it in his column. Conservative commentators began to attack the proposal, particularly after a link to The Heritage Foundation's article was featured on Drudge Report, a highly trafficked website. The moniker "Christmas tree tax" was applied in numerous media outlets. The Wall Street Journal criticized the program as "corporate welfare". Despite the criticism the Obama administration and the NCTA denied that the program featured a new Christmas tree tax. In addition, some media outlets, such as Agence France Presse, immediately characterized the program as a "tax that's not a tax". By the end of the day on November 8, the rule was rescinded, officially it was "stayed". The notice concerning the rule's cancellation was published in the Federal Register on November 17, 2011; the stay took effect that same day.

Capital Press reported in May 2012 that the U.S. Department of Agriculture had not put a timetable on moving the Christmas tree checkoff program forward. The USDA Agricultural Marketing Service did tell the publication that the program was "under review". One of the Christmas tree farmers who spearheaded efforts to establish the Christmas Tree Promotion, Research, and Information Order stated that she did not expect any action on the program until after the 2012 U.S. presidential election. During the summer of 2012 an article posted to USAgNet quoted the director of the NCTA as confirming that there would be no action on the proposal until after the November 2012 election. The July 30 article quoted the NCTA director as stating he had assurances from the current Secretary of Agriculture that the Christmas Tree Promotion, Research, and Information Order would be "released for implementation" before the end of the year. That meant that no funds would be collected under the checkoff program until at least 2013.

The Christmas Tree Promotion, Research, and Information Order was included as originally published in the Agricultural Act of 2014, more commonly known as the Farm Bill, and passed by Congress on January 29, 2014. The order's inclusion was pushed for by members of the U.S. House of Representatives including Oregon Democrat Kurt Schrader and Wisconsin Republican Reid Ribble. Ribble helped negotiate with Republican leaders for the order's inclusion, and though at least one version of the order was rejected it was eventually reworked and added to the Farm Bill without resistance. An April 2014 press release announced that the U.S. Department of Agriculture created rules as mandated by the Agricultural Act of 2014 that allowed the Christmas check-off program to move forward. The department actively began seeking nominations for the Christmas Tree Promotion Board at that time. The rule that officially stayed the program in November 2011 was officially rescinded on April 8, 2014.

== Reactions ==
As stated, when the program was initially enacted many in the media characterized the checkoff program as a "Christmas tree tax". After The Heritage Foundation criticized the program as a tax, many other media outlets followed. The Obama administration and the NCTA both denied that checkoff programs were taxes.

In the aftermath of the "Christmas tree tax" story, other commodity checkoff programs saw their momentum wane. A proposed checkoff program for raspberries, initially expected to be implemented in November 2011, was delayed until the spring of 2012 by the USDA. That checkoff program had been approved by 88 percent of "affected" raspberry growers in May 2011. Though a formal proposal had not been submitted for a blackberry checkoff program, the North American Raspberry and Blackberry Association stated that plans for pursuing one had put on hold due to the negative climate surrounding checkoffs.

In 2014, when the rule was finally enacted, the National Christmas Tree Association stated in a press release that they were "pleased". They also noted that the program would be funded by growers and was expected to have no impact on the consumer price of Christmas trees.
