= White meat =

Meat which is pale before and after cooking

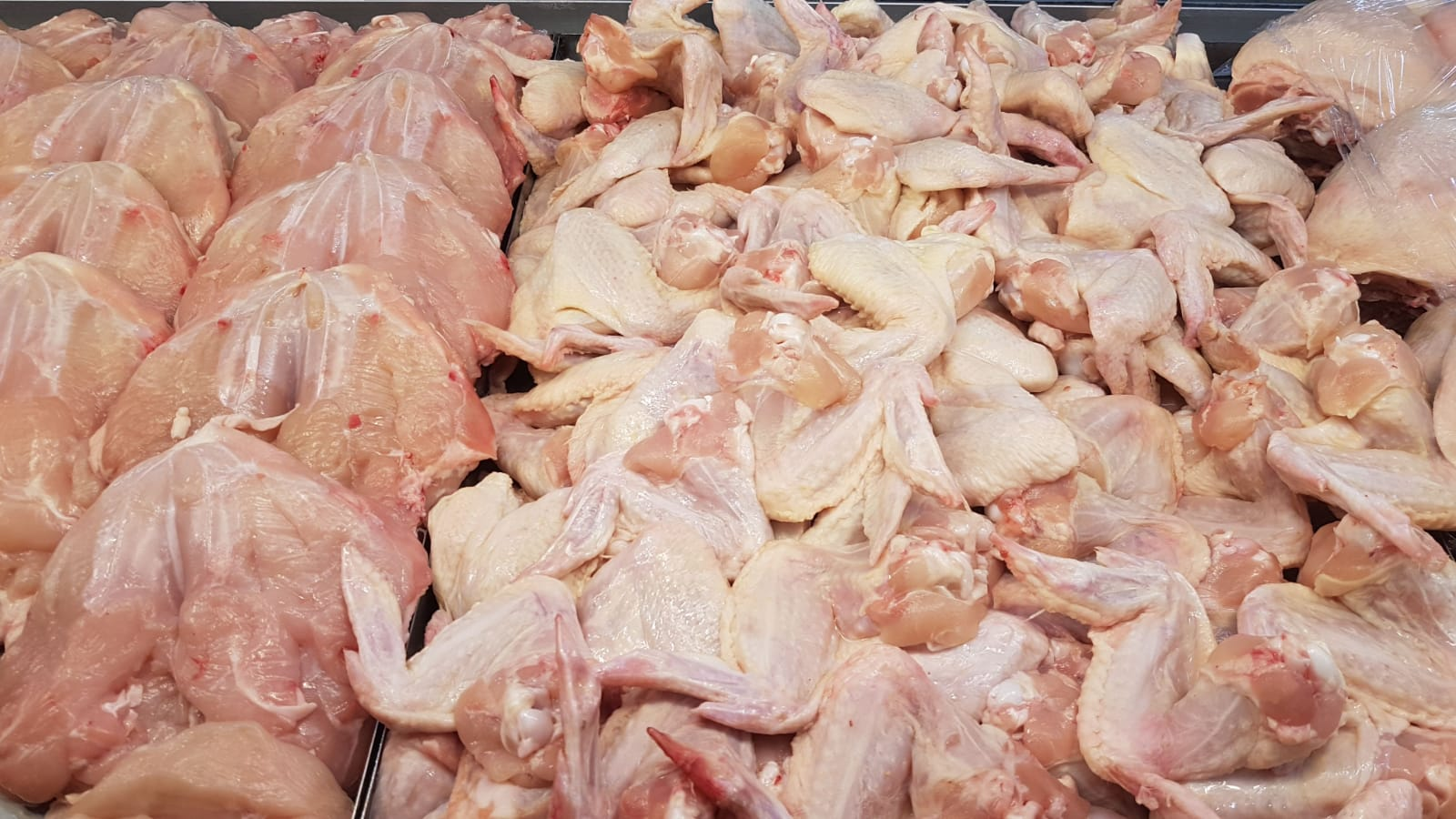
Chicken is a widely consumed white meat.

In culinary terms, white meat is meat which is pale in color before and after cooking. In traditional gastronomy, white meat also includes rabbit, the flesh of milk-fed young mammals (in particular veal and lamb), and sometimes pork. In culinary contexts, the term is employed loosely, and not used in perfect contrast to the nutritional category of red meat.

Various factors have resulted in debate centering on the definition of white and red meat. Dark meat is used to describe darker-colored flesh. A common example is the lighter-colored meat of poultry (white meat), coming from the breast, as contrasted with darker-colored meat from the legs (dark meat). Certain types of poultry that are sometimes grouped as white meat are red when raw, such as duck and goose. Some types of fish, such as tuna, sometimes are red when raw and turn white when cooked.

== Terminology ==
The terms white, red, light and dark applied to meat have varied and inconsistent meanings in different contexts. The term white meat in particular has caused confusion from oversimplification in scientific publications, misuse of the term in the popular press, and evolution of the term over decades. Some writers suggest avoiding the terms "red" and "white" altogether, instead classifying meat by objective characteristics such as myoglobin or heme iron content, lipid profile, fatty acid composition, cholesterol content, etc.

In nutritional studies, white meat may also include land snails and amphibians like frogs. Mammal flesh (eg; beef, pork, goat, lamb, doe, rabbit) is excluded and considered to be red meat (although rabbit meat is sometimes considered to be white meat). Periodically some researchers allow lean cuts of rabbit to be an outlier and categorize it into the “white meat” category because it shares certain nutritional similarities with poultry. Otherwise, nutritional studies and social studies popularly define "red meat" as coming from any mammal, "seafood" as coming from fish and shellfish, and "white meat" coming from birds and other animals. Some entomologists have referred to edible insects as "the next white meat".

The United States Department of Agriculture (USDA) typically classifies red meat, poultry, and seafood as their own separate categories. The USDA considers all livestock animals (including beef, veal, pork) to be "red meat” because their muscles contain enough myoglobin that their fresh meat is deep red in color prior to being cooked. Poultry and seafood are not considered to be red meats because they contain less myoglobin. The term white meat is used to describe poultry in particular; while this includes duck and geese, they are considered to be a dark meat. Seafood is treated as a distinct product and not included as a type of meat by the USDA's FSIS. The World Health Organization (WHO) distinguishes between white meat and seafood.

== Poultry ==
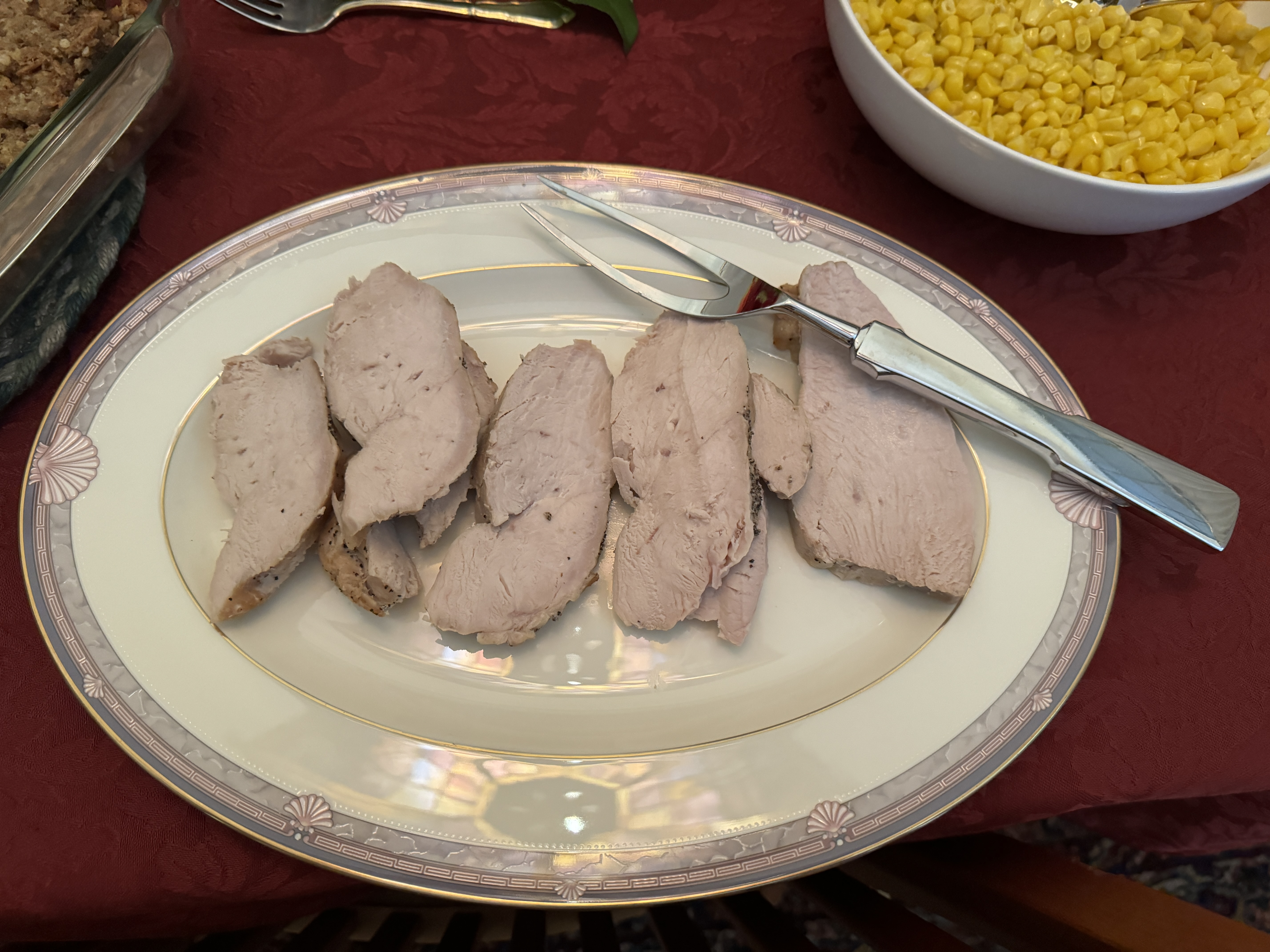
Cooked turkey breast

Within poultry, there are two types of meats—white and dark. The different colours are based on the different locations and uses of the muscles. White meat can be found within the breast of a chicken or turkey. Dark muscles are fit to develop endurance or long-term use, and contain more myoglobin than white muscles, allowing the muscle to use oxygen more efficiently for aerobic respiration. White meat contains large amounts of protein.

Dark meat contains 2.64 times more saturated fat than white meat, per gram of protein. One commentator wrote that dark meat contains more vitamins, while a New York Times columnist has stated the two meats are nearly identical in nutritional value, especially when compared with typical red meat. For ground-based birds like chicken and turkeys, dark meats occur in the legs, which are used to support the weight of the animals while they move. According to the U.S. Department of Agriculture, 28 grams (1 oz) of boneless, skinless turkey breast contains about one gram of fat, compared with roughly two grams of fat for 28 g (1 oz) of boneless, skinless thigh. The numbers go up when the skin is kept in: a chicken thigh, with skin intact, has 13 grams of total fat and 3.5 grams of saturated fat per 85 g (3 oz) serving; this is about 20 percent of the recommended maximum daily intake. Birds which use their chest muscles for sustained flight (such as geese and ducks) have dark meat throughout their bodies.

== Pork ==
Because of health concerns, meat producers have positioned pork as "white meat", taking advantage of the traditional gastronomic definition. The United States National Pork Board has marketed their product as "Pork. The Other White Meat".

In Israel, where Jewish dietary laws which forbid the consumption of pork are popularly practiced, "white meat" is the accepted euphemism for pork.

== Health effects ==
The health effects that correlate with white meat consumption have been studied as compared to red meat. Cancer Council Australia have stated that "there is not enough evidence to draw any conclusions on eating chicken, or other white meats and cancer risk".

A 2017 review found that white meat consumption is associated with reduced risk of stroke. A 2022 review found that high poultry intake is associated with an increased risk of pancreatic cancer, though fish intake is unlikely to be associated with cancer risk. A 2023 meta-analysis found no association between white meat intake and cardiovascular disease and type 2 diabetes. A 2025 review of dietary factors and colorectal cancer risk in Asian populations found that white meat intake was associated with a potential 40% increased risk of rectal cancer.
