= LCP =

LCP may refer to:

== Science, medicine and technology ==
- Large Combustion Plant, see Large Combustion Plant Directive
- Le Chatelier's principle, equilibrium law in chemistry
- Left Circular polarization, in radio communications
- Legg–Calvé–Perthes syndrome, hip disorder
- Licensed Clinical Psychologist, see Clinical psychology
- Ligand close packing theory, in chemistry
- Light compensation point, in biology
- Linear complementarity problem, in mathematical optimisation
- Link Control Protocol, in computer networking
- Liquid Crystal Polymer, a kind of polymer
- Liverpool Care Pathway for the Dying Patient, care guidance for dying hospital patients
- Living cationic polymerization, a process in chemistry
- Locking Compression Plate, an implant aiding the healing of a bone fracture
- Long-chain polyunsaturated fatty acid
- Longest Common Prefix array, in computer science

== Organisations ==
- Latvijas Centrālās Padomes, Latvian Central Council
- Lebanese Communist Party
- Liberal and Country Party, the name of the Victorian division of the Liberal Party of Australia from 1949 to 1965
- Liberal Country Party, splinter group of the Victorian branch of the Australian Country Party 1938–1943
- Library Company of Philadelphia, US library founded by Benjamin Franklin
- London College of Communication, formerly the London College of Printing
- League of Poor Peasants

== Other uses ==
- La Chaîne parlementaire, French parliamentary television channel
- Lance Corporal, military rank
- Landing Craft Personnel
- League of Legends Championship Pacific, esports league
- Least cost planning methodology, in economics modelling
- Little Computer People, 1980s computer simulation game
- Livestock Compensation Program, USDA program
- Readium LCP, digital rights management system using file extension .lcpl
- Ruger LCP, a subcompact pistol
- Live-in Caregiver Program, Canadian work visa program
- Toyota Land Cruiser Prado, a vehicle

== See also ==
- Landing Craft Vehicle Personnel, type of military boat
