= National Processed Raspberry Council =

U.S. agricultural organization

- "Red Razz" logo of the National Processed Raspberry Council
- Location(s): 1796 Front St. Lynden, WA 98264-1714
- Coordinates: 48.939441°N 122.474427°W
- Chairperson: John S. Clark
- Vice Chairperson: Ravinder S. Dhaliwal
- Executive Director: Thomas Krugman
- Budget: $2.7 million (October 1, 2015 – September 30, 2016)
- Website: www.redrazz.org

The National Processed Raspberry Council is a U.S. organization that promotes and researches processed raspberries. It is part of a commodity checkoff program overseen by the U.S. Department of Agriculture.

== Purpose ==
The National Processed Raspberry Council's self-stated mission is to "conduct nutrition research on the health and wellness benefits of raspberries and to promote the consumption of processed raspberries based on research results" The basic core of the council's work centers on research and promotion.

== History ==
The Washington Red Raspberry Commission initially approached the U.S. Department of Agriculture about establishing a national research and promotion program, better known as a commodity checkoff program. The USDA's Agricultural Marketing Service conducted a referendum among affected raspberry growers and importers in June 2011. Support for the raspberry checkoff program was around 88 percent in that referendum.

As the rule establishing the checkoff program - the Processed Raspberries Research and Promotion Order - was being finalized the USDA put a temporary hold on its implementation. The delay was due to the backlash surrounding the attempted implementation of a similar rule regarding Christmas trees in November 2011. The proposed Christmas tree checkoff created political controversy when it was characterized as a tax in the media. The Washington Red Raspberry Commission expected the program to be implemented in November 2011. After several months of delay the rule establishing the checkoff program was finally implemented in May 2012.

== Funding ==
The council is funded through a fee assessed on producers and importers of raspberries for processing. The fee is $.01 per pound of raspberries produced or imported. Producers and importers are exempted from the assessment if they produce or import less than 20,000 pounds of the crop.
