= Kenyon & Eckhardt =

Famous advertising team

Kenyon & Eckhardt was an independent advertising agency that was acquired by Lorimar in 1983, which then acquired Bozell Jacobs in 1985 and merged them. Lorimar's merged ad agency property was initially named Bozell, Jacobs, Kenyon & Eckhart. In 1992 the consolidated agency was renamed Bozell Worldwide.

== History ==
The company was founded in 1929 by Otis Kenyon and Henry Eckhardt. Kenyon had offices in several cities. From 1968 to 1986, the company was headed by noted advertisement executive Leo-Arthur Kelmenson, who conceived an advertisement campaign that turned around the fortunes of Chrysler Corporation and helped make Chrysler chief executive Lee Iacocca a household name.
