= United Soybean Board =

The United Soybean Board (USB) is the governing body that instantiates the U.S. commodity checkoff program for soybeans. It is made up of 77 volunteer farmer-directors who oversee the investments of the soybean checkoff on behalf of all U.S. soybean farmers. The soybean checkoff is a congressionally-mandated assessment on soybeans, whose proceeds are used to fund soybean research and promotion efforts. The checkoff is managed by the United Soybean Board under the supervision of the United States Department of Agriculture Agricultural Marketing Service. In 2014, the checkoff was $109.1 million.

Checkoff funds are invested in the areas of animal utilization, human utilization, industrial utilization, industry relations, market access, and supply. As stipulated in the Soybean Promotion, Research, and Consumer Information Act, USDA’s Agricultural Marketing Service has oversight responsibilities for USB and the soybean checkoff.

The checkoff rate is 0.5% of the market price of soybeans sold each season. The volunteer farmer-directors are nominated by their state-level checkoff organizations, called Qualified State Soybean Boards (QSSBs). The nominees are appointed by the U.S. Secretary of Agriculture to the Board.

== History ==
Congress authorized the soybean checkoff in the Soybean Promotion, Research, and Consumer Information Act of 1991. The USDA instantiated the soybean checkoff September 1, 1991.
