= Remsenburg, New York =

Hamlet in New York, United States

Coordinates: 40°48′28″N 72°42′32″W

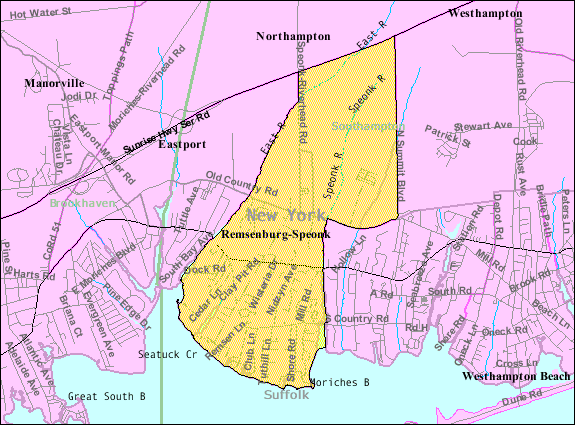
U.S. Census map

Remsenburg is a hamlet located in the Town of Southampton, Suffolk County, Long Island, New York, United States.

There are no stoplights and no businesses other than the post office and churches.

== History ==
As early as 1712, meadows in Speonk were leased to cattle-owners from Southampton. Most of the early settlers of Speonk came west from Southampton and Bridgehampton in the 1740s to clear the forests and build farms. During the 1880s, duck farms thrived in Speonk and neighboring Eastport, but few survived into the 20th Century, and none remain today.

The name Speonk was inspired by a Native American word meaning high place. An 1897 Long Island Rail Road catalog listed Speonk, noting that that name "certainly sounds like the call of a frog." Some residents pressed to change the name to Remsenburg, to honor a prominent resident, Charles Remsen, who had donated a new Presbyterian Church. Today, both names remain in use, each covering different areas of the community. The area close to the bay is called Remsenburg, and the more bucolic inland area is still called Speonk.

During the twentieth century, its most famous resident was the English writer P.G. Wodehouse. He wrote many of the escapades of Bertie Wooster and his manservant, Jeeves, from a home on Basket Neck Lane in Remsenburg. Other residents of note include the songwriter Frank Loesser, who wrote for Broadway shows including Guys and Dolls; the playwright Guy Bolton, who collaborated with Wodehouse on Anything Goes; Marvel Comics editor Stan Lee; Sandy Becker, a New York children's television host, Dave Garroway, the original host of NBC's Today Show when it first aired in January 1952, and Leo-Arthur Kelmenson, advertising executive known for his association with Lee Iacocca and his advertising campaign for Chrysler. Remsenburg is an exclusive area, and many well known actress/actors/playwrights/directors live in this hamlet of Southampton.

== Geography ==
Remsenburg is located at geographic coordinates 40° 48' 28" North, 72° 42' 32" West (40.807709, -72.708923). Remsenburg is located within the Town of Southampton, County of Suffolk, and adjoins Moriches Bay. It is considered to be geographically, historically, and culturally part of the Hamptons.
