= I Knew Jesus (Before He Was a Star) =

Studio album by Glen Campbell
- Released: May 1973
- Recorded: 1973
- Studio: Hollywood Sound Recorders, Hollywood, California
- Genre: Country
- Label: Capitol
- Producer: Jimmy Bowen

Glen Campbell chronology
Glen Travis Campbell (1972)	I Knew Jesus (Before He Was a Star) (1973)	I Remember Hank Williams (1973)

Professional ratings
Review scores
Source	Rating
AllMusic	link

I Knew Jesus (Before He Was a Star) is the 24th album by American singer/guitarist Glen Campbell, released in 1973. The record entered Billboard's Album charts June 1973, reaching a peak position of #154 and remaining on the chart for six weeks.

== Track listing ==
=== Side one ===
1. "I Knew Jesus (Before He Was a Star)" (Neal Hefti, Seymore Styne) – 2:50
2. "I Take It On Home" (Kenny O'Dell) – 3:11
3. "Sold American" (Kinky Friedman) – 3:22
4. "I Want to Be with You Always" (Lefty Frizzell) – 2:18
5. "If Not for You" (Bob Dylan) – 2:46

=== Side two ===
1. "Give Me Back That Old Familiar Feeling" (Bill C. Graham) – 2:46
2. "You're the One" (Bob Morrison) – 2:42
3. "Amazing Grace" (John Newton) – 4:24
4. "On This Road" (Ted Hamilton) – 2:18
5. "Someday Soon" (Ian Tyson) – 2:16

== Personnel ==
- Glen Campbell – vocals, acoustic and electric guitars, bagpipes
- James Burton – electric guitar
- Carol Kaye – bass guitar
- Robert Ross – acoustic guitar
- Hal Blaine – drums
- Larry Muhoberac – keyboards
- Josephine Dapar – backing vocals

== Production ==
- Producer – Jimmy Bowen
- Arranger – Dennis McCarthy
- Engineer – John Guess
- Art direction – John Hoernle
- Design – Roy Kohara

== Charts ==
Album – Billboard (United States)

Chart	Entry date	Peak position	No. of weeks
Billboard 200	September 6, 1973	154	6
Billboard Country Albums	September 6, 1973	13	9

Singles – Billboard (United States)

Year	Single	Hot Country Singles	Hot 100	Easy Listening
1973	"I Knew Jesus (Before He Was a Star)"	48	45	26
