= Bozell =

Public relations and ad agency

- Industry: Advertising, Public relations
- Founded: 1921 as Bozell & Jacobs, Inc.
- Founders: Leo B. Bozell; Morris Jacobs
- Defunct: 2025
- Headquarters: Omaha, Nebraska, U.S.

Bozell was an American full-service public relations and advertising agency in Omaha, Nebraska. Founded in 1921, the agency rose to global prominence in the 1980s and 90s through a series of mergers and acquisitions, before its Omaha office split off from Interpublic in 2001 and reestablished it as a local agency. Bozell closed in 2025.

== History ==
Bozell traced its roots to the company founded in 1921 in Omaha, Nebraska by Leo Bozell and Morris Jacobs as Bozell & Jacobs, Inc. In 1985, the firm was purchased by Lorimar and merged with another Lorimar entity, Kenyon & Eckhardt to form Bozell, Jacobs, Kenyon & Eckhardt. In 1992 the firm shortened its name to Bozell Worldwide. From 1986 to 1993, the company was headed by noted advertisement executive Leo-Arthur Kelmenson, who contributed significantly to the turnaround of Chrysler Corporation.

Bozell Worldwide was well known for its campaigns, which have introduced memorable slogans and ads, such as:

- "Pork. The Other White Meat"
- "Corinthian leather"
- "Genesis does what Nintendon't"
- "The Old Home Fill-er-up and Keep On-a-Truckin' Café"

In 1997, Bozell was acquired by True North, holding company for FCB. The New York Times described the combination as the world's sixth largest advertising company.

In 2001, the remaining largest offices of Bozell Worldwide were merged with Lowe Worldwide as part of the Interpublic Group of Companies. The managing partners of the Bozell office in Omaha then bought themselves out from the holding company, renamed using the historic Bozell & Jacobs name, and continued as an independent shop again; other units of the conglomerate continued as Bozell until 2003, when they were merged with Lowe Worldwide.

In 2013, Bozell proclaimed on their website Women’s Business Enterprise National Council (WBENC) certification for being 50+% woman-owned.

In 2024, Bozell announced that it was using a new cost structure in response to challenges posed by the COVID-19 pandemic. The agency closed in March 2025.

== Leadership ==
- Leo Bozell (co-founder)
- Morris Jacobs (co-founder)
- Charles Peebler Jr.
- Leo-Arthur Kelmenson
- William Ward White
- David Bell

== See also ==
- Gonzalo Tassier
