= Livestock Compensation Program =

American government program

The Livestock Compensation Program is a program administratively authorized by the United States Department of Agriculture (USDA) in 2002 to compensate certain livestock producers for feed and pasture losses caused by a natural disaster declared in 2001 and 2002.

Under the program, estimated total direct payments of just over $1 billion were made to all producers of beef, dairy, sheep and goats in any county that was declared a disaster area by the Secretary of Agriculture between January 1, 2001, and February 20, 2003, regardless of the individual producer's loss experience. The payment rates under the LCP were $31.50 per adult dairy cattle, $18 per adult beef cattle, $13.50 for certain livestock over 500 lbs., and $4.50 per sheep or goat. Payments were limited to $40,000 per person, and were not made to any person with qualifying gross revenue over $2.5 million.

The program was not specifically authorized by Congress but was initially implemented by USDA under existing authorities. It was initiated because funding was not available to implement the Livestock Assistance Program.
