= Glen Travis Campbell (album) =

Studio album by Glen Campbell
- Released: October 1972
- Recorded: 1972
- Studio: Capitol (Hollywood); Hollywood Sound Recorders (Hollywood)
- Genre: Country
- Label: Capitol
- Producer: Jimmy Bowen

Glen Campbell chronology
The Artistry of Glen Campbell (1972)	Glen Travis Campbell (1972)	I Knew Jesus (1973)

Glen Travis Campbell is the eponymous seventeenth studio album by American country music artist Glen Campbell, released in 1972 through Capitol Records. Recorded in Hollywood, and produced by Jimmy Bowen, the album's title refers to his full name. The record entered Billboard's Album charts November 1972, reaching a peak position of #148 and remaining on the chart for thirteen weeks.

The singles "I Will Never Pass This Way Again" and "One Last Time" (written by the Addrisi Brothers) reached 61 and 78 respectively on the Billboard 100 pop chart.

== Track listing ==
Side 1:

1. "I Will Never Pass This Way Again" (Ronnie Gaylord) – 2:41
2. "One Last Time" (Don Addrisi, Dick Addrisi) – 3:14
3. "Sweet Fantasy" (Hoyt Axton) – 2:54
4. "She Thinks I Still Care" (Dickey Lee, Steve Duffy) – 3:07
5. "Running Scared" (Roy Orbison, Joe Melson) – 2:24

Side 2:

1. "Someone to Give My Love To" (Jerry Foster, Bill Rice) – 2:57
2. "All My Tomorrows" (Sammy Cahn, Jimmy Van Heusen) – 3:15
3. "My Cricket" (Leon Russell) – 2:33
4. "Just for What I Am" (Dallas Frazier, A. L. Owens) – 3:20
5. "The Last Thing on My Mind" (Tom Paxton) – 3:54

== Personnel ==
- Glen Campbell – vocals, acoustic guitar
- Larry Muhoberac – keyboards
- Dennis McCarthy – piano

== Production ==
- Producer – Jimmy Bowen
- Arranged by Larry Muhoberac
- "I Will Never Pass This Way Again", "Just For What I Am" arranged by Dennis McCarthy
- "Sweet Fantasy" arranged by Glen Campbell
- Engineers – John Guess, Ed Flaherty
- Art direction – John Hoernie
- Design – Roy Kohara
- Photography – Don Peterson

== Charts ==
Album – Billboard (United States)

Chart	Entry date	Peak position	No. of weeks
Billboard 200	November 25, 1972	148	13
Billboard Country Albums	February 12, 1972	5	14

Singles – Billboard (United States)

Year	Single	Hot Country Singles	Hot 100	Easy Listening
1972	"I Will Never Pass This Way Again"	45	61	14
1973	"One Last Time"	33	78	20
