= Houston (I'm Comin' to See You) =

Studio album by Glen Campbell
- Released: April 30, 1974
- Recorded: 1974
- Studio: Hollywood Sound Recorders, Hollywood, California
- Genre: Country
- Label: Capitol
- Producer: Jimmy Bowen

Glen Campbell chronology
I Remember Hank Williams (1973)	Houston (I'm Comin' to See You) (1974)	Reunion: The Songs of Jimmy Webb (1974)

Houston (I'm Comin' to See You) is the twenty-sixth studio album by American singer/guitarist Glen Campbell, released in 1974 (see 1974 in music).

== Track listing ==
Side 1:

1. "Houston (I'm Comin' to See You)" (David Paich) – 3:21
2. "Too Many Mornings" (George Place) – 2:50
3. "Lovesick Blues" (Irving Mills, Cliff Friend) – 2:33
4. "Yesterday, When I Was Young" (Charles Aznavour, Herbert Kretzmer) – 3:41
5. "Lovelight" (Bill C. Graham, Glen Castleberry) – 2:21

Side 2:

1. "No Love at All" (Wayne Carson Thompson, Johnny Christopher) – 2:42
2. "Honestly Loved" (Graham, Castleberry) – 2:45
3. "Bonaparte's Retreat" (Pee Wee King) – 2:48
4. "If I Were Loving You" (Graham, Castleberry) – 2:55
5. "A Beautiful Love Song" (Graham) – 2:28

== Personnel ==
- Glen Campbell – acoustic guitar, electric guitars, bagpipes
- Hal Blaine – drums
- Joe Osborn – bass guitar
- Larry Muhoberac – keyboards
- David Paich – keyboards
- Dean Parks – acoustic guitar

== Production ==
- Producer – Jimmy Bowen
- Arranger – Dennis McCarthy
- "Houston (I'm Coming to See You)", "Honestly Loved" arranged by Marty Paich
- Engineer – John Guess
- Art director – Roy Kohara
- Illustration – Brian Zick

== Charts ==
Album – Billboard (United States)

Chart	Entry date	Peak position	No. of weeks
Billboard Country Albums	June 22, 1974	12	13

Singles – Billboard (United States)

Year	Single	Hot Country Singles	Hot 100	Easy Listening
1974	"Houston (I'm Comin' to See You)"	20	68	13
1974	"Bonaparte's Retreat"	3	-	42
