= Leo-Arthur Kelmenson =

American advertising executive

- Born: January 3, 1927; New York City, U.S.
- Died: August 30, 2011 (aged 84); Remsenburg, New York, U.S.
- Education: Columbia University (BA)
- Occupation: Advertising executive
- Known for: Chairman and CEO of Kenyon & Eckhardt and Bozell

Leo-Arthur Kelmenson (January 3, 1927 – August 30, 2011) was an American advertising executive. He was chief executive of Kenyon & Eckhardt and the Bozell Group. A confidant and close associate of Lee Iacocca, he was known for contributing the turnaround of Chrysler Corporation by creating the ad campaign that helped to revive the ailing company and reshape its image.

== Biography ==
Kelmenson was born in Manhattan on January 3, 1927, the son of Ruth and Joseph Kelmenson, a manufacturing executive. He left high school at 17 left high school and lied about his age to serve in the Marine Corps in the Pacific during World War II and suffered bullet wounds in his left leg that left him with a lifelong limp. He fought in the Battle of Okinawa and received a Bronze Star and two Purple Hearts.

Following the war, Kelmenson spent some time recuperating from war injuries in Oceanside, California, and made his first Hollywood connections there through an uncle. He received his B.A. from Columbia University in 1951 and pursued graduate education in international affairs in Geneva. Kelmenson then changed course and joined the advertising industry, first as a mailroom clerk in the firm of Lennen & Newell, where he rose to senior vice president before joining Kenyon & Eckhardt in 1968. He was also a special projects officer for the United States Department of State during the 1960s.

As chief executive of Kenyon & Eckhardt, Kelmenson walked away from an $80 million-a-year contract with Ford Motor Company to become the exclusive advertising agency of the Chrysler Corporation after Ford fired its president Lee Iacocca, a longtime friend of Kelmenson's who was then joined Chrysler as chief executive. By switching accounts to Chrysler, Kelmenson helped secure an estimated $120 million a year in business for Kenyon & Eckhardt, which was then the largest account shift in U.S. advertising history.

Kelmenson's advertising campaign contributed to the turnaround of Chrysler's fortunes by securing a government bailout and saving the automaker and turned Iacocca into a folk hero who registered third on the Gallup Poll's list of the men Americans respected most in the 1980s. Through a series of mergers and acquisitions, he became chief executive of Bozell, a marketing, advertising and public relations firm. His other clients included Colgate-Palmolive, Air France, Seagram, Elizabeth Arden, General Motors, Daimler Chrysler and Mitsubishi.

Kelmenson was also chairman of Foote, Cone & Belding, and executive advisor to David Bell, Chairman and CEO of The Interpublic Group of Companies. He was also a director of Lorimar-Telepictures, Online Software, and True North Communications. He retired from the industry in 1999.

Kelmenson died on August 30, 2011, in his Remsenburg, New York home. He was inducted into the Advertising Hall of Fame posthumously in 2012.
