= Sheep Promotion, Research, and Information Act of 1994 =

The Sheep Promotion, Research, and Information Act of 1994 (Public Law 103-407) enabled domestic sheep producers and feeders and importers of sheep and sheep products to develop, finance, and carry out a nationally coordinated program for sheep and sheep product promotion, research, and information. The program is funded as a commodity checkoff program.

This law was enacted a year after passage of legislation to phase out the wool and mohair commodity programs (new support programs for wool and mohair were included in the Farm Security and Rural Investment Act of 2002 (P.L. 107-171), the 2002 farm bill.

The United States Department of Agriculture (USDA) was authorized to issue a sheep and wool promotion, research, education, and information order subject to approval referendums among producers, feeders, and importers. In a 1996 referendum, the proposed check-off program was defeated. About 53% of nearly 12,000 ballots opposed the order. This group represented 67% of the production that voted.

== Government support for ovine industry ==
=== Checkoff ===
The American Lamb Board collects from domestic producers $0.007 per pound of lamb and mutton and $0.42 per head. It spends to develop and expand the markets for sheep and sheep products. The board operates under the supervision of the United States Department of Agriculture Agricultural Marketing Service.

The Lamb Board was authorized by the Commodity Promotion, Research, and Information Act of 1996(P.L. 104-127). It was instantiated in 2002 by the Agricultural Marketing Service. The Board collects and spends $2.5 million in checkoff funds each year.

=== Grants ===
The Agricultural Marketing Service distributes grants to organizations that enhance the production and marketing of sheep and sheep products in the United States. The National Sheep Industry Improvement Center received $1.475 million in fiscal 2015.

The authority for the Sheep Production and Marketing Grant Program is found in section 12102 of the Agricultural Act of 2014 (P.L 113-79).

=== History ===
The Sheep Promotion, Research, and Information Act of 1994 authorized the establishment of a Lamb Board and a checkoff on meat and wool. In 1996, 53% of nearly 12,000 producers opposed it.
