= I Remember Hank Williams =

Studio album by Glen Campbell
- Released: October 1973
- Recorded: 1973
- Studio: Hollywood Sound Recorders and RCA Recording Studios, Hollywood, California
- Genre: Country
- Label: Capitol
- Producer: Jimmy Bowen

Glen Campbell chronology
I Knew Jesus (1973)	I Remember Hank Williams (1973)	Houston (1974)

Professional ratings
Review scores
Source	Rating
Allmusic	2/5 stars

I Remember Hank Williams is the twenty-fifth album by American singer/guitarist Glen Campbell, released in 1973 (see 1973 in music).

== Track listing ==
All tracks composed by Hank Williams; except where indicated

Side 1:

1. "I Could Never Be Ashamed of You" – 2:56
2. "Your Cheatin' Heart" – 3:17
3. "I'm So Lonesome I Could Cry" – 2:25
4. "Half as Much" (Curley Williams) – 2:47
5. "Wedding Bells" (Claude Boone) – 2:51

Side 2:

1. "You Win Again" – 3:40
2. "A Mansion on the Hill" (Hank Williams, Fred Rose) – 2:42
3. "Take These Chains From My Heart" (Hy Heath, Fred Rose) – 2:34
4. "Cold, Cold Heart" – 2:44
5. "I Can't Help It (If I'm Still in Love with You)" – 2:39

== Personnel ==
- Glen Campbell – vocals, acoustic guitar
- Dennis Budimir – acoustic guitar
- Donnie Lanier – acoustic guitar
- Bill Graham – bass guitar
- Frank Capp – drums
- Alan Estes – percussion
- Larry Knechtel – piano
- Tibor Zeleg – fiddle
- Assa Drori – fiddle

== Production ==
- Producer – Jimmy Bowen
- Arranged by Dennis McCarthy
- Engineers – John Guess (Hollywood Sound Recorders), Grover Helsley (RCA Recording Studios)
- Album design – Tom Wilkes Productions, Inc.

== Charts ==
Album – Billboard (United States)

Chart	Entry date	Peak position	No. of weeks
Billboard Country Albums	May 1, 1973	10	15
