= Paper and Packaging Board =

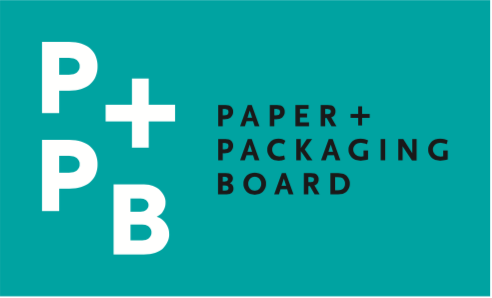

Agency overview
- Formed: January 22, 2014
- Headquarters: McLean, VA
- Agency executive: Mary Anne Hansan, President
- Key document: 79 FR 3695
- Website: www.paperandpackaging.org

The Paper and Packaging Board (P+PB), a commodity checkoff program overseen by the United States Department of Agriculture (USDA), was self-funded through quarterly assessments paid by eligible manufacturers and importers of paper and paper-based packaging. P+PB oversaw the work of the Paper & Packaging – How Life Unfolds campaign designed to increase demand for paper and paper-based packaging.

Funds were used for informational, educational, and promotional activities in support of the industry’s products, and could not be used for advocacy or lobbying. The board was founded by order of the Secretary of Agriculture on January 22, 2014, after a referendum in which manufacturers and importers representing more than 95 percent of the industry’s total production volume voted in favor of its creation.

The Paper and Packaging Board (P+PB) was governed by a 12-member board elected from the participating companies and appointed by the Secretary of Agriculture. The Board was headquartered outside of Washington, DC in McLean, Virginia.

In July 2015, the Board launched the Paper & Packaging – How Life Unfolds campaign highlighting how paper and packaging’s functional and emotional benefits encourage creativity, warmth, learning and connection.

In July 2025, the Paper + Packaging Board's consumer sustainability program, including the How Life Unfolds® campaign, was discontinued after a USDA-administered referendum failed to secure the required level of industry support to continue the checkoff program, resulting in the termination of assessment collections. Following the program's closure, the Paper + Packaging Board's consumer-facing website was retired and now redirects to Two Sides North America, which continues consumer-facing sustainability communications related to paper and paper-based packaging, incorporating research and messaging developed during the How Life Unfolds® campaign.
