= Livestock Assistance Program =

U.S. livestock assistance program

The Livestock Assistance Program (LAP) is an emergency livestock assistance periodically authorized and funded by Congress in response to natural disasters.

The pre-2005 version of LAP provides direct payments to eligible livestock producers who suffered grazing losses due to natural disasters during either calendar year 2001 or 2002 (not both). For an individual producer to be eligible, the producer’s county must have suffered a minimum 40% loss of available grazing for at least 3 consecutive months due to a disaster during the year. The county also had to be declared a disaster area by either the President or the Secretary of Agriculture in 2001 or 2002. Once the county qualified for assistance, a producer had to suffer a minimum loss of 40% in order to qualify for a payment to partially compensate for purchases of off-farm feed. Producers with more than $2.5 million of gross revenue are ineligible. The maximum payment is $40,000 per person.

== Successor programs ==
The Livestock Assistance Program was one of a series of ad-hoc federal livestock disaster programs authorized by supplemental appropriations rather than by permanent statute. The Food, Conservation, and Energy Act of 2008 (2008 Farm Bill) replaced this ad-hoc model with a permanent framework of standing livestock disaster programs administered by the Farm Service Agency, funded from the Agricultural Disaster Relief Trust Fund and, after the Agricultural Act of 2014, from the Commodity Credit Corporation:

- the Livestock Forage Disaster Program (LFP), for grazing losses caused by drought on private grazing land or fire on federally managed grazing land;
- the Livestock Indemnity Program (LIP), for livestock deaths caused by eligible adverse weather, disease, or attacks by federally protected or federally reintroduced predators; and
- the Emergency Assistance for Livestock, Honeybees, and Farm-Raised Fish Program (ELAP), for losses not covered by LFP or LIP, such as feed and water hauling costs and losses to certain diseases and pests.

These three programs were made permanent by Title I, Section 1501, of the 2014 Farm Bill and are codified together at 7 U.S.C. § 9081.
