= Livestock Indemnity Program =

The Livestock Indemnity Program (LIP) is a United States federal program that provides payments to eligible livestock producers for livestock deaths in excess of normal mortality caused by eligible adverse weather events, eligible disease, and attacks by animals reintroduced into the wild by the federal government or protected by federal law, including wolves and avian predators. It is administered by the Farm Service Agency (FSA) of the United States Department of Agriculture (USDA).

LIP was originally authorized as a supplemental disaster program by the Food, Conservation, and Energy Act of 2008 (2008 Farm Bill) and was made a permanent standing program by Title I, Section 1501, of the Agricultural Act of 2014. It is codified at 7 U.S.C. § 9081. Earlier, ad-hoc federal livestock-loss payment programs, such as the Livestock Assistance Program used for the 2001 and 2002 disaster years, were authorized on a one-off basis by supplemental appropriations; the 2008 Farm Bill replaced that ad-hoc model with the current permanent framework.

== Payment rates ==
For most eligible losses, LIP pays 75 percent of the average fair market value of the affected livestock, using per-head national average payment rates that are updated each year by USDA based on prior-year market averages.

On July 8, 2026, USDA announced that, under provisions of the One Big Beautiful Bill Act (P.L. 119-21), payments for livestock losses caused by federally protected predators or by animals reintroduced into the wild by the federal government would be increased from 75 percent to 100 percent of fair market value. The change was made retroactive to January 1, 2026. USDA also began allowing regional price premiums that exceed national average prices to be used in payment calculations, and announced that producers who had filed claims for eligible unborn-livestock losses during 2024 and 2025 would automatically receive additional compensation.
