= Farmers Undertake Environmental Land Stewardship Act =

- Long title: To direct the Administrator of the Environmental Protection Agency to change the Spill Prevention, Control, and Countermeasure rule with respect to certain farms.
- Announced in: the 113th United States Congress
- Sponsored by: Rep. Eric A. "Rick" Crawford (R, AR-1)
- Number of co-sponsors: 34

Codification
- Agencies affected: United States Environmental Protection Agency

Legislative history
- Introduced in the House as H.R. 311 by Rep. Eric A. "Rick" Crawford (R, AR-1) on January 18, 2013; Committee consideration by United States House Committee on Transportation and Infrastructure, United States House Transportation Subcommittee on Water Resources and Environment

The Farmers Undertake Environmental Land Stewardship Act (H.R. 311) is a bill that would require the Environmental Protection Agency (EPA) to modify the Spill Prevention, Control, and Countermeasure (SPCC) rule, which regulates oil discharges into navigable waters and adjoining shorelines. The rule requires certain farmers to develop an oil spill prevention plan that is certified by a professional engineer and may require them to make infrastructure changes. According to supporters, this bill would "ease the burden placed on farmers and ranchers" by making it easier for smaller farms to self-certify and raising the level of storage capacity under which farms are exempted. These rules apply to any storage units that contain oil, whether petroleum products or animal fats.

The bill was introduced into the United States House of Representatives during the 113th United States Congress.

== Provisions of the bill ==
This summary is based largely on the summary provided by the Congressional Research Service, a public domain source.

The Farmers Undertake Environmental Land Stewardship Act or the FUELS Act would require the Administrator of the Environmental Protection Agency (EPA), in implementing the Spill Prevention, Control, and Countermeasure rule with respect to any farm, to require certification of compliance with such rule by: (1) a professional engineer for a farm with an individual tank with an aboveground storage capacity greater than 10,000 gallons, an aggregate aboveground storage capacity of at least 42,000 gallons, or a history that includes a spill, as determined by the Administrator; or (2) the owner or operator of the farm (via self-certification) for a farm with an aggregate aboveground storage capacity greater than 10,000 gallons but less than 42,000 gallons and no history of spills. The bill would direct the Administrator to exempt from all requirements of such rule any farm with an aggregate aboveground storage capacity of 10,000 gallons or less and no history of spills.

The bill would exclude from the aggregate storage capacity of a farm all containers on separate parcels that have a capacity that is less than 1,320 gallons.

== Congressional Budget Office report ==
This summary is based largely on the summary provided by the Congressional Budget Office, as ordered reported by the House Committee on Transportation and Infrastructure on October 29, 2013. This is a public domain source.

H.R. 311 would have no significant net impact on the federal budget, the Congressional Budget Office (CBO) estimates. The bill would require the Environmental Protection Agency (EPA) to modify the Spill Prevention, Control, and Countermeasure (SPCC) rule, which regulates oil discharges into navigable waters and adjoining shorelines. A portion of the SPCC rule, effective as of September 23, 2013, requires certain farmers to develop an oil spill prevention plan that is certified by a professional engineer. Those plans could involve certain infrastructure changes to reduce the possibility of oil spills. Such plans apply to farms that store more than 1,320 gallons of oil products in aboveground containers or more than 42,000 gallons of oil products in buried containers that could reasonably be expected to discharge oil into waters of the United States.

Enacting H.R. 311 would ease some compliance requirements for farmers, depending on the capacity of oil product containers located on a farm and whether a farm has previously experienced any spills. Specifically, under the bill, certification of compliance with the EPA rule by a professional engineer would only be required if the farm has an individual tank with a storage capacity greater than 10,000 gallons, has an aggregate storage capacity greater than or equal to 42,000 gallons, or has previously experienced a spill. However, an owner or operator of a farm could provide self-certification with the SPCC rule if the farm has an aggregate storage capacity greater than 10,000 gallons, but less than 42,000 gallons, and has no history of spills. Farms with an aggregate capacity of less than or equal to 10,000 gallons and no history of a spill would be exempt from all requirements of the SPCC rule.

Based on information from EPA, CBO estimates that implementing and enforcing the SPCC rule as it pertains to farmers under current law will cost $2 million over the next five years. Enacting this bill would exempt the majority of farms from complying with the rule and also would require EPA to amend the SPCC rule for farms and develop guidance and outreach material to educate affected stakeholders. CBO expects that the resources necessary to support the existing rule over the next five years would instead be used to implement H.R. 311.

Pay-as-you-go procedures do not apply to H.R. 311 because enacting the bill would not affect direct spending or revenues.

H.R. 311 contains no intergovernmental or private-sector mandates as defined in the Unfunded Mandates Reform Act and would not affect the budgets of state, local, or tribal governments.

== Procedural history ==
The Farmers Undertake Environmental Land Stewardship Act was introduced into the United States House of Representatives on January 18, 2013 by Rep. Eric A. "Rick" Crawford (R, AR-1). It was referred to the United States House Committee on Transportation and Infrastructure and the United States House Transportation Subcommittee on Water Resources and Environment. The committee unanimous passed the bill. It was reported by the committee alongside House Report 113-375 on March 6, 2014. On March 7, 2014, House Majority Leader Eric Cantor announced that H.R. 311 would be considered under a suspension of the rules on March 11, 2014.

== Debate and discussion ==
The National Cattlemen's Beef Association supported the bill. The organization's president said that they were "pleased" that the "bill will keep many of our producers from having to undertake excess costs as a result of the EPA's overregulation."

Some Senators supported altering the SPCC rule's application to farmers, noting that rule was originally meant to regulate energy production not farms. They noted that "Congress has clearly established its intent to limit the impact of the SPCC rule on the agricultural sector, and to ultimately exempt the majority of it from having to comply." The Senate has already passed legislation that would change this rule.

== See also ==
- List of bills in the 113th United States Congress
