= Mushroom Council =

U.S. organization of fresh mushroom producers

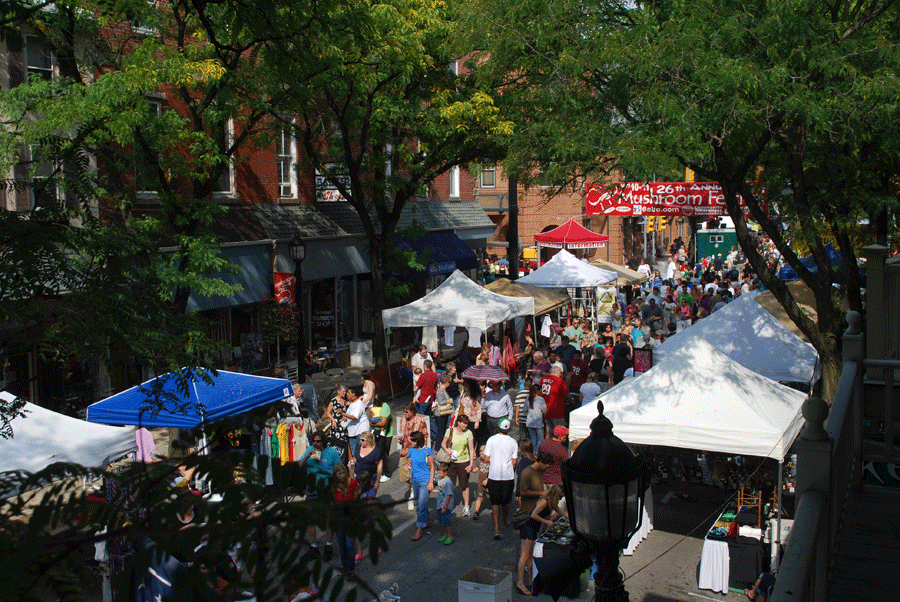
The Mushroom Council helped get September declared National Mushroom Month; its origins can be traced to the Mushroom Festival in Kennett Square, Pennsylvania, pictured here.

The Mushroom Council is a U.S. organization of fresh mushroom producers created and funded through a commodity checkoff program.

== Purpose ==
The Mushroom Council funds mushroom research and promotion programs through a levy on mushroom producers and importers. The council uses the funds for programs such as public relations and advertising as well as communications through retail outlets and restaurants. The council's activities support its goals which include getting people to buy and use mushrooms as often as they do vegetables.

== History ==
The Mushroom Council was created as part of the Mushroom Promotion, Research & Consumer Information Act of 1990 which was signed into law on November 28, 1990, by President George H. W. Bush. The Mushroom Promotion, Research, and Consumer Information Order, part of the act that created the Mushroom Council, did not actually take effect until January 8, 1993. The delay in implementation was due to a comment period and a referendum among growers and importers to authorize the checkoff program. Another referendum on whether or not to continue the program was held in 1998. About 70 percent of producers and importers cast a ballot in the referendum and continuing the mushroom checkoff program was approved by 80 percent.

== National Mushroom Month ==
The Mushroom Council played a role in getting the month of September declared National Mushroom Month. The origins of National Mushroom Month can be traced to the Mushroom Festival in Kennett Square, Pennsylvania, during the second week of September. Beginning in 1992 official proclamations from the U.S. Secretary of Agriculture and the Governor of Pennsylvania declared September as National Mushroom Month. The Mushroom Council supports National Mushroom Month through public and media outreach including social media and a website highlighting mushroom uses.

== Funding ==
The council is funded through an assessment on all mushroom producers and importers who average over 500,000 pounds of the crop per year. Mushroom producers in all 50 states, Puerto Rico and the District of Columbia are assessed a $.005 per pound fee, those producing or importing less than 500,000 pounds of mushrooms are exempted from the fee. For calendar year 2014 the council's budget was $4.2 million.
