= National Pork Producers Council =

Organization in Washington D.C., United States

- Abbreviation: NPPC
- Formation: Tax-exempt since May 1970; 56 years ago
- Type: 501(c)(5)
- Tax ID no.: EIN: 420796455
- Headquarters: Des Moines
- Region served: United States
- Revenue: 26,182,166 USD (2024)
- Expenses: 27,177,778 USD (2024)
- Website: nppc.org

NATIONAL PORK PRODUCERS COUNCIL PORK PAC
- Formation: January 30, 1986; 40 years ago
- Registration no.: C00201871
- Revenue: 662,902 (2023-2024)

The National Pork Producers Council is a trade association representing U.S. pork producers and other industry stakeholders. It lobbies on behalf of its affiliated state associations from its headquarters in Des Moines, Iowa.

== History ==
The National Pork Producers Council was formed in 1954 as a 501(c)(3) charitable organization. In 1970, it established itself as a 501(c)(5), a trade association which is allowed to lobby, unlike the previous designation of charitable organization.

On January 1, 1986, it became the national-level recipient of pork checkoff funds.

== Issues ==
According to NPPC's website, its mission is to "fight for legislation and regulations, develop revenue and market opportunities and protect the livelihoods of America’s more than 60,000 pork producers. Public policy priority issues include those relating to animal health and food safety, environment and energy, and international trade."

Beyond legislation and regulation, NPPC is involved in the political process through a political action committee, PorkPAC. The PAC seeks to educate the public and support candidates at the state and federal levels who support the pork industry.

The NPPC supports a variety of housing systems, including gestation crates and open pen housing, each of which has advantages and disadvantages concerning animal welfare, according to the American Veterinary Medical Association.

NPPC petitioned the Supreme Court of the United States to overturn California's animal protection law Proposition 12, in National Pork Producers Council v. Ross. The court upheld the law.

== Organization ==
NPPC creates ad hoc task forces to study or provide guidance on industry issues. NPPC receives advice and works closely with the meat-packing industry and animal health and feed companies, as well as the National Pork Board. Together, NPPC and NPB have formed joint task forces on certain issues. For example, they worked together in developing the Fat free lean index.
