= Tree Assistance Program =

The Tree Assistance Program (TAP) is an American disaster assistance program, administered by the Farm Service Agency, that makes payments for lost orchard trees and vines that produce annual crops.

The program has been funded on an ad hoc basis, usually by emergency supplemental appropriations. Most recently, the program was funded for losses incurred between October 1, 1997, and September 30, 1998.

The Agricultural Act of 2014 (also known as the 2014 Farm Bill) authorized the Tree Assistance Program (TAP) to provide financial assistance to qualifying orchardists and nursery tree growers to replant or rehabilitate eligible trees, bushes and vines damaged by natural disasters. It also made TAP a permanent disaster program and provides retroactive authority to cover eligible losses back to Oct. 1, 2011.

The Bipartisan Budget Act of 2018 also updated TAP, removing the per person and legal entity program year payment limitation ceiling of $125,000. It increased the acreage cap, and growers are eligible to be partly reimbursed for losses on up to 1,000 acres per program year, double the previous acreage.
