= Agricultural Act of 2014 =

United States federal law

Federal Agriculture Reform and Risk Management Act of 2013
- Long title: To provide for the reform and continuation of agricultural and other programs of the Department of Agriculture through fiscal year 2018, and for other purposes.
- Nicknames: The 2014 farm bill
- Announced in: the 113th United States Congress
- Sponsored by: Frank Lucas (R–OK)

Codification
- Acts amended: Food Security Act of 1985, Federal Agriculture Reform and Risk Management Act of 2013, Federal Crop Insurance Act, Food, Conservation, and Energy Act of 2008, Farm Security and Rural Investment Act of 2002, and others.
- Titles amended: 7 U.S.C.: Agriculture
- U.S.C. sections amended: 7 U.S.C. § 1508, 7 U.S.C. § 450i, 7 U.S.C. § 1926, 7 U.S.C. § 1308, 7 U.S.C. § 2279, and others.
- Agencies affected: Under Secretary of Agriculture for Farm and Foreign Agricultural Services, Social Security Administration, Economic Research Service, United States Secretary of Agriculture, Agricultural Research Service, United States Department of Justice, Office of the Inspector General, United States Department of Agriculture, United States Agency for International Development, General Services Administration, United States Forest Service, U.S. Customs and Border Protection, USDA, Office of the Chief Economist, Risk Management Agency, Executive Office of the President, United States Environmental Protection Agency, Natural Resources Conservation Service, United States Department of Labor, United States Congress, Farm Service Agency, National Agricultural Statistics Service, Office of Management and Budget, United States Department of Commerce, Commodity Credit Corporation, United States Department of Transportation, Rural Utilities Service, United States Department of the Interior, United States Department of Education, Department of Health and Human Services, Bureau of Land Management, Federal Emergency Management Agency, Federal Crop Insurance Corporation, United States Department of the Army, U.S. Fish and Wildlife Service, Food and Drug Administration
- Authorizations of appropriations: At least $27,137,750,000 with an additional unlimited amount
- Appropriations: $1,200,000,000

Legislative history
- Introduced in the United States House of Representatives as the "Federal Agriculture Reform and Risk Management Act of 2013" (H.R. 2642) by Frank Lucas (R–OK) on July 10, 2013; Committee consideration by United States Senate Committee on Agriculture, Nutrition and Forestry, United States House Committee on Agriculture; Passed the United States House on July 11, 2013 (216–208); Passed the United States Senate on July 18, 2013 (Unanimous consent, with amendment and request for conference); Reported by the joint conference committee on January 27, 2014; agreed to by the United States House on January 29, 2014 (251–166) and by the United States Senate on February 4, 2014 (68–32); Signed into law by President Barack Obama on February 7, 2014

The Agricultural Act of 2014 (also known as the 2014 U.S. Farm Bill, formerly the Federal Agriculture Reform and Risk Management Act of 2013) is an act of Congress that authorizes nutrition and agriculture programs in the United States for the years of 2014–2018. The bill authorizes $956 billion in spending over the next ten years.

The bill passed in the U.S. House of Representatives on January 29, 2014, and the U.S. Senate on February 4, 2014, during the 113th Congress. President Barack Obama signed the bill into law on February 7, 2014. The bill is considered two years late, since farm bills are traditionally passed every five years. The previous farm bill, Food, Conservation, and Energy Act of 2008, expired in 2012.

== Background ==
=== Farm bills ===
In the United States, the farm bill is the primary agricultural and food policy tool of the federal government. The comprehensive omnibus bill is passed every five years or so by the United States Congress and deals with both agriculture and all other affairs under the purview of the United States Department of Agriculture. It usually makes amendments and suspensions to provisions of permanent law, reauthorizes, amends, or repeals provisions of preceding temporary agricultural acts, and puts forth new policy provisions for a limited time into the future. Beginning in 1973, farm bills have included titles on commodity programs, trade, rural development, farm credit, conservation, agricultural research, food and nutrition programs, marketing, etc. Farm bills can be highly controversial and can impact international trade, environmental conservation, food safety, and the well-being of rural communities. The agricultural subsidy programs mandated by the farm bills are the subject of intense debate both within the U.S. and internationally.

The farm bill was first created during the Great Depression to give financial assistance to farmers who were struggling due to an excess crop supply creating low prices, and also to control and ensure an adequate food supply. The first farm bill, known as the Agriculture Adjustment Act (AAA), was passed by Congress in 1933 as a part of Franklin D. Roosevelt's New Deal. The Food, Conservation, and Energy Act of 2008 is the most recent farm bill, prior to this one.

== Provisions of the bill ==
The bill includes cuts to Supplemental Nutrition Assistance Program (SNAP), commonly known as "food stamps". According to The New York Times, the $8 billion in cuts will mean that 850,000 households will lose $90/month in benefits. However, the bill increases funding to food banks by $200 million. SNAP is the largest portion of spending in the bill. The $8 billion in cuts comes from setting a minimum of $20 per year for the Low Income Home Energy Assistance Program (LIHEAP) to receive the Standard Utility Allowance (SUA) deduction, disallow medical marijuana as a deduction and ruling that lottery winners and persons convicted of certain crimes (murder, aggravated sexual abuse, sexual assault, and sexual exploitation and other abuse of children) can't get food stamps. However, the bill would start a new pilot program to encourage people on food stamps to try to find jobs. The bill also authorized the Tree Assistance Program (TAP) to provide financial assistance to qualifying orchardists and nursery tree growers to replant or rehabilitate eligible trees, bushes and vines damaged by natural disasters. The 2014 Farm Bill made TAP a permanent disaster program and provided retroactive authority to cover eligible losses back to Oct. 1, 2011.

The bill places income caps on farm subsidies, has a price support program for dairy farmers and ends direct payment subsidies, which paid farmers whether or not they actually grew any crops. This subsidy had cost $5 billion a year. The Agricultural Act of 2014 also contained the Christmas Tree Research and Promotion Order, a commodity checkoff program that established the Christmas Tree Promotion Board.

=== Spending ===
According to Brad Plumer at The Washington Post, the spending in the bill (FY 2014–2023) breaks down in the following manner:

Area	Amount
Food stamps and nutrition	$756 billion
Crop insurance	$89.8 billion
Conservation	$56 billion
Commodity programs	$44.4 billion
Everything else	$8.2 billion

In total, this spending represents about 2.1% of projected federal spending over that time period.

== Congressional Budget Office report ==
Effects on direct spending and revenues of the conference agreement on H.R. 2642, as reported on January 27, 2014.

This summary is based largely on the summary provided by the Congressional Budget Office about the effects on direct spending and revenues of the conference agreement on H.R. 2642, as reported on January 27, 2014. This is a public domain source.

The Congressional Budget Office (CBO) estimates that direct spending stemming from the programs authorized by the conference agreement would total $956 billion over the 2014-2023 period, of which $756 billion would be for nutrition programs. Relative to spending and revenues projected under the CBO's May 2013 baseline, the CBO estimates that enacting the conference agreement would lower budget deficits by $16.6 billion over that 10-year period. The CBO reported that original House version, Federal Agriculture Reform and Risk Management Act of 2013 (H.R. 1947; 113th Congress), would have reduced direct spending by $51.8 billion and increased revenues by $60 million. The original Senate version, Agriculture Reform, Food, and Jobs Act of 2013 (S. 954; 113th Congress), would have decreased direct spending by $17.7 billion and increased revenues by $50 million.

Most spending under the legislation would stem from provisions regarding nutrition (title IV), crop insurance (title XI), commodity programs (title I), and conservation programs (title II).

Title I — Commodities. CBO estimates that enacting title I would reduce spending on commodity programs by $14.3 billion over the 2014-2023 period, $3 billion to $4 billion less than under the House- and Senate- passed bills. The conference agreement, as well as both the House and Senate bills, would end fixed payments and certain other existing forms of price and income support to producers. They would all establish new programs that would require producers to choose between price supports or a guarantee of some of their expected revenue.

Title IV — Nutrition. Title IV of the conference agreement would reduce nutrition spending by $8 billion over the 2014-2023 period, CBO estimates. The House-passed bill would reduce such spending by $39 billion over the 10-year period. It includes two provisions not contained in the conference agreement that would reduce spending on the Supplemental Nutrition Assistance Program (SNAP) by restricting the definition of categorical eligibility for the program and reducing the number of waivers from work requirements available for certain adult SNAP recipients. The Senate-passed bill would reduce nutrition spending by $4 billion over the next 10 years, about half the reduction in the conference agreement. It contains a proposal to limit heating and cooling allowances for SNAP participants that is less restrictive than the provision include in the conference agreement.

Title XI — Crop Insurance. The conference agreement's provisions on crop insurance would increase costs by $5.7 billion over the 2014-2023 period, CBO estimates. Total spending for crop insurance over the 2014-2023 period would increase by about $9 billion under the House-passed legislation and by about $5 billion under the Senate-passed legislation.

This estimate does not include the additional discretionary spending for agricultural programs that would result from implementing the conference agreement; such spending would be subject to future appropriation actions. CBO also has not reviewed the conference agreement for intergovernmental or private-sector mandates.

== Procedural history ==
Agricultural Act of 2014 Conference Report to Accompany H.R. 2642

=== Legislation in 2013 ===
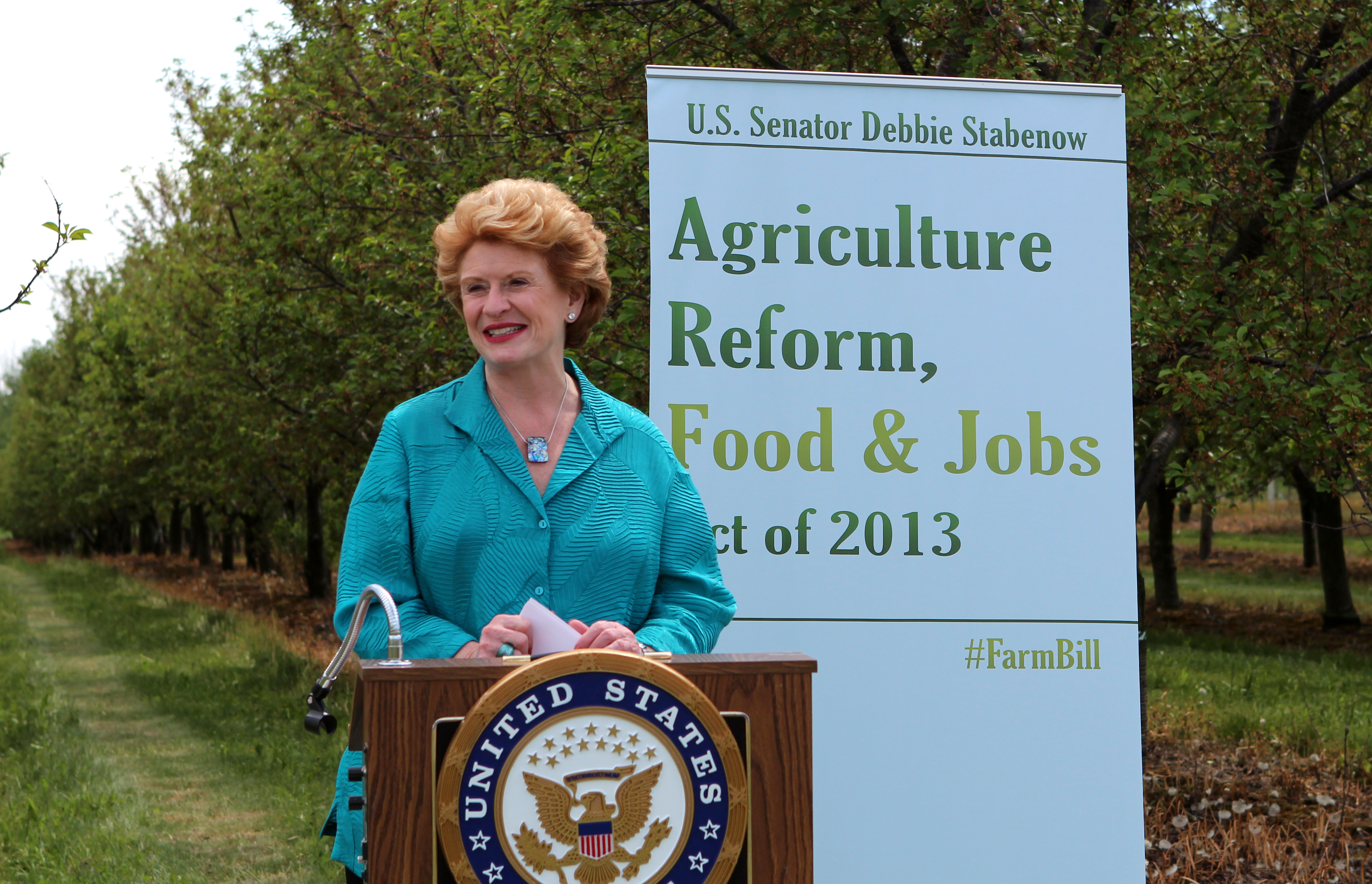
Debbie Stabenow in Acme Township, Michigan campaigning in support of the bill

The original version of the Federal Agriculture Reform and Risk Management Act of 2013 was introduced as H.R. 1947 by Rep. Frank Lucas (R-OK), chair of the House Agricultural Committee, on May 13, 2013. On June 17, 2013, President Barack Obama released a statement of administration policy announcing that the Administration "strongly opposes" the Federal Agriculture Reform and Risk Management Act of 2013. The statement provided three specific criticisms. First, the bill would cut some of the funding for Supplemental Nutrition Assistance Program (SNAP), a federal program that provides money for food for low income Americans. Second, the bill would need meet the president's expectations for commodity and crop reforms. Third, the bill would not provide funding for renewable energy. The memo concludes with the statement that "if the President were presented with H.R. 1947, his senior advisors would recommend that he veto the bill." On June 20, 2013, the bill was rejected by the House in a vote of 195–234. Only 24 Democrats voted in favor of the bill, with most voting against due to its cuts to the Supplemental Nutrition Assistance Program. 62 Republicans voted against the bill, defecting from their own party. Comments made by the House Republican leadership immediately following the vote suggested that they had expected more Democratic support. Since they hadn't received it, they indicated they would be rewriting the bill to appeal more to the conservative Republicans whose votes they lost.

In light of the failure of the House version of the farm bill to pass, attention has shifted to focus on the reaction of the House to the Senate-passed draft farm bill, known as the Agriculture Reform, Food, and Jobs Act of 2013 (S. 954). This is the bill that was introduced into the United States Senate on May 14, 2013, by Sen. Debbie Stabenow (D-MI). The bill was considered on the Senate floor on May 21–23, and June 3–4, June 6, and June 10, 2013. On June 10, 2013, the bill passed in the Senate 66-27 with support of the president. Only two Democrats voted against their party: Senator Sheldon Whitehouse (D-RI) and Senator Jack Reed (D-RI). Eighteen Republicans voted in favor of the bill. However, the Senate bill failed to pass in the House, so the two chambers organized a conference committee. One of the major provisions of the Agriculture Reform, Food, and Jobs Act of 2013 was a $4 billion cut to the Supplemental Nutrition Assistance Program, a controversial provision, with some Democrats arguing that the cuts were too large, while some Republicans arguing that the cuts did not do enough to cut the deficit.

The second version of the Federal Agriculture Reform and Risk Management Act of 2013 (version H.R. 2642) was introduced into the United States House of Representatives on July 10, 2013, by Lucas. On July 11, 2013, the House voted to pass the bill 216–208, after several failed attempts were made to delay or amend the bill. The United States Senate received the bill on July 16, 2013. On July 18, 2013, the Senate voted to amend the bill by replacing most of it with language from their proposed farm bill, the Agriculture Reform, Food, and Jobs Act of 2013. The amended bill passed the Senate by unanimous consent on July 18, 2013, and the Senate requested a conference with the House on the bill. The Senate selected Senators Stabenow, Leahy, Harkin, Baucus, Brown, Klobuchar, Bennet, Cochran, Chambliss, Roberts, Boozman, and Hoeven as their conferees.

=== Conference committee ===
Eventually, on October 12, 2013, the House agreed to a conference on the bill and conferees were chosen:

- Steve Southerland (R-FL)
- Marcia Fudge (D-OH)
- Dave Camp (R-OH)
- Sam Johnson (R-TX)
- Sander Levin (D-Mich.)
- Ed Royce (R-CA)
- Tom Marino (R-PA.)
- Eliot Engel (D-NY)
- Frank Lucas (R-OK)
- Steve King (R-IA)
- Randy Neugebauer (R-TX)
- Michael D. Rogers (R-Ala.)
- Mike Conaway (R-TX)
- Glenn Thompson (R-PA)
- Austin Scott (R-GA)
- Rick Crawford (R-AR)
- Martha Roby (R-Ala.)
- Kristi Noem (R-SD)
- Jeff Denham (R-CA)
- Rodney Davis (R-Ill.)
- Collin Peterson (D-MN)
- Mike McIntyre (D-NC)
- Jim Costa (D-CA)
- Tim Walz (D-MN)
- Kurt Schrader (D-Ore.)
- Jim McGovern (D-MA)
- Suzan DelBene (D-WA)
- Gloria Negrete McLeod (D-CA)
- Filemon Vela Jr. (D-TX)

On January 27, 2014, the Conference Committee report was released. On January 29, 2014, the House voted 251–166 to pass the bill. In the House, a majority of Republicans voted in favor of the bill (163–62) and the Democrats split almost evenly (89–103). The Senate then voted 68–32 on February 4, 2014, to approve the full five-year farm bill, sending it to President Barack Obama to be signed into law.

== Debate and discussion ==
Senator Debbie Stabenow argued in favor of the Senate bill because it both reduced the deficit and supported "16 million people who depend on agriculture for their jobs".

The Senate bill was opposed by groups focusing on hunger due to its reduction in spending on food stamps. It was also criticized by groups, including The Heritage Foundation for including a system of crop insurance that were less about helping farmers in the event of a true disaster and more of an income support system.

Senator John McCain (R-AZ) criticized the Senate bill for containing a catfish inspection program that he believes duplicates one that is already conducted by the Food and Drug Administration.

Both Speaker of the House John Boehner and Majority Leader Eric Cantor supported the bill and asked other Republicans to do so. However, both men indicated they would have preferred additional changes.

On January 29, 2014, after passage in the House, it was considered "unclear" what President Obama thought of the farm bill because he had previously "signaled his opposition to any bill that cut food stamps and expanded crop insurance."

Feeding America said that the cuts to food stamps would "result in 34 lost meals per month for the affected households."

== See also ==
- List of bills in the 113th United States Congress
