= Rodeo (ballet) =

Ballet scored by Aaron Copland and choreographed by Agnes de Mille

- Choreographer: Agnes de Mille
- Music: Aaron Copland
- Premiere: 16 October 1942; Metropolitan Opera House, New York City
- Characters: American Cowgirl; Champion Roper; Head Wrangler; Rancher's Daughter
- Design: Oliver Smith
- Setting: 19th Century American Southwest
- Created for: Ballet Russe de Monte Carlo

Rodeo is a ballet composed by Aaron Copland and choreographed by Agnes de Mille, which premiered in 1942. Subtitled "The Courting at Burnt Ranch", the ballet consists of five sections: "Buckaroo Holiday", "Corral Nocturne", "Ranch House Party", "Saturday Night Waltz", and "Hoe-Down". The symphonic version omits "Ranch House Party", leaving the other sections relatively intact.

== Genesis ==
The original ballet was choreographed by Agnes de Mille for the Ballet Russe de Monte-Carlo, a dance company that moved to the United States during World War II. In order to compete with the rival company Ballet Theatre, the Ballet Russe commissioned de Mille out of a career of relative obscurity. The choreographer was given considerable creative control, choosing Aaron Copland as the composer after being impressed by his previous ballet, Billy the Kid. Though Copland was initially reluctant to compose "another Cowboy ballet," De Mille persuaded him that this show would mark a significant departure from his previous work. As de Mille found herself occupied with instructing a highly international cast in the mannerisms of American cowboys, Copland recommended that Oliver Smith design the sets, in what would prove to be a prescient action.

De Mille herself played the lead, and the premiere at the Metropolitan Opera House on 16 October 1942 received 22 curtain calls. The other principal dancers in the cast included Frederic Franklin and Casimir Kokitch. Though de Mille herself was not entirely pleased with the premiere, it was attended by Rodgers and Hammerstein, who approached de Mille afterward to request that she choreograph their upcoming production of Oklahoma!.

The ballet makes use of riding movements that de Mille devised with the assistance of Peggy van Praagh, for a recital in London by Peggy van Praagh and Hugh Laing in 1938. De Mille also made use of such vernacular forms as a square dance and a cadenza for a tap dancer.

Noted among many reviews was de Mille's highly evocative choreography, described as "film sensibility" and renowned for its realism. The original production went on to lead a successful tour, though producers were hard pressed to replicate the skill with which de Mille had portrayed the lead. De Mille retained veto power over any casting of the ballet, which often sent companies to extremes in order to find a worthy Cowgirl. Meanwhile, Copland arranged the music as a symphonic suite for orchestra titled Four Dance Episodes from Rodeo, which consisted chiefly of removing "Ranch House Party" and minor adjustments to the final two sections. With the middle section removed, the composition resembled the symphonic form with an ambitious opening movement, slow movement, minuet and finale. In this form, Rodeo found even greater success, premiering at the Boston Pops in 1943.

== Instrumentation ==
Rodeo is written for the following instrumentation.

Woodwind
3 flutes (2nd and 3rd doubling 2 piccolos)
2 oboes
English horn
2 B♭ clarinets
bass clarinet
2 bassoons
contrabassoon
Brass
4 horns
3 B♭ trumpets
3 trombones
1 tuba

Percussion
timpani
glockenspiel
xylophone
1 pair of crash cymbals
suspended cymbal
triangle
woodblock
whip
bass drum
snare drum
piano (doubling on celesta)

Strings
harp

16 1st violins
16 2nd violins
12 violas
10 cellos
8 double basses

Onstage: upright honkey-tonk piano

== Structure and analysis ==
The circumstances surrounding the composition of Rodeo led to its having a number of features that set it apart from other Copland compositions. Though many of Copland's works incorporate traditional American folk tunes, Rodeo is unique in that it leaves them quite intact in the score, with very little alteration on the part of the composer. This is likely attributable in part to De Mille's control over the work. Indeed, she had already blocked the entire show before Copland had written a single note and also transcribed several folk tunes, including "Old Paint", for Copland in addition to her blocking notes.

The well-known main theme of "Hoe-Down" is based on a unique version of the American folk song "Bonyparte" or "Bonaparte's Retreat," played by Salyersville, Kentucky fiddler William Hamilton Stepp, which was recorded in 1937 by Alan Lomax for the Library of Congress. A meticulous transcription by Ruth Crawford Seeger of that performance appeared in Lomax's 1941 book, "Our Singing Country".

Many of the themes were autobiographical for De Mille. An extremely skilled dancer, the choreographer nonetheless felt awkward in the offstage world, and the Cowgirl's unwillingness to subscribe to traditional gender roles mirrors De Mille's experience.

=== Buckaroo Holiday ===
"Buckaroo Holiday"
A 25 second sample of the "Buckaroo Holiday" movement demonstrating the rhythmic motif of the main "Rodeo" theme.

Rodeo opens with a grand fanfare, vamping until R5-6, where the woodwinds introduce the Cowgirl's theme. This quiet theme continues until the Rodeo theme begins presenting a highly rhythmic motif that evokes the trotting of horses. The lone Cowgirl seeks the affections of the Head Wrangler, who is rather taken with the more feminine Rancher's Daughter. The cowboys enter to the railroad tune of "Sis Joe", envisioned by de Mille as an event "like thunder," which Copland obliges with heavy drums and brass. As the cowgirl seeks the attention of her quarry, she mimics the surrounding cowboys, reflected in the heavy use of the tune "If He'd Be a Buckaroo" in this section. The theme is repeated by various solo instruments before being realized in triple canon by the full orchestra. After a brief return to the quiet Cowgirl theme, the fanfare returns. "Sis Joe" reappears again, before the entire orchestra triumphantly plays "If He'd be a Buckaroo".

=== Corral Nocturne ===
"Corral Nocturne"
A 24 second sample of "Corral Nocturne" demonstrating the lyrical interplay of the oboe and bassoon to create the mood of a lovesick character.

The "Corral Nocturne" invokes the lovesick musings of the Cowgirl, portrayed rather lyrically by Copland's heavy use of oboe and bassoon. In writing this scene, de Mille noted that "She run[s] through the empty corrals intoxicated with space, her feet thudding in the stillness." The Head Wrangler discovers her in the darkness, but she does not come toward him as the Rancher's Daughter would. Confused, he exits with the Rancher's Daughter.

=== Ranch House Party ===
The subsequent "Ranch House Party" (ballet only) was envisioned by de Mille as "Dance music inside. Night music outside." Indeed, the section (written by Leonard Bernstein on behalf of an overworked Copland) opens with a honky-tonk theme played on a piano, accompanied by a more thoughtful clarinet. The Cowgirl finds herself between the Champion Roper and the Wrangler, who are attracted to the Rancher's Daughter. "Corral Nocturne" is recalled at the end of this section, as the Cowgirl finds herself quite alone.

=== Saturday Night Waltz ===
"Saturday Night Waltz"
A 16 second sample of "Saturday Night Waltz" demonstrating the subtle use of single woodwind instruments over a bed of strings to represent the characters.

While the "Texas minuet" of the "Saturday Night Waltz" plays de Mille's transcribed version of "I Ride an Old Paint" (also known as "Houlihan") the cowboys and their girls pair off. Expectant of a partner and finding none, the Cowgirl is alone until the Champion Roper approaches her, having failed to best the Wrangler in winning the affections of the Rancher's Daughter. Both this section and the "Corral Nocturne" feature Copland's characteristic economy of sound, where he uses solo instruments in lieu of entire sections.

=== Hoe-Down ===
"Hoe-Down"
A 20 second sample of "Hoe-Down" demonstrating the main theme of the movement with the horns providing counterpoint to the main string melody.

Finally, the "Hoe-Down" opens by vamping the first bar of William Hamilton Stepp's interpretation of the folk tune "Bonaparte's Retreat", which will become a major theme of the section. After a reprisal of the Rodeo theme, the theme proper begins in the strings, as the horns play a simple counterpoint. Instead of building to a climax, this section segues into "Miss McLeod's Reel", performed by various solo instruments. Copland briefly introduces the Irish theme "Gilderoy" in the clarinet and oboe.

Building toward the end, Copland reintroduces "Bonaparte's Retreat" in canon, before returning to the Rodeo theme, which slows into the climactic kiss between the Cowgirl and the Roper. "Bonaparte's Retreat" is then resumed by the full orchestra, which ends the piece with a grand fanfare.

== Ballet and its place in the repertoire ==
In what is considered one of the earliest examples of a truly American ballet, Rodeo combines the exuberance of a Broadway musical with the disciplines of classical ballet. Of particular note, the first scene requires men to pantomime riding and roping while dancing solo and dancing in groups (not very common for male ballet dancers), and while interacting with an awkward Cowgirl, who seeks their acceptance. The cast dresses in stylized western garb, which makes it all the more difficult to execute many of the moves.

Classical ballet storylines typically involve some boy-meets-girl relationship, or at most a love triangle. But Rodeo forces an American Cowgirl to compete against an army of local girls in a quest to win the attention of the Champion Roper. The pairing and mutual attraction of the men and women in the cast appears fluid, and at times confusing to the rejected Cowgirl. Against this backdrop, the Cowgirl emotes strength, awkwardness, confidence, femininity and vulnerability, while executing rapid-fire footwork and pantomime, which mimics the bronco-busting of the men. Any comic dancer who plays the Cowgirl must succeed at being a failure, only to emerge triumphant in the end when she finally dons a dress for dance night.

Regarding this nuanced role, DeMille said: "She acts like a boy, not to be a boy, but to be liked by the boys."

The American Ballet Notes for its 1950 premiere performance (Hessisches Staatstheater Wiesbaden, Germany) state: Rodeo ... is a love story of the American Southwest. The problem it deals with is perennial: how an American girl, with the odds seemingly all against her, sets out to get herself a man. The girl in this case is a cowgirl, a tomboy whose desperate efforts to become one of the ranch's cowhands create a problem for the cowboys and make her the laughingstock of womankind.

As noted above, finding suitable Cowgirls to play this role was a challenge. Lucia Chase recalls that when the Ballet Theater Company had exclusive rights to stage Rodeo, Agnes DeMille urged the employment of "charming and talented comediennes from the Broadway musical stage" for the role. In the ballet world, DeMille's favorites for the role were: Dorothy Etheridge (Ballet Russe de Monte Carlo), Jenny Workman (The Ballet Theater Company), Carole Valleskey (Joffrey Ballet), Bonnie Wyckoff (Boston Ballet) and Christine Sarry (American Ballet Theatre).

In the 1970s, Christine Sarry emerged as DeMille's preferred interpreter of this complex role, DeMille even preferring Sarry's version to her own. Agnes DeMille stated in her will that only Sarry was authorized to approve of dancers who could take up the role of the Cowgirl. Since Agnes DeMille's death, Sarry has coached and approved numerous dancers in the part. In the 21st century, the list includes: Tina LeBlanc (San Francisco Ballet, 2006), Kristin Long (San Francisco Ballet, 2007); Xiomara Reyes (American Ballet Theatre, 2006); Marian Butler (American Ballet Theatre, 2006); and Erica Cornejo (American Ballet Theatre, 2005). Of Ms. Cornejo, critic Jerry Hochman wrote, "Cornejo owns the role now".

Up to 1979, Rodeo was staged mainly by deMille and Vernon Lusby, for many years one of her most trusted assistants on numerous projects. When illness precluded his ability to continue setting Rodeo in 1981, deMille asked Paul Sutherland, a former principal dancer with American Ballet Theatre, Joffrey Ballet, and Harkness Ballet who had danced leading roles in several of her ballets, to begin staging Rodeo. With the passing of Agnes deMille in 1993, ownership and all rights to Rodeo passed to her son, Jonathan Prude. For the next several years, several people staged the ballet. In 1999, Prude set up the deMille Committee to oversee her numerous works and assigned sole responsibility for staging Rodeo to Sutherland, including the selection of dancers, rehearsals and stage production. With the exception of a few companies to whom Agnes deMille had, years before, given the ballet in perpetuity, Sutherland has staged Rodeo over fifty times for dozens of companies and universities throughout the United States and Canada as well as in Antwerp, Belgium, and continues to do so.

For a point of comparison, it has been nearly 120 years since the premiere of The Nutcracker, and more than 70 years since the premiere of Rodeo. This increasing longevity, plus the anchoring of Copland's score in American culture, suggests near-certain permanence for the ballet.

== In popular culture ==
"Hoedown"

Single by Emerson, Lake & Palmer

from the album Trilogy
- Released: 1972
- Genre: Progressive rock; country rock
- Length: 3:47
- Label: Island (Europe); Cotillion (US/Canada); Atlantic (International)
- Songwriters: Aaron Copland, arr. Keith Emerson, Greg Lake, Carl Palmer
- Producer: Greg Lake

Emerson, Lake & Palmer singles chronology
"From the Beginning" (1972)	"Hoedown" (1972)	"Jerusalem" (1973)

The progressive rock band Emerson, Lake & Palmer recorded a version of "Hoe-Down" (with the title changed slightly to "Hoedown") for their 1972 album Trilogy. In a review of Trilogy, François Couture of AllMusic called ELP's version of "Hoedown" a "crowd-pleaser".

"Hoe-Down" served as the basis for the soundtrack cue "In Training" from the film An American Tail: Fievel Goes West, composed by James Horner.
