= National Pork Board =

US pork promotion and research program

The National Pork Board is a program sponsored by the United States Department of Agriculture Agricultural Marketing Service whose purpose is to provide consumer information, perform industry-related research, and promote pork as a food product. The board's activities are funded by a mandatory commodity checkoff program, which requires hog producers to pay a small percentage-based fee each time an animal is sold.

== History ==
The Pork Board was established by the Pork Promotion, Research and Consumer Information Act of 1985, also known as the Pork Act, which was included as part of the 1985 Congressional Farm Bill. It became effective January 1, 1986.

The program is administered by the Agricultural Marketing Service of the United States Department of Agriculture. Its 15 members are chosen by the United States Secretary of Agriculture, based on nominations received from the Pork Act Delegate Body. The Secretary approves the annual plans of the Board.

In 1987, the Board introduced its "Pork. The Other White Meat" advertising program as a means of promoting pork as a lean meat to health-conscious consumers. Pork sales in the United States rose 20%, reaching $30 billion annually by 1991.

Data collected by the USDA's Economic Research Service showed that pork consumption following the introduction of the Board's promotion programs had risen from 45.6 pounds (20.7 kg) per capita in 1987 and reaching a peak of 49.3 pounds (22.4 kg) per person in 1999, dropping to 48.5 pounds (22.0 kg) in 2003. By contrast, beef consumption had declined from 69.5 pounds (31.5 kg) per American in 1987 to 62 pounds (28 kg) in 2003.

== Finance ==
The national checkoff began in 1986 with a rate of 0.25% (25 cents per $100) that was increased to 0.35% in 1991, and to 0.45% in 1995. As of 2017, the checkoff rate was 0.40% — 40 cents for every $100 at market rate — of the value of all pork products manufactured in the United States or imported into the country. The current rate has been in place since 2002, when the rate was decreased by .05%.

Despite $4 million spent to support the retention of the checkoff, a referendum held in 2000 among hog farmers voted to eliminate the checkoff, which funded the $50 million marketing campaign promoting pork. Ann Veneman, the Secretary of Agriculture, voided the results, citing problems with petitions filed in advance of the referendum.

Lawsuits have attempted to eliminate commodity checkoff programs as unconstitutional under the doctrines of free speech and free association. The compelled speech arguments have been addressed by the United States Supreme Court in cases involving checkoff programs for growers of tree fruits, mushrooms, and beef, but the programs have been determined to be permitted under certain circumstances. (The free association has not been directly addressed.)

Use of the slogan "The Other White Meat" ended in 2011. The board continued to pay $3 million per year to the National Pork Producers Council.

== Controversies ==
The USDA, which approves the board's purchases and approves each annual payment, was sued in 2012 by the Humane Society of the United States, which tried to stop the payments from continuing. USDA subsequently determined that the value of "The Other White Meat" trademark was worth between $113 million and $132 million.

Critics contend that the Pork Board has exhibited unlawful coordination with policy and advocacy groups. Specifically, they allege the Pork Board has funneled $60 million to the National Pork Producers Council (NPPC) to fund prohibited lobbying by paying for a trademark which the group no longer uses. It has also exhibited questionable financial activity by maintaining a portion of its budget for “Operating Freedom” activities. The NPPC also called the Pork Board its sister organization. The enabling act prohibits use of checkoff funds for lobbying; critics observe that the NPPC is a lobbying organization.

The Board developed a package of environmental audit software. The software was licensed royalty-free to the NPPC, which used it to found a for-profit subsidiary, Validus. Critics complained that this was a subsidy to the NPPC.
