= Commodity checkoff program =

USA industry association of USDA

In the United States, a commodity checkoff program promotes and provides research and information for a particular agricultural commodity without reference to specific producers or brands. It collects funds through a checkoff mechanism that is sometimes called checkoff dollars, from producers of a particular agricultural commodity and uses these funds to promote and do research on that particular commodity. As stated earlier the organizations must promote their commodity in a generic way without reference to a particular producer. Checkoff programs attempt to improve the market position of the covered commodity by expanding markets, increasing demand, and developing new uses and markets. Checkoff programs amount to $750 million per year.

The United States Department of Agriculture is responsible for overseeing the formation of checkoff organizations under the authority of the Commodity, Promotion, Research and Information Act of 1996.

These organizations are responsible for familiar American advertising campaigns, including "Milk Does a Body Good," the Got Milk? milk moustache series, "Pork. The Other White Meat", "The Incredible, Edible Egg", and "Beef: It's What's for Dinner."

Many of these programs are authorized by the Commodity Promotion, Research and Information Act of 1996.

== United States policy ==
The Sheep Promotion, Research, and Information Act of 1994 authorized the creation of the American Lamb Board as a commodity checkoff program.

Because individual producers of nearly homogeneous agricultural commodities cannot easily convince consumers to choose one egg or orange or a single cut of beef over another, they often have joined together in commodity promotion programs to use generic advertising in an effort to expand total demand for the commodity with the objective of helping their own sales as well. Activities are intended to expand both domestic and export demand; examples include advertising, nutrition education, research to improve product quality and appeal, market research studies, and technical assistance. These activities are often self-funded through assessments on marketing – hence, the name commodity check-off programs.

This article provides a state-by-state application of the USDA Agricultural Marketing Service final rule, Soybean Promotion, Research, and Consumer Information; Beef Promotion and Research; Amendments to Allow Redirection of State Assessments to the National Program; Technical Amendments.

== Controversies ==
Congress has permitted producer groups to make checkoffs mandatory, and this aspect has generated legal challenges by some producers, who contend they must pay taxes for activities they would not underwrite voluntarily. The U.S. Supreme Court [in United States v. United Foods, Inc., 533 U.S. 405, 412 (2001)] ruled that the mushroom check-off violated the Constitutional free speech provisions (First Amendment), creating uncertainty about the future of other check-offs. Since then, separate lower federal courts have ruled that various check-offs also are unconstitutional. However, on May 23, 2005, the Supreme Court ruled that the beef check-off does not violate the First Amendment. In its decision, Johanns v. Livestock Marketing Association and Nebraska Cattlemen v. Livestock Marketing Association (Nos. 03-1164 and 03-1165), a majority of the Court agreed with check-off defenders that the programs are in fact "government speech" (an issue that was not considered in the mushroom decision).

"Compelled funding of government speech does not alone raise First Amendment concerns,"..."Citizens may challenge compelled support of private speech, but have no First Amendment right not to fund government speech."

A Montana federal court ruled in June 2017 that the operation of the beef checkoff there was unconstitutional.

In 2008, the American Egg Board attempted to funnel $3 million to oppose a ballot measure in California prohibiting the extreme confinement of farm animals. They were stopped by an injunction issued by a federal court. In 2013, the Egg Board attempted to get government regulators and retailers to take action to halt sales of egg-free vegan "Just Mayo" brand products. In this scandal, an Egg Board executive was caught discussing "putting a hit on" Hampton Creek co-founder Josh Tetrick.

Despite $4 million spent to support the retention of the checkoff, a referendum held in 2000 among hog farmers voted to eliminate the checkoff. Ann Veneman, the Secretary of Agriculture, voided the results.

The Senate in 2017 was considering changes to the enabling legislation.

=== Legal challenge ===
The constitutionality of checkoffs was challenged in federal court, and in July 2021 the United States Court of Appeals for the Ninth Circuit affirmed a 2020 grant of summary judgment dismissing the challenging suit.

"The court found that threat of decertification of the [qualified state beef councils] upon the Secretary’s disapproval of their use of funds worked to effectively control the third-party speech, thus rendering it government speech immune to First Amendment review."

== Organizations ==
- Almond Board of California
- American Egg Board
- American Lamb Board
- American Pecan Promotion Board
- Cattlemen's Beef Board, responsible for the Beef. It's What's for Dinner advertising slogan
- Cattlemen's Beef Promotion and Research Board
- Real Christmas Tree Board
- Concrete Masonry Products Board
- Cotton Board
- Fluid Milk Processors Promotion Program
- Hass Avocado Board
- National Dairy Promotion and Research Board
  - Dairy Management Inc.
- Mushroom Council
- National Honey Board
- National Mango Board
- National Peanut Board
- National Pork Board
- National Potato Promotion Board
- National Watermelon Promotion Board
- National Processed Raspberry Council
- Paper and Packaging Board
- Popcorn Board
- Propane Education and Research Council
- Softwood Lumber Board
- U.S. Highbush Blueberry Council
- United Sorghum Checkoff Program
- United Soybean Board

== See also ==
- Industry trade group
