= Beef. It's What's for Dinner =

American advertising slogan for beef consumption

"Beef. It's What's for Dinner" is an American advertising slogan and campaign aimed at promoting the consumption of beef. The ad campaign was launched in 1992 by the National Livestock and Meat Board and is funded by the Beef Checkoff Program with the creative guidance of VMLY&R.

== History ==
The campaign was launched the week of May 18, 1992 by the Chicago-based National Livestock and Meat Board through a promotional arm, "The Beef Industry Council", by the advertising firm of Leo Burnett Company. The "Beef. It's What's For Dinner" campaign was established through television and radio advertisements that featured actor Robert Mitchum as its first narrator, and scenarios and music ("Hoe-Down") from the Rodeo suite by Aaron Copland, followed by a large magazine campaign that was rolled out in late July and early August.

The initial campaign ran for 17 months at a cost of $42 million.

The new campaign replaced the slogan "Beef. Real food for real people" from the San Francisco firm of Ketchum Advertising. Leo Burnett beat out Ketchum, GSD&M Advertising, and DDB Needham. Mitchum replaced such spokespeople as James Garner who was released after quintuple bypass surgery, Cybill Shepherd, and Larry Bird, who had appeared in recent beef campaigns for The Beef Council. The previous campaigns had featured these stars in front of the camera, but the new one only used voice-over narration and highlighted the prepared beef.

The Beef Checkoff promotion is funded by collecting a dollar on every cow, steer, and bull sold in the United States. The program was challenged in the 2005 Supreme Court case Johanns v. Livestock Marketing Association. In 2017, the program is being challenged again in Ranchers-Cattlemen Action Legal Fund v. Sonny Perdue.

Twenty-two spots ran during the 1992 Summer Olympics broadcast from Barcelona, Spain. For the Lillehammer, Norway-based 1994 Winter Olympics, 34 spots were run at a cost of US$2 million.

In May 1993, Dairy Management Inc. and the Beef Industry Council created a promotion called "Double Cheese Cheeseburger Days".

After the death of Robert Mitchum on July 1, 1997, the campaign let the existing advertisements that were scheduled play out through their contract over the next few months. The campaign was already set to switch to new advertisements featuring anonymous narrators with the new campaign and slogan: "Beef. It's what you want". The new campaign was less favorable and "Beef. It's What's For Dinner." was brought back in the fall of 1999 with Sam Elliott now reading the voice-over in place of Mitchum.

The website BeefItsWhatsForDinner.com was launched in 2002 and serves as a resource for how to prepare and enjoy beef. The site addresses topics such as recipes, shopping recommendations, cooking tips, proper food handling and nutrition facts. www.BeefItsWhatsForDinner.com also includes Beef So Simple, a weekly electronic newsletter featuring beef cooking tips and recipes.

In 2021, the campaign assumed naming rights for the NASCAR Xfinity Series race at Daytona International Speedway, branding it the Beef. It's What's for Dinner. 300. The naming rights ran until 2023, and is often shortened to "Beef 300" in NASCAR media.

=== Former campaigns ===
"Powerful Beefscapes" was a recent advertising campaign from The Beef Checkoff. Building on the "Beef. It's What's for Dinner" slogan, the print and radio advertisements, voiced by actor Matthew McConaughey, asked people to "Discover the Power of Protein in the Land of Lean Beef". Launched in 2008, with the support of partner advertising agency Leo Burnett Worldwide, the new print ads demonstrate a creative approach to food photography. Each ad brings to life one of the 29 cuts of lean beef as a landscape such as flatlands, beach, cliff, mountain, canyon and river. On the radio, the new campaign continues to use the long-standing tagline and Aaron Copland's Rodeo music.

== Reception ==
According to the Beef Checkoff Program, "Beef. It's What's For Dinner" is recognized by more than 88 percent of Americans.

== Awards ==
The campaign has received awards, including the 2006 Sappi Award, and the 2003, 2004, and 2007 Effie Awards.
