= Lindenwood University =

Private university in St. Charles, Missouri, US

- Former names: The Lindenwood School for Girls (1832–1853); Lindenwood College for Women (1853–1969); Lindenwood Colleges (1969–1983); Lindenwood College (1983–1997)
- Motto: Real Experience. Real Success.
- Type: Private university
- Established: 1832; 194 years ago
- Endowment: $204 million (2021)
- President: John R. Porter
- Provost: Kathi Vosevich
- Students: 6,826 (fall 2024)
- Undergraduates: 4,663 (fall 2024)
- Postgraduates: 2,163 (fall 2024)
- Location: St. Charles, Missouri, U.S. 38.787°N 90.503°W
- Campus: 200 acres (81 ha); Urban
- Colors: Black and gold
- Nickname: Lions
- Sporting affiliations: NCAA Division I (FCS) – OVC
- Mascot: Leo the Lion
- Website: www.lindenwood.edu

Lindenwood University is a private university in St. Charles, Missouri, United States. Founded in 1832 by George Champlin Sibley and Mary Easton Sibley as The Lindenwood School for Girls, it is the second-oldest higher-education institution west of the Mississippi River. Lindenwood offers undergraduate and graduate degrees through nine colleges and schools. Its enrollment was 6,992 students in 2021. The main academic and residential campus is located 24 miles (39 km) northwest of St. Louis, Missouri, in St. Charles.

== History ==
=== Founding and early history ===
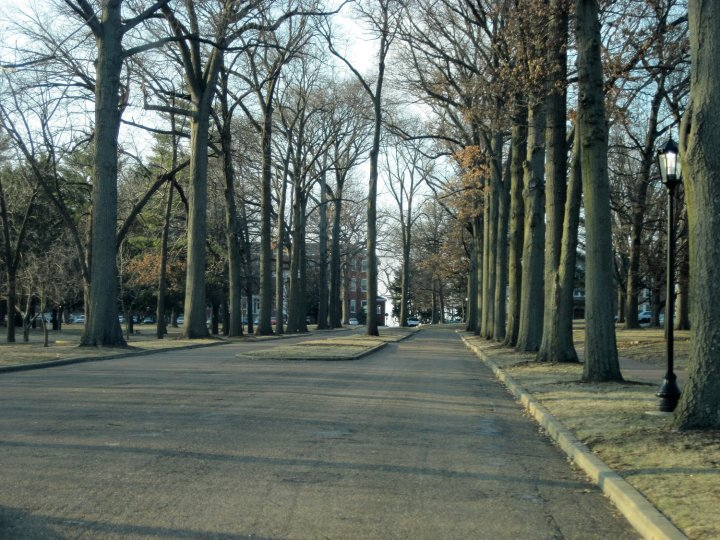
Tree-lined entrance in the historic part of the Lindenwood University campus

Lindenwood University traces its roots back to George Champlin Sibley, an early 19th-century American explorer, soldier, Indian agent, and politician, and his wife Mary Easton Sibley, an educator. In 1808, Acting Governor and friend Frederick Bates promoted Sibley to the position of chief factor at Fort Osage in western Missouri, near present-day Kansas City, Missouri. While at Fort Osage, Sibley immediately set to work creating relationships with the neighboring Osage tribes. He also met Mary Easton, the daughter of Rufus Easton, a prominent St. Louis attorney and Missouri's second Attorney General. The couple were married in 1815. During the Sibleys' time at Fort Osage, Mary began teaching the children at the fort.

In 1813, Sibley opened a temporary trading post at Fort Sibley, now known as the town of Arrow Rock, Missouri, which remained in operation until 1822. After the trading post shut down, George and Mary remained at Fort Osage, with George serving as postmaster until the fort closed in 1825. The couple then settled in St. Charles, where Mary began teaching family members and later, in 1832, other young women from the community. Lindenwood University is now considered the second-oldest higher-education institution west of the Mississippi River, after Saint Louis University, as well as the first women's college west of the Mississippi. In 1829, the Sibleys purchased 280 acres (113.3 ha) of land, known as the "Linden Wood" because of the numerous linden trees. The Sibleys borrowed money and began converting the propoerty into a farm with livestock brought from Fort Osage. They built a cabin and outhouses and moved into Linden Wood in December 1829. As the work on Linden Wood continued, the idea of opening a boarding school evolved.

Mary Sibley took in students within a year of moving into the cabin. Her 12-year-old sister, Alby, became the first student at Linden Wood in the fall of 1830. A year later, the first two paying students arrived; in early 1832, the Sibleys made plans to expand the cabin to create a boarding school for women to over a dozen students During the 1830s, the school was known as The Boarding School for Young Ladies at Linden Wood, Missouri. Mary took charge of the boarding school and developed a strict curriculum that included literature, grammar, writing, spelling, and diction. French, music and piano, landscape painting, flower painting and needle work were available for an additional fee. The school was one of the first to require physical education, which included walking and dancing.

Sibley Hall, as it appeared in 1912

By the 1840s, the boarding school had grown to 30 students. As the enrollment expanded, the Sibleys added new rooms to the cabin. The continued improvements created a financial strain on the school and Mary Sibley traveled to the East Coast to solicit additional funding. In the early 1850s, the school was on the brink of closing when the Sibleys offered the property to the Presbyterian Church. In 1853, the school was incorporated by the Missouri Legislature and became known as the Lindenwood College for Women. The newly chartered college was placed under the control of 15 directors appointed by the Presbytery of St. Louis. On July 4, 1856, the cornerstone was laid for Sibley Hall, completed in July 1857. It replaced the cabins and was home to the entire school.

George Sibley died in 1863. Following his death, the college charter was amended in 1870 to provide that the appointment of directors for the management of the college would be under the control of the Synod of Missouri instead of the Presbytery of St. Louis. A south wing was added to Sibley Hall in 1881 and a north wing in 1886. The school began expanding in the early 20th century with four new buildings constructed between 1900 and 1920.

In 1913, the school was accredited as a junior college by the North Central Association. Lindenwood received a $4 million bequest in 1918, the entire estate of the late Margaret Leggat Butler, wife of Colonel James Gay Butler, a Civil War veteran and philanthropist. The college used the funds to establish a permanent endowment and moved from a two-year to a four-year curriculum. A few years later, the college became a full member of the North Central Association.

The college became a co-educational institution in 1969 and changed its name from Lindenwood College for Women to Lindenwood Colleges, with a separate college for men and women. In 1970, the college started offering evening classes and in 1976 began awarding master's degrees. That same year, the St. Louis Football Cardinals of the NFL constructed another football field. In 1980, the college became a member of the NAIA for athletics. Lindenwood Colleges, Lindenwood College for Men and Lindenwood College for Women were merged into Lindenwood College in 1983. It was known as Lindenwood College until 1997, at which time the school changed its name to the current name of Lindenwood University.

=== Spellmann era revitalization ===
By 1989, Lindenwood College was bankrupt, with student enrollment below 800. The college was in danger of closing when the administration hired Dennis Spellmann as the new president. Spellmann immediately began to implement changes, eliminating co-ed dorms, placing the emphasis on a "values-centered" approach in the classroom, and eliminating tenure.

The university began an extensive expansion of academic, residential, and athletic facilities starting in the mid-1990s which included construction of eight new residence halls, the Spellmann Campus Center, Lou Brock Sports Complex, and Harlen C. Hunter Stadium, as well as extensions to Ayres Hall and Harmon Hall. A change that caused controversy for the school was the "Pork for Tuition" program begun in 2002 and designed to help rural families pay for tuition by the university accepting livestock in return for discounts. The animals were then processed and used in the school cafeteria. At the time, People for the Ethical Treatment of Animals staged a small protest in Saint Charles in response to the program. The Spellmann administration's focus on enrollment growth made Lindenwood the fastest-growing university in the Midwest during the time from the mid-1990s into the early 2000s. In 2006, Dennis Spellmann died by which time the university had seen its endowment grow to more than $50 million. James Evans became Lindenwood's 21st president on February 9, 2007.

=== Recent history ===
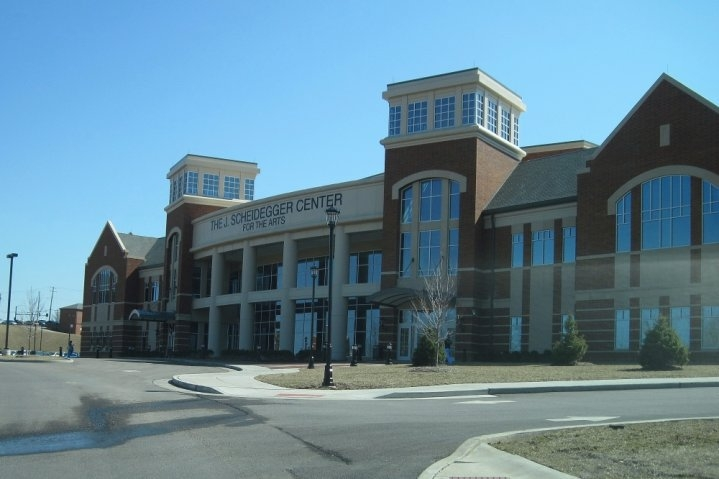
J. Scheidegger Center for the Arts

Expansion continued under Evans. The J. Scheidegger Center for the Arts, a performance and fine arts center, opened in late 2008 at a cost of $32 million. The university also constructed new dormitories and began building a new home for university presidents. Construction of Evans Commons began in 2009 and was completed during the summer of 2011. In 2011, Lindenwood University became the Lindenwood University System. Lindenwood University-Belleville transitioned from a satellite campus to a separately accredited college. The university was notified of the accrediting decision in November by the Higher Learning Commission of the North Central Association of Colleges and Schools. Under the new accreditation, Lindenwood University-Belleville will keep the same name and the same governing board as the St. Charles campus, now considered to be a sister school as part of the Lindenwood University System. By 2010, Lindenwood University's endowment had reached $148 million. The university announced a new athletic facility would be constructed behind the west end zone stands of Hunter Stadium. The three-story, 43,450-square-foot (4,037 m^{2}) building includes new football, men's and women's soccer, men's and women's lacrosse, and field hockey locker rooms. It also houses a new academic support center for student-athletes, coaches' offices, and meeting rooms overlooking the stadium. Lindenwood plans to construct a new administrative building, as well as additional dorms and campus facilities, and expand enrollment to over 20,000 students. The university and the DESCO Group announced in February 2011 that the St. Charles City Council had approved a resolution supporting the Lindenwood Town Center, a planned $30 million development that includes a shopping center, retail/business plaza, hotel, and apartment-style student housing complexes.

In the fall of 2012, the university announced it had purchased the 28-acre (11.3 ha) property that was previously home to the Barat Academy. The 69,000-square-foot (6,400 m^{2}) facility opened in 2007 and was used by the private high school until it was evicted in 2011 and relocated to a smaller property. Lindenwood purchased the facility for $8.1 million with plans to enlarge classrooms and add chemistry labs. The building became the home of the Lindenwood Nursing and Allied Health Sciences program opening in fall 2013. It is a BSN completion program for students who hold associate degrees in nursing. The university hired Peggy Ellis as the dean of the program. Ellis had served since 2005 as the associate dean of graduate studies at the St. Louis University nursing school.

In May 2014, the Lindenwood University Board of Directors approved plans for a 100,000-square-foot Library and Academic Resources Center off First Capitol Drive, adjacent to the Welcome Center on the St. Charles campus. In 2015, Lindenwood announced the construction of the new facility, which will replace the 36,000-square-foot Margaret Leggat Butler Library, built in 1929. The new Academic Resources Center building will bring together a variety of student services under one roof, including the Writing Center, Student and Academic Support Services (SASS), Career Services, English as a Second Language, the Office of International Students and Scholars, and Lindenwood Online, all of which were involved in putting together the proposal for the new structure. The building will also include classroom space and an expanded coffee shop. Completion is expected in the latter part of 2016. The university formerly owned the Daniel Boone historic site in Defiance, Missouri 26 miles (42 km) southwest of the St. Charles campus. The historic site was donated to the people of St. Charles County in April 2016.

In 2023, the university acquired Dorsey College, a for-profit trade school with seven campuses in Michigan. The school also made large cutbacks removing nine staff positions and ten sports programs including men's tennis, lacrosse, and wrestling.

== Campus ==
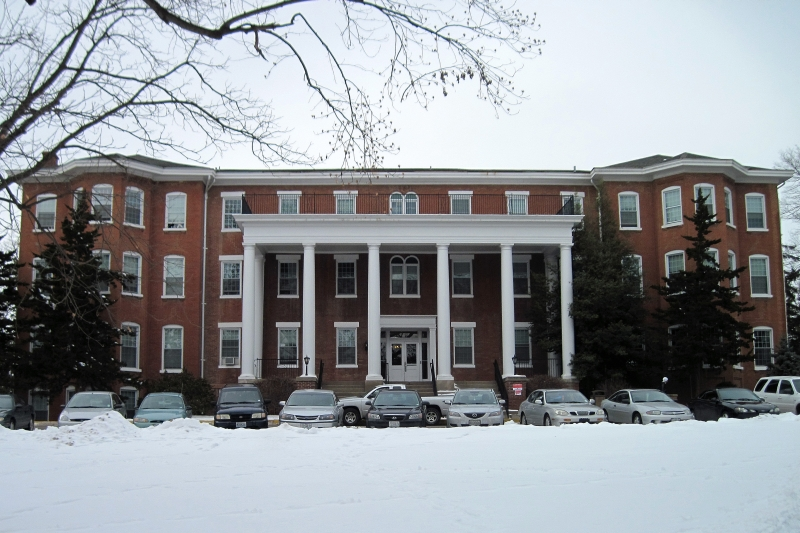
Historic Sibley Hall on the Lindenwood University campus after a fresh snowfall in 2011

The 500-acre (202.3 ha) main campus is located in historic St. Charles, Missouri, on high ground overlooking downtown St. Charles and the Missouri River. Its buildings range from historic 19th-century buildings to modern on-going construction projects. The campus stretches roughly one mile from southwest to northeast and is divided by a meandering stream. To the west, the campus is bordered by Duchesne Drive with Droste Road and West Clay Street forming the southern boundary. First Capitol Drive runs along the eastern edge of the campus and Gamble St. adjoins its north side. The eastern area of campus is the oldest section with the most recent expansion in the central and southern areas. The northwestern area has almost no structures. The university is a dry campus with alcoholic beverages prohibited on campus and in all university buildings.

The eastern part of the LU campus is the oldest part and contains many historic buildings characterized by their early 20th-century architecture and vast numbers of linden trees. This area is located near the site of the original log cabin where Mary Sibley began the Linden Wood School for Girls. The eastern part of campus is the location of many of the academic buildings and contains the Margaret Leggat Butler Library, the university's main academic library. Roemer Hall, constructed in 1921, is the main administration building on the campus and home to the president's office, financial aid office, the registrar, and the business office, as well as the School of Education.

Sibley Hall was built in 1856 and is the oldest building at Lindenwood. It was the original building for the Linden Wood School for Girls, and is still used as a women's dormitory today; it is listed on the National Register of Historic Places. Numerous mysterious incidents have occurred over the years, and legends say that Sibley Hall is haunted by the ghost of Mary Sibley.

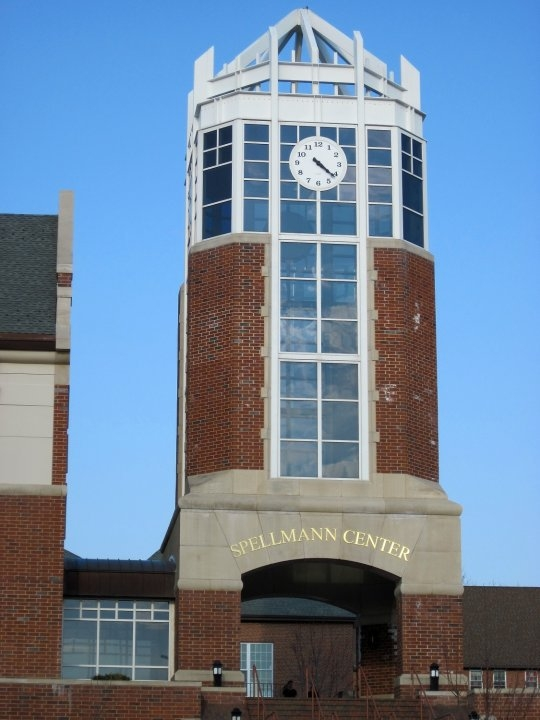
Spellmann Student Center

The central portion of the Lindenwood campus includes various residence halls and athletic facilities. At the heart of the campus sits the Spellmann Campus Center. It was built in 2002 and is located in the center of campus on the hillside near the highest part of the campus. Spellmann Center overlooks Harlen C. Hunter Stadium and much of the rest of the campus. The modern 112,000-square-foot (10,400 m^{2}) student center houses a cafeteria, a coffee shop, the Student Health Center, Student Activities Office, student media publications and student-run radio station, as well as office, classroom, and meeting spaces.

To the west of the Spellmann Center is the 7,450-seat Harlen C. Hunter Stadium, the main athletic stadium on campus. Built in 1976 by the St. Louis Cardinals NFL football team as a training camp location, the stadium opened in 1979 and was renovated in 1988, 2004, and 2009. The stadium is the home of Lindenwood Lions football, men's and women's soccer, women's field hockey, and both men's and women's lacrosse programs.

To the northwest of the stadium is the 3,270-seat Robert F. Hyland Performance Arena. This was built in 1997 and is home to both men's and women's basketball, volleyball, wrestling, table tennis, dance, and cheerleading teams. The facility also includes the athletic department offices and classroom space. Evans Commons is being constructed adjacent to the Hyland Arena. Construction for the $20 million student center began in May 2009. The 119,000-square-foot (11,100 m^{2}) facility opened in August 2011 and features a second dining hall, three basketball courts, and a roller hockey rink, a suspended jogging track, a fitness center, offices for student activities, quiet study areas, and a US post office.

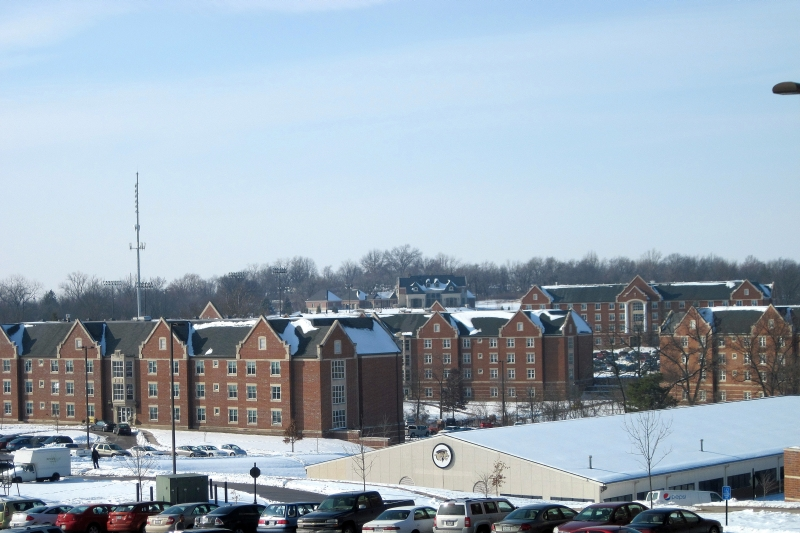
Field House, various residence halls, and president's house in the southwestern portions of the campus

The southern and western areas of campus contain much of the new construction. The J. Scheidegger Center for the Arts opened in 2008 at a cost of $32 million and lies on the southeast edge of campus. The state-of-the-art, 138,000-square-foot (12,800 m^{2}) building includes space for performance and arts education. It houses classrooms and faculty offices, as well as the 1,200-seat Bezemes Family Theatre, the Emerson Black Box Theatre, the 1,200-seat Boyle Family Gallery, the Charter LUTV HD Studio, and studio space for performing arts and communications students. The Scheidegger Center is also the home of the School of Fine and Performing Arts.

To the northwest of the Scheidegger Center is the Lou Brock Sports Complex. The Sports Complex is home to the Lindenwood Lions baseball and softball teams. The new president's house, known as Lindenwood House, opened in 2010, and is located on a hill overlooking the Sports Complex and much of the campus. The western portions of campus contain many of the new residence halls. Reynolds Hall and Pfremmer Hall were constructed in 2008 and sit between the new president's residence and LU Commons, the new student and recreation center.

=== Residence halls ===
More than 3,800 students live on campus the university's 19 residence halls segregated into male and female facilities. Each residence hall has a live-in resident director and three assistant resident directors.

=== Regional centers ===
The period of growth at Lindenwood started by Spellmann included the opening of regional centers for adult evening education programs in various locations around Greater St. Louis. In 2009, the university opened a St. Louis City Location, at 1409 Washington Avenue a rapidly growing loft district in the city. Lindenwood also operates regional centers in Daniel Boone Campus, Florissant, Moscow Mills, O'Fallon, South County, Downtown St. Louis, Westport, Weldon Spring, Wildwood, and the former Southern Air Restaurant in Wentzville.

=== Lindenwood University – Belleville ===
In 2008, Lindenwood University announced plans to expand facilities at Lindenwood University – Belleville and increased academic programs from an adult continuing education structure to offer traditional daytime semester-based programs. Starting in the fall of 2009, LU–Belleville began offering courses in business administration, communications, criminal justice, and health management. The Lindenwood University at Belleville sports teams were known the "Lynx" and competed in the National Association of Intercollegiate Athletics (NAIA) and its American Midwest Conference (AMC) until 2020. Previously, programs were only offered for junior- and senior-level students during the first semester of traditional daytime classes. These programs have now been extended to underclassman. Lindenwood expected to enroll 2,000 daytime students at the Belleville campus within the next 5 to 10 years of expanding it to a residential campus. In November 2011, Lindenwood University–Belleville completed the transition from satellite campus of Lindenwood University to a full-fledged, stand-alone college. Lindenwood University–Belleville was considered to be sister school of Lindenwood University in St. Charles, and while the two schools share a name and governing board, the Belleville campus was no longer under direct operation of the St. Charles campus.

On August 1, 2015, Brett Barger began serving as interim president of the Belleville campus. The interim title was removed and Barger was appointed president of the Lindenwood University Belleville campus in October 2015. Barger is a longtime member of the Lindenwood family, having first arrived at the St. Charles campus as a student in 1990. He was hired in 1994 and has three Lindenwood degrees – EdD, MBA, and BA. He previously served as the associate vice president for operations and finance. Barger replaced Jerry Bladdick, who left Lindenwood for a new position in Florida.

In 2019, citing "ongoing financial and enrollment challenges", the Lindenwood University Board of Trustees announced that LU–Belleville will cease to offer traditional semester-based undergraduate programs after the 2019–20 academic year. Students enrolled at the Belleville campus will be allowed to transfer to the St. Charles campus, who promised to honor all financial aid guarantees. The decision will revert the Belleville location back to an extension site for evening programs.

== Academics ==
Lindenwood University offers 121 degree programs. The university is classified as a Master's college and university. In 2007, Lindenwood began offering doctoral programs, starting with a Doctorate of Education program that prepares students for the field of educational administration.

The Lindenwood University Press produces a number of publications in the fields of international and global studies, literary magazines, American studies, and American history.

LU is accredited by the Higher Learning Commission (HLC). Lindenwood has been accredited by HLC or its predecessor since 1921. In addition, LU has accreditation from the HLC to offer full degree programs online. Since 2010 LU's School of Business and Entrepreneurship has been accredited by the Accreditation Council for Business Schools and Programs.

The university offers bachelor's degrees, master's degrees, and doctoral degrees through its colleges:

- College of Arts and Humanities
- Robert W. Plaster College of Business & Entrepreneurship
- College of Education and Human Services
- College of Science, Technology, and Health

=== Rankings ===
In the 2020 U.S. News & World Report Best College rankings, Lindenwood was ranked #293–381 among national universities. Lindenwood ranked 327 out of 395 in the National Universities category of The Washington Monthly's 2019 University Rankings.

=== Faculty and research ===
Lindenwood has a student-faculty ratio of 13:1 and an average class size of 25 students. Unlike many universities, Lindenwood does not use graduate students to teach classes. The university currently has 716 faculty, including 233 full-time faculty and 558 adjunct faculty.

Lindenwood is home to the John W. Hammond Institute for Free Enterprise, which was founded in 2013 and comprises three focus centers: the Center for Economics and the Environment, the Liberty and Ethics Center, and the Duree Center for Entrepreneurship. The Hammond Institute is under the direction of Howard J. Wall, a former vice president and economist at the Federal Reserve Bank of St. Louis, who joined Lindenwood in 2011 as director of the Institute for the Study of Economics and the Environment.

=== Speaker series and notable speakers ===
The university began the Lindenwood Speaker series in 2008 and conducts an annual speaker series throughout the fall and spring semesters in which notable figures in literature, arts, entertainment, science, business, and politics present various issues and topics to students, faculty, and the community. Past speakers include: Tamim Ansary author and Islamic expert; Dan Cathy, President and COO of Chick-fil-A restaurants; Arun Gandhi, peace activist and grandson of Mahatma Gandhi; Temple Grandin, doctor of animal science and Autism advocate; Stanley Andrisse, endocrinologist and campaigner for education for incarcerated people; former Navy SEAL, disgraced former Missouri Governor, and author, Eric Greitens; Hill Harper, actor; former MLB pitcher Jim Morris; P. J. O'Rourke, political satirist, journalist, and writer; and Reed Timmer, storm chaser and Meteorologist;

Along with the speaker series, Lindenwood has hosted various speakers and political candidates throughout its history. Robert A. Taft, United States Senator from Ohio and son of President William H. Taft spoke at Lindenwood in 1948 to discuss the Taft–Hartley Act and his candidacy for the 1948 GOP nomination. John Danforth, in 1970 during his campaign for the US Senate seat representing Missouri. Leonor K. Sullivan, visited Lindenwood in 1973 as the first woman in Congress from Missouri. John Ashcroft made a stop at Lindenwood in 1983 as a campaign stop before he became Missouri's Governor in 1984. Richard Gephardt spoke in 1985 as a U.S. Representative of Missouri. Former U.S. Senator from Missouri and Democratic vice presidential nominee, Thomas Eagleton, spoke at Lindenwood after he returned to Missouri from the senate in 1988. Henry Kissinger, former U.S. Secretary of State spoke on the campus in 1988. Jim Talent visited LU as a U.S. congressman from Missouri in 1995. Dora Boyd de Perez Balladares, First Lady of Panama visited the university in 1997. Matt Blunt came to Lindenwood while serving as the governor of Missouri. The university hosted 2012 GOP Presidential candidate, Ron Paul at the Hyland Arena on March 10, 2012.

=== Library ===
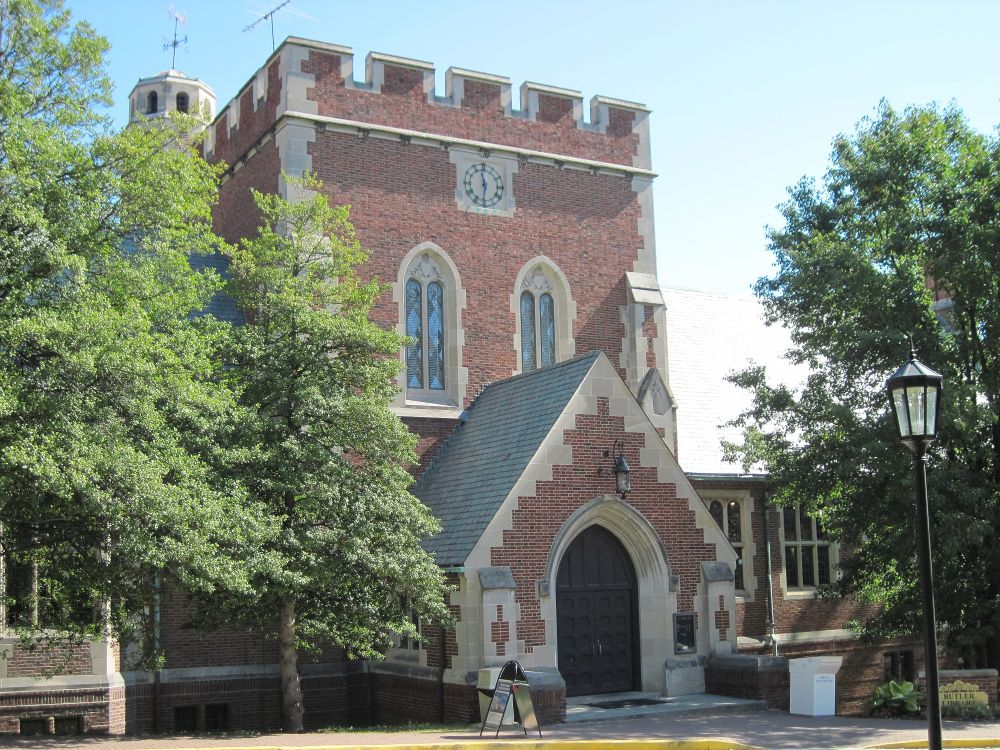
Butler Library

The Margaret Leggat Butler Library was constructed in 1929 and is located in the historic eastern region of campus. The Butler Library remained the university's library for 90 years until 2017. August 2017 marked the official opening of Lindenwood's new library building the Library and Academic Resources Center (LARC). The 100,000 square-foot and $24.5 million library features three-stories, a coffee shop, and a writing center. In addition to over 100,000 books and periodicals the Library and Academic Resource Center features 17 classrooms, study spaces, computer labs, and a media and gaming lab.

The library is a member of the MOBIUS Consortium, a statewide system that links Lindenwood's library to libraries at other higher learning institutions across Missouri.

The Library is home to the Mary Ambler Archives. The archives were founded in 1993 and are part of the Missouri Digital Heritage Initiative and the State Historical Society of Missouri. They include a collection of historical documents, official records, and special collections from the 185-year history of the university. The archives also include historical documents from Missouri during the early American Frontier and Antebellum periods. Other historical materials include information on women's colleges, the personal papers of George and Mary Sibley, and historical documents from St. Charles County, St. Louis City and St. Louis County together with the surrounding area.

=== Honor societies and Honors College ===
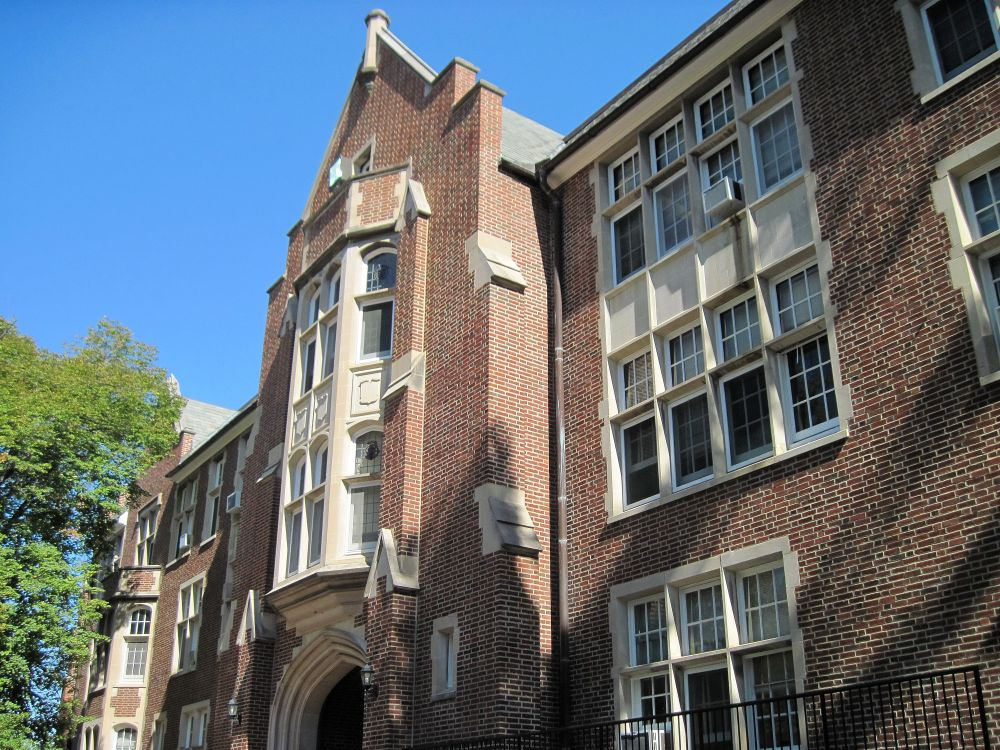
Roemer Hall

Lindenwood University participates in the following national and international honor societies. Alpha Chi is a general scholarship honor society for students who are in the top 10% of their classes. Alpha Lambda Delta is a general scholarship honor society for students who have achieved a 3.5 GPA or higher and are in the top 20% of their class during their first year or term of higher education. Alpha Sigma Lambda, a general scholarship honor society for nontraditional undergraduate students who achieve and maintain outstanding scholastic standards and leadership characteristics. Lindenwood also has a number of other subject-specific honor societies including the honor society for the National Broadcasting Society and electronic media students Alpha Epsilon Rho, the international education honor society Kappa Delta Pi, the national history honor society Phi Alpha Theta, the national French honor society Pi Delta Phi (Zeta Pi), the international honor society for social sciences Pi Gamma Mu, the national mathematics honor society Pi Mu Epsilon, the national political science honor society Pi Sigma Alpha, the international honor society in psychology Psi Chi, and national Spanish-language honor society Sigma Delta Pi.

The Lindenwood University Honors College offers students an opportunity to be recognized for academic excellence at graduation and on official transcripts and diplomas. Eligible students must have a score of 29 or above on the ACT to apply as an incoming freshman and maintain at least a 3.3 GPA for upperclass and transfer students. Students must complete 24 hours of Honors credits to graduate with University Honors.

== Athletics ==
Lindenwood Lions Athletics wordmark

The Lindenwood athletic teams are called the Lions and Lady Lions. The university is a member of the NCAA Division I ranks, primarily competing in the Ohio Valley Conference (OVC) for most of its sports since the 2022–23 academic year. Lindenwood has yet to announce a future conference affiliation for any of these sports, none of which the OVC sponsors. Even before Lindenwood's OVC move, it sponsored four de facto NCAA Division I sports. (Note: The NCAA women's ice hockey and men's volleyball championships are open to members of Divisions I and II. The NCAA women's gymnastics championship is open to members of all three NCAA divisions.) Women's ice hockey competes in College Hockey America (CHA), women's gymnastics competes as a member of the Midwest Independent Conference (MIC), men's volleyball competes in the Midwestern Intercollegiate Volleyball Association (MIVA), and women's wrestling, recognized by the NCAA as part of its Emerging Sports for Women program but without an official NCAA championship event, competes as an independent. Lindenwood also sponsors other sports that compete in various other sport organizations for non-NCAA sports.

Before joining NCAA Division I, the Lions competed in the Great Lakes Valley Conference (GLVC) of the NCAA Division II ranks from 2019–20 to 2021–22; while women's lacrosse competed in the Rocky Mountain Athletic Conference (RMAC), its men's and women's swimming teams competed in the New South Intercollegiate Swim Conference, and its field hockey team competed as a member of the ECAC Division II; and in the D-II Mid-America Intercollegiate Athletics Association (MIAA) from 2013–14 to 2018–19.

Prior joining to NCAA Division II, Lindenwood was previously a member of the National Association of Intercollegiate Athletics (NAIA) and competed within the Heart of America Conference (HAAC) as its primary conference from 1996–97 to 2010–11, in addition to other athletic organizations for sports not sponsored by the HAAC, as well as in the American Midwest Conference from 1993–94 to 1995–96. During the university's time in the NAIA it had a total of 46 varsity sports teams making LU one of the largest athletic departments in the United States. Lindenwood University competed in NAIA athletics for nearly 40 years before beginning the transition process for NCAA D-II membership. On July 12, 2010, Lindenwood was accepted into NCAA Division II and was approved as a member of the MIAA on September 24, 2010, with the affiliation taking place in 2012–2013 academic year. LU plans included the 21 sports that then competed in the NAIA to move to NCAA Division II along with non-NAIA sports field hockey, men's lacrosse, and women's lacrosse. Women's ice hockey and men's volleyball would compete in NCAA Division I, and all other sports would remain in their non-NCAA and non-NAIA sport organizations. Lindenwood officially concluded its NAIA and HAAC membership at the conclusion of the 2010–11 academic year. During the university's 15 seasons as a member of the HAAC the Lions set a conference record, winning 128 HAAC titles. Lindenwood averaged 8.5 conference titles a year and won at least one conference championship in sport sponsored by the conference.

In 2018, the Lindenwood women's bowling team won the national USBC Intercolligiate Team Championships held in Lincoln, Nebraska, defeating defending champion McKendree University in the final round.

Lindenwood has won national championships in skeet, trap, and clay shooting.

Lindenwood Athletics has been honoring previous student-athletes or contributors of the athletic department since 2007 with the Lindenwood Sports Hall of Fame.

In 2023, the university discontinued 10 athletic teams.

== Student life ==
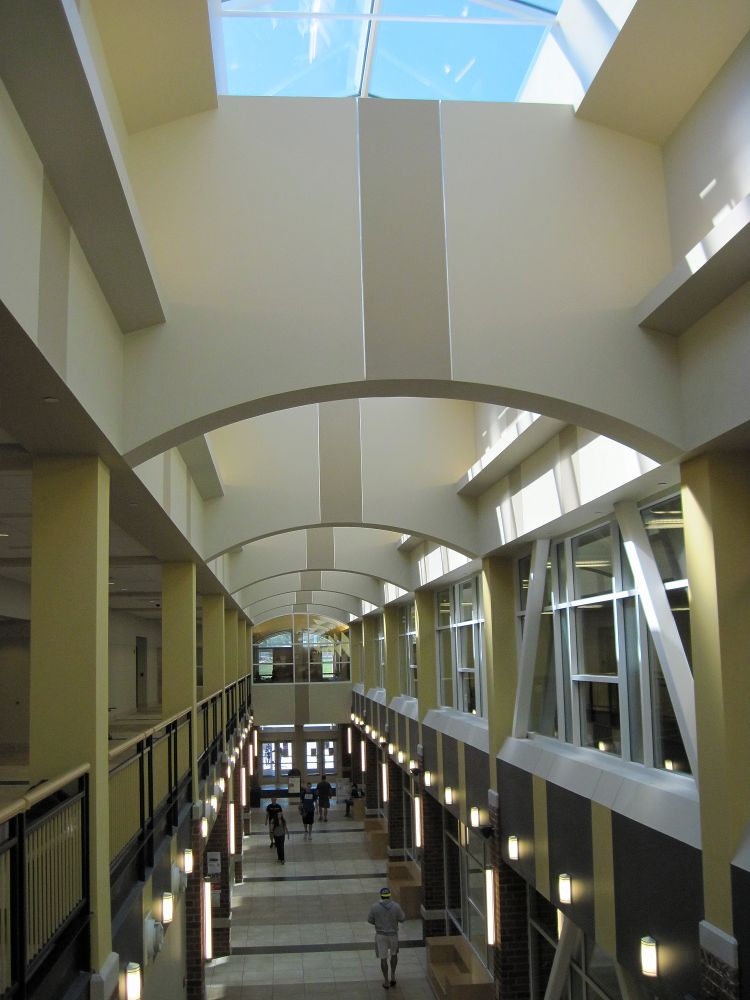
Main promenade inside the Evans Commons student and rec center

Lindenwood's student body comes from various locations across the United States, Canada, and other worldwide locations. Approximately 64% of student body is from Missouri, with the majority of in-state students from St. Charles and St. Louis counties. Out-of-state students represent 22% of undergraduate enrollment and are made up of students from 45 of the 50 US states. In addition, 13% of students are from 60 foreign countries.

The university has over 70 clubs and student organizations under the direction of Student Involvement. CAB (Campus Activities Board) hosts lectures, movie nights, dances, performances, and a wide variety of other events. Lindenwood also offers over 20 Intramural sports. The student organizations at Lindenwood include the student government, various academic, service, religious, Greek, and common interest organizations, and service organizations. Lindenwood Student Government Association (LSGA) is the main governing arm of the student body. The student government is the voice for student concerns in cooperation the university. The LSGA, as well as all organizations, sponsor various academic, social, spiritual, and physical events on campus to add to well-being of the student body. The Golden Lion Marching Band is the university's marching band. A subset, the LU Pep Band plays at various special events and athletic events on campus throughout the school year. The Gateway Battalion is the local chapter of the Army ROTC based out Washington University in St. Louis. ROTC provides officer training and education for LU students in conjunction with WashU and a number of other universities that make up the Battalion. Officially founded in 1919 and with roots tracing to the 1890s, it is one of the oldest such programs in the nation. After completing the Army ROTC program, LU students receive a commission in either the Regular Army, Army Reserve, or National Guard. LU Crew is a group of students that meet to promote school spirit at home athletic events and other special events. LU Crew can be seen at sporting events with signs, starting cheers, and various other activities in the student sections and stands.

Sibley Day has been held since 2009 and is a new tradition at Lindenwood. The event includes special events and activities for students and faculty, guest speakers, presentations, and other social and educational activities. Past guest speakers has included: Arun Gandhi.

=== Greek life ===
The modern era of the Greek system at Lindenwood began in 1992, when the college announced that two sororities and three fraternities would be established on campus. Today, there are numerous fraternities and sororities on campus. There is, however, no Greek housing on campus. Each social fraternity/sorority currently has dormitory rooms reserved for brothers or sisters who wish to live together.

=== Student media and publications ===
Lindenwood University has a number of student media outlets that serve the campus and surrounding communities of St. Charles County. The official student magazine, The Legacy, is published once a month.

The university hosts a student-operated educational cable station, LUTV. It is available on Charter Cable and on AT&T U-Verse throughout Greater St. Louis, as well as streaming live online. LUTV runs educational, cultural, and LU athletic programming, and serves as a learning experience for communications students.

89.1 The Wood is KCLC, an FCC-licensed college radio station broadcasting in the St. Louis metro area.

== Notable alumni ==
- Greg Amsinger, sportcaster
- Alice Baber, painter
- Wesley Bell, politician
- Lee Daniels, actor, film producer, and director
- Pierre Desir, professional football player
- Thom Donovan, musician and songwriter
- DeDe Dorsey, professional football player
- Marjorie Finlay, television personality and grandmother of Taylor Swift
- Shandi Finnessey, beauty pageant contestant
- Nicole Hensley, professional hockey player
- Esmeralda Johnson, politician
- Priyadharshan Kannappan, chess player
- Andrew Koenig, politician
- Dan McLaughlin, sportscaster
- Nell Donnelly Reed, fashion designer
- John Salter, professional mixed martial artist
- Brian Schaefering, professional football player
- Gary W. Schenkel, civil servant
- Kyle Sherman, professional bowler and TV commentator
- Daniel Walcott, professional hockey player
- Alexander Wright, professional football player
