= Glen Campbell Goodbye Tour =

2011–12 concert tour by Glen Campbell

Glen Campbell: The Goodbye Tour
- Tour by Glen Campbell
- Location: Europe; North America
- Associated album: Ghost on the Canvas
- Start date: August 31, 2011
- End date: November 30, 2012
- Legs: 3
- No. of shows: 148

Glen Campbell: The Goodbye Tour was the final concert tour by Glen Campbell, showcasing his album, Ghost on the Canvas. The tour started on August 31, 2011 in Toronto and concluded on November 30, 2012 in Napa.

== Background ==
Campbell was supported on tour by roots band Instant People, which includes all three of his children with current wife Kim, sons Cal on drums and Shannon on guitar, and daughter Ashley on banjo and keyboards as well as daughter Debby from a previous marriage. His eldest daughter Debby sang harmony. Prior to the tour, they played a show in Biloxi, Mississippi previewing the line-up. On September 15, 2011, Debby announced her departure from the band.

== Set list ==
This set list is representative of the performance on June 24, 2012 in Los Angeles, California. It does not represent the set list at all concerts for the duration of the tour.

1. "Gentle on My Mind"
2. "Galveston"
3. "By the Time I Get to Phoenix"
4. "Try a Little Kindness"
5. "Where's the Playground Susie"
6. "Didn't We"
7. "I Can't Stop Loving You"
8. "True Grit"
9. "Lovesick Blues"
10. "Dueling Banjos"
11. "Digging Deep"
12. "Hey Little One"
13. "Any Trouble"
14. "It's Your Amazing Grace"
15. "The Moon Is a Harsh Mistress"
16. "Wichita Lineman"
17. "Rhinestone Cowboy"

Encore

18. "Southern Nights"
19. "A Better Place"

== Tour dates ==
Date	City	Country	Venue	Attendance	Box office
North America
August 31, 2011	Toronto	Canada	CNE Bandshell	—N/a	—N/a
September 2, 2011	Moncton	Canada	Casino New Brunswick	—N/a	—N/a
September 9, 2011	St. Charles	United States	J. Scheidegger Center for the Arts	—N/a	—N/a
September 10, 2011 (Note: The September 10, 2011 concert in Forrest City was part of the EACC Spotlight Series.)	Forrest City	United States	EACC Fine Arts Center	—N/a	—N/a
September 15, 2011	Philadelphia	United States	Irvine Auditorium	—N/a	—N/a
September 17, 2011	Renfro Valley	United States	Renfro Valley Entertainment Center	—N/a	—N/a
September 21, 2011	Stafford	United States	Stafford Centre	—N/a	—N/a
September 23, 2011	Marksville	United States	Paragon Casino Resort	—N/a	—N/a
September 25, 2011	Coarsegold	United States	Chukchansi Gold Resort and Casino	—N/a	—N/a
October 1, 2011	Reno	United States	Eldorado Showroom	—N/a	—N/a
October 6, 2011	Los Angeles	United States	Club Nokia	1,500 / 1,500	$63,630
October 9, 2011 (Note: The October 9, 2011 concert in Santa Barbara was part of the Santa Barbara Birth Center Benefit.)	Santa Barbara	United States	Lobero Theatre	—N/a	—N/a
October 13, 2011	Sault Ste. Marie	United States	Dreammakers Theater	—N/a	—N/a
October 15, 2011	Carlton	United States	Black Bear Casino	—N/a	—N/a
Europe
October 21, 2011	Salford	England	The Lowry Lyric Theatre	—N/a	—N/a
October 22, 2011	London	England	Royal Festival Hall	—N/a	—N/a
October 23, 2011	Cardiff	Wales	St David's Hall	—N/a	—N/a
October 24, 2011	Northampton	England	Derngate Theatre	—N/a	—N/a
October 25, 2011	Liverpool	England	Philharmonic Hall	—N/a	—N/a
October 26, 2011	Nottingham	England	Nottingham Royal Concert Hall	—N/a	—N/a
October 28, 2011	York	England	York Barbican	—N/a	—N/a
October 29, 2011	Newcastle	England	Newcastle City Hall	—N/a	—N/a
October 30, 2011	Basingstoke	England	The Anvil	—N/a	—N/a
November 1, 2011	Plymouth	England	Plymouth Pavilions	—N/a	—N/a
November 2, 2011	Bristol	England	Colston Hall	—N/a	—N/a
November 3, 2011	Brighton	England	Brighton Dome	—N/a	—N/a
November 4, 2011	Guilford	England	G Live	—N/a	—N/a
November 5, 2011	Southend	England	Cliffs Pavilion	—N/a	—N/a
November 6, 2011	Birmingham	England	Symphony Hall	—N/a	—N/a
November 12, 2011	Killarney	Ireland	Ireland's National Events Centre	—N/a	—N/a
November 13, 2011	Castlebar	Ireland	The Royal Theatre	—N/a	—N/a
November 19, 2011 (Note: The November 19, 2011 concert in Dublin was originally scheduled to take place on November 11, 2011.)	Dublin	Ireland	Convention Centre Auditorium	—N/a	—N/a
November 20, 2011 (Note: The November 20, 2011 concert in Edinburgh was originally scheduled to take place on November 8, 2011.)	Edinburgh	Scotland	Edinburgh Festival Theatre	—N/a	—N/a
November 22, 2011 (Note: The November 22, 2011 concert in Aberdeen was originally scheduled to take place on November 9, 2011.)	Aberdeen	Scotland	Music Hall	—N/a	—N/a
November 23, 2011	Aberdeen	Scotland	Music Hall	—N/a	—N/a
November 24, 2011	Glasgow	Scotland	Glasgow Royal Concert Hall	—N/a	—N/a
North America
November 30, 2011	Nashville	United States	Ryman Auditorium	—N/a	—N/a
December 2, 2011	Branson	United States	Tri-Lakes Center	—N/a	—N/a
December 3, 2011	Branson	United States	Tri-Lakes Center	—N/a	—N/a
December 5, 2011	Nashville	United States	Ryman Auditorium	—N/a	—N/a
December 16, 2011	French Lick	United States	French Lick Resort Casino	—N/a	—N/a
December 18, 2011	Mescalero	United States	Inn of the Mountain Gods Resort and Casino	—N/a	—N/a
January 3, 2012	Nashville	United States	Ryman Auditorium	—N/a	—N/a
January 5, 2012	Huntington	United States	Keith-Albee Theatre	—N/a	—N/a
January 7, 2012	New York City	United States	The Town Hall	—N/a	—N/a
January 11, 2012	Worcester	United States	Hanover Theatre	—N/a	—N/a
January 13, 2012	Houston	United States	Arena Theatre	—N/a	—N/a
January 14, 2012	Bossier City	United States	Diamond Jacks Casino	—N/a	—N/a
January 19, 2012	Bloomington	United States	Bloomington Center for the Performing Arts	—N/a	—N/a
January 20, 2012	Freeport	United States	Masonic Event Center	—N/a	—N/a
January 21, 2012	Milwaukee	United States	Pabst Theater	—N/a	—N/a
January 22, 2012 (Note: The January 22, 2012 concert in Wausau was originally scheduled to take place on December 8, 2011.)	Wausau	United States	Grand Theater	—N/a	—N/a
January 26, 2012	Joliet	United States	Rialto Square Theatre	—N/a	—N/a
January 28, 2012 (Note: The January 28, 2012 concert in Ann Arbor was part of the Ann Arbor Folk Festival.)	Ann Arbor	United States	Hill Auditorium	—N/a	—N/a
January 29, 2012	Kent	United States	Kent Stage	—N/a	—N/a
February 6, 2012	Los Angeles	United States	The Clive Davis Theater	—N/a	—N/a
February 11, 2012 (Note: The February 11 and March 24, 2012 concerts in Silver Springs were part of the Silver Springs concert series.)	Silver Springs	United States	Twin Oaks Amphitheatre	—N/a	—N/a
February 15, 2012	Tucson	United States	Fox Tucson Theatre	—N/a	—N/a
February 17, 2012	Pala	United States	Infinity Room	—N/a	—N/a
February 18, 2012	Phoenix	United States	Comerica Theatre	—N/a	—N/a
February 23, 2012	Boston	United States	Wilbur Theatre	—N/a	—N/a
February 24, 2012	Uncasville	United States	Mohegan Sun Arena	1,990 / 3,258	$59,700
February 26, 2012	Jackson	United States	Thalia Mara Hall	—N/a	—N/a
March 2, 2012	Shelton	United States	Little Creek Casino Resort	—N/a	—N/a
March 3, 2012	Spokane	United States	Northern Quest Resort & Casino	—N/a	—N/a
March 4, 2012	Lewiston	United States	Clearwater River Casino	—N/a	—N/a
March 16, 2012	Midland	United States	Wagner Noël Performing Arts Center	1,758 / 1,758	$106,935
March 16, 2012	Austin	United States	Travis County Exposition Center	—N/a	—N/a
March 21, 2012	Clearwater	United States	Capitol Theatre	—N/a	—N/a
March 22, 2012	Clearwater	United States	Capitol Theatre	—N/a	—N/a
March 23, 2012	Melbourne	United States	King Center for the Performing Arts	—N/a	—N/a
March 24, 2012	Silver Springs	United States	Twin Oaks Amphitheatre	—N/a	—N/a
March 25, 2012	Jacksonville	United States	Florida Theatre	1,101 / 1,101	$46,253
March 27, 2012	Tulsa	United States	Osage Million Dollar Elm Casino	—N/a	—N/a
April 13, 2012	Prior Lake	United States	Mystic Showroom	—N/a	—N/a
April 14, 2012	Spencer	United States	Clay County Regional Events Center	—N/a	—N/a
April 15, 2012	Ames	United States	Stephens Auditorium	1,564 / 2,291	$77,700
April 18, 2012	Alexandria	United States	The Birchmere	—N/a	—N/a
April 19, 2012	Jim Thorpe	United States	Penn's Peak	—N/a	—N/a
April 20, 2012	Verona	United States	The Showroom Turning Stone	—N/a	—N/a
April 21, 2012	Peekskill	United States	Paramount Hudson Valley Theater	—N/a	—N/a
April 26, 2012	Kansas City	United States	Uptown Theater	—N/a	—N/a
April 27, 2012	Fayetteville	United States	Baum Walker Hall	—N/a	—N/a
April 28, 2012	Fayetteville	United States	Baum Walker Hall	—N/a	—N/a
April 29, 2012	Wichita	United States	Orpheum Theatre	—N/a	—N/a
May 9, 2012	Warren	United States	Andiamo Celebrity Showroom	—N/a	—N/a
May 10, 2012	Wabash	United States	Ford Theater	—N/a	—N/a
May 11, 2012	Warren	United States	Andiamo Celebrity Showroom	—N/a	—N/a
May 12, 2012	Manistee	United States	Little River Casino Resort	—N/a	—N/a
May 18, 2012	Paducah	United States	The Carson Center	—N/a	—N/a
May 20, 2012	Pittsburgh	United States	Byham Theater	—N/a	—N/a
May 21, 2012	Lancaster	United States	American Music Theatre	—N/a	—N/a
May 22, 2012	Englewood	United States	Bergen Performing Arts Center	—N/a	—N/a
May 24, 2012	Albany	United States	Kitty Carlisle Hart Theatre	—N/a	—N/a
May 25, 2012	Peekskill	United States	Paramount Hudson Valley Theater	—N/a	—N/a
May 26, 2012	Red Bank	United States	Count Basie Theatre	—N/a	—N/a
June 1, 2012	Winchester	United States	Hilton International Theater	—N/a	—N/a
June 2, 2012	Winchester	United States	Hilton International Theater	—N/a	—N/a
June 6, 2012	Atlanta	United States	John A. Williams Theatre	—N/a	—N/a
June 7, 2012 (Note: The June 7, 2012 concert in Nashville was part of the CMA Music Festival.)	Nashville	United States	LP Field	—N/a	—N/a
June 8, 2012	Louisville	United States	Palace Theatre	—N/a	—N/a
June 9, 2012	Evansville	United States	Aiken Theatre	—N/a	—N/a
June 10, 2012	Indianapolis	United States	Murat Theatre	—N/a	—N/a
June 20, 2012	Saratoga	United States	Mountain Winery	—N/a	—N/a
June 21, 2012	Stockton	United States	Bob Hope Theater	—N/a	—N/a
June 22, 2012	Santa Rosa	United States	Ruth Finley Person Theater	—N/a	—N/a
June 24, 2012	Los Angeles	United States	Hollywood Bowl	—N/a	—N/a
June 26, 2012	Sandy	United States	Sandy Amphitheater	—N/a	—N/a
June 28, 2012 (Note: The June 28, 2012 concert in Highland Park was part of the Ravinia Festival.)	Highland Park	United States	Ravinia Pavilion	—N/a	—N/a
June 29, 2012	Green Bay	United States	Meyer Theatre	—N/a	—N/a
June 30, 2012	Bayfield	United States	Big Top Chautauqua	—N/a	—N/a
July 7, 2012	San Antonio	United States	Majestic Theatre	—N/a	—N/a
July 8, 2012	Galveston	United States	Grand 1894 Opera House	—N/a	—N/a
July 13, 2012	Hiawassee	United States	Anderson Music Hall	—N/a	—N/a
July 14, 2012 (Note: The June 28, 2012 concert in Atlanta was part co-headlined by Kenny Rogers.)	Atlanta	United States	Delta Classic Chastain Park Amphitheater	—N/a	—N/a
July 15, 2012	Panama City	United States	Marina Civic Center	—N/a	—N/a
July 21, 2012	Cary	United States	Koka Booth Amphitheatre	—N/a	—N/a
July 22, 2012	Alexandria	United States	The Birchmere	—N/a	—N/a
July 23, 2012	Alexandria	United States	The Birchmere	—N/a	—N/a
July 25, 2012 (Note: The July 25, 2012 concert in Goshen was part of the Elkhart County 4-H Fair.)	Goshen	United States	Elkhart County Fairgrounds	—N/a	—N/a
July 27, 2012 (Note: The July 25, 2012 concert in Goshen was part of the Ozark Empire Fair.)	Springfield	United States	Ozark Empire Fairgrounds	—N/a	—N/a
July 29, 2012	Albuquerque	United States	Route 66 Casino Hotel	—N/a	—N/a
September 2, 2012	Honolulu	United States	Neal S. Blaisdell Concert Hall	—N/a	—N/a
September 6, 2012	Little Rock	United States	Robinson Center	—N/a	—N/a
September 7, 2012	Jonesboro	United States	Arkansas State University	—N/a	—N/a
September 9, 2012	Austin	United States	Michael & Susan Dell Hall	—N/a	—N/a
October 12, 2012	Sewell	United States	TD Bank Arts Center	—N/a	—N/a
October 13, 2012	New York City	United States	Carnegie Hall	—N/a	—N/a
October 16, 2012	Portland	United States	Merrill Auditorium	—N/a	—N/a
October 17, 2012	Boston	United States	Wilbur Theatre	—N/a	—N/a
October 18, 2012	New Brunswick	United States	State Theatre	—N/a	—N/a
October 19, 2012	Morristown	United States	Mayo Performing Arts Center	—N/a	—N/a
October 20, 2012	Torrington	United States	Warner Theatre	—N/a	—N/a
October 24, 2012	Buffalo	United States	Center for the Arts	—N/a	—N/a
October 25, 2012	Ithaca	United States	State Theater	—N/a	—N/a
October 26, 2012	Bethlehem	United States	Sands Bethlehem Event Center	—N/a	—N/a
October 27, 2012	Shippensburg	United States	Luhrs Performing Arts Center	—N/a	—N/a
November 2, 2012	Fort Pierce	United States	Sunrise Theatre	—N/a	—N/a
November 4, 2012	Sarasota	United States	Van Wezel Performing Arts Hall	—N/a	—N/a
November 10, 2012	Kent	United States	Kent Stage	—N/a	—N/a
November 11, 2012	Cincinnati	United States	Taft Theatre	—N/a	—N/a
November 13, 2012	Lexington	United States	Lexington Opera House	—N/a	—N/a
November 15, 2012	Miami	United States	Buffalo Run Casino & Resort	—N/a	—N/a
November 17, 2012	Texarkana	United States	Perot Theatre	—N/a	—N/a
November 27, 2012	Seattle	United States	Paramount Theatre	—N/a	—N/a
November 28, 2012	Portland	United States	Arlene Schnitzer Concert Hall	—N/a	—N/a
November 30, 2012	Napa	United States	Uptown Theater	—N/a	—N/a

=== Cancelled concerts ===
Date	City	Country	Venue
April 17, 2012	Alexandria	United States	The Birchmere
August 10, 2012	Christchurch	New Zealand	CBS Canterbury Arena
August 12, 2012	Auckland	New Zealand	Vector Arena
August 15, 2012	Sydney	Australia	State Theatre
August 16, 2012	Sydney	Australia	State Theatre
August 19, 2012 (Note: The August 19, 2012 concert in Brisbane was originally scheduled to take place on August 17, 2012.)	Brisbane	Australia	Queensland Performing Arts Centre
August 21, 2012	Perth	Australia	Crown Theatre
August 23, 2012	Melbourne	Australia	Palais Theatre
August 24, 2012	Newcastle	Australia	Newcastle Entertainment Centre
