= Howard Wall =

Howard Wall may refer to:

- Howard Wall (baseball) (1854–1909), American Major League Baseball shortstop
- Howard J. Wall, American economist
