= Ghost on the Canvas =

Studio album by Glen Campbell
- Released: 30 August 2011
- Recorded: 2009–2010, with string arrangement recorded in Los Angeles in April 2010
- Genre: Country, pop, rock
- Length: 42:02
- Language: English
- Label: Surfdog
- Producer: Julian Raymond; Howard Willing

Glen Campbell chronology
| Meet Glen Campbell (2008) | Ghost on the Canvas (2011) | Glen Campbell and Jimmy Webb: In Session (2012) |

Ghost on the Canvas is the sixty-first album by Glen Campbell. It was intended as Campbell's farewell studio recording following his diagnosis with Alzheimer's disease. The production of the album was announced in March 2010.

Campbell and his wife delayed informing the public about his illness until shortly before he embarked on the Glen Campbell Goodbye Tour. The Campbells decided to announce his diagnosis so that audiences would understand why the performer might mistake the lyrics to songs or behave erratically. They also wished to combat the social stigma of Alzheimer's, for the benefit of others suffering from the disease.

== Recording ==
Campbell first became aware of his affliction with Alzheimer's while recording the music in 2009, although his wife Kim had noted memory lapses several years prior. Campbell and producer Julian Raymond decided to record one final studio album of original material while he was in good enough health, with Raymond taking the lead to contact other artists for collaboration.

The collaborative album is intended as a companion piece to 2008's Meet Glen Campbell—on that recording, Campbell recorded covers of contemporary songs to introduce himself to a new audience and this album includes younger rock stars to compose and record with Campbell. Campbell worked with Raymond for those sessions and Raymond used a notebook to record Campbell's conversations between takes, so the two could collaborate on writing new material based on stories from Campbell's life, starting with the autobiographical "A Better Place". The title track—written by Paul Westerberg—previously appeared on Westerberg's 2009 extended play PW & The Ghost Gloves Cat Wing Joy Boys. "Hold On Hope" is a cover of a song by the indie rock band Guided by Voices that had originally appeared on their 1999 album Do the Collapse.

At the time of the album's release, Campbell expressed interest in possibly recording further material, but thought it unlikely that he would record an entire studio album. He did, however, return to the studio long enough to produce two final albums: 2012's See You There which re-records many of his hits and was largely put to tape at the same time as Ghost on the Canvas and 2017's covers album Adiós, recorded in 2013.

== Reception ==
Professional ratings
Review scores
| Source | Rating |
|---|---|
| BBC Music | Favorable |
| The Plain Dealer | A |
| Consequence of Sound | 3.5/5 stars |
| Financial Times | 4/5 stars |
| The Independent | 3/5 stars |
| Pitchfork Media | 6.5/10 |
| The Daily Telegraph | 4/5 stars |
| The Washington Post | Mixed |

BBC Music reviewer Martin Aston has called Ghost on the Canvas "a fine way to bow out of the business", citing Rick Rubin's production work with Johnny Cash through American Recordings. Aston continued that Campbell's vocal performance remains strong and the instrumental interludes were reminiscent of The Beach Boys' Pet Sounds. Consequence of Sound's Nick Freed also compared this album to Cash's final output, noting that Ghost on the Canvas and Cash's American Recordings material shift from straight country music to different pop genres. Both Freed and Andy Gill of The Independent commented on the themes of mortality and finality in the lyrics.

The Washington Post's Allison Stewart found the collaborative nature of the album a weakness, turning melancholy into overwrought sentiment. Christopher Muther of The Boston Globe considers the album "gorgeous and charming", but finds the sentimentality "overshadows Campbell's emotional and musical growth." Mick Brown of The Daily Telegraph has noted the hopeful tone of the lyrics, influenced by Campbell's deteriorating health.

Mojo placed the album at number 44 on its list of the "Top 50 Albums of 2011".

== Track listing ==
All songs co-written by Glen Campbell and Julian Raymond, except where noted

1. "A Better Place" – 1:51
2. "Ghost on the Canvas" (Paul Westerberg) – 4:13
3. "The Billstown Crossroads" (Roger Joseph Manning, Jr.) – 1:04
4. "A Thousand Lifetimes" (Campbell, Justin Grey, and Raymond) – 4:09
5. "It's Your Amazing Grace" – 3:14
6. "Second Street North" (Manning) – 0:35
7. "In My Arms" (Teddy Thompson) – 3:27
8. "May 21, 1969" (Manning) – 0:34
9. "Nothing But the Whole Wide World" (Jakob Dylan) – 3:41
10. "Wild and Waste" (Manning) – 1:13
11. "Hold on Hope" (Robert Pollard) – 3:33
12. "Valley of the Son" (Manning) – 0:57
13. "Any Trouble" (Westerberg) – 3:00
14. "Strong" – 3:33
15. "The Rest Is Silence" (Manning) – 0:50
16. "There's No Me... Without You" – 6:16

Amazon MP3 and iTunes Store bonus tracks

17. "What I Wouldn't Give" – 2:38
18. "Wish You Were Here" (Jimmy Webb) – 3:51 (song re-titled for this album, originally entitled "Postcard from Paris")

The deluxe edition of the album also includes five bonus tracks recorded on The Glen Campbell Goodtime Hour
Note: Bonus tracks no longer included with Amazon MP3 purchase (December 5, 2015).

== Tour ==
Campbell promoted this album with his final concert tour.

== Personnel ==
- Glen Campbell – acoustic and electric guitar, vocals

Additional musicians and composers

- Kim Bullard – keyboards
- Shannon Campbell – vocals
- Chris Chaney – bass guitar
- Vinnie Colaiuta – drums
- Katie Cole – vocals
- Billy Corgan – electric guitar on "There's No Me... Without You"
- Dick Dale – electric guitar on "In My Arms"
- George Doering – acoustic guitar, banjo, mandolin
- Eric Dover – vocals
- Jakob Dylan – composition
- Jason Falkner – acoustic and electric guitar, bass guitar
- Josh Freese – drums
- Jessy Greene - violin
- Justin Grey – composition
- Peter Holmström – electric guitar on "Strong"
- Steve Hunter – electric guitar on “There's No Me... Without You"
- Chris Isaak – vocals on "In My Arms"
- Corky James – acoustic guitar
- Danny Levin – trumpet
- Roger Joseph Manning, Jr. – keyboards, vocals
- Wendy Melvoin – electric guitar
- Rick Nielsen – electric guitar on "There's No Me... Without You"
- Tim Pierce – acoustic and electric guitar, mandolin
- Robert Pollard – composition
- Zac Rac – keyboards
- Julian Raymond – vocals, arrangement, production, co-writing
- Marty Rifkin – dobro and pedal steel guitar on "There's No Me... Without You"
- Brian Setzer – electric guitar on "In My Arms" and "There's No Me... Without You"
- Eric Skodis – vocals
- Aaron Sterling – drums
- Courtney Taylor-Taylor – keyboards on "Strong"
- Teddy Thompson – composition
- Keith Urban
- Michael Ward – electric guitar
- Paul Westerberg – composition
- Todd Youth – electric guitar

Technical staff

- Chris Anthony – photography
- Kii Arens – cover art
- Brian Gardner – mastering
- Dave Kaplan – executive production
- Bennett Salvay – string arrangement, conducting
- Scott Silver – executive production
- Kevin Tetreault – art direction, layout
- Howard Willing – production, engineering

== Chart performance ==
Chart performance for Ghost on the Canvas
| Chart (2011) | Peak position |
|---|---|
| UK Country Albums Chart | 2 |

== See also ==
- Glen Campbell: I'll Be Me, a 2014 documentary
