= George C. Sibley =

American explorer

George Champlin Sibley
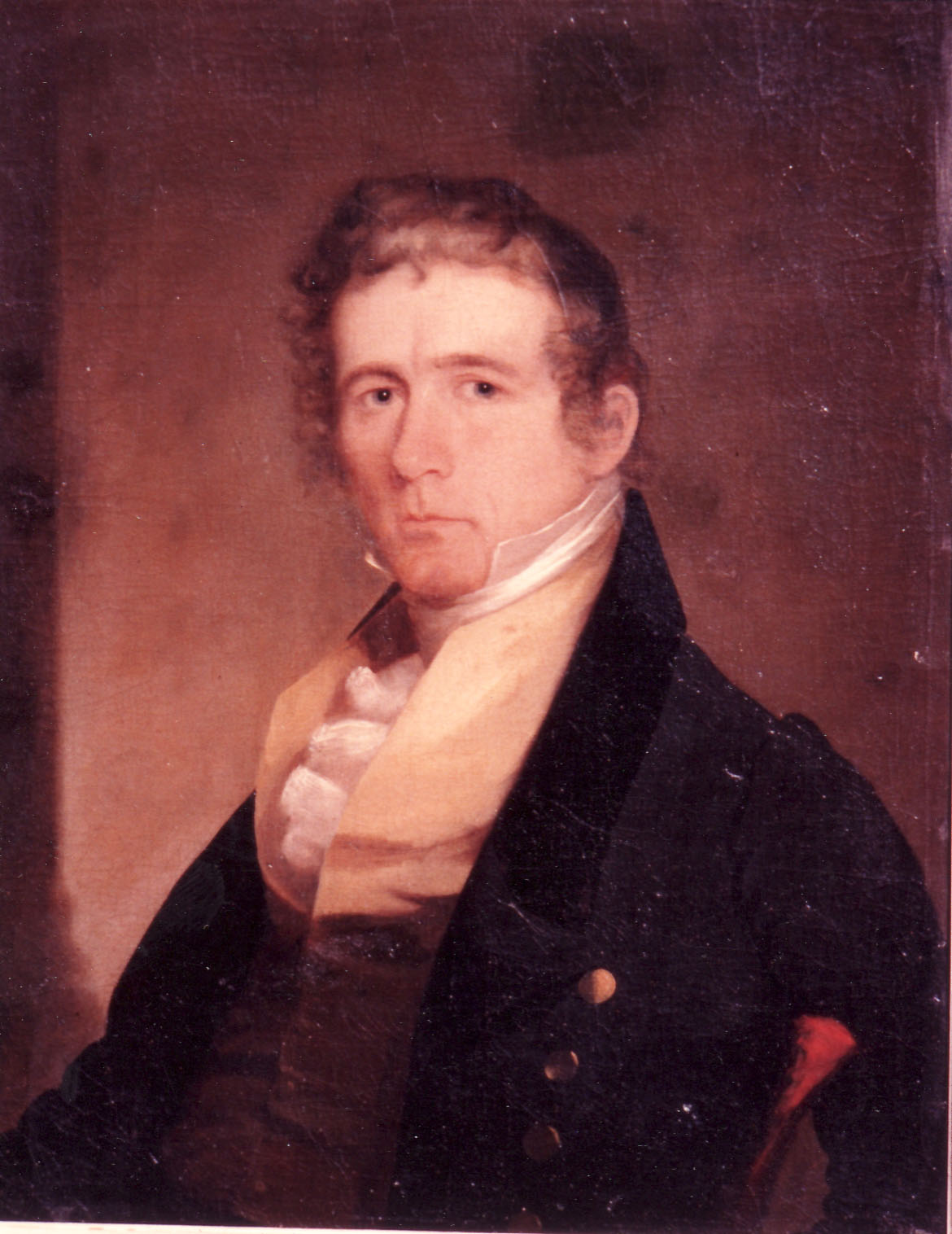
- Painting of George Sibley by Chester Harding c1830s

Personal details
- Born: April 1, 1782 Great Barrington, Massachusetts
- Died: January 31, 1863 (aged 80) St. Charles, Missouri
- Spouse: Mary Easton Sibley
- Parent(s): John and Elizabeth Sibley
- Occupation: explorer, soldier, indian agent, politician, and educator

George Champlin Sibley (April 1, 1782 – January 31, 1863) was an American explorer, soldier, Indian agent, and politician.

== Biography ==
=== Early life ===
Sibley was born in Great Barrington, Massachusetts, on April 1, 1782, the son of John and Elizabeth Sibley. Due to his father's frequent travelling, early childhood for Sibley was spent living with his Puritan grandfather, Samuel Hopkins, in Rhode Island. Later on, Sibley moved with his mother to Fayetteville, North Carolina, where he received his education and apprenticed as a bookkeeper in the counting house of John Winslow.

=== Fort Bellefontaine ===
In 1805, through his correspondence with President Thomas Jefferson, Sibley's father was appointed as an Indian agent for the U.S. government in Natchitoches, Louisiana. George Sibley used his father's acquaintance with President Jefferson to get a position as assistant factor at Fort Bellefontaine at the mouth of the Missouri River near St. Louis, Missouri.

Problems arose in 1807 between Sibley and the factor of Fort Bellefontaine, Rudolph Tillier, when Sibley questioned Tillier's bookkeeping methods. Disagreements grew between the two, to the point that Tillier fired Sibley. To defend himself, Sibley immediately undertook a trip to Washington, DC to give his side of the story.

=== Fort Osage ===
Sibley was cleared of wrongdoing because of his good reputation among friends William Clark and Acting Governor Frederick Bates. Consequently, Sibley was then given the position of factor at Fort Osage in western Missouri, near present-day Kansas City, Missouri, in 1808.

While at Fort Osage, Sibley quickly engaged in creating relationships with the neighboring Osage tribes. In 1811, he led an expedition, known as the George C. Sibley Expedition, to improve relations with the Pawnee and Kansa tribes, and also to locate the rumored Jefferson's salt mountain. Instead, he found it in the Salt Plains in northwest Oklahoma. He kept several journals of his travels, but never published them. Sometime prior to his posting to Fort Osage, Sibley purchased an enslaved man named George. In 1812, during a trip to Washington D.C., he purchased a young enslaved women named Betty. Betty and George entered a relationship with one another, and Betty had at least two children, sons George and Edward. In 1819, Sibley sold enslaved man George, husband of Betty and father of George, jr., and Edward to settle an outstanding debt. At one point Sibley claimed ownership of at least six people who he enslaved; two years before the civil war he freed that last remaining two prior to legal emancipation.

Once the War of 1812 began, Sibley briefly moved back to St. Louis because it was feared that the British would entice the local Native American tribes to attack Fort Osage. This, however, lasted briefly, because the Osage tribes complained about having to travel the extra distance to St. Louis for their trade goods. As a result, in 1813, Sibley opened a temporary trading post in Arrow Rock, Missouri, for the duration of the war.

While stationed at Fort Osage, in 1815, Sibley married Mary Easton, the daughter of prominent St. Louis attorney and Missouri's second attorney general, Rufus Easton. Sibley maintained this post until 1822, when the United States decided to formally end its Indian trade system. By this time, most of the Native Americans had been resettled outside of Missouri. After the trading post closed in 1822, George and Mary remained at Fort Osage, where he served as postmaster until the fort closed in 1825.

=== Santa Fe Trail ===
Around this time, trade between the United States and the Mexican government in Santa Fe was growing significantly. Consequently, Missouri Senator Thomas Hart Benton presented a petition to Congress to fund a survey of the road to Santa Fe. Congress granted this request, and soon after, George Sibley was put in charge of the expedition. Until this time, travelers between Missouri and Santa Fe periodically were raided by Indians along the way, so in addition to surveying the road, Sibley was required to negotiate treaties for safe passage along the route. Sibley, along with commissioners Benjamin Reeves of Missouri and Thomas Mather of Illinois, set off from Fort Osage in April 1825. The group met with leaders of the Kansa and Osage Nations along a tributary of the Neosho River, where they reached an agreement for safe passage of wagon trains and traders. In turn, Sibley named the area "Council Grove," which later became present-day Council Grove, Kansas. The group then followed the Arkansas River to the 100th Meridian, where they awaited permission from Mexico to enter their territory. Along the way from Fort Osage to this point the group erected cairns to guide future travelers. Once permission to enter Mexico was granted in September 1825, Sibley continued along the Arkansas River while Reeves and Mather returned to Missouri to report on the expedition's progress. Sibley led the remaining group along the river about forty miles, crossed at a ford and continued south toward the Cimarron River. Eventually the party reached Taos where they received permission to further survey the route in New Mexico. However, when the other commissioners failed to arrive, Sibley and crew returned to Missouri, arriving back in August 1826. The group submitted their report in 1827. By then, the high traffic to Santa Fe had blazed a clear path to follow.

=== Lindenwood years ===
Once Sibley was finished, his wife Mary and he moved to St. Charles, Missouri, where he had owned land since 1814. During 1829, the Sibleys lived in town until the property that George owned could be cleared and a residence built. During this same time, Mary, who had been recorded as having taught children at Fort Osage, began teaching her sister, along with a few local children, in their home on a private basis. Mary's career as an educator developed into The Lindenwood School for Girls, later known as Lindenwood College, and today known as Lindenwood University. By December 1829, George had built a log cabin on their property and over the years expanded the structure as enrollment at the boarding school grew to over 20 women being taught by his wife.

George had a limited role with the school, while Mary served as the school's lone headmaster and educator, George helped Mary with the maintenance on and additions to the property and cabin and also produced the advertising and most of their correspondence. George remained active in public life. In 1833, Sibley ran as a Whig for U.S. Congress, but pulled out of the race at the last moment. Between 1839 and 1840, Sibley served as president of the Missouri Internal Improvements Board and as a railroad commissioner, and in 1844, he ran for a seat in the Missouri Senate, but lost.

Privately, Sibley was very active with the Old School Presbyterian church. Through this involvement he became closely acquainted with abolitionist Elijah Lovejoy. Lovejoy, whose in-laws lived in St. Charles, visited the region often. On one occasion in 1837, after increasingly irritating area slave owners with his stories in the Alton Observer, an angry mob tried to lynch Lovejoy. Lovejoy escaped to Linden Wood, where Sibley provided him with a horse so he could get away into Illinois.

=== Retirement and death ===
After building Lindenwood College's reputation as a predominant women's school for its day, the Sibleys decided to retire from education and in 1853 deeded Lindenwood over to the Presbyterian Church. By this stage in his life, George Sibley was considered an invalid. As a result, he led a quiet life until he died on January 31, 1863. George and Mary Sibley are buried on the campus of Lindenwood University.

== Legacy ==
George C. Sibley is the namesake of Sibley, Missouri.

== Bibliography ==
- Sibley, George C. (1952). Kate Leila Gregg (ed.). The road to Santa Fe: the journal and diaries of George Champlin Sibley and others pertaining to the surveying and marking of a road from the Missouri frontier to the settlements of New Mexico, 1825-1827. University of New Mexico Press.
- Sibley, George C. (2003). Jeffrey E Smith (ed.). Seeking a Newer World, 1808-1811: The Fort Osage Journals and Letters of George Sibley. Lindenwood University Press.
