= Stanley Andrisse =

American endocrinologist scientist

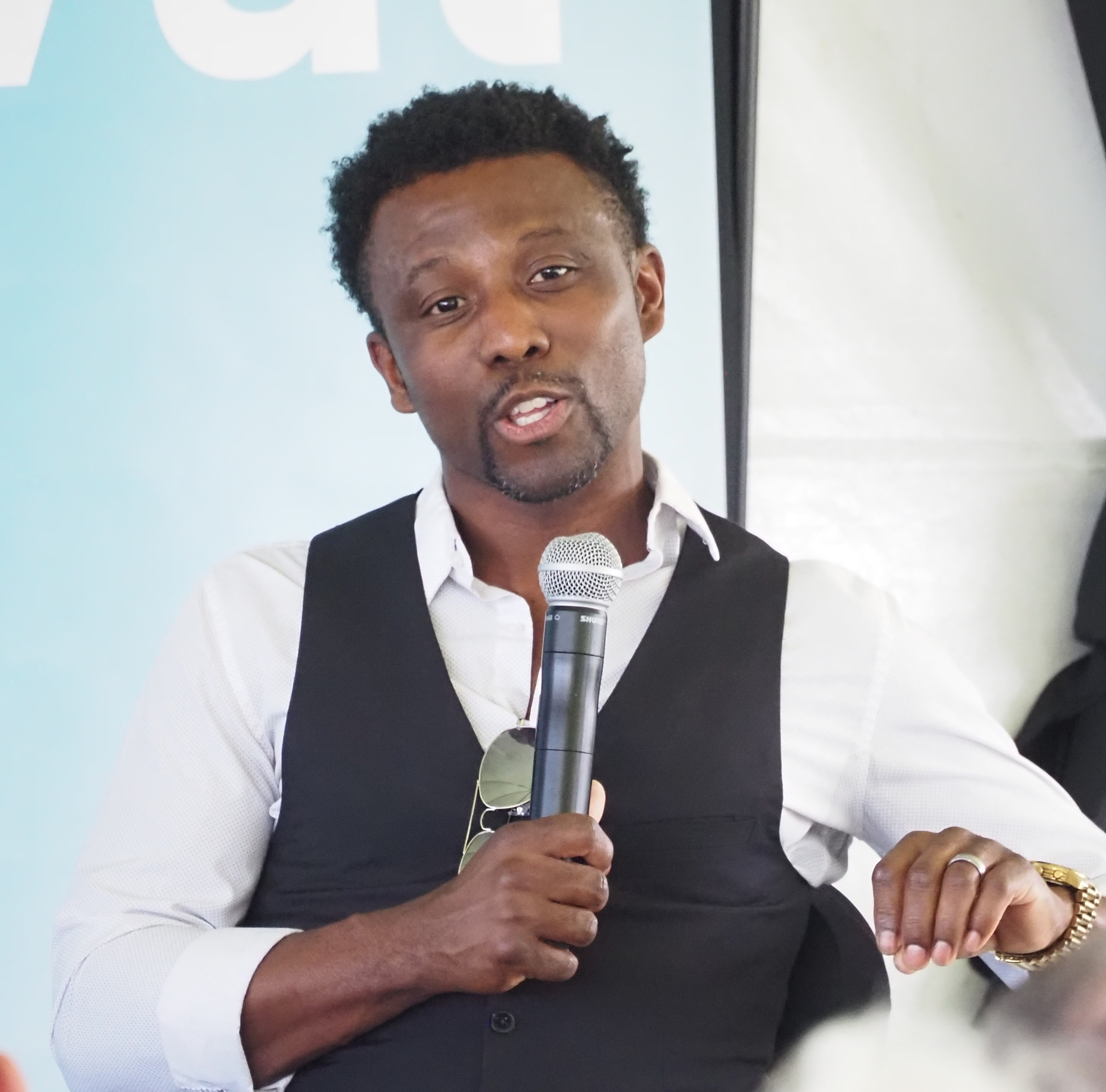
- Andrisse at the 2026 Gaithersburg Book Festival
- Born: September 8, 1983 (age 43); Missouri, U.S.
- Education: Lindenwood University (BA, MBA); Saint Louis University (PhD)
- Scientific career
- Workplaces: Johns Hopkins University; Howard University College of Medicine
- Website: From Prison Cells to PhD

Stanley Andrisse (born September 8, 1983) is an American endocrinologist scientist and writer.

He is a tenured associate professor at the Howard University College of Medicine and Georgetown Medical Center. His research considers Type 2 diabetes, the pathways of insulin resistant states, and metabolic disease.

He is the author of From Prison Cells to PhD: It is Never Too Late to Do Good, and director of an outreach program that supports formerly incarcerated people into college education.

== Early life and education ==
Andrisse was born to Haitian immigrants Pierre Frederic William Andrisse and Yorvoll Joseph in Missouri. Andrisse has three siblings. Andrisse attended Rosary High School (now part of Trinity Catholic High School (Missouri)). While there, Andrisse earned an A-grade average in both the 1998-99 and 1999-00 academic years and played on the high school's football team as a running back.

Andrisse has said that he made poor decisions as a young person, and he was first arrested at the age of 14. By his early twenties he had been sentenced to ten years in maximum security penitentiary. During his time in prison he was part of a drug rehabilitation program.

Andrisse was an undergraduate student at Lindenwood University. He remained at Lindenwood for graduate studies, where he worked toward a Master of Business Administration. He was accepted to a doctoral program at Saint Louis University, and completed his PhD in 2014.

== Research and career ==
After earning his doctorate he was appointed a postdoctoral fellow at Johns Hopkins University.

Andrisse is an endocrinologist at Howard University College of Medicine, where he studies type 2 diabetes and insulin resistance.

In 2017, Andrisse was named a Leading with Conviction Fellow by JustLeadershipUSA. In this capacity, he works to reduce the prison population by 50% by 2030. Andrisse's first book, From Prison Cells to PhD: It is Never Too Late to Do Good, was published by Simon & Schuster in 2021. He established a nonprofit program to provide mentoring to current and former incarcerated people so that they can start building their careers after leaving prison. Throughout his career he supported over 60 students, helping those from marginalized communities pursue careers in medicine and research.

== Books ==
- Andrisse, Stanley (August 17, 2021). From Prison Cells to PhD: It Is Never Too Late to Do Good. Post Hill Press. ISBN 978-1642939408.

== Selected publications ==
- Yaping Ma; Stanley Andrisse; Yi Chen; et al. (November 14, 2016). "Androgen Receptor in the Ovary Theca Cells Plays a Critical Role in Androgen-Induced Reproductive Dysfunction". Endocrinology. 158 (1): 98–108. doi:10.1210/EN.2016-1608. ISSN 0013-7227. PMC 5412974. PMID 27841936.
- Stanley Andrisse; Rikki M Koehler; Joseph E Chen; Gaytri D Patel; Vivek R Vallurupalli; Benjamin A Ratliff; Daniel E Warren; Jonathan Fisher (March 25, 2014). "Role of GLUT1 in regulation of reactive oxygen species". Redox Biology. 2: 764–771. doi:10.1016/J.REDOX.2014.03.004. ISSN 2213-2317. PMC 4116627. PMID 25101238.
- Stanley Andrisse; Gaytri D Patel; Joseph E Chen; et al. (June 11, 2013). "ATM and GLUT1-S490 phosphorylation regulate GLUT1 mediated transport in skeletal muscle". PLOS One. 8 (6) e66027. Bibcode:2013PLoSO...866027A. doi:10.1371/JOURNAL.PONE.0066027. ISSN 1932-6203. PMC 3679034. PMID 23776597.
