= Lou Brock Sports Complex =

Athletic complex in St. Charles, Missouri

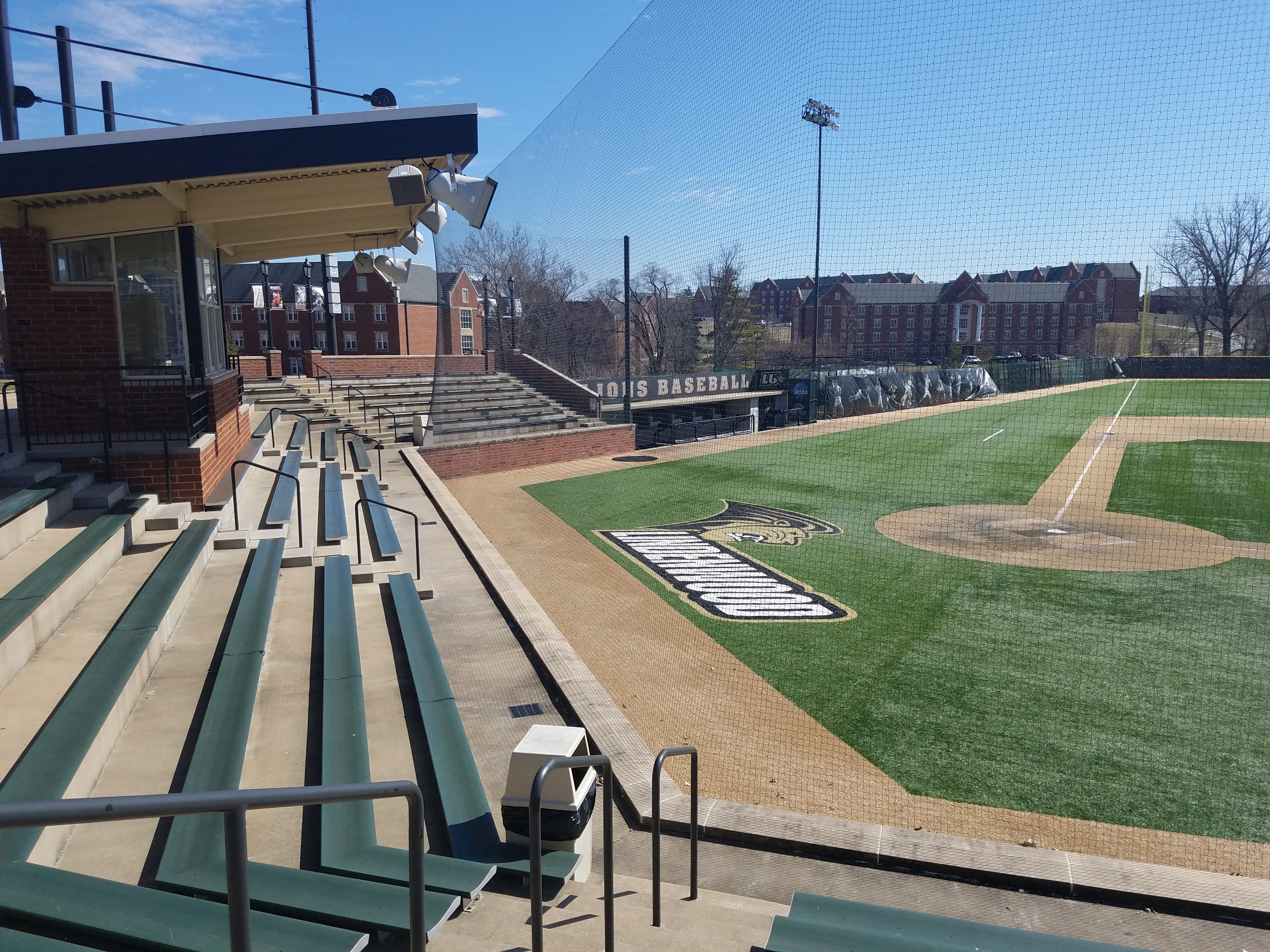
- Interactive map of Lou Brock Sports Complex
- Location: St. Charles, Missouri
- Coordinates: 38.7872°N 90.5067°W
- Owner: Lindenwood University
- Operator: Lindenwood University
- Capacity: 700 (baseball); 300 (softball)
- Surface: Enviroturf (synthetic grass)
- Field size: Left Field - 322 ft Center Field - 385 ft Right Field - 322 ft

Construction
- Opened: 2005

Tenant
- Lindenwood Lions (NCAA)

Lou Brock Sports Complex is college athletic complex located in St. Charles, Missouri that includes a baseball stadium and softball stadium. It is the home field of the Lindenwood University Lions baseball and softball teams. It is named after former St. Louis Cardinals player and member of the National Baseball Hall of Fame, Lou Brock. The Sports Complex was built in 2005 under the university's expansion plans. It has hosted NAIA regional tournaments along with the 2009 NAIA Baseball National Championship Opening Round.

The baseball stadium at Lou Brock features permanent, bleacher seating for 700 spectators. These seats wrap around the foul territory behind home plate. The adjacent softball field features seating for around 300 spectators behind homeplate. a Clubhouse is located down the right field line of the baseball field and contains space for a variety of functions for the team and includes the team's locker room. Both fields include a pressbox, which enables radio broadcasts and is used by media members and game day staff. A concession stand is located in a concourse between the baseball field and softball field.
