= Lindenwood Hall =

- U.S. National Register of Historic Places
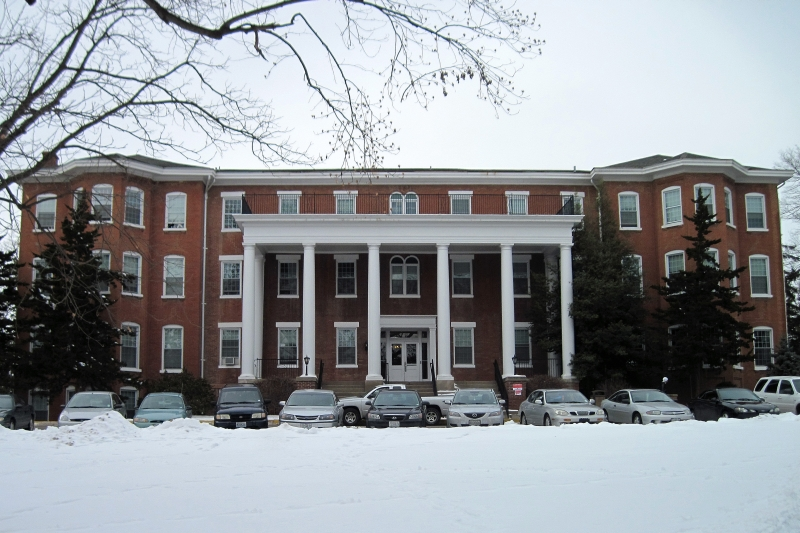
- Lindenwood Hall, January 2011

- Location within Missouri Location within the United States
- Location: Lindenwood Colleges campus, St. Charles, Missouri
- Coordinates: 38°47′14″N 90°29′58″W
- Area: 0.4 acres (0.16 ha)
- Built: 1857, 1881, 1887
- Architect: Sawyer, I.O., et al.
- Architectural style: Classical Revival, Italianate
- NRHP reference No.: 78003131
- Added to NRHP: November 29, 1978

Lindenwood Hall, also known as Sibley Hall, is a historic building located on the campus of Lindenwood University at St. Charles, Missouri, United States. The original section was built in 1857, with wings added in 1881 and 1887. The original section is a three-story plus full basement, rectangular, red brick building measuring 73 feet (22 m) wide by 48 feet (15 m) deep. It has Classical Revival and Italianate style detailing including a two-story front portico, paired arched windows, and a low hipped roof. The three-story brick wings resulted in a U-shaped plan and feature three-story, three sided bay windows.

It was added to the National Register of Historic Places in 1978.
