= Missouri Digital Heritage Initiative =

Collaborative effort expanding amount of information

The Missouri Digital Heritage Initiative is a collaborative effort that expands the amount of information available online about Missouri's past. In 2007, Secretary of State Robin Carnahan proposed this landmark initiative to further Missourians’ access to information about the history of Missouri and local communities.

Through the Missouri Digital Heritage Initiative, the Missouri State Archives and the Missouri State Library, in partnership with the State Historical Society of Missouri, are assisting institutions across the state in digitizing their records and placing them online for easy access.

The Missouri Digital Heritage Initiative also offers classroom curricula based on the Department of Elementary and Secondary Education's standards to enable students and others to understand their heritage through the use of primary materials. Teachers, parents, and students can retrieve educational materials directly from the website.

The Missouri Digital Heritage Initiative is funded by LSTA (Library Services & Technology Act) funds distributed by the federal Institute of Museum & Library Services and administered through the grant programs of the Missouri State Library, a division of the Secretary of State's Office, Jay Ashcroft, Secretary of State. The Missouri Digital Heritage Initiative replaces the Virtually Missouri project.
