= Mary Easton Sibley =

American educator

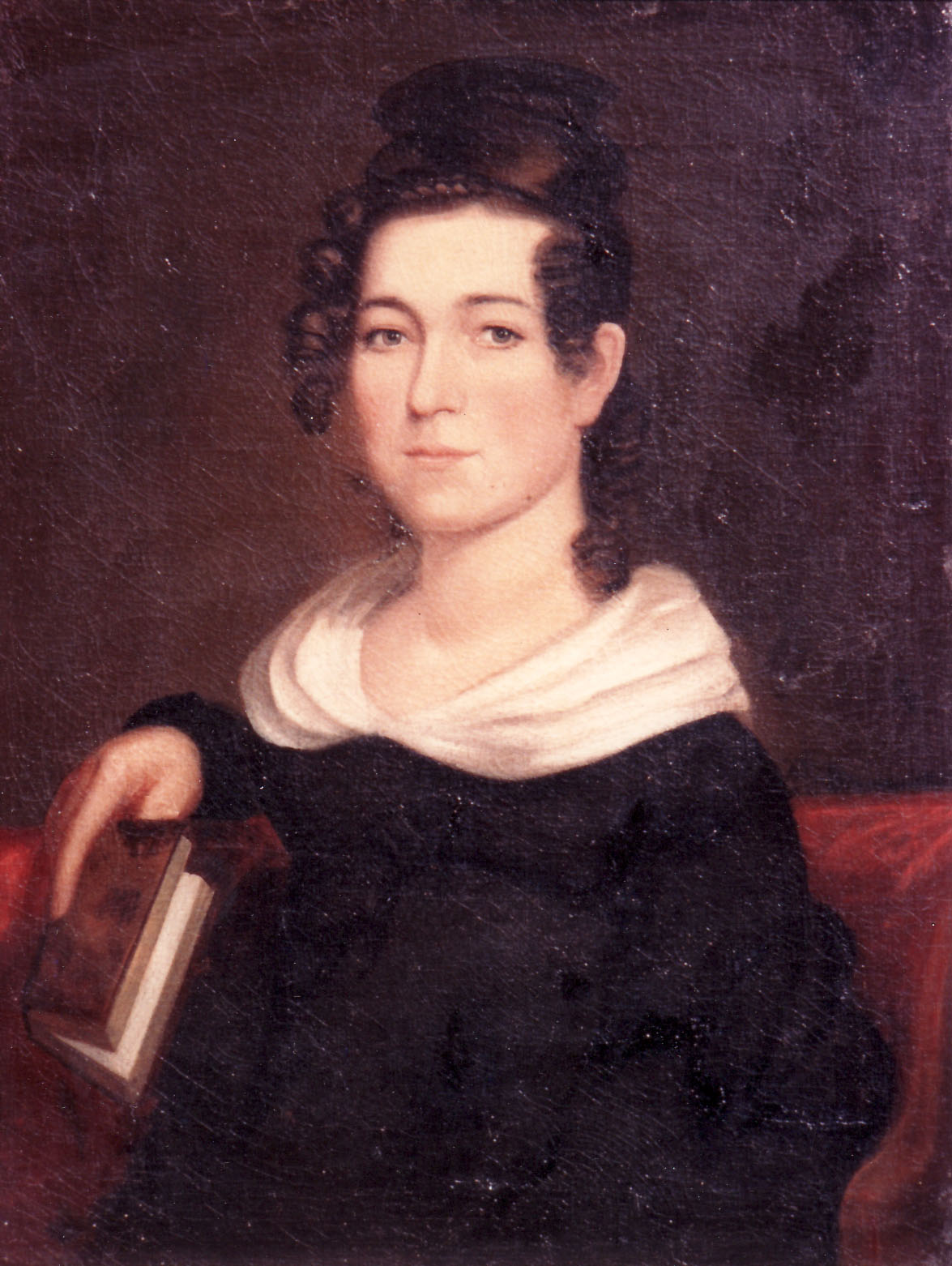
- Painting of Mary Easton Sibley by Chester Harding c1830s

Personal details
- Born: January 24, 1800 Rome, New York
- Died: June 20, 1878 (aged 78) St. Charles, Missouri
- Spouse: George Champlin Sibley
- Parent(s): Rufus and Alby Smith Easton
- Occupation: early American pioneer and educator

Mary Easton Sibley (January 24, 1800 – June 20, 1878) was an early American pioneer and educator. She and her husband George Sibley founded a school that became Lindenwood University.

== Early life ==
Mary Sibley was born in Rome, New York on January 24, 1800, the daughter of Rufus Easton and Alby Abial Easton. She was the first of eleven children for the Easton family. Mary's father's family was from England and settled in Connecticut in the 1640s. The family helped found Hartford, Connecticut. Her mother's family was also from an educated colonial family. The two met in New York and married in 1798, when Alby was only 15 years old.

In 1804, Rufus Easton learned that his former law professor and attorney general of the District of Louisiana, Ephraim Kirby, had died. When the position became available, President Thomas Jefferson asked Easton to consider the appointment. Easton accepted and applied for a license to practice law in Indiana Territory. He set out for St. Louis. Easton would be attorney general of the largest land jurisdiction in the United States. By September 1804, the Easton family had settled in Ste. Genevieve, Missouri.

In addition to his duties as judge, Easton was asked by President Jefferson to keep an eye on the Territorial Governor, General James Wilkinson, because he was suspected of collaborating with Vice President Aaron Burr to cause the western part of the United States to secede and form a separate country.

While little is known of Sibley’s early life, family records state that for a period she was sent to boarding school in Lexington, Kentucky. It is likely that Sibley attended Shelbyville Female Academy when she was 14 or 15 between 1813 and her marriage in 1815.

== Personal life ==
According to Sibley’s diaries, sometime prior to 1815 she had returned to her family in St. Louis. It was during this time that she would frequent dances with her friend. Mary met George Champlin Sibley one evening in 1814. Mary later said she first met George at a dinner party at her parents' house, but it is possible that the two met at a dance at one of the surrounding forts. George knew Mary's father and the two had collaborated on a business or legal matter previously, though the extent of this collaboration is not known. Rufus Easton was a land speculator and George Sibley was interested in developing the area around Fort Osage. While little is known about Mary and George's courtship, after they met, George only had eyes for Mary. Mary was only fourteen years old, while George was thirty-two. They married on August 19, 1815. Mary was only 15 when married.

Mary and George never had any children.

== Fort Osage ==
George operated an Indian trading post at Fort Osage on the Missouri River. He was the factor of Fort Osage, which meant he was not only a fur trader, but was an official representative of the United States government at what was then the westernmost post. After they were married, in March 1816, the Sibleys returned to Fort Osage. One of Mary's sisters accompanied them, likely as much to avoid homesickness as to provide companionship. There were very few women at Fort Osage, and most were wives of Sibley's employees, soldiers, or other locals. None were considered of sufficient social status to socialize with Mary.

Once at Fort Osage, George kept busy trading goods with the Natives and maintaining good relations with local Indian tribes, occasionally negotiating treaties for the United States. George was also responsible for watching for British activity on the Missouri River. Several biographers believe that Mary began her interest in teaching when she noticed that the few area children were not receiving an education.

George and Mary both believed that the best solution to the "Indian problem" was education and assimilation into Euro-American society. Although neither were particularly religious, George helped the United Mission Society of New York select a site for mission work in 1821. The Sibleys also helped missionaries with supplies and used their relationships with the Osage on the mission's behalf. When Sans Oreille, a chief of the Little Osage died, the Sibleys took in his daughter. The girl came under the Sibley's care after payment of a blanket and trade cloth to her mother. She took the name Mary Sibley.

Mary remained with George at Fort Osage until it closed in 1822. The Sibleys remained in the area, on a farm they had developed. In 1824, according to a tax assessor, the farm had five slaves, many horses, and 30 cattle.

Between 1822 and 1825, George was the postmaster general for the area, along with trying unsuccessfully to start up a privately owned trading post. George attempted to go into business setting up a trading post with two former employees, but the collapse of the business put him so far in debt it took him ten years to recover. When the trading post failed, George found work as the lead commissioner which surveyed what became known as the Santa Fe Trail, in 1825.

== Move to St. Charles, Missouri ==
George's job on the Santa Fe Trail did not earn him enough to repay his debts. He had to sell most of his land holdings to break even. Mary visited family members for an extended period of time between 1827 and 1828, and afterwards did not return to the farm at Osage with George. Mary chose to stay with her parents in St. Charles. George followed her a few months later and the two settled on some land George owned just outside of town. The couple established a new farm in 1829, which they named Linden Wood. The farm prospered.

Because of the numerous Linden trees on this property, the Sibleys named the property Linden Wood. While George cleared the land for farming, the couple lived in town until a home was built on the property in 1829.

George was content to farm the land, but Mary grew bored. George no longer held a government office and they were too far from town to socialize much. It is not known exactly why Mary decided to start a school for girls at Linden Wood, but it may be that she wanted to help George pay off his debt, her "social conscience" had been awakened, or that the school and teaching would allow her to express her individuality. Although the reasons for its establishment are not known, Mary started a school for girls at Linden Wood in 1832.

== The development of Lindenwood ==
In 1829, as the Sibleys settled in St. Charles, Mary began teaching her sister, Louisa, and a few town girls from her home. By December 1829, a log cabin was built at Linden Wood. As Mary's vision for a school solidified, this building became the initial building used for Lindenwood Female College when it was formed in 1832.

By 1839, the school at Lindenwood cost three dollars a week for tuition, board, and school supplies. Students learned French and German, music, art, and Protestant virtues of piety and personal responsibility. In the 1840s, enrollment increased, requiring additional instructors. Around this time, the Sibleys were also operating a day school for boys and girls in St. Charles. That school had forty-nine students for the 1839 fall term. Both of the Sibleys' schools closed in 1841, however, due to economic stress in the region and problems hiring teachers who met Mary's standards. The schools were reopened in 1842, but were not without their problems.

As finances became tight for the college in 1843, Mary traveled east to raise money. She succeeded in raising approximately $4,000, enough to keep the school in operation. In 1853, George and Mary Sibley donated 120 acres of land to the school and Lindenwood Female College incorporated with a 15-man board of directors. The board helped appoint professors, teachers, and developed the school's curriculum.

== Mary’s spiritual awakening ==
According to Sibley’s diaries, she grew up in a home where religion was inconsequential. This view toward religion lasted until the early years of the Second Great Awakening, after which she became an ardent Old School Presbyterian.

Around the time Mary opened Lindenwood, she met Margaret Lindsey, who along with her husband were pillars of the local Presbyterian church. Margaret became like a second mother to Mary. With Margaret's influence, Mary became interested in religion. Margaret fell seriously ill some time later, and Mary sat with her friend for a week. The vigil became an extended prayer meeting with other members from the church. On March 25, still dealing with her friend's death, Mary professed her faith at a Presbyterian meeting and was admitted to the church. Her family was shocked. Mary's husband and family were Christians, but non-sectarian. They were suspicious of organized religion and particularly evangelical preachers. George disapproved of her new interest in the church, and her mother said she would've rather seen her children die than see them become Presbyterians. Mary attempted to bring her sister to a church meeting, but her mother refused to let her go. Mary and her mother did not speak for a year or more after the fight.

Through Mary’s influence, George was converted a few years afterward. Due to the preeminent role of religion in the Sibleys' lives, Mary incorporated her faith into her continued interest in educating the area youth. Mary required her students to attend Sunday worship, Sunday school, daily prayer sessions, and Bible readings. She was also able to convert several of her students.

After joining the church, Mary's views on moral and social reform became more radical. By January 1834, Mary was contributing articles to the St. Louis Observer, a newspaper known for its anti-Catholic and anti-slavery stance. Mary wrote anti-Catholic pieces often, and she also wrote on other religious topics and slavery. She also contributed to other evangelical and reformist newspapers.

She writes in her diary about schooling the children of newly arrived German immigrants using a bilingual Bible to teach English. Additional attempts at education were made with the region’s slaves, but as fearful slaveowners worried about a potential rebellion from enlightened blacks, Sibley was quickly forced to stop. Ultimately, the Sibleys' faith was the focal point of the women’s college they opened and named after their property, Lindenwood College (today known as Lindenwood University).

== Later life and death ==
After her husband died in 1863, Mary sold her house and moved to St. Louis. Between 1866 and 1869, Mary joined an organization created by a prominent St. Louis philanthropist, James E. Yeatman. Named Bethany House, the organization was for missionary nurses to work with the St. Louis poor. Bethany House was struggling, and in December 1866, Mary was asked to take charge and revitalize it. She often clashed with volunteers and clergy and her grand plans for building a hospital and other projects were more than the financial backers wanted to take on. In 1868, Yeatman and other backers withdrew their funding and Bethany House closed.

Once Bethany House closed in 1868, Mary moved back to St. Charles at Linden Wood. Near the end of her life, Mary became involved in the Second Adventist Movement . In 1873, Mary received a letter from a Japanese man named Isaac K. Yokoyama, who requested that she send educators to Japan who could also spread Christianity. In her mid 70s, Mary took it upon herself to serve as a missionary/educator and set out for the West Coast, en route to Japan. Mary left from New York City by boat to Panama, crossed the isthmus, and traveled to California. Mary became ill before she could board the ship for Japan. On June 20, 1878, Mary Sibley died at the age of 78. She is buried with her family in a cemetery located at Lindenwood University.

== See also ==
- St. Charles, Missouri
- Lindenwood University
