= MOBIUS =

Consortium of libraries in Missouri and nearby U.S. states

- Formation: 1998; 28 years ago
- Type: Nonprofit
- Headquarters: Columbia, Missouri, US
- Region served: Missouri, Arkansas, Kansas, Iowa, Texas
- Executive Director: Donna Bacon
- Website: mobiusconsortium.org

MOBIUS is a consortium of libraries in Missouri and several nearby U.S states. It is based in Columbia, Missouri.

== Formation ==
MOBIUS was originally established in 1998 by 50 libraries representing Missouri colleges and universities, with the University of Missouri acting as a host institution. The name was originally an acronym for Missouri Bibliographic Information User System, although the organization no longer uses it as such. In 2010 MOBIUS separated from the University of Missouri and became a Missouri not-for-profit corporation. The Tulsa City-County Library system became the first out-of-state member in 2014.

== Membership ==
As of 2020 the consortium includes 66 academic libraries, 7 public libraries, 3 special libraries, and the Missouri State Library, serving a total of 213 physical branches. The MOBIUS Union Catalog includes over 29 million items. Member libraries extend into Oklahoma, Iowa, Kansas, and Texas.
