= Howard J. Wall =

Howard J. Wall is an American economist who is the director of the Center for Regional Economic Research at the University of Tennessee at Chattanooga. He previously founded and directed the Center for Applied Economics and the Hammond Institute for Free Enterprise at Lindenwood University, St. Charles, Missouri. Prior to that Wall was a vice president at the Federal Reserve Bank of St. Louis, and taught at West Virginia University and Birkbeck, University of London.

== Education ==
Wall received his B.A. from the State University of New York at Binghamton and his M.A. and Ph.D. from the University of Buffalo.

== Research ==
Wall has written or co-written 75 papers, which have been cited almost 5,900 times. His work has been published in the Review of Economics and Statistics, The Economic Journal, Journal of Urban Economics, Journal of Money and Banking, and other outlets.
