= J. Scheidegger Center for the Arts =

Coordinates: 38.7866°N 90.5019°W

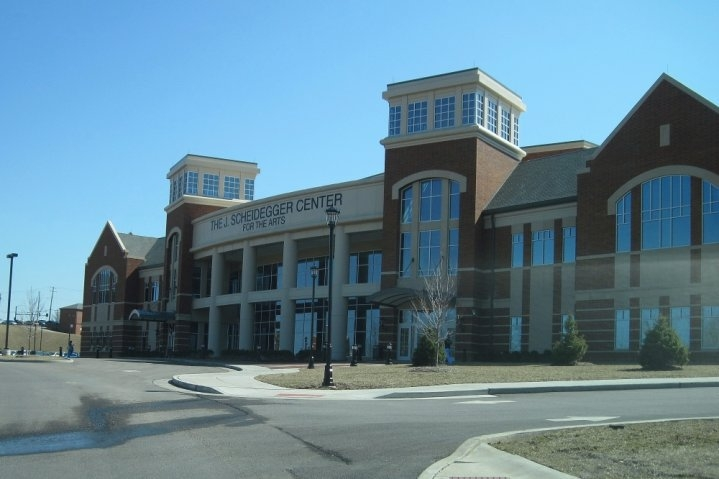
J. Scheidegger Center for the Arts

J. Scheidegger Center for the Arts was opened in 2008 in St. Charles, Missouri, United States, on the campus of the Lindenwood University as a $32 million, 138,000-square-foot (12,800 m^{2}) educational and performing arts complex. The facility is named after a $2 million donation from Jerry Scheidegger, Lindenwood board member, St. Louis businessman, as well as the founder and chairman of The Corporate Group Inc., a commercial and residential real estate leasing firm.

== Performance facilities ==
Lindenwood Family Theater, with 1,200 seats on two levels, it is the largest of the venues at the Center and features a high tech Broadway-style theater.

Emerson Black Box Theatre, a small theatre with 250 seats, is a black box theatre designed to support experimental performances. It is primarily intended for small productions. This theater is equipped with a movable stage allowing the theater to be reconfigured depending on the need of the production.

The Boyle Art Gallery is a large, modern gallery facility used for showing of LU student, as well as art ranging from local to international artists.

== Educational space ==
In addition to the performance areas the facility is used by performing arts and communications students and features classrooms and faculty offices. the center is the home of the School of Fine and Performing Arts. A large scene shop and a costume shop. Two dance studios with digital recording and instant review capability. LUTV's Charter HD Studio- a tapeless high-definition TV studio with sets for talk shows, news, weather, and Lindenwood Lions athletics that the station airs on local Public-access television and AT&T U-verse. Performance practice space with Steinway grand pianos and Chorus and orchestra rooms.

== Notable Performances ==
- Hal Holbrook - October 2008
- Liza Minnelli - September 2008
- Glen Campbell - September 2011
- Patti LaBelle - March 2019

== See also ==
- List of concert halls
