= Missouri State Library =

Official State Library of Missouri

Coordinates: 38.5837°N 92.1781°W

Agency overview
- Jurisdiction: State of Missouri
- Headquarters: 600 W. Main St. Jefferson City, MO
- Annual budget: $3,139,047 (2022)
- Agency executive: Robin Westphal, State Librarian
- Parent agency: Missouri Secretary of State
- Website: www.sos.mo.gov/library

The Missouri State Library (MSL) is the official State Library of Missouri located in Jefferson City, Missouri. MSL provides library and reference services directly to the executive and legislative branches of the state's government. They support libraries in Missouri with resource sharing and continuing education programs as well as oversee state certification for public libraries. They also oversee Missouri Digital Heritage with the Missouri State Archives.

They publish the Missouri Public Library Standards, maintain a directory of all the libraries in the state, the Wolfner News, and an e-newsletter called the Show Me Express. They also create reference guides for other state agencies in Missouri. The Wolfner Talking Book and Braille Library is housed within the State Library and offers free library services to anyone who is unable to read print materials.

== See also ==
- List of libraries in the United States
