= The Singles Collection 1984/1990 =

Greatest hits album by Jimmy Somerville, Bronski Beat and The Communards
- Released: 12 November 1990
- Genre: Synth-pop; Hi-NRG; dance
- Label: London
- Producer: Mike Thorne; Stephen Hague; Pascal Gabriel

Jimmy Somerville, Bronski Beat and The Communards chronology
| Read My Lips (1989) | The Singles Collection 1984/1990 (1990) | Dare to Love (1995) |

Singles from The Singles Collection 1984/1990
- 1. "To Love Somebody" Released: 22 October 1990; 2. "Run from Love" Released: 29 July 1991

The Singles Collection 1984/1990 is a greatest hits album covering Scottish pop singer Jimmy Somerville's career in the bands Bronski Beat, The Communards and as a solo artist. It was released in 1990. In Italy, the album was marketed under the alternate title 1984/1990 Greatest Hits.

== Content ==
The Singles Collection 1984/1990 includes the first four singles by Bronski Beat, released in 1984 and 1985, which feature Somerville as lead singer; following his departure from Bronski Beat the band had three further hits ("Hit That Perfect Beat", "C'mon C'mon" and "Cha Cha Heels") but they are not included on the album as it is intended as a retrospective of Somerville's career. It also includes all eight singles released by The Communards, from 1985 to 1988, plus Somerville's first three singles under his own name (including one duet) from 1989 up to the time of the album's release. The album also contains two new songs—a cover of the Bee Gees' "To Love Somebody", which was released as a single to promote the album, reaching number eight in the UK Singles Chart—and a re-recording of "Run from Love", a track originally included on the 1985 Bronski Beat remix album, Hundreds & Thousands; the new version of the song was later remixed for release as a single in 1991, reaching number 52 in the UK.

== Critical reception ==
Professional ratings
Review scores
| Source | Rating |
|---|---|
| AllMusic | 4/5 stars |
| Calgary Herald | B |
| Encyclopedia of Popular Music | 4/5 stars |
| NME | 6/10 |

Dave Obee from Calgary Herald wrote, "Those glittering disco ceiling balls have all been recycled away, but we've still got Jimmy Somerville. The British singer's soaring vocals give an elegant and emotional feel to the 17 cuts on this compilation of his best work. Yes, it's techno-pop dance music, but Somerville's singing keeps it from sounding stale. The disc includes some of his work with Bronski Beat, including "Smalltown Boy", but the real strength is in the diverse selection of songs Somerville has covered."

== Track listing ==
| No. | Title | Writer(s) | From album | Length |
|---|---|---|---|---|
| 1. | "Smalltown Boy" (Bronski Beat) | Jimmy Somerville; Larry Steinbachek; Steve Bronski | The Age of Consent | 5:01 |
| 2. | "Don't Leave Me This Way" (The Communards with Sarah Jane Morris) | Kenneth Gamble; Leon Huff; Cary Gilbert | Communards | 4:33 |
| 3. | "It Ain't Necessarily So" (Bronski Beat) | George Gershwin; Ira Gershwin | The Age of Consent | 4:08 |
| 4. | "To Love Somebody" (Jimmy Somerville) | Barry Gibb; Robin Gibb | new song | 4:19 |
| 5. | "Comment te dire adieu" (Jimmy Somerville featuring June Miles-Kingston) | Jack Gold; Arnold Goland; Serge Gainsbourg | Read My Lips | 3:37 |
| 6. | "Run from Love" (Bronski Beat featuring Claudia Brücken) | Somerville; Steinbachek; Bronski | Hundreds & Thousands | 4:39 |
| 7. | "Never Can Say Goodbye" (The Communards) | Clifton Davis | Red | 4:28 |
| 8. | "Why?" (Bronski Beat) | Somerville; Steinbachek; Bronski | The Age of Consent | 3:57 |
| 9. | "You Are My World" (The Communards) | Somerville; Richard Coles | Communards | 4:31 |
| 10. | "For a Friend" (The Communards) | Somerville; Coles | Red | 4:38 |
| 11. | "I Feel Love/Johnny Remember Me" (Bronski Beat with Marc Almond) | Giorgio Moroder; Pete Bellotte; Donna Summer; Geoff Goddard | Hundreds & Thousands | 5:48 |
| 12. | "There's More to Love (Than Boy Meets Girl)" (The Communards) | Somerville; Coles | Red | 3:53 |
| 13. | "So Cold the Night" (The Communards) | Somerville; Coles | Communards | 4:41 |
| 14. | "You Make Me Feel (Mighty Real)" (Jimmy Somerville) | Sylvester James; Dip Warrick | Read My Lips | 3:58 |
| 15. | "Tomorrow" (The Communards) | Somerville; Coles | Red | 4:50 |
| 16. | "Disenchanted" (The Communards) | Somerville; Coles | Communards | 4:11 |
| 17. | "Read My Lips (Enough Is Enough)" (Jimmy Somerville) | Somerville | Read My Lips | 4:51 |

== Production ==
Adapted from the album's liner notes.

- Tracks 1–3, 8, 9, 11, 13 & 16 produced by Mike Thorne
- Tracks 4, 7, 10, 12, 14 & 15 produced by Stephen Hague
- Tracks 5 & 6 produced by Pascal Gabriel
- Track 17 produced by Pascal Gabriel; additional production and mix by Stephen Hague
- Photography by Paul Cox
- Sleeve design by Peter Barrett and Andrew Biscomb

== Charts ==
=== Weekly charts ===
| Chart (1990–91) | Peak position |
|---|---|
| Australian Albums (ARIA) | 114 |
| Austrian Albums Chart | 10 |
| Belgian Albums Chart | 10 |
| Dutch Albums Chart | 6 |
| European Albums Chart | 7 |
| French Albums Chart | 4 |
| German Albums Chart | 4 |
| Hungarian Albums Chart | 21 |
| Irish Albums Chart | 5 |
| Italian Albums Chart (Musica e dischi) | 12 |
| New Zealand Albums Chart | 30 |
| Swedish Albums Chart | 47 |
| Swiss Albums Chart | 4 |
| UK Albums Chart | 4 |

=== Year-end charts ===
| Chart (1991) | Position |
|---|---|
| German Albums (Offizielle Top 100) | 14 |
| UK Albums (MRIB) | 49 |

== Certifications and sales ==
| Region | Certification | Certified units/sales |
|---|---|---|
| France (SNEP) | Platinum | 300,000^{*} |
^{*} Sales figures based on certification alone.
