= Mark Ashton =

British gay rights activist (1960–1987)

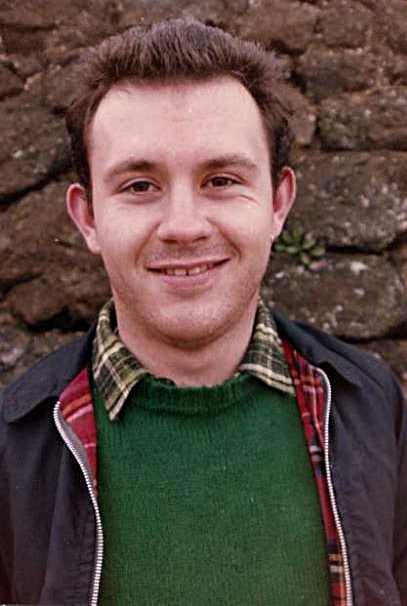
- Mark Ashton in 1986
- Born: 19 May 1960; Oldham, Lancashire, England
- Died: 11 February 1987 (aged 26); Southwark, London, England
- Education: Northern Ireland Hotel and Catering College
- Occupations: Gay rights activist, General Secretary of the Young Communist League
- Political party: Communist Party of Great Britain
- Movement: Lesbians and Gays Support the Miners 1984–1985 (co-founder); Young Communist League 1982–1987 (General Secretary 1985–1986)

Mark Christian Ashton (19 May 1960 – 11 February 1987) was a British gay rights activist and co-founder of the Lesbians and Gays Support the Miners (LGSM) support group. He was a member of the Communist Party of Great Britain and general secretary of the Young Communist League.

== Biography ==
Ashton was born in Oldham, and moved to Portrush, County Antrim, Northern Ireland, where he grew up. He studied at the former Northern Ireland Hotel and Catering College in Portrush, before moving to London in 1978. Richard Coles wrote about this period: "Mark also worked for a while as a barman at the Conservative Club in King's Cross, or, rather, as a barmaid, in drag, with a blonde beehive wig. I was never sure if the patrons worked out that he was really a man".

In 1982, Ashton spent three months in Bangladesh visiting his parents, where his father was working for the textile machinery industry. The experience of his sojourn had a profound effect on him. Upon his return, he volunteered with the London Lesbian and Gay Switchboard, supported the Campaign for Nuclear Disarmament and joined the Young Communist League (YCL). In 1983 he featured in the Lesbian and Gay Youth Video Project film Framed Youth: The Revenge of the Teenage Perverts, an early documentary that won the Grierson Award 1984 for Best Documentary.

He formed, with his friend Mike Jackson, the Lesbians and Gays Support the Miners (LGSM) support group after the two men collected donations for the miners on strike at the 1984 Lesbian and Gay Pride march in London. The group was formed in Ashton's flat in Claydon House on the Heygate Estate, Elephant and Castle.

After LGSM, he became involved in the Red Wedge collective and became the General Secretary of the Young Communist League from 1985 to 1986.

Diagnosed with HIV/AIDS, Ashton was admitted to Guy's Hospital on 30 January 1987 and died 12 days later of Pneumocystis pneumonia. His death prompted a significant response from the gay community, particularly in publicising and attending his funeral at Lambeth Cemetery.

== Personal life ==
A friend of Ashton's, Chris Birch, described him in 2014 as "a lapsed Catholic who still went to mass very occasionally".

== Legacy ==
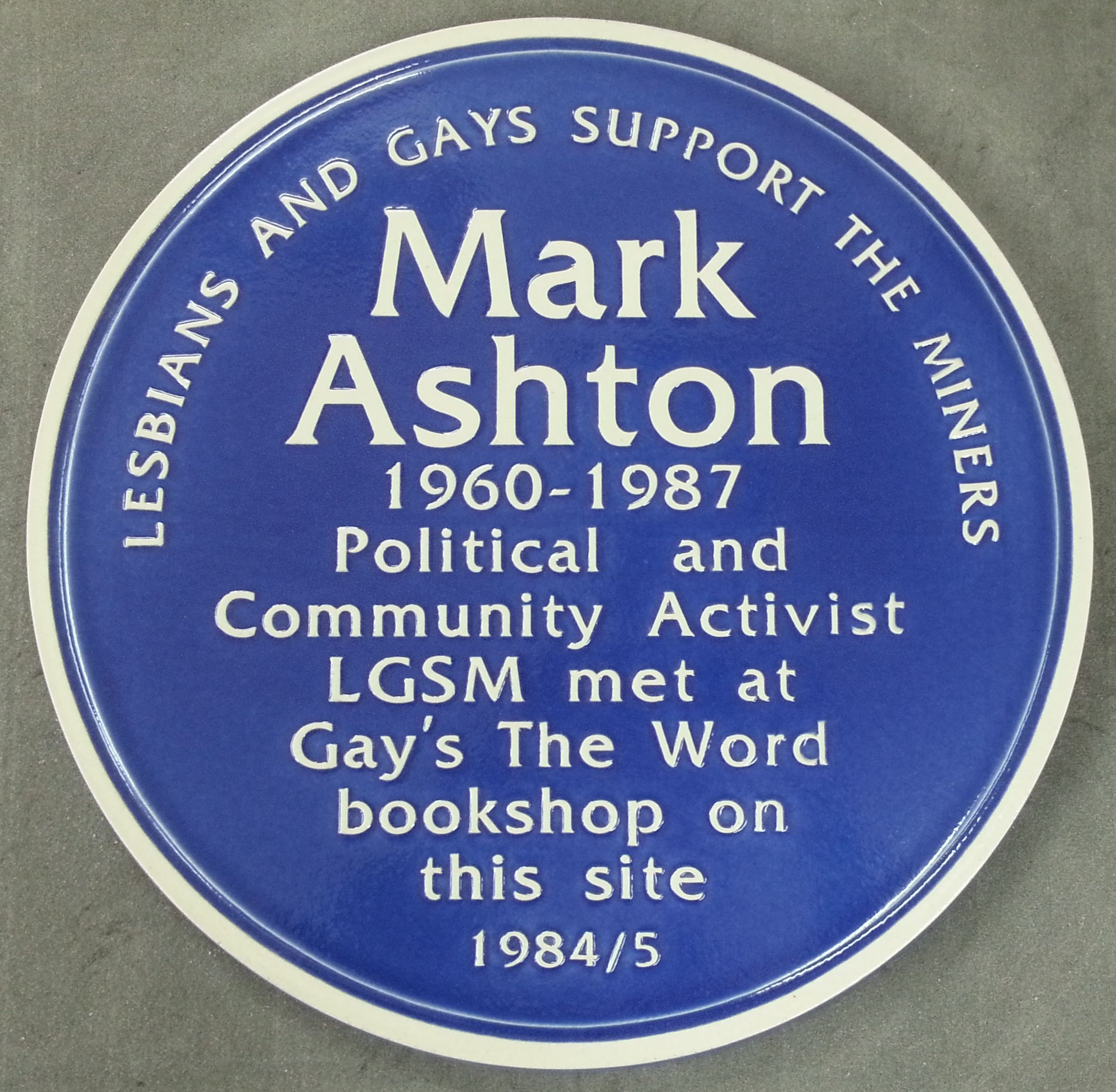
Blue plaque commemorating Mark Ashton

In his memory, the Mark Ashton Trust was created to raise money for individuals living with HIV, and as of 2007 it had raised £20,000.

Since 2008, the Terrence Higgins Trust has included the Mark Ashton Red Ribbon Fund, which had collected more than £45,000 as of 2025. The Trust also memorialised Ashton in May 2014 on a plaque at the entrance its London headquarters.

Ashton is remembered on a panel on the NAMES Project AIDS Memorial Quilt. In 2017, on what would have been Ashton's 57th birthday, a blue plaque was unveiled in his honour above the Gay's The Word bookshop in Marchmont Street, London, the site where LGSM met and held meetings during the miners' strike.

The ballad "For a Friend" in the album Red from synth-pop duo The Communards was written in his memory. Mark Hooper of The Rough Guide to Rock wrote that the recording may have been Jimmy Somerville's "most impassioned moment". Ashton was a friend of both Somerville and Richard Coles. "For a Friend" reached number 28 on the British charts.

The Constantine Giannaris film Jean Genet Is Dead (1989) was dedicated to his memory.

The LGSM's activities were dramatised in Pride, a film released in September 2014 featuring Ben Schnetzer as Ashton. Ashton's role in the Lesbians and Gays Support the Miners group was recalled in a series of interviews with some of its other members prior to the film's release. However, Ashton's membership in the Young Communist League was not explicitly mentioned in the film (though especially visually alluded to), with Doward speculating it could be not to avoid alienating American audiences. Fellow communist activist and a close friend of Mark Ashton, Lorraine Douglas, accused the film "glossed over Mark's politics and said nothing about the fact he subsequently became General Secretary of the YCL." Schnetzer was nominated for two British Independent Film Awards for his performance. Following the film's release until 21 September, the Mark Ashton Trust received £10,000 in donations.

On 25 September 2018, the Council of Paris awarded the garden adjoining the Hôtel d'Angoulême Lamoignon the new name of Jardin de l'Hôtel-Lamoignon - Mark-Ashton (Hôtel-Lamoignon - Mark Ashton Garden), in his memory.

On 2 June 2021, the Causeway Coast and Glens Borough Council approved the erection of a memorial blue plaque in his hometown of Portrush.

On 28 August 2022, a tree was planted in Ashton's memory at St. Columb's Park, Derry, as part of the 2022 Foyle Pride events. The planting ceremony was attended by his former LGSM colleague Mike Jackson and by civil rights activist Bernadette McAliskey.

On 5 August 2023, Mark Ashton's hometown, Portrush, held its inaugural Pride rally in honour of him.

== See also ==
- Claudia Jones

== Bibliography ==
- Birch, Chris (April 1994). "Mark Ashton – Panel No: 69". AIDSquilt.org.uk. Archived from the original on 10 February 2012.
- Birch, Chris (28 January 2007). "Mark Ashton". Gone Too Soon. All Points North. Archived from the original on 10 October 2017.
- Birch, Chris (2010). My Life: The Caribbean, Communism, Budapest 1956, journalism, HIV/Aids, London Lighthouse, Diana's funeral, Westminster Abbey, Chelsea and Westminster Hospital and much more. St Christopher Press. ISBN 978-0-9545721-1-2.
- Birch, Chris (2014). "The Mark Ashton Red Ribbon Fund". Red Ribbon Fund Newsletter (5). Terrence Higgins Trust.
- Birch, Chris (28 January 2016). "Memories of a class fighter". Morning Star.
- Coles, Richard (2014). Fathomless Riches: Or How I Went From Pop to Pulpit. Hachette UK. ISBN 978-0-297-87031-9.
- Doward, Jamie (21 September 2014). "The real-life triumphs of the gay communist behind hit movie Pride". The Observer. ISSN 0029-7712.
- Fischer, Mark (25 September 2014). "Moving and inspiring. Matthew Warchus (director) Pride general release". Weekly Worker.
- Frost, Peter (11 September 2014). "'Pits and Perverts:' The Legacy of Communist Mark Ashton". Morning Star.
- Frost, Peter (1 June 2016). "Honouring Irish LGBT heroes – a century ago and today". Morning Star.
- Hall–Carpenter Archives (1989). "Mark Ashton: Five Friends Remember". Walking After Midnight: Gay Men's Life Stories. Routledge. pp. 205–223. ISBN 978-0-415-02957-5. OL 15164674W.
- Hooper, Mark (2003). Buckley, Peter (ed.). The Rough Guide to Rock (3rd ed.). Rough Guides. ISBN 978-1-84353-105-0. OL 9016361W.
- Kellaway, Kate (31 August 2014). "When miners and gay activists united: the real story of the film Pride". The Guardian.
- Kelliher, Diarmaid (2014). "Solidarity and Sexuality: Lesbians and Gays Support the Miners 1984–5" (PDF). History Workshop Journal. 77 (1). Oxford Journals: 240–262. doi:10.1093/hwj/dbt012.
- Kutner, Jon (28 October 2012). "For A Friend (Communards)".
- Leeworthy, Daryl (2018). "Ashton, Mark Christian". Oxford Dictionary of National Biography. doi:10.1093/odnb/9780198614128.013.111326.
- Massillon, Julien (18 February 2015). "L'émotion de Jimmy Somerville: "Le héros de "Pride" était mon meilleur ami"". Yagg (in French). Archived from the original on 6 November 2019.
- Murray, Raymond (1998). Images in the Dark: An Encyclopedia of Gay and Lesbian Film and Video. Titan Books. ISBN 978-1-84023-033-8. OL 647635W.
- Robinson, Lucy (2007). Gay men and the left in post-war Britain: how the personal got political. Manchester: Manchester University Press. ISBN 978-0-7190-7434-9. OL 21837097M.
- Taylor, David G; Keay, Jon (June 2006). "Mark Ashton remembered". Positive Nation. Archived from the original on 7 October 2008.
- Wallace, Bruce (20 March 1987). "Obituary – Mark Ashton". The Leninist.
- Warwick, Neil; Kutner, Jon; Brown, Tony (2004). The Complete Book of the British charts: Singles & Albums. Omnibus Press. ISBN 978-1-84449-058-5. OL 8955386M.
- Wilson, Colin (21 September 2014). "Dear Love of Comrades: The politics of Lesbians and Gays Support the Miners". rs21.
- "'Mark was a very popular guy – he knew everyone', says close friend". Coleraine Times. 10 September 2014. Archived from the original on 6 December 2014.

Party political offices
Preceded by Douglas Chalmers	General Secretary of the Young Communist League; 1985–1986	Succeeded by Post vacant
