= For a Friend =

Single by The Communards

from the album Red
- B-side: "Victims (Live)" (7")
- Released: 8 February 1988 (UK)
- Recorded: 1987
- Length: 4:39 (CD single)
- Label: London Records (UK) / Metronome (Germany)
- Songwriters: Richard Coles, Jimmy Somerville
- Producer: Stephen Hague

The Communards singles chronology
"Never Can Say Goodbye" (1987)	"For a Friend" (1988)	"There's More to Love" (1988)

"For a Friend" is a song by British synth-pop duo The Communards taken from their 1987 album Red.

The song is an emotional ballad and was written in the memory of Mark Ashton, a friend of Jimmy Somerville and Richard Coles. Mark Hooper of The Rough Guide to Rock writes that this cut may be Somerville's "most impassioned moment". "For a Friend" reached number 28 on the British charts.

The song features an unusual rhythmic device. Although the song is in 4/4, a single beat is skipped at the end of each verse, creating a 3/4 bar just before each chorus.

== In media ==
The official music video for the song was directed by Andy Morahan. In 2014, the song was featured on the soundtrack to the film Pride. It was also one of the songs played at Burberry’s February 2018 show, presented on 17 February at the Dimco Buildings in West London, marking Christopher Bailey’s final outing for the brand. It also features in the 6th (final) episode of "Murder before Evensong" (2025).

== Track and format listing ==
7" Vinyl - LON 166 (UK)
No.	Title	Length
1.	"For a Friend"	4:35
2.	"Victims (Live)"	5:08

For a Friend 12" Vinyl - London LONX 166 (UK)
No.	Title	Length
1.	"For a Friend"
2.	"Victims (Live)"
3.	"Don't Leave Me This Way (Live)"
4.	"Heavens Above"

For a Friend 12" Vinyl - London LONY 166 (UK)
No.	Title	Length
1.	"For a Friend (Remix)"
2.	"You Are My World (Live)"
3.	"So Cold The Night (Live)"
4.	"Victims (Live)"

For a Friend 12" Vinyl Promo - London LOXDJ 166 (UK)
No.	Title	Length
1.	"For a Friend"
2.	"Megamix"
3.	"Never Can Say Goodbye"
4.	"Don't Leave Me This Way"
5.	"Disenchanted"
6.	"You Are My World"
7.	"Heaven Above"
8.	"You Are My World"

== Chart performance ==
=== Weekly charts ===
Chart	Peak position
Belgium (Ultratop Flanders)	29
Ireland (IRMA)	12
UK Singles (Official Charts)	28
West Germany (GfK)	35
