= Richard Cant =

English actor (born 1964)

- Born: Richard Cant; 1964 (age 61–62); Dartford, Kent
- Occupation: Actor
- Years active: 1996-present
- Partner: Richard Coles
- Father: Brian Cant

Richard Cant (born 1964) is a British actor. He is the son of actor and children's television presenter Brian Cant, and partner of Richard Coles, the former Communards musician and Anglican priest.

== Career ==
Cant appeared twice on the long-running murder mystery series Midsomer Murders, appearing in the 1997 pilot episode The Killings at Badger's Drift as undertaker Dennis Rainbird, and then again as Dennis Rainbird's cousin, Alistair Gooding, in the 2006 story Dead Letters. In the second story, he appeared alongside Jason Hughes, who played Detective Sergeant Ben Jones. Cant had previously appeared with Jason Hughes in an episode of the BBC 2 TV series This Life, where he played Phil, a friend of Hughes's character, Warren.

Other television and film appearances include "Stan and Ollie", "Mary, Queen of Scots", 'The Crown", "It's a Sin", The Way We Live Now, Bleak House, Gimme Gimme Gimme, and Gunpowder Treason and Plot. In 2007 he appeared in an episode of Doctor Who, "Blink".

He has worked on stage for The National Theatre, RSC, Royal Court, Cheek by Jowl, and Sheffield Crucible.

He appeared as Friedrich in War Horse at the New London Theatre.

In 2023, he starred as Merle Miller, the iconoclastic gay writer in the East End play, What It Means, at Wilton's Music Hall, London. The Guardian gave his performance 4 out of 5 stars, lauding him: "Richard Cant is superb as Merle Miller who takes a stand against homophobia in this clever retelling of his landmark essay." Time Out wrote, "Richard Cant gives an electric performance in this (largely) one-person play, based on real events, which makes its debut at Wilton's Music Hall."

In Spring 2024, he toured in a production of As You Like It to Romania. In Fall 2024, Cant performed as Edward Jenner in Pins and Needles at the Kiln Theatre.

== Personal life ==
Cant was born in Dartford, Kent in 1964. In June 2023, Richard Coles, the former Communards musician and Anglican priest, said he was in a relationship with Cant.

== Selected television work ==
- This Life (1996)
- Midsomer Murders (1997) & (2006)
- Gimme Gimme Gimme (1999)
- Lawless Heart (2001)
- The Way We Live Now (2001)
- Shackleton (2002)
- Ian Fleming: Bondmaker (2005)
- Bleak House (2005)
- Sparkle (2007)
- Doctor Who (2007)
- The Bill (2008)
- Vexed (2010)
- Mapp & Lucia (2014)
- The Crown (2020)
- It's A Sin (2021)
- Mary, Queen Of Scots (2018)
- Stan and Ollie (2019)

== Selected stage work ==
- As You Like It / Cymbeline/ Troilus and Cressida (Cheek by Jowl)
- War Horse (2012/13, NT at New London Theatre)
- Salome (Headlong)
- The Country Wife (Sheffield Crucible)
- Orlando (West End)
- Handbagged/ Wife (Kiln)
- The Vortex (Chichester)
- Henry The Sixth / Maydays / Hamlet (RSC)
- Normal Heart/ Mr Gum And The Dancing Bear (NT)
- Medea (Almeida)
- The Trial (Young Vic)
- After Edward/ Edward The Second (Globe)
- What It Means (Wilton's)
- The Importance of Bring Earnest (National Theatre)2025
