= Never Can Say Goodbye =

1971 single by The Jackson 5

Single by the Jackson 5

from the album Maybe Tomorrow
- B-side: "She's Good"
- Released: March 16, 1971
- Recorded: June 1970
- Studio: Hitsville U.S.A. (Hollywood, California)
- Genre: R&B; pop
- Length: 2:58
- Label: Motown
- Songwriter: Clifton Davis
- Producer: Hal Davis

The Jackson 5 singles chronology
"Mama's Pearl" (1971)	"Never Can Say Goodbye" (1971)	"Maybe Tomorrow" (1971)

Alternative release(s)
- Solid centre variant of the UK single

"Never Can Say Goodbye" is a song by American group the Jackson 5 from their fifth studio album, Maybe Tomorrow (1971). It was released on March 16, 1971, by Motown as the album's first single.

The song was written by Clifton Davis and produced by Hal Davis. The song was originally written and intended for the Supremes; however, Motown decided it would be better for the Jackson 5. It has been covered numerous times, most notably in 1974 by Gloria Gaynor and in 1987 by British synth-pop duo the Communards.

== Background ==
Recorded in June 1970 and released as a single in March 1971, the song features a young Michael Jackson singing a serious song about love, with accompaniment from his brothers. Although such a record was unusual for a teenage group, "Never Can Say Goodbye" was a number-two hit for three consecutive weeks on the Billboard Pop Singles chart, stuck behind Three Dog Night's "Joy to the World" (May 8–22, 1971), and a number-one hit on the Billboard Hot R&B/Hip-Hop Songs chart in the United States. In the United Kingdom, it reached number 33 on the UK Singles Chart. The song sold 1.2 million copies in the first week of its release with more than 2 million copies sold in the United States by the end of the year.

== Live performances ==
Notable televised performances of the song by the Jackson 5 (and their newer incarnation, the Jacksons) include:

- The Flip Wilson Show, November 4, 1971 – this recording appears on the 2009 Jackson 5 CD I Want You Back! Unreleased Masters
- One More Time (Jackson 5 TV special), January 10, 1974
- The Tonight Show Starring Johnny Carson, April 4, 1974
- Cher, March 16, 1975
- The Jacksons, July 7, 1976
- Motown 25: Yesterday, Today, Forever, May 16, 1983

In addition, the song appeared on the animated TV show The Jackson 5ive in the episode "A Rare Pearl", which aired on January 15, 1972.

This version appears in the 1994 film Crooklyn and on the second volume of its soundtrack album.

== Charts ==
=== Weekly charts ===
Chart (1971)	Peak position
Australia (Kent Music Report)	77
Canada Top Singles (RPM)	14
UK Singles (Official Charts)	33
US Billboard Hot 100	2
US R&B (Billboard)	1
US Cash Box Top 100	1

Chart (2026)	Peak position
Netherlands (Single Tip)	26

=== Year-end charts ===
Chart (1971)	Rank
US Billboard Hot 100	40
US R&B/Soul (Billboard)	9
US Cash Box Top 100	11

== Isaac Hayes version ==
"Never Can Say Goodbye"

Single by Isaac Hayes

from the album Black Moses
- B-side: "I Can't Help It (If I'm Still in Love with You)"
- Released: April 1971
- Genre: Soul
- Length: 5:07 (original album version); 3:32 (7-inch single version)
- Label: Enterprise
- Songwriter: Clifton Davis
- Producer: Isaac Hayes

Isaac Hayes singles chronology
"Ike's Mood I" (1971)	"Never Can Say Goodbye" (1971)	"Theme from Shaft" (1971)

Isaac Hayes first recorded the song for his 1971 album Black Moses. Released as a single, this version reached number five on the Billboard R&B chart, number 19 on the Easy Listening chart, and number 22 on the Hot 100. Hayes re-recorded the tune for the soundtrack of the 2008 film Soul Men, in which he appears alongside Samuel L. Jackson and Bernie Mac. The film's producers dedicated the 2008 version to Mac and Hayes, who both died before the project was released.

== Gloria Gaynor version ==
"Never Can Say Goodbye"
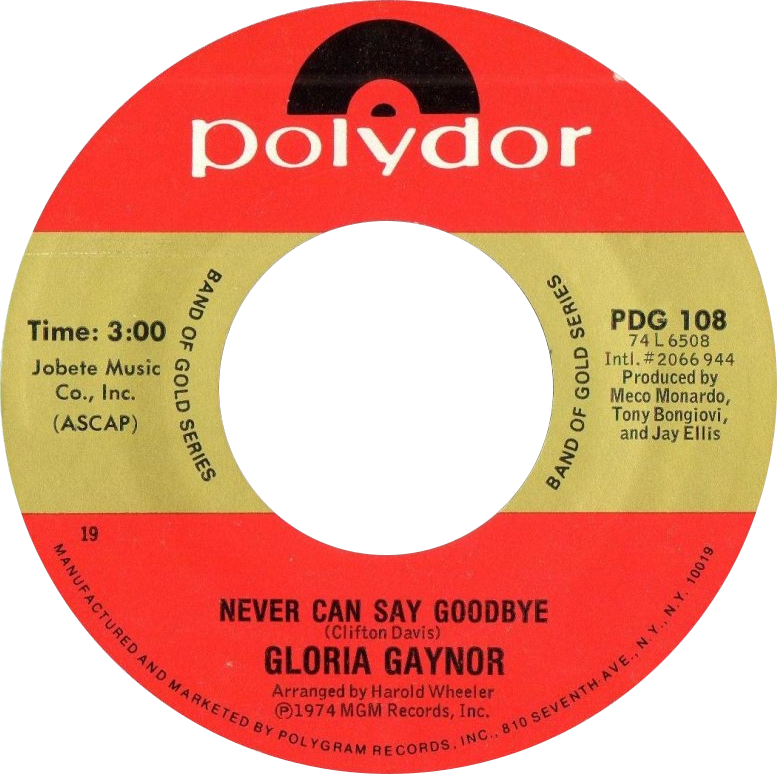
- US single reissue

Single by Gloria Gaynor

from the album Never Can Say Goodbye
- B-side: "We Just Can't Make It"
- Released: October 27, 1974
- Studio: Mediasound (New York City)
- Genre: Disco
- Length: 6:19 (original album version); 2:58 (7-inch single version)
- Label: MGM
- Songwriter: Clifton Davis
- Producers: Jay Ellis; Meco Monardo; Tony Bongiovi

Gloria Gaynor singles chronology
"Honey Bee" (1974)	"Never Can Say Goodbye" (1974)	"Reach Out, I'll Be There" (1975)

A major version by Gloria Gaynor, re-imagined as a disco record in 1974, was a number-nine hit on the U.S. Pop Singles chart and went to number 34 on the Soul Singles chart. The Gloria Gaynor version became one of the defining recordings of the disco era. Indeed, her version peaked at number two in the United Kingdom during January 1975, and number three in Canada, surpassing the Jackson Five's original recording in those nations.

Gaynor's cover, released on MGM records, was produced by the Disco Corporation of America, a production company newly formed by Meco Monardo and Tony Bongiovi to which Gaynor was signed. Also working on this production were Jay Ellis and Harold Wheeler.

Gaynor's cover has the distinction of occupying the number-one spot on the first Dance/Disco chart to appear in Billboard magazine. Never Can Say Goodbye was also the title of Gaynor's debut album on which the single appeared.

Gaynor has re-recorded the song on more than one occasion, in increasingly fast tempos, and subsequent remixes have hit the dance charts.

Gaynor's version of the song was heard on the TV series Charmed ("That '70s Episode"), and is featured on the video game series Just Dance 2015.

=== Charts ===
==== Weekly charts ====
Chart (1974–1975)	Peak position
Australia (Kent Music Report)	3
Austria (Ö3 Austria Top 40)	19
Belgium (Ultratop 50 Flanders)	5
Belgium (Ultratop 50 Wallonia)	7
Canada Top Singles (RPM)	3
Canada Adult Contemporary (RPM)	7
Ireland (IRMA)	3
Netherlands (Single Top 100)	6
South Africa (Springbok Radio)	8
Spain	3
UK Singles (Official Charts)	2
US Billboard Hot 100	9
US Adult Contemporary (Billboard)	11
US Dance/Disco (Billboard)	1
US R&B (Billboard)	34
US Cash Box Top 100	8
West Germany (GfK)	13

==== Year-end charts ====
Chart (1975)	Rank
Australia (Kent Music Report)	25
Canada (RPM)	50
Netherlands	73
US Billboard Hot 100	72
US Cash Box Top 100	79

== The Communards version ==
"Never Can Say Goodbye"
- Standard artwork

Single by The Communards

from the album Red
- B-side: "'77, The Great Escape"
- Released: October 26, 1987
- Genre: Hi-NRG
- Length: 4:53 (album version); 4:30 (7-inch version); 7:50 (12-inch version)
- Label: London
- Songwriter: Clifton Davis
- Producers: Stephen Hague (remix and additional production by Shep Pettibone)

The Communards singles chronology
"Tomorrow" (1987)	"Never Can Say Goodbye" (1987)	"For a Friend" (1988)

In 1987, British synth-pop duo the Communards had a hit with a hi-NRG cover of the song, which was featured on their second album, Red.

Their version reached number one in Spain and number two in Ireland, number four on the UK Singles Chart, number 51 on the U.S. Billboard Hot 100, and number two on the Billboard Hot Dance/Disco chart in the U.S. The group had reached number one on those charts covering another 1970s song, "Don't Leave Me This Way", in 1986. The cover was also a top 10 hit in several European countries and New Zealand.

A music video was produced for this version of the song, directed by Andy Morahan.

=== Critical reception ===
Richard Lowe of Smash Hits named "Never Say Goodbye" "Single of the Fortnight" and considered it "a work of such splendour and vigour".

=== Charts ===
==== Weekly charts ====
Chart (1987–1988)	Peak position
Australia (Australian Music Report)	13
Austria (Ö3 Austria Top 40)	6
Belgium (Ultratop 50 Flanders)	4
Europe (European Hot 100 Singles)	7
France (SNEP)	9
Ireland (IRMA)	2
Italy Airplay (Music & Media)	9
Netherlands (Dutch Top 40)	3
Netherlands (Single Top 100)	3
New Zealand (Recorded Music NZ)	6
South Africa (Springbok Radio)	15
Spain (AFYVE)	1
Switzerland (Schweizer Hitparade)	12
UK Singles (Official Charts)	4
US Billboard Hot 100	51
US Dance Club Songs (Billboard)	2
US Cash Box Top 100	58
West Germany (GfK)	6

==== Year-end charts ====
Chart (1987)	Position
Scotland Dance (Music Week)	20
UK Singles (OCC)	51

Chart (1988)	Position
Belgium (Ultratop 50 Flanders)	84
West Germany (Media Control)	62

== Television, film, and stage performances ==
- Nicole Kidman sings a few lines of the song in the animated film Happy Feet (2006).
- Will Ferrell sang the song on the first episode of The Tonight Show with Conan O'Brien.
- Jorge Núñez sang the song on the top 13 show on American Idol season 8.
- The song is used in the Broadway musical Disaster.
- A cover sung in Vietnamese by Khánh Hà plays in Gleaming the Cube.
- Loretta Devine sings a near 2 minute version of the song in an episode of Ally McBeal.
- The song is used in the video game Just Dance 2015.
- Clifton Davis sings the song in the soap opera Beyond the Gates.

=== Glee ===
Dianna Agron covered the song in 2012 during the eleventh episode of the third season of the American musical television series Glee, entitled "Michael". The performance received mostly positive reviews. Jen Chaney of The Washington Post gave the song a "B−", and said it "worked much better than every track that preceded it" because it adapted the song to the show "instead of trying to out-Jackson Jackson". Entertainment Weekly's Joseph Brannigan Lynch called it "a nice summation of her character's journey, but not vocally impressive enough to justify listening to outside of the episode" and gave it a "B". Crystal Bell of HuffPost TV described it as a "blah performance", but Kate Stanhope of TV Guide said it was "sweet and reflective". Erica Futterman of Rolling Stone wrote that it was "a tune well-suited for Quinn's sultry voice and the flipped meaning she gives the lyrics", and TVLine's Michael Slezak had a similar take: he gave it an "A" and called it a "remarkably lovely fit" for her voice.

== Samples and remixes ==
The Neptunes remixed "Never Can Say Goodbye" on the 2009 Michael Jackson remix album The Remix Suite.

In 2012, Wu-Tang Clan rapper Raekwon released his cover version of the song in which he raps over the instrumental.

== In popular culture ==
While appearing on The Hollywood Squares Clifton Davis sang a bit of the song a capella and then was asked who wrote the song. His answer was "I did" to which the contestant agreed (and was correct).

== Personnel ==
- Written by Clifton Davis.

"Never Can Say Goodbye" was originally copyrighted on June 10, 1970 [EU0000187089], and then was copyrighted again on December 21, 1970 [EP0000281027].

=== The Jackson 5 ===
- Lead vocals: Michael Jackson
- Background vocals: Jackie Jackson, Tito Jackson, Jermaine Jackson and Marlon Jackson
- Produced by Hal Davis
- Arranged by Gene Page
- Instrumentation by various Los Angeles studio musicians
  - Guitar: David T. Walker
  - Bass: Tony Newton
  - Drums: Earl Palmer
  - Keyboards: Joe Sample
  - Percussion: Jack Arnold

=== Gloria Gaynor ===
- Lead vocals: Gloria Gaynor
- Produced by the Disco Corporation of America (Meco Monardo, Tony Bongiovi, Jay Ellis producers; Harold Wheeler arranger)

== See also ==
- List of Billboard number-one disco singles of 1974
