= Theodora Tzimou =

Greek actress

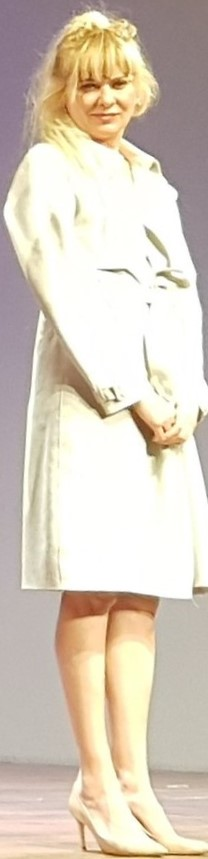
- Born: 20 March 1974 (age 52)
- Occupation: Actress
- Years active: 1994-present

Theodora Tzimou (Greek: Θεοδώρα Τζήμου; born 20 March 1974) is a Greek actress. She appeared in more than twenty films since 1994.

== Selected filmography ==
| Year | Title | Role | Notes |
|---|---|---|---|
| 2013 | The Eternal Return of Antonis Paraskevas | | |
| 2012 | The Daughter | | |
| 2011 | Man at Sea | | |
| 2011 | Unfair World | | |
| 2001 | One Day in August | | |
| 1998 | From the Edge of the City | | |
