= So Cold the Night =

1986 single by the Communards

Single by the Communards

from the album Communards
- B-side: "When the Walls Come Tumbling Down"
- Released: 17 November 1986
- Recorded: 1986
- Studio: Milo Studios, London
- Genre: Synth-pop; dance
- Length: 4:39 (single version); 5:45 (album version)
- Label: London
- Songwriter(s): Jimmy Somerville; Richard Coles
- Producer(s): Mike Thorne

The Communards singles chronology
"Don't Leave Me This Way" (1986)	"So Cold the Night" (1986)	"You Are My World '87" (1987)

"So Cold the Night" is a song by British synth-pop duo the Communards released in November 1986 as the final single from their debut album Communards. It was their second top-ten hit, peaking at number 8 on the UK Singles Chart.

== Release and reception ==
"So Cold the Night" was released with the B-side "When the Walls Come Tumbling Down", also written by the duo, and was dedicated to Nelson Mandela. The 12-inch single was released with the additional B-side "Never No More". A remix of "So Cold the Night" was released as a 12-inch single in December 1986. It was a double A-side single with "When the Walls Come Tumbling Down" and "The Multimix", a medley remix of "Don't Leave Me This Way", "So Cold the Night" and "Disenchanted".

Reviewing for Record Mirror, Jane Wilkes wrote "clandestine meetings and hi-NRG Balkan folk music engage for this Somerville/Coles composition. Their cover versions have always maintained an ambiguity, whereas their own songs place you right in the picture regarding their sexual/political stance".

== Track listing ==
7": London / LON 110

1. "So Cold the Night" – 4:39
2. "When the Walls Come Tumbling Down" – 4:20

7": London / LONDJ 110 (promo)

1. "So Cold the Night" – 3:45
2. "So Cold the Night" (Full Length) – 4:40

12": London / LONX 110

1. "So Cold the Night" – 9:12
2. "When the Walls Come Tumbling Down" – 4:22
3. "Never No More" – 2:58

12": London / LONXR 110

1. "So Cold the Night" – 8:34
2. "The Multimix" – 8:00
3. "When the Walls Come Tumbling Down" – 4:21

12": London / LONX 110 (promo)

1. "So Cold the Night" – 9:12
2. "So Cold the Night" (Instrumental) – 9:12

12": London / LDSX 235 (Canada)

1. "So Cold the Night" (Remixed Club Version) – 8:45
2. "So Cold the Night" (7" Version) – 3:45
3. "So Cold the Night" (Instrumental) – 9:45

Cassette: London / LONCS 110

1. "So Cold the Night"
2. "When the Walls Come Tumbling Down"
3. "Never No More"
4. "Don't Leave Me This Way" (Son of Gotham City)

== Charts ==
=== Weekly charts ===
Weekly chart performance for "So Cold the Night"
Chart (1986–1987)	Peak position
Australia (Kent Music Report)	90
Austria (Ö3 Austria Top 40)	13
Belgium (Ultratop 50 Flanders)	7
Europe (Hot 100 Singles)	13
France (SNEP)	17
Germany (GfK)	14
Ireland (IRMA)	4
Netherlands (Dutch Top 40)	11
Netherlands (Single Top 100)	8
New Zealand (Recorded Music NZ)	44
Spain (Promusicae)	4
Switzerland (Schweizer Hitparade)	10
UK Singles (OCC)	8

=== Year-end charts ===
1987 year-end chart performance for "So Cold the Night"
Chart (1987)	Position
Belgium (Ultratop 50 Flanders)	82
Europe (Hot 100 Singles)	57
France	77
Netherlands (Dutch Top 40)	99
Netherlands (Single Top 100)	91

=== Certifications and sales ===
In France, the single reportedly sold at least 150,000 copies.
