= Constantine Giannaris =

Greek film director, screenwriter and actor

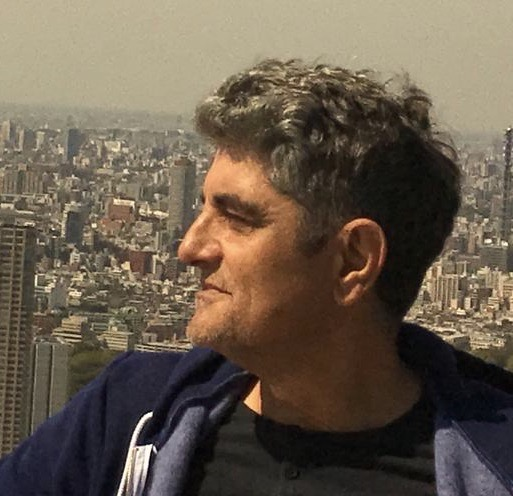
Constantine Giannaris against the backdrop of the Tokyo skyline in 2021

Constantine Giannaris, also Constantinos Giannaris (Greek: Κωνσταντίνος Γιάνναρης; born 1959), is a Greek film director, photographer, actor and author. He is best known for his award-winning feature films From the Edge of the City, Hostage, and his early queer work in Britain.

== Personal Life ==
Giannaris was born in Sydney, Australia to Greek parents. He returned to Greece with his family at the age of 14. He later moved to London, where he studied history and economics and lived for 24 years. During his time in the United Kingdom, he became involved in the gay rights movement and developed his career as a filmmaker before eventually returning to Greece.

He is openly gay and realized his sexuality at 13.

== Filmography ==
Year	English title	Greek title (Original title)	Language	Country	Notes
1983	Framed Youth: The Revenge of the Teenage Perverts		English	UK	participant; short film, 45 minutes
1989	Jean Genet Is Dead		English	UK/Greece	director; writer; short film, 40 minutes, dedicated to Mark Ashton
1990	Silences		English	UK/Greece	director; writer; short film, 10 minutes
1990	Trojans	Τρώες	English	UK/Greece	director; writer; short film, 33 minutes 1990 Teddy Award for Best Short Film
1991	North of Vortex		English	UK/Greece	director, short film, 58 minutes
1991	Caught Looking		English	UK	director; short film, 35 minutes 1992 Teddy Award for Best Short Film
1992	The Battle of Tuntenhaus, Part 2		English/German	UK	cameraperson, interviewer
1994	A Place in the Sun	Μια Θέση στον Ήλιο (Mia thesi ston ilio)	Greek	UK/Greece	director; writer; 45 minutes
1995	3 Steps to Heaven		English	UK	director; writer; actor; TV film
1998	From the Edge of the City	Από την άκρη της πόλης (Apo tin akri tis polis)	Greek/Russian	Greece	director; writer; actor
2001	One Day in August	Δεκαπενταύγουστος (Dekapentavgoustos)	Greek	Greece	director; writer
2004	Visions of Europe: segment Room for All			European Union	director; writer; short film, 5 minutes
2005	Hostage	Ομηρος (Omiros)	Greek/Albanian	Greece/Turkey	director; writer
2009	Gender Pop		Greek	Greece	director; writer; documentary short, 40 minutes
2011	Man at Sea	Άνθρωπος στη Θάλασσα (Anthropos sti thalassa)	Greek	Greece	director; writer
