= Red (The Communards album) =

1987 studio album by The Communards

Studio album by the Communards
- Released: 5 October 1987
- Recorded: June–August 1987
- Studio: Advision (London)
- Genres: Synth-pop; Eurodance
- Length: 45:11
- Label: London
- Producers: Stephen Hague; the Communards

The Communards chronology
| Communards (1986) | Red (1987) | Heaven (1994) |

Singles from Communards
- 1. "Tomorrow" Released: August 1987; 2. "Never Can Say Goodbye" Released: October 1987; 3. "For a Friend" Released: February 1988; 4. "There's More to Love" Released: May 1988

Red is the second and final studio album by British synth-pop duo the Communards, released on 5 October 1987 by London Records in the United Kingdom and MCA Records in the United States. It reached number 4 on the UK Albums Chart and number 93 on the US Billboard 200 and has been certified platinum in the UK. Red features the singles "Never Can Say Goodbye", "Tomorrow", "There's More to Love Than Boy Meets Girl" and "For a Friend".

== Notable songs ==
=== "Never Can Say Goodbye" ===
The Clifton Davis-penned song was originally performed by the Jackson 5, but this rendition is similar to Gloria Gaynor's disco version. Jimmy Somerville's "straight ahead" vocals are a strength of the song, with Andy Kellman of AllMusic crediting him with producing a recording that "stands apart" from other versions. The single proved successful on both sides of the Atlantic; reaching number 4 in the UK and number 51 in the US, while being certified silver in the UK. The track was used in the Doctor Who episode "Father's Day".

=== "For a Friend" ===
The last cut on the original vinyl side one is an emotional ballad. It was written in memory of Mark Ashton, a friend of Somerville and Richard Coles who died of HIV/AIDS. Mark Hooper of The Rough Guide to Rock writes that this cut may be Somerville's "most impassioned moment". It was among the first pop songs to address AIDS. "For a Friend" reached number 28 on the British charts. It was featured in the soundtrack of the 2014 film Pride. It was also one of the songs played at Burberry’s February 2018 show, marking Christopher Bailey’s final outing for the brand.

== Artwork and title ==
The album cover is white with a grey five-pointed star containing two faces in profile (the group's logo). Directly above the star is the band's name in plain all capital letters. Above the band's name in red flowing script is the album title 'Red'. The title is a nod to the duo's socialist leanings at the time. The US issue features the cover in red.

== Reception ==
Professional ratings
Review scores
| Source | Rating |
|---|---|
| AllMusic | 4.5/5 stars |
| Record Mirror | 3/5 stars |
| Smash Hits | 8/10 |

Opinions vary as to where this album stands next to its predecessor, Communards. Andy Kellman of AllMusic's retrospective review feels it "tops their respectable debut in nearly every aspect" and that the singles "Tomorrow" and "There's More to Love Than Boy Meets Girl" are "stronger than anything on the debut". On the other hand, Kate Walter of Spin said it is "weaker than [their] sizzling debut album". Balancing these opinions was Mark Hooper of The Rough Guide to Rock who wrote that the album is "every bit as accomplished as its predecessor".

Kellman's review praises the production work of Stephen Hague and calls the album "a defining Euro-dance record of the latter half of the '80s". Walter credits Cole's "rickety–tickety synthesizers" and "tingly keyboards" along with Somerville's "squeals" and "whoops" as strengths of the album but bemoans the lack of cohesion of the album's side two compared to its first half.

== Track listing ==
Written by Richard Coles and Jimmy Somerville, except where noted

=== LP ===
Side one
| No. | Title | Length |
|---|---|---|
| 1. | "Tomorrow" | 4:52 |
| 2. | "There's More to Love Than Boy Meets Girl" | 4:38 |
| 3. | "Matter of Opinion" | 4:27 |
| 4. | "Victims" | 4:32 |
| 5. | "For a Friend" | 5:03 |

Side two
| No. | Title | Length |
|---|---|---|
| 6. | "Never Can Say Goodbye" (Clifton Davis) | 4:53 |
| 7. | "Lovers and Friends" (Coles) | 4:16 |
| 8. | "Hold on Tight" | 4:49 |
| 9. | "If I Could Tell You" (W. H. Auden, Somerville) | 4:17 |
| 10. | "C Minor" | 5:10 |
| Total length: | | 45:11 |

=== CD ===
CD1
| No. | Title | Length |
|---|---|---|
| 1. | "Tomorrow" | 4:52 |
| 2. | "T.M.T.♥.T.B.M.G." | 4:38 |
| 3. | "Matter Of Opinion" | 4:27 |
| 4. | "Victims" | 4.32 |
| 5. | "For A Friend" | 5.03 |
| 6. | "Never Can Say Goodbye" | 4:53 |
| 7. | "Lovers And Friends" | 4:16 |
| 8. | "Hold On Tight" | 4:49 |
| 9. | "If I Could Tell You" | 4:17 |
| 10. | "C Minor" | 5:10 |
| Total length: | | 45:11 |

=== 2012 Re-issue ===
CD1 Bonus Tracks
| No. | Title | Length |
|---|---|---|
| 11. | "For A Friend (BBC Unplugged Live)" | 3:50 |
| 12. | "Never Can Say Goodbye (San Paulo Mix)" | 7:03 |
| 13. | "Romanze For Violin, Piano & Hedgehog" | 4:29 |
| 14. | "There's More To Love (Jalapeno Mix)" | 7:47 |
| 15. | "Tomorrow (Extended 12" Version)" | 7:15 |
| 16. | "Zing Went The Strings Of My Heart" | 2:48 |
| Total length: | | 78:23 |

CD2
| No. | Title | Length |
|---|---|---|
| 1. | "Never Can Say Goodbye (Shep Pettibone Extended Mix)" | 11:14 |
| 2. | "When The Boy In Your Heart Is The Boy In Your Arms" | 2:26 |
| 3. | "I Just Want To Let You Know" | 3:25 |
| 4. | "Scat" | 3:32 |
| 5. | "Piece Of Saxophone" | 3:28 |
| 6. | "Never Can Say Goodbye (San Paulo Dub Mix)" | 6:24 |
| 7. | "For A Friend (Remix)" | 5:02 |
| Total length: | | 35:31 113:54 |

Storm Paris
| No. | Title | Length |

Bonus Tracks
| No. | Title | Length |
|---|---|---|
| 16. | "Spanish Rap (El Amor No Es Solo Un Hombre Y Una Mujer)" | 1:08 |
| 17. | "Never Can Say Goodbye (Instrumental Mix)" | 5:48 |

=== 2022 Re-issue ===
CD1 Bonus Tracks
| No. | Title | Length |
|---|---|---|
| 11. | "I Just Want To Let You Know" | 3:25 |
| 12. | "Scat" | 3.29 |
| 13. | "'77 The Great Escape" | 2:17 |
| 14. | "I Do It All For You" | 5:07 |
| 15. | "Romanze For Violin, Piano And Hedgehog" | 4:26 |
| 16. | "Zing Went The Strings Of My Heart" | 2:45 |
| 17. | "When The Boy In Your Heart Is The Boy In Your Arms" | 2:24 |
| 18. | "Never Can Say Goodbye (Spanish Vocal)" | 4:50 |
| 19. | "Piece Of Saxophone" | 3:29 |
| Total length: | | 77:23 |

CD2
| No. | Title | Length |
|---|---|---|
| 1. | "Never Can Say Goodbye (The 2 Bears Remix)" | 9:59 |
| 2. | "There's More To Love (Jalapeño Mix)" | 7:47 |
| 3. | "Tomorrow (Overnight Mix)" | 5:27 |
| 4. | "For A Friend (Remix)" | 5:02 |
| 5. | "Never Can Say Goodbye (Shep Pettibone Extended Mix)" | 11:14 |
| 6. | "C Minor (Live)" | 3:36 |
| 7. | "Victims (Storm Paris)" | 5:16 |
| 8. | "Hold On Tight (Storm Paris)" | 3:48 |
| 9. | "There's More To Love (Percapella)" | 5:07 |
| 10. | "Tomorrow (Demo)" | 4:54 |
| 11. | "Never Can Say Goodbye (Rough Mix)" | 4:54 |
| 12. | "For A Friend (Rough Mix)" | 4:34 |
| 13. | "Hold On Tight (Demo)" | 4:40 |
| Total length: | | 76:18 153:41 |

== Personnel ==
=== The Communards ===
- Jimmy Somerville – lead vocals and backing vocals
- Richard Coles – synthesizers, piano and drum machine

=== Additional musicians ===
- Rob Fisher – synthesizer and sequencer
- Dave Renwick – bass
- Gary Barnacle – soprano saxophone
- Simon Clarke – alto saxophone and baritone saxophone
- Pandit Dinesh – percussions
- Sally Herbert – violin
- Judd Lander – harmonica
- Roddy Lorimer – trumpet
- June Miles-Kingston – drums and backing vocals
- Audrey Riley – cello
- Jocelyn Pook – viola
- Tim Sanders – tenor saxophone
- Steve Sidwell – trumpet
- Anne Stephenson – violin
- Annie Whitehead – trombone
- Jo Pretzel – synthesizers
- Zita Wadwa – additional vocals
- Caroline Buckley – backing vocals

== Charts ==
=== Weekly charts ===
Weekly chart performance for Red
| Chart (1987–1988) | Peak position |
|---|---|
| Australian Albums (Australian Music Report) | 97 |
| Austrian Albums (Ö3 Austria) | 15 |
| Dutch Albums (Album Top 100) | 32 |
| European Albums (Music & Media) | 10 |
| French Albums (IFOP) | 3 |
| German Albums (Offizielle Top 100) | 22 |
| Italian Albums (Musica e dischi) | 19 |
| New Zealand Albums (RMNZ) | 29 |
| Swiss Albums (Schweizer Hitparade) | 20 |
| UK Albums (Official Charts) | 4 |
| US Billboard 200 | 93 |

| Chart (2022) | Peak position |
|---|---|
| Scottish Albums (OCC) | 52 |

=== Year-end charts ===
Year-end chart performance for Red
| Chart (1987) | Position |
|---|---|
| UK Albums (Gallup) | 67 |
| West German Albums (Offizielle Top 100) | 60 |

== Certifications ==
Certifications for Red
| Region | Certification | Certified units/sales |
|---|---|---|
| France (SNEP) | 2× Gold | 200,000^{*} |
| Spain (Promusicae) | Platinum | 100,000^{^} |
| Switzerland (IFPI Switzerland) | Gold | 25,000^{^} |
| United Kingdom (BPI) | Platinum | 300,000^{^} |
^{*} Sales figures based on certification alone.^{^} Shipments figures based on certification alone.
