= One Day in August =

2001 film by Constantine Giannaris

- Directed by: Constantine Giannaris
- Starring: Eleni Kastani; Akilas Karazisis
- Release dates: 11 November 2001 (TIFF); 1 February 2002 (Greece)
- Running time: 106 minutes
- Country: Greece
- Language: Greek

One Day in August (Greek: Δεκαπενταύγουστος) is a 2001 Greek drama film directed by Constantine Giannaris.

== Cast ==
- Eleni Kastani - Morfoula
- Akilas Karazisis - Fanis
- Amalia Moutoussi - Katia
- Emilios Chilakis - Kostas
- Theodora Tzimou - Sandra
- Michalis Iatropoulos - Mihalis
