= Framed Youth: The Revenge of the Teenage Perverts =

- Directed by: Trill Burton, Jeff Cole, Rose Collis, Nicola Field, Toby Kettle, Pom Martin, Jimmy Somerville
- Produced by: Lesbian and Gay Youth Video Project
- Edited by: Philip Timmins
- Music by: Jimmy Somerville, Eurythmics, Soft Cell
- Distributed by: Frameline Distribution, Albany Video
- Release date: April 1983
- Running time: 45 minutes
- Country: United Kingdom
- Language: English

Framed Youth: The Revenge of the Teenage Perverts is a 1983 documentary film, produced by the London Lesbian and Gay Youth Video Project, in which gay and lesbian teenagers interview straight people on the streets of London about their views on homosexuality. The project involved a number of members of the London Gay Teenage Group. The film was broadcast on Channel 4 in December 1986.

== Full cast and crew ==
- Project coordinators: Andy Lipman, Philip Timmins
- Participants:
  - Mark Ashton
  - Trill Burton
  - Jeff Cole
  - Julian Cole
  - Richard Coles
  - Rose Collis
  - Maureen Donnelly
  - Nicola Field
  - Constantine (Connie) Giannaris
  - Toby Kettle
  - Joe Lavelle
  - Pom Martin
  - Carl Miller
  - Graham Pyper
  - Simon Shipman
  - Jimmy Somerville
  - Lil Trenchard
  - David Wiseman
  - Sara Blount
- Additional participants:
  - Chris Boot
  - Gill Hayward
  - Claire Hodson
  - Carl Johnson
  - Kim Miller
  - Femi Otitoju
  - Isaac Julien
  - Royce Ullah
- Production group from 1985 to 1986:
  - Claire Hodson
  - Carmelita Kadeena-Whyte
  - Dawn Thomas
- Graphics: Steve Pickard
- Editing:
  - Trill Burton
  - Nicola Field
  - Constantine (Connie) Giannaris
  - Toby Kettle
  - Pom Martin
  - Jimmy Somerville
- Fine cut: Philip Timmins
- TV editing: Phil Woodward
- Song "Screaming": Jimmy Somerville
- Technicians: Ivan Burgess, Andy Ironside
- Audio post-production: David Stevens
- Picture and music research: Clare Beavan

== Awards ==
- 1984: Grierson Award for Best Documentary.

== Bibliography ==
- Clews, Colin (28 March 2012). "1982. Screaming Teenage Perverts". Gay in the 80s.
- McGahan, Catherine (4 April 2014). "The Grierson Awards 40 years on". British Film Institute.
- Pullen, Christopher (2014). Queer Youth and Media Cultures. Palgrave Macmillan. ISBN 978-1-137-38355-6.
- Shariatmadari, David (22 March 2013). "The language of LGBT love". The Guardian.
- Williams, Clifford (2021). "Courage to Be: Organised Gay Youth in England 1967-90". The Book Guild Ltd. ISBN 9781913913632.
