= Man at Sea =

2011 film

- Directed by: Constantine Giannaris
- Written by: Constantine Giannaris
- Produced by: Alexander Emmert
- Starring: Antonis Karistinos
- Cinematography: Yorgos Argiroiliopoulos
- Release date: 10 October 2011
- Running time: 92 minutes
- Country: Greece
- Language: Greek

Man at Sea (Greek: Άνθρωπος στη Θάλασσα, translit. Anthropos sti thalassa) is a 2011 Greek drama film directed by Constantine Giannaris.

== Plot ==
Alex, the captain of a Greek oil tanker, is still dealing with the death of his son four years ago. While his ship the "Sea Voyager" is in the Mediterranean Sea, Captain Alex comes across a boat filled with adolescent refugees from Iran, Iraq, and Afghanistan. He takes pity on the refugees and allows them on his ship. He plans to drop the refugees off at a port, but local authorities refuse to take them, forcing the refugees to stay on the boat. Their residence angers the ship's owners, and gradually the "Sea Voyager" becomes a claustrophobic war zone between the refugees and the ship's owners.

== Cast ==
- Antonis Karistinos as Alex
- Theodora Tzimou as Katia
- Konstadinos Avarikiotis as Andreas
- Konstadinos Siradakis as Pantelis
- Stathis Papadopoulos as Yuri
- Thanasis Tatavlalis as Petros
- Nikos Tsourakis as Samir
- Stathis Apostolou as Johnny
- Chalil Ali Zada as Rafik
- Rahim Rahimi as Kamal

== Reception ==
"Man at Sea" was featured in the Panorama section of the 2011 Berlin Film Festival.

It was observed, "If Man at Sea isn’t the director’s best work – although it certainly is his most ambitious – it’s because of his inability to orchestrate the internal rhythms of the conflict." Movies Ltd. listed the diverse sociological issues that the movie deals with: "Illegal immigration, family loss, financial crisis, illegality" (Greek: Λαθρομετανάστευση, οικογενειακή απώλεια, οικονομική κρίση, παρανομία). Boyd van Hoeij wrote, "Giannaris’s latest plays more like 'Around the World in 80 Plot Twists.'"
