= Jimmy Somerville =

Scottish pop singer (born 1961)

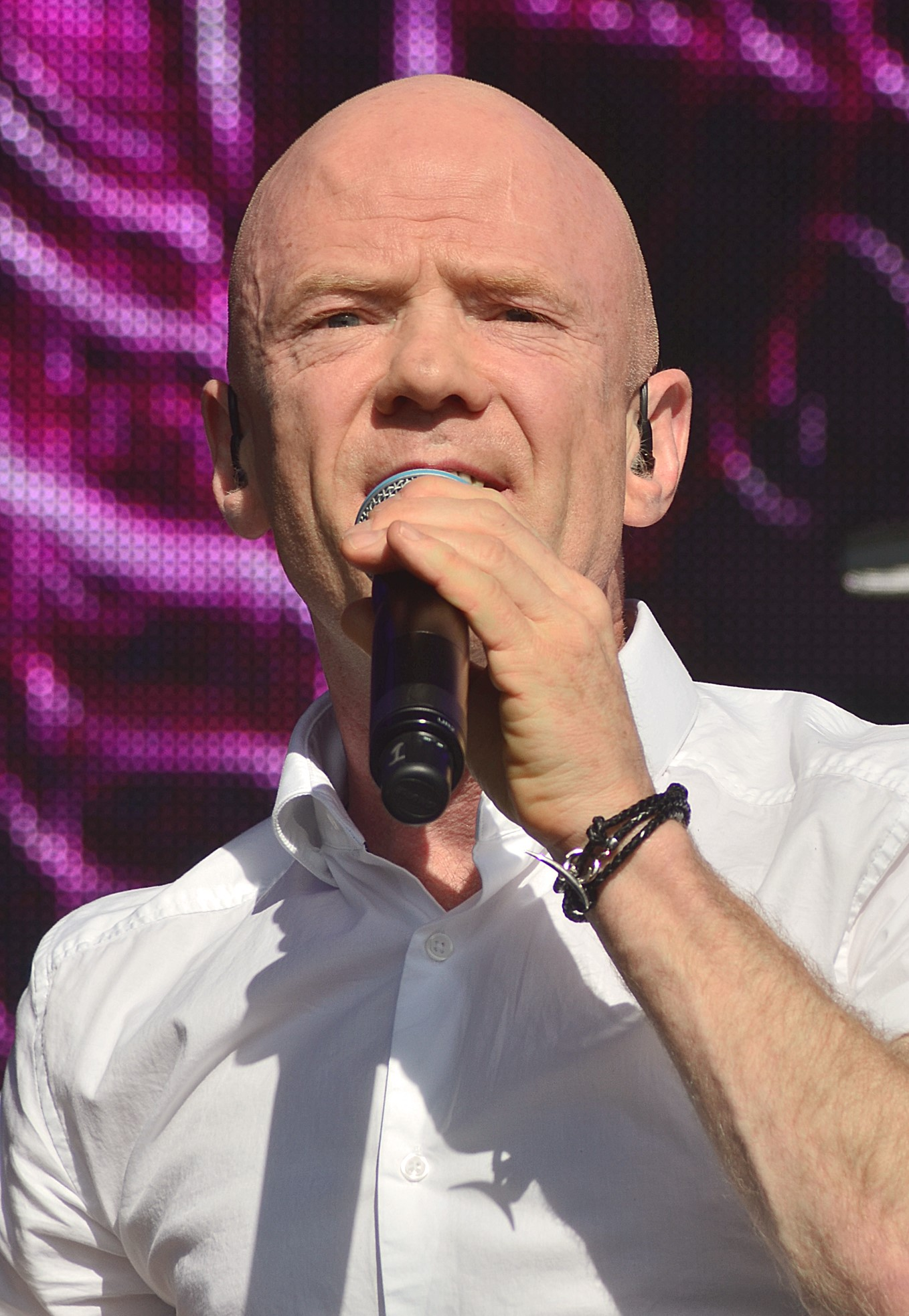
- Somerville performing at Let's Rock, 2015
- Born: James William Somerville; 22 June 1961 (age 65); Glasgow, Scotland
- Occupations: Singer; songwriter; record producer
- Years active: 1983–present
- Works: Full discography
- Musical career
- Origin: Ruchill, Glasgow, Scotland
- Genres: Pop; electronic; dance
- Instruments: Vocals
- Labels: London; SPV; Gut; Jinx/BMG; Membran/Strike Force Entertainment
- Formerly of: Bronski Beat; The Communards
- Website: jimmysomerville.co.uk

James William Somerville (born 22 June 1961) is a Scottish singer. He rose to prominence in the 1980s as a member of the synth-pop groups Bronski Beat and the Communards. With the former, Somerville achieved commercial success worldwide with the 1984 single "Smalltown Boy", which peaked at number three on the UK Singles Chart.

Bronski Beat's debut album The Age of Consent (1984) was the only release Somerville contributed to as lead vocalist before leaving the band in 1985 to join the Communards. With Somerville on lead vocals, the Communards released their self-titled debut album in 1986, spawning the internationally successful single "Don't Leave Me This Way" which became the best-selling single of 1986 in the United Kingdom. Further success came with single "So Cold the Night" and their second studio album Red (1987) before disbanding in 1988; Somerville then began a solo career.

== Early life ==
Born on 22 June 1961, James William Somerville grew up in Ruchill, a neighbourhood of northern Glasgow. In 1980, he moved to London, where he lived in squats. He immersed himself in gay culture, and attended the London Gay Teenage Group.

== Career ==
=== Bronski Beat (1983–1985) ===
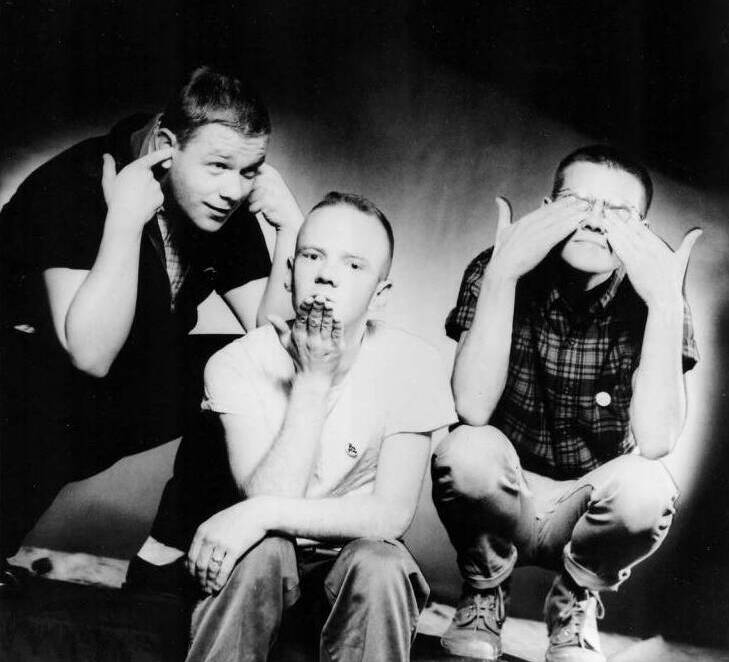
Somerville (centre) with Bronski Beat (1985)

In 1983, Somerville co-founded the synth-pop group Bronski Beat, which had several hits in the British charts. Their biggest hit was "Smalltown Boy", which peaked at number three on the UK Singles Chart. In the music video Somerville plays the song's titular character, who leaves his hostile hometown for the friendlier city, reflecting Somerville's own experiences when he moved to London.

Bronski Beat signed a recording contract with London Records in 1984 after doing only nine live gigs. The band's debut single, "Smalltown Boy", about a gay teenager leaving his family and fleeing his home town, was a hit, peaking at No 3 in the UK Singles Chart, and topping charts in Belgium and the Netherlands. The single was accompanied by a promotional video directed by Bernard Rose, showing Somerville trying to befriend an attractive diver at a swimming pool, then being attacked by the diver's homophobic associates, being returned to his family by the police and having to leave home. (The police officer was played by Colin Bell, then the marketing manager of London Records.) "Smalltown Boy" reached 48 in the U.S. chart and peaked at 8 in Australia.

The follow-up single, "Why?", adopted a hi-NRG sound and was more lyrically focused on anti-gay prejudice. It also achieved Top 10 status in the UK, reaching 6, and was another Top 10 hit for the band in Australia, Switzerland, Germany, France and the Netherlands. At the end of 1984, the trio released an album titled The Age of Consent. The inner sleeve listed the varying ages of consent for consensual gay sex in different nations around the world. At the time, the age of consent for sexual acts between men in the UK was 21 compared with 16 for heterosexual acts, with several other countries having more liberal laws on gay sex. The album peaked at 4 in the UK Albums Chart, 36 in the U.S., and 12 in Australia.

=== The Communards and solo (1985–1991) ===
Somerville left Bronski Beat in 1985 and formed The Communards with classically-trained pianist Richard Coles, who later became a Church of England vicar and broadcaster. They had several hits, including a cover version of Harold Melvin & the Blue Notes' "Don't Leave Me This Way", which spent four weeks at No. 1 in the UK charts and became the biggest-selling single of 1986 in the UK. He also sang backing vocals on Fine Young Cannibals' version of "Suspicious Minds", which was a UK Top 10 hit.

The Communards split in 1988; Somerville began a solo career the following year. He released his debut solo album Read My Lips in November 1989, which contained three UK Top 30 hits, including a hit cover of Sylvester's disco song "You Make Me Feel (Mighty Real)" and a cover of "Comment te dire adieu?", a duet with June Miles-Kingston, which reached number 14 in the UK Singles chart. He also sang on the second Band Aid project at the end of 1989.

In November 1990, Somerville's greatest-hits album The Singles Collection 1984/1990 (which featured his hits with Bronski Beat and The Communards in addition to his own material) was released; it reached number 4 on the UK Album Chart. It included a reggae cover of the Bee Gees' hit song "To Love Somebody", which also reached the UK Top 10. Also in 1990, Somerville contributed the song "From This Moment On" to the Cole Porter tribute album Red Hot + Blue produced by the Red Hot Organization, the proceeds from which benefited AIDS research.

=== Dare to Love and other works (1991–1997) ===
"I don't think it's fair to tell your audience that you're gay, but that you're not going to acknowledge it in your primary form of creative expression. It's an unfortunate manipulation of honesty that collects gay dollars without an even exchange. But my intention is not to help people live in oblivion. It is to be honest. And that is far more important than gold-selling records"

— Somerville interviewed by Billboard weeks before launching Dare to Love.

In 1991, Somerville provided backing vocals to a track called "Why Aren't You in Love With Me?" from the album Ripe by Communards offshoot band Banderas. The Banderas duo, Caroline Buckley and Sally Herbert, had previously been part of Somerville's backing band. After this, he disappeared from the limelight for several years. He returned in 1995 with the album Dare to Love, which included "Heartbeat" (a UK Top 30 hit and a No. 1 hit on the US dance chart), "Hurt So Good" and "By Your Side", though commercial success was now beginning to elude him and his contract with London Records to which he had been signed for over a decade came to an end.

=== Manage the Damage and recent activity (1997–present) ===
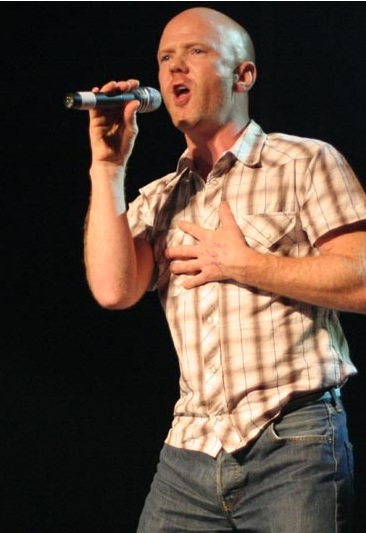
Somerville at the Skarpa club in Warsaw, Poland, June 2006

A new single, "Dark Sky", was released in 1997 and peaked at No. 66 in the UK. In the same year he provided vocals on "The Number One Song in Heaven" for the Sparks album Plagiarism with production by Tony Visconti. His third album, entitled Manage The Damage, was released in 1999 via Gut Records, but failed to chart. A companion remix album, Root Beer, came out in 2000. His dance-orientated fourth solo album, Home Again, was released in 2004, again not charting.

In May 2009, Somerville released the Suddenly Last Summer album, which contained acoustic interpretations of other people's songs. The album was initially only available as a digital download but in May 2010 was made available in a limited edition (3,000 copies) CD/DVD in the UK. In late 2010, Somerville released a dance EP called Bright Thing. 2010's EP Bright Thing was the first of a series of three, with Somerville releasing Momentum in 2011 and Solent in 2012, with long-term collaborator John Winfield.

Somerville released a disco-inspired album called Homage in 2015. Singles were "Back to Me" followed by "Travesty". The emphasis in recording the album was on achieving the musical authenticity of original disco which Somerville grew up listening to. He stated: "I've finally made the disco album I always wanted to and never thought I could."

He has also had an acting career, appearing in Sally Potter's 1992 film of Virginia Woolf's Orlando, in Isaac Julien's 1989 Looking for Langston, and in an episode of the cult science fiction television series Lexx ("Girltown").

In February 2021, Somerville teamed up with producer Sally Herbert (formerly of 1990s duo Banderas and also part of The Communards' backing band) to record a cover of "Everything Must Change" by Benard Ighner as a charity record for End Youth Homelessness, a network of projects which includes Centrepoint in London and a number of other homeless charity organisations around the UK.

== Discography ==
Studio albums

- Read My Lips (1989)
- Dare to Love (1995)
- Manage the Damage (1999)
- Home Again (2004)
- Suddenly Last Summer (2009)
- Homage (2015)

with Bronski Beat

- The Age of Consent (1984)

with The Communards

- Communards (1986)
- Red (1987)

== Awards and nominations ==
| Award | Year | Nominated work | Category | Result | |
|---|---|---|---|---|---|
| BFI – Grierson Awards | 1984 | Framed Youth: The Revenge of the Teenage Perverts | Best Documentary | Won | (Note: Shared with Trill Burton, Jeff Cole, Rose Collis, Nicola Field, Toby Kettle and Pom Martin.) |
| Brit Awards | 1985 | Bronski Beat | Best British Group | Nominated | (Note: Shared as Bronski Beat.) |
| Brit Awards | 1985 | "Smalltown Boy" | Best British Single | Nominated | (Note: Shared as Bronski Beat.) |
| Brit Awards | 1987 | "Don't Leave Me This Way" | Best British Single | Nominated | (Note: Shared as the Communards.) |
| Brit Awards | 1991 | Himself | Best British Male Artist | Nominated | |
| R.SH Gold Awards | 1991 | "To Love Somebody" | Power Groove of the Year | Won | (Note: R.SH Gold was an annual music show (1998 – 2000), held in Northern Germany by Radio Schleswig-Holstein, a state private station. The event that took place at the Ostseehalle in Kiel, the radio's base, awarded the most successful local artists of the past year, based on their top positions on the R.SH Nordparade chart (founded in the region in 1996). The 4th ceremony featuring Somerville was held on 16 February 1991, while broadcast the 28th via RTL Plus.) |
| Scottish Music Awards | 2014 | Himself | Special Recognition Award | Honored | (Note: Also known as the Tartan Clefs.) |
| UK Festival Awards | 2010 | 80's Rewind | Critics' Choice Award | Nominated | |
The listed years are of the annual ceremonies, usually recognizing achievements for the previous calendar year.
Online polls
| Queerty Awards | 2014 | "Travesty" | Earworm of the Year | Nominated | |

== See also ==
- List of artists who reached number one on the US Dance chart
- List of gay, lesbian or bisexual people
- List of Glaswegians
- List of performers on Top of the Pops
- List of Scottish musicians
- List of synthpop artists
