= Communards (album) =

Studio album by the Communards
- Released: 14 July 1986
- Studios: Sigma Sound, New York City; Rawlston Recording, New York City (Note: Additional recording); Westside, London, UK
- Genres: Synth-pop; dance-pop
- Length: 43:13 (LP); 62:39 (CD)
- Label: London
- Producer: Mike Thorne

The Communards chronology
Communards (1986)	Red (1987)

Singles from Communards
- 1. "You Are My World" Released: September 1985; 2. "Disenchanted" Released: May 1986; 3. "Don't Leave Me This Way" Released: 11 August 1986; 4. "So Cold the Night" Released: 17 November 1986

Professional ratings
Review scores
Source	Rating
AllMusic	4.0/5 stars
The Rolling Stone Album Guide	2.5/5 stars

Communards is the debut studio album by British synth-pop duo the Communards, released on 14 July 1986 by London Records. The album was produced by Mike Thorne, who had previously produced lead singer Jimmy Somerville's earlier band, Bronski Beat. Although the singles released ahead of the album were only moderately successful, the first single to be lifted from it after release, "Don't Leave Me This Way", topped the UK Singles Chart for four weeks and became the best-selling single in the UK that year. During the single's four-week run at number one, the album itself peaked at number seven, going on to spend a total of 45 weeks in the UK Albums Chart.

Musically, the album contains tracks that largely fall into one of two styles, either Hi-NRG (all of the singles lifted from the album were in this style) or piano ballads showcasing the talents of Richard Coles, a classically trained pianist. The standard "Lover Man" is arranged as a straight jazz number, albeit with the unusual twist of being performed as a duet.

The front sleeve features a stark graphic design consisting of the group's name and logo against a black background. A photo of the duo appears on the back, while the inner sleeve features small photos of Coles, Somerville and Sarah Jane Morris, alongside the album credits and full lyrics for all the songs.

Two songs had dedications in the sleevenotes: "Don't Leave Me This Way" was dedicated to the GLC, and "Reprise" to Prime Minister Margaret Thatcher.

== Track listing ==
All tracks by Jimmy Somerville and Richard Coles, except where noted.

=== Original 1986 LP release ===
1. "Don't Leave Me This Way" (Kenneth Gamble, Leon Huff, Cary Gilbert) – 4:50
2. "La Dolarosa" – 2:43
3. "Disenchanted" – 4:13
4. "Reprise" – 5:22
5. "So Cold the Night" – 5:45
6. "You Are My World" – 4:30
7. "Lover Man" (Jimmy Davis, Roger Ramirez, Jimmy Sherman) – 3:52
8. "Don't Slip Away" – 2:58
9. "Heavens Above" – 3:58
10. "Forbidden Love" – 5:02

=== Original 1986 CD release ===
1. "Don't Leave Me This Way" – 6:26
2. "La Dolarosa" – 2:43
3. "Disenchanted" – 6:12
4. "Reprise" – 5:22
5. "So Cold the Night" – 6:48
6. "You Are My World" – 8:01
7. "Lover Man" – 3:52
8. "Don't Slip Away" – 2:58
9. "Heavens Above" – 3:58
10. "Forbidden Love" – 5:02
11. "Breadline Britain" – 2:31
12. "Disenchanted" (dance) – 8:46

=== 1997 CD reissue ===
1. "Don't Leave Me This Way" – 4:50
2. "La Dolarosa" – 2:43
3. "Disenchanted" – 4:13
4. "Reprise" – 5:22
5. "So Cold the Night" – 5:45
6. "You Are My World" – 4:30
7. "Lover Man" – 3:52
8. "Don't Slip Away" – 2:58
9. "Heavens Above" – 3:58
10. "Forbidden Love" – 5:02
11. "Breadline Britain" – 2:31
12. "Don't Leave Me This Way" (Mega Mixes) – 22:55

The 1997 remastered version of the album replaces "Disenchanted" (dance) with "Don't Leave Me This Way (Mega Mixes)", a 22:55 version of the song which also incorporates the Communards song "Sanctified". This track was originally issued in 1986 as "The Gotham City Mix", when it was split across two sides of a 12-inch single.

=== 2012 CD reissue ===
Disc one

1. "Don't Leave Me This Way" – 4:52
2. "La Dolarosa" – 2:43
3. "Disenchanted" – 4:13
4. "Reprise" – 5:23
5. "So Cold the Night" – 5:46
6. "You Are My World" – 4:30
7. "Lover Man" – 3:52
8. "Don't Slip Away" – 2:58
9. "Heavens Above" – 3:59
10. "Forbidden Love" – 5:02
11. "Breadline Britain" – 2:31
12. "Disenchanted" (dance) – 8:44
13. "Judgement Day" – 5:14
14. "Don't Leave Me This Way" (Son of Gotham City Mix, part 1) – 11:42
15. "When the Walls Come Tumbling Down" (live) – 6:34

Disc two

1. "You Are My World" ('87 single version) – 4:16
2. "Don't Leave Me This Way" (Son of Gotham City Mix, part 3) – 10:23
3. "So Cold the Night" (remixed club version) – 8:24
4. "Heavens Above" (10" version) – 3:30
5. "Johnny Verso" – 3:46
6. "Sentimental Journey" (Les Brown/Ben Homer/Bud Green) – 3:36
7. "The Message" (Connie Giannaris/Jimmy Somerville) – 7:26
8. "Disenchanted" (instrumental) – 8:41
9. "So Cold the Night" (instrumental) – 9:10
10. "Never No More" (Alan Block/Don Hecht/Rita Ross) – 2:59
11. "Sanctified" – 2:36
12. "When the Walls Come Tumbling Down" – 4:23
13. "The Multimix" – 7:50
14. "Annie" – 1:43

=== 35th anniversary edition (2021) ===
Disc one

1. "Don't Leave Me This Way" – 6:27
2. "La Dolarosa" – 2:43
3. "Disenchanted" – 6:14
4. "Reprise" – 5:22
5. "So Cold the Night" – 6:48
6. "You Are My World" – 8:01
7. "Lover Man" – 3:52
8. "Don't Slip Away" – 2:58
9. "Heavens Above" – 3:59
10. "Forbidden Love" – 5:04
11. "Don't Leave Me This Way" (Son of Gotham City Mix, part 2) – 11:38
12. "Disenchanted" (dance) – 8:44
13. "Sentimental Journey" – 3:33
14. "When the Walls Come Tumbling Down" – 4:20

Disc two

1. "So Cold the Night" (Janice Long 23rd October 1985) – 3:46
2. "Don't Slip Away" (Janice Long 23rd October 1985) – 2:33
3. "America" (Janice Long 23rd October 1985) – 4:16
4. "Forbidden Love" (Janice Long 23rd October 1985) – 2:49
5. "La Dolarosa" (Janice Long 23rd October 1985) – 2:36
6. "You Are My World" (extended 12" version) – 9:52
7. "Don't Leave Me This Way" ("Ruff" mix) – 8:27
8. "Heavens Above" ("Ruff" mix) – 3:19
9. "Summertime" (demo) – 3:17
10. "Lover Man" (alternative version) – 4:04
11. "Forbidden Love" (alternative version) – 5:01
12. "Breadline Britain" – 2:32
13. "Never No More" – 3:01
14. "So Cold the Night" (remix) – 8:22
15. "Judgement Day" – 5:14
16. "Don't Leave Me This Way" (7th Heaven club mix) – 8:25

== Charts ==
=== Weekly charts ===
Weekly chart performance for Communards
Chart (1986–1987)	Peak position
Australian Albums (Kent Music Report)	20
Dutch Albums (Album Top 100)	5
European Albums (Music & Media)	4
French Albums (IFOP)	8
German Albums (Offizielle Top 100)	15
Italian Albums (Musica e dischi)	18
New Zealand Albums (RMNZ)	26
Swedish Albums (Sverigetopplistan)	22
Swiss Albums (Schweizer Hitparade)	10
UK Albums (Official Charts)	7
US Billboard 200	90

Chart (2021)	Peak position
Scottish Albums (OCC)	63

=== Year-end charts ===
1986 year-end chart performance for Communards
Chart (1986)	Position
Dutch Albums (Album Top 100)	61
European Albums (Music & Media)	59
UK Albums (OCC)	32

1987 year-end chart performance for Communards
Chart (1987)	Position
European Albums (Music & Media)	17
German Albums (Offizielle Top 100)	74
UK Albums (Gallup)	98

== Certifications ==
Certifications for Communards
Region	Certification	Certified units/sales
France (SNEP)	Gold	100,000^{*}
Spain (Promusicae)	2× Platinum	200,000^{^}
United Kingdom (BPI)	Platinum	300,000^{^}
^{*} Sales figures based on certification alone.^{^} Shipments figures based on certification alone.
