= The Communards =

British synth-pop duo (1985–1988)

- The Communards in 1986. L-R: Somerville and Coles

Background information
- Origin: London, United Kingdom
- Genres: Synth-pop; dance-pop; hi-NRG; disco
- Years active: 1985–1988
- Label: London
- Spinoff of: Bronski Beat
- Past members: Jimmy Somerville; Richard Coles

The Communards were a British synth-pop duo formed in London in 1985. They consisted of Scottish singer Jimmy Somerville and English musician Richard Coles. They are best known for their cover versions of "Don't Leave Me This Way", originally recorded by Harold Melvin & the Blue Notes featuring Teddy Pendergrass, and of the Jackson 5's "Never Can Say Goodbye".

The name Communards refers to the revolutionaries of the 1871 Paris Commune.

== History ==
=== Formation (1985) ===
The Communards formed in 1985 after singer Jimmy Somerville left his earlier band Bronski Beat to team up with classically trained musician Richard Coles. Somerville often used a falsetto/countertenor singing style. Coles, though mainly a pianist, played a number of instruments and had been seen previously performing the clarinet solos on the Bronski Beat hit "It Ain't Necessarily So". They were joined by bass player Dave Renwick, who had also played with Bronski Beat.

=== Breakthrough and Communards (1985–1987) ===
The band had their first UK top 30 hit in 1985 with the piano-based number 30 single "You Are My World". The following year, they had their biggest hit with an energetic hi-NRG cover version of Harold Melvin and the Blue Notes' soul classic "Don't Leave Me This Way" (in a version inspired by Thelma Houston's cover) which spent four weeks at number one and became the UK's biggest selling single of 1986. It also made the US top 40. It featured Sarah Jane Morris as co-vocalist, taking advantage of the contrast between Morris's deep and rounded contralto and Somerville's soaring falsetto.

On one Top of the Pops episode, with the song being mimed, Morris and Somerville changed roles so that Somerville appeared to sing the deep notes and Morris the high ones. Morris performed both backing and co-lead vocals on many of the Communards' other recordings, and appeared in group photos as an unofficial third member. Later that year, the Communards had another UK top 10 hit with the single "So Cold the Night", which reached number 8.

=== Red and split (1987–1988) ===
In 1987, they released an album titled Red, which was partly produced by Stephen Hague. Red featured a cover version of the Jackson 5 hit "Never Can Say Goodbye" (in a version inspired by Gloria Gaynor's cover), which the Communards took to number 4 on the UK chart. Their last released single was "There's More to Love (Than Boy Meets Girl)" in 1988, which reached number 20 and was their final top 20 hit. Red is also noteworthy for "Victims" and "For a Friend" (also released as a single), which relates to people living with, and having died from, HIV/AIDS and was written in memory of activist Mark Ashton.

The Communards split in 1988. Somerville pursued a solo musical career, while Coles was ordained as an Anglican priest in 2005, serving as a parish priest in Northamptonshire until he retired in 2022.

== Discography ==
- Communards (1986)
- Red (1987)

== See also ==
- Banderas – Communards offshoot featuring backing musician Sally Herbert
- Jimmy Somerville discography
- June Miles-Kingston
- List of artists who reached number one on the U.S. Dance Club Songs chart
- List of Billboard number-one dance club songs
