= Clifton Davis =

American actor, musician and minister (born 1945)

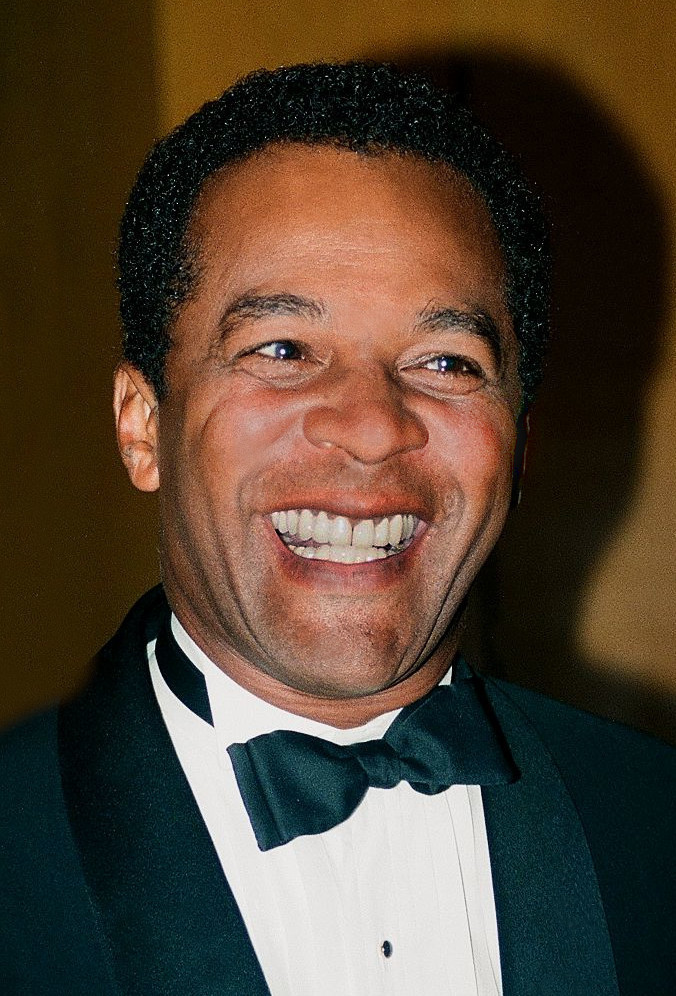
- Davis in 1998
- Born: Clifton Duncan Davis; October 4, 1945 (age 80); Chicago, Illinois, U.S.
- Occupations: Actor; singer; songwriter; minister; author
- Years active: 1968–present
- Known for: That's My Mama, Amen
- Spouses: Ann Taylor (m. 1981; div. 1991); Monica Durant (m. 2000)
- Children: 2, with Taylor
- Website: www.cliftondavis.com

Clifton Duncan Davis (born October 4, 1945) is an American actor, singer, songwriter, minister, and author.

Davis wrote The Jackson 5's No. 2 hit "Never Can Say Goodbye" in 1971. He has numerous Broadway credits, including Hello, Dolly! (opposite Pearl Bailey); Aladdin; Wicked; and his Tony Award–nominated turn in Two Gentlemen of Verona, among others. Davis starred in the television shows That's My Mama, Amen, Madam Secretary, and others. He has hosted the Stellar Gospel Music Awards, Gospel Superfest and Lifestyle Magazine. Davis has appeared on the game shows Match Game and Pyramid and appeared in many movies.

Davis is a minister of a Baptist church and has also operated an interdenominational ministry for many years. He has been a guest on the Trinity Broadcasting Network many times. Davis wrote "A Mason-Dixon Memory", one of the chapters in the book Chicken Soup for the Teenage Soul, about the racism that he experienced while growing up.

== Early life ==
Davis was born in Chicago, Illinois, the son of Thelma van Putten Langhorn, a nurse, and Toussaint L'Ouverture Davis, a Seventh-day Adventist minister. He was raised in Mastic, New York, and he is a graduate of Pine Forge Academy, a Black boarding school operated by the Seventh-day Adventist Church. Davis holds a BA in Theology from Oakwood University and a Master of Divinity degree from Andrews University.

== Career ==
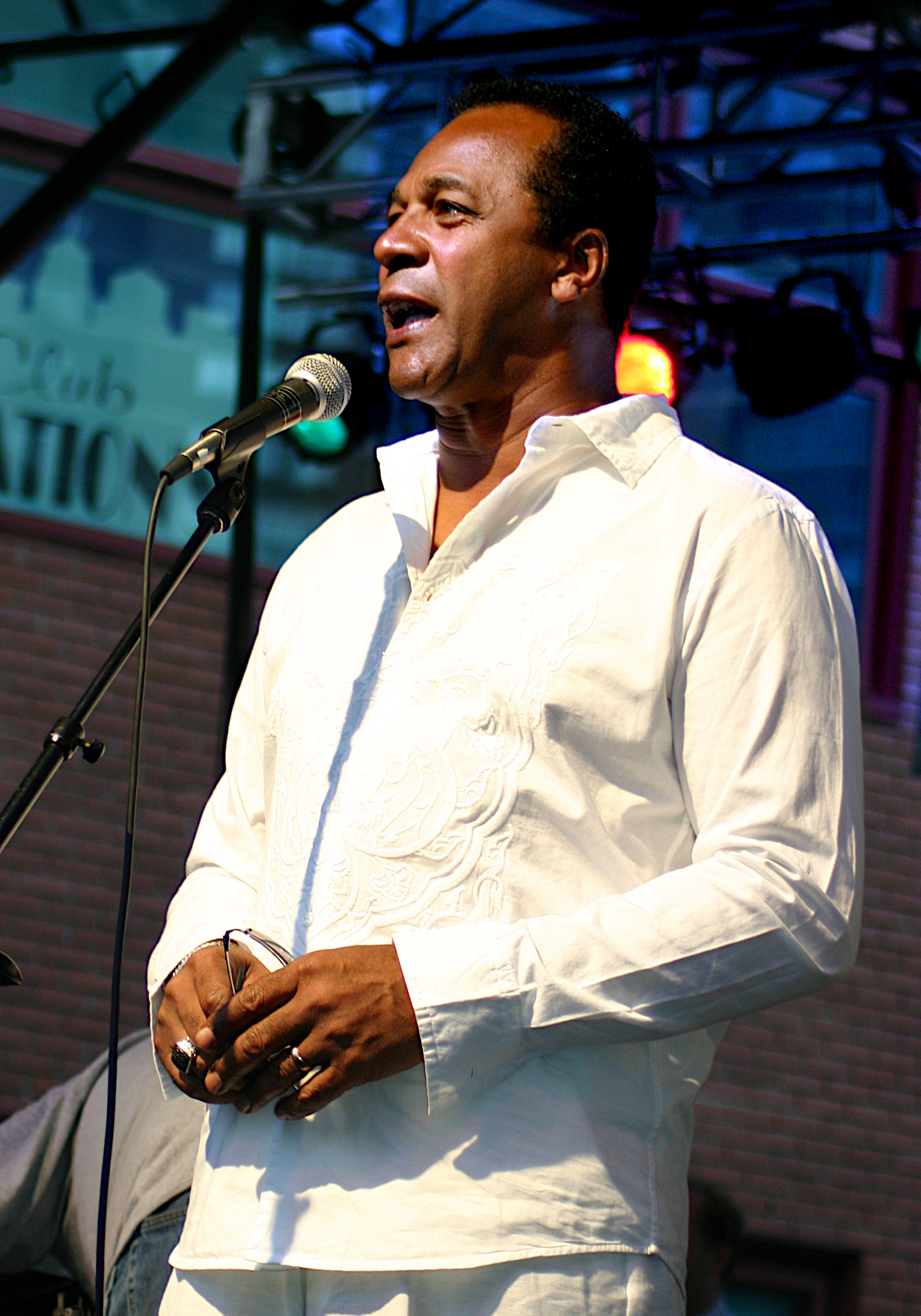
Davis in a club

Before becoming an actor Davis was a songwriter who wrote The Jackson 5's No. 2 hit "Never Can Say Goodbye."

He made his Broadway debut in the mid-1960s as a replacement in the original Broadway production of Hello, Dolly! In 1969, he replaced Cleavon Little in the role of Lee Haines in Jimmy Shine, opposite Dustin Hoffman and Rue McClanahan. The following year, he served as standby for Al Freeman, Jr. in the short-lived Broadway play Look to the Lillies, followed by a featured role in The Engagement Baby. He created the role of Valentine in Galt MacDermot and John Guare's musical Two Gentlemen of Verona, based on the eponymous Shakespeare comedy. For this production, he was nominated for a 1972 Tony Award for Best Actor in a Musical. He left the Broadway production on November 27, 1972, to open the touring company in January 1973. He played the role of Joey Evans in the 1978 West Coast Revival of Pal Joey, which was called Pal Joey '78. He returned to Broadway in 2014, creating the role of the Sultan in the stage adaptation of Disney's Aladdin. In 2022, Davis joined the Broadway company of Wicked, playing Dr. Dillamond, a role he had previously played in the show's two separate touring companies. He has amassed several Off-Broadway credits as well, including How to Steal an Election (1968), Horseman, Pass By (1969), Lorraine Hansberry's To Be Young, Gifted, and Black (1969), Do It Again! (1971), and Hapgood (1994).

He starred as barber Clifton Curtis in the mid-1970s television show That's My Mama with Theresa Merritt, Theodore Wilson, and Ted Lange.

Davis co-starred with singer and Broadway performer Melba Moore on their musical variety television show. Later he made a guest appearance on the third episode of the first season of The Bobby Vinton Show in September 1975, singing "I've Got the Music in Me" and "Never Can Say Goodbye". He sang the Polish lyrics with Vinton to the show's theme song, titled "My Melody of Love".

A triple heart bypass survivor, Davis participated in the "Superstars" celebrity TV sports competitions of the 1970s as well as made several appearances as one of the celebrity panelists on the game show Match Game. He appeared in the film Scott Joplin, in 1977. Davis made numerous appearances on several incarnations of Pyramid from the early 1970s to the early 1990s.

From 1986 to 1991, Davis co-starred with Sherman Hemsley and Anna Maria Horsford as the Reverend Doctor Ruben Gregory in the sitcom Amen, which ran for five seasons. Davis released one acclaimed studio recording in 1991 on Benson Records titled Say Amen. He also played the mayor of Miami in the 1999 film Any Given Sunday. Davis starred in Toronto and on Broadway in Aladdin, playing the Sultan of Agrabah.

In October 2024, it was announced Davis had been cast as Vernon Dupree on the new CBS soap opera Beyond the Gates. The serial premiered in February 2025.

== Ministry ==
From 1987 to 1989, he was an Associate Pastor of the Loma Linda University Seventh-day Adventist Church in southern California. For the last twenty-five years, Davis has been an active member of Youthville, USA, a children's services organization. He served as the co-founder and co-pastor of the Welcome Christian Center in Huntington Beach, California. Davis is a licensed minister at St. Luke Baptist Church, New York, New York. He has had an interdenominational ministry for over 30 years. Davis has served as its National Spokesperson and Advisory Board Chairman. He is the emcee and host of The Most Soulful Sound, an annual gospel choir competition in Raleigh, North Carolina. Davis also hosts an annual celebrity golf tournament in Elizabeth City State University, where he served as its vice chancellor for Institutional Advancement. Since the end of 2005, Davis has held the position of executive director for Welcome America, a non-profit organization located in Philadelphia, Pennsylvania, which hosts the largest Fourth of July celebration in the nation each year. He is a frequent guest and host on the Trinity Broadcasting Network. Davis also hosted the TV show Gospel Superfest from 2000 to 2008, syndicated by United Television.

== Filmography ==
=== Film ===
Year	Title	Role	Notes
1972	Together for Days	Gus	
1974	Lost in the Stars	Absalom	
1977	Scott Joplin	Louis Chauvin	
1994	Heart of Stone	Richard Polite	
1999	Any Given Sunday	Mayor Tyrone Smalls	
2001	Kingdom Come	Charles Winslow	
2001	Max Keeble's Big Move	Supt. Bobby 'Crazy Legs' Knebworth	
2001	The Painting	Thomas Ayers	
2002	The Climb	Cheryl's Dad	
2006	The Engagement: My Phamily BBQ 2	Uncle Joe	
2007	Cover	D.A. Simmons	
2012	David E. Talbert's What My Husband Doesn't Know	Franklin	
2013	God's Amazing Grace... Is Just A Prayer Away	Wilbert Richardson	
2016	Prayer Never Fails	Michael Brown	
2020	A Shot Through the Wall	Deputy Chief Bill Walker	
2022	We Are Gathered Here Today	Joe Wyatt	

=== Television ===
Year	Title	Role	Notes
1971	A World Apart	Matt Hampton	2 episodes
1972	The Melba Moore-Clifton Davis Show	Co-host	Series
1973	Love Story	James Monroe	Episode "A Glow of Dying Embers"
1973, 1977	Police Story	Mark Randolph / Ed Webber	Episodes: "The Ho Chi Minh Trail" & "The Malflores"
1974	The Wide World of Mystery	Saxon	Episode: "Legacy of Blood"
1974–1975	That's My Mama	Clifton Curtis	39 episodes
1977	Little Ladies of the Night	Comfort	TV movie
1978	Superdome	P.K. Jackson	TV movie
1978	Cindy	Captain Joe Prince	TV movie
1979	Vega$	Leon Hazlett	Episode: "The Eleventh Event"
1980	The Love Boat	Mr. Reeves	Episode: "Invisible Maniac"
1980	The Littlest Hobo	Phil McLean	Episode: "Licence to Steal"
1980	The Night the City Screamed	Arnold Clements	TV movie
1981	Don't Look Back: The Story of Leroy 'Satchel' Paige	Cool Papa Bell	TV movie
1986–1991	Amen	Reverend Reuben Gregory	110 episodes
1989	Dream Date	Bill Fairview	TV movie
1990–1994	Stellar Gospel Music Awards	Co-host	Specials
1993	The John Larroquette Show	Jada Sweet	Episode: "Pros and Cons"
1996	The Jamie Foxx Show	Charles	Episode: "Seems Like Old Times"
1997	Living Single	Harrison Cushmore	Episode: "Mother Inferior"
1997	Sparks	Pastor Alexander	Episode: "It's the Gospel"
1997	Malcolm & Eddie	Leonard Larson	Episode: "Club Story"
1997	Party of Five	Martin Wilcox	Episode: "Point of No Return"
1997	Grace Under Fire	Dr. Swanson	Episode: "Sam's Dad"
1997	The Sentinel	President Lemec	Episode: "Fool Me Twice"
1997	The Gregory Hines Show	Pauley's Father	Episode: "Three's Not Company"
1998	Any Day Now	Councilman Lyle Hammond	Episode: "No Comment"
1999	In the House	Ted Miller	2 episodes
2000	City of Angels	Dr. Langston Ellis	Episode: "Bride and Prejudice"
2000	Veronica's Closet	Brian's Father	Episode: "Veronica Checks Out"
2000–2008	Gospel Superfest	Host	
2001	Lifestyle Magazine	Host	Series
2002	American Dreams	Alvin Lewis	Episode: "The Home Front"
2004	Half & Half	Pastor David Adams	Episode: "The Big Practice What You Preach Episode"
2004	Halloweentown High	Principal Phil Flannagan	TV movie
2012	Political Animals	Reporter	Episode: "Pilot"
2012	Mr. Box Office	Judge	Episode: "Pilot"
2013	The First Family	Clayton	Episode: "The First Triangle"
2015–2019	Madam Secretary	Ephraim Ware	42 episodes
2017	Iron Fist	Lawrence Wilkins	5 episodes
2017	The Good Fight	Anthony Spiegel	Episode: "Not So Grand Jury"
2017–2023	Billions	Judge Wailand	6 episodes
2018	New Amsterdam	Pierre Pampil	Episode: "Rituals"
2018	Blue Bloods	Inspector Azoulay	Episode: "Mind Games"
2019	I Think You Should Leave with Tim Robinson	Jeffrey Carter	Episode: "It's the Cigars You Smoke That Are Going to Give You Cancer"
2019–2021	Godfather of Harlem	Elijah Muhammad	6 episodes
2023	Survival of the Thickest	Emmanuel	Episode: "Let It Out, Bitch!"
2024	Clipped	Elgin Baylor	4 episodes
2025	Beyond the Gates	Vernon Dupree	series regular
