= Richard Coles =

British musician, writer, presenter and priest (born 1962)

The Reverend Richard Coles FRSA FKC
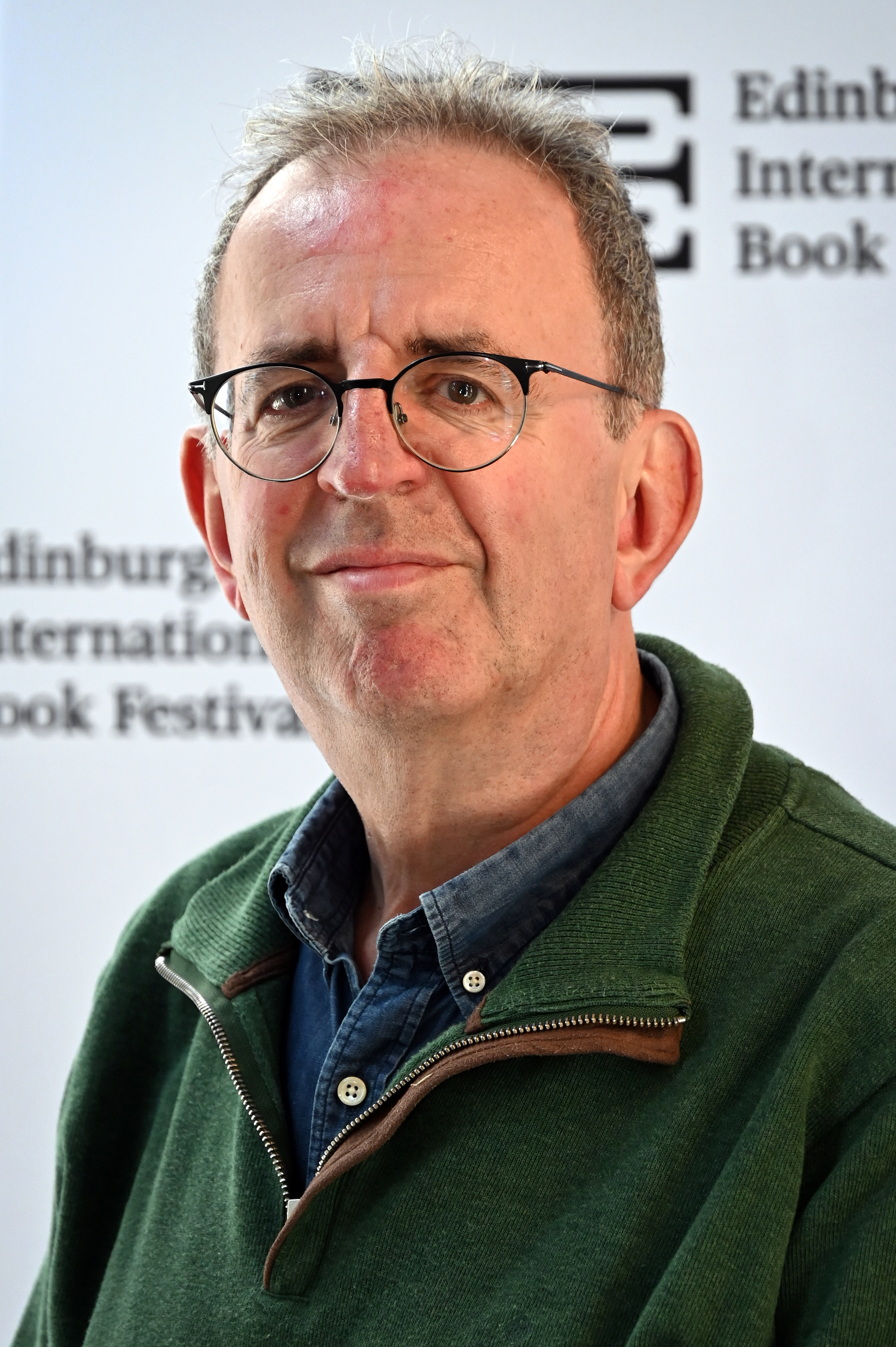
- Coles in 2025
- Born: Richard Keith Robert Coles; 26 March 1962 (age 64); Northampton, England
- Education: South Warwickshire College of Further Education; King's College London (BA); University of Leeds (MA); College of the Resurrection
- Spouse: David Oldham (cp. 2010; died 2019)
- Partner: Richard Cant

Ecclesiastical career
- Religion: Christianity (Anglican)
- Church: Church of England
- Ordained: 2005
- Congregations: St Botolph's Church, Boston; St Paul's Church, Knightsbridge; St Mary the Virgin, Finedon
- Offices held: Chaplain of the Royal Academy of Music; Chancellor of the University of Northampton (2017–present)
- Website: www.richardcoles.com

Richard Keith Robert Coles FRSA FKC (born 26 March 1962) is an English writer, radio presenter, Church of England priest and former musician. After playing in the 1980s band Bronski Beat, he came to prominence as the multi-instrumentalist who partnered Jimmy Somerville in the band the Communards. They achieved three UK top-10 hits, including the No. 1 record and best-selling single of 1986, a cover version of "Don't Leave Me This Way".

Coles frequently appears on radio and television as well as in newspapers and, from March 2011 until March 2023, was the co-host of BBC Radio 4's Saturday Live programme. He is a regular contributor to the television shows QI, Would I Lie to You? and Have I Got News for You. He is the chancellor of the University of Northampton, a former honorary chaplain to the Worshipful Company of Leathersellers, and a patron of social housing project Greatwell Homes in Wellingborough.

== Early life ==
Coles was born in Northampton and grew up in Barton Seagrave, near Kettering. He is the middle of three boys. His grandfather was a prosperous shoe manufacturer. The company struggled under Coles's father, and the family lost much of its wealth.

He was educated at the independent Wellingborough School (where he was a choirboy), and at the South Warwickshire College of Further Education (Department of Drama & the Liberal Arts) in Stratford-upon-Avon. He later attended King's College London, where he studied theology from 1990. Coles was awarded an MA by research from the University of Leeds in 2005 for work on the Greek text of the Epistle to the Ephesians.

== Career ==
=== Music ===
Coles learned to play the saxophone, clarinet and keyboards. He moved to London in 1980 where he worked as a musician in theatres. In 1983 he appeared with Jimmy Somerville in the Lesbian and Gay Youth Video Project film Framed Youth: The Revenge of the Teenage Perverts, which won the Grierson Award. Coles joined Bronski Beat, initially on saxophone, in 1983.

Somerville left Bronski Beat, and in 1985 he and Coles formed the Communards, who were together for just over three years and had three UK top 10 hits, including the biggest-selling single of 1986, a version of "Don't Leave Me This Way", which was at number one for four weeks. The band split in 1988 and Somerville went solo.

=== Church ministry ===
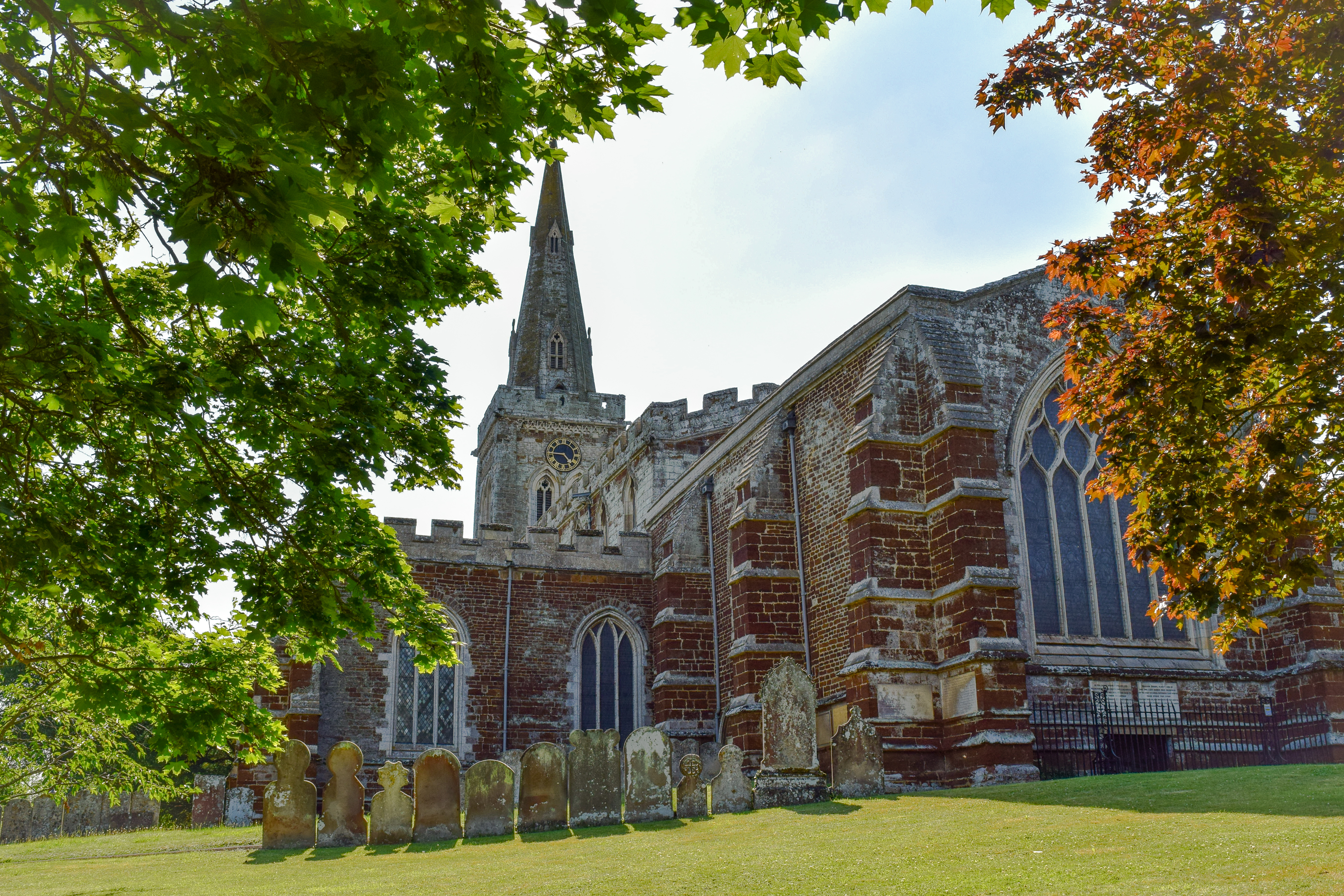
The Church of St Mary the Virgin, Finedon, Northamptonshire

Coles provided narration for the Style Council's film JerUSAlem in 1987 and also started a career as a writer, particularly with the Times Literary Supplement and the Catholic Herald. He took up religion in his late twenties, after "the best of times, the worst of times" pop success and the deaths of friends as a result of HIV. From 1991 to 1994 he studied for a BA in theology at King's College London. While at university, Coles became a Roman Catholic and remained so for the next ten years before returning to Anglicanism in 2001.

Coles was selected for training for the priesthood in the Church of England and began his training at the College of the Resurrection, Mirfield, West Yorkshire, in 2003. He was ordained in 2005. After ordination, he was a curate at St Botolph's Church in Boston, Lincolnshire and then at St Paul's Church, Knightsbridge, in London. He has been chaplain of the Royal Academy of Music, played Dr Frank N Furter in a local concert and officiated an atheist funeral for Mo Mowlam in 2005.

Coles was an inspiration for the character of Adam Smallbone (played by Tom Hollander) in the BBC Two sitcom Rev. and was also an advisor to the show. Coles mentions in his book Fathomless Riches that he is also the inspiration for the character "Tom" in the Bridget Jones novels. In January 2011, Coles was appointed as vicar of St Mary the Virgin, Finedon, in the Diocese of Peterborough.

Since 2011, Coles has been on the board of Wellingborough Homes, a social enterprise providing housing and community support for the Borough of Wellingborough and, after its name change to Greatwell Homes, became its Patron. In 2012, Coles was awarded an honorary doctorate by the University of Northampton and also became a fellow of the Royal Society of Arts. In 2016, he was awarded an honorary DLitt by the University of Warwick. In 2019, he was appointed Honorary Chaplain to the Worshipful Company of Leathersellers.

In July 2017, Coles was elected a fellow of King's College London and separately as chancellor of the University of Northampton. Coles retired as vicar of Finedon on Low Sunday 2022. Looking back on his time as a "half-time vicar", he said: "'How do you do all the things you do?' I am frequently asked, and the answer is by neglecting important things and disappointing people. I was once called in the middle of the night to attend a parishioner's deathbed and I could not because I was in Glasgow doing Celebrity Antiques Road Trip. I found someone to cover, but it should have been me." He explained: "I will still be a priest, I will always be a priest, and I will minister where I am able. Next month I am going to my first conference of prison chaplains and I hope I can make myself useful as a volunteer with inmates in the criminal justice system."

In April 2022, Coles announced that he retired from parish duties due to the Church of England reputedly increasingly excluding gay couples, and what he described as its "conservative, punchy and fundamentalist" direction.

=== Writing ===
==== Biography ====
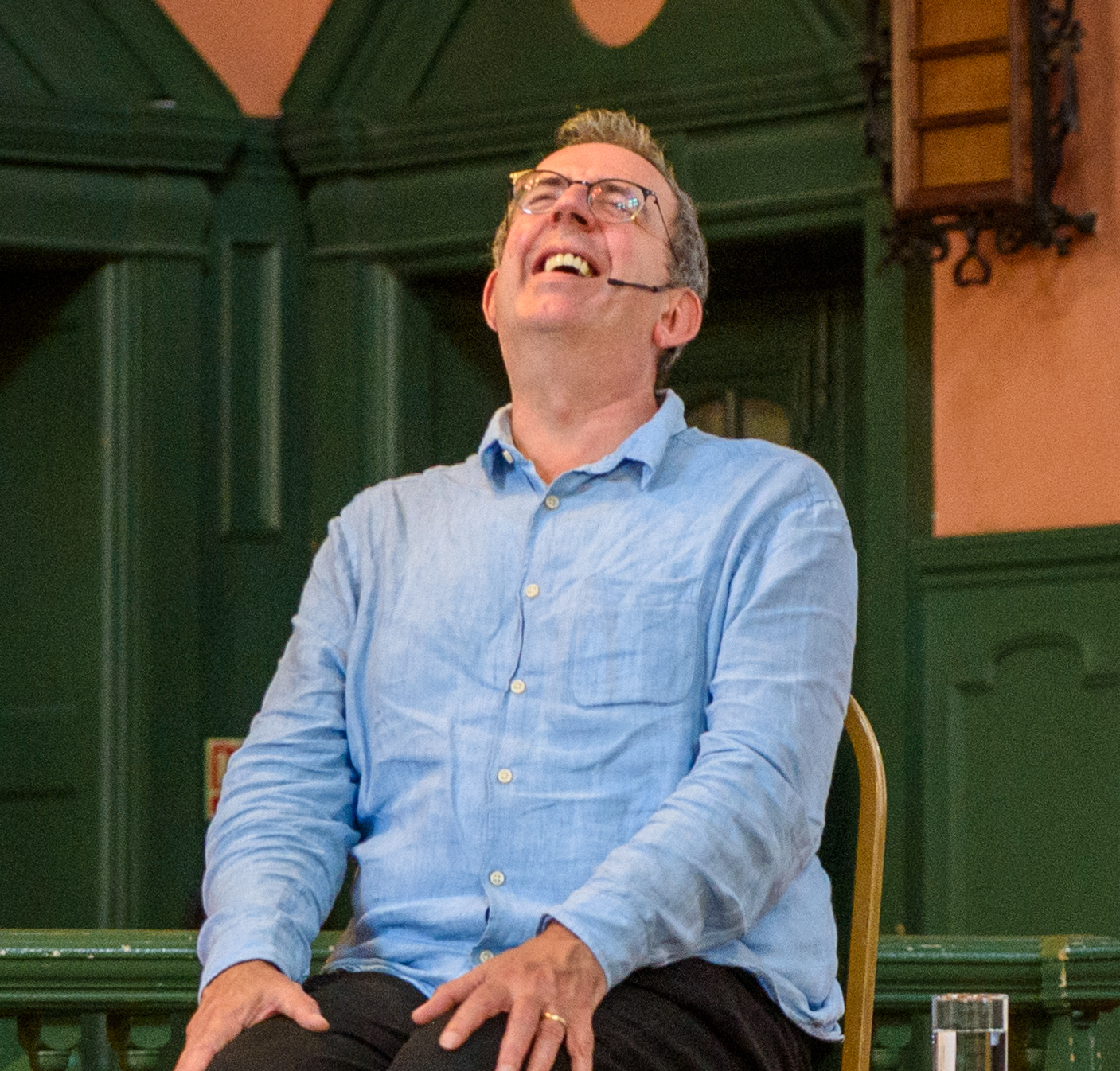
Coles at the 2022 Chiswick Book Festival

On 1 November 2012 (All Saints' Day), Darton, Longman and Todd published Coles's book Lives of the Improbable Saints, illustrated by Ted Harrison, a précis of the life stories of nearly 200 lesser-known saints. In the following year volume two, Legends of the Improbable Saints, was published.

In 2014, the first volume of his memoirs, Fathomless Riches, was published by Weidenfeld & Nicolson (W&N). A follow-up volume, Bringing in the Sheaves, was published in 2016.

==== Fiction ====
In June 2022, Coles's debut novel Murder Before Evensong was released. It is the first in the cozy mystery series about Canon Daniel Clement, the rector of the fictional village of Champton during the late 1980s and early 1990s, who becomes involved in the solving of local murders.

Shortly after publication, Murder Before Evensong was optioned for a television adaptation, with Coles serving as an executive producer. In December 2024, Matthew Lewis was cast as Canon Clement. Filming got underway on the adaptation in February 2025, with the series being released on 29 September 2025. A theatrical adaptation debuted at the Watermill Theatre in late 2026, with Ian Hallard as Clement.

The first Canon Clement sequel, A Death in the Parish, was published on 8 June 2023. In 2023, Coles signed a deal with W&N to write three more Canon Clement books. The first of these, Murder at the Monastery, was released in June 2024.

=== Broadcasting and media ===
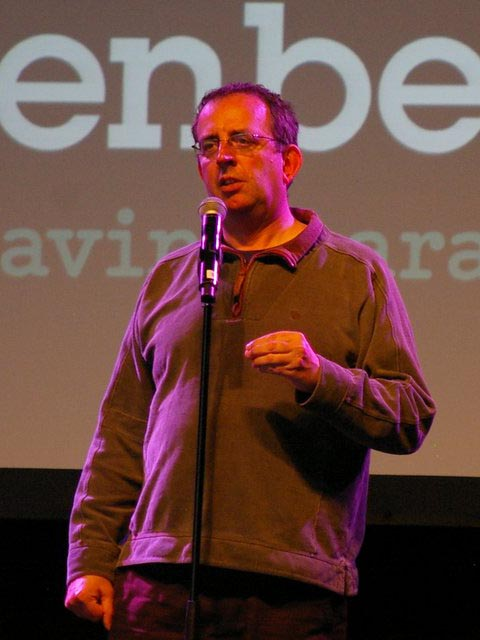
Coles speaking at Greenbelt Festival, 2012

Coles still works as a broadcaster, which he describes as "just showing off", on programmes including Nightwaves on BBC Radio 3, which he formerly presented, and Newsnight Review on BBC Two. He has appeared on the Radio 4 panel game show Heresy twice: first in May 2008 and then in May 2010. He had earlier guested regularly as a camp Robin Hood on Dan and Nick: The Wildebeest Years. Coles has appeared eight times as a guest on the topical television news quiz Have I Got News for You: in 1994, May 2009, May 2013, April 2016, June 2017, April 2020, May 2021, and December 2025. He presented a special edition of Songs of Praise in January 2010. He was a guest on the Children in Need special of the BBC quiz Only Connect in November of the same year. In 2011, he presented a four-part Radio 3 series called Out in the World: A Global Gay History.

He regularly guest-hosted the Radio 4 programme Saturday Live, while the regular host Fi Glover was on maternity leave from 2008 to 2009. Coles replaced Glover permanently in 2011. On 1 September 2011, he presented a short piece on his home town and parish of Finedon for the Radio 4 programme You and Yours. In December 2012, December 2013 and November 2014, Coles appeared as a guest on the BBC comedy quiz show QI. In January 2014, he won the BBC's Celebrity Mastermind, with his specialist subject being the Mapp and Lucia novels of E. F. Benson. Coles featured as the subject of Fern Britton Meets... on BBC1 in December 2014. Since 2014 he has appeared regularly in the "Pause for Thought" slot on Radio 2's The Chris Evans Breakfast Show, for which he won a Jerusalem Award in 2014.

In July 2016, Coles appeared on the BBC cooking series Celebrity Masterchef, finishing in fifth place. In December 2021, he once again appeared on the programme, this time winning the edition. In February 2017, he co-presented The Big Painting Challenge with Mariella Frostrup on BBC1. From September 2017, Coles was a contestant in the 15th series of BBC's Strictly Come Dancing. He was paired with professional dancer Dianne Buswell. They were the second couple to be eliminated after scoring 14 points for their Paso Doble to the theme from Flash Gordon – at the time, the lowest scoring Paso Doble in the history of the show.

On 18 December 2017, Coles was a guest panellist on the Christmas special of the eleventh series of BBC1 comedy quiz Would I Lie to You?, hosted by Rob Brydon. Coles was captain of a team from the University of Leeds who were series champions on the BBC's Christmas 2019 University Challenge. In December 2020 Coles was featured in the BBC series Winter Walks, walking from Sutton Bank to Rievaulx Abbey. He said, "At the centre of what we do in order to be who we are, we need silence, we need retreat, we need contemplation."

Coles appeared in a January 2021 episode of the BBC Four series Britain's Lost Masterpieces, discussing the story of the Magi in the gospels, in relation to a portrayal of Balthazar by Joos van Cleve. In August 2022, Coles appeared in the Channel 4 documentary Good Grief with Reverend Richard Coles, discovering some of the different ways people deal with bereavement. From 7 to 11 November 2022 Coles guest-hosted Channel 4's game show Countdown as part of its 40th-anniversary celebrations.

On 22 March 2023, The Guardian reported that Coles was disappointed to be leaving the BBC Radio 4 Saturday Live programme following that week's edition, due to the programme's relocation to Cardiff. On 17 May 2024, he was featured on the podcast Rosebud with Gyles Brandreth. From 21 November 2024, Coles was a contestant on the 2024 series of I'm a Celebrity...Get Me Out of Here!, coming third to runner-up Coleen Rooney and winner Danny Jones.

== Personal life ==
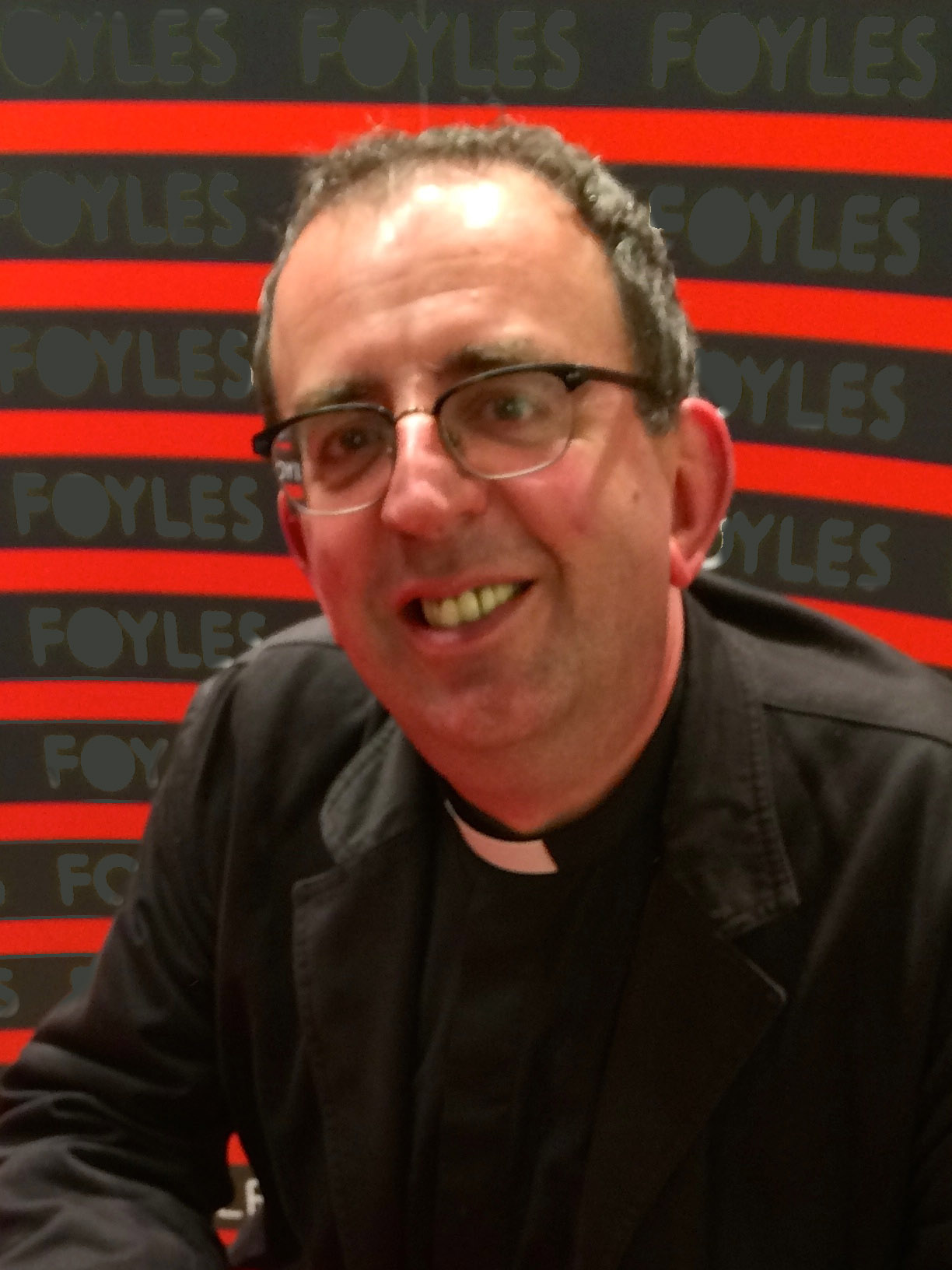
Coles in 2014

Richard Coles first came out as gay to his mother, in 1978, when he was 16. He played her the Tom Robinson Band's "Glad to Be Gay" four times, before she said "Darling, are you trying to tell me something?" Coles has spoken about the "mental crisis" that he suffered following his coming out, which ultimately led to him attempting suicide and being diagnosed with clinical depression.

Coles suffers from tinnitus in his right ear, the result of his performing loud pop music, which he described in 2020 as sounding "like something from the National Grid kind of powering through your ear ... can be very frustrating."

In 2007, Coles began a relationship with David Oldham, who was also an Anglican priest. In 2010, the couple entered into a civil partnership (which the Church of England has allowed clergy to do since 2005), with David taking Richard's surname. Coles stated at the time that the relationship was celibate, but later said that this had not been true, but he had to promise celibacy in order to maintain his job as a vicar. David Coles died in December 2019, with Coles stating in 2024 that he died from alcoholic liver disease. Coles said he had received hate mail saying that his partner is in hell.

In June 2023, Coles said that he was in a relationship with actor Richard Cant.

Coles's elder brother, Andy Coles, a former Metropolitan Police officer, was elected in 2015 as a Conservative councillor in Peterborough and was appointed deputy Cambridgeshire Police and Crime Commissioner in 2016. Following a reference to his earlier career as an undercover police officer in Coles's 2014 autobiography, he resigned as deputy commissioner over allegations of an inappropriate relationship with a political activist. The relationship was part of a wider UK undercover policing relationships scandal in this period.

As of 2019, Coles is a member of the Labour Party. He is also a member of the Gaelic Athletic Association (GAA), having become enthusiastic about GAA sports through watching the 2020 TV series Normal People. Family ties led to Coles selecting Cork as his county (hurling team/football team) and St Finbarr's as his club. The club responded by sending him a membership card.

Coles moved to Friston, East Sussex, in May 2022 to be closer to his friend and former manager Lorna Gradden. He said: "I'll be living in a charming 18th-century cottage with a bow window that looms over the street affording a privileged view of my neighbours' comings and goings, as the scent of lavender floats across the village green."

== Legal issues ==
In 1991, Coles sued accountants Coombes Wales Quinnell, who allegedly had refused to hand over financial records until £30,000 fees were paid.

== Works ==
=== Discography ===
- Communards (1986)
- Red (1987)

=== Bibliography ===
==== Non-fiction ====
- Lives of the Improbable Saints (illustrated by Ted Harrison, Darton, Longman & Todd, 2012, ISBN 978-0-232-52955-5)
- Legends of the Improbable Saints (illustrated by Ted Harrison, Darton, Longman & Todd, 2013, ISBN 978-0-232-53002-5)
- Fathomless Riches: Or How I Went From Pop to Pulpit (W&N, 2014, ISBN 978-0-297-87030-2)
- Bringing in the Sheaves: Wheat and Chaff from My Years as a Priest (W&N, 2016, ISBN 978-0-297-60988-9)
- Coles to Jerusalem: A Pilgrimage to the Holy Land with Reverend Richard Coles (Pallas Athene, 2016, ISBN 978-184-3-68143-4)
- The Madness of Grief: A Memoir of Love and Loss (W&N, 2021, ISBN 978-1-474-61962-2).
- The Rabbit Hole Book. With: Charles Spencer & Cat Jarman. (Michael Joseph, 2024, ISBN 978-0-241-68486-3).

===== Children's non-fiction =====
- A Heist Before Bedtime (illustrated by Eve O'Brien, Wren & Rook, 2026, ISBN 978-1-526-36766-2).

==== Fiction ====
===== Canon Clement Mysteries =====
- Murder Before Evensong (W&N, 2022, ISBN 978-139-9-63637-7)
- A Death in the Parish (W&N, 2023, ISBN 978-147-4-61268-5)
- Murder at the Monastery (W&N, 2024, ISBN 978-147-4-61272-2)
- Murder Under the Mistletoe (novella) (W&N, 2024, ISBN 978-139-9-62148-9)
- A Death on Location (W&N, 2025, ISBN 978-139-9-62141-0)
- A Carol and a Killing: A Canon Clement Christmas Novella (W&N, 2026, ISBN 978-139-9-63710-7)

===== Other Fiction =====
- The Unwelcome Guest (W&N, 2027, ISBN 978-1399621519)

== Honours ==
=== Chancellor, visitor, governor and fellowships ===
Location	Date	School	Position
England	2017 –	University of Northampton	Chancellor
England	July 2017 –	King's College London	Fellow (FKC)
England		Royal Academy of Music	Chaplain

=== Honorary degrees ===
Location	Date	School	Degree	Gave Commencement Address
England	2012	University of Northampton	Doctorate	
England	2016	University of Warwick	Doctor of Letters (D.Litt.)	

=== Memberships and fellowships ===
Country	Date	Organisation	Position
United Kingdom	2012 –	Royal Society of Arts	Fellow (FRSA)
United Kingdom	2019 –	Worshipful Company of Leathersellers	Honorary Chaplain
