= Don't Leave Me This Way =

1975 song by Harold Melvin & the Blue Notes

"Don't Leave Me This Way" is a song written by Kenneth Gamble, Leon Huff and Cary Gilbert. It was originally released in 1975 by Harold Melvin & the Blue Notes featuring Teddy Pendergrass, an act signed to Gamble & Huff's Philadelphia International label. "Don't Leave Me This Way" was subsequently covered by American singer Thelma Houston in 1976 and British synth-pop duo the Communards in 1986, both versions achieving commercial success.

== Harold Melvin & the Blue Notes original version ==
"Don't Leave Me This Way"
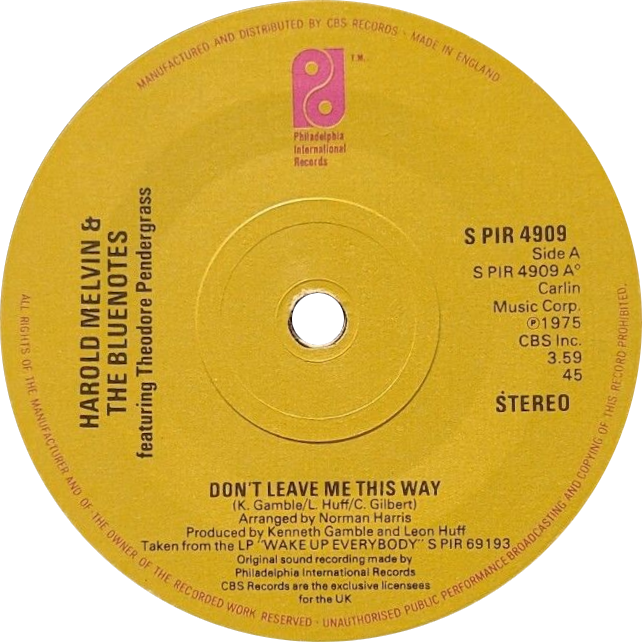
- Solid centre variant of the UK single

Single by Harold Melvin & the Blue Notes

from the album Wake Up Everybody
- B-side: "To Be Free to Be Who We Are"
- Released: November 1976
- Studio: Sigma Sound, Philadelphia, Pennsylvania
- Genre: Philadelphia soul
- Length: 6:08 (album version); 3:59 (7-inch edit); 7:07 (12-inch version); 11:00 (1984 version)
- Label: Philadelphia International
- Songwriters: Kenneth Gamble; Leon Huff; Cary Gilbert
- Producers: Kenneth Gamble; Leon Huff

Harold Melvin & the Blue Notes singles chronology
"Tell the World How I Feel about 'Cha Baby" (1976)	"Don't Leave Me This Way" (1976)	"Reaching for the World" (1977)

The Blue Notes' original version of the song, featuring Teddy Pendergrass's lead vocals, was included on the group's 1975 album Wake Up Everybody. Though not issued as a single in the United States at the time, the Blue Notes' recording reached number three on the US Billboard Hot Disco Singles chart in the wake of Thelma Houston's version. The song proved to be the group's highest-peaking entry in the United Kingdom, reaching number five on the UK Singles Chart, when released there as a single in 1977. It became the title track of a budget LP issued on the CBS Embassy label in the UK in 1978. The track was finally issued as a 12-inch single in the US in 1979, coupled with "Bad Luck".

=== Charts ===
1975 weekly chart performance for "Don't Leave Me This Way"
Chart (1975)	Peak position
US Disco (Billboard)	3

1977 weekly chart performance for "Don't Leave Me This Way"
Chart (1977)	Peak position
Australia (Kent Music Report)	78
Belgium (Ultratop 50 Flanders)	29
Sweden (Sverigetopplistan)	13
UK Singles (Official Charts)	5
West Germany (GfK)	44

== Thelma Houston version ==
"Don't Leave Me This Way"
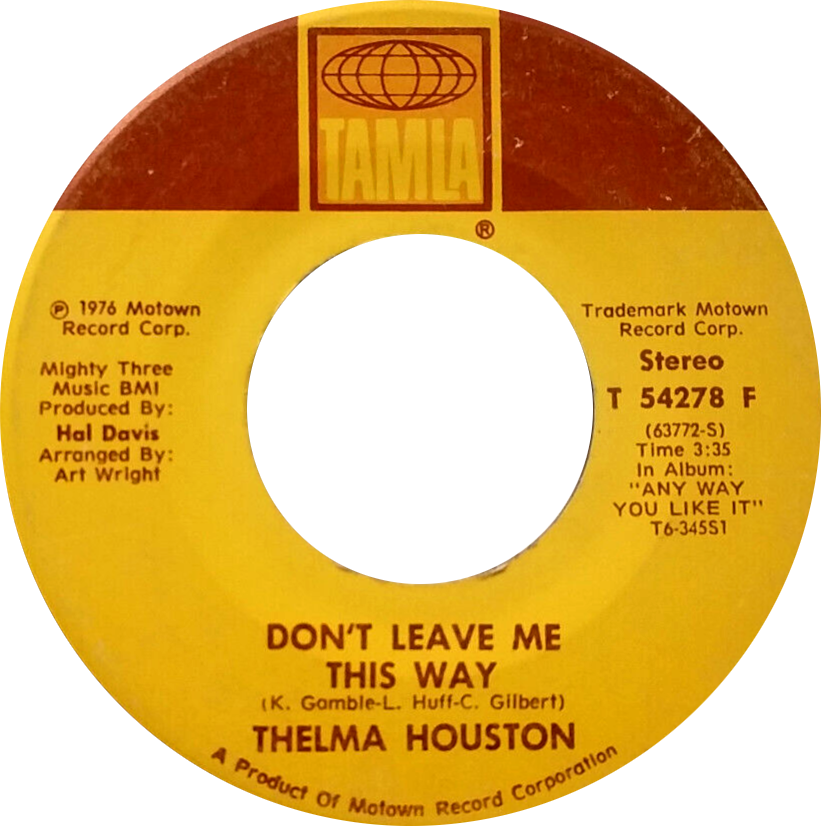
- A-side label of the US single

Single by Thelma Houston

from the album Any Way You Like It
- B-side: "Today Will Soon Be Yesterday"
- Released: December 2, 1976
- Studio: Motown Hollywood
- Genre: Disco
- Length: 5:42 (album version); 3:35 (radio edit)
- Label: Tamla
- Songwriters: Kenneth Gamble; Leon Huff; Cary Gilbert
- Producer: Hal Davis

Thelma Houston singles chronology
"You've Been Doing Wrong for So Long" (1976)	"Don't Leave Me This Way" (1976)	"If It's the Last Thing I Do" (1977)

"Don't Leave Me This Way" was covered by American singer Thelma Houston in 1976. Originally assigned to Diana Ross, it was intended to be the follow-up to her 1976 single "Love Hangover", but was given to Houston instead.

Following the release of Houston's fourth album, Any Way You Like It (1976), a Boston DJ record pool unanimously reported positive audience response to "Don't Leave Me This Way" in discothèques, and the song was selected for release as a single. Houston's version topped the US soul singles chart and, nine weeks later, the Billboard Hot 100 for one week in April 1977. The song peaked at number 13 in the UK. The song peaked at number 1 on the disco chart. Later in the year, it was featured on the soundtrack to the film Looking for Mr. Goodbar. In 1978, Houston won the award for Best R&B Vocal Performance, Female at the 20th Annual Grammy Awards for her rendition of the song.

=== Recording ===
Thelma Houston recorded her vocals at Motown's West Hollywood studio under producer Hal Davis; he aggressively compressed her voice and allowed a slight amount of distortion at the loudest peaks. The instrumental hook in the chorus and outro was supplied by bass guitarist Henry E. Davis, who performed with many passing notes and occasional disco-style octave jumps. Motown house drummer James Gadson provided a four-on-the-floor disco beat locking his kick with Davis's bass. Congas are present in the mix, and a booming floor tom is overdubbed into the chorus. A disco string section included violins, violas, cellos and harp. Arthur G. Wright arranged the strings, and played an out-of-tune electric guitar, while John Barnes played electric Rhodes piano—the Suitcase model with its stereo panning effect. Layered backing vocals were sung by the Waters Sisters, Maxine and Julia. A lengthy outro section introduced an active Clavinet funk line and tambourine.

=== Legacy ===
Houston's version was revived in 1995 in several remixes, which reached No. 19 on the US Billboard dance chart and No. 35 in the UK. This version got Houston ranked No. 86 on VH1's "100 Greatest One-Hit Wonders", as well as the number-two spot on their "100 Greatest Dance Songs" list in 2000. In 2012, Rolling Stone ranked it No. 8 in their list of "The Best Disco Songs of All Time". In 2020, Slant Magazine ranked it No. 8 in their "The 100 Best Dance Songs of All Time". In 2021, Rolling Stone included "Don't Leave Me This Way" in their list of "500 Best Songs of All Time" at No. 355, while in 2022, the magazine ranked it No. 121 in their "200 Greatest Dance Songs of All Time". In 2025, Billboard ranked it No. 55 and No. 19 in their lists of "The 100 Best Dance Songs of All Time" and "The 100 Greatest LGBTQ+ Anthems of All Time".

=== Charts ===
==== Weekly charts ====
Weekly chart performance for "Don't Leave Me This Way"
Chart (1976–1977)	Peak position
Australia (Kent Music Report)	6
Austria (Ö3 Austria Top 40)	18
Belgium (Ultratop 50 Flanders)	7
Belgium (Ultratop 50 Wallonia)	1
Canada Top Singles (RPM)	4
Finland (Suomen virallinen lista)	25
Italy (Musica e dischi)	15
Netherlands (Dutch Top 40)	4
Netherlands (Single Top 100)	4
New Zealand (Recorded Music NZ)	17
South Africa (Springbok Radio)	1
Spain (AFE)	11
Sweden (Sverigetopplistan)	4
UK Singles (Official Charts)	13
US Billboard Hot 100	1
US Adult Contemporary (Billboard)	40
US Dance Club Songs (Billboard) with "Any Way You Like It"	1
US Hot Soul Singles (Billboard)	1
US Cash Box Top 100	3
US Top 100 R&B (Cash Box)	1
West Germany (GfK)	5

Weekly chart performance for "Don't Leave Me This Way" (remix)
Chart (1995)	Peak position
Australia (ARIA)	83
Europe (European Dance Radio)	13
Scottish Singles Sales (Official Charts)	24
UK Singles (Official Charts)	35
UK Pop Tip Club Chart (Music Week)	4
US Dance Club Songs (Billboard)	19

==== Year-end charts ====
Year-end chart performance for "Don't Leave Me This Way"
Chart (1977)	Position
Australia (Kent Music Report)	21
Belgium (Ultratop 50 Flanders)	49
Canada Top Singles (RPM)	48
Netherlands (Dutch Top 40)	42
Netherlands (Single Top 100)	48
South Africa (Springbok Radio)	7
US Billboard Hot 100	7
US Disco Audience Response (Billboard)	1
US Hot Soul Singles (Billboard)	12
US Cash Box Top 100	17
US Top 100 R&B (Cash Box)	34
West Germany (GfK)	32

=== Certifications ===
Certifications for "Don't Leave Me This Way" by Thelma Houston
Region	Certification	Certified units/sales
Canada (Music Canada)	Gold	75,000^{^}
United Kingdom (BPI)	Silver	200,000^{‡}
^{^} Shipments figures based on certification alone.^{‡} Sales+streaming figures based on certification alone.

== The Communards version ==
"Don't Leave Me This Way"

Single by the Communards with Sarah Jane Morris

from the album Communards
- B-side: "Sanctified"
- Released: August 11, 1986
- Genre: Hi-NRG; disco
- Length: 4:50 (album version); 4:36 (single edit)
- Label: London
- Songwriters: Kenneth Gamble; Leon Huff; Cary Gilbert
- Producer: Mike Thorne

The Communards singles chronology
"Disenchanted" (1986)	"Don't Leave Me This Way" (1986)	"So Cold the Night" (1986)

Sarah Jane Morris singles chronology
"Don't Leave Me This Way" (1986)	"Can't Get to Sleep Without You" (1988)

In 1986, the song was covered by British synth-pop duo the Communards in a hi-NRG version. This recording topped the UK Singles Chart for four weeks in September 1986, becoming the best-selling single of the year in the United Kingdom. The featured guest vocalist was jazz singer Sarah Jane Morris. The song reached number 40 on the US Billboard Hot 100 and topped the Billboard dance chart. In 2015, the song was voted by the British public as the nation's 16th favorite 1980s number one in a poll for ITV.

The song also had a music video, which showed the band performing in an underground setting with many fans. This included a blond stoic young man as part of the crowd simply watching. In the video, it turns out that he was chased down and caught and forced to be an informant to secret police. Near the end of the video, he finally radios in to them, and at the end they turn spotlights on the band and the crowd, forcing them to scatter.

Several remixes were issued, notably the "Gotham City Mix" which was split across two sides of a 12-inch single and ran for a total of 22 minutes 55 seconds. The album liner notes dedicate the song to the Greater London Council (GLC), which had recently been abolished.

=== Critical reception ===
Much critical of the Communards' version, Simon Mills of Smash Hits stated that it "crucified" the original one "with stupid, blundering unsympathetic Hi-NRG synthesiser noises and that bloody ridiculous voice", adding that he did not like the song, the band or the single cover.

In the United States, Brian Chin of Billboard reviewed the single in his "Dance Trax" column, noting that it was the group's first US single after several UK releases and came "in two humongously long mixes". He wrote that it updated Thelma Houston's version "but has an almost identical hyperdrive energy". Writing in The Observer in 2009, in a series on 1,000 songs everyone must hear, a critic said the Communards' hi-NRG version "makes it clear that the song is as concerned with sexual satisfaction as it is with romance; perhaps more so." Reviewing the single in 2010 for the "Popular" column on Freaky Trigger, Tom Ewing gave it 5 out of 10. He wrote that the record's "odd grain" came from "the contrast between Somerville's slightly aloof, elevated performance and the gusto the arrangement seems to demand", called its hands-in-the-air "BABY!" "the least subtle moment all year", and said that "the sonics have aged terribly" and "it all sounds so thin now".

=== Charts ===
==== Weekly charts ====
Weekly chart performance for "Don't Leave Me This Way"
Chart (1986–1987)	Peak position
Australia (Kent Music Report)	2
Austria (Ö3 Austria Top 40)	19
Belgium (Ultratop 50 Flanders)	1
Europe (European Hot 100 Singles)	3
Finland (Suomen virallinen lista)	8
France (SNEP)	6
Ireland (IRMA)	1
Italy (Musica e dischi)	3
Netherlands (Dutch Top 40)	1
Netherlands (Single Top 100)	1
New Zealand (Recorded Music NZ)	2
Portugal (AFP)	2
South Africa (Springbok Radio)	3
Spain (AFYVE)	1
Switzerland (Schweizer Hitparade)	2
UK Singles (Official Charts)	1
US Billboard Hot 100	40
US 12-inch Singles Sales (Billboard)	3
US Dance/Disco Club Play (Billboard)	1
US Cash Box Top 100 Singles	55
West Germany (GfK)	5

==== Year-end charts ====
1986 year-end chart performance for "Don't Leave Me This Way"
Chart (1986)	Position
Australia (Kent Music Report)	17
Belgium (Ultratop 50 Flanders)	2
Europe (European Hot 100 Singles)	27
France (IFOP)	22
Netherlands (Dutch Top 40)	5
Netherlands (Single Top 100)	2
UK Singles (Gallup)	1
West Germany (Media Control)	71

1987 year-end chart performance for "Don't Leave Me This Way"
Chart (1987)	Position
Europe (European Hot 100 Singles)	50
Spain (AFYVE)	10
US 12-inch Singles Sales (Billboard)	28

=== Certifications ===
Certifications for "Don't Leave Me This Way" by the Communards with Sarah Jane Morris
Region	Certification	Certified units/sales
France (SNEP)	Silver	400,000
Netherlands (NVPI)	Platinum	100,000^{^}
Spain (Promusicae)	Gold	30,000^{‡}
United Kingdom (BPI)	Platinum	600,000^{‡}
^{^} Shipments figures based on certification alone.^{‡} Sales+streaming figures based on certification alone.
