= Welcoming a New Ice Age =

Studio album by Gleaming Spires
- Released: 1985
- Studio: Westlake; Track Record; Music Grinder, Melrose
- Genre: New wave
- Length: 42:11
- Label: Tabb
- Producer: Greg Penny

Gleaming Spires chronology
Walk on Well Lighted Streets (1983)	Welcoming a New Ice Age (1985)

Welcoming a New Ice Age is the third and final studio album by American new wave pop group Gleaming Spires. It was produced by Greg Penny.

== History ==
By 1985, bassist/lead vocalist Leslie Bohem and drummer David Kendrick's tenure in Sparks had begun to draw to a close. Starting with 1983's In Outer Space, the Mael brothers had started using the LinnDrum for demos, leading to simpler drum patterns that Kendrick would later add cymbals and hi-hats over. By 1986's Music That You Can Dance To, there was little to no involvement from any of their 1980s backing band, despite being credited on the album, and it ended up being the final Sparks album they were featured on in any capacity.

Cutting ties with Posh Boy, who released their previous two LPs, the Spires signed with Tabb Records, a Los Angeles-based indie label. In addition, Greg Penny, who would later produce the likes of Elton John and k.d. lang, was brought in as producer in place of Stephen Hague. Stylistically, the album was far more eclectic and experimental than their previous releases, stretching from the anthemic "big music" sound of opening track "Mercy," the mid-tempo balladry of "Tearaway" and "Unprotected," the country-tinged "Your Secret Room" and "Blowing Up My Life", and the Motown pastiche "Bigger Than Life", building on their new wave foundations. Like the previous two albums, the album's back cover features humorous riffs on the album title, including greeting the Mesozoic era, annihilating the Triassic period, walking on a well lit street, and get rich quick with the Gleaming Spires.

A planned US tour in support of the album was halted by the mysterious disappearance of guitarist Bob Haag shortly before the start of the tour, and the band dissolved shortly afterwards. Bohem later became a screenwriter for films such as Dante's Peak and Twenty Bucks; Kendrick later joined Devo for the albums Total Devo and Smooth Noodle Maps after the departure of previous drummer Alan Myers.

== Release ==
Welcoming a New Ice Age was originally released on vinyl in 1985 by Tabb Records. In 2021, the album was reissued on CD and to streaming services by Omnivore Recordings.

== Track listing ==
All tracks are written by Les Bohem and David Kendrick, except where noted.

Side one
No.	Title	Writer(s)	Length
1.	"Mercy"		3:51
2.	"Welcoming a New Ice Age"		4:24
3.	"Tearaway"	Les Bohem	4:39
4.	"No One Coming Over"	Les Bohem	2:33
5.	"Your Secret Room"	Les Bohem	3:45

Side two
No.	Title	Writer(s)	Length
1.	"Bigger Than Life"		3:10
2.	"The Things I Have Done to Our Love"		3:58
3.	"Blowing Up My Life"		3:46
4.	"What's Coming Next"		3:15
5.	"Unprotected"	Les Bohem	3:12
6.	"Harm"		5:38

== Personnel ==
Credits are adapted from the Welcoming a New Ice Age liner notes.

The Spires are:

- Leslie Bohem - lead vocals, bass, acoustic guitar, synthesizers
- David Kendrick - drums, percussion
- Bob Haag - guitars, background vocals
- Jimbo Goodwin - keyboards
- Greg Penny - synthesizers, guitars, background vocals, production

"The Horns of Desire":

- Bobby Moore - saxophone
- Dana Wylie - trumpets

"The Passionettes" - background vocals:

- Katia Empkowicz Penny, Patty Foley, Beau Wesley, The Happy Boy, The Party God, Fanny Penny

Plus:

- Jonathan Gold - cello
- Campbell Naismith - bagpipes on "Your Secret Room"
- Coolwhip - mixing
- Bill Allen - photography
- Bar fixtures: Endre Bohem, Peter Turner, Karen Smythe, Mr. Penguin, and Frank the Bartender
