= Two (Dubstar album) =

Studio album by Dubstar
- Released: 6 May 2022
- Genre: Synthpop
- Length: 1:35:26
- Label: Northern Writes
- Producer: Stephen Hague and Chris Wilkie

Dubstar chronology
One (2018)	Two (2022)

Singles from Two
- 1. "Hygiene Strip" Released: 21 January 2021; 2. "I Can See You Outside" Released: 30 April 2021; 3. "Tectonic Plates" Released: 22 October 2021; 4. "Token" Released: 02 February 2022; 5. "Tears" Released: 22 March 2022

Professional ratings
Review scores
Source	Rating
Louder Than War	4/5 stars
Albumism	5/5 stars

Two is the fifth studio album by British band Dubstar. It was released on 6 May 2022 on the Northern Writes label.

The album features Sarah Blackwood on vocals and Chris Wilkie on guitar, keyboards and programming. It was produced by Stephen Hague, who also plays bass and keyboards on the album. The first of five singles from the album was "Hygiene Strip", which is about the COVID-19 lockdown that was in place while the album was recorded. The album reached number 86 in the UK Albums Chart, which was the highest chart position for the group since the Goodbye album in 1997.

== Artwork ==
The cover of the album is a CGI render of the original Trinity Square car park in Gateshead city centre. The building was designed by Owen Luder and featured in the 1971 film Get Carter, but was demolished in 2010. In an interview with Quentin Harrison on Albumism, Sarah and Chris discussed their shared love of 1960s brutalist architecture.

== Reception ==
Louder Than War awarded the album with 4 out of 5 stars and in its review, Iain Key called it "a record of full-spectrum mega-pop, swooning synthesised orchestras, acutely observed kitchen sink dramas, and outright bangers". He also added that "Sarah’s deceptively sweet and unapologetically Northern delivery is still there".

In his review for Albumism, Quentin Harrison awarded the album with 5 out of 5 stars and described it as "a lean, masterful stroke of modern pop that stands on its own, but doesn’t disavow its link with what came before with Dubstar’s anterior efforts". He also added that "the standout for me throughout the album are Sarah's vocals".

== Track listing ==
All tracks written by Chris Wilkie and Sarah Blackwood except where noted.

1. "Token" (Chris Wilkie, Sarah Blackwood, Stephen Hague) – 4:27
2. "I Can See You Outside" (Wilkie, Blackwood, Hague) – 4:20
3. "Tectonic Plates" – 3:34
4. "Lighthouse" – 4:20
5. "Tears" – 3:12
6. "Hygiene Strip" (Wilkie, Blackwood, Hague) – 4:08
7. "Blood" – 3:51
8. "Social Proof" – 3:26
9. "Kissing To Be Unkind" – 4:38
10. "Perfect Circle" (Bill Berry, Michael Stipe, Mike Mills, Peter Buck) – 4:12

Bonus Remix CD

1. "Hygiene Strip (Extended)" – 7:08
2. "I Can See You Outside (Extended)" – 7:18
3. "Tectonic Plates (Extended)" – 6:28
4. "Token (Extended)" – 7:39
5. "Blood (Remix)" – 7:23
6. "I Can See You Outside (Bright Light Bright Light Remix)" – 4:14
7. "Tectonic Plates (Dressing Up Extended Mix)" – 6:37
8. "Token" (Widescreen) – 4:28
9. "I Can See You Outside (Widescreen)" – 4:11

== Personnel ==
- Sarah Blackwood – vocals
- Chris Wilkie – guitar, keyboards and programming
- Stephen Hague – keyboards, programming and bass
- Chuck Norman – additional programming on tracks 1, 2 and 6

Production and design

- Stephen Hague – producer
- Dick Beetham – engineer
- Dominic Foster – artwork

== Charts ==
=== Album charts ===
Chart (2025)	Peak position
UK Singles (OCC)	86
