= With All My Might (Sparks song) =

1984 song by Sparks

Single by Sparks

from the album Pulling Rabbits Out of a Hat
- B-side: "Sparks in the Dark"
- Released: 1984
- Studio: Oasis Studios (Los Angeles, California)
- Length: 3:40
- Label: Atlantic
- Songwriters: Ron Mael; Russell Mael
- Producer: Ian Little

Sparks singles chronology
"Please Baby, Please" (1983)	"With All My Might" (1984)	"Progress" (1984)

Music video
- "With All My Might" on YouTube

"With All My Might" is a song by American pop and rock duo Sparks, which was released in 1984 as the lead single from their thirteenth studio album Pulling Rabbits Out of a Hat (1984). The song was written by Ron Mael and Russell Mael, and produced by Ian Little. "With All My Might" failed to enter the U.S. Billboard Hot 100 but reached No. 4 on the Bubbling Under the Hot 100 chart.

== Background ==
"With All My Might" was an attempt by Sparks to write a song which was radio-friendly and would appeal to a mass audience. In a 1990 interview with Ira Robbins, Russell Mael said of the song, "We thought this could have been really successful commercially, but for whatever reasons it didn't get played a lot. Even the stations that would support us thought it was too soft-sounding. For once in our career, Ron tried to make a song acceptable for an American mass audience – not being overly clever, trying to make them real palatable." Ron Mael added, "We wanted to do a song that had all the irony removed and was just a 'song' song. I really like it, but people look for the motive behind it and then we can't get accepted. People are waiting for the punchline, and there isn't any."

== Music video ==
The song's music video was directed by Graeme Whifler and features Sparks as cowboys. Before "With All My Might" was settled on as the album's first single, the Mael brothers had already decided that their next video would feature them horse riding, regardless of the song's subject. Whifler told the Los Angeles Times in 1984 about the shoot, "We filmed the guys on horses, the bird flying by and the campfire scene in front of a blue screen and then filmed the painted backdrops separately, so it's basically two different films edited together." He added, "We also used a snorkel lens, functioning as a periscope, [which] allows you to bring the camera right down to the level of the miniature set that you want to shoot from." In 1990, Russell Mael recalled, "It [was] a real nice video, a fantasy western motif with us rocking on two real fake horses. [It] went counter to the song's seriousness."

== Critical reception ==
On its release, Billboard described the song as "decidedly loopy midtempo pop". Cash Box wrote, "With characteristic Sparks intensity, the brothers wax melodic on 'With All My Might,' blending a fluid harmonic backing with beat-heavy percussion. Russell Mael's atonally-edged vocal is in top form as it charges this tune with vibrancy."

== Track listing ==
7–inch single

1. "With All My Might" – 3:41
2. "Sparks in the Dark" – 3:52

7–inch single (US promo)

1. "With All My Might" – 3:41
2. "With All My Might" – 3:41

12–inch single (US promo)

1. "With All My Might" – 3:41
2. "With All My Might" – 3:41

== Personnel ==
Sparks

- Russell Mael – vocals
- Ron Mael – synthesizers

Additional musicians

- Bob Haag – guitar
- Leslie Bohem – bass
- David Kendrick – drums

Production and artwork

- Ian Little – producer
- Steve Bates – engineer
- Jim Shea – photography
- Larry Vigon – design

== Charts ==
Chart (1984)	Peak position
US Billboard Bubbling Under the Hot 100	4
