= In Outer Space =

Studio album by Sparks
- Released: April 1983
- Studio: Synsound Studios (Brussels)
- Genres: New wave; synth-pop
- Length: 36:37; 40:24 (France)
- Label: Atlantic
- Producers: Ron Mael; Russell Mael

Sparks chronology
Angst in My Pants (1982)	In Outer Space (1983)	Pulling Rabbits Out of a Hat (1984)

Singles from In Outer Space
- 1. "Cool Places" Released: March 1983; 2. "All You Ever Think About Is Sex" Released: July 1983

In Outer Space is the twelfth studio album by American pop duo Sparks, released in April 1983 by Atlantic Records. Brothers Ron and Russell Mael of Sparks self-produced the album.

== History and release ==
By 1982, Sparks had begun to gain momentum in the American charts with the release of Whomp That Sucker (1981) and Angst in My Pants (1982), the latter from which the single "I Predict" was their first to enter the Billboard Hot 100, peaking at No. 60.

In anticipation of In Outer Space, "Cool Places" was released as the first single from the album in March 1983, reaching No. 49 on the Billboard Hot 100. The song was a duet with the Go-Go's rhythm guitarist and backing vocalist Jane Wiedlin. Wiedlin's band was very popular at the time, and her input gave exposure to the single, which led it to become Sparks' biggest hit in the US. "Cool Places" was extended for 12", and both formats were backed with the non-album track "Sports." The single also became the first of many entries for the band on the Billboard Hot Dance Music/Club Play chart where it peaked at No. 13. According to magazine Cash Box in April 2, 1983, "new music-oriented radio has already reacted positively" to "Cool Places," while stating that In Outer Space "may be the group's most accessible recording since 1981's outrageous Whomp That Sucker."

In Outer Space became one of Sparks' most successful albums in the U.S., peaking at No. 88 on the Billboard 200 albums chart and building upon the success of the band's previous two studio albums, Whomp That Sucker and Angst in My Pants. In France, the 1982 non-album single "Modesty Plays" (originally conceived for the TV series Modesty Blaise) was added and included as the final track.

The album track "All You Ever Think About Is Sex" was remixed and released as the follow-up single with "Dance Godammit" as its B-side, but it did not chart. An extended mix was also produced, and it was backed with a remixed version of the album track. Despite the success in the U.S., neither the album nor the accompanying singles were successful in the U.K.

== Critical reception ==
Professional ratings
Review scores
Source	Rating
AllMusic	4/5 stars
Sounds	1/5 stars

Contemporary assessments of In Outer Space were mixed. Reviewing for the Santa Cruz Sentinel, Tom Long said that while it "isn't their best album, ... it's awfully representative of their work and a lot of fun to listen to, especially if you've got a strange sense of humor." In contrast, in a one star review in Sounds, Dave Henderson found In Outer Space "inevitably tedious," adding "the coy campiness of their presentation and repetition of their initial idea has been overworked far too much."

Retrospectively, Dave Thompson of AllMusic said that despite "the quickly dated framework of the album's production, the tunes bristle with a locomotive curiosity"; reflecting upon the legacy of "Cool Places" and In Outer Space and the success it spawned, Thompson suggested that in this brief period for Sparks, "an entire generation of new fans arose."

== Track listing ==
All tracks are written by Ron Mael and Russell Mael.

Side one
No.	Title	Length
1.	"Cool Places" (with Jane Wiedlin)	3:23
2.	"Popularity"	3:52
3.	"Prayin' for a Party"	2:59
4.	"All You Ever Think About Is Sex"	4:09
5.	"Please, Baby, Please"	3:42

Side two
No.	Title	Length
6.	"Rockin' Girls"	4:42
7.	"I Wish I Looked a Little Better"	2:58
8.	"Lucky Me, Lucky You" (with Jane Wiedlin)	3:26
9.	"A Fun Bunch of Guys from Outer Space"	4:00
10.	"Dance Godammit"	3:26
Total length:		36:37

French editions bonus track
No.	Title	Length
11.	"Modesty Plays" (Originally released in Germany, 1982)	3:47
Total length:		40:24

Imperial Records (Japan) bonus tracks (2009)
No.	Title	Length
11.	"Miniskirted" (From the film Where the Boys Are '84)	3:47
12.	"All You Ever Think About Is Sex" (Unreleased Alternate Version)	4:06
13.	"Sports" (B-side of "Cool Places")	3:23
Total length:		47:53

Repertoire Records bonus tracks (2013)
No.	Title	Length
11.	"All You Ever Think About Is Sex" (Single version – Remixed by Brian Reeves)	3:32
12.	"Sports" (B-side of "Cool Places")	3:23
13.	"Cool Places" (12" mix)	4:40
14.	"All You Ever Think About Is Sex" (12" club version – Remixed by Brian Reeves)	5:06
15.	"Dance Godammit" (12" club version – Remixed by Brian Reeves)	3:59
Total length:		57:17

== Personnel ==
Credits are adapted from the In Outer Space liner notes.

Sparks

- Russell Mael – vocals
- Ron Mael – all synthesizers (Roland JP-8)

Additional musicians

- Bob Haag – Endodyne guitars and Roland guitar synthesizers, Tab cans, backing vocals; additional bass guitar
- Leslie Bohem – bass guitar, backing vocals
- David Kendrick – drums
- James Goodwin – additional concert keyboards
- Jane Wiedlin – guest vocals on "Cool Places" and "Lucky Me, Lucky You"

Production and artwork

- Ron Mael – production, cover concept
- Russell Mael – production
- Dan Lacksman – engineering except "Cool Places" and "Lucky Me, Lucky You"
- Brian Reeves – mixing, engineering for "Cool Places" and "Lucky Me, Lucky You"
- Marc Moulin – album coordination
- Larry Vigon – art direction and design
- Jim Shea – photography

== Charts ==
In Outer Space
Chart (1983)	Peak position
US Billboard 200	88
US Top Rock Albums (Billboard)	49

"Cool Places" with Jane Wiedlin
Chart (1983)	Peak position
US Billboard Hot 100	49
US Dance Club Songs (Billboard)	13
