= I Predict =

Single by Sparks

from the album Angst in My Pants
- B-side: "Moustache"
- Released: 1982
- Genre: New wave
- Length: 2:56
- Label: Atlantic
- Songwriters: Ron Mael; Russell Mael
- Producer: Mack

Sparks singles chronology
"Funny Face" (1981)	"I Predict" (1982)	"Cool Places" (1983)

Music video
- "I Predict" on YouTube

"I Predict" is a song by American new wave duo Sparks. It was released in 1982 as the first single from their eleventh studio album Angst in My Pants, although an effort was made to release "Eaten by the Monster of Love" as a second single. The group promoted the single with an eclectic performance on Saturday Night Live (SNL). They also performed "Mickey Mouse", another Angst in My Pants track. It was their first single to ever enter the Billboard Hot 100 charts in America.

== Music video ==
A music video made to accompany the single featured Ron Mael in drag doing a striptease dance performance in a Los Angeles nightclub while Russell lip syncs the lyrics to the song. The music video is sometimes erroneously credited to David Lynch, but the book Talent is an Asset: The Story of Sparks credits the video to be done by Steve and Doug Martin in the style of Lynch.

Due to the more "mature and inappropriate sexual themes" and "adult nature" of the video, MTV usually only played it during nightly hours or at midnight.

== Track listing ==
7" vinyl (US, Atlantic 4030)

1. "I Predict" – 2:56
2. "Moustache" – 3:32

12" vinyl promo (US, Atlantic DMD 325)

1. "I Predict" – 2:56
2. "I Predict" (club mix) – 6:19

12" vinyl (France, Underdog 8159)

1. "I Predict" (club mix) – 6:19
2. "Moustache" – 3:32

== Personnel ==
Sparks

- Russell Mael – vocals
- Ron Mael – keyboards and synthesizers

Additional musicians

- Leslie Bohem – bass guitar and additional background vocals
- Bob Haag – guitar and additional background vocals
- David Kendrick – drums
- James Goodwin – synthesizers
- Mack – synthesizer programming

== Charts ==
Chart (1982)	Peak position
US Billboard Hot 100	60
