= Walk on Well Lighted Streets =

Studio album by Gleaming Spires
- Released: 1983
- Studio: Brian Elliot Studios, North Hollywood, California
- Genre: New wave
- Length: 34:45
- Label: Posh Boy
- Producer: Stephen Hague

Gleaming Spires chronology
Songs of the Spires (1981)	Walk on Well Lighted Streets (1983)	Welcoming a New Ice Age (1985)

Walk on Well Lighted Streets is the second studio album by American new wave pop group Gleaming Spires. Like their debut, Songs of the Spires, the album was produced by Stephen Hague.

== History ==
In addition to the core duo of bassist/lead vocalist Leslie Bohem and drummer David Kendrick, the Spires lineup was augmented on this album (as well as their previous release, 1982's Life Out on the Lawn EP) to include guitarist Bob Haag and keyboardist Jim "Jimbo" Goodwin, all of whom recorded and toured with Sparks during this time. As a result, unlike the rough demo recordings of the previous album, Walk on Well Lighted Streets features a full band arrangement and a more distinctive "new wave" sound. The album has been described as featuring music that "manages to be simultaneously catchy and quirky," with lyrics "more bizarre than ever."

A music video was created for the song "A Christian Girl's Problems," featuring the band members dressed in Roman gladiator outfits running in place against a chroma-keyed backdrop. The front cover painting, "Bed of Nails," was painted by Mark Kostabi. The back cover features photographs of the band members bordered by humorous variations of the album title, including promenade down cool shady lanes, tromp down brightly illuminated sidewalks, and come over to my house for a sandwich.

== Release ==
Walk on Well Lighted Streets was originally released on vinyl in 1983 by Posh Boy Records. In 2021, the album was reissued on CD and to streaming services by Omnivore Recordings.

== Track listing ==
All tracks are written by Les Bohem and David Kendrick, except where noted.

Side one
No.	Title	Writer(s)	Length
1.	"Mining"		4:09
2.	"You're Right"	Les Bohem	3:54
3.	"Big Surprise"		3:48
4.	"Walk on Well Lighted Streets"	Les Bohem	4:54
5.	"Fun Type"		2:32

Side two
No.	Title	Writer(s)	Length
6.	"A Christian Girl's Problems"		3:41
7.	"Happy Boy"	Les Bohem	3:51
8.	"At Together"	Les Bohem, Stephen Hague	3:52
9.	"The Making Love Project"	Les Bohem	4:02
10.	"Yes I Can"		3:53

== Bonus tracks ==
In 2021, Omnivore Recordings released a CD of the album (OVCD-445) with the following bonus tracks:

No.	Title	Writer(s)	Length
1.	"Funk For Children"
2.	"Does Your Mother Know?"	Benny Andersson, Björn Ulvaeus
3.	"Christine"	Derv Gordon
4.	"Brain Button"
5.	"Funk For Children (Part II)"
6.	"Brain Button (Part II)"
7.	"It's Kinda Like The Movies"
8.	"Are You Ready For The Sex Girls? (Full Band Version)"
9.	"All Night Party"

== Personnel ==
Credits are adopted from the Walk on Well Lighted Streets liner notes.

- Leslie Bohem - lead vocals, bass guitar
- David Kendrick - drums, percussion
- Bob Haag - guitar
- Jimbo Goodwin - keyboards
- Stephen Hague - additional synthesizers, guitar, bass, production, engineering
- Paul Cutler - additional guitar
- Mark Kostabi - front cover painting
- Beth Herzhaft - photography
- The Bunker Enterprises - graphics
