= One (Dubstar album) =

Studio album by Dubstar
- Released: 12 Oct 2018
- Genre: Synthpop
- Length: 47:45
- Label: Northern Writes
- Producer: Youth

Dubstar chronology
Stars: The Best of Dubstar (2004)	One (2018)	Two (2022)

Singles from One
- 1. "Waltz No. 9" Released: 1 June 2018; 2. "You Were Never in Love" Released: 8 June 2018; 3. "Love Comes Late" Released: 27 July 2018

Professional ratings
Review scores
Source	Rating
Classic Pop	4/5 stars
Albumism	5/5 stars

One is the fourth studio album by British band Dubstar. It was released on 12 October 2018 on the Northern Writes label.

The album was the first studio recording by the band since Make It Better in 2000. It features Sarah Blackwood on vocals and Chris Wilkie on guitars and programming. In an interview with Quentin Harrison for Albumism magazine, Sarah and Chris discussed the background to the recording and their decision to work with the producer Youth (Martin Glover). Three tracks from the album were released as singles.

== Reception ==
Classic Pop awarded the album with 4 out of 5 stars. In its review by Wyndham Wallace, he described the sound of the group after 18 years as mature and "more organic" with its use of acoustic guitar on tracks such as "Please Stop Leaving Me Alone". But he also added that "the dark lyrical shadows of earlier work remain intact" in songs such as "Waltz No. 9".

Albumism awarded the album with 5 out of 5 stars. In its review by Quentin Harrison, he described the album as "accomplished" and stated that "One makes it seem as if 18 years has never passed between Dubstar’s third and fourth projects". He also paid a particular compliment to Sarah Blackwood's vocals and stated that "her instrument has not aged whatsoever".

== Track listing ==
All tracks written by Chris Wilkie and Sarah Blackwood except where noted.

1. "Love Comes Late" – 4:48
2. "Love Gathers" – 4:28
3. "Torched" – 5:09
4. "Please Stop Leaving Me Alone" – 4:16
5. "I Hold Your Heart" – 5:07
6. "Waltz No. 9" – 3:53
7. "You Were Never In Love" – 4:36
8. "Locked Inside" – 5:52
9. "Why Don't You Kiss Me" – 3:12
10. "Mantra" (Chris Wilkie, Sarah Blackwood, Martin Glover) – 6:32

== Personnel ==
- Sarah Blackwood – vocals
- Chris Wilkie – guitars and programming
- Youth – bass guitar and Fender VI (tracks 2, 3, 4, 5, 6, 7 and 10)
- Michael Rendell – drum programming, synthesizer, string synthesizer, Wurlitzer, piano, trumpet, Fender Rhodes, Vox Continental and additional keyboards

Production and design

- Youth – producer
- Michael Rendell – engineer
- Robin Schmidt – mastering
- Andy Earl – photography
