= Pulling Rabbits Out of a Hat =

Studio album by Sparks
- Released: June 1984
- Studios: Oasis Studios (Los Angeles, California)
- Genres: Synth-pop; new wave
- Length: 39:47
- Label: Atlantic
- Producer: Ian Little

Sparks chronology
In Outer Space (1983)	Pulling Rabbits Out of a Hat (1984)	Music That You Can Dance To (1986)

Singles from Pulling Rabbits Out of a Hat
- 1. "With All My Might" Released: June 1984; 2. "Pretending to Be Drunk" Released: 1984; 3. "Progress" Released: 1984

Professional ratings
Review scores
Source	Rating
AllMusic	2/5 stars

Pulling Rabbits Out of a Hat is the thirteenth studio album by American pop and rock duo Sparks, released in June 1984 by Atlantic Records. It was not very well received and failed to capitalise on the commercial success of their previous studio album In Outer Space (1983). The album developed the light synth-pop sound of In Outer Space but with slightly darker lyrics revolving around Ron Mael's favourite subject matter: relationships.

== Release ==
Pulling Rabbits Out of a Hat didn't make the U.S. Billboard 200. However, it did chart at No. 202 on the Billboard Bubbling Under the Top Pop Albums chart, which was considered disappointing given the popularity of their previous studio album In Outer Space (1983). In the UK, where the duo hadn't charted since 1979, the album was also unsuccessful.

Three singles were lifted from the album. The lead single, "With All My Might", reached No. 104 on Bubbling Under Hot 100 Singles and made the Billboard Hot Dance Music/Club Play chart, where it peaked at No. 28.

== Track listing ==
All tracks are written by Ron Mael and Russell Mael.

Side one
No.	Title	Length
1.	"Pulling Rabbits Out of a Hat"	4:07
2.	"Love Scenes"	4:20
3.	"Pretending to Be Drunk"	3:38
4.	"Progress"	4:43
5.	"With All My Might"	4:06

Side two
No.	Title	Length
6.	"Sparks in the Dark (Part One)"	0:28
7.	"Everybody Move"	2:58
8.	"A Song That Sings Itself"	4:29
9.	"Sisters"	3:53
10.	"Kiss Me Quick"	4:07
11.	"Sparks in the Dark (Part Two)"	2:58
Total length:		39:47

Repertoire Records bonus tracks (2013)
No.	Title	Length
12.	"Sparks in the Dark" (Extended Club Mix)	3:57
13.	"Pretending to Be Drunk" (Extended Version)	5:39
14.	"Progress" (Extended Club Mix)	6:15
15.	"With All My Might" (Extended Club Mix)	6:40
16.	"Kiss Me Quick" (Extended Version)	5:39
Total length:		67:57

== Personnel ==
Credits are adapted from the Pulling Rabbits Out of a Hat liner notes.

Sparks

- Ron Mael – synthesizers (Roland JP-8, Yamaha DX7, Fairlight CMI)
- Russell Mael – vocals

Additional musicians

- Bob Haag – Endodyne guitars, Roland guitar synthesizers, backing vocals
- Leslie Bohem – bass, backing vocals
- David Kendrick – drums
- John Thomas – additional concert keyboards

Production and design

- Ian Little – production
- Steve Bates – engineering
- Brian Reeves, Dave Bianco, Mick Guzauski – mixing
- Ron Mael – cover concept
- Stan Watts – cover illustration
- Larry Vigon – art direction and design
- Jim Shea – photography
- Burt Hülpüsch – re-design

== Charts ==
=== Album ===
Chart (1984)	Peak position
US Billboard Bubbling Under the Top LPs	202

=== Singles ===
"With All My Might"
Chart (1984)	Peak position
US Bubbling Under Hot 100 Singles (Billboard)	104

"Progress" / "With All My Might"
Chart (1984)	Peak position
US Dance Club Songs (Billboard)	28

"Pretending to Be Drunk" / "Kiss Me Quick"
Chart (1984)	Peak position
US Dance Club Songs (Billboard)	60
