= Maybe Someday =

Maybe Someday may refer to:

- "Maybe Someday", a song by Simply Red from their 1987 album Men and Women
- "Maybe Someday", a 2004 single by the Ordinary Boys
- "Maybe Someday", a promo-only single from the Cure from their 2000 album Bloodflowers
- "Maybe Someday", a song by the Incredible String Band from their 1966 album The Incredible String Band
- "Maybe Someday", a song by Bob Dylan from his 1986 album Knocked Out Loaded
- "Maybe Someday", a song by Loverboy from their 1997 album Six
- "Maybe Someday", a song by Black Stone Cherry from their 2006 album Black Stone Cherry
- "Maybe Someday", a song by the Cinematics from their 2007 album A Strange Education

== See also ==
- Someday Maybe, a 1996 album by the Clarks
