= Goodbye (Dubstar album) =

Dubstar album

Studio album by Dubstar
- Released: 22 September 1997
- Genre: Synthpop
- Label: Food
- Producer: Stephen Hague

Dubstar chronology
| Disgraceful (1995) | Goodbye (1997) | Make It Better (2000) |

Alternative cover
- Japanese cover

Professional ratings
Review scores
| Source | Rating |
|---|---|
| AllMusic | 4.5/5 stars |
| Music Week | 4/5 stars |
| NME | 6/10 |
| Pitchfork Media | (8.1/10) |
| Uncut | 4/5 stars |

Goodbye is Dubstar's second album. It was released in September 1997 on the Food Records label, a division of EMI that was also home to Blur.

== Track listing ==
All songs written by Steve Hillier except where noted.

1. "I Will Be Your Girlfriend" (Hillier, Chris Wilkie) - 3:37
2. "Inside" - 3:44
3. "No More Talk" - 3:39
4. "Polestar" - 3:40
5. "Say the Worst Thing First" - 4:07
6. "Cathedral Park" - 3:14
7. "It's Over" - 4:18
8. "The View From Here" - 3:42
9. "My Start in Wallsend" - 4:29
10. "It's Clear" (Hillier, Wilkie) - 2:22
11. "Ghost" - 3:36
12. "Can't Tell Me" - 3:21
13. "Wearchest" (Hillier, Wilkie) - 3:15
14. "When You Say Goodbye" (Sarah Blackwood, Hillier, Wilkie) - 3:14
15. "Let's Go" - 4:20

=== Japan bonus tracks ===
The Japanese release includes the B-sides from lead single "No More Talk" as bonus tracks.

== Personnel ==
- Sarah Blackwood, lead vocalist
- Steve Hillier, songwriting & programming
- Chris Wilkie, guitarist

Additional personnel

- Paul Wadsworth - drums
- Audrey Riley – cello
- Phil Spalding – bass

=== U.S. release ===
Goodbye was the band's first album released in the U.S. For this American edition, six songs were removed from the UK version and replaced with tracks from their previous UK release, Disgraceful. The rearranged track listing includes "Stars" and "Not So Manic Now," the most popular singles from Disgraceful, as well as some of their remixes.

All songs written by Steve Hillier except where otherwise noted. Songs not on UK release are noted in italics.

1. "Stars"
2. "Inside"
3. "Cathedral Park"
4. "Just a Girl She Said" (Sarah Blackwood, Steve Hillier, Chris Wilkie)
5. "The View From Here"
6. "It's Clear" (Hillier, Wilkie)
7. "No More Talk"
8. "Anywhere" (Hillier, Wilkie)
9. "Ghost"
10. "Can't Tell Me" (Wilkie)
11. "I Will Be Your Girlfriend" (Hillier, Wilkie)
12. "Wearchest" (Hillier, Wilkie)
13. "St. Swithin's Day" (Billy Bragg)
14. "Not So Manic Now" (Dave Harling, Jon Kirby, Martin Mason, Graeme Robinson)
15. "Stars" (Motiv 8 mix)
16. "Not So Manic Now" (Way Out West mix)
17. "Stars" (Way Out West mix)

== Singles ==
The following singles were released from the album, in order of release date. All songs written by Steve Hillier except where otherwise noted:

- "No More Talk"

- CD 1

1. "Unchained Monologue" (Hillier/Wilkie)
2. "La Boheme" (Charles Aznavour)
3. "Goodbye" (Blackwood/Hillier/Wilkie)

- CD 2

1. "Stars" (acoustic) (Hillier)
2. "Elevator song" (acoustic) (Hillier)
3. "Not Once Not Ever" (acoustic) (Hillier)
- "Cathedral Park"
1. "Let Down" (Wilkie)
2. "This Is My Home" (Hillier)
3. "In My Defence" (Hillier)
- "I Will Be Your Girlfriend"
1. "Not So Manic Now" (Dave Harling, Jon Kirby, Martin Mason, Graeme Robinson)
2. "Stars" (Hillier)
3. "Anywhere" (Hillier/Wilkie)

All songs are identical to the versions previously released as singles and on the album Disgraceful.
