= Songs of the Spires =

Studio album by Gleaming Spires
- Released: 1981
- Recorded: 1980–1981
- Genre: New wave
- Length: 35:27
- Label: Posh Boy Records
- Producer: Stephen Hague

Gleaming Spires chronology
Songs of the Spires (1981)	Walk on Well Lighted Streets (1983)

Songs of the Spires is the debut album by American new wave pop group Gleaming Spires. It features the single "Are You Ready for the Sex Girls?" and was produced by Stephen Hague.

== History ==
Gleaming Spires began as a side project of Leslie Bohem and David Kendrick. In 1980, they were enlisted as the bassist and drummer, respectively, for the art pop band Sparks, consisting of brothers Ron and Russell Mael. While in Sparks, Bohem and Kendrick convened with producer Stephen Hague to record a series of demos. The demo tape made its way to K-ROQ in Los Angeles, and according to Kendrick, when Posh Boy founder Robbie Fields heard the tape, he decided to release the songs as they were; the Songs of the Spires album consists of these demos.

While the Spires themselves originally did not want it released as a single, "Are You Ready for the Sex Girls?" went on to become the band's only hit. A music video was created for the song, featuring Bohem and Kendrick making coffee and baking a lemon meringue pie, as well as for "How to Get Girls Thru Hypnotism," featuring Bohem's head being shaved. For the former, Kendrick observed that "one could easily make the worst contrived, hackneyed, sexist, insulting, exploitative and ridiculous video in the world to 'Sex Girls,' so why not leave sex and girls out altogether[?] Some people got it I hope." "Sex Girls" later saw renewed popularity when it appeared in the 1984 film Revenge of the Nerds. Unlike the film, the accompanying soundtrack album featured the later re-recording of the song.

The tongue-in-cheek liner notes were written by the Mael brothers. Russell Mael praises the album's virtues despite "not personally [having had] the time to listen to [the album]", and Ron Mael facetiously calls it "the best Gleaming Spires album ... ever."

== Release ==
Songs of the Spires was originally released on vinyl in 1981 by Posh Boy Records. In 2015, the album was reissued on vinyl by Futurismo, and again in 2021 for CD and streaming by Omnivore Recordings.

== Track listing ==
All tracks are written by Les Bohem and David Kendrick, except where noted.

Side one
No.	Title	Writer(s)	Length
1.	"Going Hey Hey"		3:14
2.	"Are You Ready for the Sex Girls?"		4:01
3.	"While We Can"	Les Bohem	4:21
4.	"When Love Goes Under Glass"		3:12
5.	"The End of All Good Things"		3:30

Side two
No.	Title	Writer(s)	Length
6.	"Watch Your Blood Beat"		4:49
7.	"How to Get Girls Thru Hypnotism"	Les Bohem	5:36
8.	"Talking in the Dark"	Les Bohem	3:14
9.	"Big Hotels"		3:30

== Personnel ==
Credits adopted from the Songs of the Spires liner notes.

- Leslie Bohem - vocals, bass guitar, acoustic guitar, synthesizers
- David Kendrick - drums, percussion
- S.R. Jade - "vocal harangue" on "How to Get Girls Thru Hypnotism"
- Stephen Hague - producer
- The Bunker Ent. - graphics
- Kevin J. Walker - cover art illustration
- Russell Mael, Ron Mael - liner notes
