= Whomp That Sucker =

Studio album by Sparks
- Released: July 3, 1981
- Recorded: 1980
- Studio: Musicland (Munich)
- Genre: Rock; new wave
- Length: 38:38
- Label: RCA (US); Why-Fi (UK)
- Producer: Mack for Giorgio Moroder Enterprises, Ltd

Sparks chronology
Terminal Jive (1980)	Whomp That Sucker (1981)	Angst in My Pants (1982)

Singles from Whomp That Sucker
- 1. "Tips for Teens" Released: May 1981; 2. "Funny Face" Released: September 1981

Whomp That Sucker is the tenth studio album by the American rock band Sparks, released in 1981. The album marked Sparks' return to a rock sound after their previous two disco efforts.

== History ==
Sparks had recorded No. 1 In Heaven and Terminal Jive with Giorgio Moroder. Both had been relatively successful, but the brothers had found the electronic equipment they had adopted for their new sound too cumbersome to tour with. Whomp That Sucker was consequently recorded without Giorgio Moroder at Musicland Studios, Munich but still in association with Giorgio Moroder Enterprises. The next four albums were recorded as part of the same partnership. The producer for the album was Mack, who had recently produced Queen's album The Game.

To complement the Mael Brothers, the backing band Bates Motel was hired, consisting of guitarist Bob Haag, bassist Leslie Bohem, and drummer David Kendrick; this line-up would record the next four Sparks albums concluding with Music That You Can Dance To in 1986. In a 2014 interview for Dangerous Minds, Leslie Bohem explains how Sparks met them:

I had been going to the Belgian Waffle stand at the Farmer’s Market on Fairfax for years to have coffee. ... Then, in the Bates days, a whole bunch of us would go in the afternoons and we would see Ron and Russell, who hung out there most afternoons. ... After a while, we developed one of those nodding relationships. One day, I went over to their table. We were trying everything to get signed and I thought that maybe they’d produce us. I said, “You guys are supposed to be the fathers of New Wave, how about you come see your kids,” or something equally lame and gave them a flyer to a show we were doing at Blackies, a club in Santa Monica. They came. They did not want to produce us. They asked us to be their band.

Haag, Bohem, and Kendrick concurrently recorded on their own under the name Gleaming Spires, making three studio albums in the 1980s and having a minor radio new wave hit, "Are You Ready for the Sex Girls?", in 1981.

== Release ==
Professional ratings
Review scores
Source	Rating
All Music Guide	2/5 stars
AllMusic	(Note: The All Music Guide book rating of two stars was ported over to the AllMusic website by 2012. Raggett's review on the website included the 2-star rating until it was upgraded to 3.5 stars without changing Raggett's text sometime between 2017 and 2019.)
The Encyclopedia of Popular Music	2/5 stars
Record Mirror (1981)	5/5 stars
Rolling Stone (1981)	(Note: Although the online copy of the album review lists the rating as four stars out of five, the original physical print of the edition of Rolling Stone gave Whomp That Sucker three-and-a-half stars.)

Whomp That Sucker was released by a number of different record labels: RCA in the US, Underdog in France, Ariola/Oasis in Germany and in the UK by the short-lived Why-Fi Records. The album was not a success in the UK but did fairly well in France coming as it did off the back of their 1980 French hit "When I'm with You". In the US the album reached No. 182 on the Billboard 200, becoming their first since Indiscreet to chart there.

"Tips for Teens" and "Funny Face" were released as singles. In France "Funny Face" was the lead single, whereas in the UK "Tips for Teens" was chosen as the lead single with "Don't Shoot Me" as the B-side.

== Track listing ==
All tracks are written by Ron Mael and Russell Mael.

Side one
No.	Title	Length
1.	"Tips for Teens"	3:33
2.	"Funny Face"	3:24
3.	"Where's My Girl"	3:14
4.	"Upstairs"	3:40
5.	"I Married a Martian"	5:12

Side two
No.	Title	Length
6.	"The Willys"	3:58
7.	"Don't Shoot Me"	3:56
8.	"Suzie Safety"	3:57
9.	"That's Not Nastassia"	4:57
10.	"Wacky Women"	2:47
Total length:		38:38

Imperial Records (Japan) bonus tracks (2009)
No.	Title	Length
11.	"Love Can Conquer All" (Metallic Clang version)	4:27
12.	"The Oblongs"	0:59
13.	"Love Can Conquer All" (Smooth version)	4:34
Total length:		48:38

== Charts ==
Whomp That Sucker
Chart (1981)	Peak position
US Billboard 200	182

== Personnel ==
- Russell Mael - vocals
- Ron Mael - keyboards and synthesizers (Yamaha CS80, Polymoog, Roland JP4, Yamaha Grand, Wurlitzer Electric), cover concept
- Leslie Bohem - bass guitar and additional background vocals
- Bob Haag - guitar and additional background vocals
- David Kendrick - drums
- Mack - synthesizer programming, glass shattering, production, engineering
