= Modesty Blaise (1982 film) =

1982 American television pilot

- Genre: Action; Crime; Drama
- Written by: Stephen Zito; Peter O'Donnell (Characters)
- Directed by: Reza Badiyi
- Starring: Ann Turkel
- Theme music composer: Sparks
- Opening theme: "Modesty Blaise"
- Composers: Kevin Knelman; Paul Zaza
- Country of origin: United States
- Original language: English

Production
- Executive producer: Barney Rosenzweig
- Cinematography: Michael D. Margulies
- Editor: Stanford C. Allen
- Running time: 50 minutes
- Production companies: Barney Rosenzweig Productions; Paramount Television

Original release
- Network: ABC
- Release: 1982

Related
- My Name Is Modesty

Modesty Blaise was a 1982 American-produced one-hour television pilot produced for the ABC Network and based upon the comic strip Modesty Blaise, created by Peter O'Donnell.

This was the second attempt at adapting the comic strip as a live-action production, following a 1966 film of the same title. It was written by Stephen Zito, directed by Reza Badigi, with Barney Rosenzweig as executive producer. The plot has a few elements taken from O'Donnell's first Modesty Blaise novel (which in turn had been a novelization of a practically unused screenplay that Peter O'Donnell had written for the first Modesty Blaise film) but is largely original. Whereas Modesty in the comic strip and novels was said to be of uncertain Eastern European ancestry (but adopted England as her homeland), and her companion Willie Garvin was a Cockney, the telefilm makes both characters American.

== Plot ==
The plot, set in what appears to be Los Angeles, involves Modesty and Willie preventing the kidnap of a young girl who turns out to be a computer genius and has been working for Tarrant's agency. Although both Modesty and Willie's back stories are given as described by O'Donnell, no explanation is provided for their North American accents or presence in California. Tarrant, as an operative of an American secret service, naturally does not have his knighthood. The super-computer they have been developing has been stolen by Debbie Defarge to use to make a killing on the New York stock exchange. Willie's knife-throwing skills and Modesty's habit of ripping off the lower part of her dress when called to action are faithfully reproduced, as is much of the banter between Willie and Modesty, but in other ways, the characters bear little resemblance to O'Donnell's literary creations.

Another attempt to adapt the comic strip took place in 2003 with the release of My Name Is Modesty.

== Cast ==
- Ann Turkel as Modesty Blaise
- Lewis Van Bergen as Willie Garvin
- Keene Curtis as Sir Gerald Tarrant
- Sab Shimono as Weng
- Douglas Dirkson as Jack Fraser
- Carolyn Seymour as Debbie DeFarge
- Charles Cioffi as Leo Bazin
- Sarah Rush as Emma Woodhouse
- Hector Elias as Placido
- Jan Van Reenen as Narvick
- Leonard Bremen as Sun Bather

== Music ==
"Modesty Plays"

Single by Sparks
- B-side: "Nicotina" "Angst In My Pants"
- Released: 1982(DEU), 1983 (FR)
- Recorded: 1982
- Genre: New wave; synth-pop
- Length: 3:06 (short version); 5:16 (long version)
- Label: Metronome, Underdog
- Songwriters: Ron Mael, Russell Mael
- Producers: Ron Mael, Russell Mael, Greg Penny

Sparks singles chronology
"Eaten by the Monster of Love" (1982)	"Modesty Plays" (1982)	"Get Crazy" (1983)

The American group Sparks wrote and recorded the theme song "Modesty Blaise" for the pilot. After the cancellation of the proposed series, Sparks released the song in Europe under the amended title "Modesty Plays" in late 1982/early 1983. It was subsequently released on the French edition of In Outer Space (1983), and both the original and extended versions were included in the 2013 re-release of Angst in My Pants (1982). The song was also re-recorded and included on their 1986 album Music That You Can Dance To.

The rest of the musical score was produced by Kevin Knelman.

=== Modesty Plays tracklisting ===
7" vinyl (Metronome, Germany)

1. "Modesty Plays" – 3:06
2. "Nicotina" – 3:29

7" vinyl (Underdog, France)

1. "Modesty Plays (Long Version)" – 5:16
2. "Modesty Plays (Short Version)" – 3:06

12" vinyl (Underdog, France)

1. "Modesty Plays" – 5:16
2. "Angst In My Pants" – 3:20
