= Laurence and the Slab Boys =

- Origin: Berlin, Germany
- Genres: indie rock, shoegaze, noisepop
- Years active: 2010-present

Laurence and the Slab Boys are a musical collective formed in 2010 by Larry Reid, the lead guitarist, songwriter and producer in The Cinematics. They formed in Berlin after the breakup of The Cinematics and have variously featured ten members when performing live. The group have released one record to date, Lo-Fi Disgrace, which featured performances from other former members of The Cinematics, Ross Bonney and Adam Goemans. The record was favorably reviewed and received repeated airplay across the BBC radio platform, but to date there has been no follow-up, save for the Songs for B-Movies EP, which consisted of out-takes, live versions, remixes and a cover of "Brilliant Disguise" by Bruce Springsteen.

== Discography ==
- Lo-Fi Disgrace (2012)
