= Interior Design (album) =

Studio album by Sparks
- Released: August 26, 1988
- Studio: The Pentagon Studio (Los Angeles)
- Genre: Synth-pop
- Length: 44:25 (LP); 67:44 (CD)
- Label: Fine Art; Rhino
- Producer: Ron Mael; Russell Mael

Sparks chronology
Music That You Can Dance To (1986)	Interior Design (1988)	Gratuitous Sax & Senseless Violins (1994)

Singles from Interior Design
- 1. "So Important" Released: July 1988; 2. "Just Got Back from Heaven" Released: August 1989

Interior Design is the fifteenth studio album by the American rock duo Sparks, released in August 1988 by Fine Art Records.

== Release ==
Interior Design did little in the way to reverse the commercial fortunes of the duo, and did not appear on the album charts in the US or the UK. The singles "So Important" and "Just Got Back from Heaven" did better, both of which reached the top ten of the Billboard Hot Dance Music/Club Play chart at No. 8 and No. 7 respectively. "Just Got Back from Heaven" also appeared on the Hot Dance Music/Maxi-Singles Sales chart at No. 24.

CD versions of the album included a number of bonus tracks including three versions of the album's final track "Madonna", a remix of "So Important" and the short instrumental "The Big Brass Ring".

== Re-release ==
In 2008, Sparks' own record label Lil' Beethoven Records reissued the album in a digipak sleeve retaining the bonus tracks.

=== Alternate titles ===
For unknown reasons, Interior Design has been re-released multiple times in various European territories as a budget CD or cassette. The most common retitled version is Just Got Back from Heaven. However, many other versions have been released often utilising images of the mid-seventies Island-era iteration of the band. Other releases marketed the album as if it were a greatest hits album.

Alternate titles for Interior Design
Title	Label(s)
Gold	Gold
Heaven and Beyond	WZ Tonträger Vertriebs GmbH
Just Got Back from Heaven	Soundwings; Success; Hallmark Music & Entertainment
Madonna: So Important	Victoria
The Magic Collection	ARC
So Important	LaserLight Digital; Trend
The World of the Sparks / Madonna	Trace Trading

== Critical reception ==
Professional ratings
Review scores
Source	Rating
AllMusic	2.5/5 stars

Craig Jacks of the Summer Trojan, the summer edition of the University of Southern California student newspaper the Daily Trojan, regarded the "subtle, yet very noticeable" presence of guitars as a "refreshing change," in contrast to Sparks' previous studio album Music That You Can Dance To.

== Tour ==
Interior Design was the first Sparks album since 1979's Nº 1 in Heaven that wasn't supported by live performances. However, they staged a promotional event called Love-O-Rama at the Tower Records store in Sherman Oaks, Los Angeles on September 15, 1988.

== Track listing ==
All tracks are written by Ron Mael and Russell Mael.

Side one
No.	Title	Length
1.	"So Important"	4:33
2.	"Just Got Back from Heaven"	4:09
3.	"Lots of Reasons"	3:47
4.	"You've Got a Hold of My Heart"	4:58
5.	"Love-O-Rama"	4:44

Side two
No.	Title	Length
6.	"The Toughest Girl in Town"	4:16
7.	"Let's Make Love"	4:45
8.	"Stop Me If You've Heard This Before"	3:41
9.	"A Walk Down Memory Lane"	4:53
10.	"Madonna"	4:39
Total length:		44:25

CD bonus tracks
No.	Title	Length
11.	"Madonna" (French Version)	4:39
12.	"Madonna" (German Version)	4:39
13.	"Madonna" (Spanish Version)	4:39
14.	"The Big Brass Ring"	2:20
15.	"So Important" (Extremely Important Remix)	7:02
Total length:		67:44

== Personnel ==
- Russell Mael – vocals; production
- Ron Mael – keyboards; production
- Spencer Sircombe (Shark Island) – guitar
- Pamela Stonebrooke – backing vocals
- John Thomas – keyboards; engineering

== Charts ==
"So Important"
Chart (1988)	Peak position
US Dance Club Songs (Billboard)	8

"Just Got Back from Heaven"
Chart (1989)	Peak position
US Dance Club Songs (Billboard)	7
US Dance Singles Sales (Billboard)	24
