= Angst in My Pants =

Studio album by Sparks
- Released: March 29, 1982
- Studio: Musicland (Munich, Germany)
- Genre: New wave; power pop
- Length: 35:31
- Label: Atlantic
- Producer: Mack

Sparks chronology
Whomp That Sucker (1981)	Angst in My Pants (1982)	In Outer Space (1983)

Singles from Angst in My Pants
- 1. "I Predict" Released: April 1982; 2. "Angst in My Pants" Released: 1982 (Germany)

Angst in My Pants is the eleventh studio album by American pop and rock duo Sparks. The album was released on March 29, 1982 by Atlantic Records in both the US and UK, and this was the sixth overall label that the band was signed to in the US, and, for the first time since the mid-1970s, the band would be signed to the same label in both the US and UK for three consecutive studio albums.

== History ==
Angst in My Pants marked the second studio album that keyboardist Ron Mael and lead vocalist Russell Mael worked with the backing band of guitarist Bob Haag, bassist Leslie Bohem, and drummer David Kendrick. James Goodwin augmented the line-up playing additional synthesizers, though these were mixed farther back, letting the rest of the band come to the fore. The resulting power pop album was recorded at Musicland Studios in Munich, West Germany produced by Mack in association with Giorgio Moroder Enterprises. The recording of the album was the second and last time that Sparks worked with Mack. It was the last album to feature Ron sporting his signature toothbrush moustache on the album cover.

In a 1990 interview with Trouser Press, the band discussed how the title track came about from being short one song after the rest of the album had been recorded. According to Russell Mael:

We had another song called "Angst in My Pants" with a totally different melody. It was going to be on the album, but we didn't like it that much. We needed one more song for the album. We're usually well prepared before we record, but somehow we were one song short. We'd finished recording all the other songs. One day in the hotel in Munich, Ron came up with that melody and stuck the old title onto the new song. Mack really liked the song and we recorded it.

== Release ==
Professional ratings
Review scores
Source	Rating
AllMusic	4/5 stars

Angst in My Pants was not a success in the UK but was as successful as their previous studio album, Whomp That Sucker (1981), in the U.S. where it peaked at No. 173 on the Billboard 200.

The single "I Predict" became Sparks' first entry on the Billboard Hot 100 peaking at No. 60 in May 1982. This was the first time since the release of "Wonder Girl" in 1971 that Sparks had any success on the U.S. singles charts. An extended remix of "I Predict" was released as a club promo while the 7" single was backed with the album track "Moustache". The music video for "I Predict" was directed by Steve and Doug Martin in the style of David Lynch, with cinematography by Frederick Elmes.

"Angst in My Pants" and "Eaten by the Monster of Love" were both used in the teen romantic comedy film Valley Girl (1983). "Eaten by the Monster of Love" was also featured in the comedy horror film Cabin Fever 2 (2009), and the sixth season episode of Gilmore Girls, "The Real Paul Anka". "Angst in My Pants" was also featured in the season two episode of the Showtime television series Yellowjackets, "Old Wounds".

The band performed "Mickey Mouse" and "I Predict" as musical guests on the May 15, 1982 episode of Saturday Night Live (SNL). Introduced by host Danny DeVito, "Mickey Mouse" was prefaced by a monologue from Ron Mael, in a deadpan style, describing the characteristics of the common mouse and its various activities, including "scaring women" and "ingesting huge amounts of saccharin in laboratory experiments".

== Track listing ==
All tracks are written by Ron Mael and Russell Mael.

Side one
No.	Title	Length
1.	"Angst in My Pants"	3:25
2.	"I Predict"	2:50
3.	"Sextown U.S.A."	2:56
4.	"Sherlock Holmes"	3:34
5.	"Nicotina"	3:26
6.	"Mickey Mouse"	3:16

Side two
No.	Title	Length
7.	"Moustache"	3:28
8.	"Instant Weight Loss"	3:27
9.	"Tarzan and Jane"	3:18
10.	"The Decline and Fall of Me"	2:53
11.	"Eaten by the Monster of Love"	2:58
Total length:		35:31

Imperial Records (Japan) bonus tracks (2009)
No.	Title	Length
12.	"Angst in My Pants" (Radio Promo Ad)	1:03
13.	"Kidnap" (Unreleased Demo)	3:11
14.	"A Trying Day" (Unreleased Demo)	3:21
15.	"Dancing Is Dangerous (I Ought to Know)" (Unreleased Demo)	3:27

Repertoire Records bonus tracks (2013)
No.	Title	Length
12.	"Modesty Plays" (Short Version)	3:07
13.	"I Predict" (Club Mix)	6:19
14.	"Modesty Plays" (Extended Version)	5:16

== Personnel ==
Credits are adapted from the Angst in My Pants liner notes.

Sparks

- Russell Mael — vocals
- Ron Mael — keyboards, synthesizers, cover concept

Additional musicians

- Leslie Bohem — bass guitar, additional backing vocals
- Bob Haag — guitar, additional backing vocals
- David Kendrick — drums
- James Goodwin — synthesizers
- Reinhold Mack — synthesizer programming

Production

- Mack — production, engineering

== Charts ==
Angst in My Pants
Chart (1982)	Peak position
US Billboard 200	173

"I Predict"
Chart (1982)	Peak position
US Billboard Hot 100	60
