= Music That You Can Dance To =

Studio album by Sparks
- Released: September 1986
- Recorded: 1985–1986
- Studios: Synsound Studios (Brussels, Belgium)
- Genres: Dance-pop; hi-NRG; synth-pop
- Length: 37:17
- Labels: MCA (US); Consolidated Allied (UK)
- Producers: Ron Mael; Russell Mael; Greg Penny

Sparks chronology
Pulling Rabbits Out of a Hat (1984)	Music That You Can Dance To (1986)	Interior Design (1988)

Singles from Music That You Can Dance To
- 1. "Change" Released: July 1985; 2. "Music That You Can Dance To" Released: November 1986; 3. "Fingertips" Released: 1986; 4. "Rosebud" Released: January 1987

Alternative Cover
- The Best of Sparks: Music That You Can Dance To

Professional ratings
Review scores
Source	Rating
AllMusic	3/5 stars
Record Mirror	5/5 stars

Music That You Can Dance To is the fourteenth studio album by American pop duo Sparks, released in September 1986 by MCA Records in the US and Consolidated Allied Records in the UK, two years after their previous studio album, Pulling Rabbits Out of a Hat (1984).

== Background ==
Music That You Can Dance To was the band's most dance music inspired album since their eighth studio album Nº 1 in Heaven (1979). The overall sound of the album was dominated by synthesizers and sequencers like Nº 1 in Heaven but it differed from that release by the inclusion of the heavily distorted bass guitar of Leslie Bohem, and the emphasis on discordant sound effects. "Music That You Can Dance To", "Fingertips" and "The Scene" represent some of Sparks' most hi-NRG dance music leanings. "Shopping Mall of Love", "Let's Get Funky", and (on the original U.S. edition) "Change" presented a side of the band's sound that is discordant and experimental, whereas "Rosebud" and the rerecording of their 1982 single "Modesty Plays" are not dissimilar from the synth-pop sound that the band had pursued on their previous two studio albums. "Armies of the Night" had been recorded for the supernatural horror film Fright Night (1985); the version that appeared on the European editions of Music That You Can Dance To was a re-recording. The song appeared in the movie RAD during the dance sequence.

The recording of the album was the last time that the Mael brothers worked with the backing band line-up of guitarist Bob Haag, bassist Leslie Bohem, and drummer David Kendrick. This line-up had been in place since Sparks' tenth studio album Whomp That Sucker (1981). Sparks' next studio album, Interior Design (1988), was recorded as more of a duo with some guest musicians. Kendrick joined new wave band Devo and appeared on their seventh studio album, Total Devo (1988).

== Release ==
Music That You Can Dance To was even less successful on the album charts than their previous studio album, Pulling Rabbits Out of a Hat (1984), had been. It was released on a number of different record labels across different territories: Consolidated Allied Records in the UK, Curb Records in Germany, and MCA Records in North America and Australasia. For the MCA releases, the album substituted "Armies of the Night" with the 1985 single "Change".

"Music That You Can Dance To", "Rosebud", and "Fingertips" were each released as singles to promote the album. Each was also released as an extended remix. The UK and US remixes of "Music That You Can Dance To" were different. "Fingertips" was released as a club promo in the US and was backed with "The Scene". The club-orientated singles did not register on the mainstream charts, but did make the Billboard Hot Dance Music/Club Play chart; "Music That You Can Dance To" made No. 6 (their highest club chart peak) and the double A-side "Fingertips"/"The Scene" made No. 38.

"Change" was released in the UK on London Records in 1985 and reached No. 85 on the UK singles chart. The standalone single was promoted by an appearance on the British television talk show Wogan. None of the other singles were popular in the UK.

== Critical reception ==
Anita Sarko in Spin was dismissive of the album and remarked that "at one time they were considered rather avant-garde, but now they seem stuck in the techno-pop of years past."

== Re-release ==
In 1990 Curb Records re-released Music That You Can Dance To under the title The Best of Sparks: Music That You Can Dance To. The release featured a different sleeve and corresponded to the MCA track listing, with "Change" and not "Armies of the Night". Repertoire Records reissued the album in 2011 with "Armies of the Night" as track four instead of "Change".

== Track listing ==
All tracks are written by Ron Mael and Russell Mael, except where noted.

Side one
No.	Title	Writer(s)	Length
1.	"Music That You Can Dance To"		4:21
2.	"Rosebud"		4:37
3.	"Fingertips"	Henry Cosby; Clarence Paul	4:20
4.	"Change" (substituted with "Armies of the Night" on non-MCA editions)		5:17

Side two
No.	Title	Length
5.	"The Scene"	6:11
6.	"Shopping Mall of Love"	3:14
7.	"Modesty Plays" (New version)	3:59
8.	"Let's Get Funky"	6:05
Total length:		37:17

== Personnel ==
Sparks

- Russell Mael – vocals
- Ron Mael – all synthesizers (Fairlight CMI; Roland Jupiter-8; Yamaha DX7); lead vocals on "Shopping Mall of Love"

Additional musicians

- Bob Haag – Endodyne guitars; Roland synthesizers; backing vocals
- Leslie Bohem – bass guitar; backing vocals
- David Kendrick – drums
- John Thomas – additional keyboards
- Robert Mache – guitar on "Fingertips"

Production

- Ron Mael – producer
- Russell Mael – producer
- Greg Penny – production on "Modesty Plays (New Version)"

== Charts ==
"Change"
Chart (1985)	Peak position
UK Singles (Official Charts)	85

"Music That You Can Dance To"
Chart (1986)	Peak position
US Dance Club Songs (Billboard)	6
US Dance Singles Sales (Billboard)	11

"Fingertips" / "The Scene"
Chart (1986)	Peak position
US Dance Club Songs (Billboard)	38
