= Break (EP) =

Break EP

EP by The Cinematics
- Released: 27 March 2006
- Genres: Post-punk revival, indie rock
- Length: 15:16
- Label: TVT Records

The Cinematics chronology
| ''Break EP'' (2006) | A Strange Education (2007) |

Break EP is the debut EP by the Scottish band The Cinematics, released on 27 March 2006. Break, Sunday Sun, and Home appear in their LP versions on The Cinematics 2007 album A Strange Education. Sunday Sun is a cover from Beck's 2002 album Sea Change.

== Track listing ==
1. "Break (radio edit)" (The Cinematics) – (3:39)
2. "Burning Light" (The Cinematics) – (4:08)
3. "Sunday Sun (radio edit)" (Beck Hansen) – (3:29)
4. "Home (acoustic)" (Scott Rinning/Angus Carbarns) – (4:30)
