= Disgraceful =

Studio album by Dubstar
- Released: 9 October 1995
- Genre: Synthpop
- Length: 43:12
- Label: Food
- Producer: Stephen Hague, Graeme Robinson

Dubstar chronology
Disgraceful (1995)	Goodbye (1997)

Singles from Disgraceful
- 1. "Stars" Released: 26 June 1995; 2. "Anywhere" Released: 18 September 1995; 3. "Not So Manic Now" Released: 25 December 1995; 4. "Stars" Released: 18 March 1996 (re-release); 5. "Elevator Song" Released: 22 July 1996

Disgraceful is the debut album by British band Dubstar. It was released in October 1995 on the Food label, a division of EMI that was also home to Blur.

The album features two covers; "Not So Manic Now" which was originally recorded by Brick Supply on their 1994 EP Somebody's Intermezzo, and "St. Swithin's Day" which was originally recorded by Billy Bragg on his 1984 album Brewing Up with Billy Bragg.

All four singles released from the album were top 40 hits on the UK Singles Chart.

== Artwork censorship ==
Disgraceful's cover underwent a revision after some time on general release. The original cover contained a furry blue pencil case with a balloon inside, creating a somewhat labia-like effect. This was later revised to the current, slightly less blatant bunny slipper design.

== Critical reception ==
Professional ratings
Review scores
Source	Rating
AllMusic	4.5/5 stars
Music Week	4/5 stars
NME	7/10

A reviewer from British magazine Music Week wrote, "Delicate, poignant pop from the Gateshead [sic] trio, with Sarah Blackwood's voice soaring above synthesised melodies and strings."

== Track listing ==
All tracks written by Steve Hillier except where noted.

1. "Stars" – 4:09
2. "Anywhere" (Hillier, Chris Wilkie) – 3:39
3. "Just a Girl She Said" (Sarah Blackwood, Hillier, Wilkie) – 4:39
4. "Elevator Song" – 2:54
5. "The Day I See You Again" – 4:20
6. "Week in Week Out" (Blackwood, Hillier, Wilkie) – 4:28
7. "Not So Manic Now" (Harling, Kirby, Mason, Robinson) – 4:29
8. "Popdorian" – 2:53
9. "Not Once, Not Ever" – 3:50
10. "St. Swithin's Day" (Bragg) – 4:01
11. "Disgraceful" – 3:50

== Personnel ==
Dubstar

- Sarah Blackwood – vocals
- Steve Hillier – songwriting & programming
- Chris Wilkie – guitar

Additional personnel

- Jon Kirby – additional arrangements and keyboards
- Audrey Riley – cello
- Andy Duncan – percussion
- Graeme Robinson – drums
- Phil Spalding – bass
- Stephen Hague – accordion
