= Love and Terror =

Studio album by The Cinematics
- Released: 28 September 2009
- Recorded: Park Lane Studios, Glasgow and various other locations
- Genre: Post-punk revival, indie rock
- Length: 37:26
- Label: The Orchard/ Sony Music
- Producer: Larry Reid

The Cinematics chronology
A Strange Education (2007)	Love and Terror (2009)	Silent Scream EP (2010)

Professional ratings
Review scores
Source	Rating
Audioscribbler	7.5/10 stars
NME	6/10 stars
InTheNews	8/10 stars
QRO Magazine	8.0/10 stars
Atomic Duster	9/10 stars

Love and Terror is the second and final album from the Scottish Indie band The Cinematics. The album's first single, "Love and Terror" was released on 13 July 2009. The second single is called "New Mexico" and it was released on 14 September 2009. Recorded at the now-defunct Park Lane Studios in Glasgow and also at various other locations, collectively referred to as "The Cinema" in the album liner-notes, Love and Terror was produced by The Cinematics' lead guitarist, Larry Reid. The album was mixed by Dave McLean of the band Union of Knives.

== Track listing ==
1. "All These Things" – 3:18
2. "She Talks to the Trees" – 3:04
3. "New Mexico" – 4:12
4. "Love and Terror" – 4:30
5. "Lips Taste Like Tears" – 3:02
6. "Wish (When the Banks Collapse)" – 3:25
7. "Hospital Bills" – 3:55
8. "Moving to Berlin" – 3:21
9. "You Can Dance" – 3:52
10. "Hard for Young Lovers" – 4:47
- All Music by Reid & Goemans, except tracks 4, 6 & 9 by Reid and tracks 3 & 5 by Rinning.
- All Words by Reid, except tracks 3 & 5 by Rinning.

== Personnel ==
- The Cinematics
  - Scott Rinning – Vocals, Guitar
  - Larry Reid – Lead guitar, backing vocals, synth, production
  - Adam Goemans – Bass guitar, Synth
  - Ross Bonney – Drums
- Dave McLean – Mix engineer
- Dave Donaldson – Mastering engineer
