= Stars: The Best of Dubstar =

Greatest hits album by Dubstar
- Released: April 2004
- Genre: Synthpop

Dubstar chronology
Make It Better (2000)	Stars: The Best of Dubstar (2004)	One (2018)

Stars: The Best Of Dubstar is a compilation album by British dance-pop band, Dubstar, released in April 2004. The album contains a hidden track: a remix of "Stars", following (but on the same track as) "Self Same Thing". All songs written by Steve Hillier except where noted.

== Track listing ==
1. "Stars" [Original Mix]
2. "Anywhere" (Hillier, Wilkie)
3. "The Day I See You Again"
4. "Jealousy" (Tennant, Lowe)
5. "Just A Girl She Said" (Blackwood, Hillier, Wilkie)
6. "Elevator Song"
7. "Not So Manic Now"
8. "No More Talk"
9. "I Will Be Your Girlfriend" (Hillier, Wilkie)
10. "In Charge (From Shooting Fish)" (Hillier, Wilkie)
11. "Cathedral Park"
12. "Ghost"
13. "Can't Tell Me" (Wilkie)
14. "I (Friday Night)"
15. "The Self Same Thing"

=== Alternate track listing ===
1. "Stars" [Original Mix]
2. "Anywhere" (Hillier, Wilkie)
3. "The Day I See You Again"
4. "Just A Girl She Said" (Blackwood, Hillier, Wilkie)
5. "Elevator Song" [Acoustic Version]
6. "Not So Manic Now"
7. "No More Talk"
8. "I Will Be Your Girlfriend" (Hillier, Wilkie)
9. "Cathedral Park"
10. "Can't Tell Me" (Wilkie)
11. "Ghost"
12. "When the World Knows Your Name" [Demo Version]
13. "I (Friday Night)"
14. "The Self Same Thing"
15. "Swansong" (including hidden track "Stars" [Acoustic Version])
