= Sarah Blackwood =

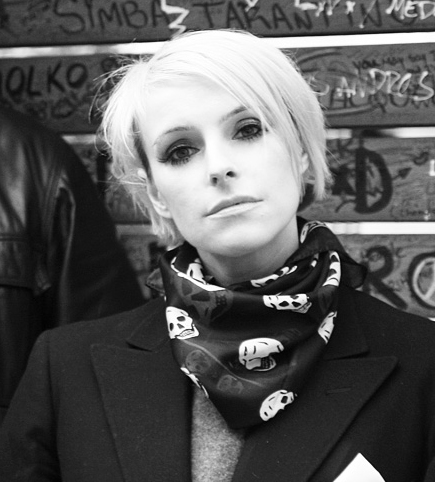
- Blackwood in 2010

Background information
- Also known as: Client B (in Client)
- Born: 6 May 1971 (age 55); Halifax, West Yorkshire, England
- Genres: Dream pop; electronic
- Years active: 1990–present
- Labels: Food Records; Toast Hawaii; Mute; EMI
- Member of: Dubstar; Client
- Website: dubstarofficial.co

Sarah Blackwood (born 6 May 1971) is an English recording artist. She came to prominence as the lead singer of Dubstar, and as Client B in the band Client.

== Career ==
Blackwood was born in Halifax, West Yorkshire, England, attended a local school, and went to Newcastle University to study interior design. She lived in Manchester when operating exclusively within Dubstar, but lives and works in London as of 2015.

=== Dubstar ===
Formerly known as The Joans, Dubstar were initially a two-piece band, with Chris Wilkie on guitar and Steve Hillier on vocals and keyboards. Sarah Blackwood was invited to join the band in August 1993 and replaced Hillier on vocals in early 1994; Dubstar were signed shortly after.

The band released five albums with Blackwood on vocals: Disgraceful (1995), Goodbye (1997), Make It Better (2000), One (2018) and Two (2022). A compilation, Stars: The Best of Dubstar was released in 2004. Blackwood moved on to other projects but kept in touch with Dubstar members as her debut solo EP in 2008 called Acoustic at the Club Bar & Dining features Wilkie on guitar.

=== Client ===
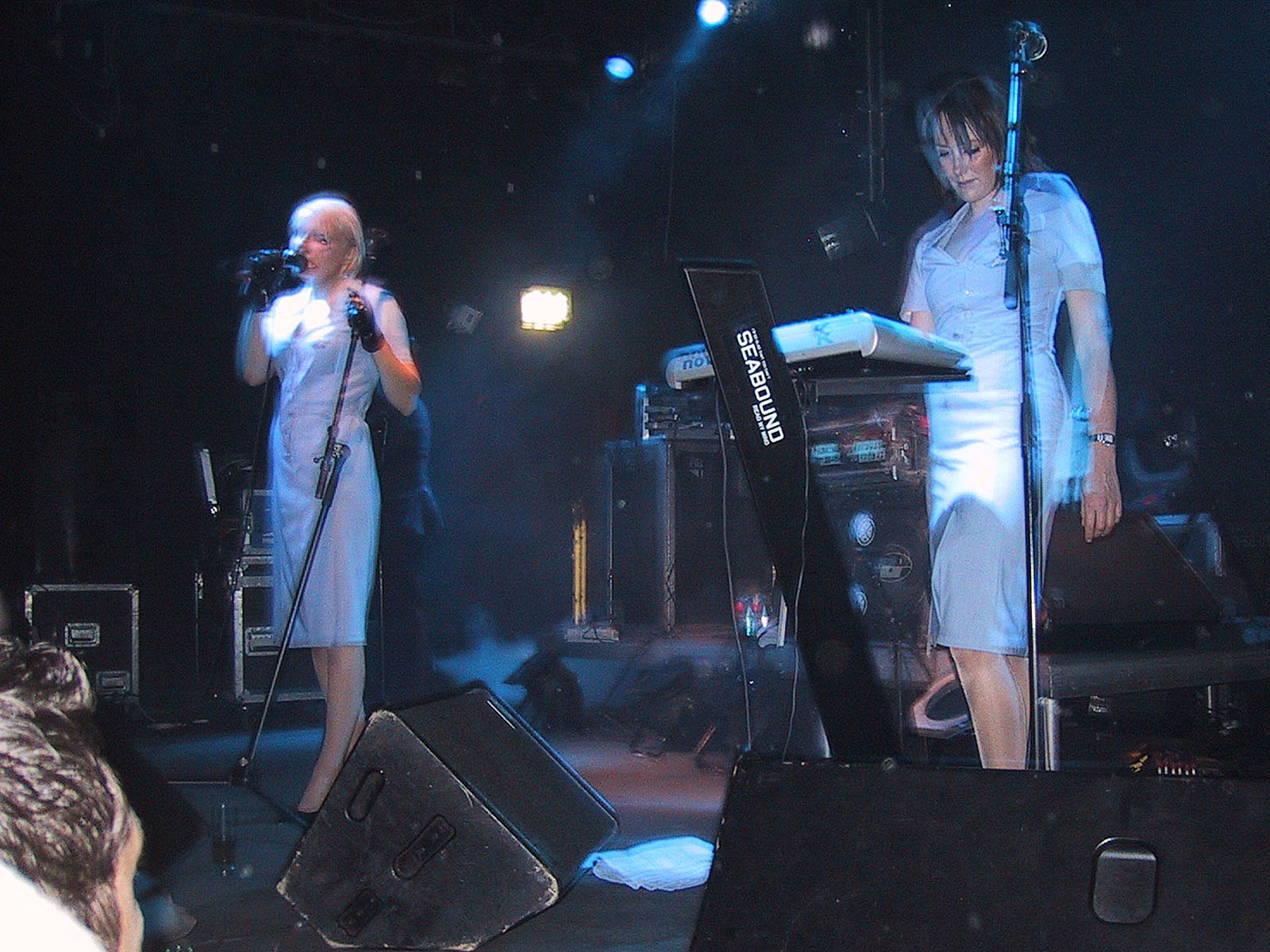
Client performing at Kulturfabrik Krefeld in Germany on 17 September 2005. Sarah Blackwood (left), Kate Holmes (right)

Blackwood joined the band Technique to replace Xan Tyler as singer for a European tour with Depeche Mode in 2002. Shortly afterwards, Kate Holmes, the other member of the band, and Blackwood decided to write together and formed the new group Client. She used the stage name Client B since the band preferred not to highlight the names of its members, rather identifying each as "Client" plus a letter from the alphabet.

== Discography ==
=== Albums ===
Dubstar

- 1995: Disgraceful
- 1997: Goodbye
- 2000: Make It Better
- 2004: Stars – The Best of Dubstar (compilation album)
- 2018: One
- 2022: Two

Client

(Sarah Blackwood credited as Client B)

- 2003: Client
- 2004: City
- 2007: Heartland
- 2009: Command

=== EPs ===
in Dubstar

- 2000: Self Same Thing EP

as Client B

- 2007: Client B Acoustic at the Club Bar & Dining

=== Singles ===
(For details of singles, refer to tables in the discography sections in article of Dubstar and of Client)
