= Shut Eye =

2010s American drama TV series

- Genre: Drama
- Created by: Leslie Bohem
- Starring: Jeffrey Donovan; KaDee Strickland; Susan Misner; Emmanuelle Chriqui; David Zayas; Isabella Rossellini; Dylan Ray Schmid; Havana Guppy
- Theme music composer: Melpo Mene (season 2)
- Opening theme: "Walk on Well Lighted Streets" by Leslie Bohem (season 1)
- Composers: Ben Decter (season 1); Joseph Stephens (season 2)
- Country of origin: United States
- Original language: English
- No. of seasons: 2
- No. of episodes: 20

Production
- Executive producers: Melissa Bernstein; Leslie Bohem; Mark Johnson; Larysa Kondracki (season 1); David Hudgins (season 1); John Shiban (season 2)
- Producers: Ron French (season 1); Jonathan Igla (season 2); Pavlina Hatoupis (season 2)
- Running time: 43–51 minutes
- Production companies: Peg + Les; Gran Via Productions; TriStar Television

Original release
- Network: Hulu
- Release: December 7, 2016 – December 6, 2017

Shut Eye is an American drama television series created by Leslie Bohem, airing on the streaming service Hulu. It was given a straight-to-series 10-episode order. All ten episodes became available on December 7, 2016. A second season was ordered on March 20, 2017 which was released on December 6, 2017. The series originally was led by David Hudgins as showrunner during season one before he was replaced by John Shiban for season two. On January 30, 2018, the series was canceled after two seasons.

== Premise ==
The series centers around the life of failed magician Charlie Haverford (Jeffrey Donovan), who now works as a psychic and suddenly starts to have real visions.

== Cast and characters ==
=== Main ===
- Jeffrey Donovan as Charlie Haverford
- KaDee Strickland as Linda Haverford, Charlie's wife
- Angus Sampson as Fonso Marks - Rita's son
- David Zayas as Eduardo Bernal
- Susan Misner as Dr. Nora White, a neuroscientist
- Emmanuelle Chriqui as Gina, a hypnotist
- Isabella Rossellini as Rita Marks - Matriarch
- Dylan Ray Schmid as Nick Haverford - Son
- Havana Guppy as Drina Marks

=== Recurring ===
- Layla Alizada as Simza
- Mel Harris as Nadine Davies
- Zak Santiago as White Tony
- Aasif Mandvi as Pazhani 'Paz' Kapoor
- Erica Gimpel as Agent Sims (season 2)

== Episodes ==
Season	Episodes	Originally released
1	10	December 7, 2016
2	10	December 6, 2017

=== Season 1 (2016) ===
No. overall	No. in season	Title	Directed by	Written by	Original release date
1	1	"Death"	Johan Renck	Leslie Bohem	December 7, 2016
2	2	"The Hanged Man"	Craig Zisk	Charlie Keys Bohem & Leslie Bohem	December 7, 2016
3	3	"The Fool"	Michael Trim	Leslie Bohem	December 7, 2016
4	4	"The Tower - Reversed"	Clark Johnson	Leslie Bohem	December 7, 2016
5	5	"The Magician"	Minkie Spiro	Greg Walker	December 7, 2016
6	6	"Judgment"	Daisy von Scherler Mayer	Daria Polatin	December 7, 2016
7	7	"Two of Swords"	Michael Morris	Tom Pabst	December 7, 2016
8	8	"Five of Cups"	Bronwen Hughes	Patricia Breen	December 7, 2016
9	9	"Wheel of Fortune"	Stephen Gyllenhaal	Leslie Bohem & Hiram Martinez	December 7, 2016
10	10	"Ace of Swords"	Larysa Kondracki	Leslie Bohem	December 7, 2016

=== Season 2 (2017) ===
No. overall	No. in season	Title	Directed by	Written by	Original release date
11	1	"We're Not in Kansas Anymore"	Scott Winant	John Shiban	December 6, 2017
12	2	"Shortchanged"	Meera Menon	Will Pascoe	December 6, 2017
13	3	"Guys and Dolls"	Sheree Folkson	Brett Conrad & Amy Berg	December 6, 2017
14	4	"Are You Listening?"	Stephen Gyllenhaal	Katrina Cabrera	December 6, 2017
15	5	"Charles the Magnificent"	Robbie Pickering	Jonathan Igla	December 6, 2017
16	6	"Crimes and Punishments"	Jennifer Getzinger	Will Pascoe	December 6, 2017
17	7	"Purple Hearts"	Michael Trim	Amy Berg	December 6, 2017
18	8	"Karma Chameleon"	John Shiban	John Shiban & Jonathan Igla	December 6, 2017
19	9	"Vérité"	Deborah Chow	Amy Berg	December 6, 2017
20	10	"There's No Place Like Home"	John Shiban	John Shiban	December 6, 2017

== Production ==
Following the first season, John Shiban replaced David Hudgins as showrunner.

=== Music ===
The series' musical score was composed by Ben Decter. He was replaced by Joseph Stephens for Season 2.

== See also ==
- List of original programs distributed by Hulu
