= Cool Places =

Single by Sparks and Jane Wiedlin

from the album In Outer Space
- B-side: "Sports"
- Released: April 1983
- Studio: Synsound Studios (Brussels)
- Genre: New wave; synth-pop
- Length: 3:25
- Label: Atlantic
- Songwriter(s): Ron Mael; Russell Mael
- Producer(s): Ron Mael; Russell Mael

Sparks singles chronology
"I Predict" (1982)	"Cool Places" (1983)	"All You Ever Think About Is Sex" (1983)

Jane Wiedlin singles chronology
"Cool Places" (1983)	"Blue Kiss" (1985)

"Cool Places" is a 1983 new wave song recorded by American pop duo Sparks in collaboration with the Go-Go's rhythm guitarist and backing vocalist Jane Wiedlin. It was their second single to enter the Billboard Hot 100.

== Background ==
The song was released as the lead single from Sparks's twelfth studio album In Outer Space (1983). At the time, Sparks were at their most popular in the US, their two previous studio albums having dented the lower reaches of the Billboard 200 album chart. The single peaked at No. 13 on the Hot Dance Club Play charts in June 1983. The song's success followed the success of their previous single and only other Hot 100 entry "I Predict".

A music video for the song was directed by California born screenwriter and film director Graeme Whifler.

Sparks recorded "Lucky Me, Lucky You" with Jane Wiedlin for the same parent album.

== Track listing ==
7" Atlantic 0-89863

1. "Cool Places" — 3:25
2. "Sports" — 3:23

12" Atlantic 0-89863

1. "Cool Places" (Long Mix) — 4:38
2. "Sports" — 3:23

== Chart performance ==
Chart (1983)	Peak position
US Billboard Hot 100	49
US Billboard Hot Dance Club Play	13
US Cash Box Top 100 Singles	44

== Other versions ==
The song was part of the Go-Go's set when they toured in the 2010s, with Belinda Carlisle singing the Russell Mael vocals opposite Wiedlin.
