= Dubstar =

English indie-dance duo

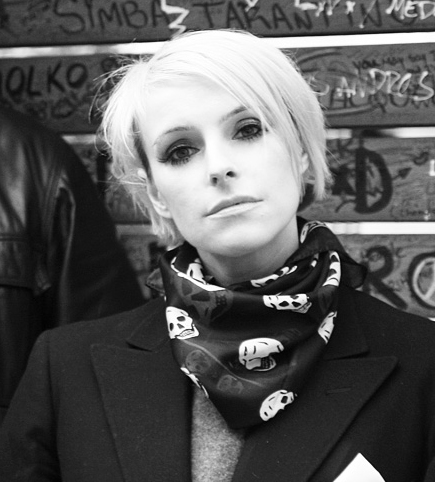
- Sarah Blackwood, Dubstar vocalist

Background information
- Origin: Newcastle, England
- Genres: Alternative dance; Britpop; dream pop; synthpop; electropop; electronic rock
- Years active: 1992–present
- Labels: Food, Northern Writes
- Members: Sarah Blackwood; Chris Wilkie
- Past members: Steve Hillier
- Website: www.dubstarofficial.co

Dubstar are an English indie-dance duo, performing songs with hints of Britpop, dream pop and synth, as well as the occasional pop ballad and guitar-laden rock with industrial twists. The group was formed in 1992 by Steve Hillier and Chris Wilkie in Newcastle-upon-Tyne. Sarah Blackwood joined in 1993 as vocalist.

"Stars", the best-selling single by Dubstar, received a great deal of play time in clubs. Many remixes were also created of this song and it was covered by metal band Lacuna Coil on their 2000 EP Halflife.

== Career ==
Formerly known as The Joans, Dubstar were initially a two-piece band, with Chris Wilkie playing guitar and Steve Hillier singing and playing keyboards. Gavin Lee joined The Joans in the autumn of 1992 and played drums and, later, bass guitar before leaving to pursue a career at British Airways the following year. Performance artist and musician Mark Greenwood also played bass in The Joans for a number gigs in the summer of 1992. Sarah Blackwood was invited to join the band in August 1993, after her boyfriend accidentally left a cassette tape of her singing in Steve Hillier's flat in Jesmond, Newcastle-upon-Tyne. Blackwood replaced Hillier on vocals in early 1994.

Dubstar appointed Darlington-based record producer and talent manager Graeme Robinson as their manager after Robinson had seen them play in a sparsely attended Newcastle club in March 1994. Robinson renamed the band and provided studio time and produced independent demos of seventeen songs which he brought to the attention of former Sounds journalist, Andy Ross, who promptly signed the band to his Camden-based label, Food Records. Ross engaged the services of Pet Shop Boys and New Order producer Stephen Hague, to co-produce a number of tracks with Robinson for their critically acclaimed debut album, Disgraceful (1995), and commissioned an advertising campaign featuring Robert Steel's controversial "pencil case vulva" artwork. The album charted well on release in July 1995, and by January 1996 Dubstar had arrived in the Top 20 of the UK Singles Chart with "Not So Manic Now", (originally written and recorded by Brick Supply), followed by a re-released "Stars", which marked Dubstar's UK chart zenith.

In June 1997, Dubstar contributed a cover of "Everyday I Die" to the Gary Numan tribute album Random. In September, the band released their second UK album, Goodbye. The group's debut US album, also called Goodbye, was released on Polydor Records in 1998 and combined tracks from both the first and second albums. The third original Dubstar album, Make It Better, was released in 2000. Hillier quit the band just before its release. EMI released a best-of compilation titled Stars: The Best of Dubstar in 2004.

In 2002, Blackwood was recruited by ex-Frazier Chorus member Kate Holmes to join her duo Technique, replacing singer Xan Tyler for a European tour with Depeche Mode. Shortly afterwards, Holmes and Blackwood decided to write together and formed a new pseudonymous electropop act, Client (stylised CLIEИT). The duo would not have their faces photographed in promotional photos, with Holmes and Blackwood being referred to Client A and Client B. Client would chart three singles in the UK, with their biggest, "Pornography", getting to No. 22 in 2005.

Posts in 2008 on their official Myspace page stated that the recording of Dubstar's fourth album was underway. However, in November 2008 they made a post to their Facebook group stating that Blackwood would not participate, and the future of the album was up in the air. Blackwood and Wilkie have worked together in the interim, as Blackwood's first solo album, 2008's Acoustic at the Club Bar & Dining, features Wilkie on guitar; the seven-track live recording was released exclusively online, and consists of acoustic versions of Dubstar and Client songs, plus covers of tracks by The Smiths and New Order.

On 12 April 2010, the band released a cover of "I'm in Love with a German Film Star" for an Amnesty International project. Interviewed by Andrew Collins on BBC 6 Music that afternoon, Blackwood confirmed that the band were back together and would be going into studio to record tracks for a new Dubstar album, although she would continue to also record with Client. However, in December 2010, it was announced that Blackwood had left Client and a new member was being recruited to front that band.

Dubstar released a new single, "Waltz no.9", on 1 June 2018. Via their website, they revealed that it was taken from a new album titled One, due for release on 28 September 2018. The album was produced by Youth and published by the band's own label, Northern Writes. The release date was 12 October 2018.

On 27 August 2020, Dubstar released a pandemic-inspired track titled "Hygiene Strip". A video for the new song was released on the same day. Later in 2020, the duo released the disco-pop track "I Can See You Outside", which was recorded during the United Kingdom's first COVID-19 lockdown and which was co-produced with Stephen Hague. The album Two was released on 6 May 2022.

On 19 December 2025, the band released a cover of "We're The Lucky Ones" by The Marías as a Christmas single.

== Personnel ==
- Sarah Blackwood – songwriter, vocalist
- Chris Wilkie – songwriter, guitarist, keyboard programming

=== Former personnel ===
- Mark Greenwood – bassist
- Steve Hillier – songwriting, keyboard programming (1992–2014)
- Gavin Lee – drummer, bassist

=== Additional live band members ===
- Rochelle Vincente – backing vocalist
- Diid Osman – bassist
- Paul Wadsworth – drummer, percussionist

== Discography ==
Dubstar discography
- Studio albums: 5
- Extended plays: 1
- Compilation albums: 1
- Singles: 13
- Music videos: 13

The discography of Dubstar consists of five studio albums, a compilation album, an extended play, thirteen singles, and six songs exclusive to compilation and soundtrack albums. Prior to 2018, all of the group's work was released by Food Records with the exception of their compilation album which was released by EMI, due to the closure of Food Records in 2001. In 2018, the group started releasing records on their own label, Northern Writes. Their fifth album Two saw the duo re-enter the UK Albums Chart for the first time since Goodbye in 1997.

=== Studio albums ===
- Disgraceful (9 October 1995, Food Records) UK No. 30
- Goodbye (22 September 1997, Food Records) UK No. 18
- Make It Better (28 August 2000, Food Records) UK No. 112
- One (12 October 2018, Northern Writes Records)
- Two (6 May 2022, Northern Writes Records) UK No. 86

=== Compilation albums ===
- Stars: The Best of Dubstar (29 March 2004, EMI)

=== Singles ===
The following singles were released in the UK:

Year	Single	UK	Israel	Album	UK	Certifications
1995	"Stars"	40	1	Disgraceful	30	UK: Gold
1995	"Anywhere"	37		Disgraceful	30	UK: Gold
1995	"Not So Manic Now"	19	2	Disgraceful	30	UK: Gold
1996	"Stars" (re-release)	15		Disgraceful	30	UK: Gold
1996	"Elevator Song"	25		Disgraceful	30	UK: Gold
1997	"No More Talk"	20	15	Goodbye	18	
1997	"Cathedral Park"	41		Goodbye	18	
1998	"I Will Be Your Girlfriend"	28		Goodbye	18	
2000	"I (Friday Night)"	37		Make It Better	112	
2018	"Waltz No.9"	-		One		
2018	"You Were Never in Love"	-		One		
2018	"Love Comes Late"	-		One		
2018	"Why Don't You Kiss Me"	-		One		
2020	"Hygiene Strip"	-		Two	86	
2020	"I Can See You Outside"	-		Two	86	
2021	"Tectonic Plates"	-		Two	86	
2022	"Token"	-		Two	86	
2022	"Tears"	-		Two	86	

=== Music videos ===
- "Stars" (1995)
- "Anywhere" (1995)
- "Not So Manic Now" (1995)
- "Stars" (new version (vacuum cleaner in the sky)) (1996)
- "Stars" (USA version) (1996)
- "Elevator Song" (1996)
- "No More Talk" (1997)
- "Cathedral Park" (1997)
- "I Will Be Your Girlfriend" (1998)
- "I (Friday Night)" (2000)
- "The Self Same Thing" (2000)
- "You Were Never In Love" (2018)
- "Love Comes Late" (2018)
- "Why Don't You Kiss Me" (2018)
- "I Can See You Outside" (2020)
- “Token” (2022)
- "I Can See You Outside (new version)" (2022)

=== Extended plays ===
- The Self Same Thing (2000, Food/EMI) (chart-ineligible EP)

=== Exclusive songs ===
- "Not So Fast" – Volume Sixteen (1996)
- "Everyday I Die" – Random (1997) (Gary Numan tribute album)
- "In Charge" – Shooting Fish Soundtrack (1997)
- "Jealousy" – Come Again (EMI, UK, 1997) / Essential: Interpretations (Capitol, 1998)
- "Poupée de Cire, Poupée de Son" featuring Sacha Distel – Song for Eurotrash (1998)
- "I'm in Love with a German Film Star" from Peace, a compilation for Amnesty International (2010)
- "Circle Turns" – Record Store Day single (2012)
