= The Cinematics =

Scottish rock band

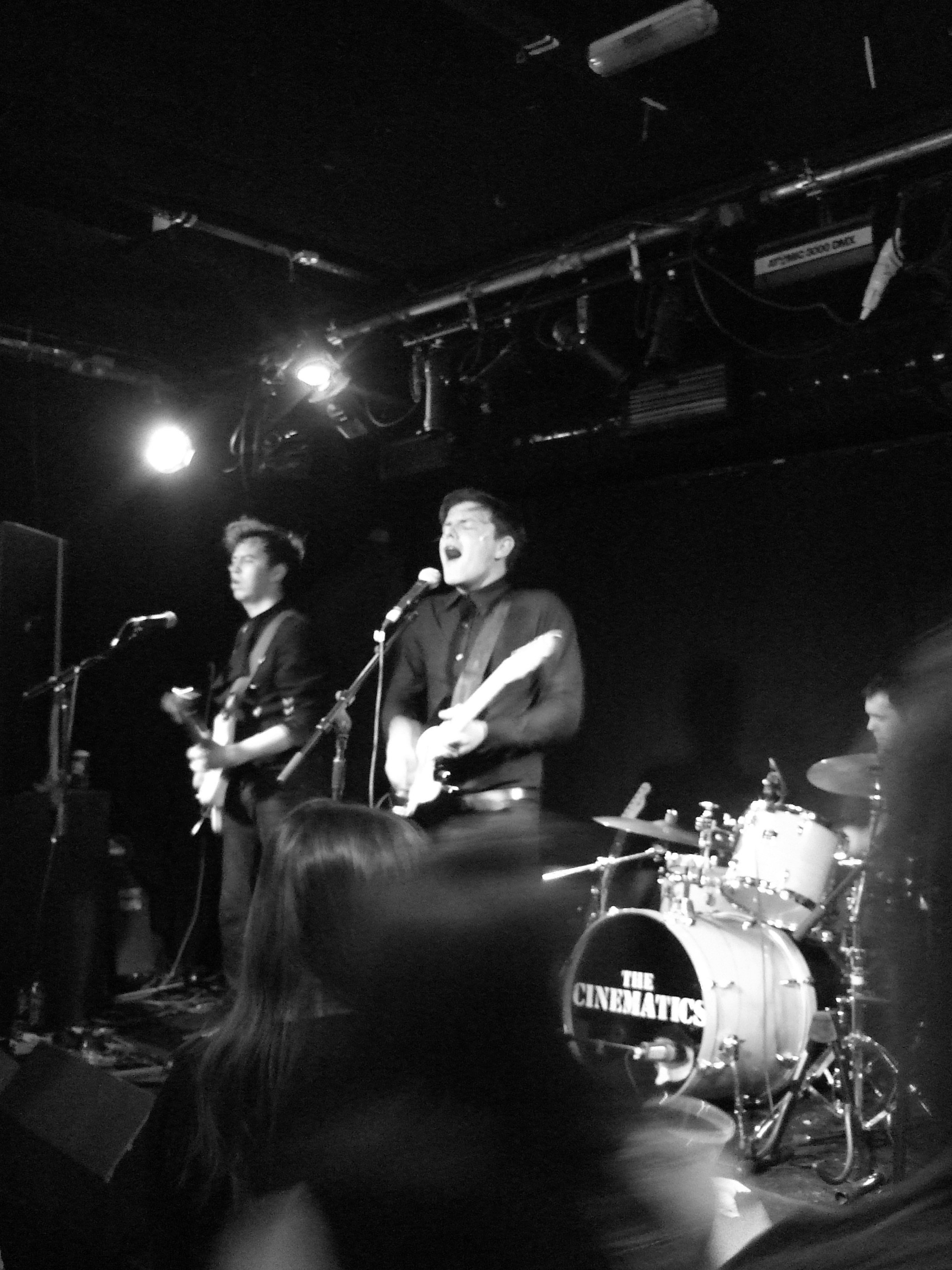
- In performance at the Barfly, Camden, April 2009

Background information
- Origin: Glasgow, Scotland
- Genres: Post-punk revival, indie rock, alternative rock
- Years active: 2003–2011
- Label: The Orchard / TVT Records
- Past members: Ross Bonney; Adam Goemans; Scott Rinning; Larry Reid; Ramsay Miller
- Website: thecinematics.com

The Cinematics were a Scottish alternative rock band founded in 2003 in Glasgow, Scotland, and disbanded in 2011. The band released two albums, A Strange Education (2007) and Love and Terror (2009), as well as a five-track EP, "Silent Scream EP" (2010), but disbanded in the middle of recording their third album. The band consisted of Scott Rinning, Ramsay Miller, Adam Goemans and Ross Bonney with Larry Reid joining the band in 2008.

== History ==
=== Formation and A Strange Education (2003–2008) ===
The band was formed by Scott Rinning (vocals and guitar), Ramsay Miller (lead guitar), Adam Goemans (bass) and Ross Bonney (drums) in 2003 in Glasgow, however, the members originally met at school in Dingwall. The band were signed to TVT Records in 2005 after playing at an In the City showcase gig in Manchester.

Their debut album A Strange Education was produced by Simon Barnicott and Stephen Hague, and released on 6 March 2007.

In early 2008, it was reported that TVT Records was suffering financial difficulties and was forced to file for Chapter 11/Bankruptcy. The label and its assets were purchased by New York-based digital-distribution company, The Orchard. Much of the TVT roster was dropped, but The Cinematics' recording contract was retained. Around the same time, the band parted company with Ramsay Miller, who was replaced by Larry Reid, who had previously played with the band live on tour.

=== Love and Terror and the break-up (2009–2011) ===
In their Myspace blogs, the band reported at various stages that they were writing and self-producing their second studio album, despite suggestions that it would be produced by Richard Gottehrer (Blondie, Dr Feelgood, Richard Hell).

The Cinematics' second album, Love and Terror, was released on 6 October 2009. On 22 May 2010, the band released a five-track EP titled Silent Scream EP, recorded partially live while on tour during late 2009 and early 2010. Both Love and Terror and the EP were produced by the band's guitarist, Larry Reid.

In 2010, Reservoir Media Management acquired 100% of the Cinematics publishing assets which had formerly been administered by TVT Music Enterprises, LLC.

The Cinematics moved to Berlin in 2010 and began recording their third studio album there. The album was set to be named "Kino". In July 2011, however, Reid announced in an interview with The Pop Cop that the band had disbanded before completing it. The Cinematics' third album remains unreleased to date, but the band did make one track - "Nausea" - available free to fans on their Facebook page.

In June 2012, Larry Reid released an album with his post-Cinematics project, Laurence and the Slab Boys. The record, Lo-Fi Disgrace, features appearances by fellow Cinematics, Ross Bonney and Adam Goemans.

== Band members ==
=== Final line-up ===
- Ross Bonney – drums (2003–2011)
- Adam Goemans – bass (2003–2011)
- Scott Rinning – lead vocals, guitar (2003–2011)
- Larry Reid – lead guitar (2008–2011)

=== Past members ===
- Ramsay Miller – lead guitar (2003–2008)

== Equipment ==
- Ross Bonney: Yamaha Drums, Vic Firth sticks
- Adam Goemans: Fender 76 Precision bass, Ampeg bass head and 4x10 cab
- Scott Rinning: Fender Telecaster, Boss / MXR pedals, Fender Hot Rod Deluxe Amp
- Larry Reid: Fender Jazzmaster, Boss/Electro Harmonix/Ibanez pedals, Vox AC30 Amp

== Discography ==
=== Studio albums ===
- A Strange Education (March 2007)
- Love and Terror (September 2009)

=== Extended plays ===
- Break EP (27 March 2006)
- Live Sessions EP (2007) (iTunes exclusive download)
- Silent Scream EP (22 May 2010)

=== Singles ===
- "Chase" (October 2005) (UK No. 197)
- "Break" (November 2006) (UK No. 129)
- "Keep Forgetting" (February 2007)
- "Love and Terror" (10 August 2009)
- "New Mexico" (14 September 2009)

=== Music videos ===
- "Chase" (2005)
- "Break" (2006)
- "Keep Forgetting" (2006)
- "Love and Terror" (2009)
- "New Mexico" (2009)
