= The Modern (band) =

British electropop band

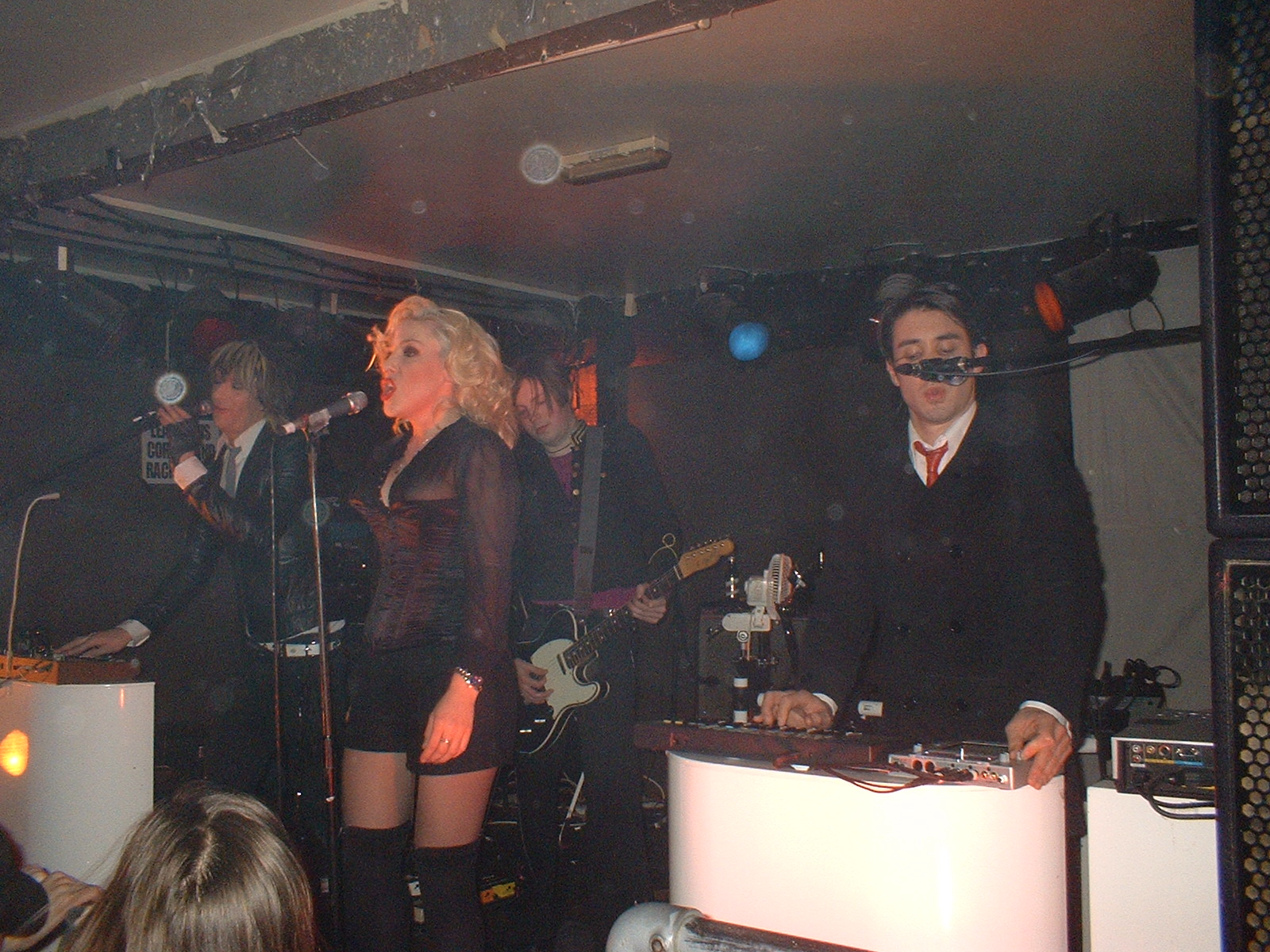
The Modern/Matinée Club playing at The Charlotte in March 2006.

The Modern are a British electropop band. They are currently signed to Ninth Wave Records in the United States and EQ Music in Asia. The band consists of vocalist Emma Cooke, with Nathan Cooper and Chi Tudor-Hart on vocals and synthesizers. The band changed their name from Dirty Blonde to The Modern in 2003, and then on to Matinee Club in September 2006, before reverting to The Modern in November 2008.

== History ==
The band first began to form in 2001. Fronted by Nathan Cooper and Chi Tudor-Hart, the group were then known as Dirty Blonde. In 2003, vocalist Emma Cooke joined the band, and they changed their name to The Modern. Influences invoked by Cooper included New Order, Duran Duran, Japan and OMD.

Following Cooke's induction to the group, guitarist Telee and drummer Rees also joined. Rees then left the band to tour with Dirty Vegas, and was replaced by Bob Malkowski shortly afterwards. It was not long after this that Telee left to concentrate on his own band. The Modern line up was completed, and the group started to write and perform together. They obtained got a recording contract in 2005, when they were signed to Mercury Records. The band recorded several songs with record producer Stephen Hague, with a view towards preparing for their debut album, which was tentatively going to be called 'Life in the Modern World'. The first of these songs was released as a single. "Jane Falls Down" received little airplay on commercial radio stations. but entered the UK Singles Chart at No. 35.

The group followed this with their second single, "Industry" on 6 March 2006. The song airplay on the music video channels, but due to sales irregularities, the single was disqualified from the UK Singles Chart. The band conducted UK wide tours supporting these singles. They also played the 2005 Reading and Leeds Festivals and the October 2005 Whitby Gothic Weekend, as well as the 2006 Elektrofest. In July 2006, they performed at Pride Rally's 'Prides Against Prejudice' in Trafalgar Square.

In September 2006, it was announced on the group's forum that they had parted company with Mercury Records, and that Malkowski and Robert James had left the band. The trio continued as Matinee Club. They signed to a new independent record label, Planet Clique and, in March 2007, the song "Discotheque Francais" was issued through the record label's website. Months later the band had changed record labels once again, this time moving onto Universal Music under Europa Recordings, although this was short-lived as Europa Recordings was closed down.

In October the group transferred back to Planet Clique for the digital release of "Discotheque Francais". The debut album, Modern Industry, was made available to download in December. It included a cover version of David Bowie's "Modern Love". In January 2008, the group released The Modern LP through Ninth Wave Records, albeit only in the US. It differed from the later UK release.

Matinee Club recorded a video for the American global warming awareness show, Earth Hour. In November 2008, the group reformed as The Modern, and the drummer Rees returned to the band. Signing another record deal that covered most of Asia, the band released a double album, under the same title as their US LP, in July 2009.

== Discography ==
=== Albums ===
- Modern Industry (January 2008) (UK) (download only)
- Matinee Club Present The Modern LP (January 2008) (US)
- The Modern LP (double album) (July 2009) (Asia, US and UK)

=== Singles ===
- "Industry" (download only)
- "Jane Falls Down" – (Mercury 9874798, November 2005) No. 35 UK
- "Industry" – (Mercury 9877068, March 2006)
- 'Seven Oceans' (cancelled)
- "Discotheque Francais" – (Planet Clique SSMCD004, March 2007)
- "Discotheque Francais" (October 2007)
- 'Sometimes' (cancelled)

=== EPs ===
- "Eastern Bloc" (download only)
- "The Dirty Blonde" – (Ninth Wave, US December 2007) [This release changed to The Modern LP listed above]

=== Compilations ===
- Robopop 'The Return' (December 2006 – Lucy Pierre – Planet Clique Records)
