= Stars (Dubstar song) =

Single by Dubstar

from the album Disgraceful
- Released: June 1995
- Genre: Indie pop; Europop; synth-pop
- Length: 4:12
- Label: EMI Records; Polydor
- Songwriter: Steve Hillier
- Producers: Graeme Robinson; Stephen Hague

Dubstar singles chronology
"Stars" (1995)	"Anywhere" (1995)

Music video
- "Stars" on YouTube

"Stars" is a song by English indie dance trio Dubstar, released in 1995 by EMI and Polydor as the debut single from their first album, Disgraceful (1995). The song received critical acclaim, peaking at number 40 in the UK. But after being re-released in 1996, it was far more successful, reaching number 15 on the UK Singles Chart and number 18 in Scotland, as well as number 69 on the Eurochart Hot 100. Outside Europe, the song was a hit in Israel, peaking at number-one for three weeks (which was a weekly voting chart). It received a great deal of play time in clubs and many remixes were also created. Three different music videos were produced to promote the single. Italian metal band Lacuna Coil covered it on their 2000 EP Halflife.

== Composition ==
"Stars" is written by group member Steve Hillier, and produced by Graeme Robinson and Stephen Hague. In an interview with Melody Maker in 1995, Hillier told about the lyrics, "It's definitely about being on your own and being quietly reflective. Not necessarily being lonely, but alone." He added, "It is a very self-conscious track. It deals with the fact that when you're doing anything creative, it's not so much about what you feel about the thing, nor about how many people come up and tell you how great you are, it's more about the opinions of the people you take really seriously and how much that affects you. It's like, how do you take seriously anyone who's telling you you're any good?"

Hillier reflected on the composition of the song in 2021 on www.dubstar.com

"I took a phone call in my Tyneside flat on a Thursday afternoon, the police had closed Walkers [nightclub]. I was getting ready for a special club night for the release of the latest Cure album…I’d spent weeks arranging this with a promo company based in Blackheath called Streets Ahead. It was a big deal for all parties, and now I had to tell them the club had closed.

Crestfallen, I walked down through the rain into Jesmond Dene to stare at the animals in the petting zoo and gather my thoughts. I had no idea what I would do... I decided to write 'Stars', one of the most important decisions in my career, maybe in my entire life."

== Critical reception ==
Jennifer Nine from Melody Maker named it Single of the Week and a "caress of a debut single". She added, "Vocalist Sarah Blackwood sings like a wise earthbound angel, pleading and generous and careless, and the elegant dub mixes lope along next to your heartbeat, sweatless and seductive as untroubled dreams." Another Melody Maker editors, Sharon O'Connell and Stephen Sweet, wrote, "Every once in a while an impossibly perfect pop song springs from nowhere and streaks into the stratosphere trailing gold dust in its wake. [...] It's a swoonsome mix of melancholia and joy, where lush synth updrifts and sweet guitar droplets are breathed on by haunting vocals." Pan-European magazine Music & Media commented, "Will dub make pop stars? If Portishead is the first band in that vein, then you might find the second here, though in a less ambient identity. The "sky edit" makes it a very average track though." A reviewer from Music Week gave it four out of five, writing, "The overt Pet Shop Boys overtones of Dubstar's debut can't detract from its gorgeous melody and lilting chorus. On this form, the duo are destined for great things."

Music Week editor Martin Aston wrote, "Its elegant and lush Euro-pop sound positions the band somewhere between Pet Shop Boys and St Etienne." On the 1996 re-release, a reviewer described it as "delightfully catchy". Roger Morton from NME called it "an unnervingly professional piece of seduction. [...] It's dreamy, incandescent, hummable and about as gripping as a lecture on pop history from Saint Etienne." Daisy & Havoc from the Record Mirror Dance Update noted "the slightly Deacon Blue-ish pop original", stating that "the basic slightly trippy song and vocal is a nice piece of summer outdoor dancing-in-fields material (that is if we were allowed to do such wicked things) but it does have a tendency towards the Pet Shop Boys when housed up." James Hamilton named it a "Billie Ray Martin-ish melancholy bounder" in his weekly RM dance column. Ben Knowles from Smash Hits gave it four out of five and praised it as the best track of their Disgraceful album, adding, "'Stars' has something magical and shiny, it could make grown men weep and make small men faint at Sarah's feet."

== Impact and legacy ==
In a retrospective review by AllMusic, editors Kelvin Hayes and Jon O'Brien called the song "sumptuous", "ethereal" and "layered with shimmering synths to produce an achingly beautiful ballad". In December 1995, Melody Maker ranked "Stars" number 20 in their list of "Melody Maker End Of Year Critic List 1995: Singles". NME ranked the song number 18 in their list of the Top 20 of 1995, writing, "Spearheading the New Wave Of, Er, Sounding A Bit Like Saint Etienne, 'Stars' is a none-more-wispy pop confection with a tune that can't help but bring the word 'gossamer' to mind."

== Track listing ==
- 12", UK (1995)
1. "Stars" (Sky 12" Mix)
2. "Stars" (Search & Destroy Mix)
3. "Stars" (Way Out West Mix)
4. "Stars" (Mother Dub)
5. "Stars" (Original Mix)
- CD maxi, Europe (1995)
1. "Stars" (Original Mix) — 4:12
2. "Stars" (Sky Edit) — 4:32
3. "Stars" (Mother Dub) — 6:27
4. "Stars" (Search & Destroy Full Vox Mix) — 7:35
5. "Stars" (Sweet Tooths DJs Excursion) — 6:11
- CD single (The Mixes), Europe (1996)
1. "Stars" (Original Mix) — 4:12
2. "Stars" (Motiv 8 Radio Mix) — 3:57
3. "Stars" (Sonic Star Dub) — 9:47
4. "Stars" (Way Out West Mix) — 6:13

== Charts ==
=== Weekly charts ===
Chart (1995)	Peak position
Europe (European Dance Radio)	13
Israel (Israeli Singles Chart)	1
Scotland (OCC)	35
UK Singles (OCC)	40
UK Dance (OCC)	25

Chart (1996)	Peak position
Europe (Eurochart Hot 100)	69
Scotland (OCC)	18
UK Singles (OCC)	15
UK Airplay (Music Week)	10
UK Club Chart (Music Week)	7

=== Year-end charts ===
Chart (1995)	Position
Israel (Israeli Singles Chart)	14
