= David Kendrick =

American rock drummer (born 1955)

- Also known as: DeKay
- Born: March 23, 1955 (age 71); Chicago, Illinois, U.S.
- Origin: Los Angeles, California
- Genres: Rock; new wave; electronic rock; psychedelic rock
- Occupation: Musician
- Instrument: Drums
- Years active: 1970s–present
- Member of: Xiu Xiu; The Extremophiles; The Empire of Fun; Revolushn
- Formerly of: Venus and the Razorblades; The Continental Miniatures; Bates Motel; Sparks; Gleaming Spires; Visiting Kids; Devo; The Malcolm Tent Power Duo

David Kendrick (born March 23, 1955) is an American musician who is currently a member of the experimental pop band Xiu Xiu. A former member of Gleaming Spires and Devo, he has recorded and toured with Sparks, Andy Prieboy, and Revolushn. He is based in Los Angeles, California.

== Career ==
=== Early years ===
Kendrick grew up in the Midwest just outside of Chicago. "Neither of my parents were musicians, but my dad was a sculptor and they were both big music people," Kendrick said in 2013. "So I grew up hearing everything around the house. I came of age with the British Invasion, so I was always a bit of an anglophile in that regard - the Stones, Beatles." Early on, he gravitated towards the drums, with Keith Moon and Ginger Baker as his role models. He played in several bands in the 1970s and relocated to Los Angeles in 1977 to play with Venus and the Razorblades, a punk band put together by Kim Fowley. Through a mutual friend, Fowley got in touch with Kendrick: "He called me up and gave me the shpiel," Kendrick said. "I just packed up my drums and ended up here in California. But that pretty much fell apart."

Kendrick then formed the Continental Miniatures, who had a charting single in 1978 (Billboard #90) with a cover of Dusty Springfield's "Stay Awhile." With pressure to record non-original material, the band broke up. In 1980, he joined the new wave band Bates Motel who had a small deal with Planet Records. The band's only release during its lifetime was the track "Live Among the Dancers" on Planet Records' various artists compilation album Sharp Cuts - New Music from American Bands (1980), although several demo recordings produced by Andrew Gold were released as bonus tracks on Omnivore Recordings' 2021 reissue of the first Gleaming Spires album, Songs of the Spires. On September 18, 2026, an album of live recordings, Live in LA 1980, was released on Think Like a Key Music, sourced and remastered from tapes in Kendrick's personal archive.

=== Sparks ===
In 1980, Kendrick and two other members of Bates Motel, bassist Les Bohem and guitarist Bob Haag, were recruited by brothers Ron and Russell Mael of Sparks, with whom they toured and recorded between 1981 and 1986. Bates Motel and the Mael brothers used to hang out separately at the Farmers Market in Los Angeles. "It was the only place in Los Angeles that you could get espresso and we were all coffee fiends ... and we would end up there at the same time," Kendrick said. The two bands got to know each other and soon the Mael brothers, who were without a live band at the time, went to see Bates Motel play and subsequently enlisted most of the band. Kendrick played with Sparks until they temporarily stopped touring in the late 1980s and mostly worked as a duo with an engineer in the studio thereafter.

=== Gleaming Spires ===
While playing with Sparks, Kendrick and Bohem formed the side project Gleaming Spires and had a hit with the single "Are You Ready for the Sex Girls?" from their 1981 album Songs of the Spires. The song was later featured in the films The Last American Virgin (1982) and Revenge of the Nerds (1984). "When David and I started writing together, the songs were more hard edged, pop, but written for a rock band," Bohem said in 2014. "When we did the first album, I'd been fooling around on piano for the first time and David had given me some lyrics. I had some new songs that weren’t "Batesable," and David and I wrote a bit together." After two more albums and an EP, Gleaming Spires broke up after their final album in 1985. Trouser Press wrote that the band's music went from "catchy, synthesizer-strewn silliness" to "more arty and serious" with lyrics "more bizarre than ever". The band's three albums, Songs of the Spires, Walk on Well Lighted Streets, and Welcoming a New Ice Age, were all reissued on Omnivore Recordings in 2021.

=== Devo ===
In 1987, Kendrick joined Devo, replacing their previous drummer Alan Myers, who had left the band in 1986 due to discontent with the increasing use of drum machines. "I was friends with them," Kendrick said, "and I told them, 'if you guys want to play with a real drummer, I would love to do it' ... So when they started up it was live drums again so that's the reason I did it." Kendrick's first recordings with Devo was for the soundtrack to Slaughterhouse Rock (1988), which was followed by two studio albums, Total Devo (1988) and Smooth Noodle Maps (1990), and a live album before the band broke up in 1991. Afterwards, for a period during the early 1990s, Kendrick worked for Mutato Muzika, a commercial music production studio established by Devo's Mark Mothersbaugh. In 1992, along with Mothersbaugh and others, Kendrick was nominated for a Daytime Emmy Award for "Outstanding Music Direction and Composition" for the musical television series Adventures in Wonderland. When Devo re-formed in 1996, Kendrick chose not to resume working with Devo, and was replaced by The Vandals drummer Josh Freese, although he played with the band again briefly in the mid-2000s, serving as backup drummer for shows when Freese was unavailable.

=== Xiu Xiu ===
In 2018, David Kendrick began working with experimental rock band Xiu Xiu. He first performed with the band as a separate act in August 5 that year at the Zebulon Cafe Concert in Los Angeles, along with Dynasty Handbag (the alter ego of Jibz Cameron), Lizzy Cooperman, and Elliot Reed. Another performance at the Zebulon Cafe Concert followed in September 3, this time alongside Carla Bozulich, Mate Tulipan and Father Murphy. David also played drums on the band's cover of The Chameleons' song "Less Than Human". The song was included on their Bandcamp exclusive release XMFX 6, which was released on September 19, 2020.

In 2022, Kendrick became a full member of Xiu Xiu for their thirteenth studio album Ignore Grief.

=== Other work ===
Since the mid-1980s, Kendrick was involved in the Devo-related project Visiting Kids, featuring Mark Mothersbaugh's then-wife Nancye Ferguson, Devo guitarist Bob Mothersbaugh, and Bob's daughter Alex Mothersbaugh, among others. They released a self-titled EP in 1990, which was produced by Mark Mothersbaugh and Devo keyboardist and guitarist Bob Casale, and included songs written by Kendrick and Mark Mothersbaugh. Visiting Kids appeared on the compilation album Radio Tokyo Tapes Volume 4: Women (1989) with the track "Trilobytes" and on the soundtrack to the film Rockula (1990) with "United State of Beat".

In 2003, Kendrick recorded the album Soundtrack for a Mars Movie with the Extremophiles, a short-lived band consisting of engineers and scientists from the Mars Desert Research Station, including architect, builder and musician Frank Schubert, who guested on guitar on Devo's Smooth Noodle Maps album. Soundtrack for a Mars Movie is a music project on microbes in extreme environments.

Kendrick founded the long running musical collective the Empire of Fun, a studio project which records self-described "concept projects". With a core of Kendrick and singer Steve Summers, along with many other involved musicians, the project has recorded several albums with guests such as Russell Mael (Sparks), Lisa Germano (John Mellencamp, Simple Minds), James Mankey (Sparks, Concrete Blonde), and former Wall of Voodoo singer Andy Prieboy, the latter with whom Kendrick also recorded and performed with in the late 1990s on the musical White Trash Wins Lotto, which was inspired by Guns N' Roses frontman Axl Rose. Kendrick also appeared on Prieboy's 2008 single "Shine (Red Bead Follows Blue)". In 2012, Kendrick, along with The Dils bassist Tony Kinman, appeared on Prieboy's four-song EP Every Lady Gets a Song. The trio also performed on March 2, 2014, at the Getty Center.

Since the 2010s, under the name DeKay, Kendrick has been the drummer and lyricist for psychedelic rock band Revolushn, who released their first album Dark Matter in 2014. The band also features Frank Schubert on vocals and guitar, going by the name No Mansfield, along with Antiseen bassist Malcolm Tent. Their 2020 single "Electric" features saxophonist Scott Page (Supertramp, Toto, Pink Floyd). In July 2018, Kendrick and Tent, under the name "The Malcolm Tent Power Duo", released the album Two Smooth Noodle Maps (an obvious reference to Kendrick's second and final studio album with Devo). In keeping with its title, the album consists of covers of two Smooth Noodle Maps songs - "Spin That Wheel" and "Devo Has Feelings Too". Two Smooth Noodle Maps was an extremely limited release, with only 20 copies being made.

As a songwriter, Kendrick's work has appeared on soundtracks for films like The Last American Virgin (1982), Revenge of the Nerds (1984), School Spirit (1985), The Horror Show (1989), Mannequin Two: On the Move (1991), and Cabin Fever 2: Spring Fever (2009).

== Personal life ==
Kendrick is married and has a child who is a guitar player.

Outside of music, Kendrick's interests include film noir, psychedelia, hauntology, libraries, trickster mythology, and crime fiction. As an avid collector, he has a collection of over 1,000 film noir films from around the world and a huge collection of condoms acquired while touring worldwide with Devo. He also collects odd art and some of his acquisitions have appeared in Diane Keaton's 2002 book Clown Paintings.

== Selected discography ==
=== The Continental Miniatures ===
- The Continental Miniatures (1979)

=== Gleaming Spires ===
- Songs of the Spires (1981)
- Life Out on the Lawn (EP) (1982)
- Walk on Well Lighted Streets (1983)
- Party E.P. (1984)
- Welcoming a New Ice Age (1985)

=== Sparks ===
- Whomp That Sucker (1981)
- Angst in My Pants (1982)
- In Outer Space (1983)
- Pulling Rabbits Out of a Hat (1984)
- Music That You Can Dance To (1986)

=== Devo ===
- Total Devo (1988)
- Now It Can Be Told: DEVO at the Palace (1989)
- Smooth Noodle Maps (1990)

=== Visiting Kids ===
- Visiting Kids (1990)

=== The Extremophiles ===
- Soundtrack for a Mars Movie (2003)

=== The Empire of Fun ===
- The Blue Head
- Classics of Enduring Elegance
- It Looks Like Today Outside
- Jeepers!
- I'm Sorry Mr. Kendrick, There's a Skull Inside Your Head (2006)
- Crime, Memory and Loss (2015)
- CANdYPIE 2000

=== Josie Cotton ===
- Invasion of the B-Girls (2007)

=== Glen Meadmore ===
- Hot Horny and Born Again (1998, recorded 1993)
- Cowboy Songs for Lil Hustlers

=== Beth Hart ===
- Beth Hart and the Ocean of Souls (2009) - Recorded in 1993

=== Revolushn ===
- Dark Matter (2014)
- The Freshman (2016)
- Further!! (2017)

=== Xiu Xiu ===
- Ignore Grief (2023)
- 13" Frank Beltrame Italian Stiletto with Bison Horn Grips (2024)
