= A Strange Education =

Studio album by The Cinematics
- Released: 5 March 2007
- Recorded: Real World Studios; Bryn Derwen Studios
- Genre: Indie rock, post-punk revival
- Length: 57:15
- Label: TVT Records
- Producer: Stephen Hague

The Cinematics chronology
Break EP (2006)	A Strange Education (2007)	Love and Terror (2009)

Singles from A Strange Education
- 1. "Chase" Released: 10 October 2005; 2. "Break" Released: 27 March 2006; 3. "Keep Forgetting" Released: 26 March 2007; 4. "Maybe Someday" / "A Strange Education" Released: January 2008 (promo only)

Professional ratings
Review scores
Source	Rating
AllMusic	3/5 stars

A Strange Education is the debut album from the Scottish indie rock band The Cinematics. The album was released by TVT Records on 5 March 2007 in the United Kingdom and a day later in the United States.

== Promotion ==
The album was promoted by two singles. The lead single, "Chase" appeared on the Transporter 2 soundtrack. The video for The Cinematics' second single, "Break", featured a guest appearance by Chris Cain, bassist from Californian band We Are Scientists.

The track "Rise and Fall" appeared in the 2011 Hollywood box office hit What's Your Number?, starring Anna Farris, Chris Evans and Martin Freeman.

== Track listing ==
All songs written by The Cinematics, except "Sunday Sun" written by Beck.

1. "Race to the City" – 3:52
2. "Break" – 4:01
3. "A Strange Education" – 5:24
4. "Human" – 4:27
5. "Chase" – 4:14
6. "Rise & Fall" – 4:50
7. "Sunday Sun" – 4:02
8. "Keep Forgetting" – 3:58
9. "Ready Now" – 4:22
10. "Maybe Someday" – 3:23
11. "Alright" – 4:08
12. "Asleep at the Wheel" – 6:05
13. "Home" (Hidden Track) – 4:29
14. "Box" (iTunes Bonus Track) – 4:15

== Personnel ==
The Cinematics

- Scott Rinning – lead vocals, guitar
- Ross Bonney – drums
- Ramsay Miller – lead guitar
- Adam Goemans – bass guitar

Technical personnel

- Stephen Hague – production
- Simon Barnicott – production
- Leonard B. Johnson - A&R
