= Gleaming Spires =

American new wave pop group

- David Kendrick (left) and Leslie Bohem (right)

Background information
- Genres: New wave
- Years active: 1981–1985
- Labels: Posh Boy, PVC, The Vodka Label, Tabb, Omnivore Recordings
- Past members: Leslie Bohem; David Kendrick; Bob Haag; Jim "Jimbo" Goodwin; Greg Penny

Gleaming Spires was an American new wave pop group in the 1980s.

== Background ==
Performing as Bates Motel, they were enlisted by brothers Ron and Russell Mael to be a part of the 1981–85 incarnation of their band, Sparks. After completing demos with neophyte producer Stephen Hague, principal members Leslie Bohem and David Kendrick (later of Devo, Xiu Xiu) recruited fellow Sparks members Jim Goodwin and Bob Haag to form Gleaming Spires with the blessing of the Mael brothers.

Following promotional materials by graphic artist Kevin J. Walker (who designed punk band covers for T.S.O.L. and Channel 3, among others), they were signed to Posh Boy Records on the strength of what had been intended by the group as a non-LP B-side, "Are You Ready for the Sex Girls?". "Sex Girls" became a hit on Los Angeles' KROQ-FM radio station and was later featured in the films The Last American Virgin and Revenge of the Nerds, the latter of which also featured the Gleaming Spires song "All Night Party". The cover art for Gleaming Spires' Walk on Well Lighted Streets album was designed by artist Mark Kostabi, who later went on to design album covers for Guns N' Roses (Use Your Illusion) and the Ramones (¡Adios Amigos!).

Though the band's three studio albums were not issued on CD until 2021, "Are You Ready for the Sex Girls?" has been featured on numerous various artists compilation albums, including Rhino Records' Just Can't Get Enough: New Wave Hits of the '80s, Volume 3. In 2014, the Gleaming Spires' debut album, Songs of the Spires, was remastered and reissued on 180-gram LP by the Futurismo Inc. label, in two different color variations ("Lemon Meringue" and "Blue Movie"). The package was housed in a gloss laminate sleeve, featuring new artwork from original illustrations by artist Kevin J. Walker, and included an Artzine booklet, as well as one bonus track, "Walk Right".

On September 17, 2021, the band's three studio albums, Songs of the Spires, Walk on Well Lighted Streets, and Welcoming a New Ice Age, were reissued on CD and streaming services, each containing a myriad of bonus tracks and memorabilia (including the Life Out on the Lawn and Party EPs) by Omnivore Recordings.

== Members ==
- Leslie Bohem – lead vocals, bass guitar, acoustic guitar, synthesizers
- David Kendrick – drums, percussion

=== Other members ===
- Bob Haag – guitars, background vocals
- Jim "Jimbo" Goodwin – keyboards, alto saxophone
- Greg Penny – synthesizers, guitars, background vocals

=== Additional musicians ===
- Paul Cutler – guitar
- Stephen Hague – synthesizer, producer
- "The Horns of Desire" – Bobby Moore (saxophone), Dana Wylie (trumpets)
- "The Passionettes" (background vocalists) – Katia Empkowicz Penny, Patty Foley, Beau Wesley, The Happy Boy, The Party God, Fanny Penny
- Rob Goraieb – background vocals on the Funk for Children EP
- Alan D. Generes (formerly of the Bösendorfers) – percussion

== Discography ==
=== Albums ===
- Songs of the Spires (1981)
- Walk on Well Lighted Streets (1983)
- Welcoming a New Ice Age (1985)

=== Extended plays ===
- Life Out on the Lawn (1982)
- Party EP (aka the Funk for Children EP) (1984)
