= Make It Better =

Studio album by Dubstar
- Released: 28 August 2000
- Studio: Steve Hillier's house, Lansdowne, Brighton; Hove and Newcastle Arts Centre, Newcastle-upon-Tyre
- Genre: Synthpop, alternative dance
- Length: 47:58
- Label: Food (through EMI)
- Producer: Dubstar, Mike "Spike" Drake

Dubstar chronology
Goodbye (1997)	Make It Better (2000)	Stars: The Best of Dubstar (2004)

Make It Better is the third studio album by British dance-pop band Dubstar. It was released August 2000 on Food, and spawned two singles: "I (Friday Night)" and "The Self Same Thing". The single "I (Friday Night) was released in the UK on 1 May. Some releases of Make It Better exclude the tenth and thirteenth tracks, "New Friends" and "Stay Together", respectively. Make It Better was recorded at Steve Hillier's house in Lansdowne, Brighton, Hove and the Newcastle Arts Centre in Newcastle-upon-Tyre, with the band and Mike "Spike" Drake (who also mixed the recordings) acting as producers.

== Reception ==
Professional ratings
Review scores
Source	Rating
AllMusic	3/5 stars
Lancashire Telegraph	9/10
The List	3/5 stars
NME	3/5 stars

Writing for AllMusic, Dean Carlson found the album very pop orientated. He praised the first three tracks, noting the new use of crunching guitars and rough beats. However, he felt the following tracks were lacklustre.

== Track listing ==
All songs written by Steve Hillier, music by Hillier and Chris Wilkie, except where noted.

1. "Take It" – 3:13
2. "I" – 2:51
3. "The Self Same Thing" – 3:26
4. "Mercury" (Kirsty Hawkshaw) – 4:07
5. "Stay" – 3:44
6. "Another Word" (lyrics: Sarah Blackwood, Wilkie; music: Hillier, Wilkie) – 4:11
7. "When the World Knows Your Name" – 3:33
8. "Arc of Fire" – 3:56
9. "Believe in Me" – 3:43
10. "I'm Conscious of Myself" – 2:49
11. "Rise to the Top" – 2:33
12. "Swansong" – 3:33

Japanese edition track listing

1. "Take It" – 3:13
2. "I" – 2:51
3. "The Self Same Thing" – 3:26
4. "Mercury" – 4:07
5. "Stay" – 3:42
6. "Another Word" – 4:13
7. "When the World Knows Your Name" – 3:33
8. "Arc of Fire" – 3:56
9. "Believe in Me" – 3:43
10. "New Friends" – 2:26
11. "I'm Conscious of Myself" – 2:49
12. "Rise to the Top" – 2:33
13. "Stay Together" – 3:57
14. "Swansong" – 3:30

== Personnel ==
Personnel per booklet.

Dubstar

- Sarah Blackwood – vocals
- Steve Hillier – programming
- Chris Wilkie – guitar

Production and design

- Dubstar – producer
- Mike "Spike" Drake – producer, mixing
- Mat Cook – art direction
- Intro – art direction
- Zanna – photography
