= Stephen Hague =

American record producer

- Born: 1960 (age 65–66); Portland, Maine, U.S.
- Occupation: Record producer
- Years active: 1980–present

Stephen Hague is an American record producer most active with various British acts since the 1980s.

== Early life ==
Hague was born in Portland, Maine, in 1960.

== Early career ==
Hague started his musical career in the late-1970s as a session keyboardist. He soon became a member of the band Jules and the Polar Bears and produced (with Jules Shear) the two albums and one EP, released between 1978 and 1980, by that band. He then branched out into producing work by other artists, including 1980s Sparks offshoot band Gleaming Spires, their first album being recorded on Hague's home 4-track tape recorder. This 1981 album spawned the Los Angeles radio hit "Are You Ready for the Sex Girls?" on the Posh Boy label, a recording subsequently featured in Hollywood features The Last American Virgin and Revenge of the Nerds. Hague and Shear teamed up to produce both albums by new-wavers Slow Children in 1981 and 1982; Hague also co-produced Elliot Easton's (The Cars) 1985 solo album Change No Change.

== Commercial successes ==
In 1983, Hague produced the Rock Steady Crew's worldwide hit single "(Hey You) The Rock Steady Crew". He then primarily worked with British artists. Hague's first noted UK production was on Malcolm McLaren's "Madam Butterfly" single. In 1985 he produced Orchestral Manoeuvres in the Dark's album Crush and Pet Shop Boys debut album Please, on which he also got a song writing credit for the song "Love Comes Quickly" which was a top 20 hit in the UK. Hague has also worked with Public Image Ltd., New Order, Jimmy Somerville, Melanie C, James, Peter Gabriel, Dubstar, Erasure, Pretenders, Blur, Pere Ubu, Robert Palmer, a-ha, Siouxsie and the Banshees, Robbie Williams, Tom Jones and Robbie Robertson, producing the hits "So In Love", "West End Girls", "Go West", "True Faith", "Regret", "Bizarre Love Triangle", and "A Little Respect" among many others.

== Production style ==
Hague's production style has been described as a lush, layered sound with occasional jagged edges. He cites the Beach Boys, Todd Rundgren and experimental German krautrock-bands as some influences.

== Production credits ==
=== 1980s ===
Year	Artist	Title	Additional information
1980	Bob Beland	Stealing Cars b/w "I Can Walk Away"	7" single
1980	Roger Swallow	CUT	LP
1981	Slow Children	Slow Children	
1981	Gleaming Spires	Are You Ready for the Sex Girls?	Rodney On The Roq 2 compilation
1981	Gleaming Spires	Songs of the Spires	LP
1982	Bob Beland	Bob Beland	EP
1983	Gleaming Spires	Walk on Well Lighted Streets	LP
1983	Hilary	Kinetic	EP
1983	Rock Steady Crew	(Hey You) The Rock Steady Crew	album co-written and produced
1984	World's Famous Supreme Team	Hey! DJ	co-written and produced
1984	Malcolm McLaren	Madam Butterfly (Un Bel Di Vedremo)	co-written and produced
1984	Andy Pratt	Fun in the First World	
1985	Orchestral Manoeuvres in the Dark	Crush	co-written and produced
1985	Andy Pratt	Not Just for Dancing	now "Age of Goodbye"
1986	Pet Shop Boys	Please	Producer
1986	Orchestral Manoeuvres in the Dark	The Pacific Age	producer
1986	Pete Shelley	Heaven & the Sea	producer
1987	New Order	True Faith 1963	producer
1987	Pet Shop Boys	Actually	"What Have I Done to Deserve This?", "King's Cross" producer
1987	Communards	Red	producer
1987	Various Artists	Some Kind of Wonderful	producer
1988	The Apartments	The Shyest Time	
1988	Climie Fisher	Everything	producer
1988	Erasure	The Innocents	producer
1988	Jane Wiedlin	Fur	producer
1989	Pere Ubu	Cloudland	producer
1989	Holly Johnson	Blast	"Love Train" & "Heaven's Here"
1989	New Order	Round & Round	7" & 12" single versions
1989	Public Image Ltd.	9	producer

=== 1990s ===
Year	Artist	Title	Additional information
1990	Jimmy Somerville	Read My Lips	producer
1990	Marc Almond	A Lover Spurned	Single from the album Enchanted
1990	New Order	World in Motion	producer
1990	Robbie Robertson	Storyville	co-producer
1991	Banderas	This Is Your Life	producer
1991	Siouxsie and the Banshees	Superstition	producer
1991	Chapterhouse	Falling Down	co-producer
1991	Electronic	Feel Every Beat	single, additional production and remix
1991	Pet Shop Boys	DJ Culture	single, additional production and mix of 7”
1992	Electronic	Disappointed	single, additional production and mix of 7”
1993	One Dove	Morning Dove White	producer
1993	New Order	Republic	co-producer
1993	The Other Two	The Other Two & You	co-producer
1993	Morten Harket	Can't Take My Eyes Off You	producer
1993	Pet Shop Boys	Very	additional production and mix
1993	Andy Bell & k.d. lang	No More Tears (Enough is Enough)	Released on Coneheads Soundtrack
1994	Blur	To The End	producer
1995	Papa Wemba	Emotion	producer
1995	Dubstar	Disgraceful	co-produced with Graeme Robinson
1995	Jimmy Somerville	Heartbeat Hurt So Good	producer
1995	Gregory Gray	Euroflake in Silverlake	producer
1995	Frances Ruffelle	God Watch Over You	single
1996	Robbie Williams	Freedom	producer
1996	Dicte	Voodoo Vibe	producer
1996	Manic Street Preachers	Everything Must Go	Australia and The Girl Who Wanted To Be God
1997	Dubstar	Goodbye	producer
1997	James	Whiplash	co-produced with Brian Eno
1997	ManBREAK	Come and See	producer
1997	Sarah Cracknell	Anymore	producer
1998	Ace of Base	Cruel Summer	co-producer
1998	Pretenders	Viva el Amor	producer
1999	Technique	Pop Philosophy	producer
1999	Tom Jones	Reload	produced or co-produced five of seventeen tracks

=== 2000-present ===
Year	Artist	Title	Additional information
2001	Afro Celt Sound System	Volume 3: Further in Time	co-producer
2001	Closer to Heaven Original London Cast	Closer to Heaven (Original Cast Recording)	co-produced with Pet Shop Boys
2002	a-ha	Lifelines	producer
2004	Peter Gabriel	Up	co-produced with Peter Gabriel
2005	The Modern	Life In A Modern World	unreleased album (see Matinée Club below)
2005	David Mead	Wherever You Are	EP
2007	Client	Heartland	few songs
2007	The Cinematics	"A Strange Education"	co-producer
2007	Melanie C	This Time	"What If I Stay", "Forever Again", "Don't Let Me Go", "Immune", "May Your Heart", "I Want Candy"
2007	Melanie C	Understand (remix)	
2007	Matinée Club	Modern Industry	digital release of 12 tracks from "Life In A Modern World" (see The Modern above)
2008	Peter Gabriel and Various Artists	Big Blue Ball	co-produced with Peter Gabriel
2008	Fryars		singles
2009	Robbie Williams		additional production
2010	Akira the Don	The Life Equation	co-producer
2011	Joseph Arthur		co-producer
2011	Claudia Brücken	The Lost Are Found	producer
2012	Creature	Sick Imagination	producer
2012	Low Sea	Remote Viewing	
2013	Tristen	Caves	album producer
2014	James Varnish	V	EP
2016	Tommy MV$ERVTI	The Trailer Park Singles EP	co-produced single "heather's song" with Malcolm McLaren
2020	Whitey	Now That's Why I Killed Music	co-producer
2022	Dubstar	Two	co-producer
2022/3	Whitey	On/Off	album
2022/3	Lizzo	About Damn Time	co-writer
2022	The Heroic Enthusiasts	Fits and Fashions EP	co-produced with The Heroic Enthusiasts
2022	The Heroic Enthusiasts	Crimes and Passions EP	co-produced with The Heroic Enthusiasts
2023	The Heroic Enthusiasts	Its A Sin (single)	co-produced with The Heroic Enthusiasts
2024	Whitey	Mental Radio	co-produced with Whitey
