= Leslie Bohem =

American screenwriter, television writer, and former bassist

- Born: Leslie Karoly Bohem; September 25, 1951 (age 74); Los Angeles, California, United States
- Occupations: Screenwriter; producer
- Parent: Endre Bohem

Leslie "Les" Bohem (born 1951) is an American screenwriter, television writer, and former bassist. He is the son of screenwriter Endre Bohem.

== Biography ==
Bohem played bass in the 1980s with the pop groups Sparks and Gleaming Spires.

Bohem's writing credits include the miniseries Taken and the films Dante's Peak, Twenty Bucks (with his father), Daylight, and The Alamo. He also wrote the storybook of the Steven Spielberg produced mini-series Nine Lives.

Bohem wrote parts of the science-fiction television series Extant, executive produced by Spielberg and created the series Shut Eye, airing on the streaming service Hulu. It was given a straight-to-series 10-episode order. All ten episodes became available on December 7, 2016. A second season was ordered on March 20, 2017 which was released on December 6, 2017.

== Filmography ==
Film writer

- House III: The Horror Show (1989)
- A Nightmare on Elm Street 5: The Dream Child (1989)
- Desperado: Badlands Justice (1989)
- Kid (1990)
- Nowhere to Run (1993)
- Twenty Bucks (1993)
- Daylight (1996)
- Dante's Peak (1997)
- The Alamo (2004)
- The Darkest Hour (2011) (Story only)
- The Map That Leads to You (2025) (screenplay)

Uncredited script work

- Jason Goes to Hell: The Final Friday (1993)
- Tracers (2015)

TV series

Year	Title	Writer	Creator	Producer	Notes
1992	The Fifth Corner	Yes	No	No	Episode "Woman at Her Toilette"
2002	Taken	Yes	Yes	Executive	Miniseries
2014–2015	Extant	Yes	No	Consulting	5 episodes
2016–2017	Shut Eye	Yes	Yes	No	20 episodes
