= Randy Klein =

- Born: September 9, 1949 (age 75); Jersey City, New Jersey, U.S.
- Genres: Piano, pop, rock, R&B, jazz, musical theatre, choral music, educational, new age
- Occupation(s): Musician, composer, pianist, author, educator
- Instrument(s): Piano, Keyboard
- Years active: 1964 – present
- Labels: Jazzheads
- Website: randyklein.com

Randy Klein (born September 9, 1949) is an American musician, composer, pianist, author, and educator.

== Music career ==
Klein was born in Jersey City, New Jersey, and grew up in Union City and Fort Lee. At 14, he performed with local rock group The Good Things and played in the Fort Lee High School marching band. He attended Berklee College of Music in Boston from 1967 to 1971. He taught at Berklee from 1971 to 1973 under the supervision of John LaPorta. He performed with singer-songwriter Ralph Graham until 1976.

In 1977, he moved to New York City and played keyboard for legendary R&B performer Millie Jackson. Klein toured with Jackson until 1980, contributing songs for her albums including Feelin' Bitchy, Get It Out'cha System, Live & Uncensored, E.S.P. (Extra Sexual Persuasion), For Men Only. Since 1981, he has contributed songs to albums by Sarah Dash, Candi Staton, IRT, Memphis Bleek, JX, Black Sheep, Lil Kim, and PBS television programs Ticktock Minutes and Sesame Street.

In 1992, Klein founded Jazzheads, an independent music label based in New York City. To date, the label has a catalog of 100+ titles with Grammy nominations, Downbeat Critics awards, and Jazz Journalist awards. He has released multiple solo piano improvisation recordings, and two albums consisting of duo performances with saxophonist Oleg Kireyev, trombonist Chris Washburne, electric bass guitarist Boris Koslov, and guitarist Alex Skolnick.

He is the winner of Gold Records for songs recorded by Polydor recording artist Millie Jackson. He has won four Southern Regional Emmy Awards - "Outstanding Achievement: Individual Excellence - Composer" for his original score to the PBS film-documentary Richard Wright (Black Boy), and three "Outstanding Collaborative Achievement - Composer" awards for his work on Ticktock Minutes (PBS). Ticktock Minutes also won the 1998 National Emmy Award for Best Public Service Announcement.

In 2017, his composition Fanfare For Jerusalem premiered at The Metropolitan Opera. He is the composer of For My People, a song cycle featuring the poetry of American author Margaret Walker. His compositions, Facing It (based on the poetry of Yusef Komunyakaa) and Dear John, Dear Coltrane (based on the poetry of Michael Harper) premiered at the 2014 Furious Flower Poetry Conference featuring the combined James Madison University and Morgan State Chorales.

His documentary film scores include: National Emmy Award winner Free To Dance (PBS Great Performances) and National Emmy Award winner Beyond Tara – The Extraordinary Life Of Hattie McDaniel (American Movie Classics) and Richard Wright – Black Boy (PBS/BBC production). His music can be heard at the Burial Ground Museum in lower Manhattan and at the Civil Rights Museum in Greensboro, NC.

His musical theater works include composing music for Fancy Nancy ‘Splendiferous’ Christmas (based on the popular Fancy Nancy book series by Jane O'Connor, illustrated by Robin Preiss Glasser) at the Vital Musical Theatre, NYC 2014 – 2016, Music for Twinkle Tames A Dragon at the Vital Musical Theatre (based on the children's book series by Katharine Holabird), NYC 2016 – 2017. He wrote music to Flambe Dreams, which has been performed in readings and workshops since 2006, and Ever Happily After – 2013 New York Musical Theatre Festival (NYMF).

In 2017, Klein authored The Quickstart Guide to Writing a Song, an educational manual on songwriting. He has also been published by American Songwriter Magazine (The Star Spangled Banner Is Not A Song, Or Is It?), and Music Alive magazine (Can You Ear It?).

== Discography ==
- While I Was Waiting (1986)
- Spacial Glacier (1986)
- Randy Klein's Jazzheads (1993)
- Love Notes From The Bass with Harvie Swartz (1994)
- Underground Romantic (1998)
- Just My Imagination (1998)
- Invitation In (2004)
- Piano Christmas! (2005)
- The Flowing (2008)
- Sunday Morning with Chris Washburne and Oleg Kireyev (2010)
- What's Next with Alex Skolnick and Boris Kozlov (2012)
- Fancy Nancy Splendiferous Christmas Original Cast Album (2015)
- Kleinway@Steinway (2016)

== Selected credits ==
- Millie Jackson - Feelin' Bitchy (Southbound, 1977)
- Millie Jackson - Get It Out'cha System (Spring/Polydor/PolyGram Records, 1978)
- Candi Staton - Candi Staton (Warner Bros., 1980)
- Millie Jackson - For Men Only (Polydor/PolyGram, 1980)
- Millie Jackson - E.S.P. (Extra Sexual Persuasion) (Sire/Warner Bros., 1983)
- Mud, Sweat, and Jeers - Every Dawg Has Its Day (RCA, 1985)
- IRT - Watch The Closing Doors (RCA, 1985)
- IRT - Made In The USA (RCA, 1985)
- IRT - When Bad Things Happen (RCA, 1985)
- Sarah Dash - You're All I Need (EMI, 1988)
- Black Sheep - A Wolf In Sheep's Clothing (Mercury/PolyGram, 1991)
- Sesame Street - Rhyming Tap Rap featuring Savion Glover (PBS, 1991)
- JX - Close To Your Heart (Motor Music, 1997)
- Millie Jackson - Totally Unrestricted! the Millie Jackson Anthology (Rhino/Atlantic Records, 1997)
- Ticktock Minutes (PBS, 1995-2001)
- Millie Jackson - Sex And Soul (House Of Hits/BMG, 2000)
- Memphis Bleek - 534 (Roc-A-Fella/IDJMG/Universal, 2005)
- Lil' Kim - The Naked Truth (Atlantic, 2005)
- Michael Earl Sings Songs About Famous People (King Kozmo, 2015)
