= A Matter of Fact (album) =

Studio album by Facts of Life
- Released: 1978
- Label: RCA
- Producer: Millie Jackson

Facts of Life chronology
| Sometimes (1977) | A Matter of Fact (1978) |

A Matter of Fact is the second and last album by soul/disco trio Facts of Life. Produced by Millie Jackson, the album features a cover of Larry Santos' pop tune, "We Can't Hide It Anymore".

== Track listing ==
1. "Did He Make Love to You" (Harvey Scales, Melvin Griffin)
2. "We Can't Hide It Anymore" (Barry Murphy)
3. "He Ain't You" (Bradley Burg, Dene Hofheinz Mann, Jeff Barry, Lisa Hartman)
4. "Do You Wanna Make Love" (Peter McCann)
5. "I'm Way Ahead of You" (Curly Putman, Sonny Throckmorton)
6. "You Always Get Your Way" (Bernard Ighner, Sondra Catton)
7. "It's Only a Matter of Time" (Joe Shamwell)
8. "This Ain't No Time to Sleep Apart" (Doug Flett, Guy Fletcher)
9. "Dr. Feelgood" (Barry Goldberg, Gerry Goffin)
