= It Hurts So Good (album) =

Studio album by Millie Jackson
- Released: 1973
- Studio: Mediasound, New York City; Muscle Shoals, Sheffield
- Genre: Soul
- Length: 36:26
- Label: Spring
- Producer: Brad Shapiro; Raeford Gerald

Millie Jackson chronology
Millie Jackson (1972)	It Hurts So Good (1973)	I Got To Try It One Time (1974)

Singles from It Hurts So Good
- 1. "Breakaway" Released: March 1973; 2. "It Hurts So Good" Released: August 1973

Professional ratings
Review scores
Source	Rating
Allmusic	3/5 stars
Christgau's Record Guide	B

It Hurts So Good is the second album by American singer-songwriter Millie Jackson.

== Track listings ==
1. "I Cry" (Gary Byrd, Raeford Gerald) 4:12
2. "Hypocrisy" (Millie Jackson, Victor Davis) 2:14
3. "Two-Faced World" (Johanna Hall, John Hall) 2:50
4. "It Hurts So Good" (Phillip Mitchell) 3:07
5. "Don't Send Nobody Else" (Nick Ashford, Valerie Simpson) 3:22
6. "Hypocrisy (Reprise)" 2:00
7. "Good To The Very Last Drop" (Billy Nichols) 3:49
8. "Help Yourself" (Brad Shapiro, Robert Pucetti) 3:05
9. "Love Doctor" (Jackie Avery) 2:55
10. "Now That You Got It" (Thom Bridwell) 2:33
11. "Close My Eyes" (Billy Nicholls) 3:12
12. "Breakaway (Reprise)" (Raeford Gerald) 1:56

== Personnel ==
- Mike Lewis – arranger, conductor
- Raeford Gerald – arranger, producer
- Brad Shapiro – arranger, conductor, producer
- Lew Delgatto, Tony Camillo – orchestrations

== Charts ==
Chart (1973)	Peak position
Billboard Top Soul Albums	13

=== Singles ===
Year	Single	Chart positions	
Year	Single	US Pop	US Soul
1973	"It Hurts So Good"	24	3
1973	"Breakaway"	–	16
