= You Are Everything I Need =

Studio album by Larry Santos
- Released: 1976
- Label: Casablanca
- Producer: Don Davis

Larry Santos chronology
Larry Santos (1975)	You Are Everything I Need (1976)	Don't Let the Music Stop (1977)

You Are Everything I Need is the fifth album by American pop singer/songwriter/pianist Larry Santos, released in 1976 on Casablanca Records. This follow-up also features "Early in the Morning", I Don't Know Why", a cover of Linda Ronstadt's 1970 tune, "Long, Long Time", written by Gary White and "We Can't Hide It Anymore". It was also produced by Detroit soul producer Don Davis.

== Track listing ==
All songs written by Larry Santos except where noted.

1. "You Are Everything I Need"
2. "If I Never See Mary Again" (Larry Santos, Dan Yessian)
3. "I Don't Know Why"
4. "Loving Woman"
5. "We Can't Hide It Anymore" (Barry Murphy)
6. "Long, Long Time" (Gary White)
7. "Early in the Morning"
8. "Can't Get You Off My Mind" (Iran Koster, Teddy Randazzo, Victoria Pike)
9. "Meet Me Tonight" (Teddy Randazzo, Iran Koster, Victoria Pike)

== Notes ==
- On the original L.P., track 4 was originally "Lovin' Woman"
- On the original L.P., track 7 was originally "Early in the Mornin'"

== Personnel ==
- Keyboards - Barry Beckett, Larry Santos, Earl Van Dyke, Rudy Robinson
- Guitar - Bobby Goodsite, Eddie Hinton, Eddie Willis, Jimmy Johnson, Robert White, Norman Warner, Pete Carr
- Bass - David Hood, Roderick Chandler, Patrick Burrows
- Drums - Roger Hawkins, Ken Krogol, Richard Allen
- ARP Synthesizer - Larry Santos
- Backing Vocals - Honey
- Arranged by - Bobby Eaton
- Art Direction and Design by Gribbitt!
- Engineer - Ellis Bishop
- Engineer, Remix - Jim Vitti, Ken Sands
- Mastered by Allen Zentz
- Photography by Gerald Farber
- Produced and remixed by Don Davis
- Strings arranged by Detroit Fisher Theatre Strings
- Horns arranged by Carl Austin
