= Back to the S**t! =

1989 live album by Millie Jackson

Live album by Millie Jackson
- Released: May 25, 1989
- Recorded: January 13-14, 1989
- Venue: Blues Alley (Baltimore)
- Genre: R&B; comedy
- Length: 44:24
- Label: Jive
- Producer: Millie Jackson

Millie Jackson chronology
The Tide Is Turning (1988)	Back to the S**t! (1989)	Young Man, Older Woman (1991)

Back to the S**t! is the third live album by the American R&B singer Millie Jackson. Jive Records released the album on May 26, 1989. Recorded on January 13 and 14, 1989, at the Blues Alley in Baltimore, the album features performances of three songs from Jackson's studio album An Imitation of Love, six original songs, and a cover of The Shirelles's "Will You Love Me Tomorrow". It received a mixed reception from music critics. The album was reissued in 1995 with new artwork under the title Hot! Wild! Unrestricted!

It is notable for its cover, which features Jackson sitting on a toilet with a pair of panties down to her ankles, with a strained expression on her face.

== Artwork ==
When asked about the album's artwork, Jackson stated: "It's like you gotta go all the way or no way at all".

== Critical reception ==
Professional ratings
Review scores
Source	Rating
AllMusic	3/5 stars

Ron Wynn of AllMusic claimed that Jackson "sounded more vibrant, inspired, and humorous than she had in years." Billboard opined that the album was not as noteworthy as Jackson's previous output; however, it highlighted "I'm Waiting Baby" and "Will You Love Me Tomorrow" as standouts. Music & Media claimed that the album's "arrangements are a bit slick in places, [but] this is sufficiently compensated by Jackson's uncompromising performance."

== Track listing ==
Back to the S**t! track listing
No.	Title	Writer(s)	Length
1.	"Hot! Wild! Unrestricted! Crazy Love"	Millie Jackson; Timmy Allen	4:22
2.	"Getting to Know Me"	Jackson	2:56
3.	"An Imitation of Love"	Jackson; Jonathan Butler; Jolyon Skinner	4:52
4.	"Love Stinks"	Jackson	6:24
5.	"Muffle That Fart"	Jackson	3:49
6.	"I'm Waiting Baby"	Jackson	3:14
7.	"Will You Love Me Tomorrow"	Carole King; Gerry Goffin	5:30
8.	"Investigative Reporting"	Jackson	3:47
9.	"Love Is a Dangerous Game"	Wayne Brathwaite; Butler; Billy Ocean; Skinner	2:28
10.	"Sho Nuff Danjus"	Jackson	7:02
Total length:			44:24

=== Notes ===
- All tracks are produced by Millie Jackson.
- All tracks are subtitled "live" on streaming services.

== Personnel ==
Credits are adapted from the liner notes of Back to the S**t!.

Musicians

- Millie Jackson – lead vocals
- George Moreland – drums
- Harold Small – keyboards
- Paul Wright Jr. – keyboards
- Robert Latham – guitar
- Rodney Johnson – guitar
- Linwood Burns – bass
- Tommy Mays – saxophone
- McNeal Anderson – trumpet
- Al "Zcar" BreVard – trombone
- Keisha Jackson – background vocals
- Valerie Vardell – background vocals
- Vicki Hampton – background vocals
- Herkimer Steeel – strings, congas (7)

Technical

- Timmy Reppert – engineering
- David Dachinger – mixing
- Pietro Alfieri – packaging design
- Douglas Rowell – photography
- Gloria Grant – make-up artist
- Vincent Shelley – styling

== Charts ==
Weekly chart performance for Back to the S**t!
Chart (1989)	Peak position
US Top R&B/Hip-Hop Albums (Billboard)	79

== Release history ==
Release dates and format(s) for Back to the S**t!
Region	Date	Format(s)	Label	Edition	Ref.
United Kingdom	July 3, 1989	Cassette; CD; LP	Jive	Standard	
