= Sometimes (Facts of Life album) =

Studio album by Facts of Life
- Released: 1977
- Genre: Soul
- Label: Kayvette
- Producer: Millie Jackson

Facts of Life chronology
Sometimes (1977)	A Matter of Fact (1978)

Professional ratings
Review scores
Source	Rating
AllMusic	3/5 stars
The New Rolling Stone Record Guide	2/5 stars

Sometimes is the debut album by the disco/soul band Facts of Life. It features the title cut, which is a cover of Bill Anderson's tune. It was produced by Millie Jackson.

== Critical reception ==
AllMusic wrote: "If you like deep soul with a country flavor, this isn't bad, but their lineup forces comparisons to the Soul Children, and given a choice, the latter is preferred."

== Track listing ==
1. "Sometimes" (Bill Anderson)
2. "Caught in the Act (Of Getting On)" (Carl Hampton, Homer Banks)
3. "Bitter Woman" (George Jackson, Raymond Moore)
4. "Lost Inside of You" (Barbra Streisand, Leon Russell)
5. "Looks Like We Made It" (Richard Kerr, Will Jennings)
6. "A Hundred Pounds of Pain" (Lenny Welch, Rose Marie McCoy)
7. "Uphill Places of Mind" (Frederick Knight)
8. "What Would Your Mama Say" (George Jackson, Raymond Moore)
9. "Givin' Me Your Love" (King Sterling, Millie Jackson)
10. "That Kind of Fire" (J. Norman Scott)
11. "Love Is The Final Truth" (Vaughn Harper)
