= A Moment's Pleasure =

Studio album by Millie Jackson,
- Released: 1979
- Recorded: 1979
- Studio: Muscle Shoals Sound Studios, Sheffield, Alabama; Sterling Sound, New York City, New York; Sound Suite, Detroit, Michigan; Sound Shop, Nashville, Tennessee
- Genre: Soul, Disco
- Length: 42:10
- Label: Spring Records
- Producer: Brad Shapiro; Millie Jackson

Millie Jackson, chronology
Get It Out'cha System (1978)	A Moment's Pleasure (1979)	Royal Rappin's (1979)

Professional ratings
Review scores
Source	Rating
AllMusic	3/5 stars
Christgau's Record Guide	B
The Virgin Encyclopedia of R&B and Soul	3/5 stars
DownBeat	4/5 stars

A Moment's Pleasure is a 1979 album by R&B musician Millie Jackson. It peaked at #47 on the Top R&B/Hip-Hop Albums and #144 on The Billboard 200 chart. It includes the singles "Never Change Lovers In The Middle of the Night", "Kiss You All Over" and the title track.

== Track listing ==
1. "Never Change Lovers In The Middle of the Night" (Keith Forsey, Mats Björklund)
2. "Seeing You Again" (Brad Shapiro, Millie Jackson)
3. "Kiss You All Over" (Mike Chapman, Nicky Chinn)
4. "A Moment's Pleasure" (George Jackson)
5. "What Went Wrong Last Night Pt.1" (Brad Shapiro, Millie Jackson)
6. "What Went Wrong Last Night Pt.2" (Brad Shapiro, Millie Jackson)
7. "Rising Cost of Love" (Bobby Martin, Zane Grey, Len Ron Hanks)
8. "We Got To Hit It Off" (Benny Latimore)
9. "Once You've Had It" (Brad Shapiro, Millie Jackson)

== Personnel ==
- Brad Shapiro, Millie Jackson, The Muscle Shoals Sound Band - rhythm arrangements
- David Van DePitte - string and horn arrangements
- Brandye - backing vocals

== Charts ==
Chart (1979)	Peak position
Billboard Pop Albums	144
Billboard Top Soul Albums	47

=== Singles ===
Year	Single	Chart positions	
Year	Single	US Pop	US Soul
1979	"We Got To Hit It Off"	-	56
1979	"Never Change Lovers In The Middle Of The Night"	-	33
1979	"A Moment's Pleasure"	-	70
