= By Your Side (Jimmy Somerville song) =

Single by Jimmy Somerville

from the album Dare to Love
- B-side: "Nothing Said, Nothing Done"
- Released: September 1995
- Genre: Pop
- Length: 4:43
- Label: London
- Songwriters: Matt Rowe; Jimmy Somerville; Richard Stannard
- Producers: Jimmy Somerville; Richard Stannard; Matt Rowe

Jimmy Somerville singles chronology
"Hurt So Good" (1995)	"By Your Side" (1995)	"Safe" (1997)

Audio
- "By Your Side" on YouTube

"By Your Side" is a song from Scottish singer-songwriter Jimmy Somerville, released in September 1995 by London Records as the third and final single from his second solo album, Dare to Love (1995). The song was written and produced by Matt Rowe, Somerville and Richard Stannard. It peaked at number 41 on the UK Singles Chart and became a number-one hit in Israel.

== Background ==
The song was released as the follow-up single to the two previous singles from the album; "Heartbeat" and "Hurt So Good". Both of the songs had entered the UK Top 25, whereas "By Your Side" debuted and peaked at No. 41, before dropping to No. 75 for its second and final week in the Top 100.

In 1996, a live version of the song appeared on the promotional European album Coca-Cola Planet Live!, released via Austereo MCM. In 2009, Somerville released the studio album Suddenly Last Summer, which featured Somerville performing interpretations of his favorite tracks, picked from his own iPod playlist. On the stripped-down acoustic covers album, a new version of "By Your Side" was included.

== Release ==
The single was released in the UK and Europe only, on 12" vinyl and CD via London Recordings. The CD release of the single featured "By Your Side (Radio Edit)" as the featured track, whilst three other songs were added. The song "Nothing Said, Nothing Done" was written by Gary Butcher and Somerville, whilst Chuck Norman and Gary Wilkinson produced the track. It was exclusive to the single until 2012, when it was included as a bonus track on the Edsel Records deluxe edition of Dare to Love. The other two tracks were "By Your Side (The Shining Mix)", remixed by Biff & Memphis (Rowe and Stannard under a pseudonym), and "By Your Side (Miss You Like Crazy Mix)", which was remixed by Space Kittens. The two remixes last over seven minutes each.

The 12" vinyl release featured "By Your Side (The Shining Mix)" as the main track, which was remixed by Rowe and Stannard, whilst the B-side was "By Your Side (Miss You Like Crazy Mix)". In the UK, a promotional 12" vinyl was also issued which featured the same tracks as the main 12" vinyl release.

The single featured artwork with photography by Donald Christie. The artwork featured Somerville standing in tall grass during the night with his arms wide as he looks up to the sky. The sleeve design was created by Andrew Biscomb and Peter Barrett who also designed the Dare to Love album artwork.

Following the song's original release on the Dare to Love album and as a single, it has also appeared on the 2009 Music Club Deluxe compilation For a Friend: The Best of Bronski Beat, The Communards & Jimmy Somerville.

== Promotion ==
Like the Dare to Love album's other single releases, the "By Your Side" single had a music video produced to promote it. The video did not feature Somerville.

== Critical reception ==
Upon its release as a single, John Robinson of NME remarked that the song features "an immaculately tasteful panpipes of the Andes tale of undying devotion with a murderously unsubtle beat cemented on for maximum inoffensivity". He added, "The more gnarly and like a pint-sized Michael Stipe Jimmy gets, the more pedestrian his records become. He needs to get away from the men in the headphones and back on the dole." Music Week noted that the "ballad mixes a Dire Straits sound with almost Sting-like vocals" and added "fans will love it anyway". Robbert Tilli of Music & Media stated, "More multi-functional than this you won't find, because such slightly dance-edged material obviously has both radio and big-town club potency – surely in the 'Miss You Like Crazy' and 'the Shining' mixes."

== Track listing ==
- 12" vinyl single
1. "By Your Side" (The Shining mix) – 7:57
2. "By Your Side" (Miss You Like Crazy mix) – 7:33
- CD single
1. "By Your Side" (radio edit) – 4:43
2. "Nothing Said, Nothing Done" – 4:29
3. "By Your Side" (The Shining mix) – 7:57
4. "By Your Side" (Miss You Like Crazy mix) – 7:33

== Charts ==
=== Weekly charts ===
Chart (1995)	Peak position
Israel (Israeli Singles Chart)	1
Scotland (OCC)	42
UK Singles (Official Charts)	41
UK Airplay (Hit Music)	58

=== Year-end charts ===
Chart (1995)	Position
Israel (Israeli Singles Chart)	34

== Personnel ==
- Lead vocals on "By Your Side" – Jimmy Somerville
- Keyboards, Programming on "By Your Side" – Matt Rowe, Richard Stannard
- Strings on "By Your Side" – Sian Bell, Sonia Slany
- Producers of "By Your Side" – Jimmy Somerville, Richard Stannard, Matt Rowe
- Additional production and remixing on "By Your Side" – Mike "Spike" Drake, Stephen Hague
- Engineers on "By Your Side" – Adrian Bushby, Henry Binns, Paul Gomersall, Sam Hardaker, Simon Gogerly
- Producers of "Nothing Said, Nothing Done" – Chuck Norman, Gary Wilkinson
- Remixers of "By Your Side (The Shining Mix)" – Biff & Memphis (Matt Rowe, Richard Stannard)
- Remixers of "By Your Side (Miss You Like Crazy Mix)" – Space Kittens
- Photography – Donald Christie
- Sleeve Design – Andrew Biscomb, Peter Barrett
- Writers of "By Your Side" – Matt Rowe, Jimmy Somerville, Richard Stannard
- Writers of "Nothing Said, Nothing Done" – Jimmy Somerville, Gary Butcher
