= It Hurts So Good =

1971 song by Katie Love and the Four Shades of Black

"It Hurts So Good" is a song written by Phillip Mitchell, and first recorded in 1971 by Katie Love and the Four Shades of Black on the Muscle Shoals Sound label. That version was not a hit, and the song was later recorded more successfully by Millie Jackson, whose 1973 recording was featured in the blaxploitation action film Cleopatra Jones. Hit versions were also recorded by Susan Cadogan and Jimmy Somerville, both titled as "Hurt So Good".

== Covers ==
=== Millie Jackson version ===
"Hurts So Good"

Single by Millie Jackson

from the album It Hurts So Good
- B-side: "Love Doctor"
- Released: 1973
- Genre: Funk; soul
- Length: 3:07
- Label: Spring Records
- Songwriter: Phillip Mitchell
- Producer: Brad Shapiro

Millie Jackson singles chronology
| "Breakaway" (1973) | "Hurts So Good" (1973) | "I Got to Try It One Time" (1974) |

American R&B and soul artist Millie Jackson's recording, named "Hurts So Good", charted at #24 on the US Billboard Hot 100 and #3 on what was then called the Billboard R&B Singles chart. It was used as the title track of her second album, It Hurts So Good (1973).

==== Charts ====
| Chart (1973) | Peak position |
|---|---|
| US Billboard Hot 100 | 24 |
| US R&B Singles (Billboard) | 3 |

=== Susan Cadogan version ===
Jamaican reggae singer Susan Cadogan released a reggae cover version of the song later that year retitled as "Hurt So Good", which featured bassist Boris Gardiner and the Zap Pow horns. It was released to little effect in Jamaica on Lee Perry's new 'Perries' record label, but was released in the UK by Dennis Harris's DIP International label. Magnet Records picked up the single and it went on to reach the top 5 of the UK Singles Chart, with Cadogan flying to London to promote the single, including a television appearance on Top of the Pops.

==== Charts ====
| Chart (1975) | Peak position |
|---|---|
| UK Singles (OCC) | 4 |

=== Jimmy Somerville version ===
"Hurt So Good"

Single by Jimmy Somerville

from the album Dare to Love
- B-side: "Love You Forever"; "Been So Long"
- Released: 8 May 1995
- Genre: Reggae fusion
- Length: 3:52
- Label: London
- Songwriter: Phillip Mitchell
- Producer: Stephen Hague

Jimmy Somerville singles chronology
| "Heartbeat" (1995) | "Hurt So Good" (1995) | "By Your Side" (1995) |

Music video
- "Hurt So Good" on YouTube

Former Bronski Beat lead singer Jimmy Somerville covered the song in 1995, titled on single as "Hurt So Good", while "Hurts So Good" on the respective album, Dare to Love (1995). It was produced by Stephen Hague and released by London Recordings, peaking at #15 on the UK Singles Chart. An accompanying video was directed by Russell Young and produced by Nick Verden for Atlas Films.

==== Critical reception ====
Pan-European magazine Music & Media wrote, "Somerville = Summer In The City. The heat-proof current single, pop reggae tune 'Hurts So Good' will escort all citizens on their way to and from the beach."

==== Charts ====
===== Weekly charts =====
| Chart (1995) | Peak position |
|---|---|
| Europe (Eurochart Hot 100) | 63 |
| Europe (European Hit Radio) | 10 |
| Germany (GfK) | 69 |
| Israel (Israeli Singles Chart) | 26 |
| Scotland (OCC) | 9 |
| UK Singles (Official Charts) | 15 |
| UK Airplay (Music Week) | 5 |
| UK Pop Tip Club Chart (Music Week) | 27 |

===== Year-end charts =====
| Chart (1995) | Position |
|---|---|
| Latvia (Latvijas Top 50) | 166 |

=== Other versions ===
- Luminites, contestants on the seventh series of Britain's Got Talent.
