= If We're Not Back in Love by Monday =

Single by Merle Haggard

from the album Ramblin' Fever
- B-side: "I Think It's Gone Forever"
- Released: March 21, 1977
- Genre: Country
- Length: 3:14
- Label: MCA
- Songwriter(s): Sonny Throckmorton, Glenn Martin
- Producer(s): Fuzzy Owen, Ken Nelson

Merle Haggard singles chronology
"Cherokee Maiden" (1976)	"If We're Not Back in Love by Monday" (1977)	"Ramblin' Fever" (1977)

"If We're Not Back in Love by Monday" is a song written by Sonny Throckmorton and Glenn Martin, and first recorded by American country music artist Merle Haggard. It was released in March 1977 as the first single from the album Ramblin' Fever. The song reached number 2 on the Billboard Hot Country Singles & Tracks chart.

== Charts ==
=== Weekly charts ===
Chart (1977)	Peak position
US Hot Country Songs (Billboard)	2
Canadian RPM Country Tracks	2

=== Year-end charts ===
Chart (1977)	Position
US Hot Country Songs (Billboard)	31

== Cover versions ==
- Later in 1977, Millie Jackson recorded a cover version (with the slightly different title "If You're Not Back In Love By Monday") for her album Feelin' Bitchy, which was released as a single and hit the Billboard Pop (#43) and R&B charts (#5).
- In 1978, the song was also recorded by Throckmorton on his debut album, Last Cheater's Waltz.
