= Dare to Love =

Studio album by Jimmy Somerville
- Released: 12 June 1995
- Genre: Synth-pop; EDM
- Label: London
- Producer: Chuck Norman; Gary Wilkinson; Stephen Hague

Jimmy Somerville chronology
The Singles Collection 1984/1990 (1990)	Dare to Love (1995)	Manage the Damage (1999)

Singles from Dare to Love
- 1. "Heartbeat" Released: January 1995; 2. "Hurt So Good" Released: May 1995; 3. "By Your Side" Released: September 1995

Professional ratings
Review scores
Source	Rating
AllMusic	3/5 stars
Robert Christgau	(dud)
NME	7/10

Dare to Love is the 1995 second solo album by Jimmy Somerville, former lead singer of the synth-pop groups Bronski Beat and The Communards.

== Track listing ==
=== CD1 ===
1. "Heartbeat" (Jimmy Somerville, Matt Rowe, Richard Stannard) - 4:25
2. "Hurts So Good" (Phillip Mitchell) - 3:52
3. "Cry" (Somerville, Gary Butcher) - 3:45
4. "Lovething" (Somerville, Butcher) - 4:33
5. "By Your Side" (Matt Rowe, Somerville, Richard Stannard) - 4:47
6. "Dare to Love" (Somerville, Butcher) - 4:02
7. "Someday We'll Be Together" (Harvey Fuqua, Jackey Beavers, Johnny Bristol) - 3:35
8. "Alright" (Somerville, Butcher) - 4:28
9. "Too Much of a Good Thing" (Jules Shear, Stephen Hague, Somerville) - 4:11
10. "A Dream Gone Wrong" (Somerville, Butcher) - 5:09
11. "Come Lately" (Somerville, Butcher) - 3:20
12. "Safe in These Arms" (Somerville, Butcher) - 4:37
13. "Because of Him" (Somerville, Butcher) - 3:15

=== 2012 re-issue bonus tracks ===
14. Heartbeat" (E-Smoove 12" Mix) – 10:35
15. "Hurts So Good" (12" Beatmasters Lovers Mix) – 4:25
16. "By Your Side" (The Shining Mix) – 9:33

=== CD2 ===
1. "Heartbeat" (Mars Plastic Mix) – 6:40
2. "Hurts So Good" (12" Steely & Clevie Dub) – 4:59
3. "Safe" (Get Far Mix) – 6:36
4. "Been So Long" (Remix) – 4:23
5. "Nothing Said, Nothing Done" (Remix) – 4:29
6. "Up and Away" – 3:11
7. "By Your Side" (Miss You Like Crazy Mix) – 7:34
8. "Cry" (BBC Unplugged Live) – 3:39
9. "Love You Forever" (Remix) – 5:12
10. "Heartbeat" (Armand's Cardiac Mix) – 8:09
11. "Hurts So Good" (12" Sly & Robbie Dub Mix) – 4:54
12. "Safe" (DJ Dovski Extended Mix) – 7:17

== Personnel ==
- Jimmy Somerville – vocals
- Carol Kenyon – backing vocals (tracks: 1, 8, 13)
- Chyna Gordon – backing vocals (tracks: 6, 10, 12)
- Geoffrey Williams – backing vocals (tracks: 1, 3, 7, 8, 13)
- Matthew David – backing vocals (tracks: 2–4, 7, 9)
- Paul Lewis – backing vocals (tracks: 1–4, 6, 9, 10, 12)
- Phil Spalding – bass (tracks: 1, 6–8, 10, 12, 13)
- Jeremy Meehan – bass (track: 3)
- Andy Duncan – drums (tracks: 6 to 8, 12, 13), percussion (tracks: 1–4, 10, 12)
- David Beebe – drums (tracks: 2, 3, 10)
- Gary Butcher – guitar (tracks: 3, 6, 8, 10, 12)
- Glenn Nightingale – guitar (track: 2)
- The Kick Horns – horns (tracks: 2, 9, 11)
- J. J. Nash – keyboards (tracks: 6, 7, 10, 12)
- Jonn Savannah – keyboards (tracks: 2, 3, 8)
- Flash – guitar, bass (track: 2)
- Victor Johnson – guitar, bass (track: 11)
- Sally Herbert – violin (track: 13)
- Audrey Riley, Chris Pitsillides, Leo Payne, Sally Fenton – strings (track: 3)
- Sian Bell, Sonia Slany – strings (track: 5)
- Chris Tombling, Jayne Harris, Leo Payne – strings (track: 7)

== Charts ==
Chart performance for Dare to Love
Chart (1995)	Peak position
German Albums Chart	79
Scottish Albums Chart	43
Swiss Albums Chart	45
UK Albums Chart	38
US Heatseekers Albums	36
