= Ramblin' Fever =

Studio album by Merle Haggard
- Released: May 1977
- Recorded: March 1977
- Genre: Country
- Length: 30:03
- Label: MCA
- Producer: Ken Nelson, Hank Cochran

Merle Haggard chronology
Songs I'll Always Sing (1977)	Ramblin' Fever (1977)	A Working Man Can't Get Nowhere Today (1977)

Singles from Ramblin' Fever
- 1. "If We're Not Back in Love by Monday" Released: March 21, 1977; 2. "Ramblin' Fever" Released: May 30, 1977

Ramblin' Fever is a studio album by American country music singer Merle Haggard, released in 1977. It was his first on the MCA label after recording for Capitol Records since 1965. It was also his first album without crediting the Strangers. It reached Number 5 on the Country album chart. Ramblin' Fever was reissued on CD in 2002.

== Background ==
Haggard had enjoyed an immensely successful artistic and commercial run with Capitol and producer Ken Nelson, accumulating twenty-four #1 country singles since 1966. According to music journalist Daniel Cooper's essay for the 1994 Haggard retrospective Down Every Road, there was no animosity or disillusionment with the Capitol brass, and the change was made simply because MCA had made a better offer. In his 2013 Haggard biography The Running Kind, David Cantwell notes that by the latter half of the 1970s the singer had placed forty-three singles on Billboard's country charts, had won the Country Music Association's top prize, "Entertainer of the Year," had been pardoned by California governor Ronald Reagan, had performed for President Richard Nixon, and had made the cover of Time magazine, and in response, "He ran. As the Seventies wound to an end, he was more restless than usual.... He even moved to Nashville for a while, and in 1978, divorced Bonnie Owens and married Leona Williams. Then, in 1979, he announced he was quitting music entirely." Haggard's tenure with MCA would be far shorter than his stay at Capitol; he would sign with Epic Records in 1981.

== Recording and composition ==
Haggard's final two Capitol albums, My Love Affair with Trains and The Roots of My Raising, contained only two Haggard-written songs, a far cry from his earlier albums when he would routinely compose most of the songs himself. Ramblin' Fever only features a couple Haggard originals: the southern rock-tinged title track, which rose to #2 on the country charts, and "I Think It's Gone Forever," a co-write with Leona Williams. "I wrote it at Leona Williams' house in the Seventies there one afternoon," Haggard remembers in the 1987 concert video Poet of the Common Man. "I don't recall what in the hell caused me to write it." His first single at MCA, "If We're Not Back In Love By Monday," had also peaked at #2. According to Daniel Cooper's Down Every Road liner notes, Haggard hated his vocal on the Sonny Throckmorton tune. In his 1999 memoir My House of Memories, Haggard wrote of the song: "That one rose to number two for two weeks in 1977, but its melody sounded too much like "If We Make It Through December", which was number one for four weeks in 1973."

== Critical reception ==
Professional ratings
Review scores
Source	Rating
AllMusic	3/5 stars
The Rolling Stone Album Guide	3/5 stars

In his 2013 Haggard biography The Running Kind, David Cantwell writes that while the "Ramblin' Fever" single showed promise, "there doesn't seem to have been much good stuff coming from Merle at this time, or much new stuff at all."

== Track listing ==
No.	Title	Writer(s)	Length
1.	"Ramblin' Fever"	Merle Haggard	3:11
2.	"When My Blue Moon Turns to Gold Again"	Wiley Walker, Gene Sullivan	3:18
3.	"Ghost Story"	Joe Allen	2:45
4.	"Set Me Free"	Curly Putman	2:41
5.	"Love Somebody to Death"	Red Lane, Glenn Martin	3:16
6.	"If We're Not Back in Love by Monday"	Martin, Sonny Throckmorton	3:16
7.	"I Think It's Gone Forever"	Haggard, Leona Williams	2:57
8.	"Ain't Your Memory Got No Pride at All"	Red Lane, Royce Porter, Bucky Jones	2:35
9.	"My Love for You"	Jeannie Seely	2:26
10.	"The Last Letter"	Rex Griffin	3:33

== Personnel ==
- Merle Haggard – vocals, guitar
- Grady Martin – guitar
- Dave Kirby – guitar
- Red Lane – guitar
- Bob Moore – bass
- Joe Allen – bass
- Buddy Harman – drums
- James Isbell – drums

== Charts ==
=== Weekly charts ===
Chart (1977)	Peak position
US Top Country Albums (Billboard)	5

=== Year-end charts ===
Chart (1977)	Position
US Top Country Albums (Billboard)	24
