= Dan Yessian =

American musician (born 1944)

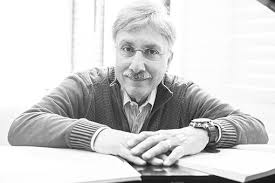
- Born: September 5, 1944 (age 81)

Dan Yessian (/jɛsiːɪn/,Yes-e-in) (born September 5, 1944) is an American producer, musician, composer, arranger, woodwind musician and keyboardist. In 1971, he founded Yessian Music Inc., a music and sound design production company. Yessian received a Distinguished Achievement Award at the 2016 Detroit Music Awards.

Yessian is of Armenian ancestry. The documentary and musical composition "An Armenian Trilogy" featured on PBS documents Yessian's journey exploring his ancestral Armenian roots and his work composing three musical movements, "The Freedom," "The Fear," and "The Faith". His work was performed live by the Armenian Philharmonic Orchestra in Yerevan, Armenia.

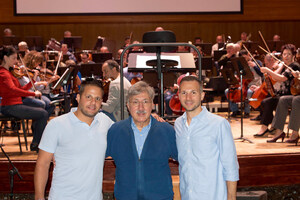
Michael, Dan and Brian Yessian in Armenia during the LIVE performance of original music featured in Dan Yessian's documentary, "An Armenian Trilogy".

== Career ==
Yessian graduated from Wayne State University in 1967. Yessian taught speech and English for four years at Detroit's Redford High School; he left his career in education to pursue a music career.

Yessian wrote numerous national and regional commercial jingles for companies such as Whirlpool, Dodge, Ford Motors Company, Coca-Cola, McDonald's, Chevrolet, and Little Caesar's. Yessian's jingle for Detroit-based business "Diitrich Furs" aired for over 40 years.

Yessian wrote music for "Sesame Street" with animator Ted Petok. His work on 1970s nationally syndicated children show "Hot Fudge" won a national award for children's programming. He worked for the Electric Company.

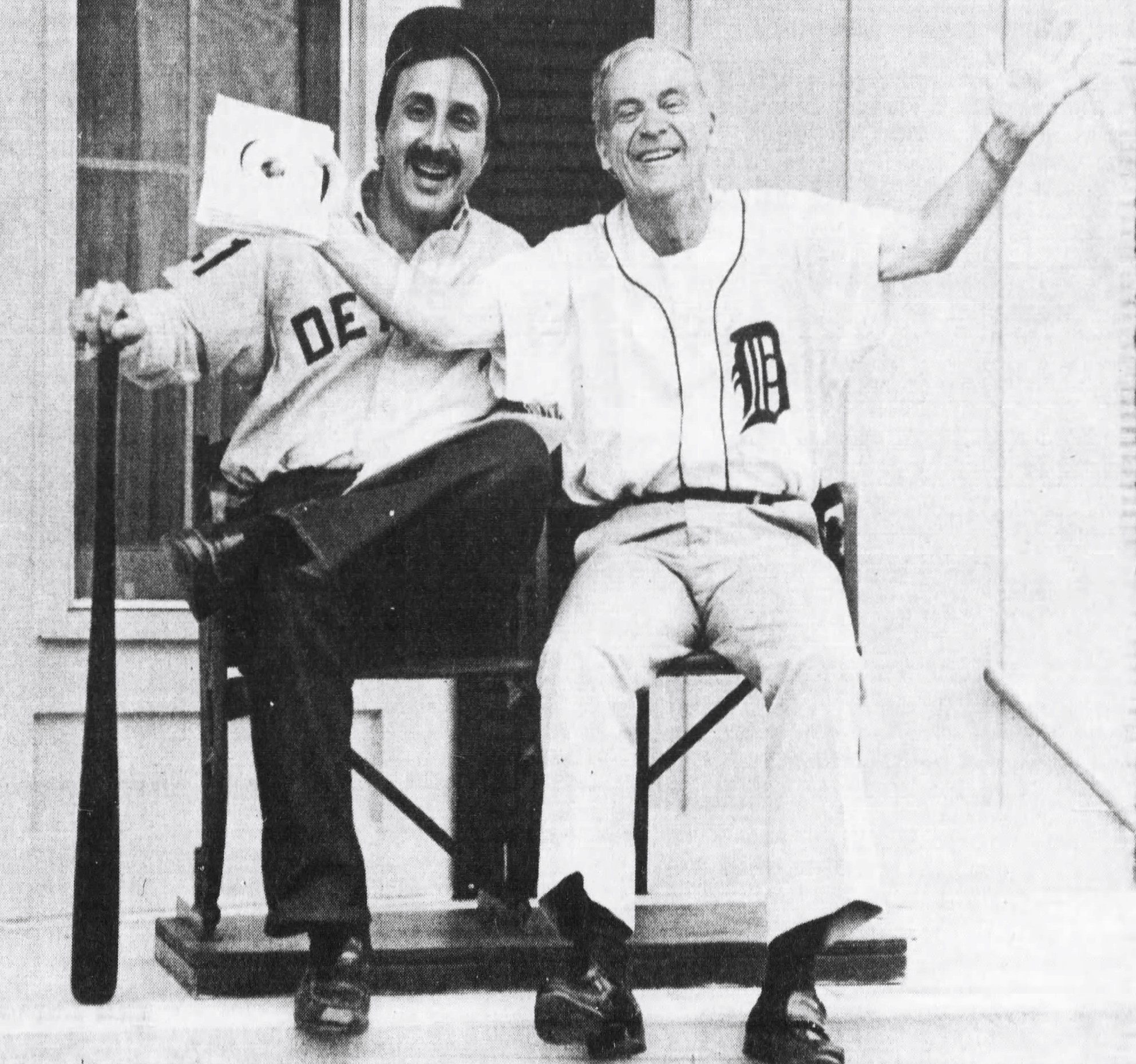
Musician Dan Yessian and Detroit Tigers broadcaster Ernie Harwell.

Yessian wrote theme songs for sports organizations including Detroit Pistons, Detroit Red Wings, Detroit Tigers and Los Angeles Dodgers.

Yessian co-wrote several songs with the late Ernie Harwell.

In the 1980s, Yessian met songwriter David Barrett (Composer "One Shining Moment") with whom he composed numerous songs, including a collaboration with Kenny Watson on "I See Wings," a song written for Yessian's documentary and symphonic work "An Armenian Trilogy". In 2006, Yessian purchased Burt Bacharach's piano, on which he wrote numerous music compositions including classical pieces featured in "An Armenian Trilogy".

=== Yessian Music ===
In 1971, Yessian founded Yessian Music Inc., in Farmington, Michigan. Yessian composed music for theme parks and museums; productions include The One World Observatory and Hudson Yards in New York, Trans Studio, Ferrari World, Lotte World, Chimelong, Movie Park.

Since the 1990s, Brian and Michael Yessian have led Yessian Music, an international music production company with locations in Michigan, New York City, Los Angeles, and Europe. The company produces music and sound designs, and employs over 150 full-time and freelance creative artists. Yessian's Music's work is featured video games, movies, television, sports entertainment and sound production for Disney, Cadillac, Little Caesar's Pizza, Mercedes Benz, Coca-Cola, United Airlines.

The company created music featured in five commercials aired in the 2012 Super Bowl. Yessian Music's work also includes sound production for "Sunday Night Football," "America's Got Talent," and "The Voice".

Yessian Music won numerous awards in the advertising and television industry. In 2018, Yessian was inducted into the Adcraft Hall of Fame in Detroit, receiving a lifetime achievement award for his work in the advertising industry.

=== An Armenian Trilogy ===
Yessian created "An Armenian Trilogy," a documentary and 22-minute symphonic music piece in honor of the Armenian Genocide of 1915, in which 1.5 million Armenians were slaughtered. Said Yessian,

"When my Armenian church priest Father Garabed Kochakian asked me to commemorate the 100th anniversary of the Armenian Genocide, it proved to be a life changing request [...] I discovered the path my ancestors had taken during this dark time and I began to tell their story through music, and ultimately film."

Yessian worked with arranger and pianist Kurt Schreitmueller, and the pair composed the first iteration of a duet for violin and piano. It debuted in 2015 at Macomb Center for Performing Arts, featuring musicians Sonia Lee and Shawn McDonald. Yessian expanded the musical suite to a full symphonic tribute with the help of orchestrator William Wandel and Stewart Shevin.

In 2017, Yessian worked with producer Ohad Wilner documenting his family trip to Armenia. The Armenian National Philharmonic performed Yessian's three-part original music at the Aram Khachaturian Concert Hall in Armenia's capital city of Yerevan.
