= Songs I'll Always Sing =

Compilation album by Merle Haggard and the Strangers
- Released: 1977
- Genre: Country
- Label: Capitol
- Producer: Ken Nelson, Fuzzy Owen

Merle Haggard and the Strangers chronology
| The Roots of My Raising (1976) | Songs I'll Always Sing (1977) | Ramblin' Fever (1977) |

Songs I'll Always Sing is a two-record compilation album by American country music singer and songwriter Merle Haggard, released in 1977. It reached No. 15 on the US Country Charts. The album collects many of Haggard's best known recordings during his successful run at Capitol Records, including nine of his twenty-four No. 1 hits, dating back to 1966.

== Critical reception ==
Professional ratings
Review scores
| Source | Rating |
|---|---|
| AllMusic | 5/5 stars |
| Christgau's Record Guide | A− |
| The Encyclopedia of Popular Music | 4/5 stars |
| The Rolling Stone Album Guide | 5/5 stars |

AllMusic critic Stephen Thomas Erlewine wrote in his review: "Though many compilations have followed it since it was first released in 1976, Songs I'll Always Sing remains one of the definitive Merle Haggard compilations. Relying not only on hit singles, the 20-track double-album set features a number of album tracks and obscurities - such as 'Love and Honor,' 'Silver Wings,' 'Honky Tonk Night Time Man,' 'Things Aren't Funny Anymore,' and 'I Forget You Every Day' - which give a more rounded and accurate picture of Hag's classic Capitol recordings."

In 2002, Rolling Stone listed Songs I'll Always Sing as the 42nd "coolest" album of all time. Salt Lake City Weekly deemed it "one of the single-best country records available."

== Track listing ==
All songs by Merle Haggard unless otherwise noted.

=== Side 1 ===
1. "Okie from Muskogee" (Merle Haggard, Eddie Burris) – 2:53 - 1969 #1
2. "The Emptiest Arms in the World" – 2:50 - 1973
3. "Mama Tried" – 2:10 - 1968 #1
4. "Swinging Doors" – 2:51 - 1966
5. "Uncle Lem" (Glenn Martin) – 2:54 - 1974

=== Side 2 ===
1. "The Fightin' Side of Me" – 2:48 - 1970 #1
2. "Sing Me Back Home" – 2:45 - 1968 #1
3. "Silver Wings" – 2:53 - 1968
4. "Sing a Sad Song" (Wynn Stewart) – 2:30 - 1963
5. "Honky Tonk Night Time Man" – 2:38 - 1974

=== Side 3 ===
1. "Kentucky Gambler" (Dolly Parton) – 2:39 - 1974 #1
2. "I'm a Lonesome Fugitive" (Liz Anderson, Casey Anderson) – 2:55 - 1967 #1
3. "Things Aren't Funny Anymore" – 2:40 - 1974 #1
4. "Daddy Frank (The Guitar Man)" – 3:10 - 1971 #1
5. "I Forget You Every Day" – 2:52 - 1973

=== Side 4 ===
1. "Workin' Man Blues" – 2:33 - 1969 #1
2. "Love and Honor" – 2:47 - 1974
3. "Branded Man" – 3:04 - 1967
4. "Someday We'll Look Back" – 2:28 - 1971
5. "I Take a Lot of Pride in What I Am" – 2:47 - 1968

== Personnel ==
- Merle Haggard – vocals, guitar

The Strangers:

- Roy Nichols – lead guitar
- Norman Hamlet – steel guitar
- Tiny Moore – mandolin, fiddle
- Eldon Shamblin– guitar
- Ralph Mooney – steel guitar
- Gene Price – bass
- Gordon Terry – fiddle
- Ronnie Reno – guitar
- Bobby Wayne – guitar
- Marcia Nichols – guitar
- Clint Strong – guitar
- Mark Yeary – piano
- George French – piano
- Dennis Hromek – bass
- James Tittle – bass
- Johnny Meeks – bass
- Jerry Ward – bass
- Wayne Durham – bass
- Biff Adam – drums
- Eddie Burris – drums
- Don Markham – saxophone
- Jimmy Belkin – fiddle
- Gary Church – horns

== Production ==
- Produced by Ken Nelson & Fuzzy Owen
