= Lanier & Co. =

American band

Lanier & Co. were an American R&B-soul-funk band formed in Jackson, Tennessee by brothers Farris Lanier Jr. (lead vocals), Marlon Lanier (alto saxophone) and Fenoye Lanier (drums), with Joseph McKinney (keyboards), Milton Price (bass), Mark Brown (trumpet), Sam Frazier (saxophone), and Lee Freeman (guitar). The band signed with the Larc Records in the early 1980s and released a couple of singles with moderate success. They saw their biggest chart success with the 1982 single "After I Cry Tonight", written by Phillip Mitchell. It reached No. 26 on the Billboard R&B chart and No. 48 on the Billboard Hot 100 chart. They had two more R&B singles, "I Just Got to Have You" (No. 47) and "Share Your Love with Me" (No. 57), both in 1983.

Their eponymous album Lanier & Co. was released in 1983 and included the previous singles. The band toured extensively in North America, Europe, South Africa, but never managed to chart again.

Farris Lanier Jr. (born January 23, 1949) died on November 21, 2019, at age 70.

== Members ==
- Farris Lanier Jr. (lead vocals; died 2019)
- Marlon Lanier (alto saxophone)
- Fenoye Lanier (drums)
- Joseph McKinney (keyboards)
- Milton Price (bass)
- Mark Brown (trumpet)
- Sam Frazier (saxophone)
- Lee Freeman (guitar)

== Discography ==
=== Albums ===
- Lanier & Co. (Larc Records, 1983)
- Dancing in the Night (Waylo Records, 1987)

=== Singles ===
- "After I Cry Tonight" / "Living for My Music" (1982) (R&B #26, Pop #48)
- "I Just Got to Have You" / "Come On Out, Let's Party" (1983) (R&B #47)
- "Share Your Love with Me" / "Fallin' in Love Again" (1983) (R&B #57)
