= Still Caught Up =

Studio album by Millie Jackson
- Released: 1975
- Recorded: Muscle Shoals Sound Studio, Sheffield, Alabama; Criteria Studios, Miami, Florida
- Genre: R&B
- Length: 31:40
- Label: Spring
- Producer: Brad Shapiro

Millie Jackson chronology
Caught Up (1974)	Still Caught Up (1975)	Free And In Love (1976)

Professional ratings
Review scores
Source	Rating
Allmusic	4/5 stars
Christgau's Record Guide	B+

Still Caught Up is the fifth album by R&B musician Millie Jackson, issued by Spring Records in 1975. It includes the single, "Loving Arms" / "Leftovers." A sequel to Jackson's previous album, Caught Up, which told the story of a woman having an affair with a married man, Still Caught Up reprises its themes of adultery and recrimination. Where Side A of Caught Up featured Jackson singing from the mistress' point of view and Side B from the jilted wife's point of view, Still Caught Up begins with the wife on Side A and concludes with the mistress on Side B.

== Track listing ==
1. "Loving Arms" (Tom Jans) – 3:43
2. "Making the Best of a Bad Situation" (Richard Kerr, Gary Osborne) – 3:00
3. "The Memory of a Wife" (Millie Jackson, King Sterling) - 5:12
4. "Tell Her It's Over" (Millie Jackson, King Sterling) – 4:06
5. "Do What Makes You Satisfied" (Millie Jackson, King Sterling) – 3:38
6. "You Can't Stand the Thought of Another Me" (Phillip Mitchell) – 2:51
7. "Leftovers" (Phillip Mitchell) – 4:31
8. "I Still Love You (You Still Love Me)" (Mac Davis, Mark James) – 4:39

== Charts ==
Chart (1975)	Peak position
Australia (Kent Music Report)	96

== Personnel ==
- Millie Jackson - vocals

=== Musicians ===
- Barry Beckett - Keyboards
- Pete Carr - Guitar
- Charles Chalmers - Vocals
- Sandra Chalmers - Vocals
- Janie Fricke - Vocals
- David Hood - Bass
- Roger Hawkins - Drums
- Jimmy Johnson - Guitar
- Sandy Rhodes - Vocals
- Donna Rhodes - Vocals
- Tom Roady - Percussion

=== Others ===
- Mac Emmerman - Engineer
- Mike Lewis - Arranger, Conductor
- Jerry Masters - Engineer
- Steve Melton - Engineer
- Brad Shapiro - Conductor, Producer, Rhythm Arrangements
- Adam Skeaping - Post Production
- The Swampers - Conductor, Rhythm Arrangements
- Ernie Winfrey - Engineer
- Nima Yakubu - Photography
