= Luminites =

English band

- Origin: London, England, UK
- Genre: Pop
- Years active: 2011–2014
- Label: Syco
- Past members: Jordan Clarke; Ben Francis; Corey Layzell; Stephanie Nala

Luminites were a four-piece English band from London who rose to fame after reaching the final of the seventh series of Britain's Got Talent in 2013.

== History ==
=== 2011–12: Beginnings ===
The band were founded in September 2011. They have uploaded videos of their covers on YouTube. They stated that fans' comments encouraged them to audition. They frequently busked on the streets of London. They also released a charity single in 2011. They revealed during their time on BGT that they had been bullied at school because people deemed their musical aspirations as uncool, but mentioned that they intend to be role models.

When interviewed by Shireen Fenner of Flavourmag they responded: JJ: "The guys who are managing us they spotted Ben and were blown away by his beat-boxing talent. They had a chat with Ben to see how they could channel his talent, and they had a few ideas. One of them, which they ended up going with, was Ben helping with finding a group of people to put together. I know Anthony (Anthony Andrews, one of their managers) because my school is right next to his office, and I heard him speaking to one of my friends about music, and it was something I wanted to get involved in. They found us all in different ways, I sang in front of Anthony in his office." Corey: "I put loads of stuff on YouTube, and the managers spotted me whilst flicking through there." Steph: "I went along to a rehearsal with my friend to show my support. Anthony asked me to sing and I was like no because I’ve never sung before, and it just went from there really."

=== 2012–13: Britain's Got Talent ===
They auditioned with "Hurts So Good" which was aired on 27 April 2013, and were put through to the next round, and the semi-finals. They performed "To Love Somebody" in the live semi-final on 30 May. They received 35.6% of the vote and won the semi-final, therefore were sent through to the final. They performed "Hurts So Good" again and finished in fifth place with 6.8% of the vote. They were described as Britain's answer to The Black Eyed Peas by judge Simon Cowell.

=== 2013–14: Post BGT and split ===
They announced on 17 June that they were to embark on a three-day tour, visiting London, Manchester and Birmingham from 24–26 July 2013. On 17 November 2013 they released their debut single "Do Something", which reached number 65 on the UK Singles Chart.

On 9 April 2014, Luminites announced on Twitter and Facebook that they were splitting up after three years together in order for them all to pursue different things. Nala successfully made it to the live shows of the eleventh series of The X Factor and finished in 14th place.

== Members ==
- Jordan Clarke (born 29 September 1994) – from Margaretting, Essex
- Stephanie Nala (born 23 April 1994) – from Cheshunt, Hertfordshire
- Ben Francis (born 5 April 1993) – from Romford, Essex
- Corey Layzell (born 24 February 1991) – from London
