= Ramblin' Fever (song) =

Single by Merle Haggard

from the album Ramblin' Fever
- B-side: "When My Blue Moon Turns to Gold Again"
- Released: May 30, 1977
- Genre: Country
- Length: 3:14
- Label: MCA
- Songwriter(s): Merle Haggard
- Producer(s): Hank Cochran

Merle Haggard singles chronology
"If We're Not Back in Love by Monday" (1977)	"Ramblin' Fever" (1977)	"A Working Man Can't Get Nowhere Today" (1977)

"Ramblin' Fever" is a song written and recorded by American country music artist Merle Haggard. It was released in May 1977 as the second single and title track from the album Ramblin' Fever. The song spent two weeks at number two on the Billboard Hot Country Singles & Tracks chart.

== Charts ==
=== Weekly charts ===
Chart (1977)	Peak position
US Hot Country Songs (Billboard)	2
Canadian RPM Country Tracks	3

=== Year-end charts ===
Chart (1977)	Position
US Hot Country Songs (Billboard)	37
