= E.S.P. (Extra Sexual Persuasion) =

Studio album by Millie Jackson
- Released: 1983
- Recorded: 1982–1983
- Studio: Muscle Shoals Sound Studios
- Genre: R&B, Dance
- Label: Sire/Warner Bros. Records
- Producer: Brad Shapiro, Millie Jackson

Millie Jackson chronology
Millie Jackson: "Live and Outrageous" (Rated XXX) (1982)	E.S.P. (Extra Sexual Persuasion) (1983)	An Imitation of Love (1986)

E.S.P. (Extra Sexual Persuasion) is a Millie Jackson album released in 1983. In addition to her signature soul music songs, it also includes somewhat more Hi-NRG and Funk dance song production popular at the time such as "This Girl Could Be Dangerous", "Sexercise" and the title track.

== Critical reception ==
In a contemporary review for The Village Voice, music critic Robert Christgau gave the album a "B−" and wrote that, despite her mannerisms and persuasive parodies of sexercise, Jackson lacks the redeeming slow songs of her past work, and both "Slow Tongue" and the title track sound contrived.

== Track listing ==
1. "E.S.P." (Deborah Allen, Steve Diamond, Rafe Van Hoy) – 3:58
2. "Too Easy Being Easy" (Barry Beckett, Millie Jackson, Brad Shapiro) – 7:00
3. "This Girl Could Be Dangerous" (Wood Newton, Michael Noble) – 3:01
4. I Feel Like Walkin' In The Rain" (A.C. Graham, Wayne Perkins) – 3:58
5. "Sexercise (Pt.1)" (Bruce Fischel, Vicky Germaise, Millie Jackson, Randy Klein) – 3:00
6. "Sexercise (Pt. 2)" (Bruce Fischel, Vicky Germaise, Millie Jackson, Randy Klein) – 2:41
7. "You're Working Me" (David B. Lindsey) – 4:07
8. "Slow Tongue" (Bruce Fischel, Vicky Germaise, Randy Klein) – 4:58
9. "Why Me" (Millie Jackson, Wayne Perkins, Brad Shapiro) – 3:24

== Personnel ==
- Pete Green – assistant engineer, mixing
- David Hood – bass
- Millie Jackson – vocals, producer
- Jimmy Johnson – engineer
- Carl Marsh – keyboards
- Steve Nathan – keyboards
- Wayne Perkins – guitar
- Donna McElroy, Michael Mishaw, Vicky Hampton - background vocals
- Ben Cauley, Charles Rose, Harrison Callaway Jr., Harvey Thompson - horns
- Chris Popham – design
- Brad Shapiro – producer
- Regor Snikwah (actually Roger Hawkins) - drum programming
- Chuck Stewart – photography
