= The Roots of My Raising (song) =

Single by Merle Haggard and The Strangers

from the album The Roots of My Raising
- B-side: "The Way It Was In '51"
- Released: January 12, 1976
- Recorded: 1975
- Genre: Country
- Length: 2:45
- Label: Capitol
- Songwriter(s): Tommy Collins
- Producer(s): Ken Nelson and Fuzzy Owen

Merle Haggard and The Strangers singles chronology
"It's All in the Movies" (1975)	"The Roots of My Raising" (1976)	"Here Comes the Freedom Train" (1976)

"The Roots of My Raising" is a song written by Tommy Collins and released by him in 1970. It was famously covered by American country music artist Merle Haggard and The Strangers in January 1976 as the first single and title track from the album The Roots of My Raising. The song was Merle Haggard and The Strangers twenty-third number one on the country chart. The single spent one week at number one and a total of ten weeks on the country chart.

== Content ==
The song, sung in first-person, sees a young man who visits his childhood home for the first time in several years. As he approaches home, he reflects on the gravel road and the one-room schoolhouse he attended as a child. Once at home, he sees his father sleeping, comfortably and clutching a photo of his wife (the singer's mother) in his hands. At this point, he speaks of his now-deceased mother and recalls times where people could take out a bank loan simply on a verbal promise of repayment.

== B-side: "The Way it was in '51" ==
The flip side of "The Roots of My Raising" was "The Way It Was in '51," which enjoyed minor chart success in 1978, reaching No. 82 on the Billboard Hot Country Singles chart, and gets airplay on classic country stations today.

The song also takes a nostalgic look back at, in the singer's view, a simpler time and one of friends and companionship. Here, a 40-year-old man takes a look back at the year 1951 – some 25 years earlier, at the time of its release – a time he fondly remembers well: just a few years before rock and roll music and four-lane highways, drive-in restaurants populated the countryside, servicemen were proud of what they'd done, and when "Hank and Lefty crowded every jukebox."

== Personnel ==
- Merle Haggard– vocals, guitar

The Strangers:

- Roy Nichols – lead guitar
- Norman Hamlet – steel guitar, dobro
- Tiny Moore – mandolin
- Eldon Shamblin– guitar
- Ronnie Reno – guitar
- Mark Yeary – piano
- James Tittle – bass
- Biff Adam – drums
- Don Markham – saxophone

== Charts ==
=== Weekly charts ===
Chart (1976)	Peak position
US Hot Country Songs (Billboard)	1
Canadian RPM Country Tracks	7

=== Year-end charts ===
Chart (1976)	Position
US Hot Country Songs (Billboard)	39
