= Phillip Mitchell =

Singer and songwriter

- Also known as: Prince Phillip Mitchell
- Born: Leroy Phillip Mitchell; 27 June 1944 (age 82); Louisville, Kentucky, United States
- Genres: R&B, funk
- Occupations: Singer, songwriter, record producer
- Instruments: Vocals, piano, guitar
- Years active: 1961–present
- Labels: Muscle Shoals Sound, Shout, Hi, Event, Atlantic, Ichiban, 3rd Dynasty

Leroy Phillip Mitchell (born June 27, 1944), often credited as Prince Phillip Mitchell, is an American R&B singer, songwriter, and record producer. He wrote "Starting All Over Again" for Mel and Tim, and "It Hurts So Good" and "Leftovers", which were both hits for Millie Jackson, as well as having some success in the 1970s and 1980s as a solo singer.

== Life and career ==
Mitchell was born in Louisville, Kentucky, and began singing when at school. After first learning trumpet, he taught himself to play guitar and piano, and started writing songs at an early age. He became lead singer in a local group, the Checkmates, who first recorded in 1961, before he left to join another group, the Cash Registers, who had previously been led by Alvin Cash. They performed in Indianapolis, where Mitchell acquired the nickname "Prince" Phillip, but he was then drafted into the military. He was soon discharged on medical grounds, and became the lead singer for another Indianapolis group, the Moonlighters, before joining a musical revue touring the southern States. On reaching Muscle Shoals, Mitchell left the revue and signed as a performer with Rick Hall's Fame record label. However, his recordings were not released at the time, and he then recorded unsuccessfully with producer Huey Meaux in Houston, Texas. Next, he moved to Los Angeles, where he became a member of vocal and dance group the Bean Brothers, so named for their height – Mitchell is 6 ft 6 in (1.98 m) tall.

In 1969 he returned to Muscle Shoals, where he signed a contract as a songwriter with the Muscle Shoals Sound label run by Roger Hawkins and Barry Beckett of the Muscle Shoals Rhythm Section. While there, he wrote "It Hurts So Good", first recorded by Katie Love in 1971 and later a hit for both Millie Jackson and (as "Hurt So Good") Susan Cadogan. Mitchell recorded for the Shout label, including the single "Free For All", and began writing songs for Stax Records. His most successful was "Starting All Over Again", originally written for Sam and Dave but recorded instead by Mel and Tim, whose version was a Billboard chart hit in 1972.

Mitchell signed with Hi Records in 1971, recording several further singles, some of which were produced by the unrelated Willie Mitchell and others by Phillip Mitchell himself. Phillip Mitchell also worked as a producer with Archie Bell and the Drells, and Curtis Wiggins, as well as continuing to write songs for Millie Jackson, including several on her breakthrough albums Caught Up (1974) and Still Caught Up (1975). Jackson's producer, Brad Shapiro, also produced Mitchell's single "There's Another in My Life", which became his first hit as a performer when released on the Event label, a subsidiary of Spring Records. The single reached no.58 on the R&B chart in 1975. Mitchell also wrote "A Star in the Ghetto", recorded by the Average White Band with Ben E. King, and wrote songs recorded by Bobby Womack, Joe Simon and Candi Staton.

By 1977 Mitchell was back performing in Louisville, when he was contacted by jazz musician Norman Connors; Mitchell wrote and sang on Connors' hit "Once I've Been There", and toured with Connors. As a result, Mitchell was signed by Atlantic Records and had several chart singles with the label, the most successful being "One On One" which reached no.32 on the R&B chart in 1978. Credited as Prince Phillip Mitchell, he also released two self-produced albums on Atlantic, Make It Good (1978) which was recorded in California, and Top of the Line (1979), recorded at Muscle Shoals. Both albums featured his own songs.

"After I Cry Tonight", written by Mitchell, was recorded and released by the soul-funk band Lanier & Co. In 1982, the single reached No. 26 on the R&B chart and No. 48 on the Billboard Hot 100 chart.

After his Atlantic contract expired, Mitchell then left the music business for several years, before returning on the Ichiban label in 1986 with the album Devastation, which produced the minor R&B chart hit "You're Gonna Come Back To Love". However, a follow-up album, Loner, was not issued until 1991. He later performed on tour in the UK and Europe, and established his own recording company, 3rd Dynasty Records, in Louisville.

A compilation album of some of his recordings and songs recorded by other performers, Something New To Do: The Phillip Mitchell Songbook, was issued by Ace Records in 2004.
