= Caught Up (Millie Jackson album) =

Studio album by Millie Jackson
- Released: 1974
- Recorded: 1973–1974
- Studios: Muscle Shoals Sound Studio, Sheffield, Alabama; Criteria Studios, Miami, Florida
- Genre: Deep soul
- Length: 35:59
- Label: Spring
- Producer: Brad Shapiro

Millie Jackson chronology
I Got To Try It One Time (1974)	Caught Up (1974)	Still Caught Up (1975)

Professional ratings
Review scores
Source	Rating
AllMusic	4.5/5 stars
Christgau's Record Guide	A−

Caught Up is the fourth album by R&B musician Millie Jackson. It includes the hit singles "(If Loving You Is Wrong) I Don't Want to Be Right", "The Rap" and "I'm Through Trying to Prove My Love to You." A concept album, Caught Up follows the story of a woman having an affair with a married man. Side A features Jackson singing from the mistress' point of view and Side B is told from the wife's point of view.

The album was ranked 23 of the best albums of 1974 by Rolling Stone.

== Track listing ==
Side A

1. "(If Loving You Is Wrong) I Don't Want to Be Right" (Homer Banks, Carl Hampton, Raymond Jackson) – 3:56
2. "The Rap" (Millie Jackson) – 5:53
3. "(If Loving You Is Wrong) I Don't Want to Be Right (Reprise)" (Homer Banks, Carl Hampton, Raymond Jackson) - 1:13
4. "All I Want is a Fighting Chance" (Millie Jackson, King Sterling) – 2:37
5. "I'm Tired of Hiding" (Phillip Mitchell, Billy Clements) – 3:51

Side B

1. "It's All Over but the Shouting" (Millie Jackson, King Sterling) – 2:51
2. "So Easy Going, So Hard Coming Back" (Phillip Mitchell) – 4:07
3. "I'm Through Trying to Prove My Love to You" (Bobby Womack) – 5:48
4. "Summer (The First Time)" (Bobby Goldsboro) – 5:43

== Personnel ==
- Millie Jackson - vocals, concept
- Barry Beckett - keyboards
- David Hood - bass
- Roger Hawkins - drums
- Jimmy Johnson - guitar
- Mike Lewis - orchestration
- Tom Roady, Brad Shapiro - percussion

Technical

- David Wiseltier - cover design

== Certifications ==
Region	Certification	Certified units/sales
United States (RIAA)	Gold	500,000^{^}
^{^} Shipments figures based on certification alone.
