= Cherokee Maiden =

Song written by Cindy Walker

Single by Bob Wills and His Texas Playboys
- B-side: "Ride On (My Prairie Pinto)"
- Released: January 1942
- Recorded: July 23 & 24, 1941
- Studio: CBS Columbia Square Studio, Hollywood, California
- Genre: Western swing
- Label: Okeh 06568
- Songwriter(s): Cindy Walker

Bob Wills and His Texas Playboys singles chronology
| "Corrine Corrina" (1941) | "Cherokee Maiden" (1942) | "Dusty Skies" (1942) |

"Cherokee Maiden" is a Western swing love song written by Cindy Walker. "Cherokee Maiden" was one of Walker's first hits when it was recorded by Bob Wills and The Texas Playboys in 1941 (OKeh 6568).

== Background ==
The title comes from a refrain in the chorus:

My little Cherokee Maiden, I love her so.
And though we're far apart,
I know I'll never be tradin' my love for her,
For anybody else's heart.

== Merle Haggard cover ==
"Cherokee Maiden"

Single by Merle Haggard and The Strangers

from the album The Roots of My Raising
- B-side: "What Have You Got Planned Tonight Diana"
- Released: September 6, 1976
- Genre: Country
- Length: 3:00
- Label: Capitol
- Songwriter(s): Cindy Walker
- Producer(s): Ken Nelson, Fuzzy Owen

Merle Haggard and The Strangers singles chronology
| "Here Comes the Freedom Train" (1976) | "Cherokee Maiden" (1976) | "If We're Not Back in Love by Monday" (1977) |

Merle Haggard and The Strangers recorded "Cherokee Maiden" in 1976 (Capitol 4326). It spent 11 weeks on the charts, reaching number one.

=== Personnel ===
- Merle Haggard– vocals, guitar

The Strangers:

- Roy Nichols – lead guitar
- Norman Hamlet – steel guitar, dobro
- Tiny Moore – mandolin
- Eldon Shamblin– guitar
- Ronnie Reno – guitar
- Mark Yeary – piano
- James Tittle – bass
- Biff Adam – drums
- Don Markham – saxophone

=== Chart history ===
| Chart (1976) | Peak position |
|---|---|
| US Hot Country Songs (Billboard) | 1 |
| Canadian RPM Country Tracks | 1 |

== Other Cover Versions ==
- In 2001, a recording by Asleep At The Wheel earned the group a Grammy.
- In 1984, George Strait recorded a version of the song for the Silver Eagle radio show at the Lone Star Cafe In New York

== Bibliography ==
- Whitburn, Joel. The Billboard Book of Top 40 Country Hits. Billboard Books, 2006. ISBN 0-8230-8291-1
