= Millie Jackson (album) =

Studio album by Millie Jackson
- Released: 1972
- Studios: Mediasound, New York City; Track Recorders, Silver Spring, Maryland
- Genre: R&B
- Length: 29:05
- Label: Spring Records
- Producer: Raeford Gerald

Millie Jackson chronology
Millie Jackson (1972)	It Hurts So Good (1973)

Professional ratings
Review scores
Source	Rating
Allmusic	4.5/5 stars
Christgau's Record Guide	B+
Hi-Fi News & Record Review	A:1/2

Millie Jackson is the self-titled debut album by singer-songwriter Millie Jackson. This album is different from all her other albums to follow in that this album features some Motown style songs. It includes the R&B hits "A Child of God (It's Hard to Believe)", "My Man, A Sweet Man," and "Ask Me What You Want." The album was arranged by Tony Camillo and Bert de Coteaux.

In 2006, Ace Records in the UK digitally remastered this album (along with four other best-selling Millie Jackson albums) and released it on CD with bonus tracks and extensive liner notes.

== Track listings ==
All tracks composed by Raeford Gerald, except where indicated

1. "If This Is Love"
2. "I Ain't Giving Up" (Raeford Gerald, Joe Simon, Dock Price Jr.)
3. "I Miss You Baby"
4. "A Child of God (It's Hard to Believe)" (Millie Jackson, Don French)
5. "Ask Me What You Want" (Millie Jackson, Billy Nichols)
6. "My Man, a Sweet Man"
7. "You're The Joy of My Life" (Raeford Gerald, Reginald Spruill)
8. "I Gotta Get Away (From My Own Self)" (Raeford Gerald, Dock Price Jr.)
9. "I Just Can't Stand It" (Millie Jackson, Billy Nichols)
10. "Strange Things"

=== 2006 bonus tracks ===
11. "A Little Bit of Something" (Billy Nichols)
12. "My Heart Took a Licking (But It Kept on Ticking)" (Trudy Berry, Victor Davis)
13. "Untrue Men" (Trudy Berry, Pat McQueen, Eugene Hamilton, Rob Reeco)
14. "I Don't Wanna Talk About It"
15. "Ask Me What You Want" (Unedited Master)
16. "You're the Joy of My Life" (Alternate Take)
17. "My Man, a Sweet Man" (Unedited Master)
18. "I Just Can't Stand It" (Unedited Master)
19. "I Miss You Baby" (Alternate Mix with Additional Strings)
20. "Strange Things" (Alternate Mix with Additional Strings)
21. "Hypocrisy" (Alternate Version)

== Charts ==
Chart (1972)	Peak position
Billboard Top Soul Albums	166

=== Singles ===
Year	Single	Chart positions	
Year	Single	US Pop	US Soul
1971	"A Child of God (It's Hard to Believe)"	–	22
1972	"My Man, A Sweet Man"	42	7
1972	"Ask Me What You Want"	27	4
1973	"I Miss You Baby"	95	22
