= Larry Santos (album) =

Studio album by Larry Santos
- Released: 1975
- Recorded: 1975
- Genre: Pop, Adult Contemporary, Easy listening, singer-songwriter
- Label: Casablanca
- Producer: Don Davis

Larry Santos chronology
Legacy (1973)	Larry Santos (1975)	You Are Everything I Need (1976)

Singles from Larry Santos
- 1. "We Can't Hide It Anymore" Released: December 1975

Larry Santos is the fourth studio album by American pop singer and songwriter, Larry Santos, released on Casablanca Records in 1975. The album includes the song "We Can't Hide it Anymore" which reached number 36 on the Billboard Hot 100 pop song chart. it also features the Christian pop single, which is mainly all about Father God touching a newborn child and inspiring him with Christian love on an early sunrise, called, "Early In The Morning".

== Track listing ==
1. "Early in the Morning"
2. "Call Me Janis"
3. "We Can't Hide it Anymore"
4. "Can't Get You Off My Mind"
5. "Meet Me Tonight"
6. "Jon Jon McAllister"
7. "Wanting What You Can't Have (Having What You Don't Want)"
8. "Long, Long Time"
9. "Devil-Eyed Woman"
10. "Lover"

== Notes ==
Track 1 is originally "Early in the Mornin'"

== Personnel ==
- Richard Allen, Roger Hawkins – Drums
- Carl Austin, John Trudell – String & Horn Arrangements
- Barry Beckett, Rudy Robinson, Larry Santos, Earl Van Dyke – Keyboards
- Roderick Chandler, David Hood – Bass
- Don Davis – Arranger
- Bobby Eaton – Background Vocal Arrangement
- Eli Fountain – Saxophone on "Lover"
- Eddie Hinton, Jimmy Johnson, Robert White, Eddie Willis – Guitar
- Wade Marcus – Arranger
- Jeff Steinberg – Arranger
- David Van DePitte – Arranger
- Honey – Background Vocals

== Charts ==
Year	Single	Chart	Position
1975	"We Can't Hide It Anymore"	Billboard Hot 100	36
