= Hot! Wild! Unrestricted! Crazy Love =

Single by Millie Jackson

from the album An Imitation of Love & Back to the Shit
- Released: 1986
- Genre: Electronic, Funk/Soul
- Length: 5:58 (album version); 4:22 (1989 version)
- Label: Jive Records
- Songwriter(s): Millie Jackson, Timmy Allen
- Producer(s): Timmy Allen

"Hot! Wild! Unrestricted! Crazy Love" is a 1986 song by American singer Millie Jackson. It was one of three tracks to have appeared on her 1986 album An Imitation of Love and on her 1989 album Back to the Shit.

It made #99 on the UK Singles Chart and achieved a #9 peak on the US Hot Black Singles chart.
