= Here Comes the Freedom Train =

Single by Merle Haggard and The Strangers

from the album My Love Affair with Trains
- B-side: "I Won't Give Up My Train"
- Released: May 17, 1976
- Genre: Country
- Label: Capitol
- Songwriter(s): Stephen H. Lemberg
- Producer(s): Ken Nelson

Merle Haggard and The Strangers singles chronology
"The Roots of My Raising" (1975)	"Here Comes the Freedom Train" (1976)	"Cherokee Maiden" (1976)

"Here Comes the Freedom Train" is a song written by Stephen H. Lemberg, and recorded by American country music artist Merle Haggard and The Strangers. It was released in May 1976 as the first single from the album My Love Affair with Trains. "Here Comes the Freedom Train" peaked at number ten on the U.S. Billboard Hot Country Singles chart. It reached number-one on the Canadian RPM Country Tracks in July 1976.

It was originally written for the country music duo of Porter Wagoner and Dolly Parton, who recorded it with special guest Chet Atkins in RCA Studios for release in 1973 by the American Freedom Train Foundation. The 45 single of the recording was sold as a fund-raising item for the bicentennial trip Freedom Train took across the United States.

== Content ==
The song is historical narrative of the United States, which was about to celebrate its Bicentennial.

== Personnel ==
- Merle Haggard– vocals, guitar

The Strangers:

- Roy Nichols – lead guitar
- Norman Hamlet – steel guitar, dobro
- Tiny Moore – mandolin
- Eldon Shamblin– guitar
- Ronnie Reno – guitar
- Mark Yeary – piano
- James Tittle – bass
- Biff Adam – drums
- Don Markham – saxophone

== Chart performance ==
Chart (1976)	Peak position
US Hot Country Songs (Billboard)	10
Canadian RPM Country Tracks	1

== See also ==
- List of train songs
