= Live & Uncensored =

Live album by Millie Jackson
- Released: 1979
- Venue: The Roxy, Los Angeles, California
- Genre: Soul, R&B
- Length: 71:20
- Label: Spring Records; Polydor Records
- Producer: Millie Jackson, Brad Shapiro

Millie Jackson chronology
Royal Rappin's (1979)	Live & Uncensored (1979)	For Men Only (1980)

Professional ratings
Review scores
Source	Rating
Allmusic	4/5 stars
Christgau's Record Guide	A−

Live & Uncensored is a live album by Millie Jackson recorded in concert at The Roxy Theatre in Los Angeles, California. The album shows what her shows were like, from tender romantic ballads to explicit recreations of classical pieces. The dialogue during and between songs were often considered a highlight, with topics ranging from soap operas on television to shady men in her life. While not on stage with her, she singles out The Pointer Sisters in the crowd, casually talking with them as if they were all at a party. "Phuck U Symphony" is one of the best-known tracks on this album, and Jackson continues to include it in her live shows to this day.

The compact disc version features Jackson's 1982 live album, Live And Outrageous (Rated XXX), as a bonus.

== Track listing ==
Side A

1. "Keep The Home Fire Burnin'" (Benny Latimore, Steve Alaimo) - (3:28)
2. "Logs and Thangs" (Benny Latimore, Millie Jackson) - (5:15)
3. "(If You Want My Love) Put Something Down On It" (Bobby Womack) - (3:17)
4. "Da Ya Think I'm Sexy?" (Carmine Appice, Rod Stewart) - (1:02)
5. "Put Something Down On It (Reprise)" (0:58)
6. "Just When I Needed You Most" (Randy Vanwarmer) - (4:27)
7. "Phuck U Symphony" (Millie Jackson, Randy Klein) - (5:27)

Side B

1. "What Am I Waiting For" (Bunny Sigler, Ron Tyson) - (4:46)
2. "I Still Love You (You Still Love Me)" (Mac Davis, Mark James) - (6:23)
3. "All The Way Lover" (Benny Latimer) - (3:11)
4. "The Soaps" (Millie Jackson) - (9:06)
5. "All The Way Lover (Reprise)" (1:02)

Side C

1. "Hold The Line" (David Paich) - (3:59)
2. "Be a Sweetheart" (Brad Shapiro, Millie Jackson) - (2:53)
3. "Didn't I Blow Your Mind" (Thom Bell, William Hart) - (4:03)
4. "Give It Up" (Brad Shapiro, Millie Jackson) - (6:20)
5. "A Moment's Pleasure" (George Jackson) - (5:19)

Side D

1. "(If Loving You Is Wrong) I Don't Want To Be Right" (Carl Hampton, Homer Banks, Raymond Jackson) - (3:35)
2. "The Rap" (5:24)
3. "If Loving You Is Wrong (I Don't Want To Be Right) (Reprise)" (0:37)
4. "Never Change Lovers in the Middle of The Night" (Fred Jay, Keith Forsey, Mats Björklund) - (3:40)
5. "Sweet Music Man" (Kenny Rogers) - (9:39)
6. "It Hurts So Good" (Phillip Mitchell) - (0:51)
7. "Sweet Music Man (Reprise)" (1:12)

== Personnel ==
- Millie Jackson - vocals
- The Easy-Ak-Shun Band
- Muscle Shoals Horns
- The East Coast Horns
- Brandye, Lonnie Youngblood, Ray, Goodman & Brown - backing vocals

== Charts ==
Chart (1980)	Peak position
Billboard Pop Albums	94
Billboard Top Soul Albums	22

== Samples & Covers ==
- Black Sheep sampled "Phuck U Symphony" on their song "For Doz That Slept" on their album A Wolf in Sheep's Clothing in 1991.
