= Get It Out'cha System =

Studio album by Millie Jackson
- Released: 1978
- Genres: Soul, disco
- Length: 37:30
- Label: Spring
- Producers: Brad Shapiro, Millie Jackson

Millie Jackson chronology
Feelin' Bitchy (1977)	Get It Out'cha System (1978)	A Moment's Pleasure (1979)

Professional ratings
Review scores
Source	Rating
AllMusic	3/5 stars
Christgau's Record Guide	B+
The Encyclopedia of Popular Music	3/5 stars
The New Rolling Stone Album Guide	3/5 stars

Get It Out'cha System is a 1978 album by singer-songwriter Millie Jackson. David Van DePitte was responsible for the string and horn arrangements.

It peaked at No. 55 on the Billboard 200. It has sold more than 500,000 copies.

== Track listings ==
1. "Go Out and Get Some (Get It Out 'Cha System)" – (Millie Jackson, Randy Klein) 2:47
2. "Keep the Home Fire Burnin'" – (Benny Latimore, Steve Alaimo) 3:09
3. "Logs and Thangs" – (Benny Latimore, Millie Jackson) 5:46
4. "Put Something Down on It" – (Bobby Womack, Cecil Womack) 5:31
5. "Here You Come Again" – (Barry Mann, Cynthia Weil) 3:10
6. "Why Say You're Sorry" – (Brad Shapiro, Millie Jackson) 3:42
7. "He Wants to Hear the Words" – (Kathy Wakefield, Ken Hirsch) 3:14
8. "I Just Wanna Be with You" – (Brad Shapiro, Millie Jackson) 3:57
9. "Sweet Music Man" – (Kenny Rogers) 6:14

== Charts ==
Chart (1978)	Peak position
Billboard Top Soul Albums	14

=== Singles ===
Year	Single	Chart positions	
Year	Single	US Pop	US Soul
1978	"Sweet Music Man"	–	33
1979	"Keep the Home Fire Burnin'"	–	83

== Certifications ==
Region	Certification	Certified units/sales
United States (RIAA)	Gold	500,000^{^}
^{^} Shipments figures based on certification alone.
