= Heartbeat (Jimmy Somerville song) =

1995 single by Jimmy Somerville

Single by Jimmy Somerville

from the album Dare to Love
- B-side: "Up and Away"
- Released: 16 January 1995
- Genre: Hi-NRG; disco
- Length: 4:26
- Label: London
- Songwriters: Richard Stannard; Matt Rowe; Jimmy Somerville
- Producers: Stephen Hague; Gianfranco Bortolotti

Jimmy Somerville singles chronology
| "Smalltown Boy '94" (1994) | "Heartbeat" (1995) | "Hurt So Good" (1995) |

Music video
- "Heartbeat" on YouTube

"Heartbeat" is a song by Scottish pop singer-songwriter Jimmy Somerville, formerly the lead vocalist of the bands Bronski Beat and Communards. It was co-written by him with Richard Stannard and Matt Rowe, and produced by Stephen Hague and Gianfranco Bortolotti. The song features backing vocals by American dance music singers Shawn Christopher and Yvonne Gage. Released in January 1995 by London Records as the first single from Somerville's second solo album, Dare to Love (1995), it peaked at number 24 on the UK Singles Chart in February of that year and reached number in his native Scotland. The song received mixes from remixers like Armand van Helden and E-Smoove, and also topped the US Billboard Hot Dance Club Play for one week in April 1995, becoming Somerville's first and only solo number one on that chart. The accompanying music video for "Heartbeat" was filmed in black-and-white.

== Critical reception ==
In his weekly UK chart commentary, James Masterton said, "This new single marks his re-emergence from a musical lay-off with an inoffensive piece of Hi-NRG pop but not a record that is destined to make major waves on the chart." Pan-European magazine Music & Media named it a "pop houser", adding, "All these big comebacks are too bad for newcomers. Jimmy may queue up in the traffic jam back to the top slot along with Simple Minds ('She's a River') and Human League ('Tell Me When'). Doubtlessly one of his best efforts ever." Sylvia Patterson from NME described it as "thigh-blistering". Mark Sutherland from Smash Hits was negative and gave it one out of five, naming it a "dreary disco drivel".

== Track listing ==
- CD single, CD1 (UK, 1995)
1. "Heartbeat" (Radio Edit) — 4:27
2. "Heartbeat" (E-Smoove 12" Mix) — 10:37
3. "Heartbeat" (X-citing Mix) — 8:30
4. "Heartbeat" (Plus Staples 12" Mix) — 5:29
- CD single, CD2 (UK, 1995)
1. "Heartbeat" (Radio Edit) — 4:26
2. "Up and Away" — 3:14
3. "Heartbeat" (Armand's Cardiac Mix) — 8:09
4. "Heartbeat" (Heartbeat II Mix) — 6:3
- CD maxi-single (Europe, 1995)
1. "Heartbeat" (Radio Edit) — 4:26
2. "Heartbeat" (E-Smoove 12" Mix) — 10:37
3. "Heartbeat" (X-citing Mix) — 8:30

== Charts ==
| Chart (1995) | Peak position |
|---|---|
| Belgium (VRT Top 30 Flanders) | 26 |
| Belgium (Ultratop 50 Flanders) | 39 |
| Europe (Eurochart Hot 100) | 71 |
| Europe (European Hit Radio) | 8 |
| Finland (Suomen virallinen lista) | 18 |
| Germany (Media Control Charts) | 54 |
| Israel (Israeli Singles Chart) | 4 |
| Italy (Musica e dischi) | 21 |
| Italy Airplay (Music & Media) | 3 |
| Scotland (OCC) | 15 |
| UK Singles (OCC) | 24 |
| UK Dance Singles (OCC) | 8 |
| UK Club Chart (Music Week) | 36 |
| UK Pop Tip Club Chart (Music Week) | 26 |
| US Hot Dance Club Play (Billboard) | 1 |
| US Hot Dance Singles Sales (Billboard) | 15 |

== Personnel ==
- Jimmy Somerville – writing, lead vocals
- Shawn Christopher – backing vocals
- Yvonne Gage – backing vocals
- Richard Stannard – writing
- Matt Rowe – writing
- Stephen Hague – production, mixing
- Gianfranco Bortolotti – production
- Danny Weatherspoon – keyboards
- Eric Miller – remixing, arranging
- Luca Lauri – mixing, arranging
- Massimo Braghieri – arranging
- Mike Drake – remixing
- DJ R.A.F. – remixing
- Plus Staples – remixing
- George Maniatis – editing
- Jeff Luif – engineering, mixing
- Tiziano Giupponi – mixing
- Mauro Picotto – arranging
- Massimo Castrezzati – arranging
- Roberto Cipro – arranging
- Gary Butcher – writing, production, (B-side)
- Gary Wilkinson – production, mixing (B-side)

== See also ==
- List of number-one dance singles of 1995 (U.S.)
