= Hot Fudge =

US 1970s children's television series produced in Detroit, Michigan

- Also known as: The Hot Fudge Show
- Genre: Children's television series
- Starring: Arte Johnson (season 1); Larry Santos; Ron Coden; Amanda Caruthers; Yolanda Williams
- Voices of: Bob Elnicky; Larry Santos; Ron Coden
- Country of origin: United States
- No. of seasons: 4
- No. of episodes: ≥78

Production
- Producers: Barry Hurd; Bob Elnicky
- Running time: 22–24 minutes

Original release
- Network: WXYZ-TV; Syndication
- Release: September 1976 – 1980

Hot Fudge (also known as The Hot Fudge Show) is an American children's television series that was produced in Detroit by WXYZ-TV (owned and operated at the time by ABC) and distributed by the Lexington Broadcast Services Company. Originally airing only in Detroit beginning in 1974, the show grew in popularity and was syndicated nationally from 1976 to 1982; a few of WXYZ's sister ABC-owned stations (including KGO and WLS) carried the program.

== Overview ==
Featuring music, songs, and sketches with live actors and puppets (known as the "Mits") in a manner similar to Sesame Street, the show was originally hosted by Arte Johnson. The duo of the bearded musician Larry (Larry Santos) and green, fuzzy, monster-like puppet Seymour (voiced by producer Bob Elnicky) took over after the first season.

Glenn Denver, a puppet parody of John Denver, released an album titled Glenn Denver Sings Country Songs from the Hot Fudge T.V. Show. Three other Hot Fudge albums were released; The Electric Fuzz's Rock 'N Roll from the Hot Fudge T.V. Show, Larry and Seymour Sing Songs from the Hot Fudge T.V. Show, and Hooray For Friendship and 9 Other Hits from the Hot Fudge T.V. Show, Plus Nine More. All of the albums have been released on CD.

A Hot Fudge episode was submitted to the University of Georgia for a Peabody Award in 1974; though not selected for the award itself, it was retained for the university's Peabody Awards Collection Archives. The show won a Puppeteers of America ACT AWARD in 1976.

== Sketches and characters ==
- Holy Moley!: A sketch where a simple-minded man (Ron Coden) tries to outwit problems, but gets socked back.
- Name That Feeling: Professor Emotion (Ron Coden) hosts a parody of Name That Tune in which there were two versions:

Version 1 (Seasons 1 & 2): The day's "Secret Feeling" is revealed, the puppet contestant is introduced and Professor Emotion tries to get the contestant to feel the "Secret Feeling" shown under the window of the contestant's "isolation booth"
Version 2 (Seasons 3 & 4): Puppet contestants watch a video clip of other puppets and try to guess how they feel. This is shown in two parts with an in-show commercial sandwiched in-between.

- Write On!: A segment where many of the puppet characters read jokes or riddles sent in by kids.
- Newsreel: Film footage of various items such as paper being produced would be narrated by various kids in the style of a newsreel.
- Unreasonable Report: News sketches featuring Harry Unreasonable, a parody of news anchor Harry Reasoner.
- Hot Fudge Gang/The Mits/Happening!: Various sketches featuring children and adults.
- Detective Tomato (Ron Coden) giving advice to children then leaving through the door behind him, only to have something happen to him when he goes through.
- Elton Seymour: Seymour playing a tune in the guise of Elton John, usually featured at the beginning of the show.
- Mr. Nasty (Ron Coden), who loves being booed by his audience, gives tips on how to be as nasty as him...only to have the tables turned on him by his landlady in the end, prompting the audience to applaud.
- Amanda Caruthers (later replaced by Yolanda Williams) portraying various characters in sketches, often giving kindly advice to the inquiring puppets.

== Chuck E. Cheese's Pizza Time Theatre ==
For a short time in 1983, animatronic stage shows featuring the Hot Fudge characters appeared in Pizza Time Theatre restaurants in cases where a new location couldn't receive the Chuck E. Cheese branded band in time. This stage show was removed from all of the locations that had it in 1984.

This stage show was installed in the Clawson, MI, Warren, MI, Okemos, MI, Warwick, RI, Danvers, MA, and Ann Arbor, MI locations. Most locations renamed the characters based on local voting. Seymore was able to be interactive with guests, having a employee puppeteer him from backstage.

== 2007 reunion special ==
On Wednesday, December 5, 2007, Detroit PBS member station WTVS presented a 90-minute reunion special, featuring the original cast, including Larry and Seymour. The special featured memories of the program interspersed with clips from the series. A rerun of the episode was aired on December 14, 2007.

== Discography ==
- Music from the Hot Fudge Show - single on S.H.Y. Records (1974)
- The Electric Fuzz - Rock 'N Roll From The Hot Fudge T.V. Show (1983)
- Glenn Denver Sings Country Songs From The Hot Fudge T.V. Show (1983)
- Hooray for Friendship and 9 Other Hits from the Hot Fudge T.V. Show (1996)
