= An Imitation of Love =

Millie Jackson

Studio album by Millie Jackson
- Released: 1986
- Recorded: 1985
- Genre: R&B
- Length: 43:16
- Label: Jive/RCA
- Producer: Timmy Allen, Jolyon Skinner, Larry Smith, Jonathan Butler, Wayne Brathwaite

Millie Jackson chronology
E.S.P. (Extra Sexual Persuasion) (1983)	Millie Jackson (1986)	The Tide Is Turning (1988)

An Imitation Of Love was the first album from Millie Jackson on Jive/RCA, with which she signed in 1985. "Hot! Wild! Unrestricted! Crazy Love" and "Love Is a Dangerous Game" were both singles that became Top 10 Hits on the Hot R&B/Hip-Hop Singles and Tracks Chart. The album reached #119 on the Billboard Album Charts but was a far bigger success on the R&B charts, reaching #16 there. It was re-issued on CD in 2013 by the Funkytowngrooves label, remastered and with bonus tracks.

== Track listings ==
1. "Hot! Wild! Unrestricted! Crazy Love" (Millie Jackson, Timmy Allen) (5:58)
2. "Wanna Be Your Lover" (Prince) (5:54)
3. "I Fell in Love" (Millie Jackson, Timmy Allen) (6:18)
4. "An Imitation of Love" (Jolyon Skinner, Jonathan Butler, Millie Jackson) (4:12)
5. "Love is a Dangerous Game" (Jolyon Skinner, Jonathan Butler, Leslie Charles, Wayne Brathwaite) (5:58)
6. "It´s a Thang" (Larry Smith, Millie Jackson) (5:12)
7. "I Need To Be Myself" (Jolyon Skinner, Jonathan Butler, Phillip Mitchell) (5:36)
8. "Mind Over Matter" (Millie Jackson, Timmy Allen) (5:10)

== Charts ==
=== Weekly charts ===
Chart (1986–87)	Peak position
US Billboard 200	119
US Top R&B/Hip-Hop Albums (Billboard)	16

=== Year-end charts ===
Chart (1987)	Position
US Top R&B/Hip-Hop Albums (Billboard)	36
