= Feelin' Bitchy =

Studio album by Millie Jackson
- Released: August 1977
- Recorded: 1977
- Studios: Muscle Shoals, Sheffield, Alabama; A & R, New York City; United, Detroit, Michigan; Criteria, Miami, Florida
- Genre: Soul
- Length: 39:46
- Label: Spring
- Producers: Brad Shapiro, Millie Jackson

Millie Jackson chronology
Lovingly Yours (1976)	Feelin' Bitchy (1977)	Get It Out'cha System (1978)

Feelin' Bitchy is an album by the American musician Millie Jackson, released in 1977. It features two of Jackson's best known songs, the Merle Haggard cover "If You're Not Back in Love by Monday", which became a U.S. pop hit for Jackson, and the Latimore track "All the Way Lover". The latter features one of Millie's trademark extended raps, this time on the topic of men who refuse to perform oral sex on their partners. Some record stores kept the album behind the counter due to its cover photo.

== Critical reception ==
Professional ratings
Review scores
Source	Rating
AllMusic	4/5 stars
Christgau's Record Guide	B
The Virgin Encyclopedia of R&B and Soul	4/5 stars

The Bay State Banner noted that "All The Way Lover" "is a mischievous, unkind, joyously detestable yakety-yak, excused by Millie's call to Woman to take all of what men are too scared to give."

== Track listings ==
1. "All the Way Lover" (Benny Latimore) 10:44
2. "Lovin' Your Good Thing Away" (George Jackson, Raymond Moore) 3:11
3. "Angel in Your Arms" (Clayton Ivey, Terry Woodford, Tommy Brasfield) 4:02
4. "A Little Taste of Outside Love" (George Jackson) 3:41
5. "You Created a Monster" (Lamont Dozier) 2:24
6. "Cheatin' Is" (Rafe Van Hoy) 3:20
7. "If You're Not Back in Love by Monday" (Glenn Martin, Sonny Throckmorton) 4:45
8. "Feelin' Like a Woman" (David Sackoff, Randolph Klein) 4:26

== Personnel ==
- Millie Jackson – vocals
- Jimmy Johnson, Ken Bell, Larry Byrom – guitar
- David Hood – bass
- Barry Beckett, Tim Henson – keyboards
- Roger Hawkins – drums
- Tom Roady – percussion
- Spiderman Harrison – male vocals
- Brandye (Cynthia Douglas, Donna Davis, Pam Vincent) – background vocals
- David Van DePitte – horn arrangements
- Mike Lewis – string arranger

Ernie Winfrey – Remix Engineer

== Charts ==
Chart (1977)	Peak position
Billboard Pop Albums	34
Billboard Top Soul Albums	4

=== Singles ===
Year	Single	Chart positions	
Year	Single	US Pop	US Soul
1977	"If You're Not Back in Love by Monday"	43	5
1978	"All the Way Lover"	102	12

== Certifications ==
Region	Certification	Certified units/sales
United States (RIAA)	Gold	500,000^{^}
^{^} Shipments figures based on certification alone.
