= Larry Santos =

American pop music singer-songwriter (1941–2026)

Larry Santos (June 2, 1941 – April 7, 2026) was an American pop music singer-songwriter. Santos wrote songs for several American pop bands in the 1960s, including the 1963 hit "Candy Girl" for The Four Seasons which reached number 3 on Billboard Hot 100 chart. In the mid-Sixties, he recorded singles as part of a group called The Madisons, and then under his own name. He released three albums in the 1970s and scored one pop hit single, produced by Don Davis, "We Can't Hide It Anymore", which peaked on April 10, 1976, at number 36 on the Billboard Hot 100.

== Life and career ==
Santos was born in Oneonta, New York on June 2, 1941. From 1976 to 1980 Santos starred in the television show Hot Fudge, a syndicated children's puppet show broadcast from Detroit, Michigan. Santos scored the program's theme music and other songs, and appeared regularly as a live character actor. He and lead puppet Seymour would perform a duet at the piano at the end of each episode.

Additionally, Santos built a successful career writing and singing advertising jingles. Santos's songs have appeared in television commercials for Pan Am, Admiral, Chevrolet, Marathon Oil, and Budweiser among others.

Santos' baritone singing voice has been described as "gruff, but warm" and said to bear a very strong resemblance to the voice of Richie Havens. His music is considered in the genre of blue-eyed soul.

Santos died on April 7, 2026, at the age of 84.

== Discography ==
- Just a Man (Evolution 2002), 1969
- Mornin' Sun (Evolution 2015), 1969
- Legacy (Warlock 2000), 1973
- Larry Santos (Casablanca Records 7018), 1975
- You Are Everything I Need (Casablanca 7030), 1976
- Don't Let the Music Stop (Casablanca 7061), 1977
- Interplay (Overture Records 1201), 1980
- Viva Arriva (Live) (Overture Records), 1996

== Singles ==
- We Can't Hide It Anymore (December 29, 1975)
