= The Roots of My Raising =

Studio album by Merle Haggard and The Strangers
- Released: November 1976
- Genre: Country
- Label: Capitol
- Producer: Ken Nelson, Fuzzy Owen

Merle Haggard and The Strangers chronology
My Love Affair with Trains (1976)	The Roots of My Raising (1976)	Songs I'll Always Sing (1977)

Singles from The Roots of My Raising
- 1. "The Roots of My Raising" Released: January 12, 1976; 2. "Cherokee Maiden" Released: September 6, 1976

The Roots of My Raising is the twenty-first studio album by American country music singer Merle Haggard and The Strangers, released in 1976. It was his third release in 1976 and his last on the Capitol label until his return in 2004. It reached number 8 on the Billboard country albums chart.

== History ==
The album includes Haggard's last #1 hit of the decade, "Cherokee Maiden," a song written by Cindy Walker. It spent 11 weeks on the charts, reaching #1. The Tommy Collins-written title track had also gone to #1, Haggard's ninth consecutive chart topper stretching back to 1973 and twenty-third number one overall. The album also features material originally recorded by Jimmie Rodgers and Lefty Frizzell, two of Haggard's biggest musical influences.

== Critical reception ==
Professional ratings
Review scores
Source	Rating
AllMusic	4/5 stars

Thom Jurek of AllMusic enthuses that Haggard's final Capitol album was "a hell of a way to go out" and calls "What Have You Got Planned Tonight, Diana," "one of Haggard's most overlooked gems." In his essay for the 1994 Haggard box set Down Every Road, music journalist Daniel Cooper observes, "While the #1 hits had not dried up for Merle, and while he still had the power to slay on isolated non-hits like 'What Have You Got Planned Tonight, Diana,' his overall output the last years on Capitol had started to sound a bit uninspired."

== Track listing ==
1. "The Roots of My Raising" (Tommy Collins)
2. "What Have You Got Planned Tonight, Diana" (Dave Kirby)
3. "The Waltz You Saved for Me" (Gus Kahn, Wayne King, Emil Flindt)
4. "Walk on the Outside" (Kirby, Chuck Howard)
5. "Gambling Polka Dot Blues" (Jimmie Rodgers, Roy E. Hall)
6. "Cherokee Maiden" (Cindy Walker)
7. "Am I Standing in Your Way" (Merle Haggard)
8. "Colorado" (Kirby)
9. "I Never Go Around Mirrors" (Lefty Frizzell, Sanger D. Shafer)
10. "Mississippi Delta Blues" (Rodgers, Jack Neville)

== Personnel ==
- Merle Haggard – vocals, guitar

The Strangers:

- Roy Nichols – lead guitar
- Norman Hamlet – steel guitar, dobro
- Tiny Moore – mandolin
- Eldon Shamblin – guitar
- Ronnie Reno – guitar
- Mark Yeary – piano
- James Tittle – bass
- Biff Adam – drums
- Don Markham – saxophone

With

- Dave Kirby – guitar
- Bobby Wayne – guitar
- Dennis Hromek – bass
- Johnny Gimble – fiddle

and

- Hargus "Pig" Robbins – piano, organ
- Glen D. Hardin – piano

== Chart positions ==
Year	Chart	Position
1977	Billboard Country albums	8
