= We Can't Hide It Anymore =

Single by Larry Santos

from the album Larry Santos
- B-side: "Can't Get You Off My Mind"
- Released: December 1975
- Recorded: 1975
- Genre: Pop
- Length: 3:47
- Label: Casablanca
- Songwriter: Barry Murphy
- Producer: Don Davis

Larry Santos singles chronology
"The Way I Love You" (1973)	"We Can't Hide It Anymore" (1975)	"Long, Long Time" (1976)

"We Can't Hide It Anymore" is an American pop music song written by Barry Murphy and first recorded by Larry Santos. It appeared on Santos' 1975 album Larry Santos and the single reached number 36 on Billboard magazine's Billboard Hot 100 chart in April 1976.

== Chart performance ==
Chart (1976)	Peak position
U.S. Billboard Easy Listening	26
US Billboard Hot 100	36

== Cover versions ==
- It was also recorded by Richie Havens for his 1976 album The End of the Beginning;
- The trio Facts of Life covered the song on their 1978 album A Matter of Fact.
