= Keisha Jackson =

American singer

- Born: August 17, 1965 (age 61); Brooklyn, New York, U.S.
- Origin: Atlanta, Georgia, U.S.
- Genres: R&B, soul, new jack swing
- Occupation: Singer
- Instrument: Singing
- Years active: 1989-present
- Labels: LaFace; Columbia; Warner Bros
- Website: keishajackson.com

Keisha Jackson is an American R&B singer, and is the daughter of R&B & soul singer-songwriter Millie Jackson.

== Life and career ==
Having grown up in a family rich with music history, Keisha's childhood was immersed in music. People like the Isley Brothers and the O'Jays would visit her house, and she worked as a background singer for her mom when she was fifteen. Keisha Jackson went to college for two and a half years before moving to Atlanta, Georgia, where she tried to pursue a music career. She formed a girl group with her friend called Obsession and played the clubs around Atlanta.

Keisha then got an opportunity to record an album, and in 1989, released her self-titled debut. The album scored a minor hit with its single, “Hot Little Love Affair” which reached #39 on the charts. In 1991, Keisha released a second effort, titled Keisha, which featured the single “Mature Love.” The track failed to make a big impression and peaked at #80 on the R&B charts.

Keisha then began working with LaFace Records as a background vocalist on tracks with Toni Braxton, Whitney Houston and Bobby Brown. She became involved with a Warner Bros. Records plan to form a group called Black Coffy and was signed to the project. However, the group was dropped before ever releasing any recordings. Today, Keisha continues to record and perform, and has started her own agency titled One Voice Entertainment. She performs often as a backup singer with Erykah Badu's band and has provided background vocals for Joss Stone, Angie Stone, OutKast and Faith Evans.

In 2024, it was reported that Jackson was recovering from brain surgery.

== Discography ==
- Keisha Jackson (1989)
- Keisha (1991)
