= Kayvette Records =

Kayvette Records was an American independent record label that began in 1975, owned by T.K. Records, and came to a close in late 1981. It had musical artists and groups, such as Facts of Life, Jackie Moore, Otis Clay, Brandye, The Gospel Truth, The Meadows Brothers, and The Citizen Band on its roster.
