= Facts of Life (band) =

- Genres: Soul/disco
- Labels: Kayvette, RCA
- Past members: Millie Jackson; Jean Davis; Keith Williams; Chuck Carter

Facts of Life was an American soul/disco group formed by producer Millie Jackson, whose members were Jean Davis (sister of Tyrone Davis), Keith Williams, and Chuck Carter. They signed to independent label Kayvette Records, and a single, "Caught in the Middle", got airplay on Southern US radio stations but did not chart. Their second single was "Sometimes", a remake of country singer Bill Anderson's smash hit; Facts of Life's version hit #3 on the US Black Singles chart and #31 on the pop charts in 1977. As a result of the single's success, Kayvette rushed the album release, resulting in a bad pressing (the outer cover contained a number of spelling errors). Nevertheless, RCA picked up the group in 1978, but their second album was not very successful, and the group fizzled.

== Discography ==
- Sometimes (Kayvette Records, 1977) US #146, US Black Albums #33
- A Matter of Fact (RCA Records, 1978) US Black Albums #54
