= Millie Jackson =

American singer of dance and soul, mother of hip-hop (born 1944)

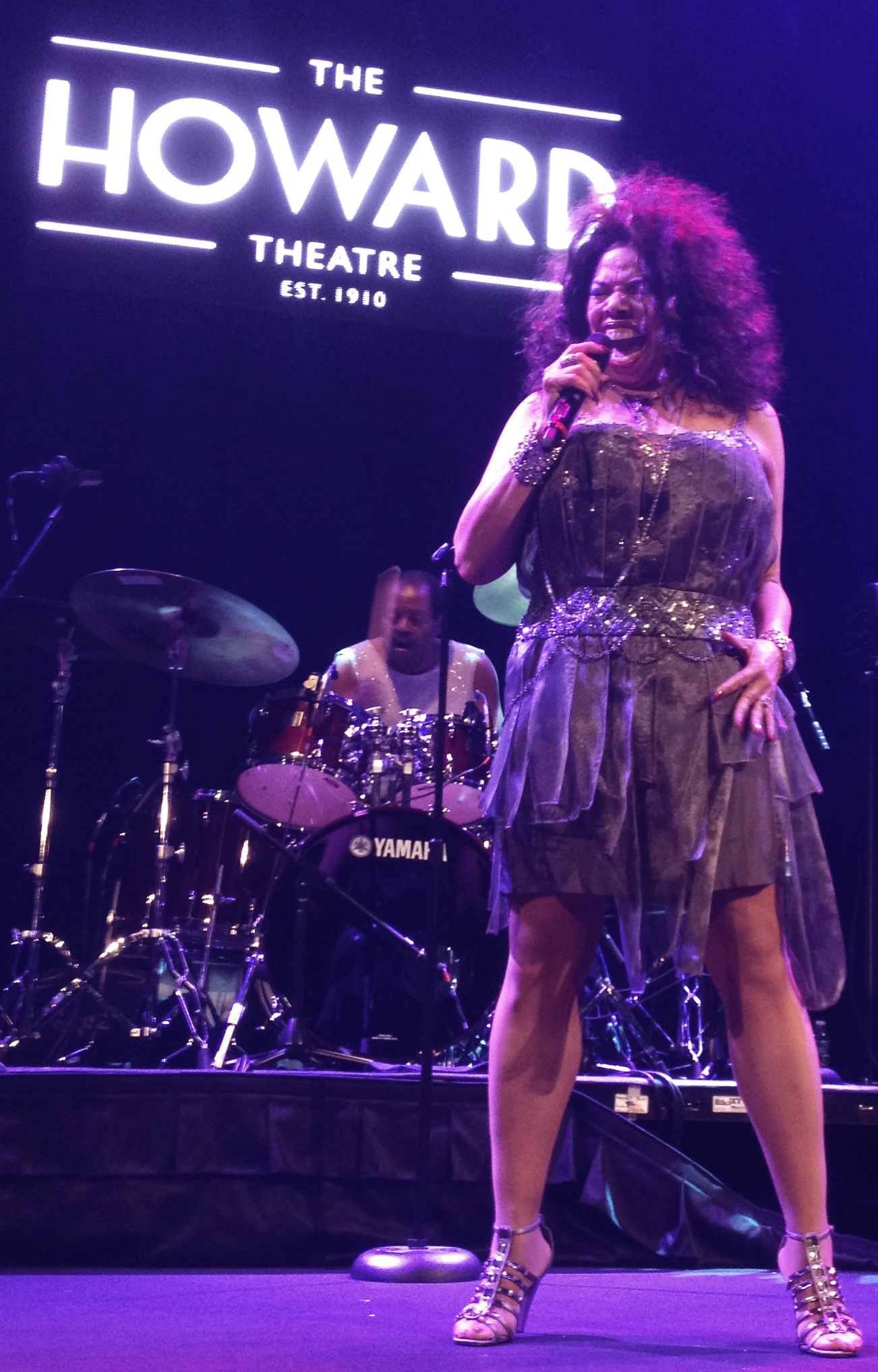
- Jackson performing at the Howard Theatre in 2012

Background information
- Born: Mildred Virginia Jackson; July 15, 1944 (age 82); Thomson, Georgia, U.S.
- Genres: Soul; disco; R&B
- Occupations: Singer; songwriter; model
- Instrument: Vocals
- Years active: 1964–present
- Labels: MGM; Spring; Polydor; Sire/Warner Bros.; Jive/BMG; Ichiban; Wierd
- Website: weirdwreckuds.com aj-productions.com

Mildred Virginia Jackson (born July 15, 1944) is an American R&B and soul recording artist. Beginning her career in the early 1960s, three of Jackson's albums were certified gold by the RIAA for over 500,000 copies sold. Jackson's songs often include long spoken sections, sometimes humorous, sometimes sexually explicit. According to the cataloging site WhoSampled.com, her music has been sampled in over 300 songs.

Since she always enjoyed writing poems, Jackson began crafting proto-hip-hop R&B singles in the early 1970s, such as the outspoken "A Child of God (It's Hard to Believe)".

== Early life ==
Born in Thomson, Georgia, Jackson is the daughter of a sharecropper, Jubilee Jackson. Her mother died when she was a child and, subsequently, she and her father moved to the New York City area and settled in Newark, New Jersey. By the time Jackson was in her mid-teens, she had moved into New York City to live with an aunt who resided in Brooklyn. She found an occasional modeling gig for magazines like JIVE and Sepia.

In 1964, Jackson performed at a club in New York City. She subsequently appeared in a "string of one nighters" after this. Her performance was mostly talk and spoken words, but her onstage banter would become a focal point in her stage act. This banter stemmed from her being unsure of what to do in front of the crowd.

"I just talked to the audience because I was nervous," Jackson said. "Then my label (Spring) wanted to record it like I was doing it live. It was longer than a three-minute single, but not quite a whole album side so I said, 'We need to keep this story going.'"

== Career ==
Jackson's recording career reportedly began on a dare to enter a 1964 talent contest at Harlem nightclub Smalls Paradise, which she won. Although she first recorded for MGM Records in 1970, she soon left and began a long association with New York-based Spring Records. Working with the label's in-house producer, Raeford Gerald, her first single to chart was 1971's "A Child of God (It's Hard to Believe)," which reached number 22 on the R&B chart. In 1972, Jackson had her first R&B top ten single with the follow-up, "Ask Me What You Want", which also reached the pop top 30, then "My Man, A Sweet Man" reached No. 7 R&B and No. 50 on the UK Singles Chart; all three songs were co-written by Jackson. "My Man, A Sweet Man" was a northern soul hit record in the UK as was her 1976 recording "A House for Sale". The following year brought her third US R&B top ten hit, "It Hurts So Good," which made No. 3 on the R&B chart and No. 24 on the US Billboard Hot 100 pop chart. The single was featured on the album of the same name and in the blaxploitation film Cleopatra Jones.

In 1974, she released the album Caught Up, which introduced her innovative style of raunchy spoken words. The featured release was her version of Luther Ingram's million-seller, "(If Loving You Is Wrong) I Don't Want to Be Right", for which she received a Grammy nomination. By now, she had switched producers to work only with Brad Shapiro, who had been involved with "It Hurts So Good" and "Love Doctor". Working at Muscle Shoals Studio in Alabama with the renowned Muscle Shoals Rhythm Section, she continued to record most of her material for Spring there, including the follow-up album, Still Caught Up. Over the next ten years, Jackson had a string of successful albums and numerous R&B chart entries, the biggest being her 1977 version of Merle Haggard's country hit "If We're Not Back in Love By Monday". That single was followed by many more, including her version of the Boney M. song the disco single "Never Change Lovers in the Middle of The Night." This single peaked at No. 33 on the Billboard R&B chart in 1979.

Jackson recorded an album in 1979 with Isaac Hayes called Royal Rappin's and the same year saw her release a double album, Live and Uncensored, recorded in concert at Los Angeles venue the Roxy and Live and Outrageous at Atlanta's Mr. V's Figure8. Jackson also formed and produced the group Facts of Life. It had a major hit in 1976 with "Sometimes" (No. 3 R&B, No. 31 Pop). Jackson found herself without a label when Spring closed down in 1984, but in 1986, she signed with Jive Records in a deal that produced four albums and resulted in further R&B top ten hits with "Hot! Wild! Unrestricted! Crazy Love" and "Love Is a Dangerous Game". She appeared on an Elton John track in 1985, "Act of War", which was a top 40 hit in the UK, but failed to chart in the US. In 1991, she wrote, produced and starred in the successful touring play Young Man, Older Woman, based on her album of the same title for Jive. On November 24, 1994, Jackson appeared in the Thanksgiving episode "Feast or Famine" of Martin as Florine. In 2000, her voice featured in "Am I Wrong" by Etienne de Crécy, sampled from her performance in "(If Loving You Is Wrong) I Don't Want to Be Right".

Jackson has frequently appeared on "worst ever" lists for her album covers. E.S.P. (Extra Sexual Persuasion) features Jackson peering into a crystal ball that accentuates her cleavage; Back to the S**t! depicts Jackson sitting on a toilet where it is implied she is defecating.

Jackson now runs her own record label, Weird Wreckuds. After a lengthy hiatus from recording, she released her 2001 album, Not for Church Folk, which marked a return to her style with an Urban contemporary sound. The album features the singles "Butt-A-Cize" and "Leave Me Alone". The album also features a collaboration with rapper Da Brat on the song "In My Life". Jackson had her own radio show in Dallas, Texas, for 13 years. Broadcasting via remote from her home in Atlanta, Georgia, Jackson worked in afternoon drive-time from 3–6 pm on KKDA 730 AM, until January 6, 2012.

In 2006, five of Jackson's best-selling albums—Millie Jackson (1972), It Hurts So Good (1973), Caught Up (1974), Still Caught Up (1975), and Feelin' Bitchy (1977)—were digitally remastered and released on CD with bonus tracks. All of Jackson's Spring Records-era albums are available from Ace Records in the UK. An Imitation of Love was re-issued on CD in 2013 by the Funkytowngrooves label in a remastered, expanded edition. Other albums released on the Jive and Ichiban labels remain out of print, though some of those songs appear on compilation CDs. On February 6, 2012, the documentary, Unsung: the Story of Mildred 'Millie' Jackson aired on the TV One network. Jackson performed at Washington, D.C.'s historic Howard Theatre on August 3, 2012, and at B.B. King's Blues Club in New York on August 4, 2012. On June 6, 2015, Jackson was inducted into the Official Rhythm & Blues Music Hall of Fame in Clarksdale, Mississippi. Jackson also starred in Joe's College Road Trip as Geraldine, a R&B singer at a club on Beale Street.

== Personal life ==
Jackson has two children: singer Keisha Jackson, and a son. Jackson was married for a period of eight months to Victor Davis.

== Discography ==
=== Albums ===
| Year | Album | Chart positions | | | | Certification |
| Year | Album | US | US R&B | AUS | UK | Certification |
|---|---|---|---|---|---|---|
| 1972 | Millie Jackson | 166 | — | — | — | |
| 1973 | It Hurts So Good | 175 | 13 | — | — | |
| 1974 | I Got to Try It One Time | — | — | — | — | |
| 1974 | Caught Up | 21 | 4 | — | — | RIAA: Gold |
| 1975 | Still Caught Up | 112 | 27 | 96 | — | |
| 1976 | Free and in Love | — | 17 | — | — | |
| 1977 | Lovingly Yours | 175 | 44 | — | — | |
| 1977 | Feelin' Bitchy | 34 | 4 | — | — | RIAA: Gold |
| 1978 | Get It Out'cha System | 55 | 14 | — | — | RIAA: Gold |
| 1979 | A Moment's Pleasure | 144 | 47 | — | — | |
| 1979 | Royal Rappin's (with Isaac Hayes) | 80 | 17 | — | — | |
| 1979 | Live & Uncensored | 94 | 22 | — | 81 | |
| 1980 | For Men Only | 100 | 23 | — | — | |
| 1980 | I Had to Say It | 137 | 25 | — | — | |
| 1981 | Just a Lil' Bit Country | 201 | 43 | — | — | |
| 1982 | Hard Times | 201 | 29 | — | — | |
| 1982 | Live and Outrageous | 113 | 11 | — | — | |
| 1983 | E.S.P. (Extra Sexual Persuasion) | — | 40 | — | 59 | |
| 1986 | An Imitation of Love | 119 | 16 | — | — | |
| 1988 | The Tide Is Turning | — | — | — | — | |
| 1989 | Back to the S**t! | — | 79 | — | — | |
| 1991 | Young Man, Older Woman | — | — | — | — | |
| 1993 | Young Man, Older Woman: Cast Album | — | — | — | — | |
| 1994 | Rock N' Soul | — | — | — | — | |
| 1995 | It's Over | — | — | — | — | |
| 1997 | The Sequel, It Ain't Over | — | — | — | — | |
| 2001 | Not for Church Folk! | — | — | — | — | |
| 2014 | On the Soul Country Side | — | — | — | — | |
"—" denotes a recording that did not chart or was not released in that territory.

=== Singles ===
| Year | Single | Chart positions | | | Album |
| Year | Single | US | US R&B | UK | Album |
|---|---|---|---|---|---|
| 1971 | "A Child of God" | 102 | 22 | — | Millie Jackson |
| 1972 | "Ask Me What You Want" | 27 | 4 | — | Millie Jackson |
| 1972 | "My Man, a Sweet Man" | 42 | 7 | 50 | Millie Jackson |
| 1972 | "I Miss You Baby" | 95 | 22 | — | Millie Jackson |
| 1973 | "Breakaway" | 110 | 16 | — | It Hurts So Good |
| 1973 | "It Hurts So Good" | 24 | 3 | — | It Hurts So Good |
| 1974 | "I Got to Try It One Time" | — | 21 | — | I Got to Try It One Time |
| 1974 | "How Do You Feel the Morning After" | 77 | 11 | — | I Got to Try It One Time |
| 1975 | "The Rap" | — | 42 | — | Caught Up |
| 1975 | "(If Loving You Is Wrong) I Don't Want to Be Right" | 42 | (flip) | — | Caught Up |
| 1975 | "I'm Through Trying to Prove My Love to You" | — | 58 | — | Caught Up |
| 1975 | "Leftovers" | 87 | 17 | — | Still Caught Up |
| 1975 | "Loving Arms" | — | 45 | — | Still Caught Up |
| 1976 | "Bad Risk" | — | 24 | — | Free and in Love |
| 1976 | "There You Are" | — | (flip) | — | Free and in Love |
| 1976 | "Feel Like Making Love" | — | 71 | — | Free and in Love |
| 1977 | "I Can't Say Goodbye" | — | 40 | — | Lovingly Yours |
| 1977 | "A Love of Your Own" | — | 87 | — | Lovingly Yours |
| 1977 | "If You're Not Back in Love By Monday" | 43 | 5 | — | Feelin' Bitchy |
| 1978 | "All the Way Lover" | 102 | 12 | — | Feelin' Bitchy |
| 1978 | "Sweet Music Man" | — | 33 | — | Get It Out'cha System |
| 1978 | "Keep the Home Fires Burnin'" | — | 83 | — | Get It Out'cha System |
| 1979 | "Never Change Lovers in the Middle of the Night" | — | 33 | — | A Moment's Pleasure |
| 1979 | "A Moment's Pleasure" | — | 70 | — | A Moment's Pleasure |
| 1979 | "We Got to Hit It Off" | — | 56 | — | A Moment's Pleasure |
| 1979 | "Do You Wanna Make Love" (with Isaac Hayes) | — | 30 | — | Royal Rappin's |
| 1980 | "Didn't I Blow Your Mind" | — | 49 | — | Live & Uncensored |
| 1980 | "You Never Cross My Mind" (with Isaac Hayes) | — | 78 | — | Royal Rappin's |
| 1980 | "Despair" | — | 61 | — | For Men Only |
| 1980 | "This Is It (Part One)" | — | 88 | — | For Men Only |
| 1981 | "I Can't Stop Loving You" | — | 62 | — | Just a Lil' Bit Country |
| 1982 | "Special Occasion" | — | 51 | — | Hard Times |
| 1983 | "I Feel Like Walking in the Rain" | — | 58 | 55 | E.S.P. (Extra Sexual Persuasion) |
| 1985 | "Act of War" (with Elton John) | — | — | 32 | Non-album single |
| 1986 | "Hot Wild Unrestricted Crazy Love" | — | 9 | 99 | An Imitation of Love |
| 1987 | "Love Is a Dangerous Game" | — | 6 | 81 | An Imitation of Love |
| 1987 | "An Imitation of Love" | — | 58 | — | An Imitation of Love |
| 1987 | "It's a Thang" | — | 79 | — | An Imitation of Love |
| 1987 | "Be Yourself" (with Whodini) | — | 20 | — | Open Sesame |
| 1988 | "Something You Can Feel" | — | 45 | — | The Tide Is Turning |
"—" denotes a recording that did not chart or was not released in that territory.
