= Brad Shapiro =

Bradley Aaron Shapiro (August 15, 1938 — October 3, 2024) was an American musician, songwriter, and record producer whose credits have included work with Wilson Pickett, Millie Jackson, James Brown, and the J. Geils Band.

Shapiro was born in Rochester, New York. In the late 1950s, he played bass guitar in a local band, the Redcoats, in Miami, Florida, whose singer was Steve Alaimo. After Alaimo launched a solo career, the band split up, but Shapiro remained involved in the music business and received his first songwriting credit in 1965 on "I Can't See Him Again" by the Twans, co-written with Henry Stone. In 1967, his song "Girl, I Got News For You", co-written with Bobby Puccetti and co-produced by Shapiro and Alaimo, was recorded by Benny Latimore, and over the next few years his songs were recorded by a number of artists on T.K. labels in Miami, including Betty Wright and Clarence Reid. He often wrote and co-produced with Alaimo.

In 1970, he and Dave Crawford began working together at Atlantic Records and co-produced the debut album by The J. Geils Band. The following year, he and Crawford co-produced Wilson Pickett's "Don't Knock My Love" at Muscle Shoals, which Shapiro co-wrote with the singer. The record reached number one on the R&B chart. Shapiro continued to work with Pickett, as well as with Johnny Adams, Sam & Dave, Bettye LaVette, and others for Atlantic.

Shapiro then became involved with producing the leading artists on the New York–based Spring Records, including Joe Simon, Garland Green, and Millie Jackson. The most successful collaboration was with Jackson; the two co-produced and co-wrote several tracks on her gold albums Caught Up (1974) and Still Caught Up (1975). He went on to work with Millie Jackson for some years on a series of albums and major R&B hits until the Spring label closed in the mid-1980s.

In the mid-1970s, he co-founded the Kayvette record label, which issued records by Jackie Moore, Otis Clay, and the Facts of Life (formerly the Gospel Truth). Shapiro produced James Brown's albums The Original Disco Man in 1979 and People in 1980.

Shapiro died in Lebanon, Tennessee.
