= Jimmy Somerville discography =

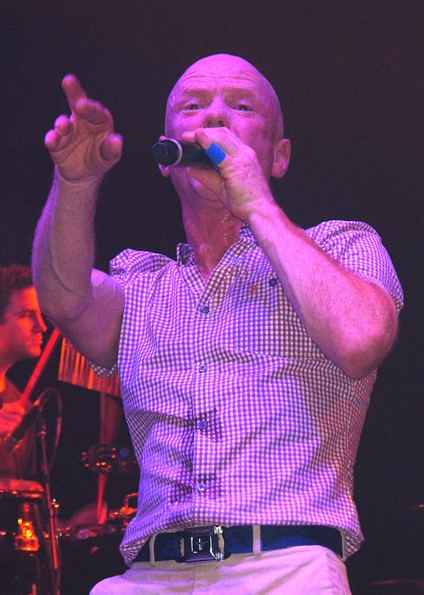
- Singer performing during the 10th anniversary of Here and Now Tour, held on 25 June 2011 at the Echo Arena in Liverpool, England.

Releases: (Note: Since early recordings were released by Jimmy Somerville as the frontman of Bronski Beat or the Communards, many of these were later credited to either of the parties or each, respectively, while some others were often attributed to only act, even though they would feature contributions by the fellow one too. Likewise, many of his sales figures combine both the number of sale of his own solo records and those sold with his former groups in common. For that reason as well to preserve the singer's discography in a chronological order, the list includes his entire body of work, regardless of its original release, reissue and/or rework.)
Studio albums	9
Remix albums	3
Live albums	5
Compilation albums	10
EPs	4
Singles	39
Download singles	15
Promotional singles	4
Other songs	61
Video albums/EPs	5
Music videos	38

Scottish recording artist Jimmy Somerville entered the music industry as the frontman of the synth-pop act Bronski Beat. Alongside, he would score an early international success with a series of top-ten hits, such as "Smalltown Boy", "Why?" and "I Feel Love Medley"; all taken from the trio's debut album, The Age of Consent (1984), as well the remix equivalent, Hundreds & Thousands (1985). A similar status enjoyed the follow-up hit singles: "Don't Leave Me This Way", "So Cold the Night" and "Never Can Say Goodbye"; these though, were recorded for the eponymous set of his later duo Communards (1986), or its Red successor (1987) yet. The singer's own full-length debut would see its eventual results at the very end of the 1980s, marking the ending of his former bands' years, or rather the beginning of his solo era since.

Until now, Somerville has released nine studio albums; mostly on London Recordings, the latters through various independent labels. One conceptual work has initially been published by himself, for a change. In addition to three remixed collections, five live albums and ten retrospective compilations, two of which are double sets, he has also delivered four extended plays (EP); these more or less self-published again. His singles discography counts to thirty-nine physical releases—excluding four promotional-only—fifteen digital and over sixty other appearances; regardless of their format. Apart from that, he has been included on three video albums, two video EPs, and has made thirty-five music videos; with three further being "captured" in just vocally.

His principal debut arrived on 27 November 1989 under title Read My Lips. The outcome spawned two top-ten compositions, namely "Comment te dire adieu", performed as a duet with June Miles-Kingston, and "You Make Me Feel (Mighty Real)", another revival. While the lead cover went on to be certified Silver by the Syndicat national de l'édition phonographique (SNEP), the album itself Gold by the SNEP and the British Phonographic Industry (BPI); breaking into the top-forty of the music charts in France, Germany, Italy and the United Kingdom. The titular track, written solely by musician, received a short-running but decent response on a single of its own.

By the time The Singles Collection 1984/1990 was issued for the next Christmas season, the combining sales of all his records were estimated by Music & Media for more than six million units, with France becoming the singer's most successful territory then. Upon its release on 12 November 1990, his first best-of set continued selling streak across the European continent, earning both Platinum and Gold certifications; each twice and respectively. The first two from the French SNEP and the Swiss IFPI, the latters from the Dutch NVPI and the German BVMI. Having reached the additional top-ten spots in Austria, Belgium, Ireland and the UK, the compilation recycled for its opening single also one of the Bee Gees' songs, "To Love Somebody", and likewise the remaining "Run from Love", previously not promoted commercially.

Even though, the management had expected their artist publishing a new material already the upcoming year, Somerville semi-retired from the business for four years. His one-off projects involved him only in recording themed tunes for the feature film Orlando (1992), or a short called The Attendant (1993). Simultaneously, he contributed for a charitable EP of duets, Gimme Shelter (1993).

The singer's second studio effort, Dare to Love, was launched on 12 June 1995. Despite its favorable reviews, the album somewhat failed to match the sales of its predecessors. Having missed the top-forty, except for the UK, it ultimately became his closing release on London Recordings. The lead-off singles, however, they did make an impact, either in the dance or airplay field. While "Heartbeat" received club play on both sides of the Atlantic, topping the US Dance eventually, "Hurt So Good" cracked into the mainstream top-ten in his homeland, and turned into a radio favorite in England, too. Besides in July 1997, Somerville experienced a late comeback, after "Safe in These Arms" had been reproduced for the dancefloor via German-based SPV GmbH. Altered as "Safe", it climbed to the number-one on the Spanish singles chart, and gained him club following in the United States.

Subsequently, musician managed to secure a record deal with Gut Records, and to release a number of singles, some of which would garner attention within their genre. Among those were "Dark Sky", "Lay Down" and "Something to Live for". On 14 June 1999, his third solo album came, backed up in the U.S. later with a remix companion, Root Beer (2000). Nevertheless, unlike its supporting cuts, Manage the Damage suffered from a short-lived potential in general, and the label parted ways with their protégé. Shortly though, his rendition of "Can't Take My Eyes Off You" appeared on the spare soundtrack to the TV series Queer as Folk (2000), roofed by Almighty Records. In March 2001, the song resulted in his first chart entry in almost a decade in France.

Following another four-year hiatus, Somerville—no longer part of the pop culture that brought him once a global recognition—pursued local options instead. Upon signing to Jinx Musix, he would present several further singles, particularly towards the German audience, and sealed them by introducing his fourth studio set. These included "It's So Good", "Come On" and the only charting "Ain't No Mountain High Enough". Distributed through BMG in few other countries, Home Again was issued on 8 November 2004 to friendly reviews, but a limited commercial performance.

For the next years to come, much of his own output was showcased to his fanbase, primarily, in a virtual format. Apart from an acoustic collection of cover versions named Suddenly Last Summer (2009), artist also gradually published a trilogy of electronic EPs, such as Bright Thing (2010), Momentum (2011) and Solent (2012); all marketed via The Orchard online music distribution. Many of the compositions featured on those, would serve instrumental for the singer's most recent album entitled Homage, which was co-released on 6 March 2015 by German Membran and British Strike Force Entertainment to positive feedback from music critics, yet again moderate sales.

== Albums ==
=== Studio albums ===
Title details	Peak chart positions										Certifications (Note: According to the promotional material, published in Music & Media on 18 November 1989, one of the Somerville's earlier recordings had allegedly received a gold certification also in Belgium. The source, however, does neither specify any further details about the award, nor the work in dispute.)	Sales (Note: Unless stated otherwise, sales denotes pure figures without equivalent units, such as streaming and/or digital download.)
Title details	SCO	AUS	FRA (Note: As of December 2017, Somerville sold 1,873,300 recordings in the country himself, including 854,300 of albums and 1,019,000 of singles, respectively, while additional 1,825,500 copies in common with the Communards—making it in total almost 3,7 million (excluding his sales with Bronski Beat yet.))	GER	ITA	NLD	NZD (Note: The official website for the New Zealand music charts—nztop40.co.nz—as well the Dutch record association NVPI that certifies sales of recordings in the country, both archive the artist's name misspelled as "Jimmy Sommerville".)	SWI	UK	US	Certifications	Sales
As featured artist
The Age of Consent†: Released: October 1984; Label: FF • London • MCA (US); Format: LP • CD • MC	45	12	14	10	14	4	5	7	4	36	CAN: Platinum; FRA: Gold; GER: Gold; NLD: Gold; NZD: Platinum; UK: Platinum	CAN: 100,000 (Note: Based on the liner notes of a Canadian promotional cassette tape, issued in 1991, "[Somerville] has already sold over 160,000 albums in Canada." Since his only charting album in the region was The Age of Consent, it is assumed that the figure relates to the mentioned release. Officially, only 100,000 units were certified by now.); FRA: 243,900; GER: 250,000; NLD: 50,000; NZD: 15,000; UK: 300,000
Communards‡: Released: July 1986; Label: London • MCA (US); Format: LP • CD • MC	63	20	8	15	18	5	26	10	7	90	FRA: Gold; SPA:2×Platinum; UK: Platinum	FRA: 256,400; SPA: 200,000; UK: 300,000
Red‡: Released: October 1987; Label: London • MCA (US); Format: LP • CD • MC	52	97	3	22	19	32	29	20	4	93	FRA: 2×Gold; SPA: Platinum; SWI: Gold; UK: Platinum	FRA: 336,100; SPA: 100,000; SWI: 25,000; UK: 300,000
As lead artist
Read My Lips: Released: 27 November 1989; Label: London • PolyGram (US); Format: LP • CD • MC	19	114	6	29	25	—	—	—	29	192	FRA: Gold; UK: Gold	FRA: 249,600; UK: 100,000
Dare to Love: Released: 12 June 1995; Label: London; Format: LP • CD • MC	43	—	—	79	—	—	—	45	38	(Note: In the U.S., Dare to Love charted on the Heatseekers Albums, peaking at number 36 in December 1995.)		
Manage the Damage: Released: 14 June 1999; Label: Gut • Instinct (US); Format: CD • MC	—	—	—	—	—	—	—	—	—	(Note: In the States, Manage the Damage charted only on the US CMJ Top 200 Albums, peaking at number 191 in January 2000. (On the magazine's Radio 200 ADDS list, the title was earlier promoted at number 9.))		
Home Again: Released: 8 November 2004; Label: Jinx Musix • BMG; Format: CD • MC	—	—	—	48	—	—	—	—	—	(Note: Home Again was not released in North America, and therefore it was ineligible to enter the local music charts.)		
Suddenly Last Summer: Released: 18 May 2009; Label: S/P (Note: All self-published download releases, such as Suddenly Last Summer (2009), Bright Thing (2010), Momentum (2011) and Solent (2012), were originally distributed by the Orchard company.); Format: download (Note: Basic, twelve track digital releases—both self-published—featured also one live or remixed bonus of "Motherless Child"; the latter exclusively via Amazon. A year later, fourteen track limited CD was co-issued by SFE/Cherry Red, along with an extra DVD. Apart from alternate versions of two songs, the digipak included also one new song ("By Your Side") and the live Amazon cut. While a non-DVD edition which followed on SFE in 2020, featured in addition two previously unreleased works ("The Gal From Joe's" and "Bent in the Bush"), as well as live ("I Just Don't Know What to Do with Myself"), alternate ("By Your Side") or remixed ("People Are Strange") material. Its vinyl equivalent was reduced to fourteen track release.)	—	—	—	—	—	—	—	—	—	—		
Homage: Released: 6 March 2015; Label: Membran • SFE; Format: CD • download • 2×LP (limited)	—	—	60 (Note: While the French InfoDisc reports peak position at 54, the chartsinfrance.net at number 60.)	—	—	—	—	—	(Note: Homage didn't enter the British Albums Chart, it did however charted among the UK Indie Records, peaking at number 41.)	(Note: In the U.S., Homage charted on the Top Dance/Electronic Albums, peaking upon its release at number 25.)		
Keys: † as Bronski Beat • ‡ as The Communards "—" denotes releases that did not chart or were not released in the region

=== Remix albums ===
Title details	Notes
As featured artist
Hundreds & Thousands†: Released: September 1985; Label: FF • London • MCA (US); Format: LP • CD • MC	The closing release with Bronski Beat, combining remixes of four songs and two new tracks ("Run from Love"/"Hard Rain"). CD and MC versions included also a mix of "I Feel Love", plus three B-sides of earlier singles. The set charted in the UK at number 24, receiving a Silver certificate for the sale of 60,000 units, while on US Dance at number 18, being classified as an EP.
As lead artist
Root Beer: Released: 8 August 2000(US only); Label: Instinct • Gut; Format: CD	Ten track US release, featuring six remixes of his four solo singles since the post-Dare To Love era, such as "Safe", "Dark Sky", "Something to Live for" and "Lay Down", as well four B-sides from the Manage the Damage recording sessions: "Tear Fool", "Blame", "I Believe" and "Moving On". (The album did not chart.)
Club Homage: Released: 29 April 2016; Label: Membran • SFE; Format: LP • CD / download	Eleven track release featuring six remixed songs, all taken from the corresponding "disco" album. A limited LP equivalent called 12" of Homage, for a change, was issued on double vinyl for the Record Store Day 2015 with eight mixes of four tracks; two of each. (In May 2019, a digital version of the CD edition debuted on the Brazilian iTunes Albums Chart at number 19.)
Keys: † as Bronski Beat

=== Live albums ===
Title details	Notes
As featured artist
Storm Paris‡: Released: 1988 (UK only); Label: London; Format: LP (3×12")	Triple UK single set, also known as A six part souvenir of the Red Tour, combining three 12-inch singles of "For a Friend", each with four tracks (two of them repeatedly). Recorded in December 1987 at the Olympia in Paris, France. (In 2012, released also on CD as part of the Red double disc reissue.)
Evolution (with MGLC): Released: March 2007(AUS only); Label: MGLC; Format: CD	Sixteen track special-purpose release, recorded partially during the singer's 'Evolve' concert at the Hamer Hall, Melbourne, Australia on 2 March 2006, and partially during the two MGLC shows that took place at the Prahran Town Hall on 1–2 July that year. Somerville though is featured only on two compositions: "You Are My World" and "Something to Live for" (both performed with the choir also for the Mardi Gras Festival 2006, held in advance at the Sydney's State Theatre).
Our Friends Acoustic (with VA): Released: 2011; Label: Mencap; Format: USB flash drive	Special-purpose release, recorded during a benefit concert from 13 May 2010 at the IndigO², London. Although, singer performed four songs: "You Make Me Feel (Mighty Real)", "Why?", "Don't Leave Me This Way" and "Smalltown Boy"; only two latter would appear on the medium. The flash drive which included also photos and biographies of all performers, was sold via the OurFriendsAcousticStore.com in support of the Mencap charity.
As lead artist
Live at Rewind Festival 2014: Released: 17 August 2014; Label: Concert Live; Format: download	Mini-album featuring six live songs, recorded during the Rewind South: The 80s Festival, held at Temple Island Meadows, Remenham, England, on 17 August 2014. The release was sold instantly after the event via both the now defunct label's as well the Rewind Festival App website.
Live and Acoustic at Stella Polaris: Released: 29 July 2016; Label: SFE; Format: LP • CD • download	Ten track limited release featuring acoustic versions of nine songs, as well a revival of "I Just Don't Know What to Do with Myself", recorded at the Frederiksberg Gardens, Copenhagen, Denmark on 2 August 2015 during the Stella Polaris festival. (In August 2016, the album entered the Wallonia's Ultratop chart, debuting at number 127.)
Keys: ‡ as The Communards

=== Compilation albums ===
Title details	Peak chart positions										Certifications	Sales
Title details	SCO	AUS	FRA	GER	ITA	NLD	NZD	SWI	UK	US	Certifications	Sales
As featured artist
Heaven‡: Released: October 1993; Label: Spectrum/Karussell • London; Format: CD • MC	—	—	—	—	—	—	—	—	—	—		
Het Beste Van‡ (Note: Limited ten track release, featuring also four songs by Bronski Beat and three others by Somerville. Distributed solely through the newspapers HLN, it was hence ineligible to chart either in Belgium.): Released: 24 February 2005(BEL only); Label: WMB; Format: CD	—	—	—	—	—	—	—	—	—	—		
The Platinum Collection‡ (Note: The Platinum Collection charted in Ireland, peaking in September 2006 at number 53.): Released: 21 March 2006; Label: Rhino • WSM (AUS); Format: CD	—	—	—	—	—	—	—	—	—	—		
The Collection‡: Released: 29 October 2012; Label: Rhino; Format: CD	—	—	—	—	—	—	—	—	—	—		
As lead artist
The Singles Collection 1984/1990†‡: Released: 12 November 1990; Label: London • Mercury (US); Format: LP • CD • MC	—	114	4	4	12	6	30	4	4	—	FRA: Platinum; GER: Gold; NLD: Gold; SWI: Platinum	FRA: 371,700; GER: 250,000; NLD: 50,000; SWI: 50,000
Master Series: Released: 1 August 1996; Label: London; Format: CD	—	—	—	—	—	—	—	—	—	—		
The Very Best Of†‡: Released: 3 September 2001; Label: WSM • London; Format: CD	26	—	15 (Note: The chart entry from March 2006. The source does not specify though, whether the French peak position relates to the standard or the double disc edition, released in October 2002.)	49	(Note: The album would make an entry in Italy in April 2022, after the Collector's Edition of The Very Best Of set reached number 40 on the local iTunes Albums Chart. (The enhanced version would also chart on other equivalents of the digital chart, such as in the UK, Germany and France; none of these however with more significant performance than upon the album's original release. The exceptions were Brazilian and Spanish iTunes charts, where the special version scored at numbers 17 and 43, respectively.))	—	—	—	29	—	UK: Gold	FRA: 17,800; UK: 100,000
The Essentials†: Released: 2 April 2002(US only); Label: London; Format: CD	—	—	—	—	—	—	—	—	—	(Note: The Essentials was designed for North America, becoming ineligible to chart elsewhere. The compilation did not chart in the States either.)		
For a Friend: The Best Of†‡: Released: 15 June 2009; Label: MCD; Format: 2×CD	—	—	—	—	—	—	—	—	(Note: For a Friend: The Best Of did not enter the official UK Top 100 Albums Chart, reaching only at number 160 in January 2012, but one week later it peaked at number 14 on the UK component Indie Chart.)	—		
Dance & Desire: Rarities & Videos†‡: Released: 17 November 2014; Label: Rhino • Edsel; Format: 2×CD+DVD (mediabook)	—	—	—	—	—	—	—	—	(Note: Dance & Desire: Rarities & Videos entered only the UK Top 50 Independent Albums Chart, debuting at number 32 upon its release.)	—		
Keys: † as, with or featuring Bronski Beat • ‡ as, with or featuring The Communards "—" denotes releases that did not chart or were not released in the region

== Extended plays ==
Title details	Notes
As featured artist
Lovers Unlimited (with John Winfield): Released: 12 February 2016 (download); Label: Membran; Format: download • CD	Five track EP featuring songs co-produced and written by Somerville and John Winfield for various artists, with both being also credited as presenters of the release. Apart from three songs ("As Long as I Breathe", "Give Me Your Hand to Hold" and "Somebody's Lover Now"), one was co-written also with Caroline Buckley ("Don't Hold Back") and the other with Sidney Bishop ("Head over Heels").
As lead artist
Bright Thing: Released: 20 October 2010 (BX); Label: S/P; Format: download • CD	Four-track EP featuring "Overload", "Bright Thing", "Hearts" and "Freak", was released in advance only in Benelux as download; since 12 December 2010 distributed also on CD elsewhere. In 2011, two remixed equivalents followed, both digital—the Deluxe Edition was enhanced with four additional, mostly radio mixes, the other subtitled Remixes, with strictly those extended.
Momentum: Released: 24 June 2011; Label: S/P; Format: CD • download	Seven-track EP featuring "Mountains", "Make Way Jerusalem", "The Core", "Was like a Thunder" and "Amen", as well two additional remixes.
Solent: Released: 28 May 2012; Label: S/P; Format: download • CD	Eight-track EP featuring "Some Wonder", "Kite (Siriusmo Remix)", "Taken Away", "Reconciliation" and "Why Did It End This Way?", as well three additional remixes. Originally as download, since 3 October 2012 distributed also on CD.

== Singles ==
Title	Year	Peak chart positions										Certifications	Album
Title	Year	SCO	AUS	FRA	GER	ITA	NLD	NZD	SWI	UK	US Dance (Note: Only four singles made it into the US Hot 100: "Smalltown Boy" (#48 in March 1985), "Don't Leave Me This Way" (#40 in March 1987), "Never Can Say Goodbye" (#51 in February 1988) and "You Make Me Feel (Mighty Real) (#87 in April 1990). For that reason, the component dance chart has been supplied instead as the one with the most frequent entries for his records in the States.)	Certifications	Album
As featured artist
"Smalltown Boy"† (Note: "Smalltown Boy" was reissued on several separate occasions—with the first becoming a 1991 remix, credited primarily to Somerville instead. The Bronski Beat own remixed versions would follow every ten years—in 1994, 2004 and in 2013,—while the singer's brand new studio recording of the work was made in 2014, along with a promotional video.)	1984	—	8	8	3	1	1	5	2	3	1	CAN: Gold; ITA: Gold (Note: Claimed for digital sale.); UK: Platinum	The Age of Consent
"Why?"† (Note: Initially, the single was re-released in England in 2000 with Somerville as the lead artist. In 2006, the composition was reproduced under name "Tell Me Why" by Swedish DJ duo Supermode, who would interpolate its lyrics into the music sampled from the singer's signature song ("Smalltown Boy"). Apart from that, "Why" was also reworked as "You & Me" in 2007 by Scottish Blue Ray, this time containing samples of a Yazoo's song ("Situation") and with Somerville featured as a guest.)	1984	—	10	8	5	5	6	11	7	6	27	UK: Silver	The Age of Consent
"Ain't Necessarily So"†	1984	—	58	—	31	—	21	27	—	16	—		The Age of Consent
"I Feel Love Medley"† (with Marc Almond)	1985	—	34	28	16	—	11	—	23	3	(Note: "I Feel Love Medley" and "Disenchanted" charted in the US only on the Hot Dance Music/Maxi-Singles Sales, peaking at number 50 and number 43, respectively.)	UK: Silver	Hundreds & Thousands
"You Are My World"‡ (Note: "You Are My World" was commercially promoted twice. The original 1985 release charted only in Ireland, England, Italy, the Eurochart and France. The 1987 reissue would make additional re-entries in the UK, Ireland, as well the European chart, while for the first time in Flemish Belgium, the Netherlands and Germany. In order to avoid multiple records, the listed peak positions include both official releases, regardless of the different years.)	1985	—	—	16	59	22	23	—	—	21	—	FRA: Silver	Communards
"Suspicious Minds" (with FYC)	1985	—	6	—	37	—	21	14	—	8	23		Fine Young Cannibals
"Disenchanted"‡	1986	—	—	—	—	—	47	—	—	29			Communards
"Don't Leave Me This Way"‡ (featuring Sarah Jane Morris) (Note: On some editions, the "Don't Leave Me This Way" single was credited to The Communards only.)	1986	—	2	6	5	3	1	2	2	1	1	FRA: Silver; NLD: Platinum; UK: Gold	Communards
"So Cold the Night"‡	1986	—	90	17	14	—	8	44	10	8 (Note: "So Cold the Night" was simultaneously released as a double A-side single in the UK, altogether with "The Multimix".)	25		Communards
"The Multimix"‡	1987	—	—	—	—	—	—	—	—	8	—	SPA: Gold	non-album single
"Tomorrow"‡	1987	—	99	32	25	14	31	—	23	23	—		Red
"Never Can Say Goodbye"‡	1987	—	13	9	6	—	3	6	12	4	2	FRA: Silver; UK: Silver	Red
"Hold On Tight"‡ (Note: "Hold on Tight" single was released strictly on 7" vinyl in Philippines, and therefore was not eligible to potentially chart also in other countries.)	1987	—	—	—	—	—	—	—	—	—	—		Red
"For a Friend"‡	1988	—	—	—	35	—	—	—	—	28	—		Red
"There's More to Love"‡	1988	—	—	—	34	—	—	—	—	20	—		Red
"Do They Know It's Christmas?" (Note: A reissue of "Do They Know It's Christmas?" re-charted in the UK at number 82 in December 2007, side by side the original version of the song as a double A-side single) (as Band Aid II)	1989	—	30	—	74	16	20	8	24	1	—	UK: Platinum	non-album single(s)
"Respect" (as United Against Racism)	1996	—	—	—	—	—	—	—	—	—	—		non-album single(s)
"Star" (with The Weather Girls)	1996	—	—	—	—	—	—	—	—	—	—		Think Big!
"The No.1 Song in Heaven" (with Sparks)	1997	54	—	—	—	—	—	—	—	70	28		Plagiarism
"Fruit" (with Oliver Sim)	2022	—	—	—	—	—	—	—	—	—	(Note: Due to the COVID-19 pandemic, Billboard suspended the chart and has not restored it since. Any singles released after 28 March 2020 were therefore ineligible to appear on the US Dance chart.)		Hideous Bastard
"Hideous" (with Oliver Sim)	2022	—	—	—	—	—	—	—	—	—	(Note: Due to the COVID-19 pandemic, Billboard suspended the chart and has not restored it since. Any singles released after 28 March 2020 were therefore ineligible to appear on the US Dance chart.)		Hideous Bastard
As lead artist
"The Last Infanta" (with Uno)	1988	—	—	—	—	—	—	—	—	—	—		Uno
"Comment te dire adieu" (featuring June Miles Kingston)	1989	—	(Note: Singles "Comment te dire adieu" (#122), "To Love Somebody (#146) and EP Gimme Shelter (#214), all did stall out of the Top 100 Singles chart in Australia.)	3	25	—	26	—	—	14	—	FRA: Silver	Read My Lips
"You Make Me Feel (Mighty Real)"	1990	—	76	7	22	—	49	—	—	5	34		Read My Lips
"Read My Lips (Enough Is Enough)"	1990	—	—	29	57	—	—	—	—	26	—		Read My Lips
"To Love Somebody"	1990	—		15	20	12	4	5	11	8	—		The Singles Collection 1984/1990
"Run from Love" (Note: "Run from Love" was first released in September 1985 as a promotional single, in support of the Bronski Beat's conceptual album Hundreds & Thousands. Upon its 1990 official release for The Singles Collection 1984/1990, the composition has been since credited to Somerville.)	1991	—	—	27	98	—	—	—	—	52	—		The Singles Collection 1984/1990
"Gimme Shelter" (Note: EP Gimme Shelter charted on the singles charts as a collective work of various artists to support the Shelter's 'Putting Our House in Order' charity project. Each of involved though, recorded their own cover of the Rolling Stone's song as a duet with another act, depending on a format—pop, rock, dance or alternative. Somerville's pop remake with Voice of the Beehive was also promoted with a music video.) (with VOTB)	1993	—		—	—	—	—	—	—	23	—		Gimme Shelter (VA)
"Heartbeat"	1995	15	—	—	54	21	—	—	—	24	1		Dare to Love
"Hurt So Good"	1995	9	—	—	69	—	—	—	—	15	—		Dare to Love
"By Your Side"	1995	42	—	—	—	—	—	—	—	41	—		Dare to Love
"Safe" (Note: Originally known under name "Safe in These Arms", it topped the Spanish chart.)	1997	—	—	—	—	—	—	—	—	—	39		Dare to Love
"Dark Sky" (Note: In July 1997, "Dark Sky" entered the UK Music Week Club Chart at number 43; its peak.)	1997	62	62	—	—	—	—	—	—	66	—		Manage the Damage
"Lay Down"	1999	—	—	—	—	—	—	—	—	(Note: "Lay Down" (#116) did not enter the official UK Top 100 Singles Chart, however in May 1999, it debuted on the UK Club Chart Top 40 at number 32, as well on the component Pop Top 20 as number 8. The following month, it also entered the UK Indie Chart at number 23.)	—		Manage the Damage
"Something to Live For"	1999	—	—	—	100	—	—	—	—	—	—		Manage the Damage
"Can't Take My Eyes Off of You"	2000	—	—	46	—	—	—	—	—	(Note: "Can't Take My Eyes Off of You" was released as a dual single in England, side by side with a remixed reissue of "Why?". Nevertheless, it did not make it into the local Top 100 Singles Chart (stalling in September 2000 at #117).)	—		Queer as Folk 2 (OST)
"It's So Good" (also as Jimmy S)	2004	—	—	—	—	—	—	—	—	—	—		Home Again
"Come On"	2004	—	—	—	—	—	—	—	—	—	—		Home Again
"Ain't No Mountain High Enough"	2005	—	—	—	88	—	—	—	—	—	—		Home Again
Keys: † as Bronski Beat • ‡ as The Communards "—" denotes releases that did not chart or were not released in the region

=== Download singles ===
Title	Year	Notes	Album
As featured artist
"I Believe in Love" (with Arthur Baker)	2011	Two-track remixed release. (LP version was also issued as the B-side on Baker's promo single "Mythical Girl" from 1989.)	Merge
"Summer Love" (by David Latour and Kato)	2014	Two-track single, co-written with David van Hoorebeeke. Issued through the discontinued Belgian label La Musique du Beau Monde. (In November 2014, it peaked on the Ultratop Bubbling Under chart at number 27, as well at number 45 on the Dance.)	non-album single(s)
"I Wish You Well" (with The Big Band Collective also featuring Rick Astley)	2020	Common duet with Astley recorded as their cover version of the Bill Withers song from 1975.	non-album single(s)
"A Million Dreams" (with Ravi Adelekan and friends)	2022	Charity record, featuring contributions by various artists.	non-album single(s)
As lead artist
"Overload"	2010	One-track radio release, designed for Benelux only. (In 2015, a two track extended re-issue followed also elsewhere.)	Bright Thing (Deluxe) (EP)
"The Core"/"Mountains"	2011	Dual single, also known as "Momentum Remixes".	Momentum (EP)
"Take Me There" (with Scratch Massive)	2012	Six-track French single, issued in support of the band's album from 2011. (On the 2022 reissue of the set, a remix by Âme was also included.)	Nuit de rêve
"Set Alight"	2014	Two-track release, also featuring a remix by Adrian Feder.	non-album single
"Smalltown Boy (Reprise 2014)"	2014	New, acoustic recording of Somerville's signature song. (In July 2014, it debuted on the Irish Singles Chart at number 51.)	Dance & Desire: Rarities & Videos
"Back to Me"	2014	One-track radio version. (In 2016 re-issued with a "Stella Polaris Remix".)	Homage
"Travesty"	2014	Issued as a one-track remix, or two-track release with album version.	Homage
"Learned to Talk"	2015	Two-track release, featuring "Taken Away" as B-side.	Homage
"Some Wonder"	2015	One-track 7" version release.	Homage
"Lights Are Shining"	2015	One-track 7" version release.	Homage
"Strong Enough"	2015	Seven-track release, featuring also a remix of "Back to Me" as B-side.	Homage
"Don't Leave Me This Way" (live)	2016	Two-track live release, featuring a 12" remix of "Back to Me" as B-side.	Live and Acoustic at Stella Polaris
"Everything Must Change" (with Sally Herbert)	2021	Charity song, recorded in collaboration with Herbert, in aid of the End Youth Homelessness organisation.	non-album single

=== Promotional singles ===
Title	Year	Notes	Album
As featured artist
"Communards Live"‡	1987	Three-track cassette-only with live recordings of "Reprise", "When the Walls Come Tumbling Down and "Czardas", issued as bonus part of the UK limited 7" single of "You Are My World".	non-album single
"Why Aren't You in Love with Me?" (with Banderas)	1991	One-track US single, issued in support of the band's album from the same year with Somerville and Stevie Lange credited as backing vocalists.	Ripe
As lead artist
"Coming"	1993	Four-track US maxi-single, issued as the theme song of a Sally Potter movie.	Orlando (OST)
"Root Beer"	2000	Three-track US sampler featuring "Tear Full (Radio Version)" as the lead composition, as well two edited remixes of "Something to Live For" and "Safe".	Root Beer
Keys: ‡ as The Communards

=== Other songs ===
Title	Year	Notes	Album
As featured artist
"Infatuation/Memories"†	1984	Both joined tracks appear as B-side of the "Smalltown Boy" single.	Hundreds & Thousands
"Cadillac Car"†	1984	Appears as B-side of the "Why?" single.	Hundreds & Thousands
"Close to the Edge"†	1984	Both tracks appear as B-side of the "Ain't Necessarily So" single. ("Close to the Edge" was also included on the reissue of The Age of Consent.)	Hundreds & Thousands
"Red Dance"†	1984	Both tracks appear as B-side of the "Ain't Necessarily So" single. ("Close to the Edge" was also included on the reissue of The Age of Consent.)	The Age of Consent (reissue)
"Crazy Maraquitta"†	?	Originally unpublished demo recordings from early years, released on the 2018 reissue of the band's debut album, along with other rare or previously unreleased versions of their songs.	The Age of Consent (reissue)
"Up and Down" (instrumental)†	?	Originally unpublished demo recordings from early years, released on the 2018 reissue of the band's debut album, along with other rare or previously unreleased versions of their songs.	The Age of Consent (reissue)
"Ultra Clone" (instrumental)†	?	Originally unpublished demo recordings from early years, released on the 2018 reissue of the band's debut album, along with other rare or previously unreleased versions of their songs.	The Age of Consent (reissue)
"The Other Side of the Tracks"†	?	Originally unpublished demo recordings from early years, released on the 2018 reissue of the band's debut album, along with other rare or previously unreleased versions of their songs.	The Age of Consent (reissue)
"The Potatoe Fields"†	1985	All tracks appear as alternative B-sides of the "I Feel Love Medley" single, depending on edition.	The Age of Consent (reissue)
"Puit d'Amour"†	1985	All tracks appear as alternative B-sides of the "I Feel Love Medley" single, depending on edition.	The Age of Consent (reissue)
"Signs (and Wonders)"†	1985	All tracks appear as alternative B-sides of the "I Feel Love Medley" single, depending on edition.	The Age of Consent (reissue)
"Hard Rain"†	1985	First promoted on the UK 7" EP NME Readers' Poll Winners '84, distributed in the magazine's issue from 25 May 1985, later a regular B-side of the promotional single "Run from Love".	Hundreds & Thousands
"Breadline Britain"‡	1985	Both tracks appear as B-side of the "You Are My World" single. (The first was also showcased on a UK 7" untitled four-track EP, distributed as a free record in the October '85's issue of Tony Fletcher's magazine Jamming!)	Communards (reissue)
"Sentimental Journey"‡	1985	Both tracks appear as B-side of the "You Are My World" single. (The first was also showcased on a UK 7" untitled four-track EP, distributed as a free record in the October '85's issue of Tony Fletcher's magazine Jamming!)	Communards (reissue)
"On a Promise" (with FYC)	1985	Another track recorded for the band's debut album as a backing vocalist.	Fine Young Cannibals
"Annie" (instrumental)‡	1986	Both tracks appear as B-side of the "Disenchanted" single. (Only co-writing credit on the instrumental track.)	Communards (reissue)
"Johnny Verso"‡	1986	Both tracks appear as B-side of the "Disenchanted" single. (Only co-writing credit on the instrumental track.)	Communards (reissue)
"Sanctified"‡	1986	Appears as B-side on the "Don't Leave Me This Way" single.	Communards (reissue)
"When the Walls Come Tumbling Down"‡	1986	Appear as B-side on the "So Cold the Night" single. ("When the Walls Come Tumbling Down" was dedicated to Nelson Mandela.)	Communards (reissue)
"Never No More"‡	1986	Appear as B-side on the "So Cold the Night" single. ("When the Walls Come Tumbling Down" was dedicated to Nelson Mandela.)	Communards (reissue)
"Judgement Day"‡	1987	All songs appear as alternative B-sides on 1987 reissues of the "You Are My World" single, depending on edition. (The live track recorded at the Apollo Theatre, Oxford, UK by the BBC Transcription Services.)	Communards (reissue)
"The Message"‡	1987	All songs appear as alternative B-sides on 1987 reissues of the "You Are My World" single, depending on edition. (The live track recorded at the Apollo Theatre, Oxford, UK by the BBC Transcription Services.)	Communards (reissue)
"Czardas" (live; instrumental)‡	1987	All songs appear as alternative B-sides on 1987 reissues of the "You Are My World" single, depending on edition. (The live track recorded at the Apollo Theatre, Oxford, UK by the BBC Transcription Services.)	Heaven
"That Perfect Medley"†	1987	Medley composed of "Smalltown Boy", "Run from Love", "Hit That Perfect Beat", "Why?" and "I Feel Love", issued on the US double vinyl compilation.	Razormaid (VA)
"I Just Want to Let You Know"‡	1987	Both tracks appear as B-side on the "Tomorrow" single. ("Romanze for Violin, Piano & Hedgehog" was written and performed solely by Coles.)	Red (reissue)
"Scat"‡	1987	Both tracks appear as B-side on the "Tomorrow" single. ("Romanze for Violin, Piano & Hedgehog" was written and performed solely by Coles.)	Red (reissue)
"'77 The Great Escape"‡	1987	Issued on B-side of the "Never Can Say Goodbye" single. (Instrumental "Piece of Saxophone", was performed solely by Coles.)	Red (reissue)
"I Do It All for You"‡	1987	Issued on B-side of the "Never Can Say Goodbye" single. (Instrumental "Piece of Saxophone", was performed solely by Coles.)	Red (reissue)
"C Minor" (live)‡	1987	Appears on the London Recordings compilation, excluding its Canadian edition. (In 2022 included on the double disc reissue of Red.)	Giant (VA)
"Megamix"‡	1988	A megamix compiled of the band's first six singles—excluding "Tomorrow"—and "Heaven Above". It appears as the B-side on the UK promotional 12" single "For a Friend".	Dance & Desire: Rarities & Videos
"Zing Went the Strings of My Heart"‡	1988	All tracks appear as B-sides of the "There's More to Love" single. (Only co-writing credit on the Spanish track, subtitled "El amor no es solo un hombre y una mujer".)	Red (reissue)
"Spanish Rap"‡	1988	All tracks appear as B-sides of the "There's More to Love" single. (Only co-writing credit on the Spanish track, subtitled "El amor no es solo un hombre y una mujer".)	Red (reissue)
"When the Boy in Your Heart Is the Boy in Your Arms"‡	1988	All tracks appear as B-sides of the "There's More to Love" single. (Only co-writing credit on the Spanish track, subtitled "El amor no es solo un hombre y una mujer".)	Red (reissue)
"One Fine Day" (with Carmel)	1989	Song dedicated to Harvey Milk, released on the band's album.	Set Me Free
"Words (J+S Mix)" (by Low)	1998	Track co-mixed by Somerville along with Sally Herbert for the US band.	owL Remix
"I Was Born This Way" (with Craig C.)	2006	Appears on the US soundtrack. (The duet was also included on compilation Gay Games VII, in support of the LGBT event known as Gay Olympics.)	Another Gay Movie (OST)
As lead artist
"Hey Stranger!"	1985	Co-written with Philippe Sarde for French drama Harlem. (Renamed as "Stranger" in 1990, and issued as B-side of the "Read My Lips" single.)	Read My Lips (reissue)
"Grey Skies Turning Blue"	1987	Written and recorded for Ron Peck's movie Empire State.	non-album song
"Tell the World"	1989	Appears as B-side of the "Comment te dire adieu" single.	Read My Lips (reissue)
"Until I Get Over You"	1989	Originally unpublished demo recordings, released on the 2023 double-disc reissue of Somerville's solo debut set.	Read My Lips (reissue)
"I Won't Let You See Me"	1989	Originally unpublished demo recordings, released on the 2023 double-disc reissue of Somerville's solo debut set.	Read My Lips (reissue)
"Not So God Almighty"	1990	Appears as B-side of the "You Make Me Feel (Mighty Real)" single.	Read My Lips (reissue)
"From This Moment On"	1990	Cover of Cole Porter's song, recorded for the first RHO compilation.	Red Hot + Blue
"Desire"	1991	B-side of the "Run from Love" 7-inch/CD single.	Read My Lips (reissue)
"Eliza"	1992	Additional track recorded for Potter's movie, also known as "Eliza Is the Fairest Queen".	Orlando (OST)
"The Attendant"	1993	Sheet music co-written with Gary Butcher and sung for Isaac Julien's short film of the same name.	non-album song
"So Long Babe"	1995	Both tracks appear on the US soundtrack of Steve McLean's independent film as the theme music.	Postcards from America (OST)
"Postcards from America Suite"	1995	Both tracks appear on the US soundtrack of Steve McLean's independent film as the theme music.	Postcards from America (OST)
"Up and Away"	1995	Appears as B-side of the "Heartbeat" single.	Dare to Love (reissue)
"Love You Forever"	1995	Both tracks appear as B-side of the "Hurt So Good" single.	Dare to Love (reissue)
"Been So Long"	1995	Both tracks appear as B-side of the "Hurt So Good" single.	Dare to Love (reissue)
"Nothing Said, Nothing Done"	1995	Appears as B-side of the "By Your Side" single.	Dare to Love (reissue)
"Tear Fool"	1997	Both tracks appear as B-side of the "Dark Sky" single. (Initially, both songs were issued on the US remix set Root Beer.)	Manage the Damage (reissue)
"Blame"	1997	Both tracks appear as B-side of the "Dark Sky" single. (Initially, both songs were issued on the US remix set Root Beer.)	Manage the Damage (reissue)
"I Believe"	1999	Both tracks appear as B-side of the UK "Lay Down" single. (Initially, both songs were issued on the US remix set Root Beer.)	Manage the Damage (reissue)
"Moving On"	1999	Both tracks appear as B-side of the UK "Lay Down" single. (Initially, both songs were issued on the US remix set Root Beer.)	Manage the Damage (reissue)
"Child"	2004	Bonus track from the download version of Home Again.	Home Again (reissue)
"I Will" (with Mystéfy)	2008	Appears as the closing duet on the German jazz singer's debut album.	Spark Within
"World of My Own"	2009	The theme song, recorded for Jean-Claude Schlim's House of Boys.	Home Again (reissue)
"Parvana (Beautiful Butterfly)"	2011	Unreleased track, allegedly dedicated to Neda Agha-Soltan.	non-album song
"What Makes Us Wonderful" (with Salvatore Ganacci)	2022	Appears on the DJ's download set from the same year.	Culturally Appropriate
Keys: † as Bronski Beat • ‡ as The Communards

== Videos ==
=== Video albums/EPs ===
Title details	Notes
As featured artist
The First Chapter†: Released: May 1985; Label: Channel 5 • PolyGram; Format: VHS • LD (JAP)	Video EP equivalent of the Bronski Beat debut album, featuring all four singles taken from The Age of Consent: "Smalltown Boy", "Why?", "Ain't Necessarily So" and "I Feel Love Medley". (In June 1985, it debuted on the UK Top 30 Music Video at number 3; its peak.)
The Video Singles‡: Released: November 1986; Label: Channel 5 • PolyGram; Format: VHS	Video EP equivalent of the Communards' eponymous album, featuring all four promoted singles: "You Are My World" (original version), "Disenchanted", "Don't Leave Me This Way" and "So Cold the Night". (In January 1987, it entered the UK Top 30 Music Video at number 18; its peak.)
Stand By Me‡: Released: 16 June 1988; Label: Channel 5 • PolyGram • IVE (US); Format: VHS • LD (JAP)	The AIDS Day Benefit Concert, recorded live on 1 April 1987 at Wembley Arena, London, England. Apart from the opening "Stand by Me", sung with others, Somerville himself performed "Don't Leave Me This Way" and a cover of Patsy Cline's "Never No More". The American and Japanese editions—both distributed through RVV as well—these featured a slightly different playlist.
Live at Full House‡: Released: 1989 (JAP); Label: M's Box; Format: LD (JAP)	Ten-track Japanese video album, recorded live on 2 October 1986 at Capitol in Hanover, Germany for the local TV show Full House Rock Show. (In May 2006 re-released in Europe on PAL-encoded DVD by ARD Video as Live at Full House Rock Show, also featuring additional material.)
As lead artist
The Video Collection 1984/1990†‡: Released: November 1990; Label: London • PolyGram (US); Format: VHS • LD (JAP)	Seventeen-track video release, featuring all music videos made with his former groups, as well as solo (except for "Run from Love"). In addition, a rendition of ABBA's "Dancing Queen", performed for the TV show Friday Night Live in March 1988, is also present. (In December 1990, the album debuted on the UK Top 30 Music Video at number 17; its peak.)
Keys: † as, with or featuring Bronski Beat • ‡ as, with or featuring The Communards

=== Music videos ===
Title	Year	Notes	Album
As featured artist
"Smalltown Boy"†	1984	First aired in June 1984, directed by Bernard Rose.	The First Chapter
"Why?"†	1984	First aired in September 1984, also directed by Rose.	The First Chapter
"Ain't Necessarily So"†	1984	First aired in December 1984, directed by Simon Milne.	The First Chapter
"I Feel Love Medley"†	1985	First aired in April 1985, directed by Connie Giannaris.	The First Chapter
"You Are My World"‡	1985	First aired in October 1985, also directed by Giannaris, along with Steven Lavers. Made in three versions – two in 1985, one in 1987.	The Video Singles
"Suspicious Minds"	1985	First aired in January 1986, directed by Gerard de Thame. Issued on the PAL-encoded CD Video of the same name. (Only vocal credit.)	The Raw & the Cooked
"Disenchanted"‡	1986	First aired in May 1986, also co-directed by Giannaris/Lavers.	The Video Singles
"Don't Leave Me This Way"‡	1986	First aired in August 1986, directed by Duncan Gibbins. Made in two versions – original and extended. Issued on CD Video.	The Video Singles
"So Cold the Night"‡	1986	First aired in November 1986, directed by Andy Morahan.	The Video Singles
"Tomorrow"‡	1987	First aired in September 1987, directed by Peter Christopherson.	The Video Collection 1984/1990
"Never Can Say Goodbye"‡	1987	First aired in November 1987, also directed by Morahan.	The Video Collection 1984/1990
"For a Friend"‡	1988	First aired in February 1988, also directed by Morahan.	The Video Collection 1984/1990
"There's More to Love"‡	1988	First aired in June 1988, directed by The Molotov Brothers. (Note: A production company, formed in 1986 by Kevin Moloney and Steve Lowe. a video company consisting of Martin and Steven Brierley, Steve Lowe, lames Fletcher and Liam Kan.)	The Video Collection 1984/1990
"Do They Know It's Christmas?"	1989	First aired in December 1989, directed by Kevin Godley.	non-album video(s)
"I Wish You Well"	2020	First aired online in July 2020, made by Leo Mansell.	non-album video(s)
"Fruit"	2022	First aired online in April 2022, directed by Yann Gonzalez. (Only vocal credit.)	non-album video(s)
"Hideous"	2022	First aired online in May 2022, also directed by Gonzalez.	non-album video(s)
"A Million Dreams"	2022	First aired online in November 2022, directed by Aiyana Gane.	non-album video(s)
As lead artist
"The Last Infanta"	1988	Released in November 1988, co-directed by Ray Oxley and Steve McLean. Issued on the PAL-encoded CD Video of the same name.	non-album video
"Comment te dire adieu?"	1989	First aired in November 1989, also directed by McLean.	The Video Collection 1984/1990
"You Make Me Feel (Mighty Real)"	1989	First aired in January 1990, also directed by McLean.	The Video Collection 1984/1990
"Read My Lips (Enough Is Enough)"	1990	First aired in March 1990, also directed by McLean.	The Video Collection 1984/1990
"To Love Somebody"	1990	First aired in November 1990, also directed by McLean.	The Video Collection 1984/1990
"From This Moment On"	1990	First aired in December 1990, also directed by McLean.	Red Hot + Blue (VA)
"Run from Love"	1991	First aired in August 1991, also directed by McLean. Made in two versions – original and extended.	Dance & Desire: Rarities & Videos
"Gimme Shelter"	1993	First aired in 1993, directed by Willy Smax. Made in two versions – original and "Cosmic Cut".	Gimme Shelter: The Video (VA)
"Heartbeat"	1994	First aired in January 1995, directed by Marcus Nispel.	Dance & Desire: Rarities & Videos
"Hurt So Good"	1995	Released in May 1995, directed by Russell Young. Made in two versions – EU / US.	Dance & Desire: Rarities & Videos
"Safe"	1997	Released in 1997 by Jess-E Musique Ltd.; director unknown.	Dance & Desire: Rarities & Videos
"Dark Sky"	1997	Released in 1997; director unknown.	non-album video(s)
"Lay Down"	1999	First aired in 1999, directed by Alex Estrella.	non-album video(s)
"Something to Live For"	1999	Released in 1999, directed by Torben Ferkau.	non-album video(s)
"Here I Am"	1999	Released in 1999, directed by Bart Fisher. (In 2004 presented as the Fisher's USC thesis.)	non-album video(s)
"People Are Strange"	2009	First aired online in April 2009, co-filmed by Andrew Worboys and Mark Trevorrow.	Suddenly Last Summer (Collector's Edition)
"Where Have All the Flowers Gone?"	2009	First aired online in April 2009, also directed by Fisher.	Suddenly Last Summer (Collector's Edition)
"Take Me There"	2011	First aired online in December 2011, directed by Ramon Ayala. (Only vocal credit.)	non-album video
"Smalltown Boy (Reprise 2014)"	2014	First aired online in June 2014, directed by Freddie Hall.	Dance & Desire: Rarities & Videos
"Some Wonder	2015	First aired online in March 2015, directed by Emanuel Fränzel.	non-album video(s)
"Everything Must Change"	2021	First aired online in February 2021, co-directed by Swann/Yoann. (Only footage appearance.)	non-album video(s)
Keys: † as Bronski Beat • ‡ as The Communards
