= Read My Lips =

Read My Lips may refer to:

== Film and television ==
- "Read My Lips" (Batman: The Animated Series), a television episode, 1993
- Read My Lips (film) or Sur mes lèvres, a 2001 French film by Jacques Audiard

== Music ==
=== Albums ===
- Read My Lips (Tim Curry album), 1978
- Read My Lips, by Fee Waybill, 1984
- Read My Lips (Melba Moore album) or the title song, 1985
- Read My Lips (Jimmy Somerville album) or the title song (see below), 1989
- Read My Lips (Sophie Ellis-Bextor album), 2001

=== Songs ===
- "Read My Lips" (Dottie West song), 1983; covered by Marie Osmond, 1986
- "Read My Lips", by Loverboy from Wildside, 1987
- "Read My Lips (Enough Is Enough)", by Jimmy Somerville, 1989
- "Read My Lips", by Duran Duran from Liberty, 1990
- "Read My Lips" (Melissa song), 1991
- "Read My Lips" (Alex Party song), 1996
- "Read My Lips" (Ciara song), 2013
- "Read My Lips", by Inna and Farina, 2020
- "Read My Lips" (Madonna and Feid song), 2026

== See also ==
- "Read my lips: no new taxes", a quote from George H. W. Bush at the 1988 Republican National Convention
- Lip reading
