= Homage (Jimmy Somerville album) =

Studio album by Jimmy Somerville
- Released: 6 March 2015
- Recorded: 2014 (mix)
- Studio: Snap Studios, London; AIR Lyndhurst Hall, London (strings); Faust Am Fleet, Hamburg (mix)
- Genre: Indie dance; indie rock; nu-disco
- Length: 46:49
- Label: Membran; SFE
- Producer: John Winfield; Jimmy Somerville

Jimmy Somerville chronology
Live at Rewind Festival (2014)	Homage (2015)	Live and Acoustic at Stella Polaris (2016)

Singles from Homage
- 1. "Back to Me" Released: 19 September 2014; 2. "Travesty" Released: 28 October 2014; 3. "Learned to Talk" Released: 27 February 2015; 4. "Some Wonder" Released: 6 March 2015; 5. "Lights Are Shining" Released: 15 June 2015; 6. "Strong Enough" Released: 11 September 2015; 7. "Overload" Released: 25 September 2015

Professional ratings
Review scores
Source	Rating
AllMusic	4/5 stars
The Arts Desk	4/5 stars
The Daily Telegraph	4/5 stars
The Scotsman	3/5 stars

Homage is the sixth solo studio album by Scottish singer Jimmy Somerville, released on 6 March 2015. As such, the title is inspired by the genre of disco music that Somerville grew up with, featuring twelve original compositions, mostly co-written with his longtime collaborator John Winfield.

== Track listing ==
Homage – Standard edition (CD • 2×LP • download) / Limited edition (CD+2×LP)
No.	Title	Writer(s)	Producer(s)	Length
1.	"Some Wonder"	Jimmy Somerville; John Winfield	Somerville; Winfield	3:53
2.	"Strong Enough"	Somerville; Winfield	Somerville; Winfield	4:19
3.	"Freak"	Somerville; Winfield	Somerville; Winfield	3:36
4.	"Taken Away"	Somerville; Winfield	Somerville; Winfield	4:39
5.	"Back to Me"	Caroline Buckley; Somerville; Winfield	Somerville; Winfield	4:44
6.	"The Core"	Somerville; Winfield	Somerville; Winfield	3:52
7.	"Travesty"	Somerville; Winfield	Somerville; Winfield	4:24
8.	"Bright Thing"	Somerville; Winfield	Somerville; Winfield	3:54
9.	"Lights Are Shining"	Buckley; Somerville; Winfield	Somerville; Winfield	3:17
10.	"This Hand"	Somerville; Winfield	Somerville; Winfield	3:30
11.	"Overload"	Somerville; Winfield	Somerville; Winfield	4:06
12.	"Learned to Talk"	Buckley; Colin Smith; Somerville; Winfield	Somerville; Winfield	4:35
Total length:				48:49

== Charts ==
Chart (2015)	Peak position
French Albums Chart (SNEP)	60
UK Independent Albums (OCC)	41
US Top Dance/Electronic Albums (Billboard)	25

== 12" of Homage / Club Homage remix albums ==
12" of Homage – Vinyl version, 2015 (2×LP), issued for Record Store Day.
No.	Title	Writer(s)	Producer(s)	Length
1.	"Back to Me (Extended Version)"	Buckley; Somerville; John Winfield	Somerville; Winfield	8:08
2.	"Back to Me (Radio Edit)"	Buckley; Somerville; John Winfield	Somerville; Winfield	3:46
3.	"Travesty (Extended Version)"	Somerville; Winfield	Somerville; Winfield	8:21
4.	"Travesty (Radio Edit)"	Somerville; Winfield	Somerville; Winfield	3:45
5.	"Overload (Extended Version)"	Caroline Buckley; Somerville; Winfield	Somerville; Winfield	7:41
6.	"Overload (Original)"	Somerville; Winfield	Somerville; Winfield	4:06
7.	"Some Wonder (Extended Version)"	Somerville; Winfield	Somerville; Winfield	7:42
8.	"Some Wonder (Original)"	Somerville; Winfield	Somerville; Winfield	3:52
Total length:				47:21

Club Homage – Standard version, 2016 (CD • download)
No.	Title	Writer(s)	Producer(s)	Length
1.	"Travesty (Extended Version)"	Somerville; Winfield	Somerville; Winfield	8:21
2.	"Strong Enough (Tom Moulton Mix)"	Somerville; Winfield	Somerville; Winfield	7:51
3.	"Overload (Felix Gauder Remix)"	Somerville; Winfield	Somerville; Winfield	5:07
4.	"Back to Me (Extended Version)"	Buckley; Somerville; Winfield	Somerville; Winfield	8:04
5.	"Travesty (Robbie Leslie Mix)"	Somerville; Winfield	Somerville; Winfield	11:10
6.	"Strong Enough (Extended Version)"	Somerville; Winfield	Somerville; Winfield	7:25
7.	"Overload (Extended Version)"	Somerville; Winfield	Somerville; Winfield	7:41
8.	"Some Wonder (Extended Version)"	Somerville; Winfield	Somerville; Winfield	7:50
9.	"Lights Are Shining (Radio Remix)"	Buckley; Somerville; Winfield	Somerville; Winfield	3:26
10.	"Strong Enough (John Winfield Remix)"	Somerville; Winfield	Somerville; Winfield	5:16
11.	"Travesty (Sebus & Larzo Remix)"	Somerville; Winfield	Somerville; Winfield	6:38
Total length:				76:49
