= The Very Best Of (Jimmy Somerville album) =

Greatest hits album by Jimmy Somerville featuring Bronski Beat and The Communards
- Released: 10 September 2001
- Recorded: 1984–1995
- Genres: Synth-pop; Hi-NRG; dance
- Length: 74:54
- Label: London
- Producers: Mike Thorne; Stephen Hague; Pascal Gabriel

Jimmy Somerville featuring Bronski Beat and The Communards chronology
| Manage the Damage (1999) | The Very Best Of (2001) | The Essentials (2002) |

Professional ratings
Review scores
| Source | Rating |
|---|---|
| AllMusic | 4/5 stars |

The Very Best Of is a greatest hits album covering Scottish pop singer Jimmy Somerville's career in Bronski Beat, The Communards and as a solo artist. It was released in 2001 and reached number 29 in the UK Albums Chart.

The album features mostly the same tracks, although in a different order, to the 1990 compilation The Singles Collection 1984/1990. Only one track from that album, "Run from Love", isn't featured on The Very Best and is replaced with the newer track "Hurt So Good".

Although Bronski Beat had three UK top 40 hits after Somerville's departure ("Hit That Perfect Beat", "C'mon C'mon" and "Cha Cha Heels") they are not included on the compilation as it is intended as a retrospective of Somerville's career.

In 2002, the compilation was re-released as a limited edition double CD set.

== Track listing ==
| No. | Title | Writer(s) | From album | Length |
|---|---|---|---|---|
| 1. | "Smalltown Boy" (Bronski Beat) | Jimmy Somerville; Larry Steinbachek; Steve Bronski | The Age of Consent | 5:00 |
| 2. | "Don't Leave Me This Way" (The Communards with Sarah Jane Morris) | Kenneth Gamble; Leon Huff; Cary Gilbert | Communards | 4:33 |
| 3. | "Why?" (Bronski Beat) | Somerville; Steinbachek; Bronski | The Age of Consent | 3:58 |
| 4. | "You Make Me Feel (Mighty Real)" (Jimmy Somerville) | Sylvester James; Dip Warrick | Read My Lips | 3:58 |
| 5. | "Disenchanted" (The Communards) | Somerville; Richard Coles | Communards | 4:11 |
| 6. | "Never Can Say Goodbye" (The Communards) | Clifton Davis | Red | 4:28 |
| 7. | "So Cold the Night" (The Communards) | Somerville; Coles | Communards | 4:41 |
| 8. | "To Love Somebody" (Jimmy Somerville) | Barry Gibb; Robin Gibb | The Singles Collection 1984/1990 | 4:17 |
| 9. | "There's More to Love (Than Boy Meets Girl)" (The Communards) | Somerville; Coles | Red | 3:51 |
| 10. | "Comment te dire adieu" (Jimmy Somerville featuring June Miles-Kingston) | Jack Gold; Arnold Goland; Serge Gainsbourg | Read My Lips | 3:38 |
| 11. | "You Are My World" (The Communards) | Somerville; Coles | Communards | 4:31 |
| 12. | "I Feel Love/Johnny Remember Me" (Bronski Beat with Marc Almond) | Giorgio Moroder; Pete Bellotte; Donna Summer; Geoff Goddard | Hundreds & Thousands | 5:48 |
| 13. | "Tomorrow" (The Communards) | Somerville; Coles | Red | 4:49 |
| 14. | "Hurt So Good" (Jimmy Somerville) | Phillip Mitchell | Dare to Love | 3:52 |
| 15. | "Read My Lips (Enough Is Enough)" (Jimmy Somerville) | Somerville | Read My Lips | 4:49 |
| 16. | "For a Friend" (The Communards) | Somerville; Coles | Red | 4:38 |
| 17. | "It Ain't Necessarily So" (Bronski Beat) | George Gershwin; Ira Gershwin | The Age of Consent | 4:06 |

== Charts and certifications ==
=== Weekly charts ===
| Chart (2001–02) | Peak position |
|---|---|
| German Albums Chart | 49 |
| Scottish Albums Chart | 26 |
| UK Albums Chart | 29 |

| Chart (2009) | Peak position |
|---|---|
| UK Budget Albums | 17 |

=== Certifications ===
| Region | Certification | Certified units/sales |
|---|---|---|
| United Kingdom (BPI) | Gold | 100,000^{‡} |
^{‡} Sales+streaming figures based on certification alone.

=== iTunes charts performance ===
In August 2015 the album debuted on the German iTunes chart at number 12, while in August 2017 on the French equivalent it reached number 85.

The Collector's Edition of the set would make entries first in Brazil, reaching number 17 in May 2019, and later in France at number 41 as well at number 43 in Spain, both in May 2020. In the UK, the enhanced version peaked at number 48 in July 2021, in Italy at number 40 in April 2022, and in Germany at number 50 in June 2022.}
