= Ripe (Banderas album) =

Studio album by Banderas
- Released: 1991
- Label: London
- Producer: Stephen Hague; Banderas; Mike Dignam

Ripe is the only studio album by English female pop music duo Banderas, released in 1991. It features the single "This Is Your Life", which reached number 16 in the UK Singles Chart, plus the follow-up single "She Sells", which reached number 41. A third single, "May This Be Your Last Sorrow", failed to chart.

The album includes an appearance from singer Jimmy Somerville, providing backing vocals on the track "Why Aren't You in Love With Me?"; Banderas band members Caroline Buckley and Sally Herbert had been backing musicians with Somerville's band The Communards. Johnny Marr from The Smiths and Bernard Sumner from New Order provide guitar on "This Is Your Life", with Sumner also doing backing vocals.

== Critical reception ==
Professional ratings
Review scores
Source	Rating
AllMusic	3/5 stars

In a retrospective review for AllMusic, William Cooper gave Ripe three out of five stars, describing the album as "addictive ear candy" and that band member Caroline Buckley sings "with confidence and clarity." He described the opening track, "This Is Your Life", as "funky [and] beautifully produced", and "May This Be Your Last Sorrow" as "eerie", though going on to write that the eight remaining tracks "don't quite scale the same heights", yet "Buckley's extraordinary pipes save the material from sinking into mediocrity."

== Track listing ==
All tracks written by Caroline Buckley and Sally Herbert (Banderas), except where noted.

No.	Title	Writer(s)	Length
1.	"This Is Your Life"	Buckley; Herbert; Roger Swallow	4:37
2.	"Comfort of Faith"		4:17
3.	"May This Be Your Last Sorrow"		5:00
4.	"First Hand"	Buckley; Herbert; Stephen Hague	5:00
5.	"Why Aren't You in Love With Me?"		4:50
6.	"She Sells"		4:03
7.	"Too Good"		4:59
8.	"Don't Let That Man"	Buckley; Herbert; Hague; Swallow	4:17
9.	"It's Written All Over My Face"		4:20
10.	"Never Too Late"	Buckley; Herbert; Hague	5:03

== Personnel ==
Adapted from the album's liner notes.

=== Musicians ===
Banderas

- Caroline Buckley – vocals
- Sally Herbert – violin, string arrangement

Additional musicians

- Simon Bishop – drums (tracks 2, 5–8)
- Gary Butcher – guitar (tracks 4–5, 8)
- Simon Elms – trumpet (track 8)
- Luís Jardim – percussion (tracks 3, 7)
- Adrian Lane – trombone (track 8)
- Stevie Lange – backing vocals (tracks 4–6, 8)
- Johnny Marr – guitar (track 1)
- Andy Northfield – keyboards (track 4)
- Dave Pollitt – bass (track 4)
- Keith Michael Osborne – guitar (track 9)
- Jos Pook – viola (track 5)
- Guy Pratt – bass (tracks 2, 5, 7, 8)
- Audrey Riley – cello (track 5)
- Sonia Slany – violin (track 5)
- Jimmy Somerville – backing vocals (track 5)
- Bernard Sumner – guitar, backing vocals (track 1)

=== Production ===
- Sally Herbert – programming
- Chuck Norman – programming (tracks 1–9)
- Produced by Stephen Hague, except track 9 produced by Banderas & Mike Dignam
- All tracks engineered by Tim Weidner, except tracks 1 & 3 by Mike Dignam & Mike "Spike" Drake, track 9 by Mike Dignam
- Additional arrangement on track 3 by Less Stress
- Photography by Chris Nash
- Design by "Two"

== Charts ==
Chart (1991)	Peak position
UK Albums (OCC)	40
