= Manage the Damage =

Studio album by Jimmy Somerville
- Released: 14 June 1999
- Studio: Peg's Study, Mayfair, Battery, Townhouse, RAK, London
- Genre: Synthpop; electronic dance
- Label: Gut
- Producer: Jimmy Somerville; Sally Herbert; Ash Howes

Jimmy Somerville chronology
Dare to Love (1995)	Manage the Damage (1999)	The Very Best Of (2001)

Singles from Manage the Damage
- 1. "Dark Sky" Released: August 1997; 2. "Something to Live For" Released: May 1999; 3. "Lay Down" Released: September 1999

Manage the Damage is the third solo album by pop singer Jimmy Somerville and his first release following his departure from London Records. It was released on 14 June 1999 in the UK and 11 January 2000 in the US.

== Track listing ==
All tracks composed by Jimmy Somerville and Sally Herbert; except where indicated

1. "Here I Am" - 4:15
2. "Lay Down (Contact)" (Sommerville, Herbert, Serge Gainsbourg) - 3:59
3. "Dark Sky" - 3:15
4. "My Life" - 4:32
5. "Something to Live For" (Ed Monaghan) - 3:51
6. "This Must Be Love" - 5:06
7. "Girl Falling Down" - 3:55
8. "Someday Soon" - 3:33
9. "Eve" - 3:51
10. "Stone" - 4:23
11. "Rolling" - 2:59
12. "Something To Live For" (Radio Mix) [UK Bonus Track]

== Personnel ==
- Jimmy Somerville – vocals
- Sally Herbert – programming, string arrangement
- Gary Butcher, Greg Bone – guitar
- Nick Nasmyth – keyboards
- James Sanger – omnichord
- Colin Smith – saxophone
- Simon Elms – flugelhorn
- Adrian Lee – trombone
- Dinah Beamish, Sophie Harris – cello
- Anne Stephenson, Gini Ball, Julia Singleton, Sonia Slany – violin
- Claire Orsler, Jocelyn Pook – viola
- Dee Lewis, Gillian Wisdom, Paul Jason Fredericks, Trevor Conner – backing vocals

== Charts ==
Chart performance for Manage the Damage
Chart (2000)	Peak position
US Top 200 Albums (CMJ New Music Report)	191
