= Home Again (Jimmy Somerville album) =

Studio album by Jimmy Somerville
- Released: 8 November 2004
- Genre: Pop
- Length: 73:27
- Labels: Jinx Musix; BMG
- Producers: Felix Gauder; Milan Sajé; Stefan Fornaro; Tillmann Uhrmacher; Peter Plate; Ulf Leo Sommer; Paul Mac; John Winfield; Andrea Remondini; Mauro Picotto; Jam El Mar; Cet Merlin

Jimmy Somerville chronology
The Essentials (2002)	Home Again (2004)	Het Beste Van The Communards (2005)

Singles from Home Again
- 1. "It's So Good" Released: June 2004; 2. "Come On" Released: October 2004; 3. "Ain't No Mountain High Enough" Released: January 2005

Professional ratings
Review scores
Source	Rating
AllMusic	4.5/5 stars

Home Again is the fourth studio solo album by singer Jimmy Somerville, released in 2004. Somerville's previous solo albums were Read My Lips (1990), Dare to Love (1995) and Manage the Damage (1999). Also released was the US remix EP, Root Beer (2000).

An expanded edition of the album with additional material was released as a 3×CD box set in 2020.

== Singles ==
- "It's So Good"
- "Come On"
- "Ain't No Mountain High Enough"

== Track listing ==
1. "Could It Be Love?" (Felix Gauder, Jimmy Somerville, Milan Sajé) – 3:33
2. "Under a Lover's Sky" (Somerville, Stefan Fornaro, Tillmann Uhrmacher) – 5:12
3. "Come On" (Jimmy Somerville, Peter Plate, Sunniva Greeve, Ulf Leo Sommer) – 3:47
4. "It Still Hurts" (Somerville, Plate, Ulf Leo Sommer) – 3:32
5. "It's So Good" (Somverille, Paul Mac) – 3:46
6. "Burn" (Somerville, Keith Osborne, John Winfield) – 4:04
7. "Ain't No Mountain High Enough" (Nickolas Ashford, Valerie Simpson) – 3:50
8. "I Will Always Be Around" (Gauder, Somerville, Sajé, Sally Herbert) – 3:41
9. "But Not Tonight" (Martin Gore) – 3:19
10. "Amnesia" (Gauder, Somerville) – 3:54
11. "Home Again" (Gauder, Somerville) – 5:12
12. "What's Your Game?" (Somerville, Keith Osborne, John Winfield) – 5:08
13. "Selfish Days" (Somerville, Jam el Mar) – 5:03
14. "Stay" (Somerville, Cet Merlin) – 5:37

German bonus tracks

15. "Sing It to Your Heart" (hidden track after "Stay" and a 7:56 silence)
16. "Ain't No Mountain High Enough" (Björn Wilke's Deep Valley Short Edit)

== Charts ==
Chart performance for Home Again
Chart (2005)	Peak position
German Albums Chart	48
