= Read My Lips (Enough Is Enough) =

Single by Jimmy Somerville

from the album Read My Lips
- Released: 5 March 1990
- Genre: Pop; synth-pop
- Label: London
- Songwriter: Jimmy Somerville
- Producer: Pascal Gabriel

Jimmy Somerville singles chronology
"You Make Me Feel (Mighty Real)" (1990)	"Read My Lips (Enough Is Enough)" (1990)	"To Love Somebody" (1990)

"Read My Lips" is a song written and performed by Scottish singer-songwriter Jimmy Somerville (formerly of the bands Bronski Beat and The Communards) from his 1989 debut solo album Read My Lips. The song discusses the need for increased funding to fight HIV/AIDS.

Released on 5 March 1990 as the third single from Read My Lips, the song didn't chart as well as the previous single, "You Make Me Feel (Mighty Real)", a cover of the Sylvester original, which hit number 5 earlier the same year. However, it did chart inside the Top 40, peaking at number 26 on the UK Singles Chart, and was featured on Now That's What I Call Music! volume 17.

== Critical reception ==
David Giles, reviewer for Music Week magazine, deemed "Read My Lips (Enough Is Enough)" was "a better bet for a single" than "You Make Me Feel (Mighty Real)", adding that the song has "lots of airy keyboard sounds drifting around and generally detracting from the dynamic Hi-NRG pulse of the original", but concluded that he has "still hit material though". Tim Jeffery of Record Mirror stated it has "a subtle melody with right-on lyrics... Quite rousing in an offbeat way, but somehow it just doesn't quite hit the mark".

== Track listing ==
- 12-inch single
1. "Read My Lips (Enough Is Enough)"
2. "Read My Lips (Enough Is Enough)"
3. "Strangers"

== Charts ==
Chart performance for "Read My Lips"
Chart (1990)	Peak position
Belgium (Ultratop 50 Flanders)	38
Europe (Eurochart Hot 100)	64
Europe (European Airplay Top 50)	20
France (SNEP)	29
Ireland (IRMA)	13
UK Dance (Music Week)	31
UK Singles (OCC)	26
West Germany (GfK)	57
