= Banderas (duo) =

British musical duo

- Genres: Pop, dance
- Years active: 1991
- Label: London Records
- Past members: Sally Herbert; Caroline Buckley

Banderas were a British music duo of the early 1990s who were signed to London Records. The band was an offshoot of Jimmy Somerville's band the Communards, and featured two of his female backing musicians, Scottish vocalist Caroline Buckley and English violinist/keyboardist Sally Herbert.

The duo are mostly remembered for their hit single "This Is Your Life", which peaked at No. 16 on the UK Singles Chart in March 1991. The track was co-written with songwriter Roger Swallow and contains samples of the song "Crack Attack" by Grace Jones from her 1989 album Bulletproof Heart. The duo appeared on BBC One's Top of the Pops on 21 March 1991 to perform the song.

The duo's album, Ripe, peaked at No. 40 on the UK Albums Chart, and featured further singles "She Sells" (No. 41) and "May This Be Your Last Sorrow" (which did not chart).

The album features Johnny Marr (the Smiths) on guitar and Bernard Sumner (New Order) on guitar and backing vocals, as well as backing vocals on "Why Aren't You in Love with Me?" by Jimmy Somerville (Bronski Beat/the Communards).

== Post-Banderas careers ==
Sally Herbert became a record producer and in February 2021 teamed up with Somerville to record a cover of "Everything Must Change" by Nina Simone, as a charity record for End Youth Homelessness, a network of projects which includes Centrepoint in London and a number of other homeless charity organisations around the UK.

== Discography ==
=== Albums ===
- Ripe (1991) – UK No. 40

=== Singles ===
Year	Title	Peak positions									Album
Year	Title	UK	AUT	FRA	GER	ITA	NLD	SWE	SWI	US Dance	Album
1991	"This Is Your Life"	16	24	37	22	4	23	30	18	34	Ripe
1991	"She Sells"	41	—	—	—	—	—	—	—	—	Ripe
1991	"May This Be Your Last Sorrow"	78	—	—	—	—	—	—	—	—	Ripe
"—" denotes releases that did not chart or were not released.
