= Read My Lips (Jimmy Somerville album) =

Studio album by Jimmy Somerville
- Released: 27 November 1989
- Studio: Advision
- Genres: Synth-pop; electronic dance
- Label: London
- Producers: Avril Mackintosh; Jess-E; Pascal Gabriel; Stephen Hague

Jimmy Somerville chronology
Read My Lips (1989)	The Singles Collection 1984/1990 (1990)

Singles from Read My Lips
- 1. "Comment te dire adieu" Released: October 1989; 2. "You Make Me Feel (Mighty Real)" Released: January 1990; 3. "Read My Lips (Enough Is Enough)" Released: March 1990

Professional ratings
Review scores
Source	Rating
AllMusic	3/5 stars

Read My Lips is the 1989 debut solo album by Jimmy Somerville, former lead singer of the successful synthpop groups Bronski Beat and The Communards. The album was released through London Records and peaked at number 29 on the UK Albums Chart. It has been certified Gold by the British Phonographic Industry for sales in excess of 100,000 copies.

In July 2012, Read My Lips was released as a two-disc CD set including the original album plus bonus tracks of B-sides and remixes.

On 1 September 2023, Read My Lips was reissued by London Records as a two-disc CD set including the original album plus bonus tracks of B-sides, Demos, New and Original remixes.

The album was produced and engineered by Avril Mackintosh with the exception of Mighty Real (Stephen Hague) and Comment Te Dire Adieu (Pascal Gabriel)

== Track listing ==
=== Original 1989 album ===
LP

All LP tracks by Jimmy Somerville unless otherwise indicated

1. "Comment te dire adieu" featuring June Miles-Kingston (Jack Gold, Arnold Goland, Serge Gainsbourg) – 3:37
2. "You Make Me Feel (Mighty Real)" (Dip Warrick, Sylvester James) – 5:22
3. "Perfect Day" – 4:08
4. "Heaven Here on Earth (With Your Love)" – 5:02
5. "Don't Know What to Do (Without You)" – 6:10
6. "Read My Lips (Enough Is Enough)" – 4:59
7. "My Heart Is in Your Hands" – 4:33
8. "Control" – 4:36
9. "And You Never Thought That This Could Happen to You" – 4:58
10. "Rain" – 5:49

CD

1. "Comment te dire adieu" (featuring June Miles-Kingston) – 3:39
2. "You Make Me Feel (Mighty Real)" – 5:14
3. "Perfect Day" – 4:09
4. "Heaven Here on Earth (With Your Love)" – 5:04
5. "Don't Know What to Do (Without You)" – 6:12
6. "Adieu !" (Madame Tata Mix) – 7:31
7. "Read My Lips (Enough Is Enough)" – 5:00
8. "My Heart Is in Your Hands" – 4:24
9. "Control" – 4:37
10. "And You Never Thought That This Could Happen to You" – 5:00
11. "Rain" – 5:48

=== 2012 2-CD reissue ===
CD 1

1. "Comment te dire adieu" (featuring June Miles-Kingston)
2. "You Make Me Feel (Mighty Real)"
3. "Perfect Day"
4. "Heaven Here on Earth (With Your Love)"
5. "Don't Know What to Do (Without You)"
6. "Comment te dire adieu" (June et Jim présentent Madame Tata Mix)
7. "Read My Lips (Enough Is Enough)"
8. "My Heart Is in Your Hands"
9. "Control"
10. "And You Never Thought This Could Happen to You"
11. "Rain"

Bonus tracks

1. "Run From Love"
2. "To Love Somebody" (The Definitive Mix)
3. "Comment te dire adieu" (Kevin Saunderson Mix; Part 1)
4. "Smalltown Boy" (1991 remix)

CD 2

1. "To Love Somebody" (Dub Mix)
2. "Comment te dire adieu" (Kevin Saunderson Mix; Part 2)
3. "Read My Lips (Enough Is Enough)" (JZJ remix)
4. "Tell the World"
5. "Not So God Almighty"
6. "Rain" (Pascal Gabriel remix)
7. "To Love Somebody" (instrumental)
8. "Run From Love" (extended)
9. "Desire"
10. "Stranger"
11. "Why" (Pascal Gabriel remix) by Bronski Beat
12. "Read My Lips" (JZJ remix dub)
13. "To Love Somebody" (Unplugged live)

=== 2023 2-CD reissue ===
CD 1

1. "Comment te dire adieu"
2. "You Make Me Feel (Mighty Real)"
3. "Perfect Day"
4. "Heaven Here on Earth (With Your Love)"
5. "Don't Know What to Do (Without You)"
6. "Adieu!" (Madame Tata Mix)
7. "Read My Lips" (Enough Is Enough)
8. "My Heart Is in Your Hands"
9. "Control"
10. "And You Never Thought This Could Happen to You"
11. "Rain"

Bonus tracks

1. "Not So God Almighty"
2. "From This Moment On" (from Red Hot + Blue)
3. "I Believe in Love" (from Merge)
4. "Tell the World"
5. "Stranger"

CD 2

1. "Read My Lips (Enough Is Enough)" (Amyl Remix)
2. "You Make Me Feel (Mighty Real)" (Gerd Janson Remix)
3. "Comment te dire adieu" (Commercial Mix)
4. "Rain" (Pascal Gabriel Mix)
5. "You Make Me Feel (Mighty Real)" (Arpeggius Club Vocal)
6. "Run from Love" (featuring Claudia Brücken; 12" remix)
7. "Until I Get Over You" (demo)
8. "I Won't Let You See Me Cry" (demo)
9. "And You Never Thought This Could Happen to You" (demo)
10. "Read My Lips (Enough Is Enough)" (demo)
11. "You Make Me Feel (Mighty Real)" (William Orbit remix)

=== Jimmy Somerville shop bonus CD: "You Make Me Feel (Mighty Real)" ===
1. "You Make Me Feel (Mighty Real)" (Gerd Janson Remix)
2. "Read My Lips (Enough Is Enough)" (AMYL Remix Edit)
3. "Comment Te Dire Adieu" (Kevin Saunderson Remix Part 2)
4. "Read My Lips (Enough Is Enough)" (JZJ Remix)
5. "You Make Me Feel (Mighty Real)" (Arpeggius Remix)
6. "Read My Lips (Enough Is Enough)" (Dub Is Enough)

== Charts ==
Chart performance for Read My Lips
Chart (1989–1990)	Peak position
Australian Albums (ARIA)	114
European Top 100 Albums	35
French Albums Chart	6
Italian Albums Chart (Musica e dischi)	25
UK Albums (Official Charts)	29

2023 chart performance for Read My Lips
Chart (2023)	Peak position
Scottish Albums (Official Charts)	19
UK Independent Albums (Official Charts)	10

Singles

Chart performance for singles from Read My Lips
Year	Single	Chart	Peak position
1989	"Comment te dire adieu" featuring June Miles-Kingston	UK Singles Chart	14
1990	"You Make Me Feel (Mighty Real)"	UK Singles Chart	5
1990	"Read My Lips (Enough Is Enough)"	UK Singles Chart	26

== Certifications ==
Certifications for Read My Lips
Organization	Level	Date
BPI (UK)	Gold	29 November 1989
